= Dusit =

Dusit (ดุสิต) is the Thai name for Tushita, the fourth heavenly realm in Buddhist cosmology. The name may refer to:

- Dusit District, a district of Bangkok
- Dusit Palace, namesake of the district
- Dusit Subdistrict, Bangkok, in Dusit District
- Dusit Subdistrict, Nakhon Si Thammarat, in Tham Phannara District
- Dusit International, a Thai hospitality company
- Suan Dusit University, sometimes shortened as Dusit, formerly known as Suan Dusit Rajabhat University and part of the Rajabhat University system
- Chut Thai Dusit, a dress style of the formal Thai national costume

== See also ==
- Dusit (name)
- Dusit Thani (disambiguation)
