= Dusit Thani (disambiguation) =

Dusit Thani was a miniature city and micronation project created by King Vajiravudh of Siam.

Dusit Thani may also refer to:

- Dusit Thani hotel or Dusit Thani Bangkok, a hotel in Bangkok
- Dusit Thani Public Company Limited, also known as Dusit International, a hospitality company based in Thailand
- Dusit Thani College, a private college in Bangkok, also owned by the company
