= Si Lom (disambiguation) =

Si Lom is the neighbourhood in Bangkok surrounding Si Lom Road.

Si Lom may also refer to:

- Si Lom subdistrict, a subdistrict of Bangkok's Bang Rak district, on the southeast side of Si Lom Road
- Si Lom MRT station, a station of the MRT Blue Line
- Silom Line, a line of the BTS Skytrain
