= Thai National Book Fair =

Book sale event in Thailand

The Thai National Book Fair is the largest book sale event in Thailand, with most participants consisting of writers, book publishers, imprints, and bookstores. It is usually held twice a year, for 11 or 12 days, from late March to early April and from early to mid-October. The event is usually held at the Queen Sirikit National Convention Center and offers free admission.

Nowadays, the event is typically held at the Queen Sirikit National Convention Center and remains free to enter. The MRT has a dedicated station, Queen Sirikit National Convention Center Station, which directly connects to the venue.

== History ==
The origins of Bangkok International Book Week stem from a collaboration between the Department of Academic Affairs, Ministry of Education, and the National Book Development Committee. They designated April 1–7 each year as National Book Week, and the first event was held in 1972.

Later, in 1996, due to rising attendance, the organisers increased the event frequency to twice a year. The first event, called the "National Book Week," was held around March–April, while the second, called the "National Book Fair," was held around October–November. The main difference between the two events was the foreign book zone, which was available only during the first event.

This international aspect was further strengthened in 2003 when the spring event began hosting the Bangkok International Book Fair (BIBF), transforming it into a regional hub for global publishers and copyright exchange.

In 2026, the fair featured more than 2 million books, and approximately 1,200 booths staffed by over 400 publishers. The event attracts a large number of visitors who come to explore the books, join activities, and see exhibitions.

Following record-breaking attendance in the previous year, the Publishers and Booksellers Association of Thailand (PUBAT) expanded the exhibition space from 15,000 to 20,000 square meters. This expansion included increasing the number of halls from three to four to accommodate the growing number of visitors.

== Location ==
In 1972, the Sangeet Sala of the National Theatre, was chosen as the venue for the first book fair. Later, the event moved to various venues, including Lumpini Park, the Chulalongkorn University Auditorium, Horwang School, the Teachers' Council of Thailand, Sanam Luang, and Luk Luang Road next to the Ministry of Education.

Another significant change in the history of the Bangkok International Book Fair occurred in 2001, when the venue moved from the area next to the Teachers’ Council of Thailand auditorium to the Queen Sirikit National Convention Center for the first time. The event attracted 440,000 visitors, an increase of more than 100,000 people compared to the previous venue.

"I admit that sales were very good. All publishers were satisfied. The Queen Sirikit Convention Center is better than the Teachers' Council Center; everything is ready. It should be a good solution for publishers to get cash to produce more books, which will indirectly stimulate the market," Winai Chatianan of Kled Thai Publishing told the media at that time.

Due to the closure of the Queen Sirikit National Conventjkn Center for renovation, the event venue had to be changed, and IMPACT Muang Thong Thani was selected as the next location.

However, because of criticism regarding difficult accessibility, the event was held at Muang Thong Thani only a few times.

In early 2020, due to the COVID-19 outbreak and the need to reduce the risk of transmission, the Bangkok International Book Fair had to be moved to an online format. It later returned to Muang Thong Thani once, then moved to BITEC Bangna once, before returning to an online format at the end of 2021.

On January 13, 2022, the 50th National Book Week and the 20th International Book Week got approved the use of Bang Sue Central Station as a venue by the Committee meeting of the State Railway of Thailand (SRT) period around March 21 to April 8, 2022, a total of 19 days. The organizers then selected the dates for the event to be held between March 26 to April 5, 2022, using a total area of no more than 20,000 square meters.

The event will utilize the entire area of Gate 1, the Red Line train zone, from the front hall including the mezzanine and the interior, totaling approximately an area around 20,000 square meters. Because it was an important national event, aligned with the railway's objectives, and to celebrate the organization's 125th anniversary, approval was given for short-term or temporary use of the space with a rental waiver.

== Poster art ==
Each year, the fair features a different thematic concept and a specially designed poster for each edition, often created by prominent Thai artists and illustrators. (Information of Book fair every 5 years)

=== 'National Book Week,' held around March–April ===
- The 44th National Book Week and the 14th International Book Week

Held from March 29 to April 10, 2016, at the Queen Sirikit National Convention Center.

The theme was "ความหวัง"(Khwam Hwang), meaning "Hope."

- The 49th National Book Week and the 19th International Book Week

Held from April 17 to April 25, 2021, at BITEC Bangna.

The theme was "อ่านเท่" (Arn The), meaning "Read Cool."

- The 54th National Book Fair & 24th Bangkok International Book Fair

Held from March 26 to April 6, 2026, at the Queen Sirikit National Convention Center.

The theme was "Read the Legend."

=== "Book Expo Thailand" (October–November) ===
- The 20th Book Expo Thailand in 2015

Held from October 21 - November 1, 2015, at the Queen Sirikit National Convention Center.

- The 25th Book Expo Thailand in 2020

Held from September 30 - October 11, 2020, at Challenger Hall 2, IMPACT Muang Thong Thani.

The theme was "Noกองดอง" (Kong Dong), meaning "No Unread Book Pile."

- The 30th Book Expo Thailand in 2025

Held from October 9–19, 2025, at Hall 5–7, LG Floor, Queen Sirikit National Convention Center.

The theme is “Melody of Books: อ่านหรือยัง ฟังหรือเปล่า" (Arn Rue Yang Fung Rue Plao), meaning "Did You Read? Did You Listen?".
