= Ratchadamri BTS station =

Railway station in Bangkok, Thailand

Ratchadamri ราชดำริ
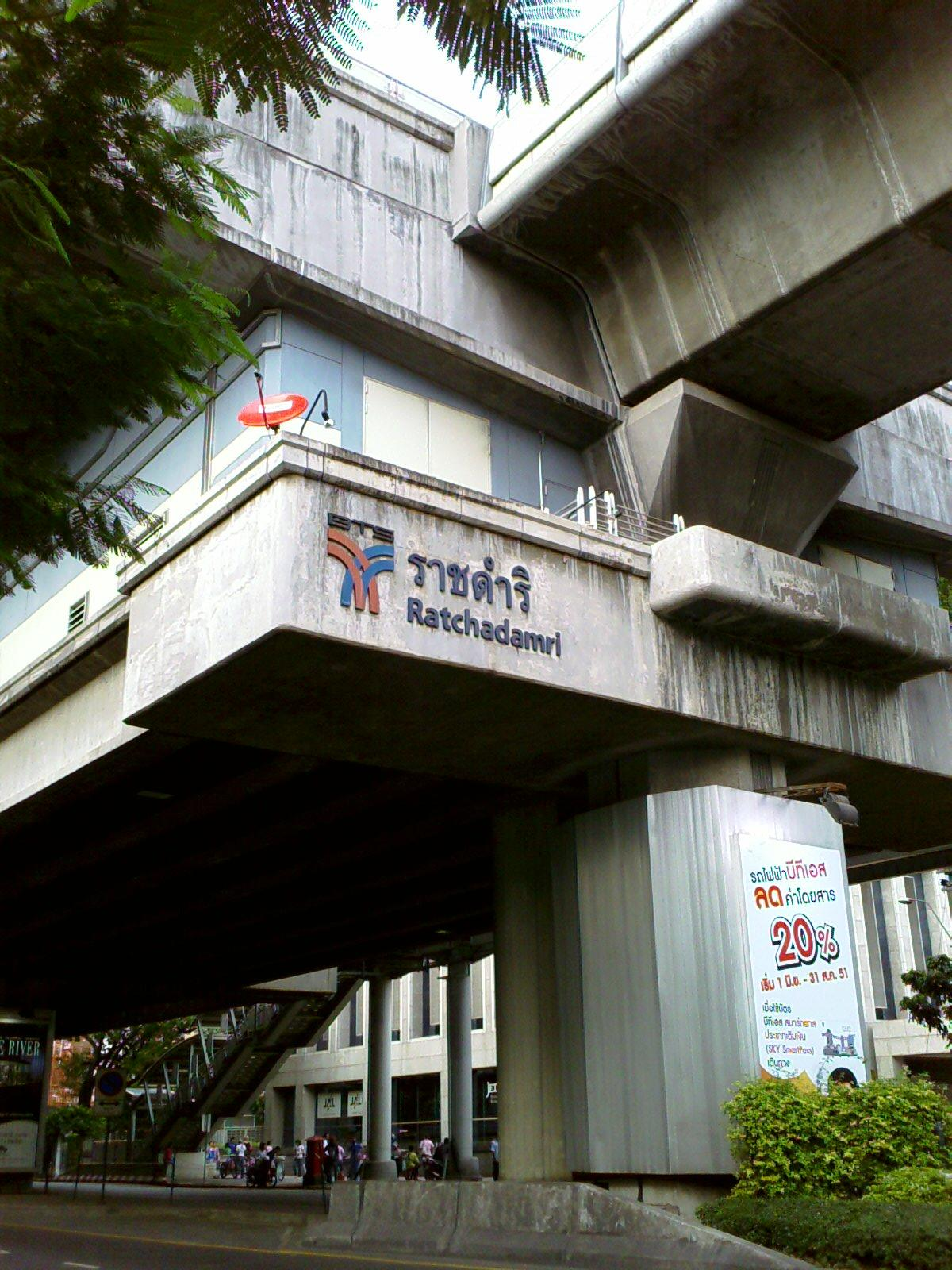

General information
- Location: Pathum Wan; Bangkok; Thailand
- Coordinates: 13°44′21.09″N 100°32′21.87″E
- Owner: Bangkok Metropolitan Administration (BMA); BTS Rail Mass Transit Growth Infrastructure Fund (BTSGIF)
- Operator: Bangkok Mass Transit System; Public Company Limited (BTSC)
- Line: Silom Line
- Platforms: 2
- Tracks: 2
- Connections: BMTA Bus

Construction
- Structure type: Elevated
- Accessible: yes

Other information
- Station code: S1

History
- Opened: 5 December 1999; 26 years ago
- Electrified: Third rail 750 V DC

Passengers
- 2021: 525,739

Services
Preceding station	BTS Skytrain	Following station
Siam towards National Stadium	Silom Line	Sala Daeng towards Bang Wa
Location

Ratchadamri station (Thai: สถานีราชดำริ, pronounced [sā.tʰǎː.nīː râːt.t͡ɕʰā.dām.rìʔ]) is a BTS skytrain station, on the Silom line in Pathum Wan District, Bangkok, Thailand. The station is on Ratchadamri Road between Ratchaprasong intersection and Lumphini Park, amid condominiums, office towers, hotels, and the Royal Bangkok Sports Club racetrack. There is a skyway from the station concourse to St Regis hotel.

== Station layout ==
U3; Platform	Side platform, doors will open on the left
U3; Platform	Platform 4	Silom Line toward National Stadium (Siam)
U3; Platform	Platform 3	Silom Line toward Bang Wa (Sala Daeng)
U3; Platform	Side platform, doors will open on the left
U2 ticket sales class	ticket sales floor	Exit 1–4, Passenger Service Center; Ticket Office, Ticket Machine, Shop
G Street level	-	Bus Stop, American Alumni Association Under Royal Patronage (A.U.A.); Anantara Bangkok Siam Hotel, Nanthawan Building, Anonymous Clinic, AIDS Research Center, Thai Red Cross Society

== Bus connections ==
- 13: Khlong Toei–Huai Khwang
- 15: The Mall Thapra–Banglamphu
- 76: Samae Dam–Pratunam
- 77: CentralPlaza Rama III–Morchit 2 (operated with Private Joint)
- 505: Pakkret–Lumphini Park
- 514: Min Buri–Silom
- A3: Don Mueang International Airport–Lumphini Park
