= Chanut =

Chanut is a given name and surname. Notable people with the name include:

- Chanut Piyaoui (born 1924), Thai businesswoman and entrepreneur
- Denis Gargaud Chanut (born 1987), French slalom canoeist
- Pierre Chanut (1601–1662), French state counsellor and ambassador in Sweden
