= Chanut Piyaoui =

Thai hotelier (1922–2020)

Than Phu Ying Chanut Piyaoui
- Born: 15 May 1922; Bangkok, Siam
- Died: 3 May 2020 (aged 97); Bangkok, Thailand
- Occupations: Hotelier, businesswoman
- Years active: 1948–2020
- Known for: Chairperson of Dusit International

Than Phu Ying Chanut Piyaoui (Thai: ท่านผู้หญิงชนัตถ์ ปิยะอุย, 15 May 1922 – 3 May 2020) was a Thai businesswoman and entrepreneur best known as the founder of Thai hospitality group Dusit International. She served as the managing director and chairperson of Dusit International from 1970 to 2014, and held the post of honorary chairman.

== Life and career ==
Than Phu Ying Chanut was born in Bangkok, Thailand. Her father was a businessman who owned a saw mill in Bangkok and her mother ran a rice mill outside the city. In 1946, Chanut went to the United States hoping to attend Columbia University. Having been unsuccessful in her attempt to gain entrance due to her level of English, she attended an English school in New York City. After completing her studies, she traveled the country, becoming fascinated with the hotels she visited for their modern facilities and quality of service.

Upon returning home in 1947, she aspired to build a hotel that would be like the ones she had visited in the US, but with a distinctively Thai touch. In 1948, Chanut opened her first hotel, the "Princess" on Bangkok's New Road. It had only 30 rooms but had the distinction of being the first modern hotel in Bangkok with a swimming pool. The hotel was the accommodation of choice for the flight crews of Pan American Airways (Pan Am) for several years.

Chanut took the opportunity to join Pan Am's "80 Days Around the World" program to fly around the world. The trip helped her to get valuable information and insights in the hotel trade that she could incorporate into her own business as a means of improving it. In 1970, Chanut founded the luxury Dusit Thani Hotel near Lumphini Park that became the flagship hotel of the Dusit Group. It was the first luxury hotel in Bangkok and quickly achieved widespread popularity among locals and foreigners. The 510-room hotel was the tallest building in Bangkok for several years. The Dusit Thani was one of the Thai hotels that attracted foreign visitors and helped tourism overtake rice exports as the leading source of income in 1983.

Since the formation of Dusit Thani Group, Chanut served as the managing director and advisor to the board of the directors. In 1987 she acquired a hotel which was renovated to become the first resort property, Dusit Thani Pattaya, followed by another beach resort in Phuket, the Dusit Thani Laguna Phuket. In 1989, a polo club and resort was opened in Cha-am. In the 1990s, four more luxury resorts and hotels, the Royal Princess Chiang Mai, Dusit Island Resort Chiang Rai, Dusit Princess Korat, and the Dusit Princess Srinakarin Hotel opened in Thailand.

In the 1990s, she had a conflict with the building of a 243 kilometre Metropolitan Rapid Transit subway system, which passed near the Dusit Thani Hotel and needed access to some of its valuable land that was used for parking.

Chanut made the first International expansion of Dusit Brand in 1995 with the acquisition of Dusit Hotel Nikko Manila in the Philippines. After the acquisition the hotel came under the management of Dusit Thani Hotels & Resorts, and was renamed the Dusit Hotel Nikko, Manila. Continuing the expansion, the group opened its first property in the Middle East in 2001 in Dubai, and later entered India, China, United States and the Maldives.

In 2001, Chanut introduced the Devarana Spa which now operates at 10 Dusit properties.

Chanut's leading hotel chain has grown both in Thailand and internationally. The group now operates 13 hotels and resorts across Thailand and 18 properties around the world under five hotel brands: Dusit Thani Hotels & Resorts; dusitD2 Hotels and Resorts; Dusit Princess Hotel and Resorts; Dusit Devarana Hotels and Resorts; and Dusit Residence Serviced Apartments.

In 1993, Chanut established Dusit Thani College in order to support Dusit International's expansion by providing hotel vocational training in Thailand. The Dusit group now has two hotel schools in Thailand offering bachelor's degrees of business administration in kitchen and restaurant management. It also has a culinary school, a joint venture with Le Cordon Bleu opened in 2007. In 2009 Dusit Thani College initiated a program with Lyceum University in the Philippines which opened in June 2009 with over 4,000 enrolled. A new hospitality school with fully integrated hotel opened in Manila in 2017.

In 2014, Chanut retired from the position of managing director, handing it over to her son, Chanin Donavanik. She then served as the honorary chairperson of Dusit Thani Group.

In 2020, Chanut died due to circulatory failure on 3 May 2020, at the age of 97. Later, on August 23 of the same year, Princess Royal Sirindhorn went to the Royal Crematorium in front of the orphanage of Wat Debsirindrawas Ratchaworawiharn for the royal cremation.

== Awards and recognition ==
For her achievements in the Thai hospitality industry, Chanut received the title Than Phu Ying, an esteemed royal title bestowed by Thailand. She was awarded several honorary degrees: Doctor of Business Administration in Hospitality Management awarded by Johnson & Wales University; Doctor of Tourism and Hotels from Sripatum University; and Doctor of Arts in Tourism Industry from Mahidol University.
