= Dusit Central Park =

Mixed-use development in Bangkok, Thailand

Coordinates: 13°43′42″N 100°32′14″E

- Dusit Central Park in 2026
- Interactive map of Dusit Central Park

Companies
- Owner: Dusit International

Dusit Central Park is a mixed-use skyscraper development in the Bang Rak district of Bangkok, Thailand. It occupies a 23-rai (3.7 ha; 9.1-acre) site on the corner of Sala Daeng Intersection at the beginning of Si Lom Road in Bangkok's financial district, replacing the old Dusit Thani Hotel which stood there from 1970 to 2019. Conceived as a joint-venture between hotel-owner Dusit International and property developer Central Pattana, its location overlooking the vast expanse of Lumphini Park makes it a prime real estate property, with a project value of 46 billion baht (US$1.5bn in 2019).

The complex comprises three skyscrapers: a new hotel, a residential tower and an office tower, connected by an eight-storey retail podium featuring a rooftop park. It is among several high-profile development projects emerging around the central green space of Lumphini Park, along with One Bangkok and Sindhorn Village.
