= Lumphini MRT station =

MRT station in Bangkok, Thailand

Coordinates: 13.7256°N 100.5460°E

ลุมพินี BL25 Lumphini
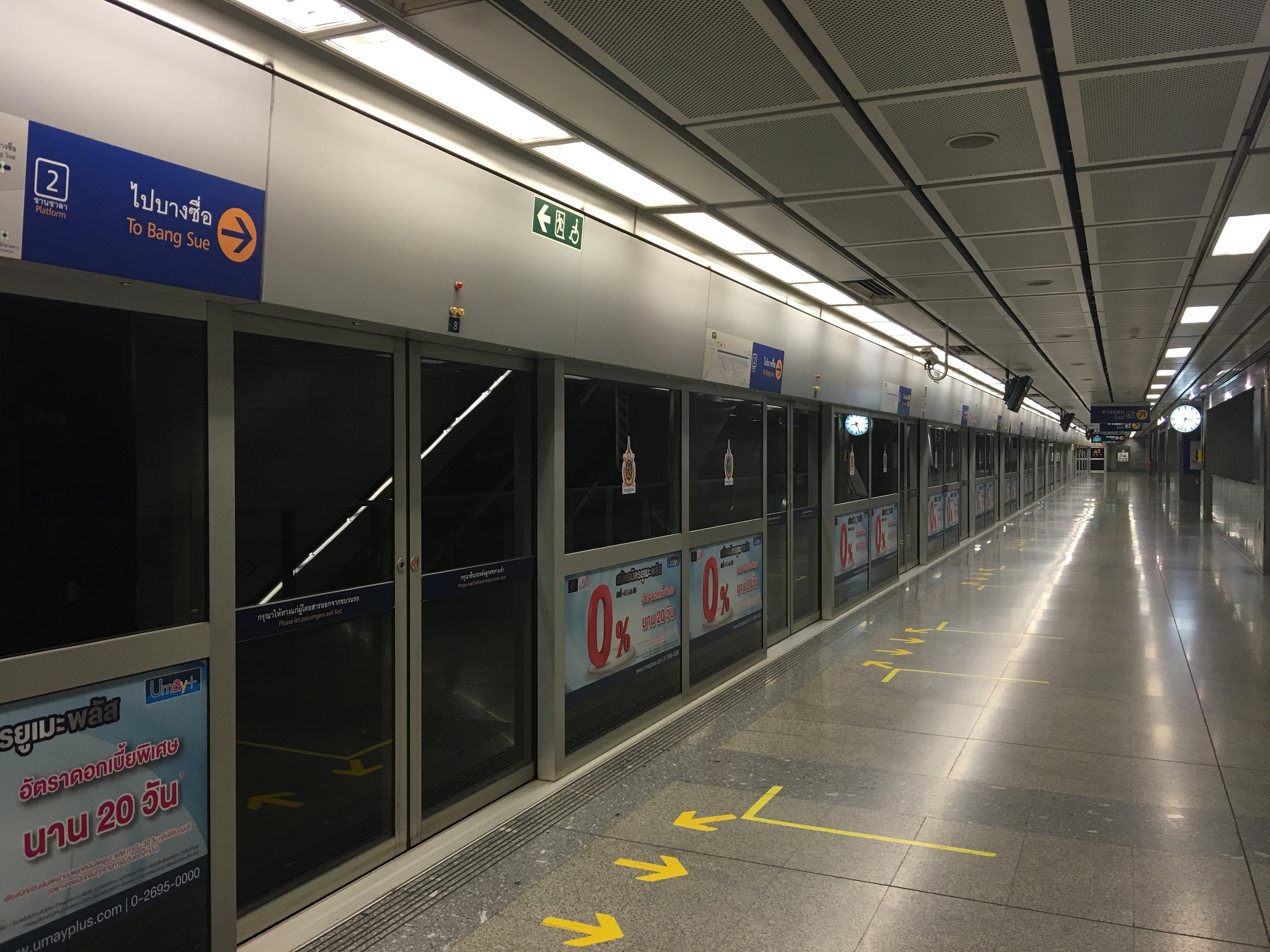

General information
- Location: Rama IV Road, Sathon and Pathum Wan, Bangkok, Thailand
- System: MRT
- Owner: Mass Rapid Transit Authority of Thailand (MRTA)
- Operator: Bangkok Expressway and Metro Public Company Limited (BEM)
- Line: MRT MRT Blue Line
- Platforms: 2 split platform

Construction
- Structure type: Underground
- Accessible: yes

Other information
- Station code: BL25

History
- Opened: 3 July 2004; 22 years ago

Passengers
- 2021: 2,702,001

Services
Preceding station	Metropolitan Rapid Transit	Following station
Si Lom towards Lak Song	Blue Line	Khlong Toei towards Tha Phra via Bang Sue
Location

Lumphini MRT station (Thai: สถานีลุมพินี, pronounced [sā.tʰǎː.nīː lūm.pʰī.nīː]; code BL25) is a Bangkok MRT station on the Blue Line. It is located beneath Rama IV Road at Witthayu Intersection, where Witthayu intersects Rama IV road, serving one of the city's main business districts. Although the station's name refers to Lumphini Park, the king Vajiravudh monument which is the main sight of the park is closer to Sala Daeng Intersection, which is served by Si Lom and Sala Daeng BTS station.

== Station layout ==
G At-grade	Street level	Bus stop, Rama IV Road, Witthayu Road, Lumphini Park
B1; Concourse	Concourse Level	Exits 1A (closest exit to Soi Ngam Duphli), 1B (Underground walkway to One Bangkok), 2 (exit to Northern Sathorn road) and 3 (exit to Witthayu Road, across the road is Lumphini park); and Ticket Vending Machines
B2; Platform	Platform 2	Blue towards Tha Phra via Bang Sue (Khlong Toei)
B2; Platform	Side platform, doors will open on the right
B4; Platform	Platform 1	Blue towards Lak Song (Si Lom)
B4; Platform	Side platform, doors will open on the left

== Station details ==
Lumphini is an underground station, measuring at a width of 20 metres (66 ft) and a length of 172 metres (564 ft), and is at a depth of 26 metres (85 ft). It uses a split platform due to half of Rama IV Road containing some of the Metropolitan Waterworks Authority's pipes. Lumphini is represented by the lotus symbol and the color green.
