= Si Lom MRT station =

Mass Rapid Transit station in Thailand

Coordinates: 13.7292°N 100.5375°E

สีลม Si Lom
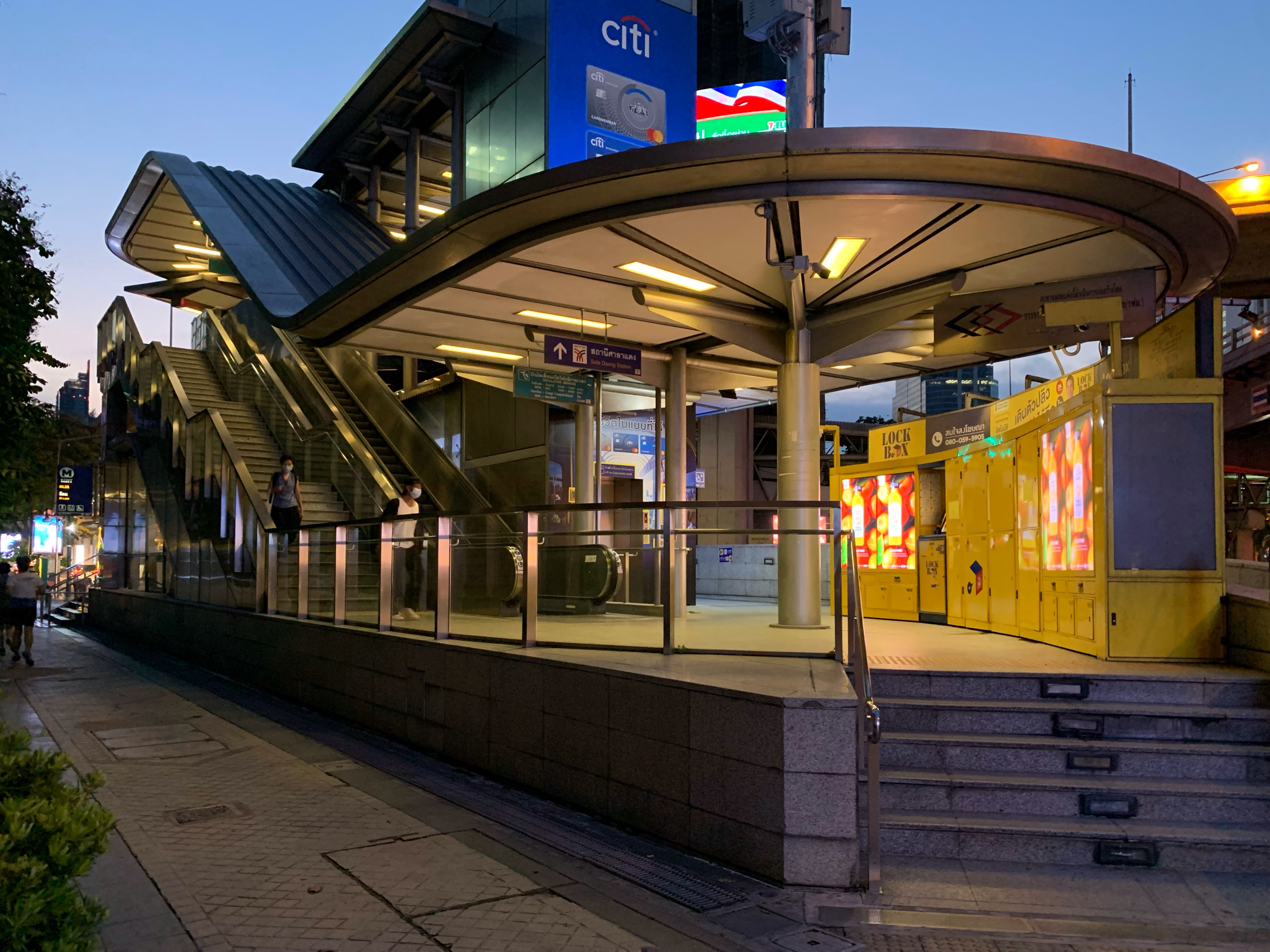
- Si Lom Station entrance and connection with Sala Daeng BTS Station

General information
- Location: Bang Rak and Pathum Wan, Thailand
- System: MRT
- Owner: Mass Rapid Transit Authority of Thailand (MRTA)
- Operator: Bangkok Expressway and Metro Public Company Limited (BEM)
- Line: MRT MRT Blue Line
- Platforms: 2 split platform (2 exits, 2 elevators)
- Connections: BTS BTS Silom Line (Off-station connection)

Construction
- Structure type: Underground

Other information
- Station code: BL26
- Website: BMCL Website

History
- Opened: 3 July 2004; 22 years ago

Passengers
- 2021: 5,333,875

Services
Preceding station	Metropolitan Rapid Transit	Following station
Sam Yan towards Lak Song	Blue Line	Lumphini towards Tha Phra via Bang Sue
Location

Si Lom station (Thai: สถานีสีลม, pronounced [sā.tʰǎː.nīː sǐː lōm]) is an underground station of the Bangkok MRT, on the Blue Line in Bangkok, Thailand. The station is located beneath Rama IV Road at Sala Daeng Intersection, where Si Lom Road begins, serving one of the city's main business districts.

== Station ==
Si Lom station is the 26th station on the Blue Line, lying between the Lumphini and Sam Yan stations on a section of the line running beneath Rama IV Road. It has been described as the most challenging to construct of the Blue Line, since it lies beneath the Thai–Japan Bridge that crosses Sala Daeng Intersection, requiring a complex underpinning process to replace the bridge's original foundations. The station features two vertically stacked platforms beneath the main concourse level, which is deeper than that of other stations to accommodate the bridge foundations. At a depth reaching 30 metres (98 ft), it is the deepest station in the MRT system, and features the longest escalator in Southeast Asia.

Si Lom station is connected to Sala Daeng BTS station by a covered elevated walkway, and forms one of the three original main links between the MRT and BTS systems. The station has two exits: one on the northeast corner of the intersection, near the entrance to Lumphini Park, and the other, which connects to the skywalk, on the south corner in front of the Dusit Thani Hotel (now under redevelopment).

== Station layout ==
FB; Footbridge	-	Walk way to Sala Daeng BTS Station and King Chulalongkorn Memorial Hospital
G Ground floor	Street level	Bus Stop, Lumphini Park, Dusit Thani Hotel
B1; Concourse	Concourse Level	Exits 1–2, and Ticket Vending Machines
B2; Platform	Side Platform, Doors will open on the left.
B2; Platform	Platform 2	Blue towards Tha Phra via Bang Sue (Lumphini)
B4; Platform	Side Platform, Doors will open on the right.
B4; Platform	Platform 1	Blue towards Lak Song (Sam Yan)

== Gallery ==
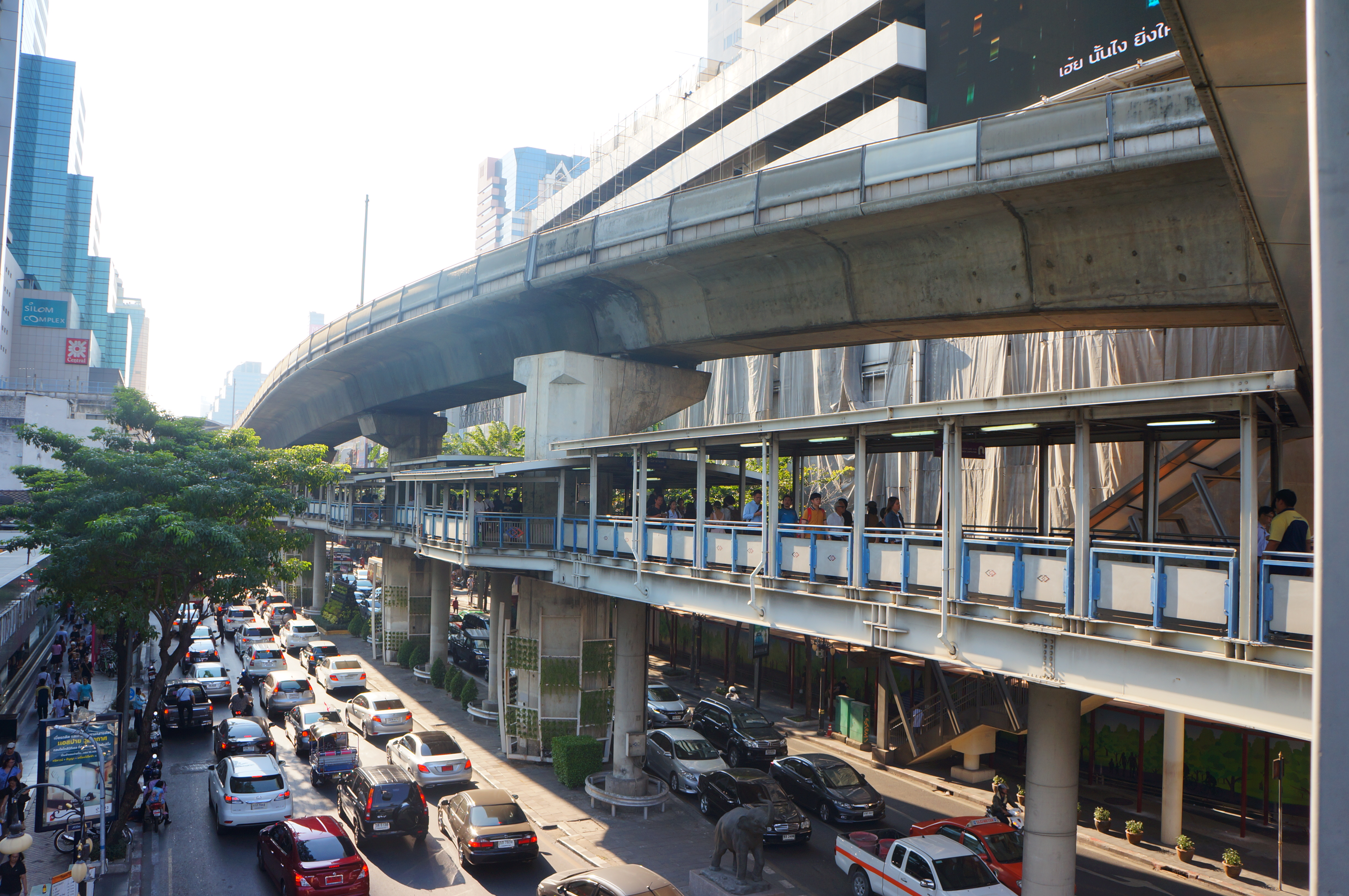
The skywalk linking Si Lom station and Sala Daeng Station
