= Lumpini Park Hawker Centre =

- ศูนย์อาหาร Hawker Center สวนลุมพินี

General information
- Status: Completed
- Location: Ratchadamri Road, Bangkok, Thailand
- Construction started: 27 June 2025
- Opening: 10 April 2026
- Landlord: Bangkok Metropolitan Administration

The Lumpini Park Hawker Centre (Thai: ศูนย์อาหาร Hawker Center สวนลุมพินี) hawker centre adjacent to Lumpini Park on Ratchadamri Road in Bangkok, Thailand, opened in April 2026.

Modeled after Singapore's hawker centres, Lumpini Park Hawker Centre is operated by the Bangkok Metropolitan Administration (BMA). The centre operates in two shifts, the first from 5 AM to 4 PM and the second from 4 PM to midnight. Each shift accommodates 88 street food vendors.

== History ==
On 27 June 2025, construction for the Hawker Centre began.

Lumpini Park Hawker Centre opened on 10 April 2026, according to Governor of Bangkok Chadchart Sittipunt.
