= Lumphini Park =

Public park in Bangkok, Thailand

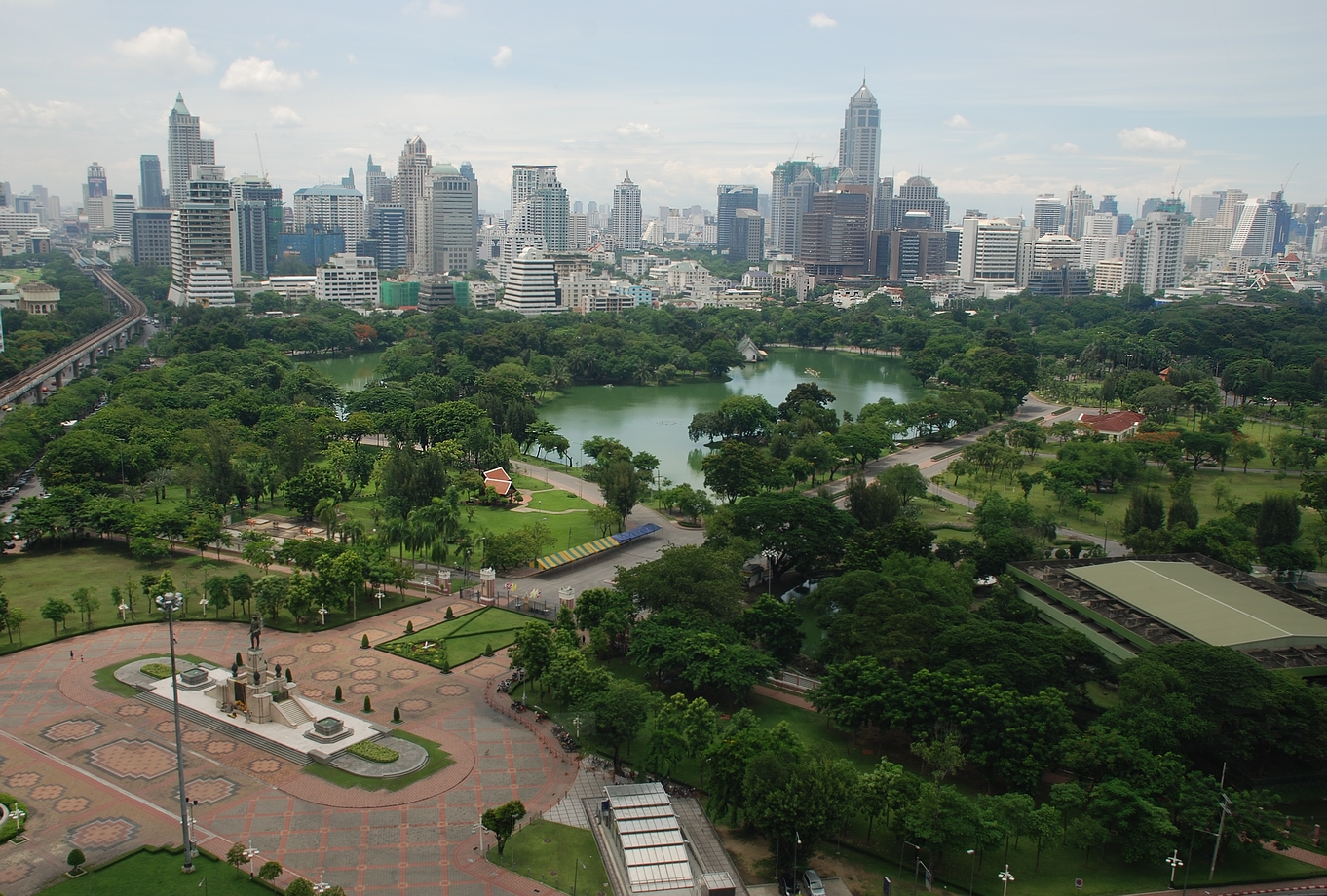
- Aerial view of Lumphini Park
- Interactive map of Lumphini Park
- Type: Urban Park
- Location: Lumphini, Pathum Wan, Bangkok
- Coordinates: 13°43′50″N 100°32′30″E
- Area: 57 hectares (140 acres)
- Created: 1925
- Operator: Bangkok Metropolitan Administration
- Visitors: about 10,000–15,000 people a day
- Status: Open daily from 4.30 a.m. to 9.00 p.m.
- Public transit: Sala Daeng station Si Lom station & Lumphini station BMTA Bus / Affiliated Bus; Taxi / Motorcycle taxi

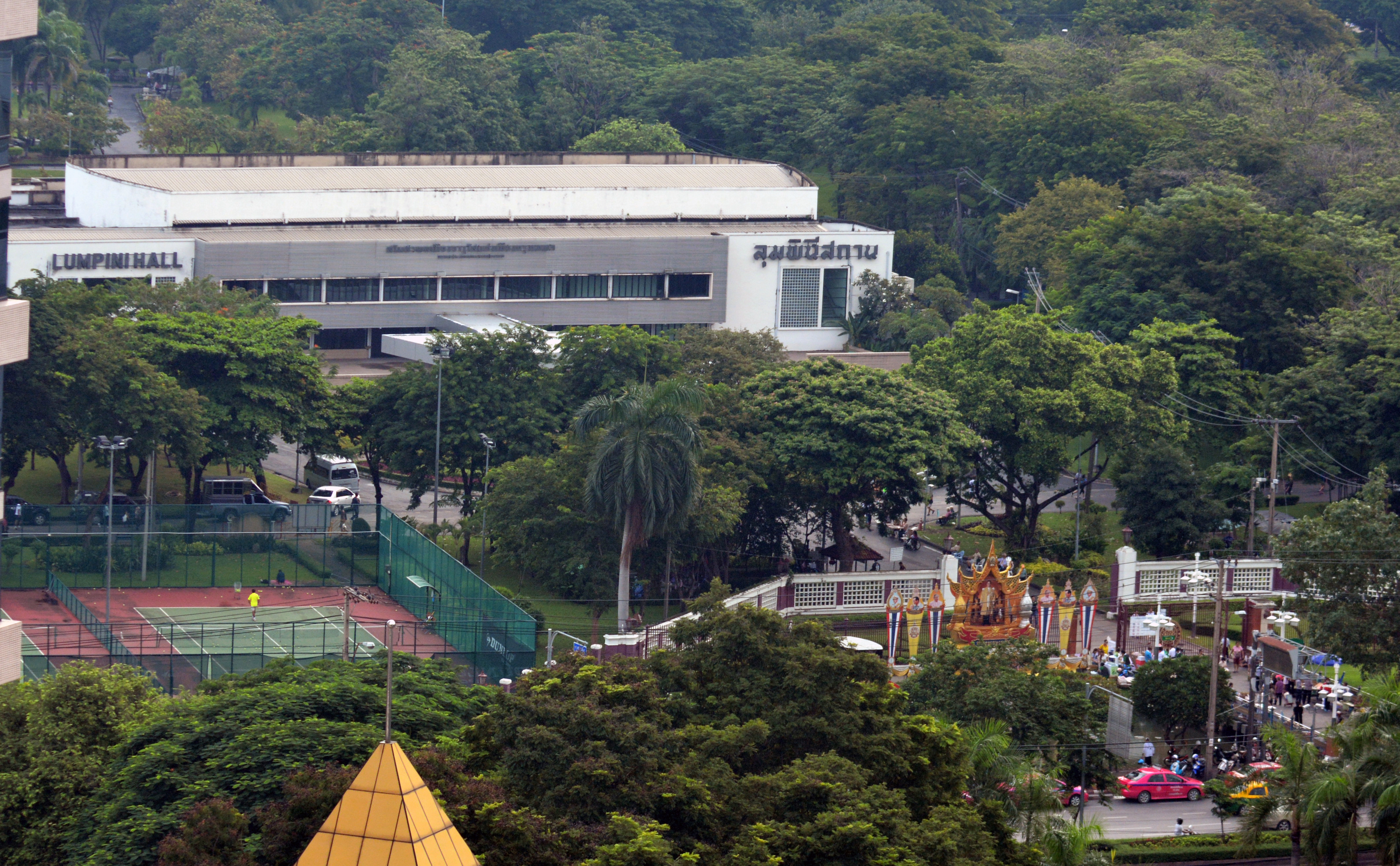
Lumphini Hall

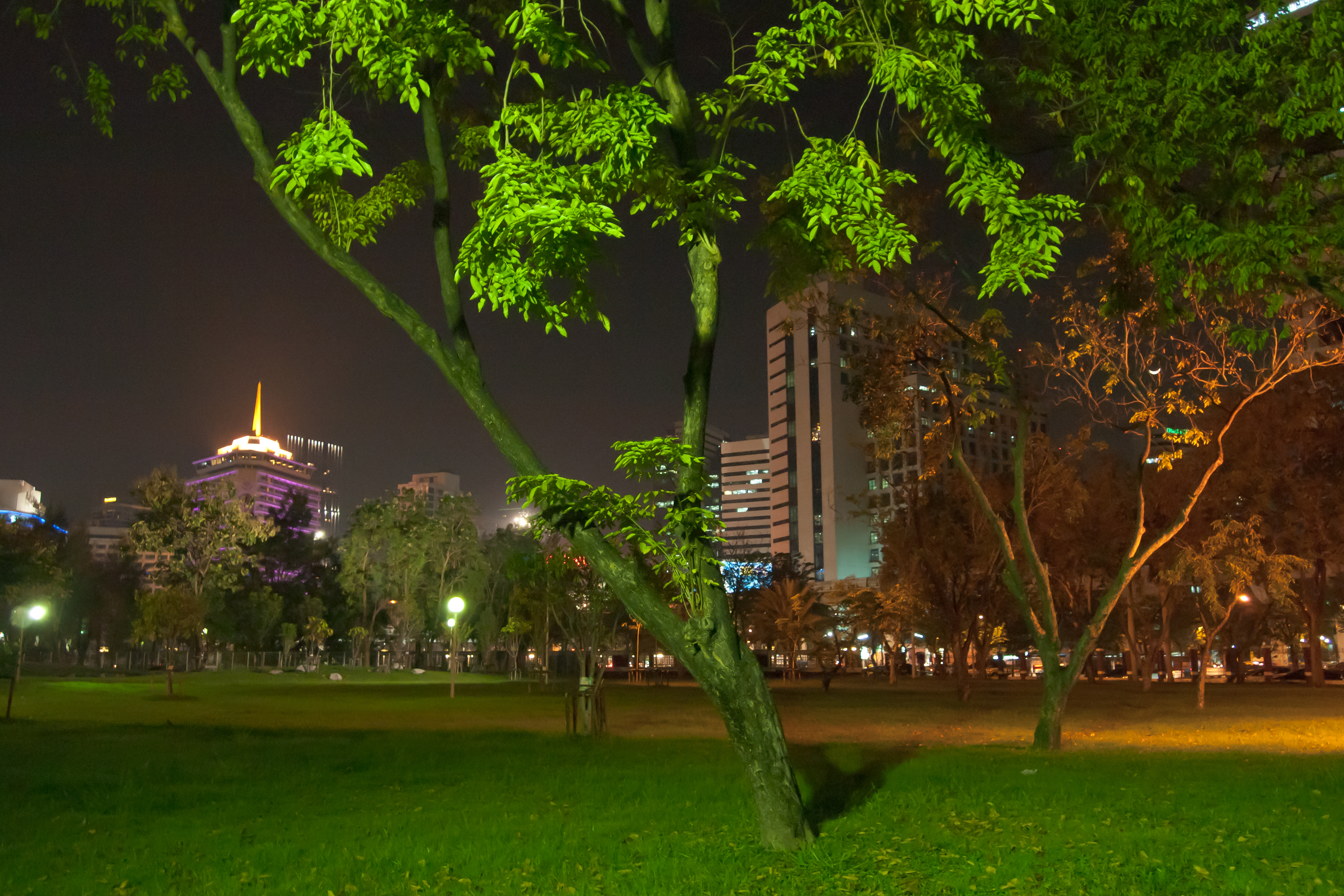
Trees in Lumphini Park at night

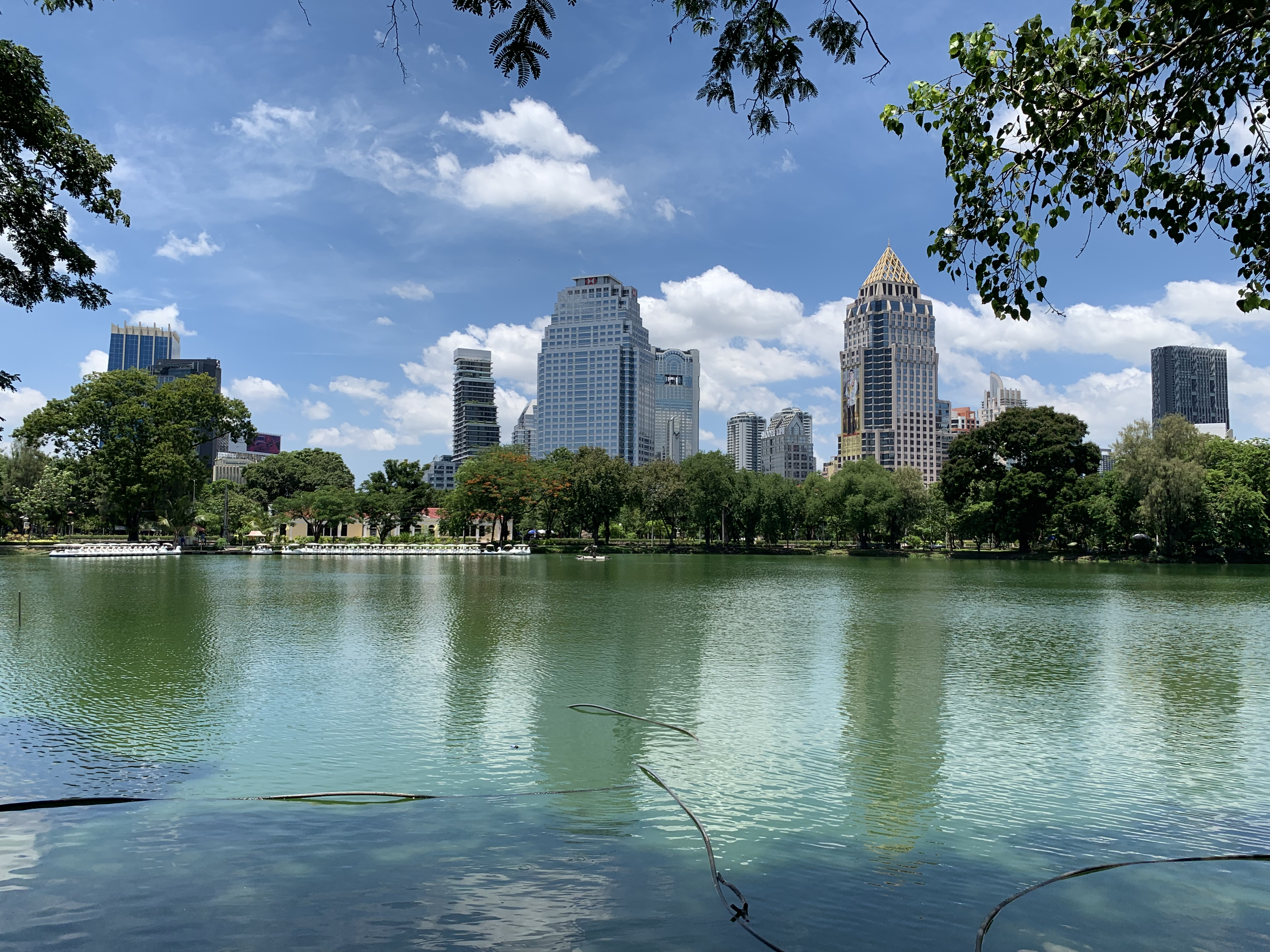
View towards the Silom-Sathorn districts

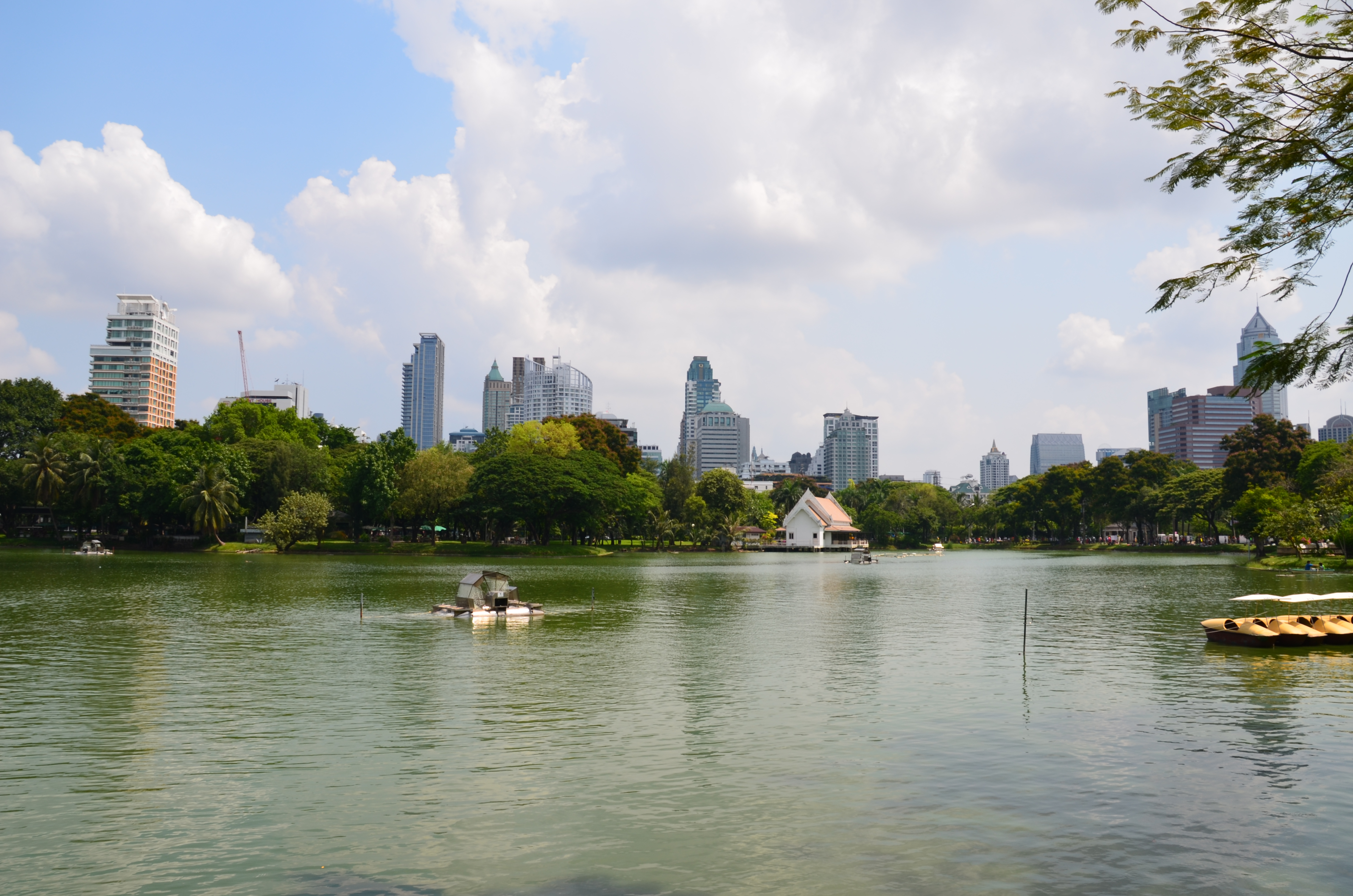
View towards the Ratchadamri-Ratchaphrasong districts

Lumphini Park (Thai: สวนลุมพินี, RTGS: Suan Lumphini, pronounced [sǔan lūm.pʰī.nīː]), also Lumpini or Lumpinee, is a 360 rai (57.6-hectare (142-acre)) park in Bangkok, Thailand. The park offers rare open public space, trees and playgrounds in the Thai capital and contains an artificial lake where visitors can rent boats. Paths around the park totalling approximately 2.5 km in length are a popular area for morning and evening joggers. Officially, cycling is only permitted during the day between the times of 10:00 am to 03:00 pm. There is a smoking ban throughout the park. Dogs are not allowed, except certified guide dogs only. Lumphini Park is regarded as the first public park in Bangkok and Thailand. The park is the provenance of Lumpinee Boxing Stadium.

Witthayu, Rama IV and Ratchadamri act as the eastern, southern and western border of Lumphini Park respectively. Witthayu intersection, an intersection where Witthayu and Rama IV roads meet, is served by Lumphini station on the Blue Line. Sala Daeng, an intersection where Ratchadamri, Rama IV and Si Lom roads meet, is served by Si Lom station on the Blue Line and Sala Daeng station on the BTS Skytrain's Silom Line. Other places surrounding Sala Daeng intersection are Dusit Central Park (where the old Dusit Thani Hotel once stood), King Chulalongkorn Memorial Hospital, and Silom Edge.

== History ==
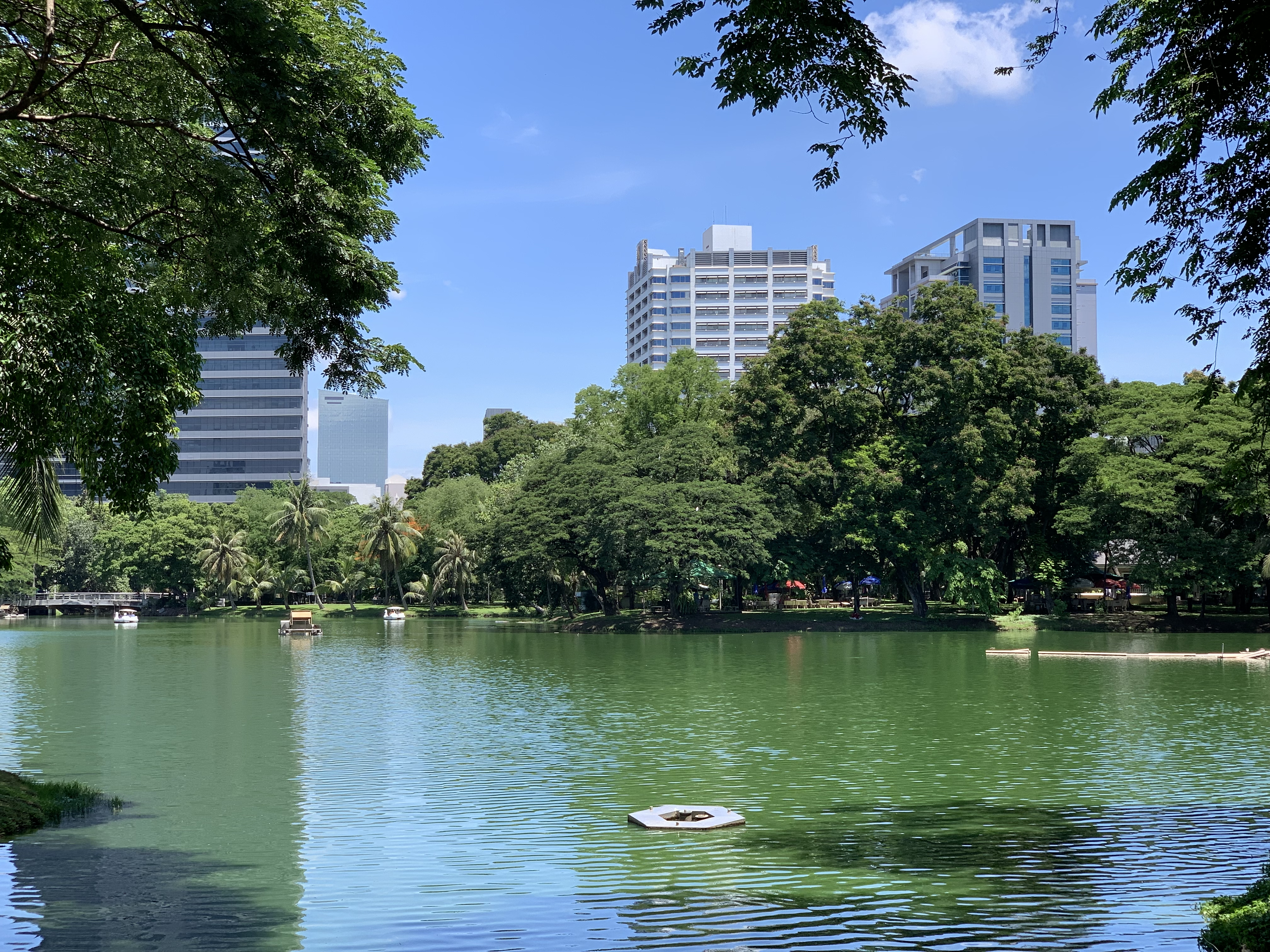
Lumphini Park

The 360 rai (about 57 hectares) plot of land, formerly known as Thung Sala Daeng ('Sala Daeng Field', now Sala Daeng Intersection), was the private property of King Rama VI. In 1925, the king donated the land to the nation to be used as a fair ground. The Siamrat Phiphitthaphan Trade Fair was held here to promote Thai commodities and industrial productions among Thais and foreigners. After the fair, the king had a will to turn the land into a public park which was given the name Lumphini. It was named after Lumbini, the birthplace of the Buddha in Nepal for prosperity, although its location at that time was considered the outskirts of the city. The construction was not finished yet, the king died first, but the construction continues until complete. In World War II the park was a Japanese Army camp. At the entrance in front of the park, the royal monument of the king was built for his memorial, inside the park, there are a clock tower of Chinese styled structure built in 1925, a public library which was the first one in the country, a public aquarium, children's play ground, sporting ground, and large swimming pool. It is a public park full of varieties of plants and suitable for recreational.

Today, it lies in the heart of the main business district and is in the Lumphini sub-district, on the north side of Rama IV Road, between Ratchadamri Road and Witthayu Road.

It is also linked to Benjakitti Park in Khlong Toei District via the 1.3 km-long Green Bridge, an elevated pedestrian and bicycle path that begins at the Sarasin Junction, where Witthayu Road meets Sarasin Road.

In August 2025, the Bangkok Metropolitan Administration announced that the Lumpini Park Hawker Centre would open along Ratchadamri Road in early 2026.

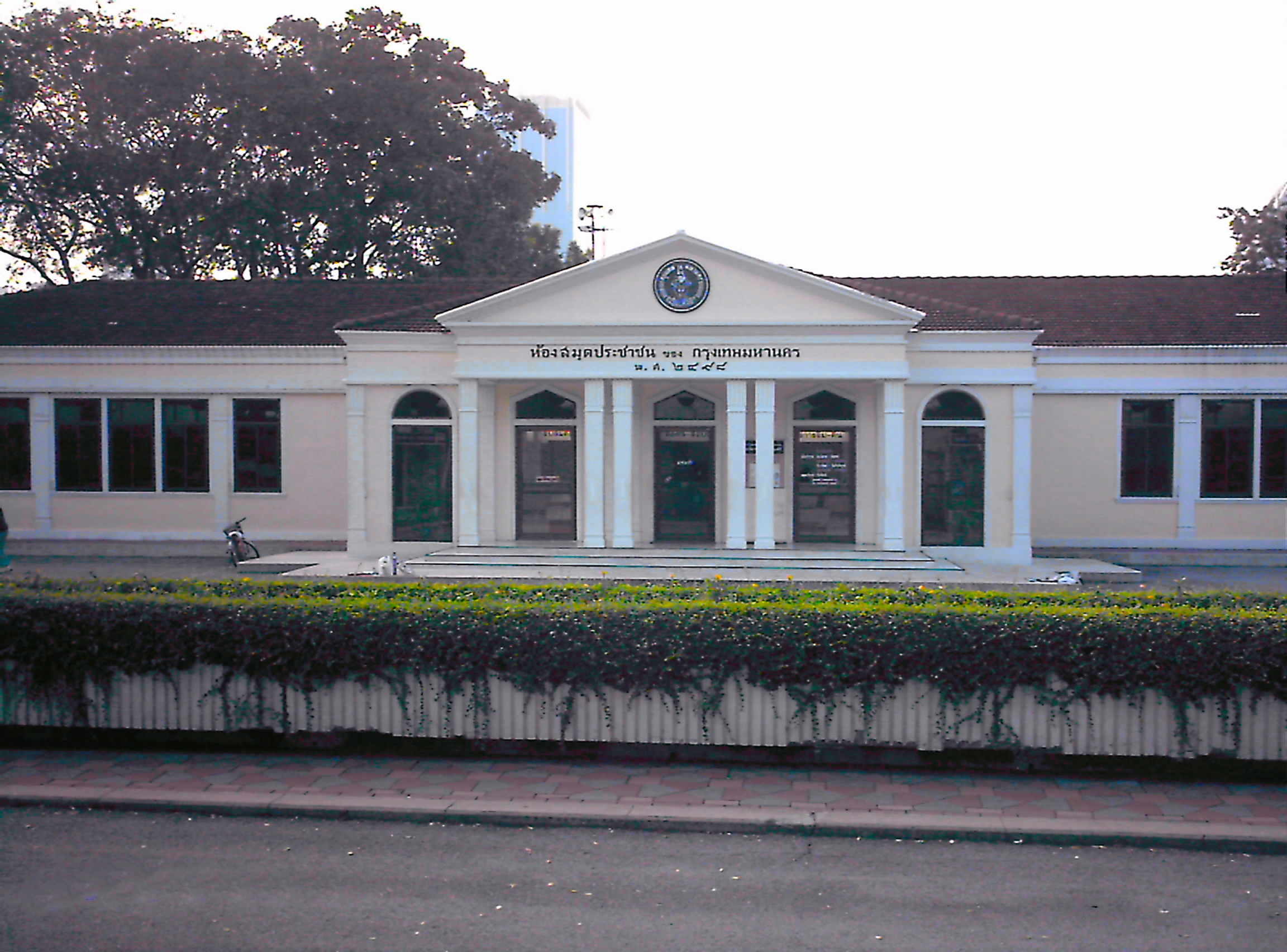
Lumphini Park Library

== Lumphini Park places ==
Lumphini Park is a multi-purpose park. Many activities are provided for citizens and tourists. The park is a green area. There are trees, flowers, lakes and animals.

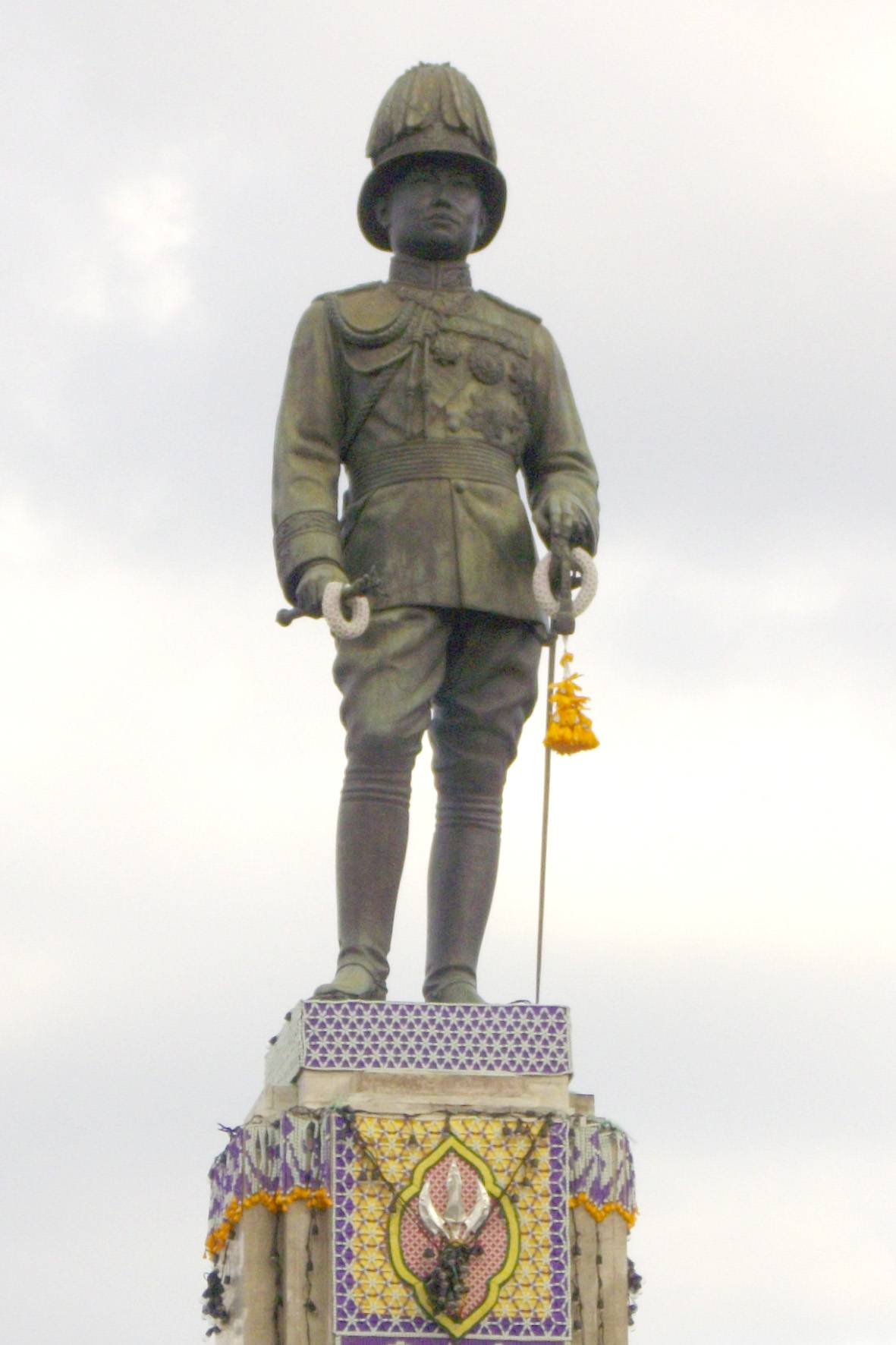
King Rama VI statue

- King Rama VI statue (Thai: พระบรมรูปรัชกาลที่6) - The statue of King Vajiravudh (Rama VI) was built in 1942 to commemorate the construction of the Lumphini Park.
- Bird watching - Lumphini Park is a rich source of natural food and has large trees so it has become home to more than 30 species of birds. Bird watching instruction is available at Lumphini Park every year.
- Smiling Sun Ground (also Larn Tawan Yim Thai: ลานตะวันยิ้ม) - Smiling Sun Ground is a place for activities for disabled people. It is full of resources and special parking lots for the disabled as well as playgrounds for children.
- Bangkok Elder Citizens Club (Thai: สโมสรพลเมืองอาวุโสแห่งเมืองกรุงเทพฯ) - Bangkok Elder Citizens Club is a place for elders to communicate, relax, exercise, and train. It is open from 08:00–18:00 daily. Dancing courses are available every Sunday-Saturday.
- Home of Hope (Thai: ศูนย์สร้างโอกาสเด็กสวนลุมพินี) - A refuge for homeless children. They provide information, advice, and education to help homeless children. It is open 10:00–19:00 daily.
- BMA Apprentice School (Thai: ศูนย์ฝึกอาชีพกรุงเทพมหานคร) - Offers training in various jobs including computer, cooking, tailor, and facial make-up.
- Lumphini Park Library (Thai: ห้องสมุดประชาชนสวนลุมพินี) - Lumphini Park Library provides books and videos. Open from 08:00–20:00, Tuesday–Sunday.
- Lumphini Youth Center (Thai: ศูนย์เยาวชนลุมพินี) - Offers sports activities and sports equipment for members. Sports activities including soccer, swimming, basketball, and dancing. On Monday to Friday it is open from 18:00–20:00. On weekends it is open 10:00–18:00.
- Sri Thai Derm Food Center (Thai: ศูนย์อาหารศรีไทยเดิม)- Open 04:30–10:00 daily.
- Lumphini Lake - Swan paddle boats can be rented at a lake for 40 baht per 30 minutes. In the 1960s, a floating restaurant called Kinnari Nava stood in the middle of the lake. Also known internationally as Peninsula, it was a distinctive structure featuring a bow atop a topless kinnari figure (a half-woman, half-bird). The restaurant was later closed following a fire.
- Buddhist Dharma Activities - Buddhist Dharma activities with Buddhist monks are held the last Sunday of every month from 07:00–09:00.
- Music Festival - A Western music and Thai music festival in the park is held Sundays, January to April, from 17:30–20:00.

== Venues and events ==
The park has Bangkok's first public library and dance hall. During winter, the Palm Garden of Lumphini Park becomes the site for the annual Concert in the Park featuring classical music by the Bangkok Symphony Orchestra and other bands.

== Political rallies ==
Lumphini Park has been used as a rally ground for right-wing political gatherings. In 2006 the People's Alliance for Democracy (PAD) protested in the park against Prime Minister Thaksin Shinawatra. In 2013-2014 the park became one of the main protest sites of the People's Democratic Reform Committee (PDRC) against Prime Minister Yingluck Shinawatra.

== Wildlife ==
The park is home to around 400 Asian water monitors. In 2016 a program to captured and relocate a number of the lizards was carried out in an attempt to control their numbers.
