= Ratchadamri Road =

Street in Bangkok, Thailand

Coordinates: 13°44′22.7″N 100°32′21.8″E

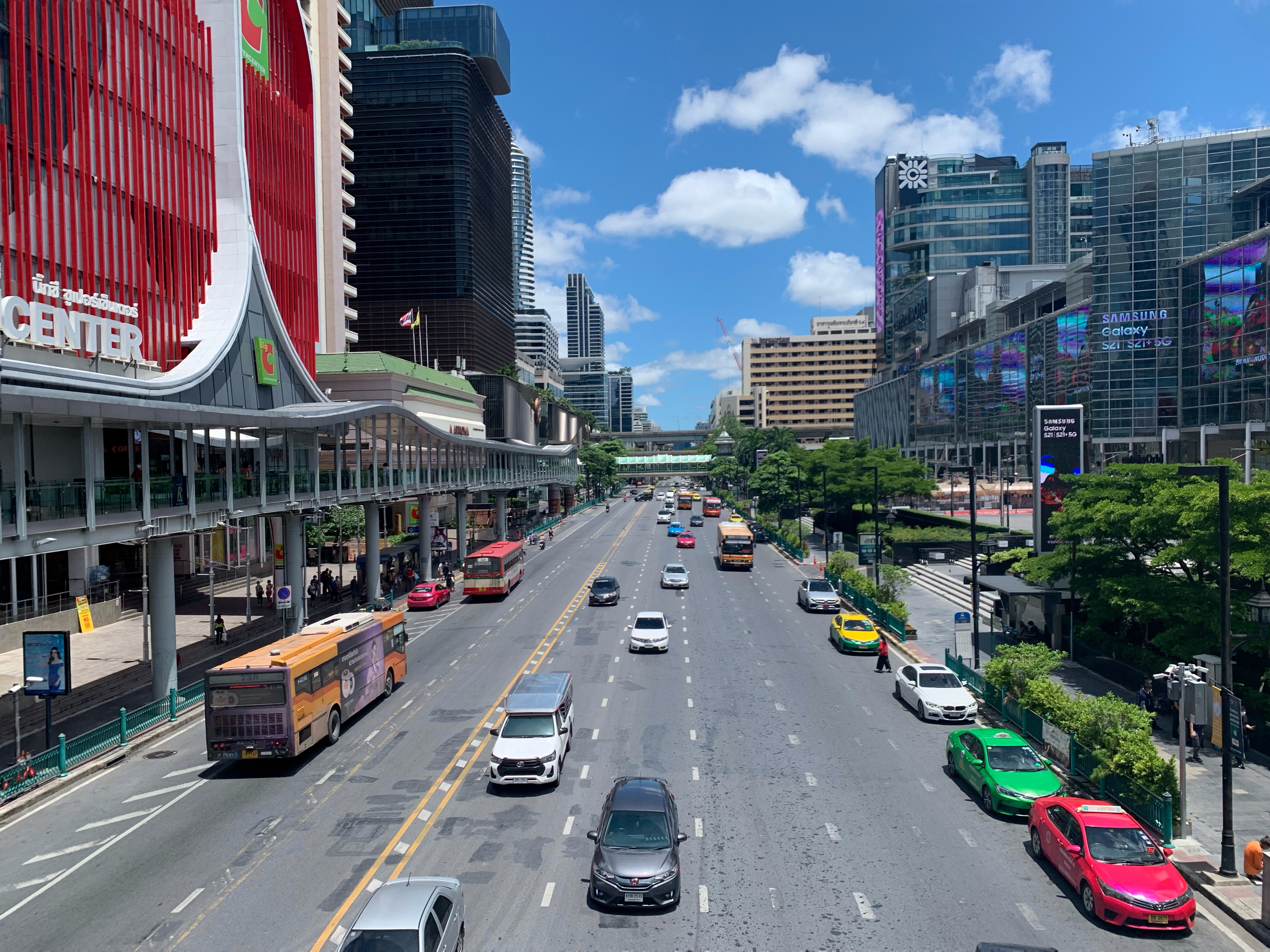
Ratchadamri Road at Central World, looking southwards

Ratchadamri Road (Thai: ถนนราชดำริ, RTGS: Thanon Ratchadamri, pronounced [tʰā.nǒn râːt.t͡ɕʰā.dām.rìʔ]; also spelled Rajdamri) is a road in Bangkok. It runs a distance of 2.3 kilometres (1.4 mi) in a north–south direction from Pratu Nam Intersection, where it meets Phetchaburi and Ratchaprarop Roads, to Sala Daeng Intersection, where it meets Rama IV and Si Lom Roads, forming the boundary between the Pathum Wan and Lumphini Subdistricts of Pathum Wan District. It passes through Ratchaprasong Intersection at the heart of Bangkok's main shopping district, as well as the green open spaces of the Royal Bangkok Sports Club and Lumphini Park, making its eponymous neighbourhood one of the top prime real estate locations in Bangkok.

The neighbourhood known as Ratchadamri is situated south of Ratchaprasong on the road's eastern side, opposite the Royal Bangkok Sports Club. It consists mostly of land owned by Vajiravudh College, purposely set aside by King Vajiravudh as the school's endowment. The area, served by the Ratchadamri Station of the BTS's Silom Line, is home to a large concentration of luxury condominiums and hotels, and has the most expensive condominium sell prices in Bangkok.

== Gallery ==
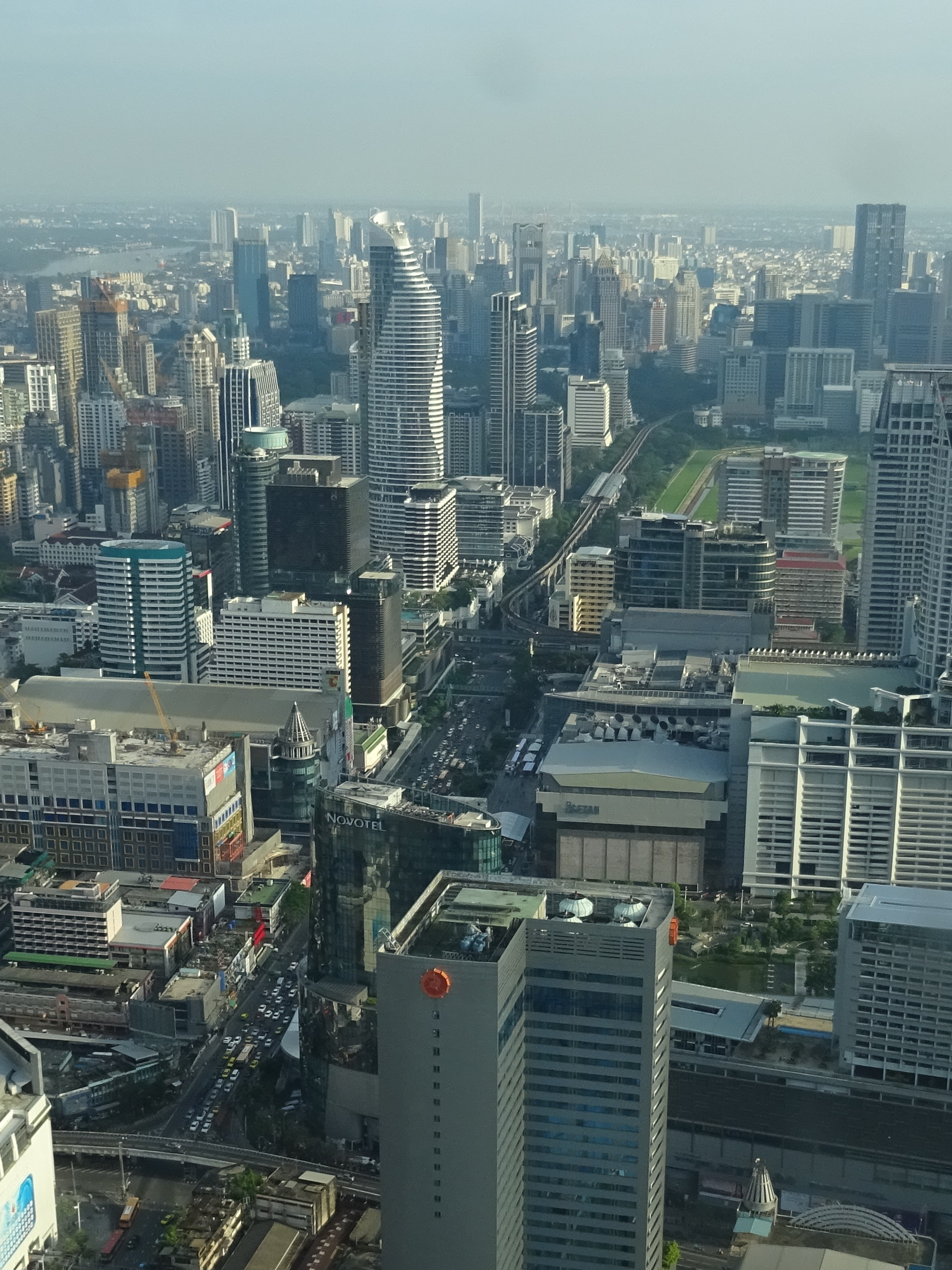
Ratchadamri Road, seen from Baiyoke Tower II in 2018

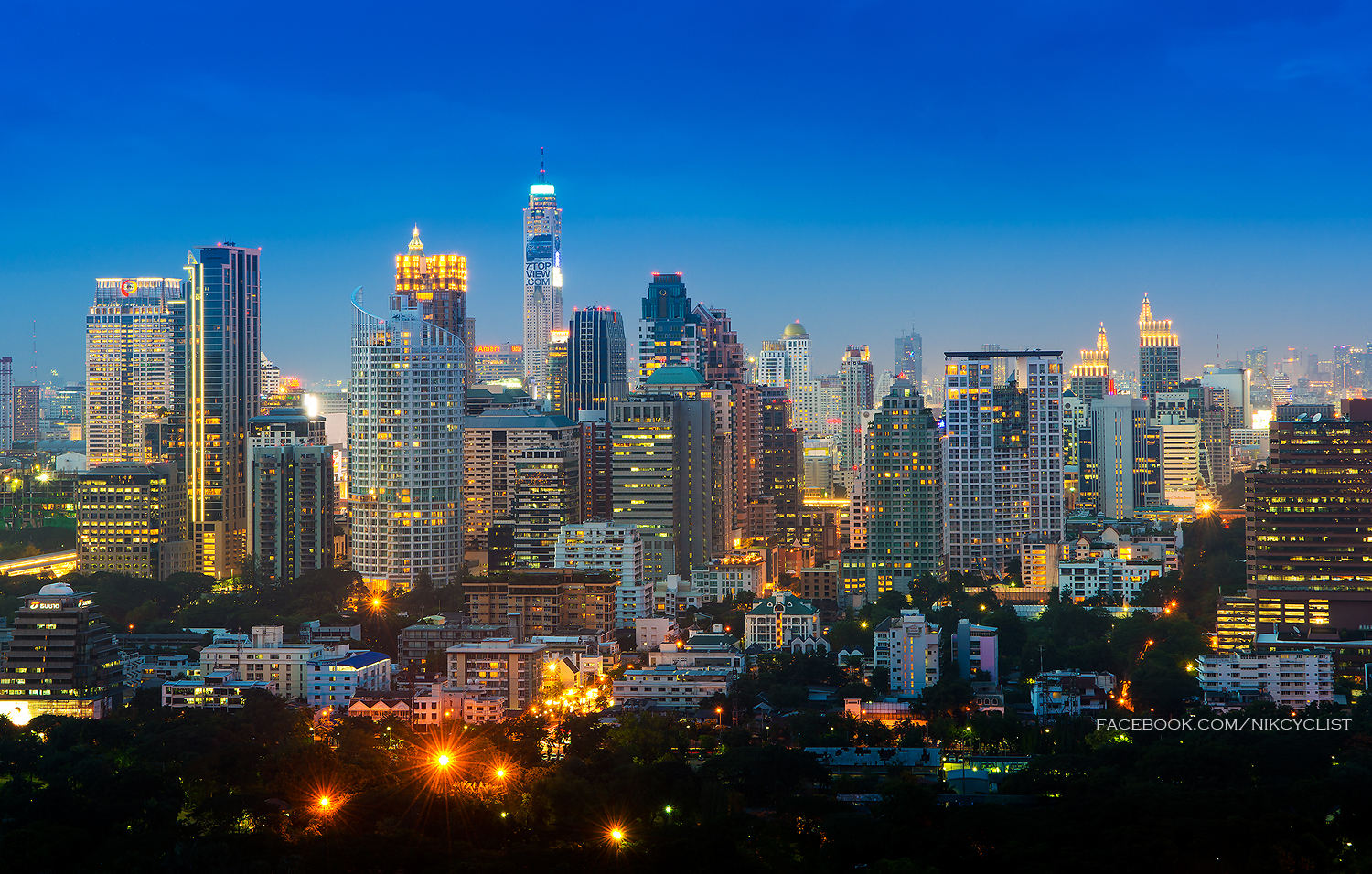
The skyscrapers and high-rises of Ratchadamri, together with those of adjacent Lang Suan Road, seen from across Lumphini Park
