= Dusit International =

Thai multinational hospitality company

- Type: Public
- Traded as: SET: DUSIT
- ISIN: TH0007A10Z06
- Industry: Hospitality
- Founded: 1948
- Founder: Thanpuying Chanut Piyaoui
- Headquarters: Bangkok, Thailand
- Number of locations: 57
- Key people: Suphajee Suthumpun, Group Chief Executive Officer
- Services: Dusit Thani College; Le Cordon Bleu; Devarana Spa
- Revenue: ▲5,570 million baht (2017)
- Net income: ▲332 million baht (2017)
- Number of employees: ▼3,703
- Divisions: Dusit Thani; Dusit Devarana; Dusit Suites; Dusit Princess dusitD2; Dusit Collection; ASAI Hotels; Elite Havens; Dusit Hotels
- Website: www.dusit-international.com

Dusit Thani Public Company Limited (Thai: บริษัท ดุสิตธานี จำกัด (มหาชน)), branded as Dusit International (Thai: ดุสิต อินเตอร์เนชั่นแนล), is a Thai multinational hospitality company headquartered in Bangkok. Dusit International has 57 hotels and resorts and approximately 240 villas in 18 countries. Founded by Thanpuying Chanut Piyaoui in 1948, the company is now led by Chanin Donavanik.

== Financials ==
Dusit International's FY2017 revenues were 5,570 million baht, up from 2016's 5,425 million. Net profits in FY2017 doubled from 2016: from 152 million baht to 332 million. Total assets rose to 9,978 million baht. Total liabilities rose to 4,098 million baht.

The top seven Dusit International executives' remuneration in FY2016 was 57.13 million baht in salary and benefits, up from 32.51 million baht paid to eight executives in 2015.

Dusit Thani PCL has been listed on the Stock Exchange of Thailand (SET) since 1975. Its shares are not actively traded.

== History ==
The group's origin dates back to 1948 when Thanpuying Chanut Piyaoui opened her first hotel, the "Princess", in Bangkok. It had only 30 rooms but had the distinction of being the first modern hotel in Bangkok with a swimming pool.

The company takes its name and much of its character from the ideas of King Rama VI, whose thoughts on the modern state blended Western and Thai influences. In 1918, he created a utopian miniature city near Lumpini Park and named it Dusit Thani meaning "town in heaven". In Thai, Dusit is the mythological name for the fourth of the seven levels of heaven.

In 1970, the 23 storey Dusit Thani Bangkok became the company's first flagship hotel. The 510-room hotel was the first luxury hotel and the tallest building in Bangkok for several years.

In 1987, Dusit acquired its first resort property, Dusit Thani Pattaya, followed by another beach resort in Phuket Province, the Dusit Thani Laguna Phuket. In 1989, Dusit Thani Hua Hin, formerly known as the Dusit Resort and Polo Club, opened. Royal Princess Chiang Mai was opened in Chiang Mai in 1991, followed by the Dusit Island Resort Chiang Rai.

In 1995, Dusit International acquired the Hotel Nikko Manila by purchasing shares in the holding company, Philippine Hoteliers, Inc. (PHI), from Japan Airlines Development Company Limited and JAL Trading Inc. After the acquisition, the Hotel Nikko Manila came under the management of Dusit Thani Hotels and Resorts, and was renamed the Dusit Hotel Nikko, Manila. The Manila hotel underwent a major renovation programme and became Dusit Thani Manila in April 2008. It is known for the Supreme Court ruling on "Illegal Strike" which considered the shaving of heads by the employees of Dusit Hotel as tantamount to committing strike. The issue has been protested widely in the Philippines especially with the International Labour Organization's findings that the Philippine government and the Supreme Court violated the workers' right to freedom of expression and association and redefined the meaning of strike.

In November 2006, Dusit Thani added a brand extension, the Dusit Lifestyle Collection with dusitD2 hotels and resorts. dusitD2 is the second generation brand of Dusit Thani Hotels and Resorts. The first property in the dusitD2 collection opened in November 2006 in Chiang Mai. The second dusitD2 hotel, dusitD2 Baraquda Pattaya, was opened in February 2009.

Dusit International's portfolio includes Dusit Princess Hotels and Resorts. The rebirth of the original Princess hotel came with the 1989 opening of the Royal Princess Larn Luang, Bangkok. There are seven Dusit Princess properties in Thailand. The first Dusit Princess outside Thailand, Dusit Princess City Centre, Dubai, opened in December 2009.

Dusit Thani Dongtai was the first Dusit Thani to launch in China. Dusit Thani Fudu Qingfeng and dusitD2 Fudu Binhu Hotel also opened in 2016 followed by Dusit Thani Dongtai.

The group's other business are hotel management of both Thai and overseas properties, and education, through the Dusit Thani College and a Bangkok culinary school joint venture with Le Cordon Bleu of France. In 1993, Thanpuying Chanut founded Dusit Thani College. In 2009 it initiated a programme with Lyceum of the Philippines University. Additionally, the college opened its new campus in Pattaya in 2011.

In August 2007, the Le Cordon Bleu Dusit Culinary School opened, making it the first of its kind in the Southeast Asian region.

Besides these, The Dusit Executive Development Center (DEDC) was established in 2005 as a subsidiary of Dusit Thani Public Co., Ltd. to provide executive training and development courses to individuals and various organisations.

The dusitD2 Hotel in Nairobi was the scene of the 2019 Nairobi hotel attack.

In April 2018, Dusit International introduced a new mid-market brand called ASAI Hotels. In August 2025, Dusit Hotels brand was launched, with three properties already operating under Dusit in Doha, Hanoi, and Chengdu.

== Dusit Central Park ==
In 2017 it was announced that the Dusit Thani Hotel would be demolished in April 2018. That date has been postponed for eight months: final checkout at the hotel will be at 14:00, 5 January 2019. The rebuilt hotel will open as part of a 36.7 billion baht mixed-use project to be built in partnership with Central Pattana PLC. When an entirely new Dusit Thani reopens its doors after a three-four year construction period, it will be taller but with fewer rooms – about 300 compared with the current 510.

== Hotel brands ==
Dusit International operates over 300 properties in 19 countries, comprising hotels, resorts, and luxury villas under eight distinct brands, including Dusit Thani, Dusit Princess, dusitD2, Dusit Devarana, and ASAI Hotels.

Hotel/Resort	Dusit Brand	Location	Country	Ref(s)	Image
dusitD2 City Centre, Bahrain	dusitD2	Manama	Bahrain		
Yarkay Thimphu, Bhutan	dusitD2	Thimphu	Bhutan		
dusitD2 Fudu Binhu Hotel	dusitD2	Changzhou	China		
Dusit Thani Fudu Qingfeng Garden	Dusit Thani	Changzhou	China		
Dusit Thani Wujin	Dusit Thani	Changzhou	China		
Dusit Thani Dongtai	Dusit Thani	Dongtai	China		
Dusit Devarana Hot Springs & Spa Conghua	Dusit Devarana	Guangzhou	China		
dusitD2 Society Hill, Tianjin	dusitD2	Tianjin	China		
Heritage Villas Zhouzhuang	Dusit	Zhouzhuang	China		
Dusit Thani LakeView Cairo	Dusit Thani	Cairo	Egypt		
Dusit Princess Kuta, Bali	Dusit Princess	Bali	Indonesia		
dusitD2 Nairobi	dusitD2	Nairobi	Kenya		
Dusit Thani Maldives	Dusit Thani	Baa Atoll	Maldives		
Dusit Princess Kathmandu	Dusit Princess	Kathmandu	Nepal		
Dusit Thani Mactan Cebu	Dusit Thani	Cebu	Philippines		
dusitD2 Jebel Akhdar	dusitD2	Saiq	Oman		
Dusit Thani Manila	Dusit Thani	Makati, Manila	Philippines		
dusitD2 The Fort, Manila	dusitD2	Taguig, Manila	Philippines		
Dusit Thani Residences Davao	Dusit Thani	Davao	Philippines		
dusitD2 Davao	dusitD2	Davao	Philippines		
The Beach Club at Lubi Plantation Island	Dusit	Davao	Philippines		
Dusit Doha Hotel	Dusit	Doha	Qatar		
dusitD2 Salwa	dusitD2	Doha	Qatar		
Dusit Thani Laguna Singapore	Dusit Thani	11 Laguna Golf Green	Singapore		
Dusit Suites Hotel Ratchadamri	Dusit	Bangkok	Thailand		
Dusit Thani Bangkok (The original building was demolished to make way for the construction of Dusit Central Park complex, a new hotel of the same name is built within this complex)	Dusit Thani	Bangkok	Thailand		
Dusit Princess Srinakarin	Dusit Princess	Bang Na, Bangkok	Thailand		
Pathumwan Princess MBK Centre	Dusit Princess	Bangkok	Thailand		
Royal Princess Larn Luang	Dusit Princess	Bangkok	Thailand		
ASAI Chinatown, Bangkok	ASAI	Bangkok	Thailand		
ASAI Sathorn, Bangkok	ASAI	Bangkok	Thailand		
dusitD2 Chiang Mai	dusitD2	Chiang Mai	Thailand		
Dusit Princess Chiang Mai	Dusit Princess	Chiang Mai	Thailand		
Dusit Thani Hua Hin	Dusit Thani	Cha-am	Thailand		
dusitD2 Khao Yai	dusitD2	Nakhon Ratchasima	Thailand		
Dusit Thani Krabi Beach Resort	Dusit Thani	Krabi Province	Thailand		
dusitD2 Ao Nang, Krabi	dusitD2	Krabi Province	Thailand		
Dusit Thani Pattaya	Dusit Thani	Pattaya	Thailand		
Dusit Thani Laguna Phuket	Dusit Thani	Phuket	Thailand		
Dusit Thani Abu Dhabi	Dusit Thani	Abu Dhabi	United Arab Emirates		
Dusit Thani Dubai	Dusit Thani	Dubai	United Arab Emirates		
Dusit Princess Residence Dubai Marina	Dusit Princess	Dubai	United Arab Emirates		
dusitD2 Kenz Hotel	dusitD2	Dubai	United Arab Emirates		
Dusit Thani Guam Resort	Dusit Thani	Guam	United States		
Dusit Princess Moonrise Beach Resort	Dusit Princess	Phu Quoc	Vietnam		
Dusit Princess Rijas	Dusit Princess	Dubai	United Arab Emirates		
Dusit Suites Athens	Dusit Suites	Athens	Greece		
Dusit Thani Kyoto	Dusit Thani	Kyoto	Japan		
Dusit Thani Resort & Spa Anapa Miracleon	Dusit Thani	Anapa	Russia		
