= Sala Daeng =

Road intersection in Bangkok, Thailand

Coordinates: 13°43′46″N 100°32′11″E

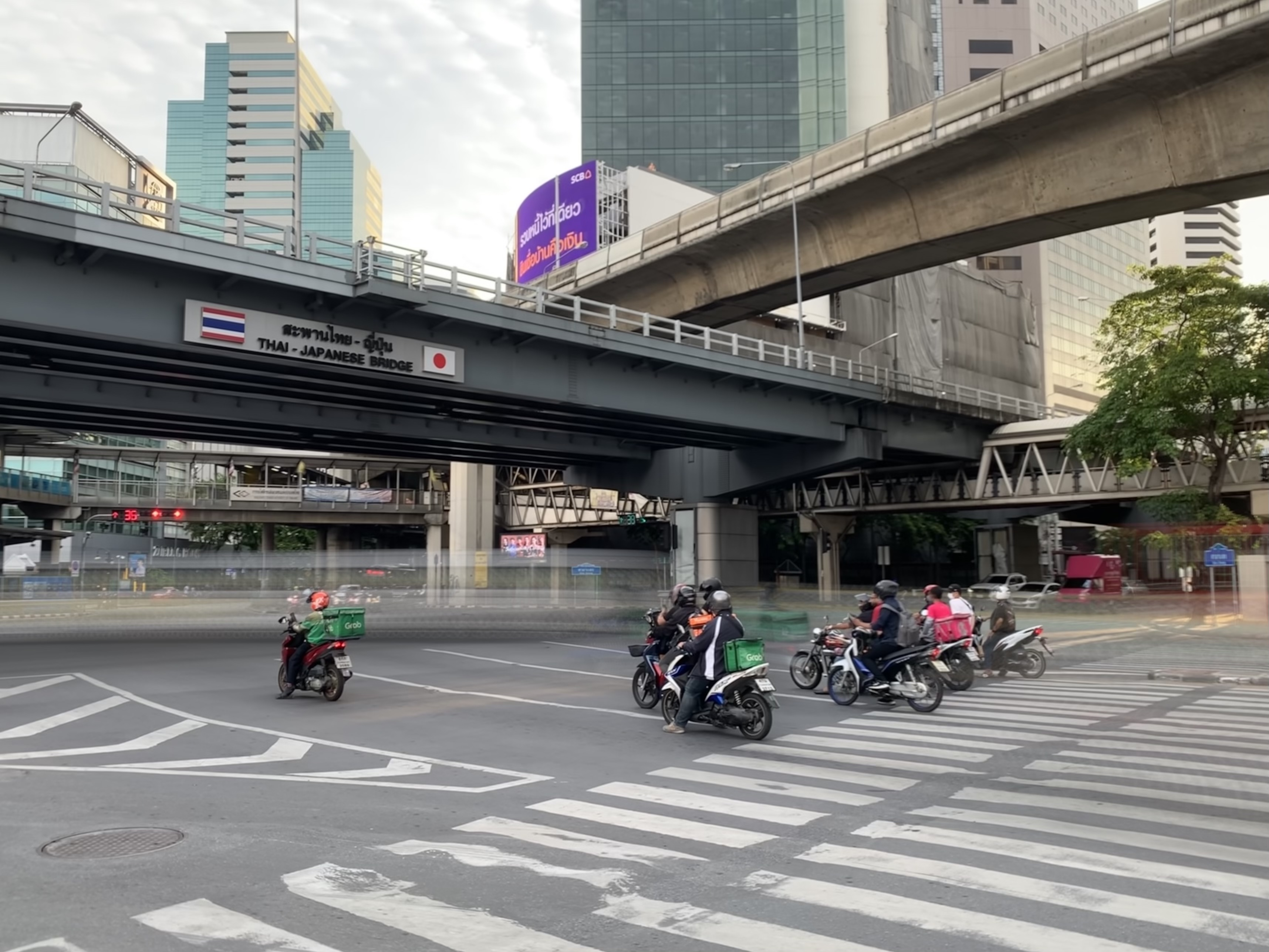
Sala Daeng Intersection, with the Thai–Japanese bridge and the BTS Skytrain above

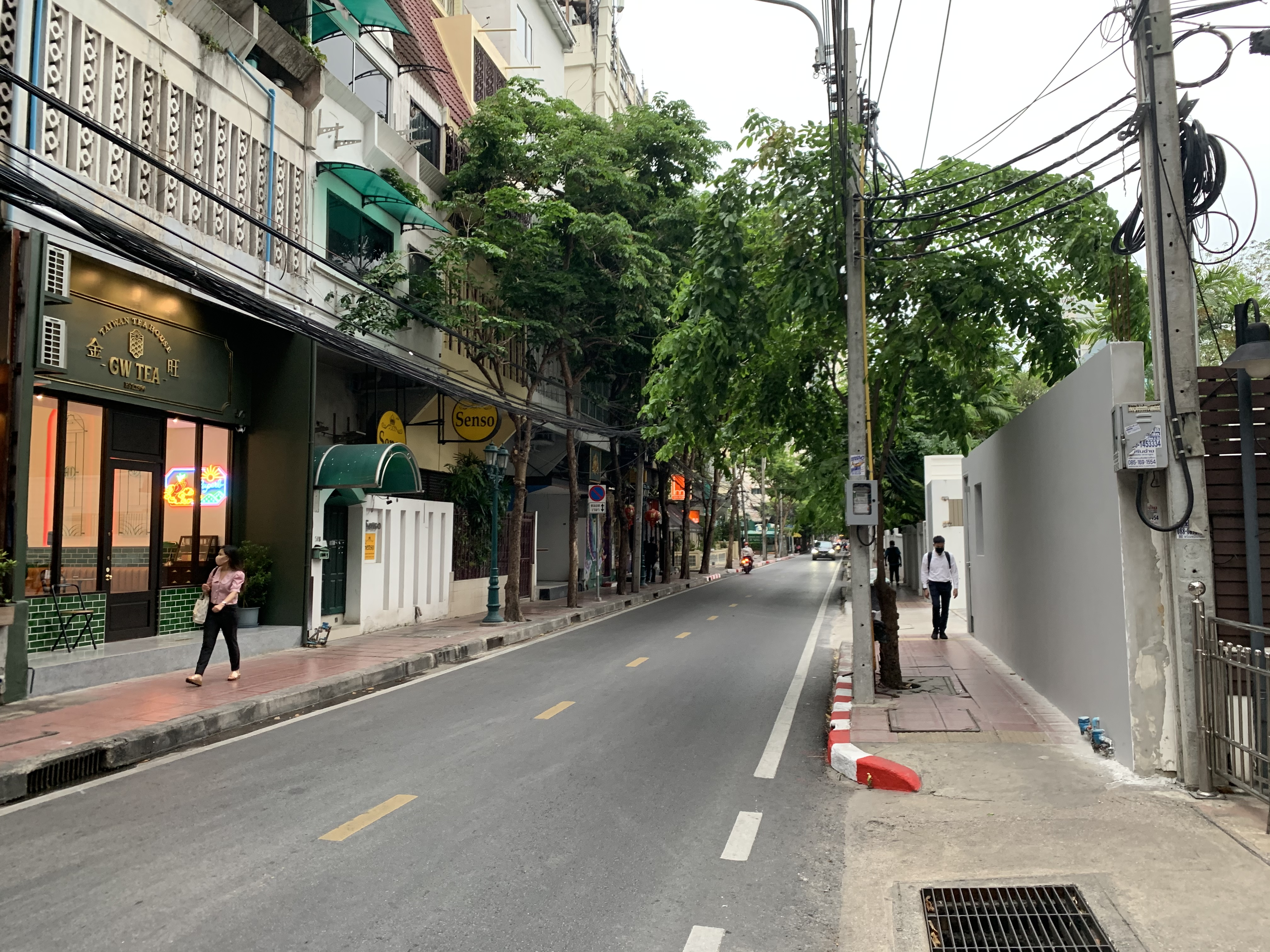
Sala Daeng Road, 2021

Sala Daeng (Thai: ศาลาแดง, pronounced [sǎːlāː dɛ̄ːŋ]) is the name of the intersection and neighbourhood at the beginning of Si Lom Road in Bangkok, Thailand. It is located within Pathum Wan District, next to its border with Bang Rak, where Si Lom meets Rama IV and Ratchadamri Roads. The Thai–Japan Flyover Bridge, constructed in 1992, passes over Sala Daeng intersection, as well as the westward Henri Dunant and Sam Yan intersections, along Rama IV Road. A small street, known as Sala Daeng Road, branches off Si Lom Road (near the intersection) and connects to the parallel Sathon Road.

The intersection area is served by the Sala Daeng station of the BTS skytrain's Silom Line and the Si Lom station of the underground MRT's Blue Line, forming one of the systems' first interchanges and a gateway into the main business district of Si Lom Road, which begins here. On the corners of the intersection are Dusit Central Park (where the old Dusit Thani Hotel once stood), King Chulalongkorn Memorial Hospital, Lumphini Park and Silom Edge.

== History ==
In the nineteenth century, the area consisted of paddy fields far from the city centre. When the Paknam Railway was built around 1893, linking Bangkok to Samut Prakan, a station was built in the area, at what is now approximately in front of King Chulalongkorn Memorial Hospital. The station building was painted red, leading it to be called Sala Daeng, which means "red pavilion". The field thus became known after the station as Thung Sala Daeng (ทุ่งศาลาแดง lit. 'Sala Daeng field'). King Vajiravudh (Rama VI) later bought the land in the area and developed it as Lumphini Park. Subsequent development led to the area becoming part of Bangkok's busiest commercial centres, and Sala Daeng Intersection has been known as one of the busiest in the city. It was once used as a place of the Royal Ploughing Ceremony as well.
