= Sala Daeng BTS station =

Railway station in Bangkok, Thailand

Sala Daeng ศาลาแดง
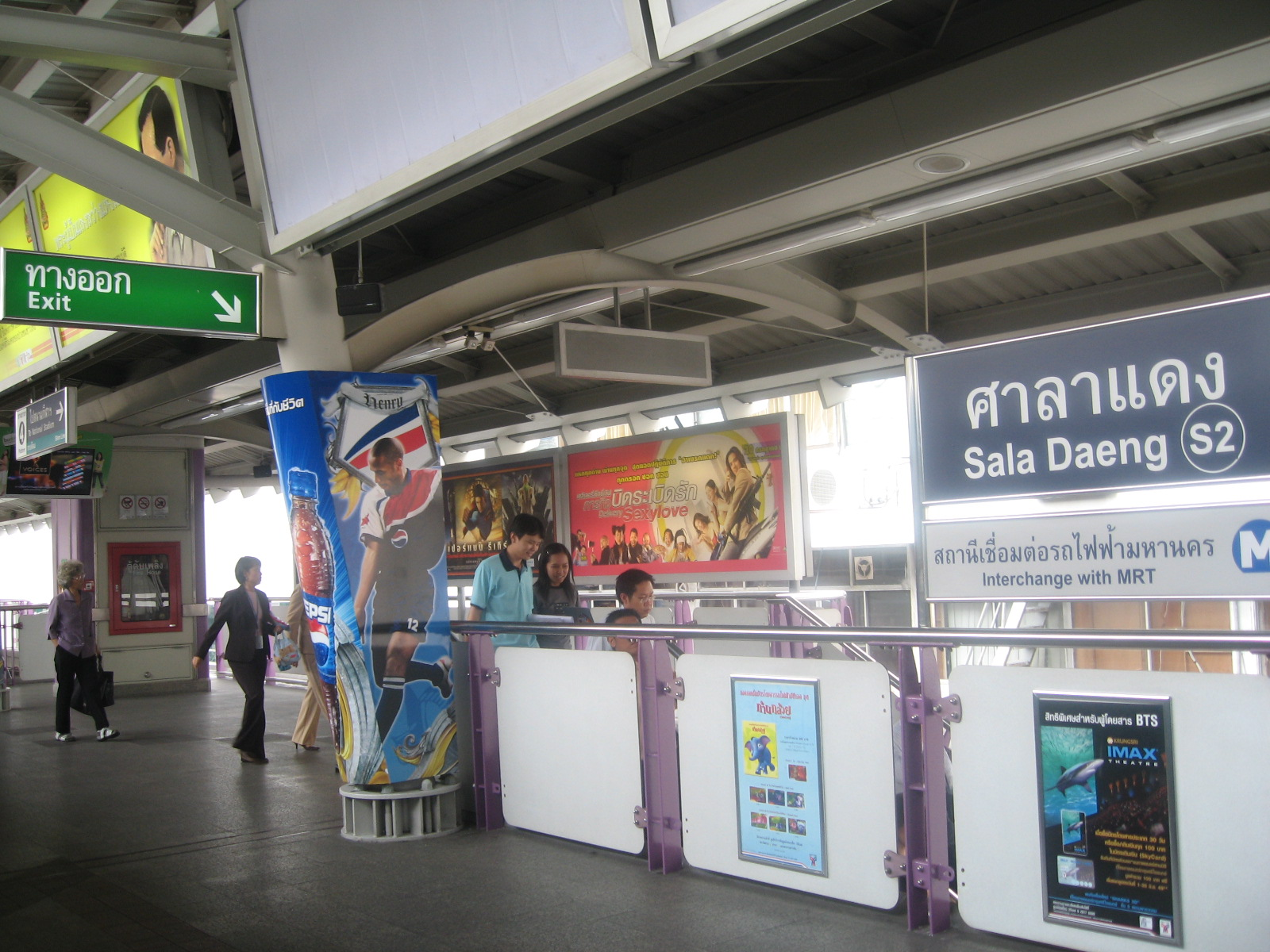

General information
- Location: Bang Rak; Bangkok; Thailand
- Coordinates: 13°43′42.63″N 100°32′2.88″E
- Owner: Bangkok Metropolitan Administration (BMA); BTS Rail Mass Transit Growth Infrastructure Fund (BTSGIF)
- Operator: Bangkok Mass Transit System; Public Company Limited (BTSC)
- Line: Silom Line
- Connections: Blue Line (Si Lom)

Construction
- Structure type: Elevated

Other information
- Station code: S2

History
- Opened: 5 December 1999; 26 years ago

Passengers
- 2021: 3,043,054

Services
Preceding station	BTS Skytrain	Following station
Ratchadamri towards National Stadium	Silom Line	Chong Nonsi towards Bang Wa
Preceding station	Metropolitan Rapid Transit	Following station
Sam Yan towards Lak Song	Blue Line transfer at Si Lom	Lumphini towards Tha Phra
Location

Sala Daeng station (Thai: สถานีศาลาแดง, pronounced [sā.tʰǎː.nīː sǎː.lāː dɛ̄ːŋ]) is a BTS Skytrain station, on the Silom line in Bang Rak District, Bangkok, Thailand. The station is located on Si Lom Road to the southwest of Sala Daeng Intersection. It is surrounded by financial center along Si Lom Road with towers and skyscrapers, and also entertainment area of Patpong and Thaniya. There is a sky walk connecting the station to Si Lom MRT station of the Blue Line. The same skywalk also connects to Sala Dang intersection and King Chulalongkorn Memorial Hospital.

== Station layout ==
U3; Platform	Side platform, doors will open on the left
U3; Platform	Platform 4	Silom Line toward National Stadium (Ratchadamri)
U3; Platform	Platform 3	Silom Line toward Bang Wa (Chong Nonsi)
U3; Platform	Side platform, doors will open on the left
U2 ticket sales class	ticket sales floor	Exit 1–5, Passenger Service Center; Ticket Office, Ticket Machine, Shop; Connection to Si Lom station (MRT Blue Line)
G Street level	-	Bus Stop; Sala Daeng Intersection, King Chulalongkorn Memorial Hospital

== See also ==
- BTS Skytrain
