= Dusit (name) =

Dusit (ดุสิต) is a Thai given name. Notable people with the name include:

- Dusit Chalermsan (born 1970), Thai football player and coach
- Dusit Niyato, Singapore-based computer engineer
