= Dusit Thani College =

Private institute in Bangkok, Thailand

Coordinates: 13.6988°N 100.6489°E

- วิทยาลัยดุสิตธานี
- Motto: Success through wisdom
- Type: Private
- Established: 1993
- Rector: Ms. Frouke Gerbens
- Location: Bangkok, Thailand
- Website: www.dtc.ac.th/en/

Dusit Thani College (DTC) (Thai: วิทยาลัยดุสิตธานี) is a private institute in Bangkok, Thailand, specializing in hospitality and culinary arts management. It operates under Dusit International, a Thai-based hospitality group. Established over 40 years ago, the college has since expanded its programs internationally.

The college offers academic programs that combine theoretical instruction—delivered by faculty with professional experience in the hospitality and tourism industries—with practical training. Students also gain work experience through internships and training in real workplace settings, supported by dedicated facilities and equipment for hospitality and culinary education.

== History ==
In 1993 Dusit Thani College was established as 'The Dusit Thani Hotel School', an addition to the Dusit Thani Group, which owns and operates hotels and resorts. The college is adjacent to one of the group's hotels.

At that time, Thailand had a shortage of manpower, knowledge and experience in the hospitality industry, due in part to a lack of educational institutes and training programmes. Those that existed focused only on theory, offering no practical experience for the students. In addition, there were few industry leaders involved in the academic development of hotel businesses.

Dusit Thani Hotel School was established to meet this need by delivering specialised, practical training for the industry and to support Thailand's developing hotel business.

At first, two courses were available:

- Diploma in Hotel Operations
- Professional Chef Diploma

Dusit Thani Hotel School became the first institute in Thailand to be approved for college status and started to offer undergraduate programs.

== Programs ==
Dusit Thani College offer undergraduate and postgraduate level.

Undergraduate Thai Program: 3 bachelor's degree programs:

- Hotel Management
- Service Innovation in Tourism Industry
- Culinary Arts and Restaurant Management

Undergraduate International Program: 2 bachelor's degree programs:

- Hotel and Resort Management, academic certification by École hôtelière de Lausanne
- Professional Culinary Arts, a jointly degree between Le Cordon Bleu And Dusit Thani College

Postgraduate Thai Program : 2 master's degree program:

- Master of Business Administration (Hospitality Business Management)
- Master of Business Administration (Innovative Entrepreneur)

== Campuses ==
Currently, There are 2 campuses.

- Dusit Thani College, Bangkok Campus
- Dusit Thani College, Pattaya City Center
