= Dusit Thani Bangkok =

Hotel in Bangkok, Thailand

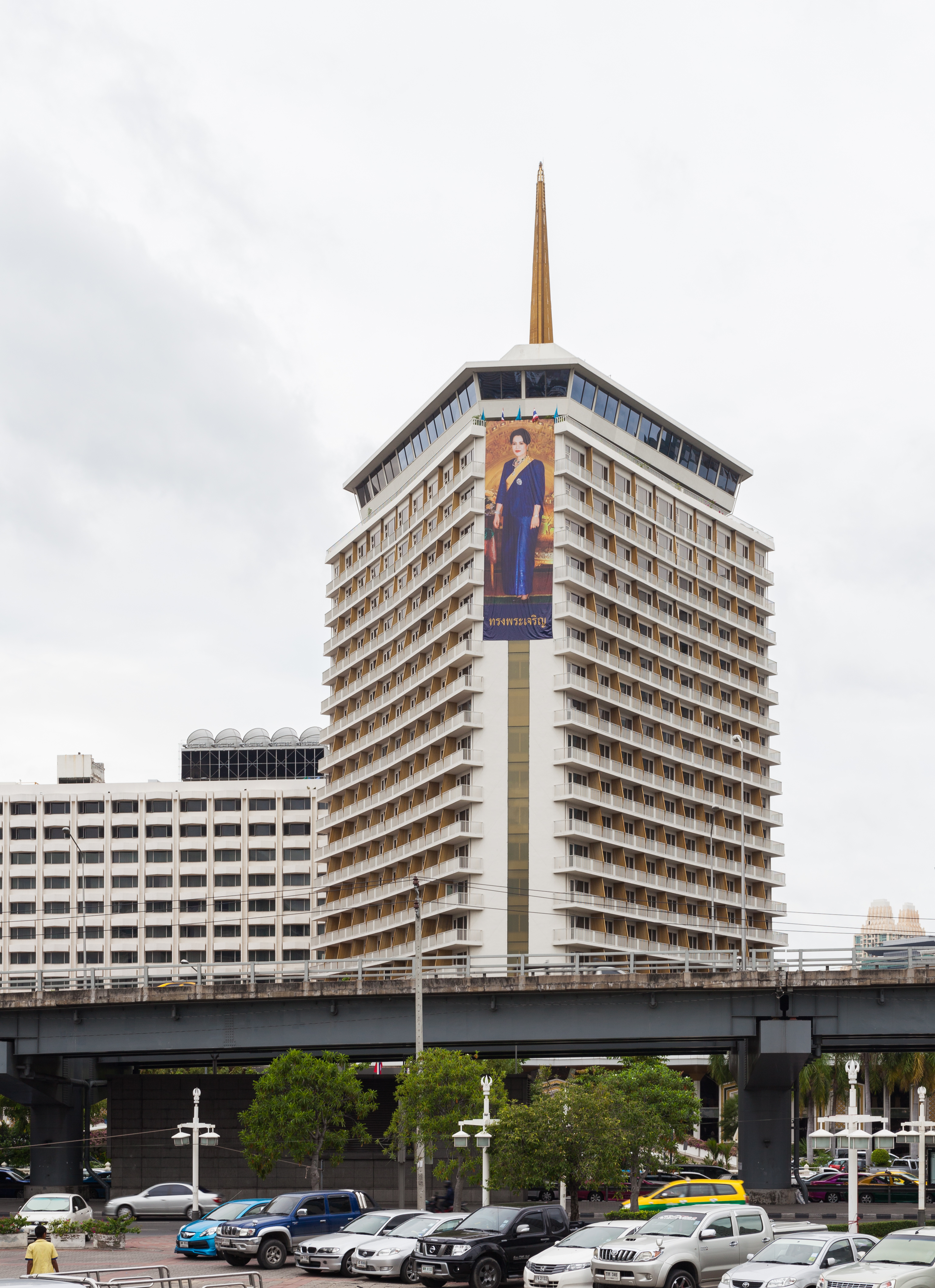
- The former hotel building in 2013
- Interactive map of the Dusit Thani Bangkok area
- Hotel chain: Dusit International

General information
- Status: Demolished (original)
- Type: Hotel
- Location: 946 Rama IV Rd, Silom, Bang Rak, Bangkok 10500, Thailand
- Coordinates: 13°43′42″N 100°32′14″E
- Opening: February 27, 1970; 56 years ago
- Closed: January 5, 2019; 7 years ago (original)
- Demolished: 2019–2020 (original)
- Owner: Thanpuying Chanut Piyaoui

Technical details
- Floor count: 23

Design and construction
- Architect: Yozo Shibata
- Main contractor: Thai Obayashi
- Known for: Longest operating international chain hotel in the Thailand, First 5-star hotel in Bangkok

Other information
- Number of rooms: 517
- Number of restaurants: 2
- Number of bars: 2

The Dusit Thani Bangkok, often referred to simply as the Dusit Thani Hotel (Thai: โรงแรมดุสิตธานี), is a luxury hotel in the Thai capital's Bang Rak District. The original hotel building was the country's tallest building when it opened in 1970 as the first property of Dusit International. Work on demolishing the building started in 2019 and ended in 2020. The hotel re-opened on the site on September 27, 2024 as part of the Dusit Central Park complex.

== History ==
The Dusit Thani hotel was founded by hotelier Thanphuying Chanut Piyaoui. It was her second hotel after the Princess Hotel on Charoen Krung Road, which opened in 1948 and expanded as Bangkok's hospitality industry grew during the Cold War period. Thanphuying Chanut conceived the Dusit Thani as an internationally recognised luxury hotel to compete with the Siam Inter-Continental Hotel, which had opened in 1966. On a visit to the Hotel Okura in Tokyo, she became impressed with the hotel's design, and enlisted Japanese architect Yozo Shibata, who had worked on the design team for the Okura, to design her new hotel. Construction was supervised by Tokyo-based C. Itoh, while Thai Obayashi served as the main contractor. The name Dusit Thani was borrowed from King Rama VI's miniature city project which experimented with democracy during the 1920s.

The Dusit Thani stood on the former location of Ban Saladaeng, the former residence of the Chaophraya Yommarat (Pan Sukhum), on the southeast corner of Sala Daeng Intersection, the beginning of Si Lom Road. Thanphuying Chanut secured a lease from the Crown Property Bureau, which owns the land. The hotel opened on 27 February 1970, initially managed by Western International Hotels, becoming one of Bangkok's first five-star hotels. The building, 23 storeys high with a triangular cross-section, was topped with a distinctive golden spire; it was the tallest building in the city upon its completion, at 82 metres (269 ft) (or 100 m (330 ft) including the spire). The building's design featured Modernist influences as well as traditional Thai motifs such as the prachamyam patterns decorating its facade.

When it opened, the Dusit Thani introduced many novelties to Bangkok's social scene, including a discotheque, ballrooms, and a restaurant on the top floor. The hotel brands itself as emphasising Thainess, from its decor to the conduct of the staff. It is the oldest property of the Dusit Thani Company, whose business has since expanded internationally to include dozens of hotels. By the 2010s, the hotel featured 517 guest rooms, and its list of guests included Gwyneth Paltrow, Whitney Houston, Ronald Reagan and Tom Jones.

In March 2017, the company, in partnership with real estate developer Central Pattana, renewed its lease with the Crown Property Bureau for 30 years (with an extension option of an additional 30 years). It announced plans to redevelop the property as a mixed-use project, titled Dusit Central Park and worth 36.7 billion baht ($1.1bn), which would include residences, retail areas and office space, in addition to a new hotel. The hotel remained open until 5 January 2019, after which it closed for redevelopment. Meanwhile, the company has partnered with Silpakorn University to document, archive, and preserve some of the original hotel's artistic and architectural elements.

The 1970 structure was demolished, and a new mixed-use tower called Dusit Central Park was built on the site. It contains a new 257-room Dusit Thani Bangkok Hotel, opened on September 27, 2024.

== Gallery ==
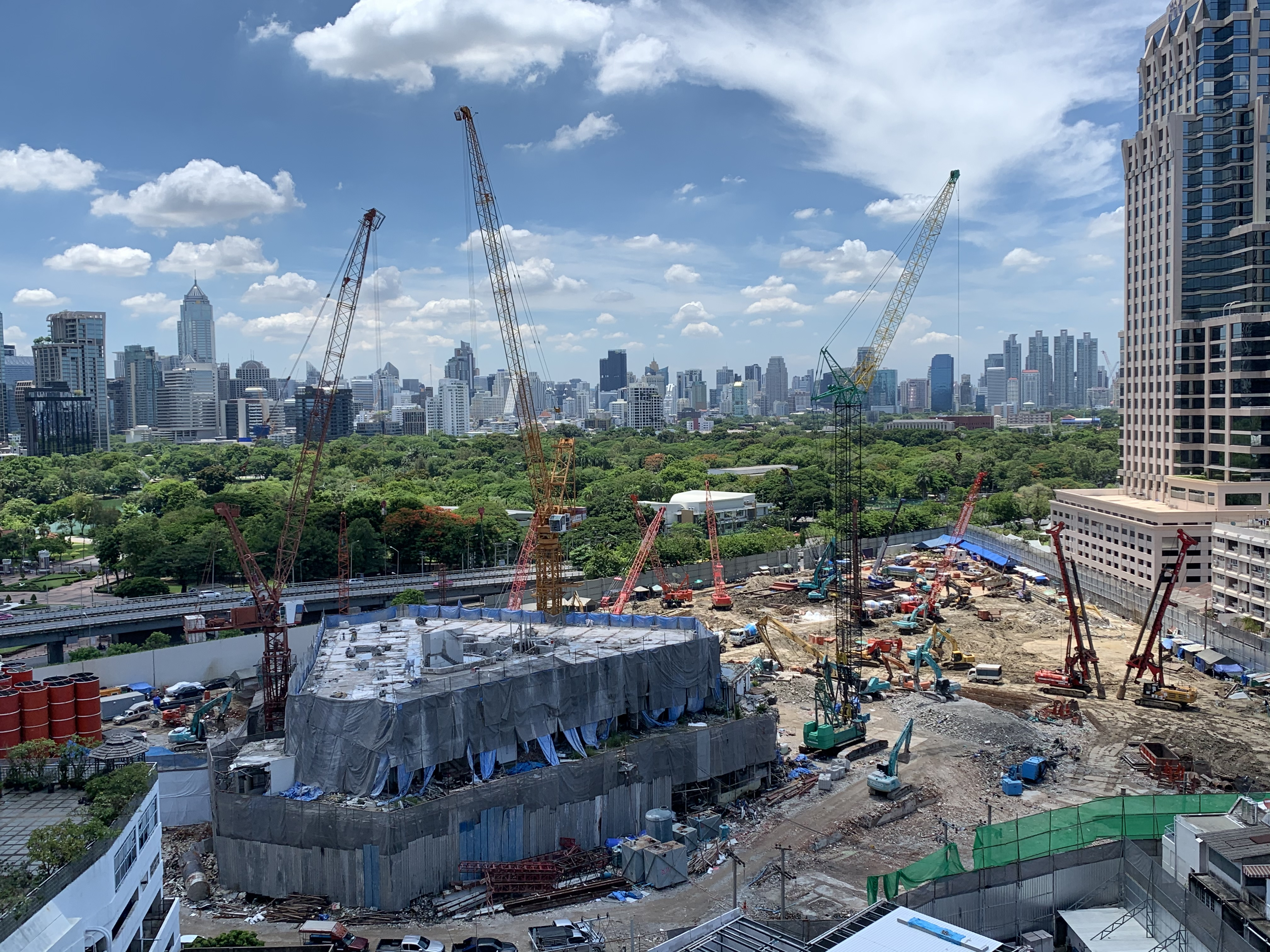
The building amid demolition as of June 2020

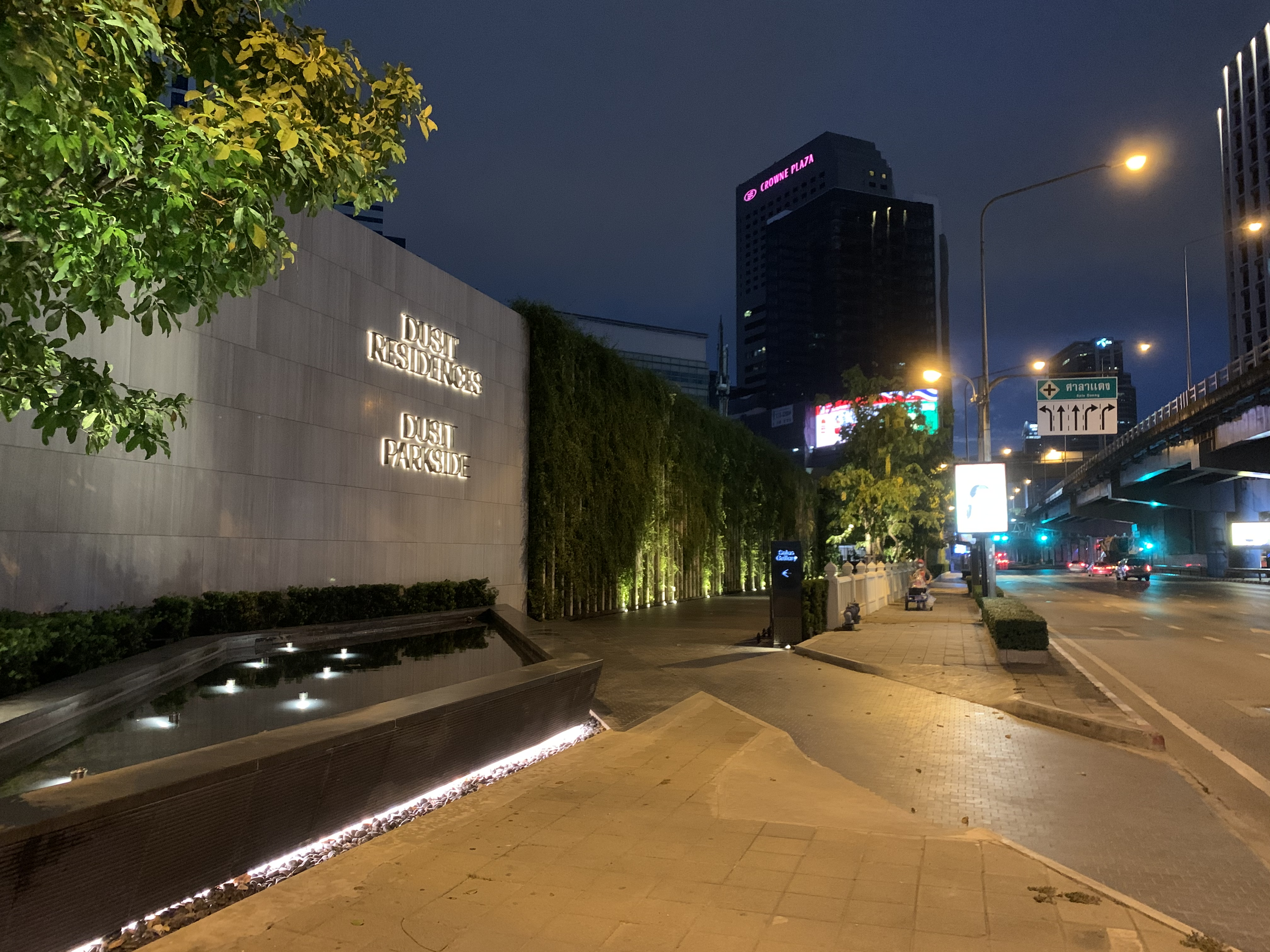
Outside of the construction site for the new Dusit Central Park complex, as of 2021
