= Si Lom Road =

Road in Bangkok

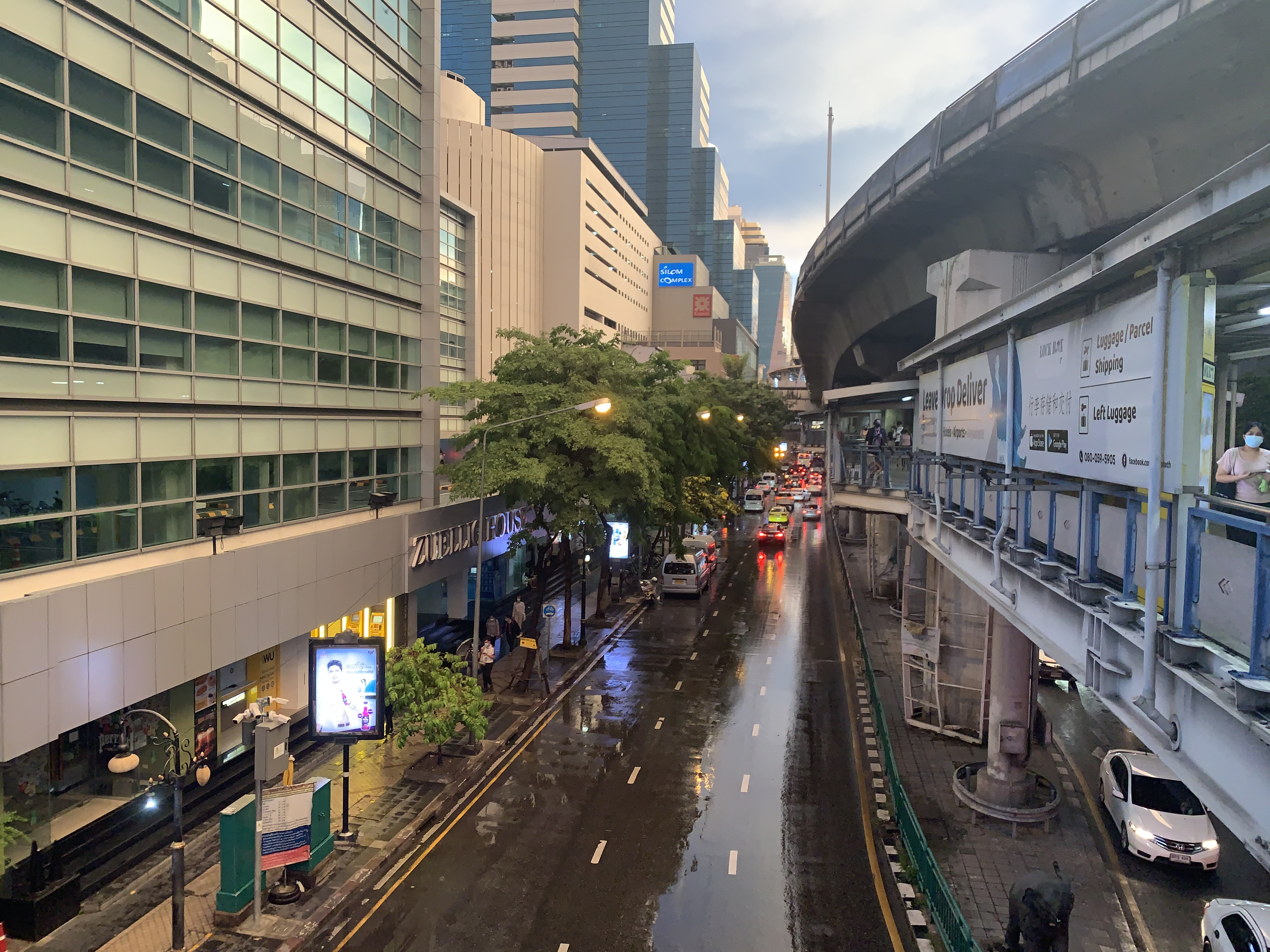
Si Lom Road in 2021

Si Lom Road (also written as Silom, Thai: สีลม, pronounced [sǐː lōm]) is a major street in Bangkok, Thailand. The road is best known for its commercial neighbourhood, which, along with the nearby and roughly parallel Sathon Road, forms one of the city's main business districts. It runs in a southwest–northeast direction between Charoen Krung and Rama IV roads in the city's Bang Rak District, forming the boundary between Suriyawong Subdistrict to its north and Si Lom Subdistrict to its south. Si Lom was one of the earliest modern roads to be built in the city, and some of its side streets serve historic ethnic neighbourhoods from the late nineteenth century, while others are known as shopping and nightlife venues.

While BTS Skytrain's Silom Line is named after the road, only one station is actually located on the road, Sala Daeng. This station interchanges with Si Lom Station of the MRT Blue Line.

== History ==
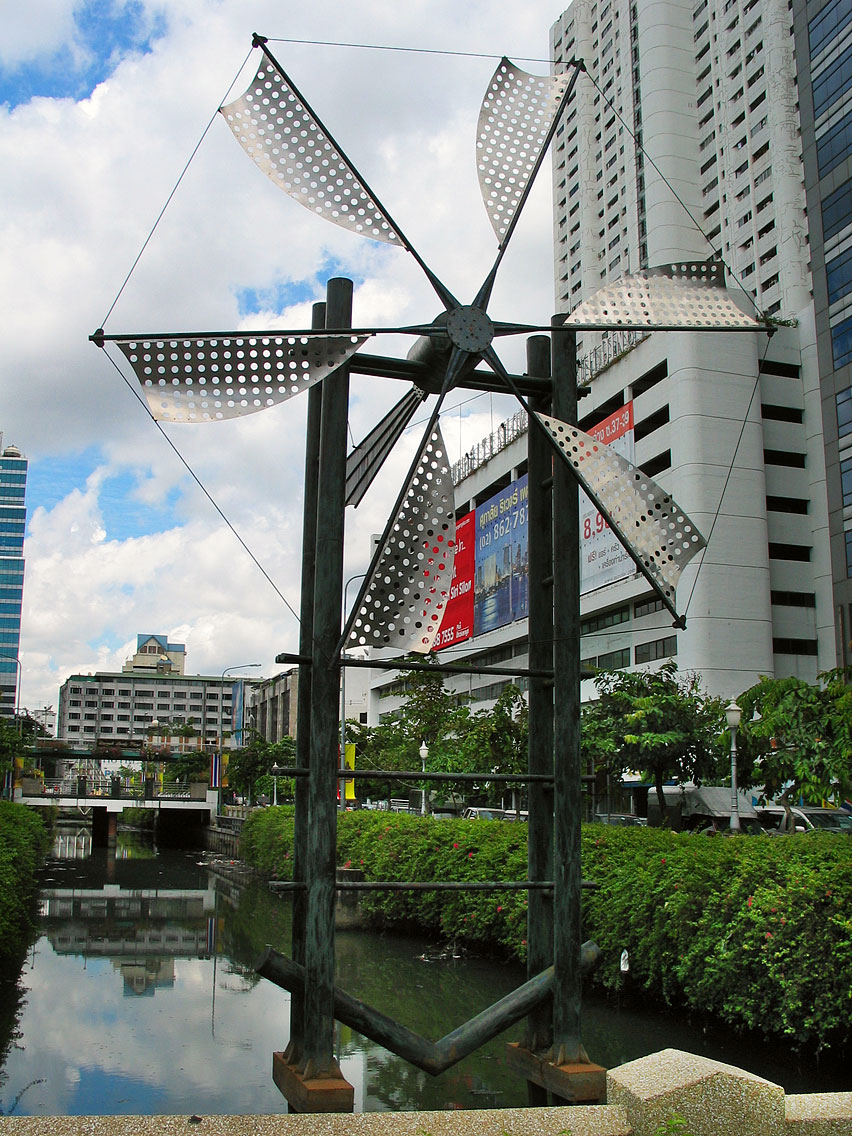
The windmill memorial at Silom–Naradhiwas Intersection commemorates the origins of the road's name.

In the reign of King Mongkut (Rama IV, 1851–1868), Siam (as Thailand was then known) began modernizing and opening up to the West. Major roads were first built in Bangkok, with Thanon Trong (what is now Rama IV Road) built together with a canal in 1857, followed by Charoen Krung Road (popularly considered the first modern road in the country) in 1862, both in response to requests by Western consuls and merchants. Around the same time, the King had a canal dug from the French Consulate to the canal of Thanon Trong, linking the latter to the Chao Phraya River via the existing Bang Rak Canal. The dredged earth was used to build a road, running alongside the canal on its southern bank and linking Charoen Krung and Trong roads. The King also solicited contributions from wealthy property owners, who helped build bridges over canals crossed by the road.

The new canal and road were initially known as Khlong Khwang and Thanon Khwang ('crossing canal'/'crossing road'). They later became known as Si Lom, which literally translates as windmill, probably from a windmill erected in the area by a Western entrepreneur; the road was referred to as Windmill Road in English-language sources until the 1930s.

Areas along the road initially developed agriculturally, attracting a variety of ethnic communities. In the 1890s and 1900s, enterprising developers built roads and canals parallel to Si Lom (Sathon Road to the south, and Surawong and Si Phraya to the north), and the area that is now Bang Rak District became served by a network of roads, attracting businesses as well as wealthy residents. Religious institutions were established along the road, serving Western expatriates as well as settlers from Western colonies. A tram line running alone the road began operation in 1925. The area gradually saw increasing development, which sharply accelerated in the 1960s. In 1963, the trams were discontinued and the canal filled in for the road's expansion, further incentivizing its development as a business street. The Dusit Thani Hotel, the city's first high-rise building, opened at the road's Rama IV end in 1970, and a wave of high-rise construction followed, especially from the 1980s to early 1990s as Bangkok underwent rapid economic growth which ended with the 1997 financial crisis. The BTS Skytrain, opened in 1999, now runs above the eastern half of the road's length, and Si Lom and Sathon continue to be known as one of the main business districts of Bangkok.

== Neighbourhoods ==
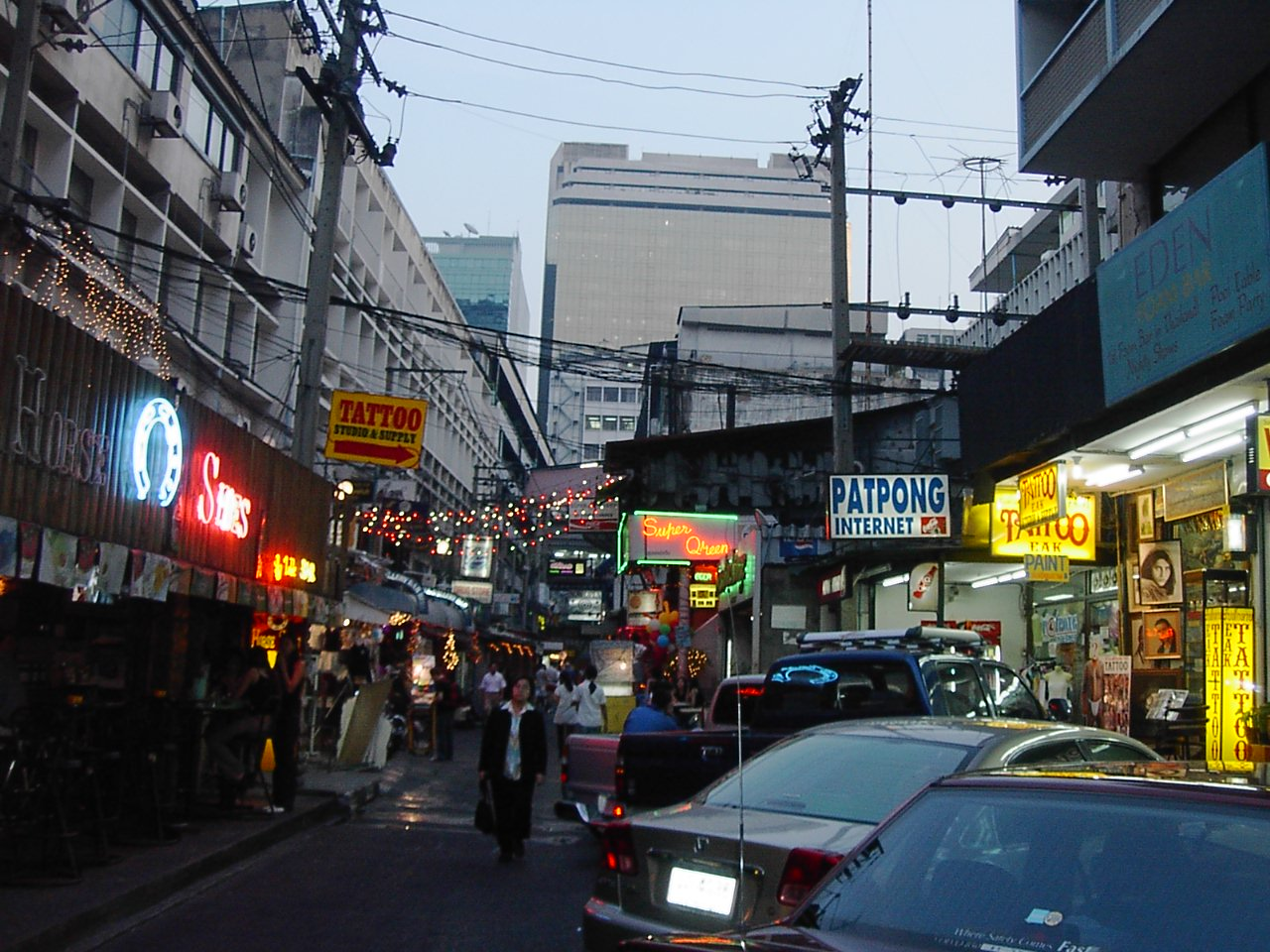
Patpong is well known as a red-light district catering to foreigners.

Si Lom Road runs from Sala Daeng Intersection at its eastern end—where it meets Rama IV and Ratchadamri roads—west and slightly south to Bang Rak Junction, where it meets Charoen Krung Road. Around mid-way, it is crossed by Naradhiwas Rajanagarindra Road, a major thoroughfare which leads southeast to Sathon and onwards. Most of the road is fronted by commercial establishments, with its eastern half in particular lined by towering office blocks and luxury hotels, while several distinctive neighbourhoods are nestled along its side streets (soi).

On the road's north side (in Suriyawong Subdistrict), some of the even-numbered soi, as well as a few named streets, link it to Surawong. Near the Sala Daeng end, the streets serve a concentration of nightlife venues, and blend into the tourist-oriented red-light district of Patpong, while Thaniya Road (ธนิยะ, also spelled Taniya) is known as a hub of Japanese establishments. On the opposite side, Sala Daeng and Convent roads link to Sathon, and are home to restaurants and cafes, as well as Saint Joseph Convent School and the Carmelite Monastery. Nearby odd-numbered soi include Soi 5 or Soi Lalai Sap, a popular shopping street.

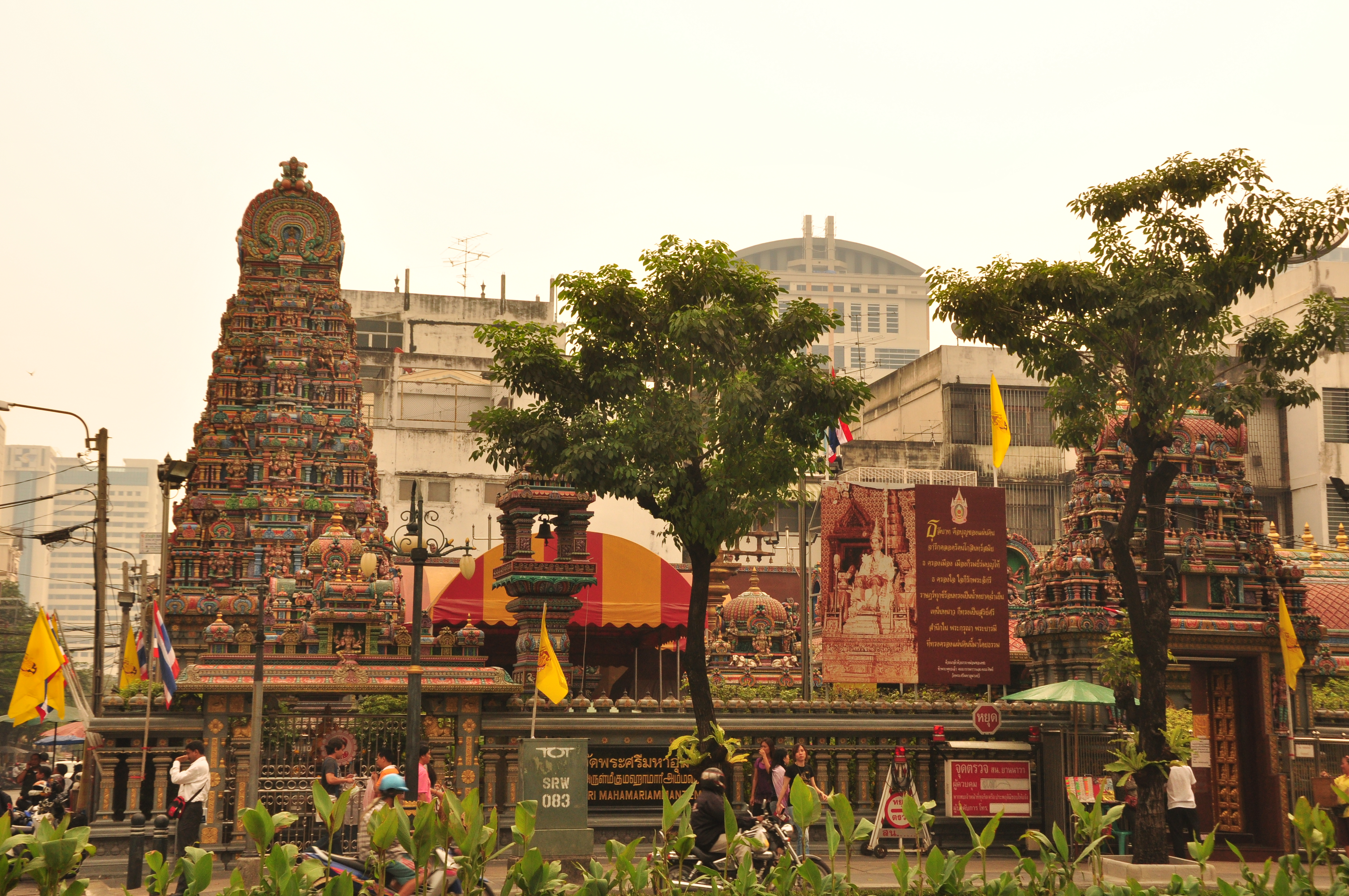
Sri Mahamariamman Temple is a major landmark on Si Lom Road

Past Si Lom–Naradhiwas intersection, the road becomes quieter, and a few old ethnic cemeteries remain on its southern side, especially along Soi 9. Towards Bang Rak Junction to the west, the neighbourhood is home to a significant Tamil Indian community, and the Hindu Sri Mahamariamman Temple, whose Navaratri celebrations are a major annual event on Si Lom, forms major landmark here. The temple sits on the corner of Pan Road (ถนนปั้น), which links to Sathon and is also known as Soi Wat Khaek (ซอยวัดแขก 'Indian temple street') after the temple. The street is officially named after Pan Vajrabhaya (ปั้น วัชราภัย; RTGS: Pan Watcharaphai), who was the wife of Luang Uppakankosakon (หลวงอุปการโกษากร) and provided the land for its construction. On the road are vendors selling modak, shops selling offerings for Ganesh, restaurants, cafés, bars and galleries. The area around Mahesak Road (between Si Lom and Surawong) is also known as a jewellery district.

On the corner of Bang Rak Junction, the gigantic State Tower building towers over the neighbourhood and the next-door Lerdsin Hospital. (Bangkok Christian Hospital is another major hospital on the street.) Other significant buildings include the nearby Jewelry Trade Center, and King Power Mahanakhon on Naradhiwas Rajanagarindra Road. The 1981 headquarters building of Bangkok Bank is iconic for its pioneering application of modernist design to a concrete high-rise building, while other major corporations based on Si Lom include Thailand's largest conglomerate Charoen Pokphand and other financial institutions, leading Si Lom to be known as the "Wall Street of Thailand". The areas along Si Lom command some of the highest land prices in the country, with official appraisals for 2016–2020 ranging from 700,000 to 1,000,000 baht per square wa (US$6,000–8,000 per square metre, 600–700/sq ft).

== Rapid transit ==
While BTS Skytrain's Silom Line is named after the road, only one station is actually located on the road, Sala Daeng. This station interchanges with Si Lom Station of the MRT Blue Line. Silom Line has another station which is located close to the road, Chong Nonsi BTS station.
