= Khlong Toei subdistrict =

Khlong Toei คลองเตย
- Khwaeng
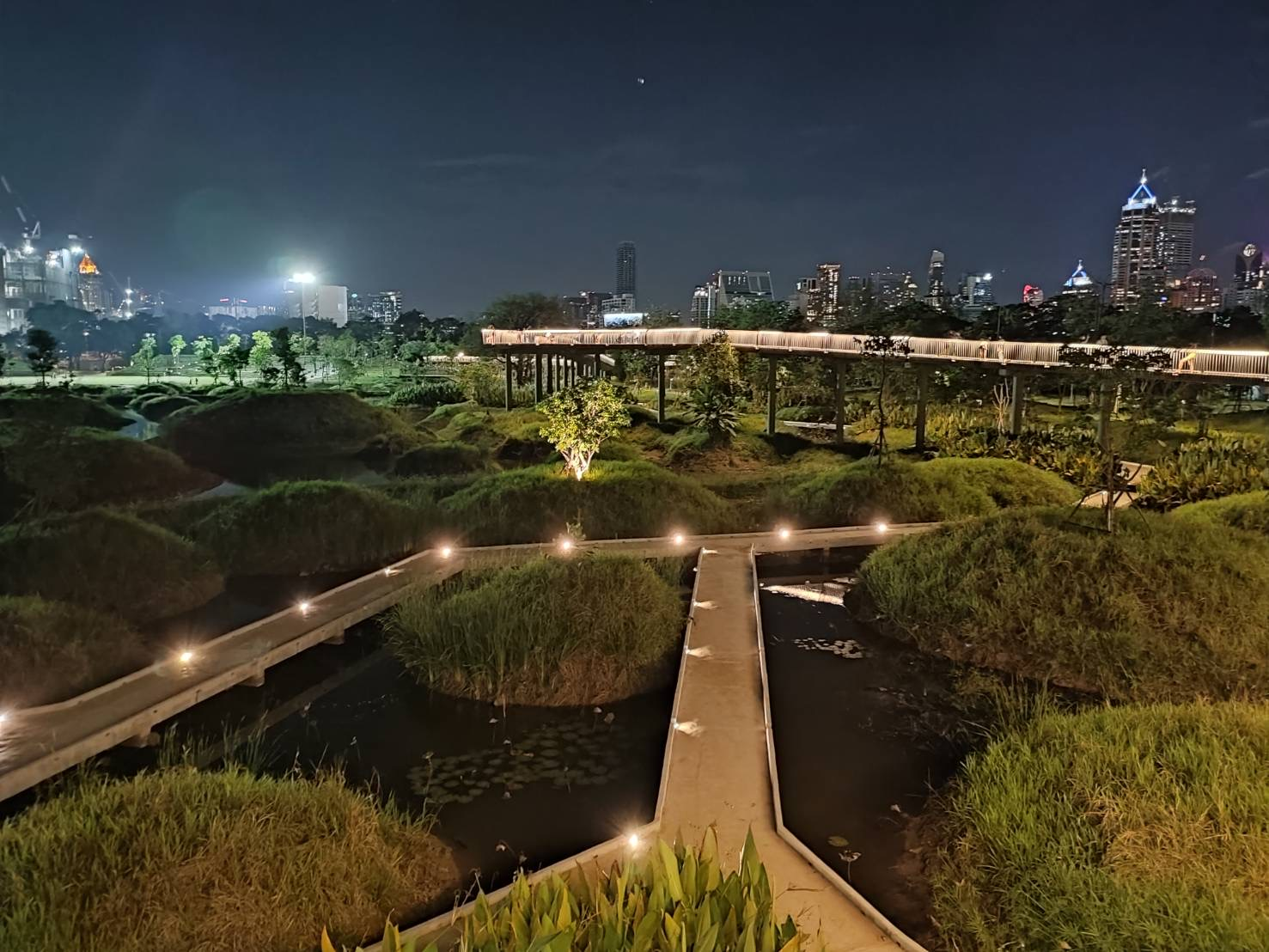
- Benjakitti Park
- Etymology: Canal of Pandans
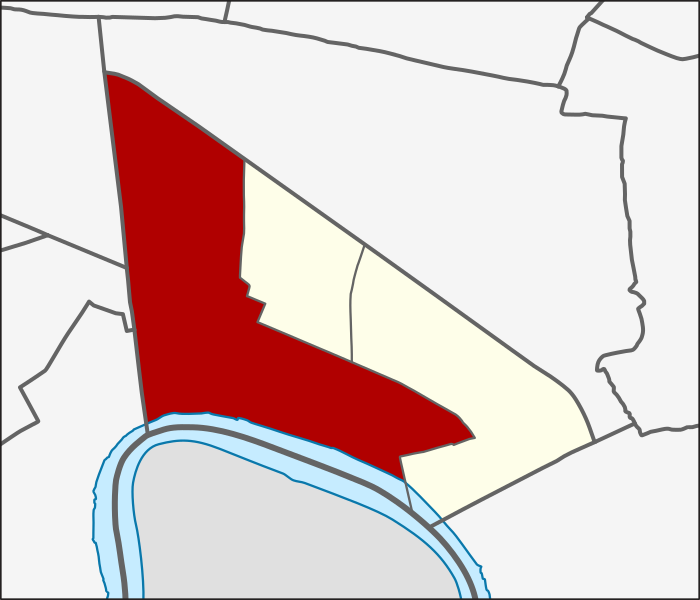
- Location in Khlong Toei district
- Country: Thailand
- Province: Bangkok
- Khet: Khlong Toei

Area
  - Total: 7.249 km^{2} (2.799 sq mi)

Population (2022)
  - Total: 58,712
  - Density: 8,099.32/km^{2} (20,977.1/sq mi)
- Time zone: UTC+7 (ICT)
- Postal code: 10110
- TIS 1099: 103301

Khlong Toei (Thai: คลองเตย, pronounced [kʰlɔ̄ːŋ tɤ̄ːj]) is a khwaeng (subdistrict) of Khlong Toei district, Bangkok.

== History ==
Khlong Toei was once the outpost of Phra Pradaeng, which was across the river Chao Phraya in the early Ayutthaya period. Present-day Phra Pradaeng district, Samut Prakan province.

The area's name means "Canal of Pandans", referring to the fragrant foliages used to grow along the waterways here. The canal Khlong Toei was considered part of Khlong Hua Lamphong otherwise known as Khlong Thanon Trong that flows from the Hua Lamphong railway station area. They have now been filled in as an extension of Rama IV road since the early 1960s.

Throughout the decades, Khlong Toei has evolved from a land of plantations into residential area and financial heart of the capital. It is here that Bangkok's main port is situated. It's also home to largest shantytown, the slum of Khlong Toei.

== Geography ==
Khlong Toei is located to the west of the district. It is hemmed by other places (from the north clockwise): Khlong Toei Nuea in Watthana district, Khlong Tan and Phra Khanong in its district, (across the Chao Phraya river) Bang Ko Bua and Bang Kachao in Phra Pradaeng district of Samut Prakan province, Chong Nonsi in Yan Nawa district, Thung Maha Mek in Sathon district, and Lumphini in Pathum Wan district.
