= Queen Sirikit National Convention Centre MRT station =

Mass Rapid Transit station in Thailand

Coordinates: 13.7231°N 100.5600°E

ศูนย์การประชุมแห่งชาติสิริกิติ์ Queen Sirikit National Convention Centre
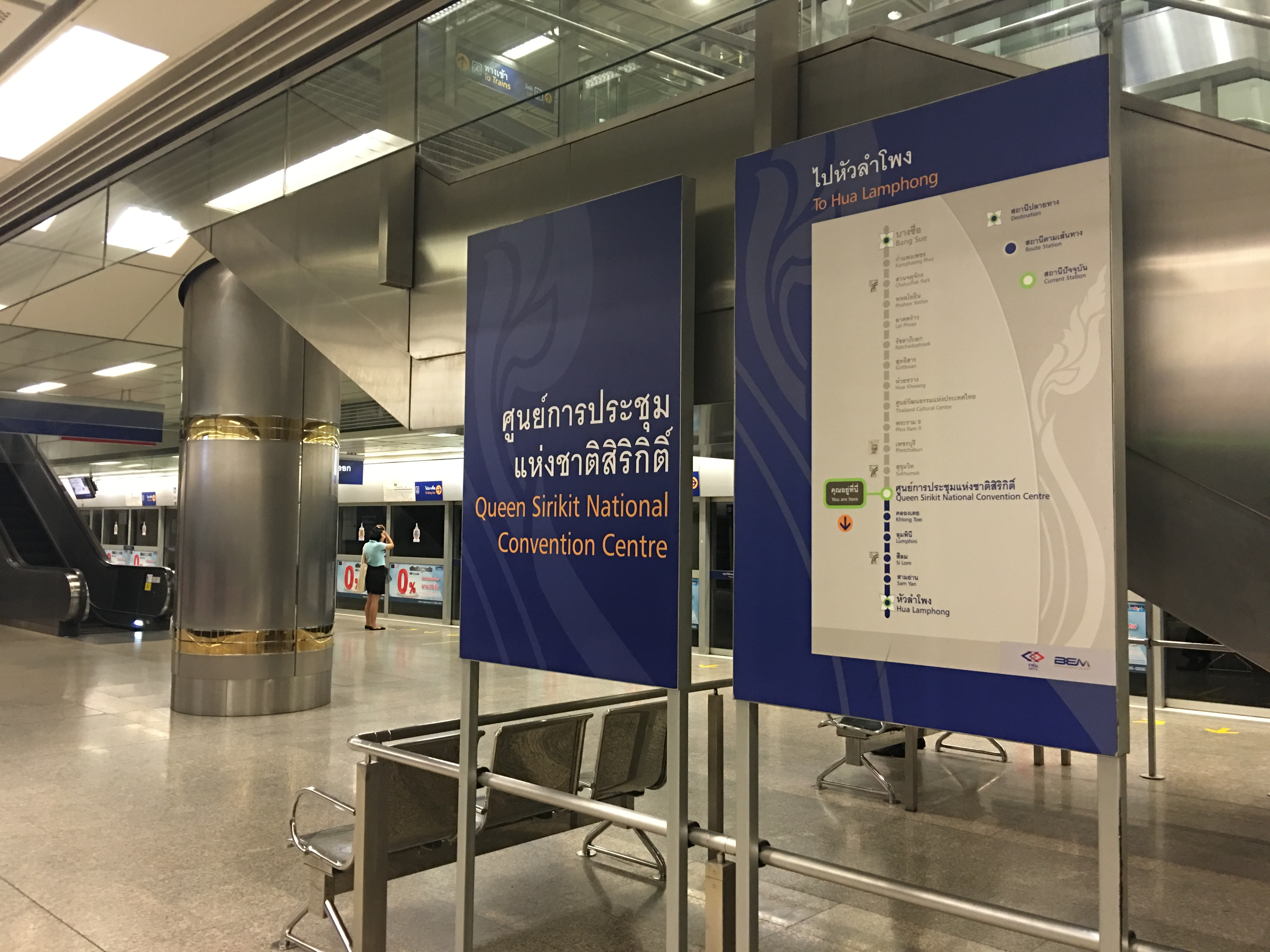

General information
- Location: Khlong Toei, Bangkok, Thailand
- System: MRT
- Owner: Mass Rapid Transit Authority of Thailand (MRTA)
- Operator: Bangkok Expressway and Metro Public Company Limited (BEM)
- Line: MRT MRT Blue Line
- Platforms: 1 island platform
- Tracks: 2

Construction
- Structure type: Underground
- Accessible: yes

Other information
- Station code: BL23

History
- Opened: 3 July 2004; 22 years ago

Passengers
- 2021: 2,615,726

Services
Preceding station	Metropolitan Rapid Transit	Following station
Khlong Toei towards Lak Song	Blue Line	Sukhumvit towards Tha Phra via Bang Sue
Location

Queen Sirikit National Convention Centre MRT station (Thai: สถานีศูนย์การประชุมแห่งชาติสิริกิติ์, RTGS: Sathani Sun Kanprachum Haeng Chat Sirikit, code BL23) or QSNCC station is a Bangkok MRT station on the Blue Line, in Bangkok, Thailand. Located under Ratchadaphisek Road, near Queen Sirikit National Convention Centre, Benjakitti Park, PAT Stadium and Khlong Toei Market.

== Station details ==
Use symbol as Queen Sirikit National Convention Centre's buildings and colour is yellow. It is an underground station, width 23 metres (75 ft), length 196 metres (643 ft), depth 20 metres (66 ft), and uses an island platform.

There is a MetroMall in the station.

== Station layout ==
G	Street level	Bus stop, Queen Sirikit National Convention Centre, Stock Exchange of Thailand, Benchakitti Park
B1; Basement	Underground walkway	Exit 1-4
B2; Concourse	Concourse	Ticket machines
B3; Platform	Platform 2	Blue towards Tha Phra via Bang Sue (Sukhumvit)
B3; Platform	Island platform, doors will open on the right
B3; Platform	Platform 1	Blue towards Lak Song (Khlong Toei)

== History ==
On 16 October 2026, it was temporarily closed from 09:00 to 16:00 as part of security measures implemented for the 2026 International Monetary Fund–World Bank Group Annual Meetings held at Queen Sirikit National Convention Centre.
