= Khlong Toei MRT station =

MRT station

Coordinates: 13.7224°N 100.5540°E

คลองเตย Khlong Toei
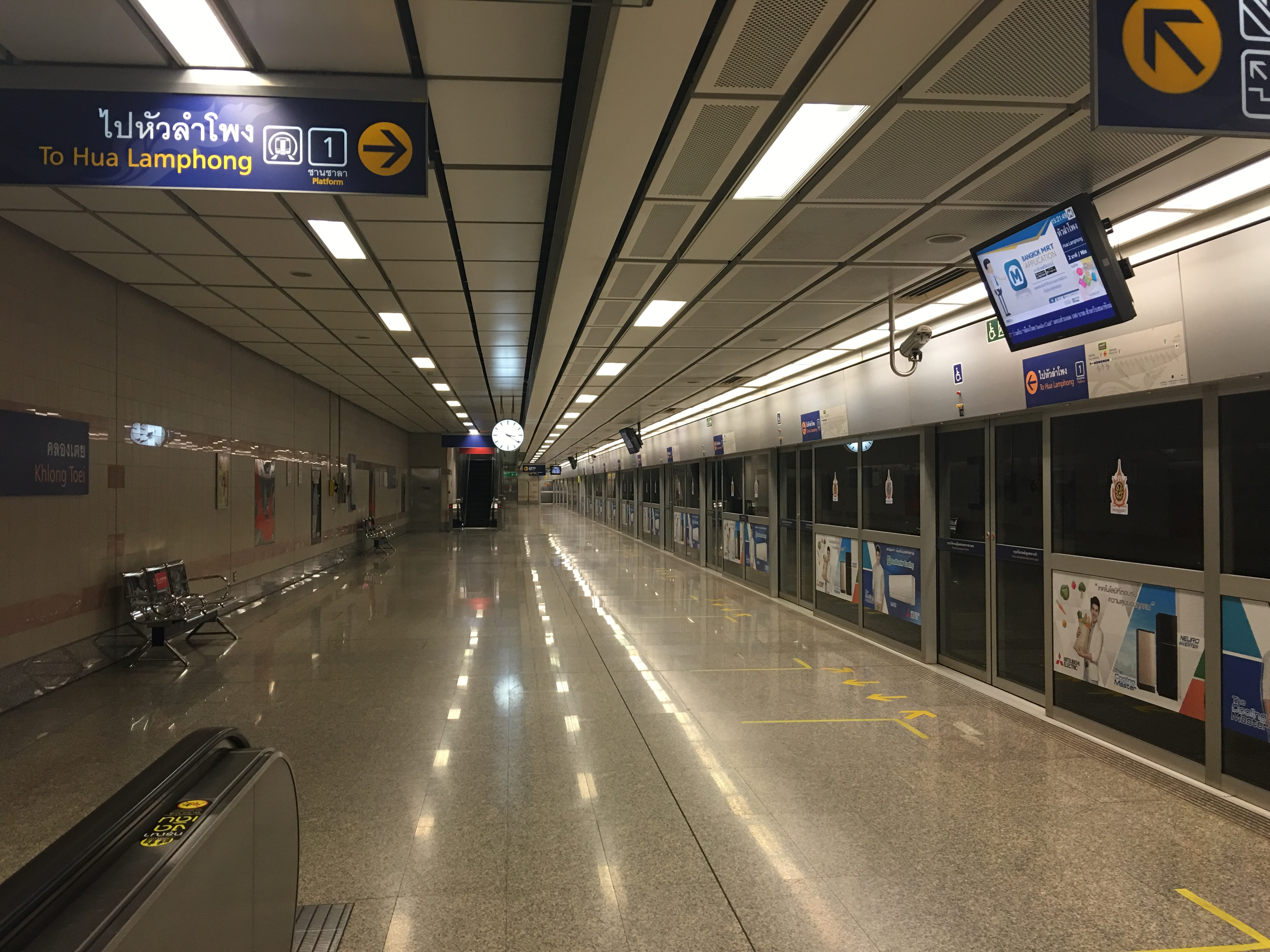

General information
- Location: Rama IV Road, Khlong Toei, Bangkok, Thailand
- System: MRT
- Owner: Mass Rapid Transit Authority of Thailand (MRTA)
- Operator: Bangkok Expressway and Metro Public Company Limited (BEM)
- Line: MRT MRT Blue Line
- Platforms: 2 side platforms
- Tracks: 2

Construction
- Structure type: Underground
- Accessible: yes

Other information
- Station code: BL24

History
- Opened: 3 July 2004; 22 years ago
- Former names: Bon Kai

Passengers
- 2021: 764,958

Services
Preceding station	Metropolitan Rapid Transit	Following station
Lumphini towards Lak Song	Blue Line	QSNCC towards Tha Phra via Bang Sue
Location

Khlong Toei MRT station (Thai: สถานีคลองเตย, pronounced [sā.tʰǎː.nīː kʰlɔ̄ːŋ tɤ̄ːj]; code BL24) is a Bangkok MRT station on the Blue Line. Located under Rama IV Road, near Metropolitan Electricity Authority Headquarters and Chaloem Maha Nakhon Expressway in Khlong Toei District, Bangkok, Thailand.

Construction of the MRT began at this station nine months after the foundation stone was laid by King Maha Vajiralongkorn (while he was the crown prince) on November 19, 1996 at Hua Lamphong station.

Before opened, station was named Bon Kai (Thai: บ่อนไก่) as it is located near Bon Kai neighborhood, but the name got changed to Khlong Toei on October 9, 2002. Although its name is Khlong Toei, Khlong Toei Market is nearer to Queen Sirikit National Convention Center station.

== Station layout ==
G At-grade	Street level	Bus stop, Metropolitan Electricity Authority Headquarters
B1; Basement	Underground walkway	Exits 1–2
B2; Concourse	Concourse	Ticket machines
B3; Platform	Side platform, doors will open on the left
B3; Platform	Platform 2	Blue towards Tha Phra via Bang Sue (QSNCC)
B3; Platform	Platform 1	Blue towards Lak Song (Lumphini)
B3; Platform	Side platform, doors will open on the left

== Station details ==
Uses a Thai house as its symbol, representing Plai Noen House Museum and color orange. It's an underground station, widths 28 metres (92 ft), lengths 202 metres (663 ft), depths 18 metres (59 ft) and uses side platforms

There is MetroMall in the station.
