= Lumphini Subdistrict =

Khwaeng in Bangkok, Thailand

Lumphini ลุมพินี
- Khwaeng
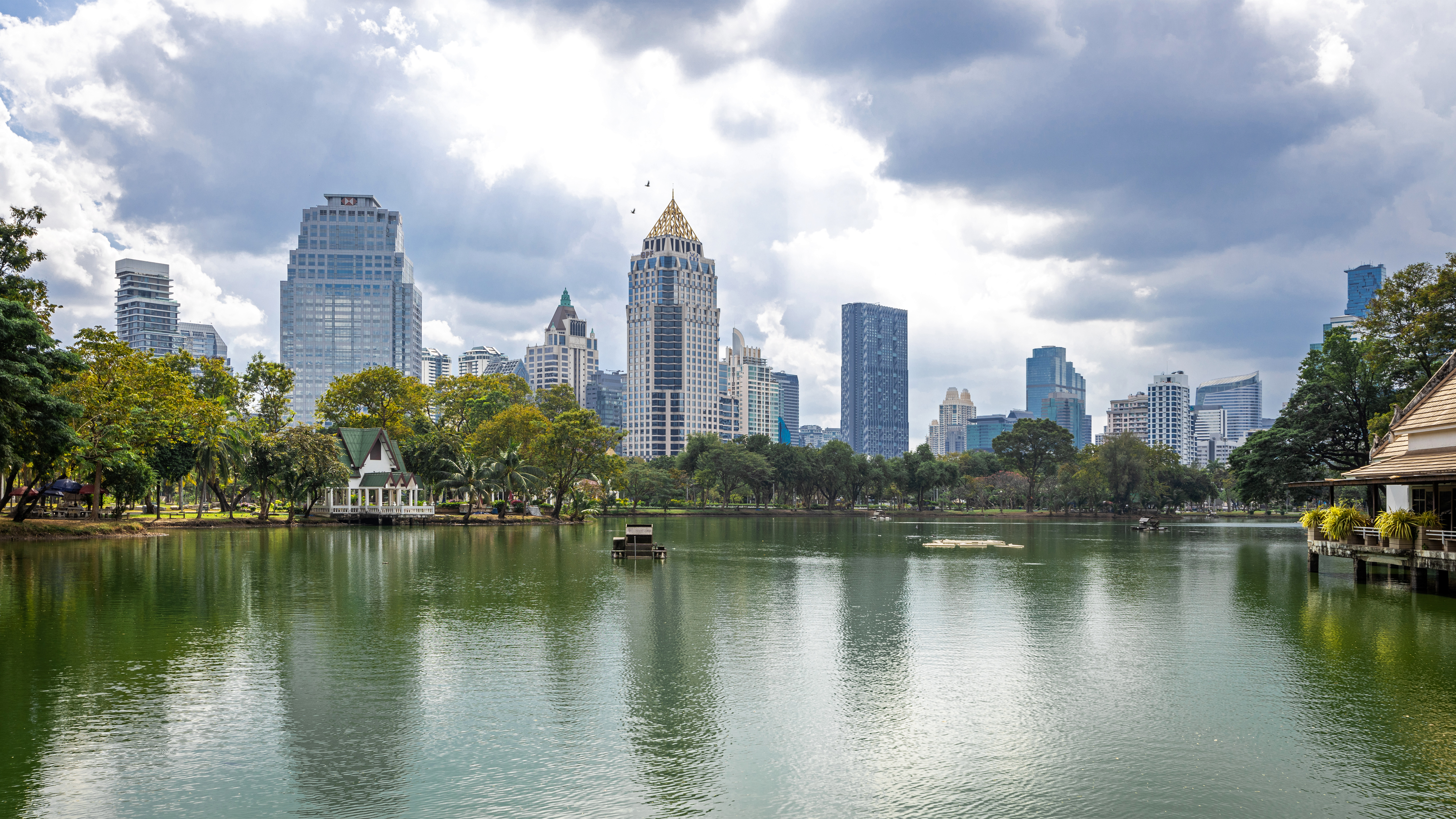
- Lumphini Park

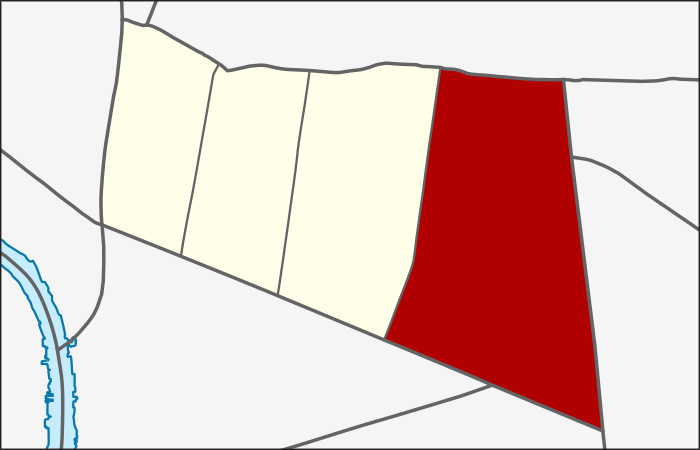
- Location in Pathum Wan District
- Country: Thailand
- Province: Bangkok
- Khet: Pathum Wan

Area
  - Total: 3.485 km^{2} (1.346 sq mi)

Population (2019)
  - Total: 18,345
- Time zone: UTC+7 (ICT)
- Postal code: 10330
- TIS 1099: 100704

Lumphini (Thai: ลุมพินี, pronounced [lum.pʰíː.nīː]), is a khwaeng (subdistrict) of Pathum Wan District, in Bangkok. In 2019, it had a population of 18,345.

== Geography ==
Lumphini is a subdistrict located in the easternmost part of the district. The area is bordered by neighbouring subdistricts (from north clockwise): Makkasan in Ratchathewi District (Khlong Saen Saep is a boundary), Khlong Toei Nuea in Watthana District and Khlong Toei in Khlong Toei District (Maenam railway line is a boundary), Thung Maha Mek in Sathon District, and Si Lom in Bang Rak District (Rama IV Road is a boundary), Pathum Wan in its district (Ratchadamri Road is a boundary).

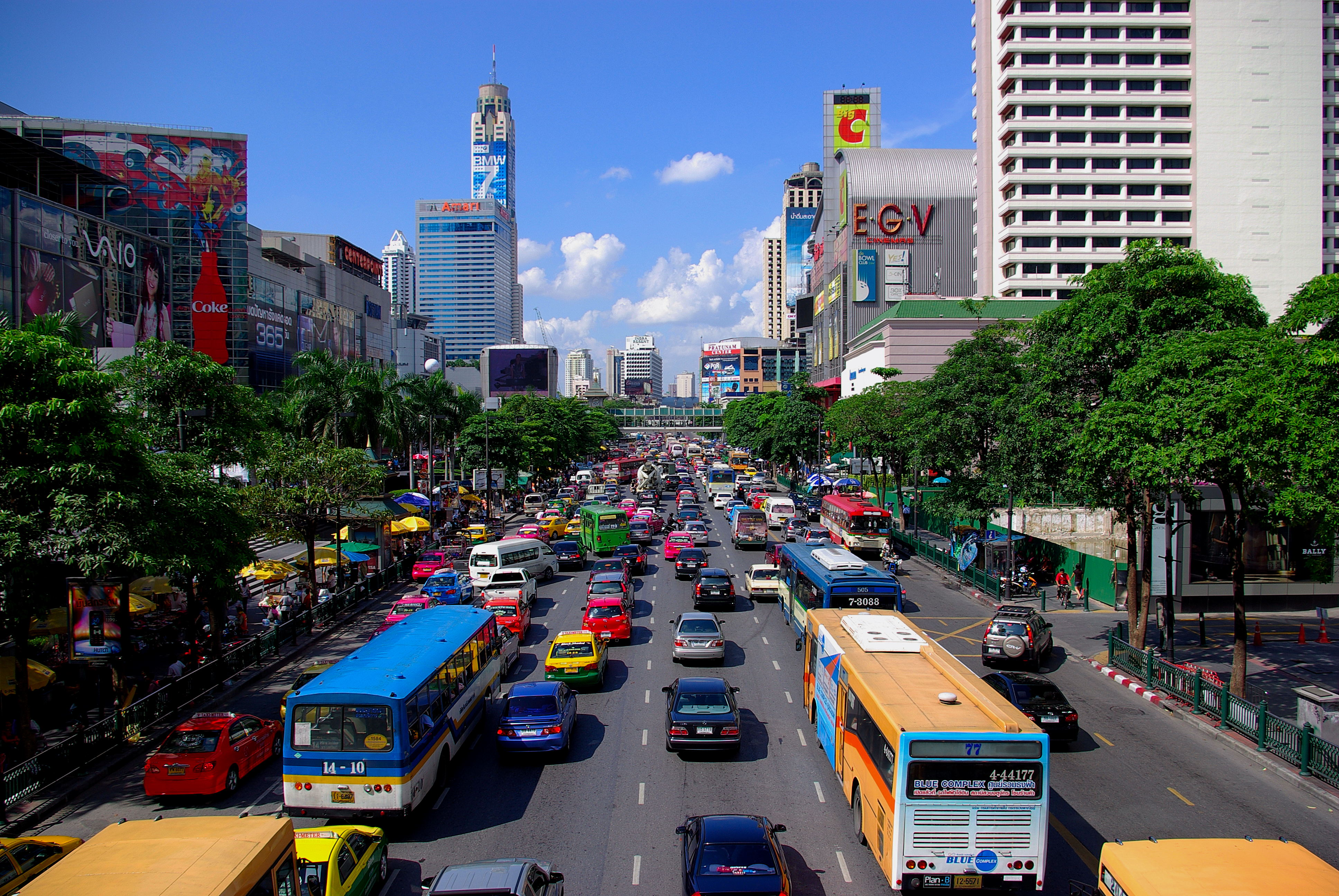
Ratchadamri Road, looking toward Pratunam Intersection (Pathum Wan is on the left, Lumphini is on the right)
