= Phra Khanong Subdistrict =

Phra Khanong พระโขนง
- Khwaeng
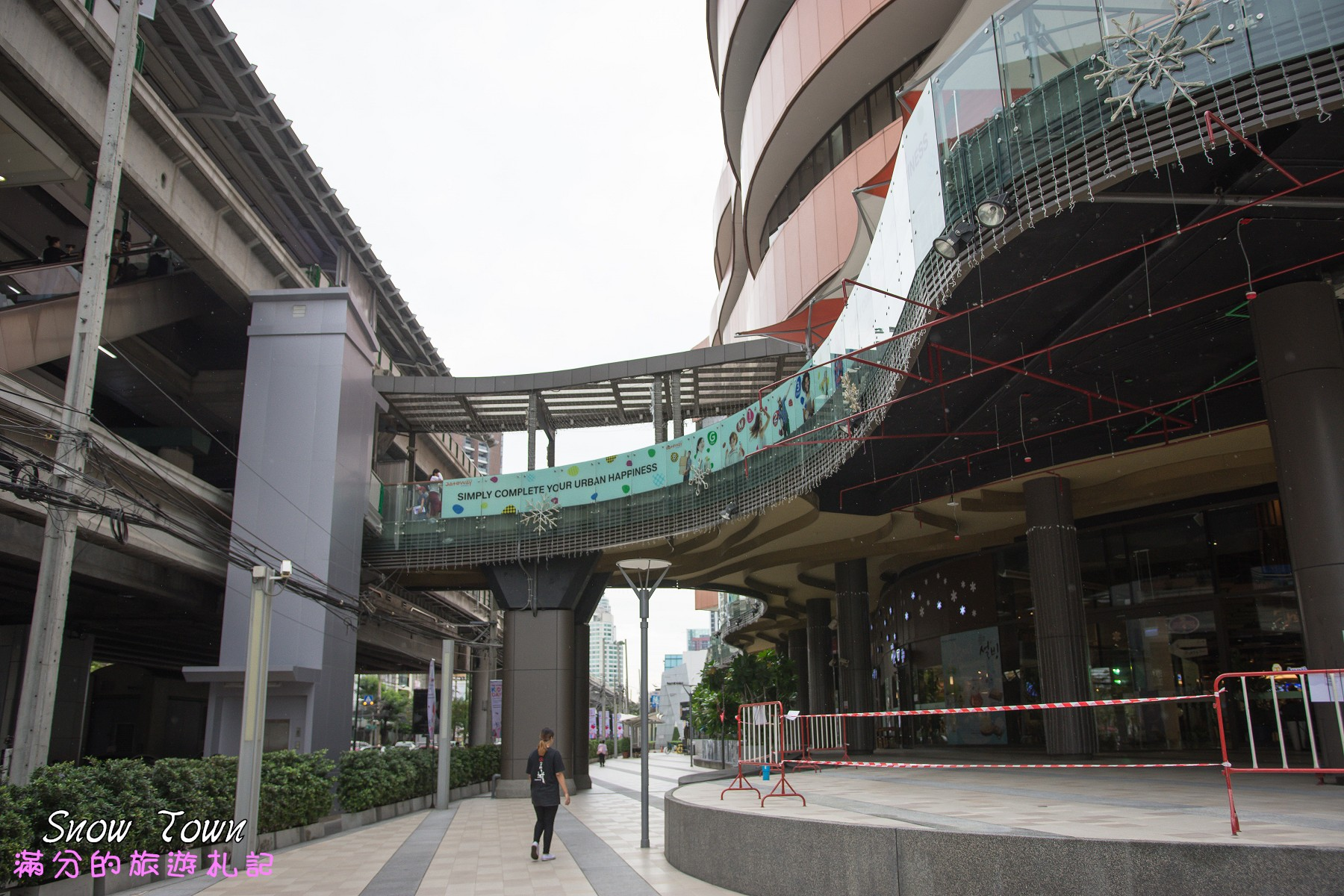
- Gateway Ekamai

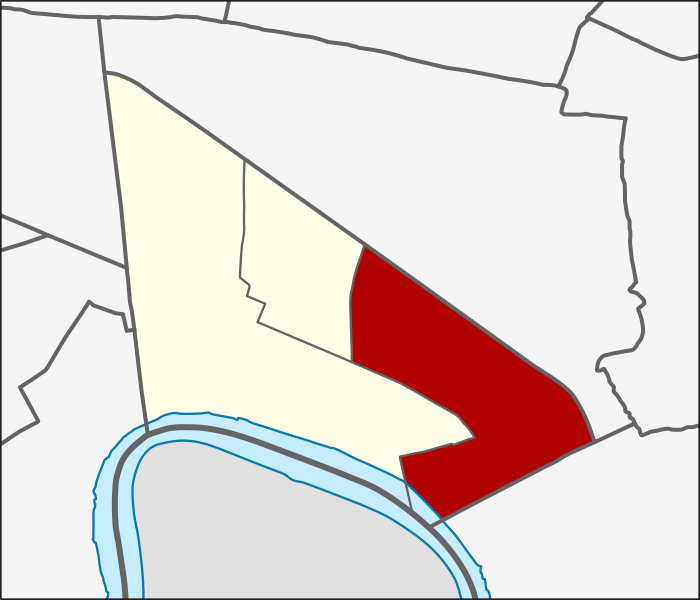
- Location in Khlong Toei district
- Country: Thailand
- Province: Bangkok
- Khet: Khlong Toei

Area
  - Total: 3.850 km^{2} (1.486 sq mi)

Population (2023)
  - Total: 21,058
- Time zone: UTC+7 (ICT)
- Postal code: 10110
- TIS 1099: 103301

Phra Khanong (Thai: พระโขนง, pronounced [pʰráʔ kʰā.nɔ̌ŋ]), is a khwaeng in Khlong Toei District, Bangkok. In 2023, it had a population of 21,058 people.

== Mae Nak Phra Khanong ==
It is believe that Mae Nak is a Thai ghost. Which took place in Phra Khanong area during the reign of King Rama VI.
