= Plai Nern Palace =

Coordinates: 13.721172°N 100.553699°E

Plai Nern Palace (Thai: ตำหนักปลายเนิน, RTGS: Tamnak Plai Noen) or Klong Toei Palace (Thai: วังคลองเตย, RTGS: Wang Khlong Toei) is a former residence of Prince Narisara Nuwattiwong, who was the son of King Mongkut in Khlong Toei District, Bangkok. The palace was built in 1914. The palace allows outsiders to visit as a museum on 29 April every year due to special occasion, Prince Narisara Nuwattiwong birthday.

== History ==
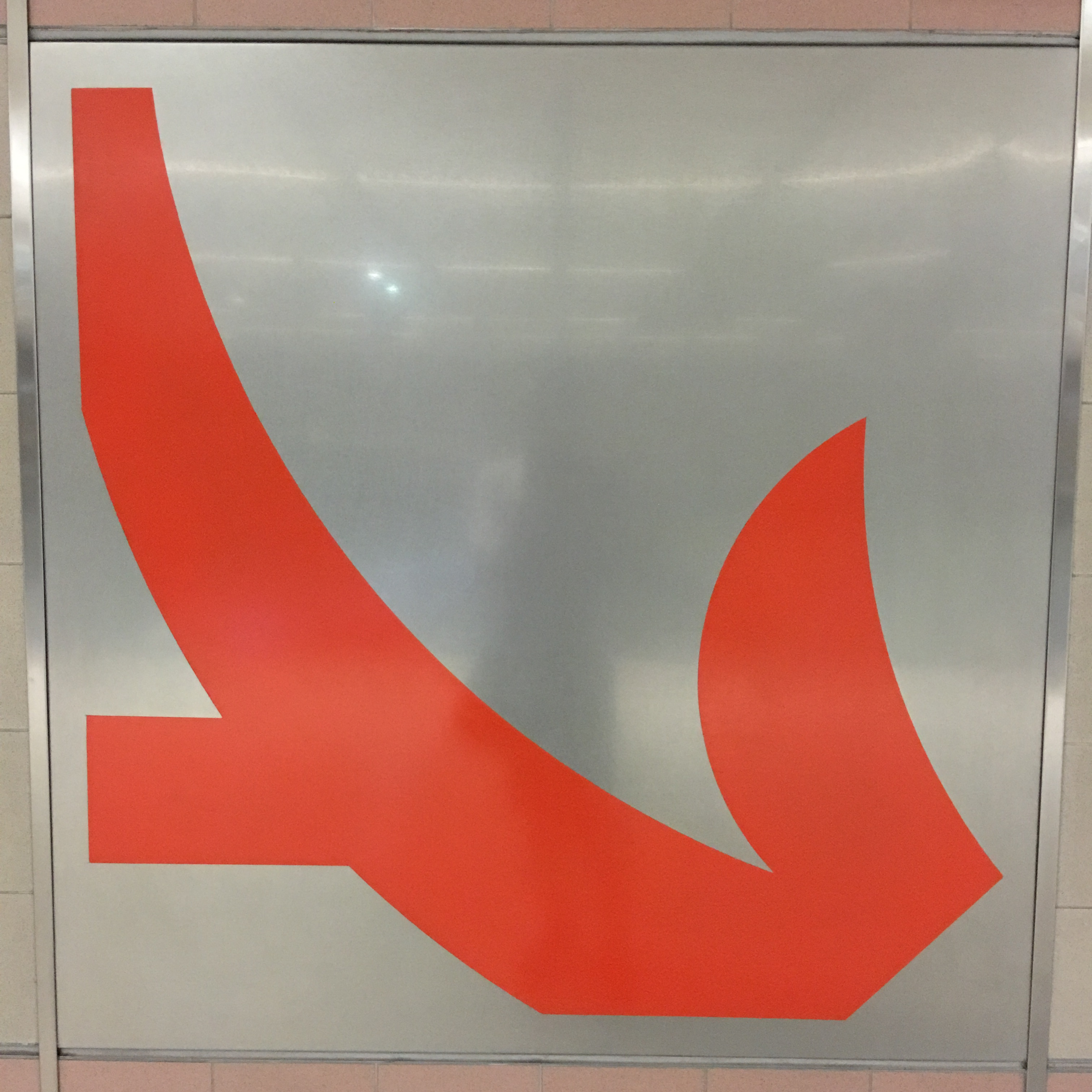
"Plai Nern Palace" – the symbol of Khlong Toei MRT station

Prince Narisara Nuwattiwong wanted to buy a traditional Thai house to build a palace. Construction completed in 1914. He purpose to finish construction quickly and economical because he is often sick when he is at Tha Phra Palace near Grand Palace. When he elderly he decided to lived at Plai Nern Palace as permanent resident and back to Tha Phra Palace in the winter. Prince Narisara Nuwattiwong lived at this palace in Khlong Toei District until his death in 1947 after that this palace is occupancy by his descendants, Chitrabhongse family.

In addition, Princess Sirindhorn come to play Thai music on a regular basis with Prince Naris' youngest daughter Princess Konnika Chitrabongse at Plai Nern Palace.
