= Squatting in Thailand =

Occupation of unused land or derelict buildings without permission of owner

Thailand on globe

Squatting in Thailand was traditionally permissible under customary law and adverse possession can occur after ten years of continuous occupation. As of 2015, the capital Bangkok had over 2 million squatters, out of a population of around 10 million. A survey of slums across the country noted in 2000 that most were rented not squatted; Khlong Toei District in Bangkok contains both squatters and tenants. There are also squatters in rural areas. The 1975 Agricultural Land Reform Act aimed to redistribute land to poor people (including squatters) under the Sor Por Kor program and as of 2019, 36 million rai (5.8 million ha; 14 million acres) of land had been assigned.

== Legal ==
In Thailand, adverse possession was traditionally possible and was known as cap coong. The customary law regarding possession of land was called latti-thamniam, in which all land ultimately belonged to the king and people could farm land, thus gaining de facto rights. In 1901, King Rama V (also known as Chulalongkorn) introduced a system of modern land rights based on ownership which led to general confusion. A 1936 law aimed to clarify matters and the 1954 Land Code regulated land ownership, stating the maximum amount one person could own was 50 rai (8.0 ha; 20 acres). From 1925 onwards, adverse possession requires ten years of continuous occupation under Section 1382 of the Civil and Commercial Code. After he had seized power in 1957, the Prime Minister of Thailand Sarit Thanarat cancelled the 1954 act with Proclamation 49. Following the popular uprising of 1973 and various peasant revolts, the Agricultural Land Reform Act was introduced in 1975. It was intended to redistribute state land, including to those already squatting on it. The program was known as Sor Por Kor (SPK).

== History ==
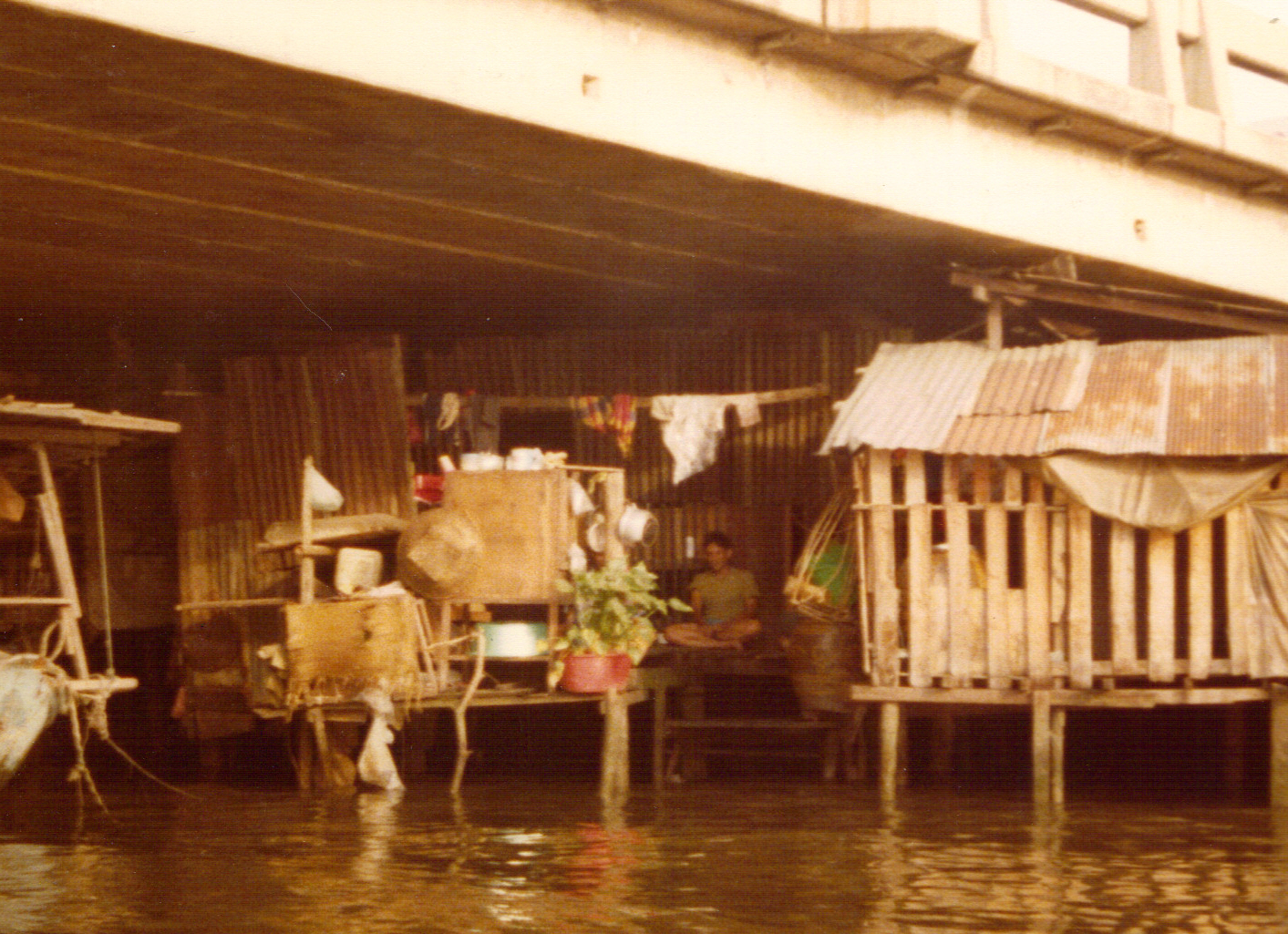
Squatter shacks under a bridge in Bangkok, 1980

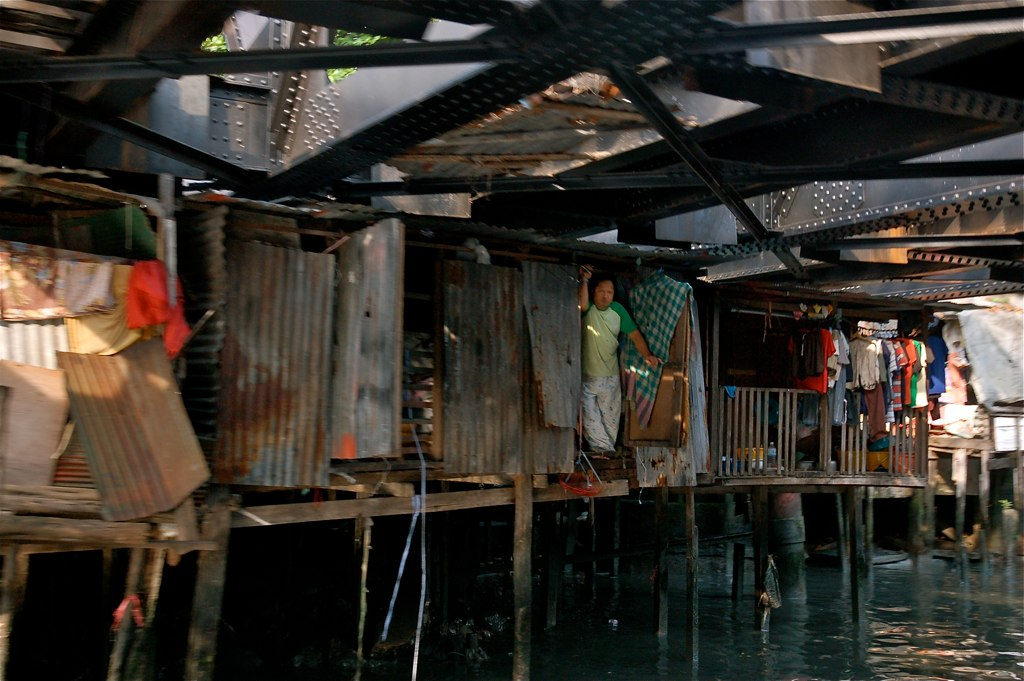
Squatters living under a bridge in Bangkok, 2009

The Government of Thailand tended to evict urban squatters until 1977, when it set up the National Housing Authority (NHA). The NHA focused on community-led development and in 2003, the Baan Mankong slum upgrading project began, aiming to improve security of tenure for 300,000 households in 200 Thai cities. Squatter communities aided by Baan Mankong included Bon Kai in Bangkok, Book Kok in Uttaradit and various informal settlements in Ayutthaya.

The capital Bangkok (or Krung Thep Maha Nakhon) had an estimated 500,000 squatters in the 1960s, making up 24 per cent of its population. In the 1970s and 1980s, the city authorities negotiated with some squatters to develop the land they occupied without displacing them. Deals were made with 10,000 squatters. By 2014, there were over 2 million squatters in Bangkok out of a population of around 10 million. The squatters settlements were of three kinds: large occupations of land owned by the Port Authority or the State Railway of Thailand; smaller occupations of privately owned land; enclaves on land owned by the Crown.

A survey of slums across the country noted in 2000 that most were rented not squatted. There were 125 squatted informal settlements in Bangkok, 181 in the Bangkok Metropolitan Region, 1 in Nakhon Pathom, 10 in Nonthaburi, 28 in Pathum Thani, 13 in Samut Prakan, 4 in Samut Sakhon and 112 in other cities. One of the largest slums in Bangkok is in the Khlong Toei District, where there are 80,000 to 100,000 people, a total which includes tenants and squatters. The overcrowded houses are constructed on stilts above stagnant water and there is little access to running water, sewerage and trash collection.

There are also squatters in rural areas. The Hmong people moved into northern Thailand at the end of the 19th century. The Thai government has attempted to resettle them into villages, aiming to stop deforestation and the production of opium. In 1986, 5,000 people were evicted from Khlong Hai in Kamphaeng Phet province and the following year over 1,000 Akha, Lahu and Lisu peoples were deported to Burma. In 1981, farmers occupying land in forest reserves were offered land rights for up to 5 rai (or 2.4 hectares), known as STK licences. By 1987, at least 5.3 million hectares of land (that is to say 20 per cent of all land designated as forest) was being farmed by a million rural squatters. Even if the families had been living on the land for over ten years, they were still termed squatters, yet evictions were rare. The Royal Forest Department slowly began to legalize occupations by giving out individual certificates, then the program was taken over by the Agricultural Land Reform Office, part of the Ministry of Agriculture and Cooperatives. STK licenses were replaced by SPK-4.01s (SPK being Sor Por Kor).

== Sor Por Kor ==
Under the Sor Por Kor program, the government intended to distribute 40 million rai (or 6.4 million hectares) of land to poor farmers, some of them squatters. By 2019, 36 million rai (or 5.8 million hectares) had been assigned and 800,000 farmers were still waiting to receive land rights. The Ministry of Agriculture and Cooperatives announced it would be investigating cases in which farmers had illegally sold their land or were not qualified to receive it. At Phu Thap Boek in Lom Kao District, Sor Por Kor plots were being built on by developers despite being supposed to be owned by the Hmong people. In Wang Nam Khiao District, an area which attracts tourism for its natural beauty, an investigation by the Royal Forest Department (RFD) discovered that luxury resorts existed on 21 Sor Por Kor sites. The RFD decided to take action against the wealthy encroachers but experienced opposition and the local police chief received death threats. After 22 resorts and holiday homes were demolished, resort owners welcomed new proposals in 2020 for them to rent their Sor Por Kor plots.
