= Queen Sirikit National Convention Center =

Convention center in Bangkok, Thailand

Queen Sirikit National Convention Center ศูนย์การประชุมแห่งชาติสิริกิติ์

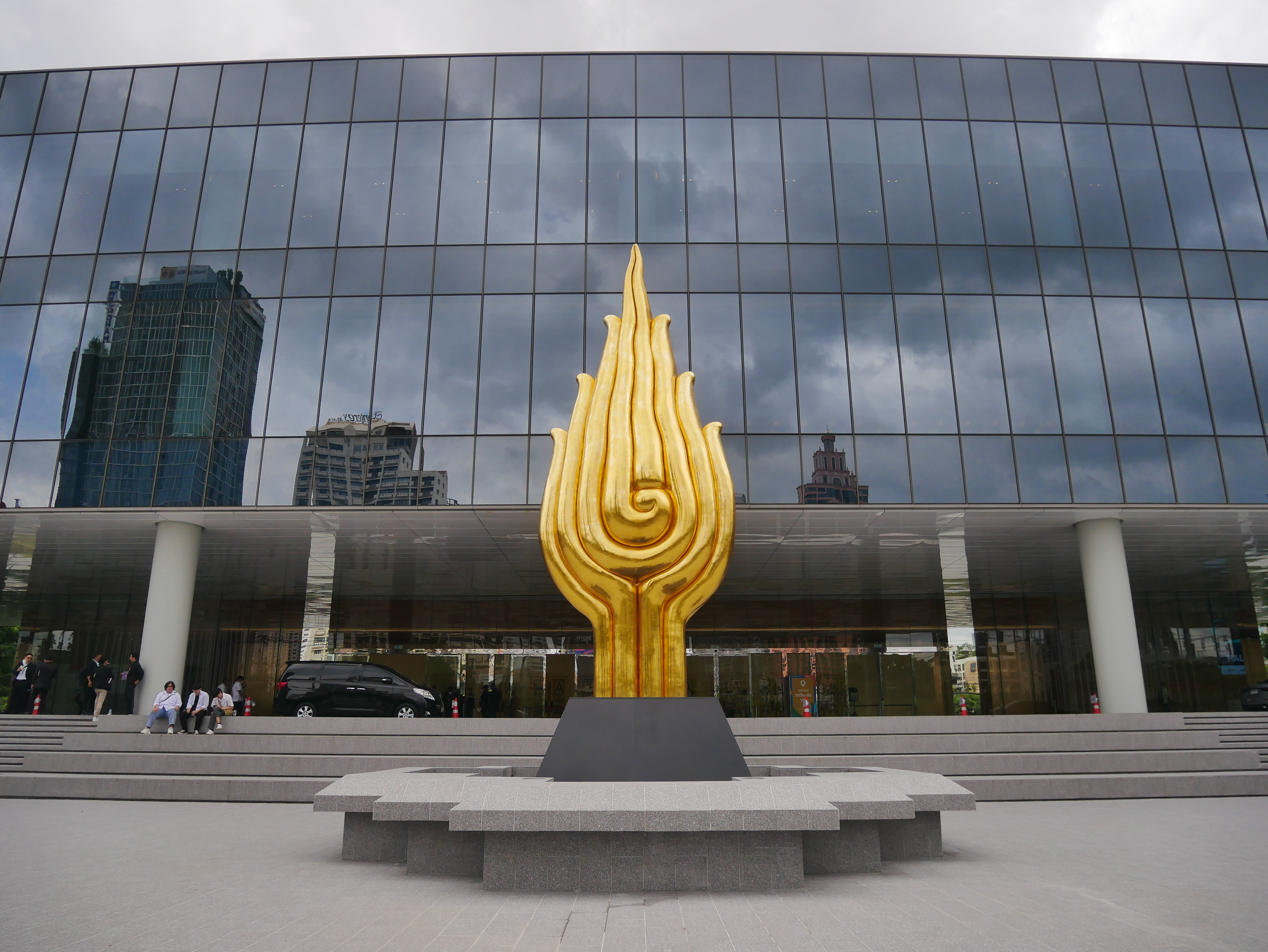
- Queen Sirikit National Convention Centre in 2022
- Interactive map of Queen Sirikit National Convention Center ศูนย์การประชุมแห่งชาติสิริกิติ์
- Address: 60 New Ratchadaphisek Road, Khlong Toei, Bangkok, Thailand
- Location: Bangkok, Thailand
- Coordinates: 13.723992°N 100.559222°E
- Public transit: MRT QSNCC MRT station

Construction
- Built: 1 November 1989 - 29 August 1991
- Opened: 29 August 1991 (Original Building); 12 September 2022 (Current Building)
- Renovated: 26 April 2019 - 11 September 2022

Website
- www.qsncc.com

Queen Sirikit National Convention Center (QSNCC) (Thai: ศูนย์การประชุมแห่งชาติสิริกิติ์), also known as Queen Sirikit Convention Center or simply Queen Sirikit Center, is a convention center and exhibition hall in Bangkok, Thailand. The center is regarded as a public asset according to the Thai Ministry of Finance's Treasury Department. However, it has been managed by N.C.C. Management & Development Co., Ltd., a private firm, since its opening in 1991. The QSNCC was built to host events, especially conferences and exhibitions and has hosted numerous international events. The QSNCC is also home to the Plenary Hall, a theatre style hall, which has a capacity of 6,000 persons. It is served by Queen Sirikit National Convention Centre MRT station on the MRT Blue Line, which traverse underneath Ratchadaphisek Road, the road where the convention center is located on.

== History ==
In September 1987, Suthee Singhasaneh, the Minister of Finance, and Kamchorn Sathirakul, the Bank of Thailand Governor jointly signed a deal between the Royal Thai Government and the World Bank/International Monetary Fund (IMF) to host the 46th Annual Meeting of the Boards of Governors of the World Bank Group and IMF in Bangkok between 1 October to 15 October 1991. As a result, the QSNCC was constructed as a sign of Thailand's commitment to host this event. As for the architectural design, a leading Thai architectural firm was assigned to design a structure that reflected Thai culture and heritage for the QSNCC.

To ensure that the center would be completed on time, a design-build delivery system was used and the construction started in 1 November 1989. Construction began with 100 designers and more than 1000 construction workers. The bulk of construction was finished by 30 June 1991, under budget and about two months before the scheduled date of 29 August 1991. It was finished in only 16 months. Projects of this magnitude normally take 40 months.

On 29 August 1991, King Bhumibol Adulyadej and Queen Sirikit officially opened the Queen Sirikit National Convention Center. The center was named after Queen Sirikit in honour of her 60th birthday.

The convention center was closed for a 12 billion baht renovation on 26 April 2019 and reopen on 12 September 2022 with three times the original venue space.

On 9 February 2022, Queen Sirikit National Convention Center was selected as the main meeting venue of APEC Thailand 2022, which was held between 16-19 November 2022.

== Entertainment events ==
Entertainment events at Queen Sirikit National Convention Center
| Date | Artist | Event | Ref |
2023
| 5-6 August, 2023 | Exo-SC | Back to Back Fancon | |
2024
| 16-17 March, 2024 | Choi Young-jae | ‘Inside Out’ Asia Tour | |
| 17-18 August, 2024 | BamBam | [BAMESIS] Showcase Concert Tour | |
| 31 August - 1 September, 2024 | Billkin & PP Krit | DOUBLE TROUBLE Concert | |
2025
| 15 March, 2025 | Jisoo | Lights, Love, Action! Asia Tour | |

== Expo ==
- 46th Annual Meeting of the Boards of Governors of the World Bank Group and IMF
- 1st ASEAN Seafood Expo & Conference
- Miss Universe 1992
- APEC Thailand 2003
- APEC Thailand 2022
- Annual National Book Fair
- Thailand Game Show
- Wonder Festival Bangkok 2023
- Nippon Haku Bangkok
- Gamescom Asia × Thailand Game Show
- Anime Festival Asia

== Gallery ==
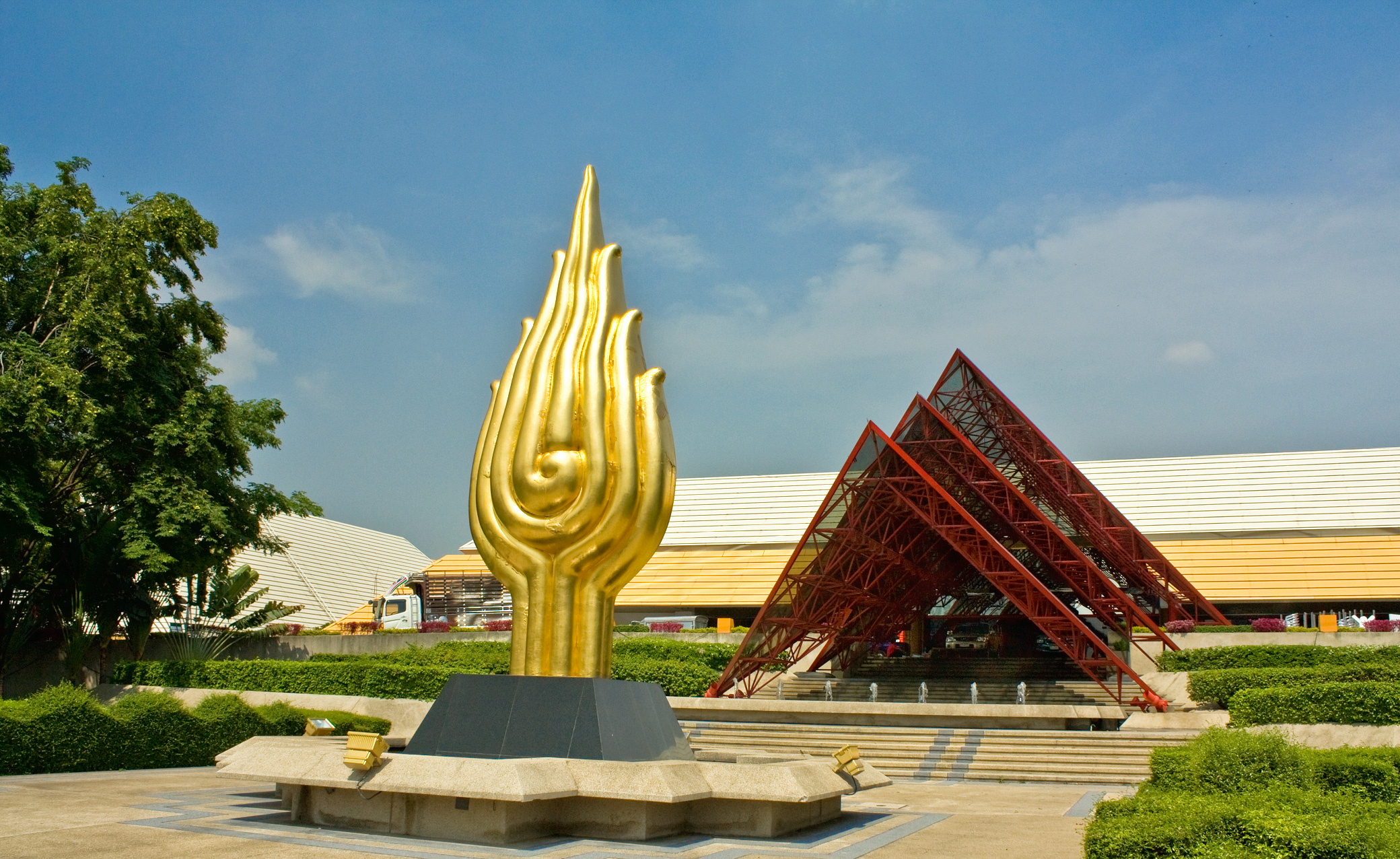
Queen Sirikit National Convention Center before renovation in 2019

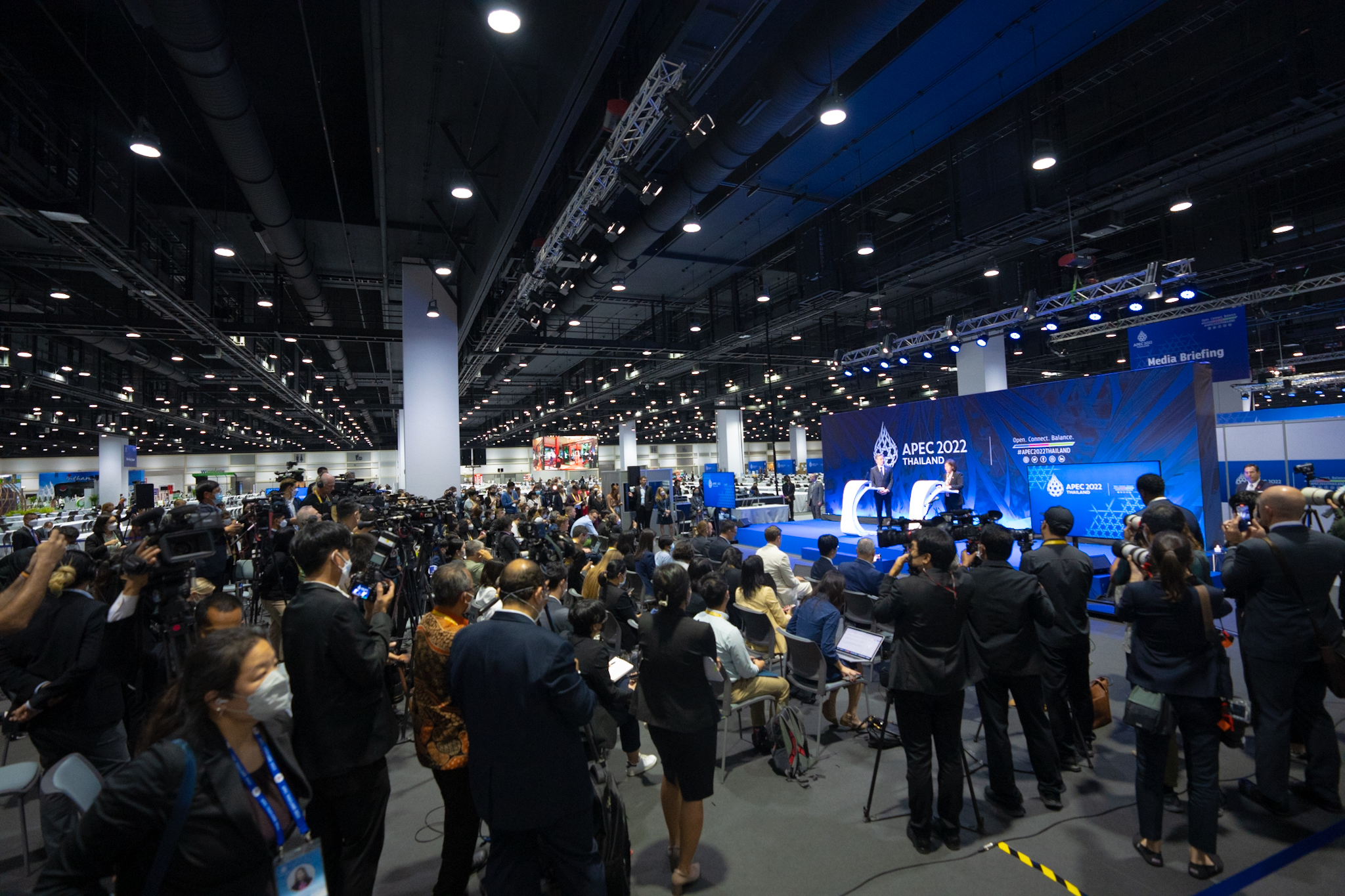
QSNCC during APEC 2022

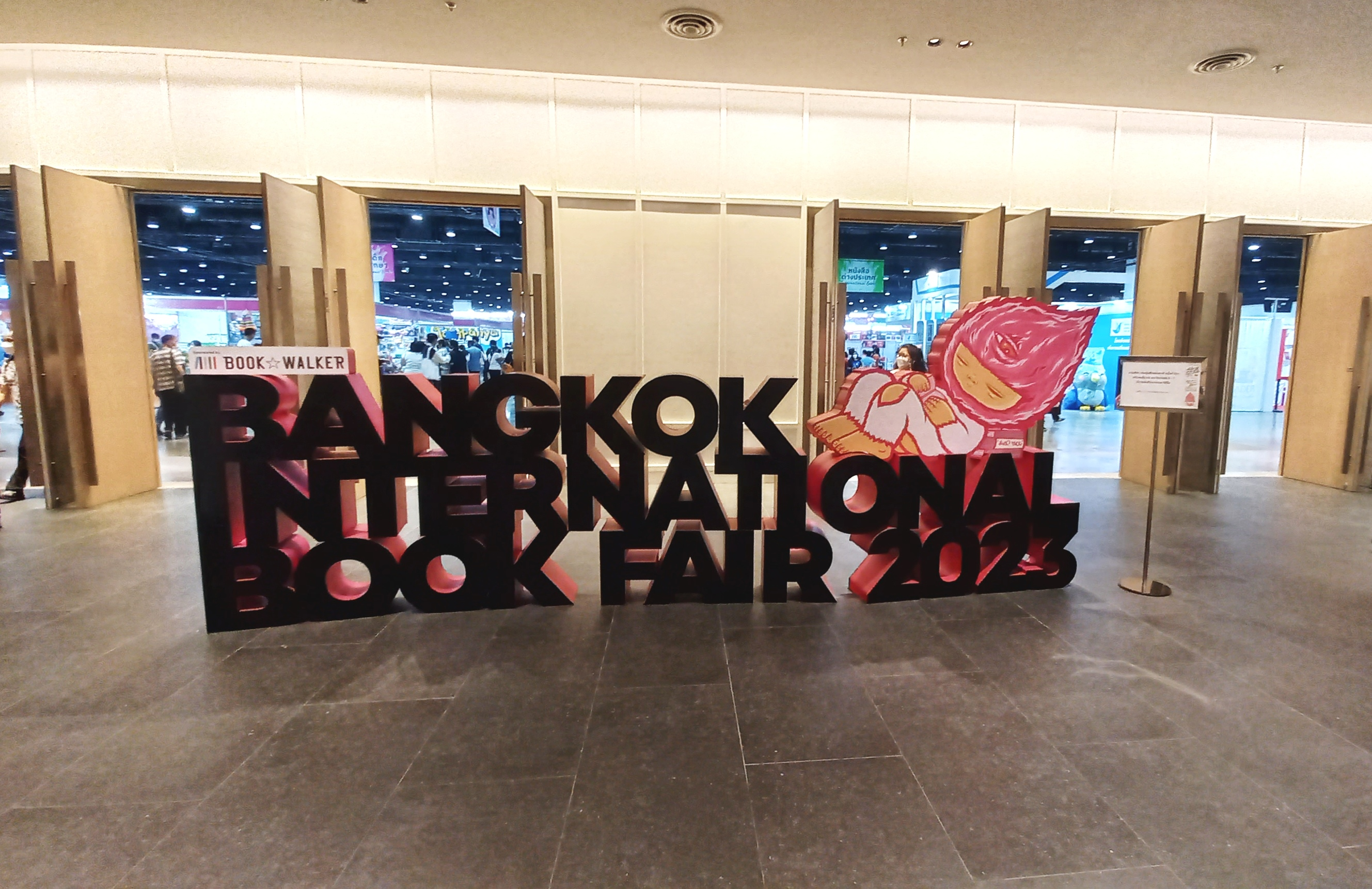
QSNCC during Bangkok International Book Fair 2023

| Preceded by Aladdin Theatre for the Performing Arts (United States) Las Vegas | Miss Universe Venue; 1992 | Succeeded by National Auditorium; Mexico City |
