= Sacred Heart Convent School (Thailand) =

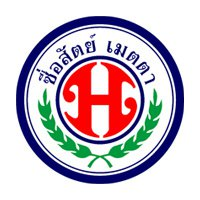

Location
- 94 Sunthornkosa Road, Khlong Toei, Bangkok; Thailand
- Coordinates: 13.7181°N 100.5573°E

Information
- Type: Private Roman Catholic Non-profit all-girls basic education institution
- Motto: ซื่อสัตย์ เมตตา วิชาเป็นเลิศ รัก เทิดคุณธรรม ("Honest, Kind, Knowledgeable, Love and Honor Integrity")
- Religious affiliation(s): Roman Catholic
- Established: February 28, 1934; 91 years ago
- Founder: Sr.Seraphine de Marie Lutenbraker, SPC
- Director: Sister Dr. Patchara Nantajinda
- Color(s): Red and white
- Website: www.shc.ac.th/

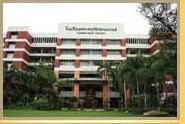
Sirinthep Building of Sacred Heart Convent School in 2014

The Sacred Heart Convent School (Thai: โรงเรียนพระหฤทัยคอนแวนต์) is a private, Catholic college preparatory school in Khlong Toei District, Bangkok, Thailand. It is a private school that is located in the center of downtown Bangkok. It was previously an all-girls school. It is now a mixed school with separate Thai and English programs.

The school was established on 28 February 1934 and was officially approved on 10 January 1937. It initially offered Grades 1 to 4. In 1975, the school opened a kindergarten program and used a 2-storey wooden building as a classroom. In 2002, The English Program (EP) was introduced.

== History ==
Sr.Séraphine de Marie Luttenbacher, SPC (née: Eugénie Luttenbacher) is a religious nun of Sisters of Saint Paul of Chartres. She is from Alsace, France. As a religious nun, she was assigned by her congregation to Saigon, Vietnam. She was transferred to Siam to be the rector of Saint Louis Hospital, Bangkok and then She was appointed as rector of the religious sisters assigned to the St. Francis-Xavier Catholic Church, Samsen in 1903.

In 1924, René-Marie-Joseph Perros (Apostolic Vicar to Bangkok) was convincing the religious sisters assigned to the St. Francis-Xavier Catholic Church, Samsen to join the Congregation of the Sisters of Sacred Heart of Jesus of Bangkok and he appointed Sr.Seraphine de Marie Lutenbraker as rector.

In 1934, Sr.Séraphine de Marie Luttenbacher opened the first school of the Sisters of the Sacred Heart of Jesus of Bangkok and named it "Couvent de Sacré Coeur".

During the early days of this school, it used a Thai and French name and used Thai and French language as the medium of instruction in school but now has changed French to English.

== School symbol ==
"H" comes from 8H which stand for Heart, Holy, Honest, Honor, Humble, Hospitality, Hope, and Home. H is supported by branches. The green leaves represent the people while the limb is the society which are dependent on one another. H in the circle means that it is the center of the Congregation of the Sacred Hearts of Jesus in Bangkok that unites the administrators, teachers, and students.

Red and white are the school colors, which symbolize love of humanity, following the example of Jesus. Red represents love which mirrors the love of Jesus. White represents purity, optimism, benevolence, absolution, and goodwill towards others.

== At present ==
Sacred Heart Convent School has three sections: Kindergarten (3–5 years old), Primary (grades 1–6) and high school (grades 7–12). The Active Conversation English Program (ACE) studies English with IDEAL teachers two hours a week. It provides for kindergarten and primary sections. The Intensive Program (IP) studies English with IDEAL teachers five hours a week. It provides for primary and high school sections. The ASEAN Program (AP) studies English with IDEAL teachers two hours a week and Chinese two hours a week. It provides for primary and junior high school (grades 7–9) sections. The English Program (EP) provides teaching and learning in English in all subjects except Thai and social science with IDEAL teachers. It provides for all sections.

== Campuses ==
- Phraharuthai Nontaburi School
- Phraharuthai Donmuang School
- Phraharuthai Sawankhalok School
- Phraharuthai Patthanaves School

== Alumnus ==
- Rhatha Phongam: singer, actress
- Chanidapa Pongsilpipat: actress, model
- Ungsumalynn Sirapatsakmetha: actress
- Jarinporn Joonkiat: actress
- Nathathai Saengphech: singer
