= Khlong Tan subdistrict =

Khlong Tan คลองตัน
- Khwaeng
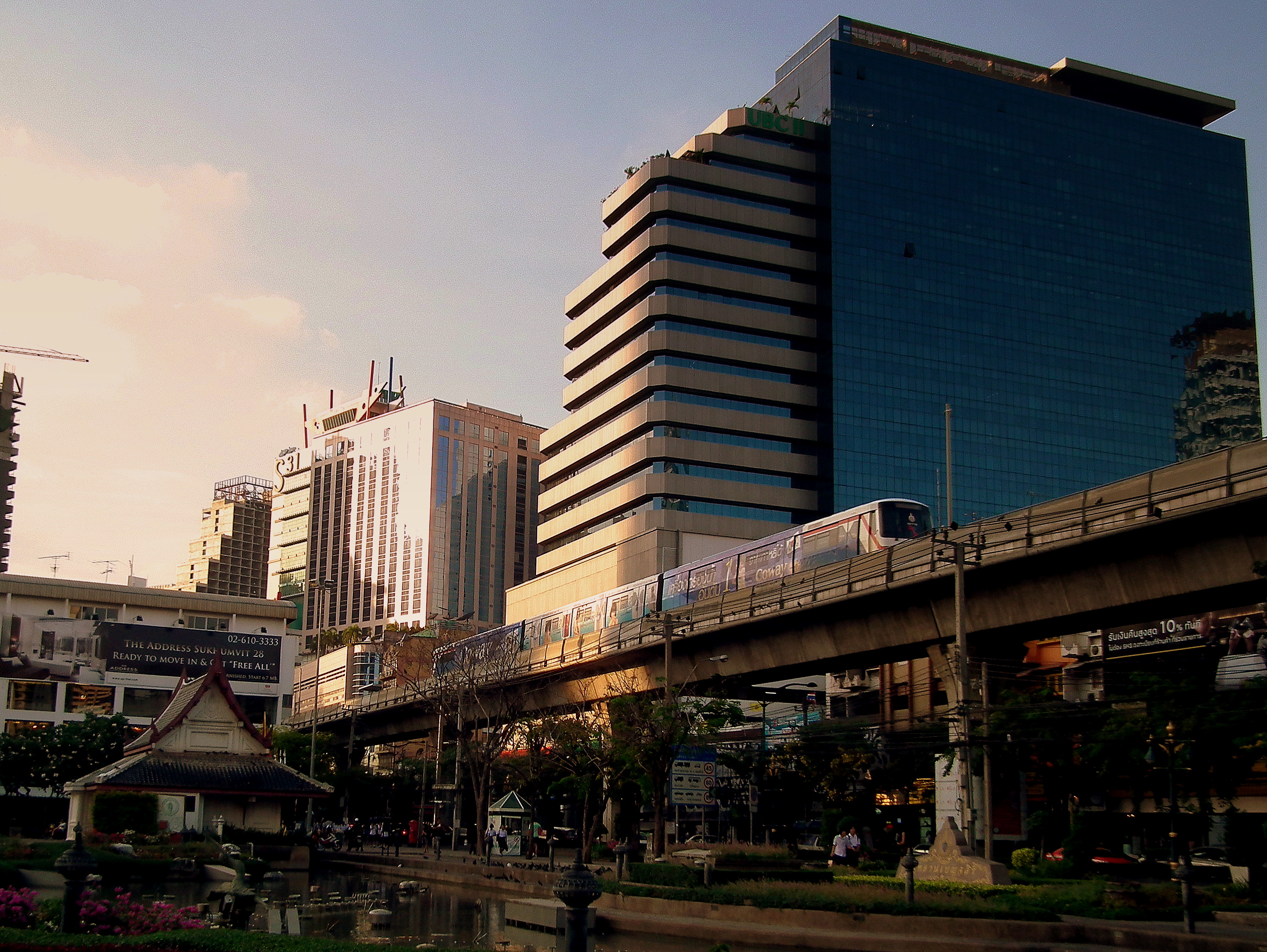
- Benjasiri Park

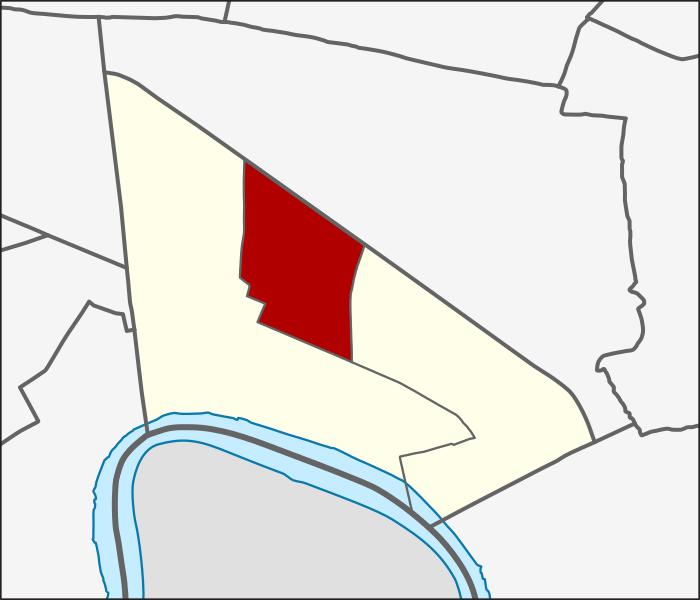
- Location in Khlong Toei district
- Country: Thailand
- Province: Bangkok
- Khet: Khlong Toei

Area
  - Total: 1.895 km^{2} (0.732 sq mi)

Population (2021)
  - Total: 10,573
  - Density: 5,579.42/km^{2} (14,450.6/sq mi)
- Time zone: UTC+7 (ICT)
- Postal code: 10110
- TIS 1099: 103302

Khlong Tan (Thai: คลองตัน, pronounced [kʰlɔ̄ːŋ tān]) is a khwaeng (subdistrict) in Khlong Toei district, Bangkok. In 2021, it had a population of 10,573 people.
