= Bangkok Port =

International port in Thailand

Coordinates: 13°42′13.45″N 100°34′31.61″E

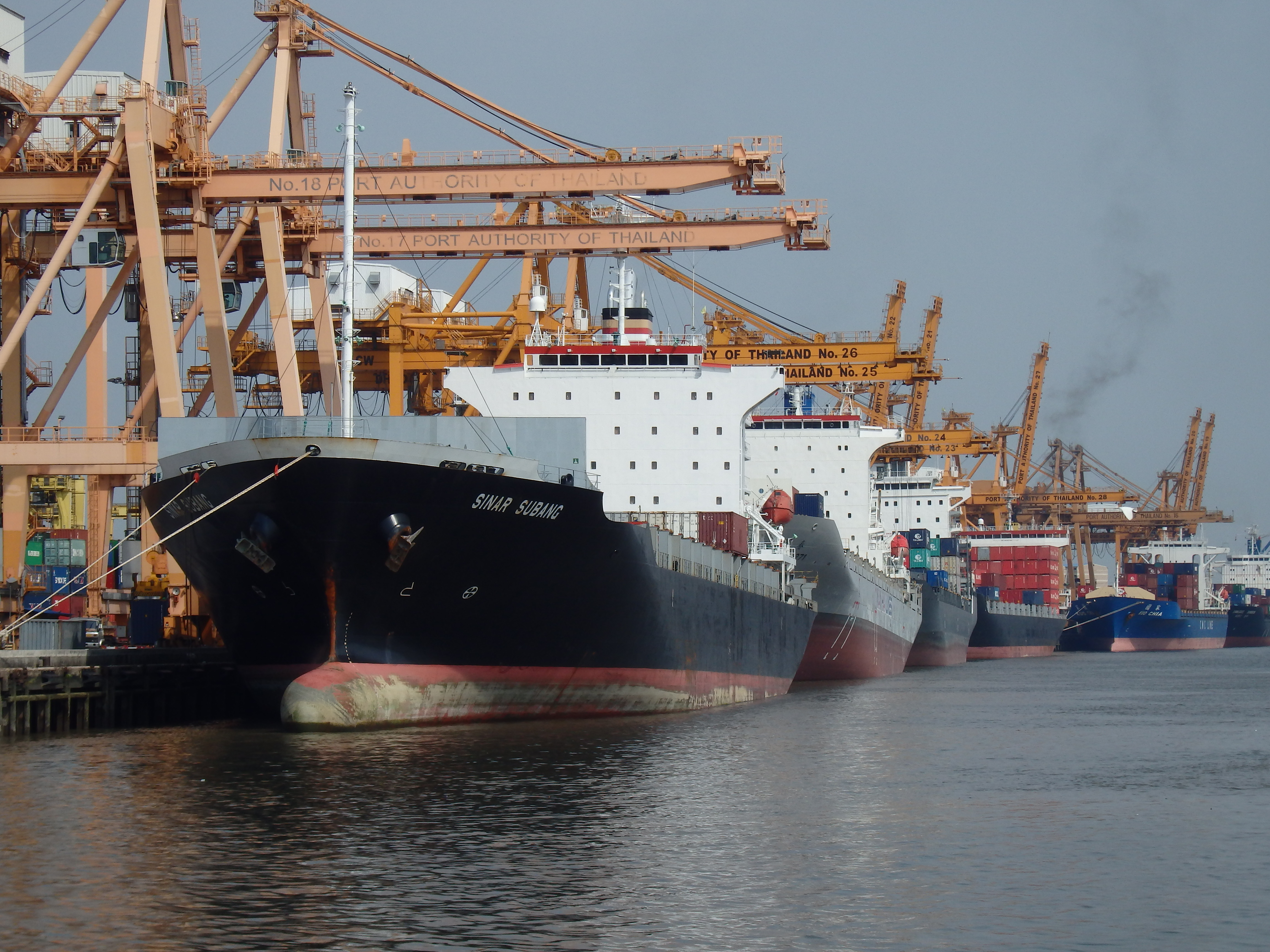
Cargo ships at Bangkok Port

Bangkok Port (Thai: ท่าเรือกรุงเทพ) (BKP), popularly known as Khlong Toei Port (ท่าเรือคลองเตย), is an international port on the Chao Phraya River in Khlong Toei District of the Thai capital city, Bangkok. It is operated by the Port Authority of Thailand. Until recently, Bangkok Port was one of the world's 100 busiest container ports. The port also offers a conventional quay for loading and unloading cargo. The maximal ship length is 172 m (564 ft) and the draft 8.2 m (27 ft) for the container ships.

== History ==
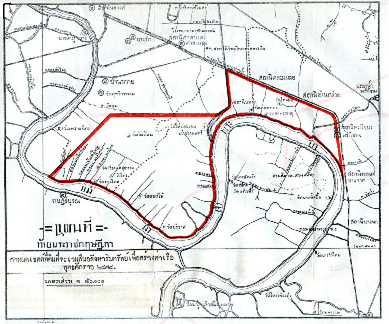
1935 map plan of Khlong Toei Port

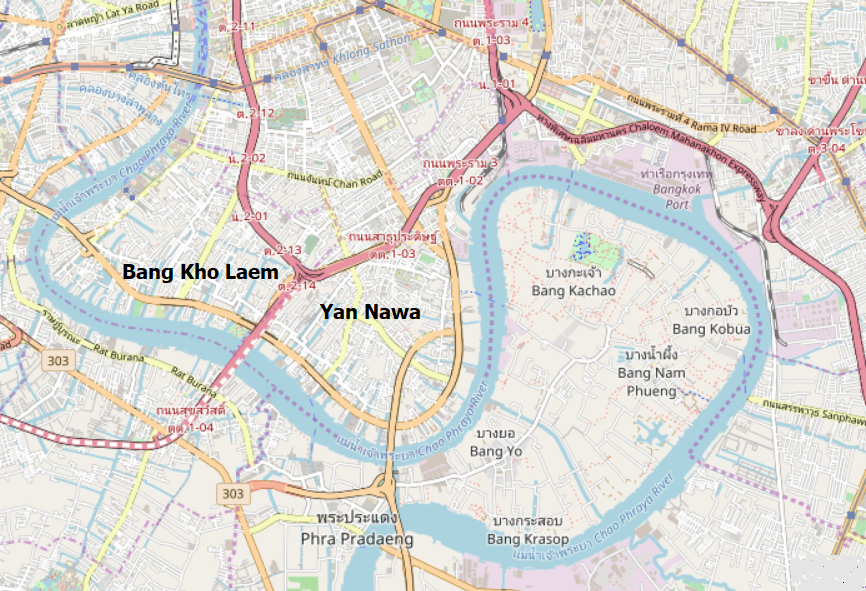
2020 map of Khlong Toei Port

After the Siamese revolution in 1932, instead of transferring cargo from ship to ship moored in the harbour bays of Ko Sichang and Bangkok, the government wanted to build a port. In 1934 they contacted the League of Nations headquarters in Geneva, Switzerland to advise on the construction of a modern harbour. There were two proposals for the location, the Khlong Toei District and Samut Prakan. Decision was made for the Khlong Toei District. A royal decree expropriated land for the construction of a port in Bangkok on 6 August 1935. Initially, this included almost all of the Yan Nawa District and was part of Bang Kho Laem District. Construction of the port and dredging of the Chao Phraya River started in 1938. Construction was interrupted due to World War II in 1940. At the end of the war, in 1945 the pier was only 1,500 m (4,920 ft) long and work on the construction of the port resumed with a loan from the World Bank. The first phase of the port was completed in 1947 and opened for the first time. Expanding of the port started, with also dredging of the navigator channels from the mouth of the Chao Phraya River in Samut Prakan Province to the Bangkok Port, a total distance of 66 km (41 mi).

=== 1947–1991 ===
The Bangkok Port area is on the east side of the Chao Phraya River in Khlong Toei District occupying over 900 acres (3.6 km^{2}). It was Thailand's main international port, primarily a cargo port, though its inland location limits access to ships of 12,000 deadweight tonnes or less and not longer than 172 m (564 ft). The port boomed during the 1950s. To meet growing traffic, Kloeng Toey Port saw massive expansion in the early 1980s. It handled 98 percent of Thailand's imports, 60 percent of outgoing goods, and 40 percent of coastal traffic. Despite attempts to improve port infrastructure, the port remained inadequate.

=== 1991–present ===
Thus the Port of Laem Chabang was built, reducing Bangkok Port's tonnage. Although the port's flow of imports has gone down by 40 percent, post-1995 export cargo volume has remained at a satisfactory level. The port handled 11,936,855 tonnes (13,158,130 tons) of cargo in the first eight months of the 2010 fiscal year, about 22 percent the total of the country's international ports. Bangkok Port had 3,067 vessel calls in FY2016. Cargo tonnage was 21 million. Cargo volume totalled 1.5 million TEUs. Bangkok Port was one of the world's busiest container ports, but is no longer on the Lloyd's list "One Hundred Container Ports 2019".

== Specifications of Bangkok Port ==
| Berth/Dolphin/Buoy | Total length | No. of berth |
|---|---|---|
| East quay | 1,528 m - 5,013 ft | 8 |
| West quay | 1,660 m - 5,446 ft | 10 |
| Dolphin Khlong Toei | 1,400 m - 4,593 ft | 36 |
| Dolphin Hua Sua | 1,520 m - 4,987 ft | 25 |
| Mooring buoy at Sathu Pradit | 1,580 m - 5,183 ft | 5 |

| Mechanical Handling Equipment | Capacity | Quantity |
|---|---|---|
| Gantry crane (rail mounted) | 32 - 40 Ton | 14 |
| Gantry crane (rubber tyres) | 30 - 40 Ton | 36 |
| Top loader | 40 Ton | 35 |
| Empty container stacker | 7 Ton | 25 |
| Mobile crane | 50 Ton | 7 |
| Mobile crane | 10 Ton | 3 |
| Forklift truck | var.size | 223 |

| Storage area | |
|---|---|
| Container terminal 1 | 9.9 ha - 24.5 acre |
| Container terminal 2 | 4.9 ha - 12.1 acre |
| Open yard for stuffing | 2,208 TEUs |
| Empty container yard | 8,520 TEUs |
