= Port Authority of Thailand =

Government agency of Thailand

Port Authority of Thailand (PAT)
- Native name: การท่าเรือแห่งประเทศไทย
- Type: State enterprise
- Industry: Shipping
- Headquarters: Bangkok, Thailand
- Key people: Chayatan Phromsorn (Chairman)
- Services: Port management
- Parent: Ministry of Transport
- Website: www.port.co.th

The Port Authority of Thailand (PAT) (Thai: การท่าเรือแห่งประเทศไทย, RTGS: Kan Tha Ruea Haeng Prathet Thai) is a government agency of Thailand, responsible for the regulation and governance of the ports of Thailand, primarily the ports of Laem Chabang and Bangkok Port, the country's two largest. PAT operates Thai ports in conjunction with public companies including Hutchison Ports Thailand and PSA International.

== History ==
The PAT was founded by the Port Authority of Thailand Act 1951 as an autonomous government agency under the jurisdiction of the Ministry of Transportation and Communications. In 1961 construction was begun on the port of Laem Chabang, due to overcrowding at Bangkok Port. By 1997 Laem Chabang had become the country's busiest seaport. In 2000 the Port Authority of Thailand was converted from a government agency to a state corporation under the jurisdiction of the Ministry of Transport by amendment to the Port Authority of Thailand Act 1951.

=== Land bridge project ===
The Southern Economic Corridor (SEC) includes a land bridge megaproject that is expected to connect transportation between the Andaman Sea and the Gulf of Thailand. There will be a 89.35-kilometre transport network with 2 deep-sea ports: 1 in Laem Riow, Chumphon, and another in Laem Ao Ang, Ranong.

== Operations ==
Ports under the governance of PAT include those of Bangkok Port, Laem Chabang, Chiang Saen, Chiang Khong, Ranong, as well as the Bangkok Coastal and Barge Domestic Terminal.

As of November 2016, the latest annual report available, for 2014, contains operational statistics, but no financial information.

In FY2016 PAT ports handled 9,379 vessel calls, down 1.8 percent from FY2015. Total cargo volume was 93.4 million tons, down two percent. Container throughput was 8.6 million TEUs, up 2.7 percent.

=== Laem Chabang Port ===
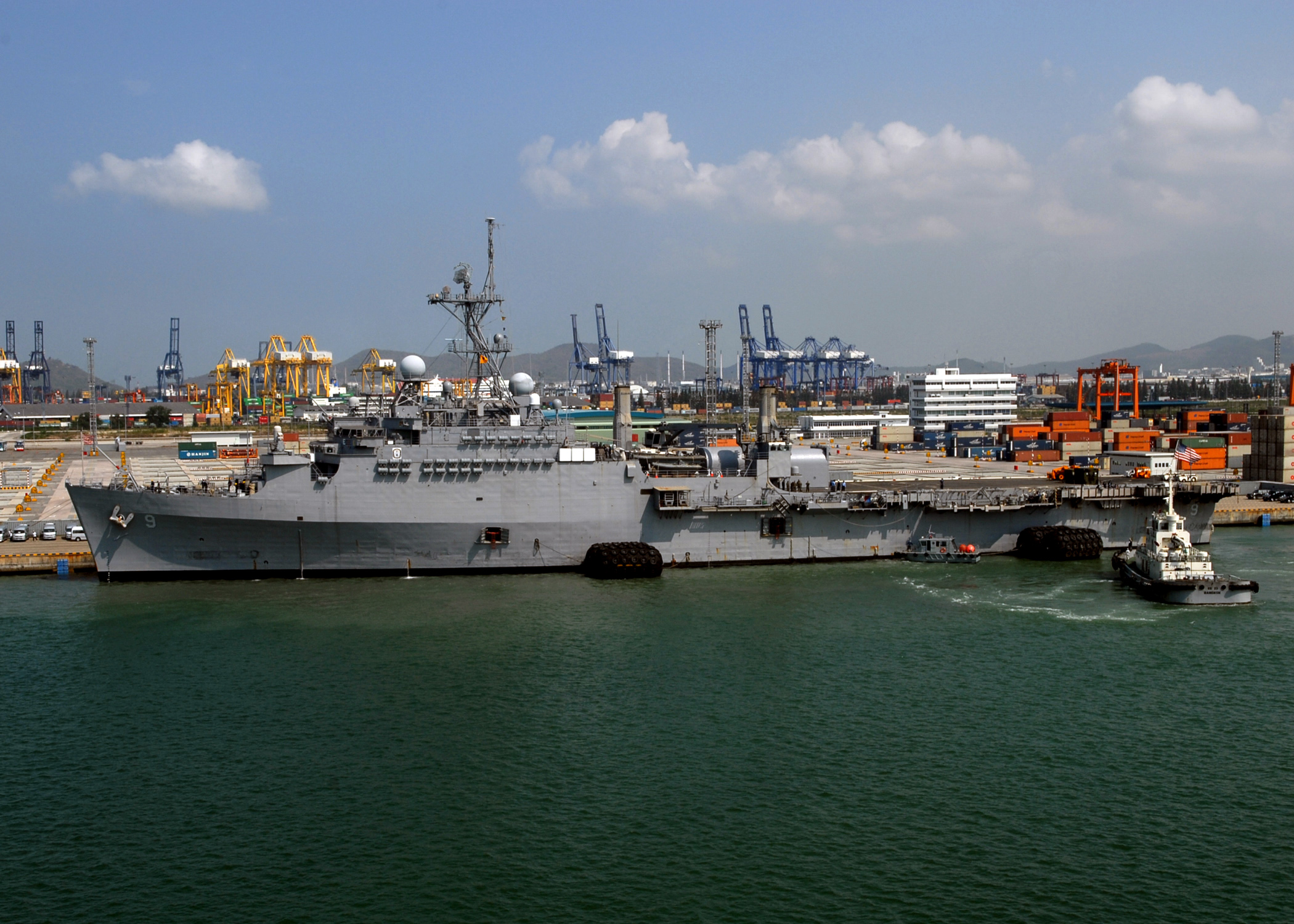
USS Denver (LPD-9) pulls into Laem Chabang Port for a scheduled port visit after completing Cobra Gold 2010

Laem Chabang is in eastern Thailand, on the Gulf of Thailand, and is the country's main deep sea port. It consists of several separate ports, and occupies 2,572 acres (10.41 km^{2}).

In FY2016 Laem Chabang had 6,312 vessel calls, up 0.11 percent over FY2015, to 72.3 million tons, down 1.5 percent. Cargo volume totalled seven million TEUs, up 4.2 percent.

=== Bangkok Port ===
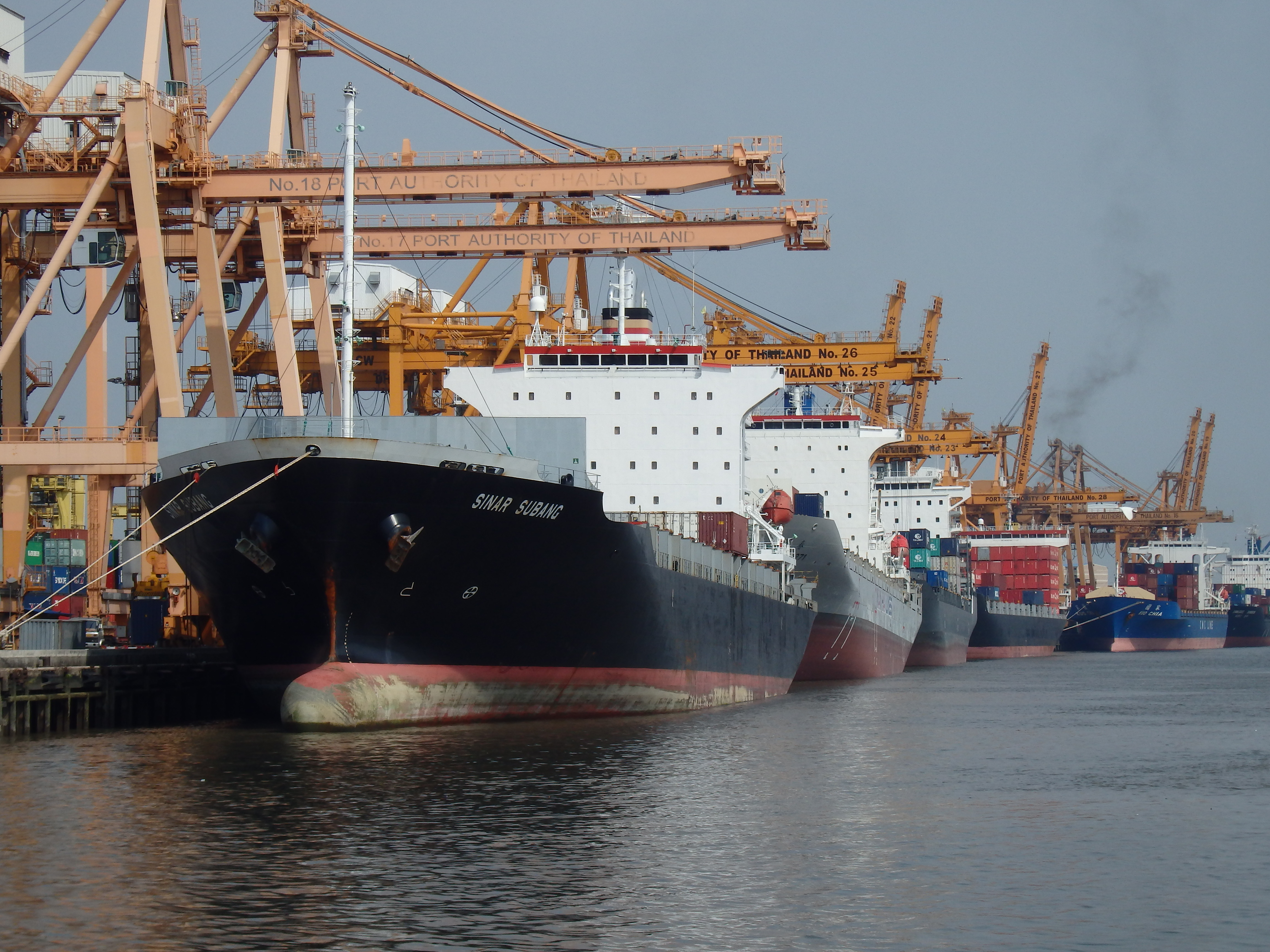
Sinar Subang cargo ship at Bangkok Port

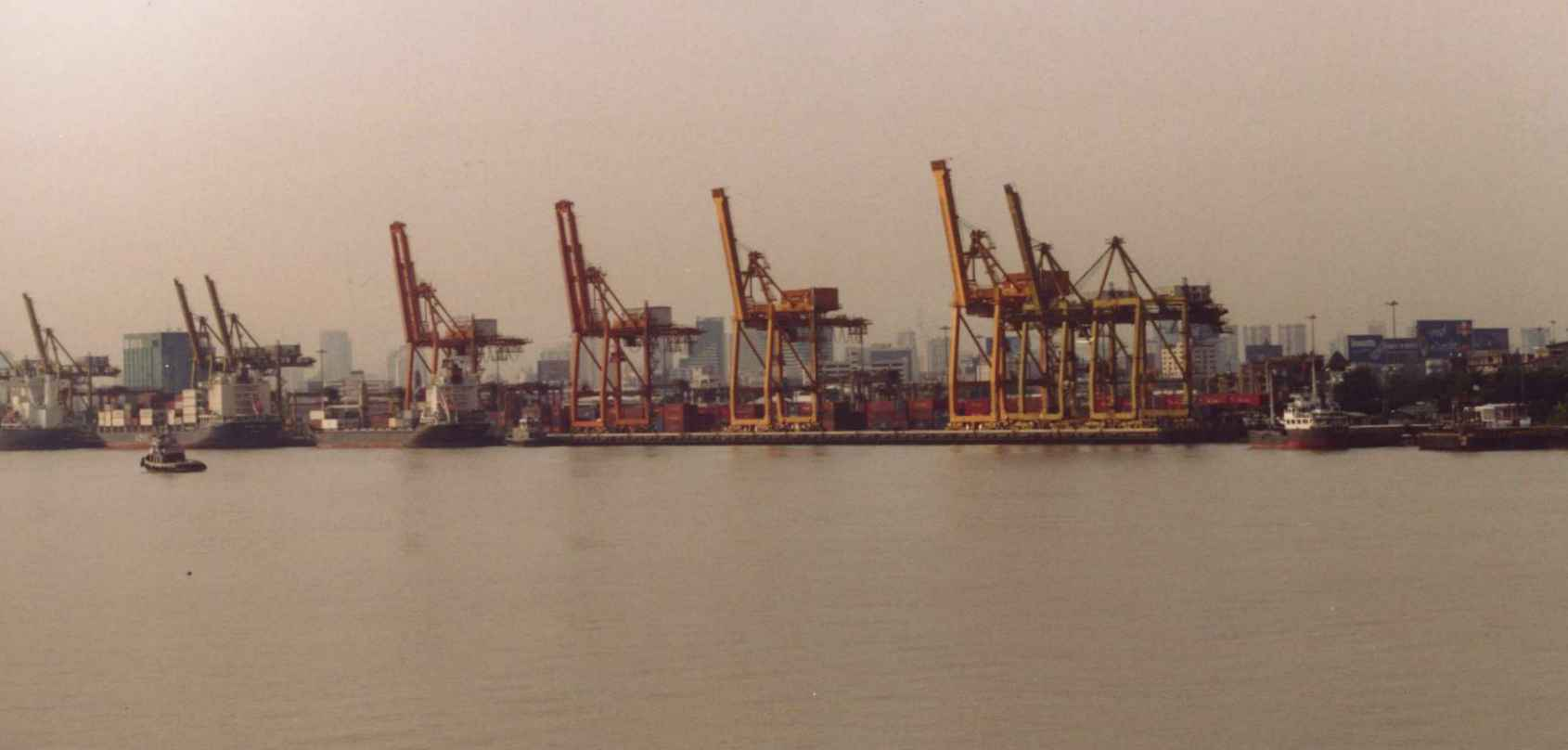
Cranes at Khlong Toei Harbor (Bangkok Port)

The Bangkok Port area is on the east side of the Chao Phraya River in Khlong Toei District occupying over 900 acres (3.6 km^{2}), with jurisdiction of 66 km of riverfront.

Bangkok Port had 3,067 vessel calls in FY2016, down 5.5 percent from FY2015. Cargo tonnage was 21 million, down 3.7 percent. Cargo volume totalled 1.5 million TEUs, down 3.4 percent. Full container loads (FCL) decreased to 82 percent, less container loads (LCL) accounted for 15 percent, and 2.7 percent of containers handled were empty. PAT attributes this to the sluggish worldwide economy.

=== Chiang Saen Port ===
Chiang Saen is on the Mekong River across from Laos in Chiang Rai Province in north Thailand. Its role as a trade connection with Myanmar, Laos, and the southern provinces of China is expanding and new facilities are being planned 10 km away at the Mae Nam Kok estuary of the Mekong River.

Chiang Sen had 3,485 vessel calls in FY2016, down 61.5 percent from FY2015. Cargo volume was 207,942 tons, down 50.2 percent.

=== Chiang Khong Port ===
Chiang Khong is a one-berth port on the Mekong River, across from Laos.

Chiang Khong hosted 942 vessel calls in FY2016, up 24 percent over FY2015. Total cargo volume was 84,874 tons, up 4.4 percent.

=== Ranong Port ===
Ranong is on the Kraburi River of the Kra Peninsula, across from Myanmar and near the Indian Ocean coast. Approved in 2003 as a PAT port, expansion is planned to serve the West Indian Ocean and Andaman Sea areas.

In FY2016, Ranong saw 346 vessel calls, up 9.8 percent over FY2015. Cargo volume was 167,864 tons, down 12.7 percent.

== See also ==
- Government of Thailand
- Transport in Thailand
- Port authority
- Port operator
- Port F.C.
