= Khlong Toei Nuea =

Khlong Toei Nuea คลองเตยเหนือ
- Khwaeng
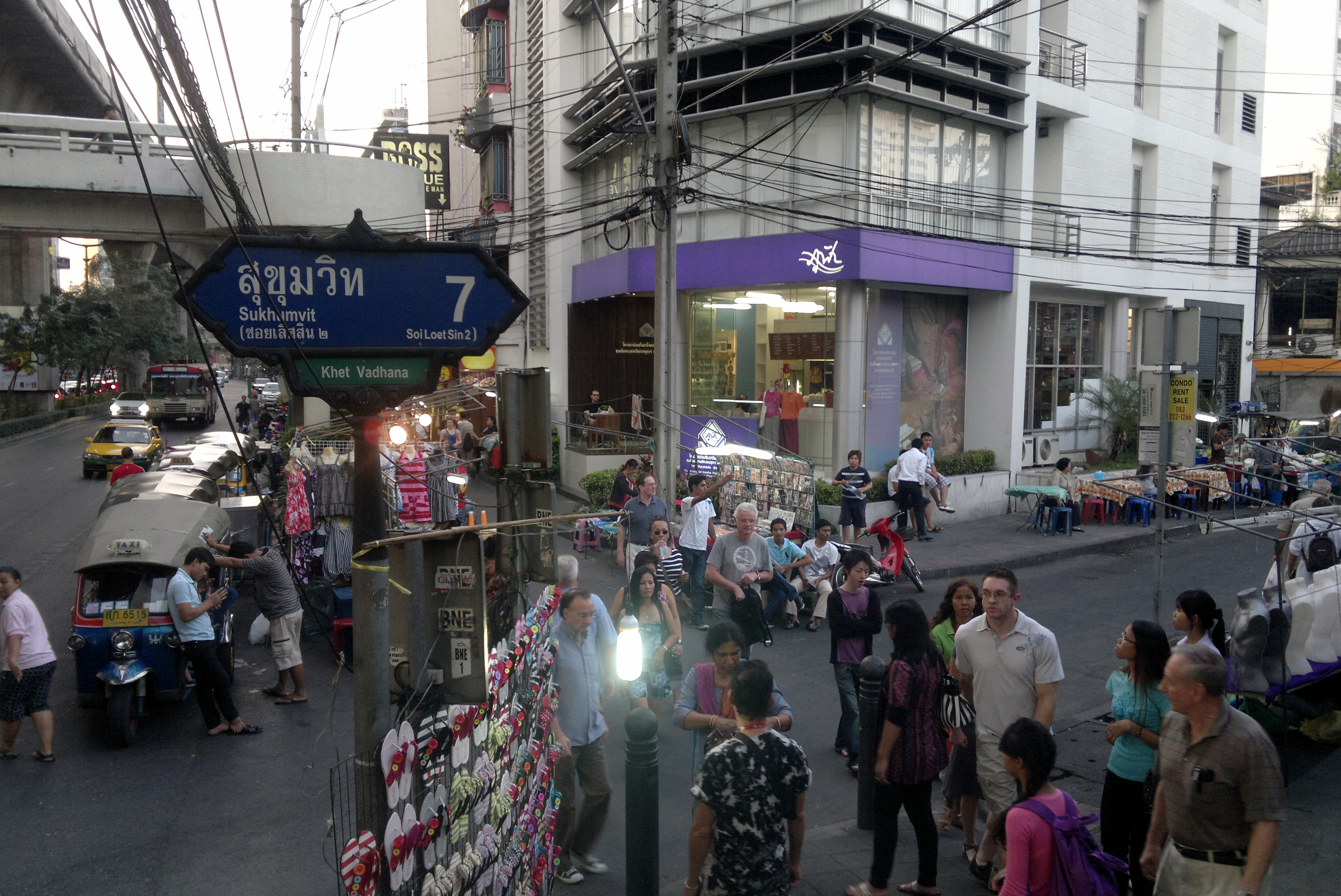
- Entrance of Soi Sukhumvit 7, Khlong Toei Nuea

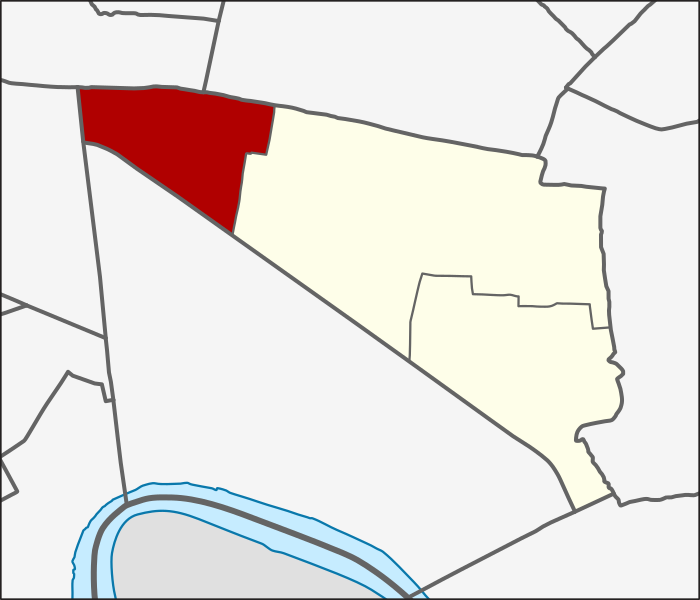
- Location in Watthana District
- Country: Thailand
- Province: Bangkok
- Khet: Watthana

Area
  - Total: 2.109 km^{2} (0.814 sq mi)

Population (2020)
  - Total: 9,313
- Time zone: UTC+7 (ICT)
- Postal code: 10110
- TIS 1099: 103901

Khlong Toei Nuea (Thai: คลองเตยเหนือ, pronounced [kʰlɔ̄ːŋ tɤ̄ːj nɯ̌a̯]) is a khwaeng (subdistrict) of Watthana District, in Bangkok, Thailand. In 2020, it had a total population of 9,313 people.
