= Khlong Toei Market =

Market in Bangkok, Thailand

Coordinates: 13°43′05″N 100°33′38″E

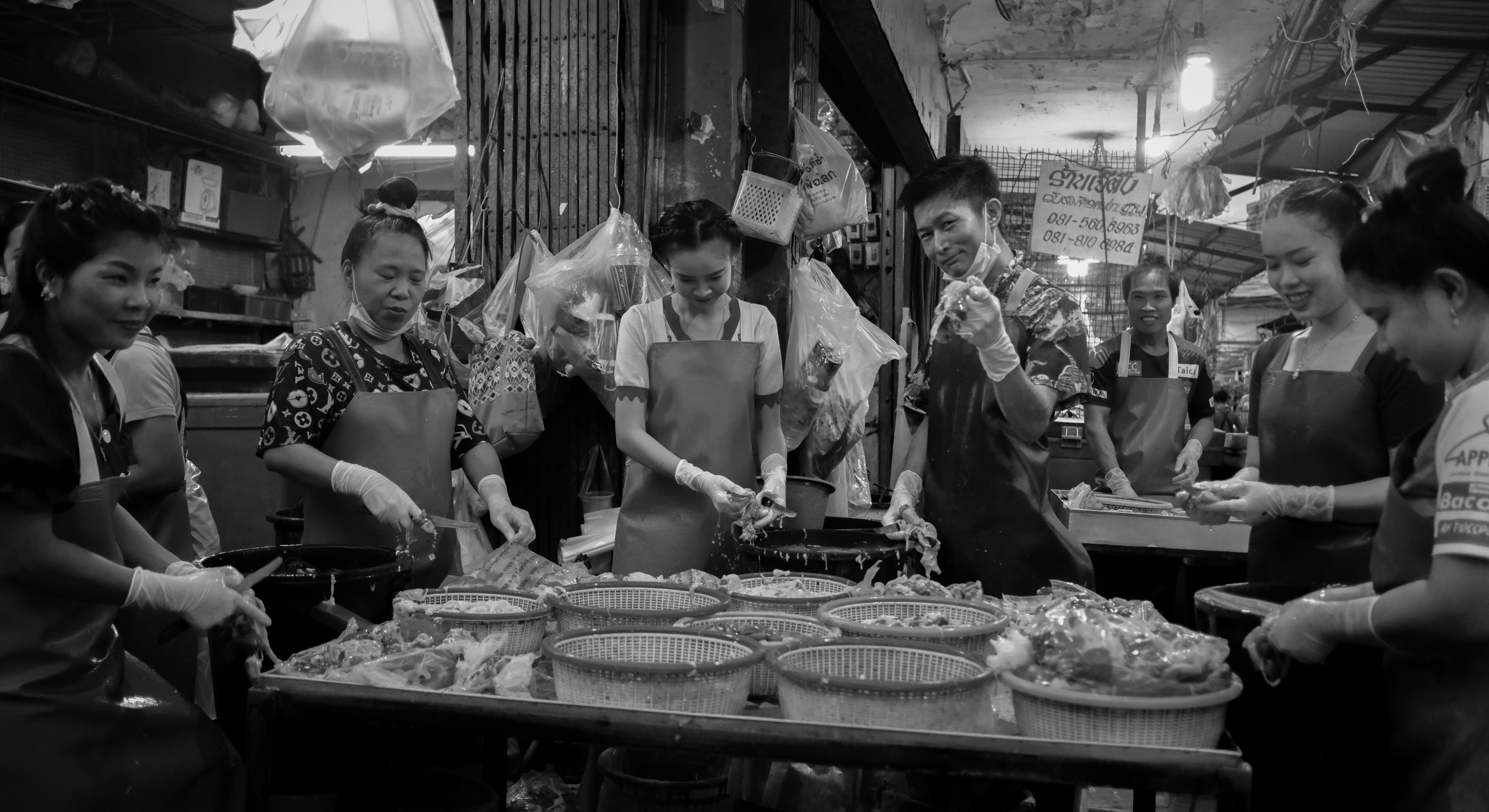
Workers cutting meat in Khlong Toei market

Khlong Toei Market (Thai: ตลาดคลองเตย, RTGS: Talat Khlong Toei, pronounced [tā.làːt kʰlɔ̄ːŋ tɤ̄ːj]) is Bangkok's biggest fresh market. It is located on Rama IV Road near the Khlong Toei and Queen Sirikit National Convention Centre MRT stations in the Khlong Toei neighborhood. The market offers low prices on raw meat, seafood, farm produce, and a few other items (clothing, kitchenware, etc.) and is open daily from 6.00 am – 2.00 am. In January 2010 CNN listed it as one of the most authentic markets in Bangkok as well as a place to avoid when hung over.
