= List of districts of Bangkok =

Bangkok is subdivided into 50 districts (khet, เขต, pronounced [kʰèːt], also sometimes wrongly called amphoe as in the other provinces, derived from Pali khetta, cognate to the Sanskrit term kṣetra), which are further subdivided into 180 subdistricts (khwaeng, แขวง, pronounced [kʰwɛ̌ːŋ]), roughly equivalent to tambon in the other provinces.

Clickable map showing the 50 districts of Bangkok

District (Khet)	Map Number	Postal code	Thai Name	Popu- lation	Number of Subdistricts (Khwaeng)	Latitude	Longitude
Bang Bon	50	10150	บางบอน	105,161	4	13.6592	100.3991
Bang Kapi	6	10240	บางกะปิ	148,465	2	13.765833	100.647778
Bang Khae	40	10160	บางแค	191,781	4	13.696111	100.409444
Bang Khen	5	10220	บางเขน	189,539	2	13.873889	100.596389
Bang Kho Laem	31	10120	บางคอแหลม	94,956	3	13.693333	100.5025
Bang Khun Thian	21	10150	บางขุนเทียน	165,491	2	13.660833	100.435833
Bang Na	47	10260	บางนา	95,912	2	13.680081	100.5918
Bang Phlat	25	10700	บางพลัด	99,273	4	13.793889	100.505
Bang Rak	4	10500	บางรัก	45,875	5	13.730833	100.524167
Bang Sue	29	10800	บางซื่อ	132,234	2	13.809722	100.537222
Bangkok Noi	20	10700	บางกอกน้อย	117,793	5	13.770867	100.467933
Bangkok Yai	16	10600	บางกอกใหญ่	72,321	2	13.722778	100.476389
Bueng Kum	27	10240	บึงกุ่ม	145,830	3	13.785278	100.669167
Chatuchak	30	10900	จตุจักร	160,906	5	13.828611	100.559722
Chom Thong	35	10150	จอมทอง	158,005	4	13.677222	100.484722
Din Daeng	26	10400	ดินแดง	130,220	2	13.769722	100.552778
Don Mueang	36	10210	ดอนเมือง	166,261	3	13.913611	100.589722
Dusit	2	10300	ดุสิต	107,655	5	13.776944	100.520556
Huai Khwang	17	10310	ห้วยขวาง	78,175	3	13.776667	100.579444
Khan Na Yao	43	10230	คันนายาว	88,678	2	13.8271	100.6743
Khlong Sam Wa	46	10510	คลองสามวา	169,489	5	13.859722	100.704167
Khlong San	18	10600	คลองสาน	76,446	4	13.730278	100.509722
Khlong Toei	33	10110	คลองเตย	109,041	3	13.708056	100.583889
Lak Si	41	10210	หลักสี่	109,770	2	13.8875	100.578889
Lat Krabang	11	10520	ลาดกระบัง	163,175	6	13.722317	100.759669
Lat Phrao	38	10230	ลาดพร้าว	122,182	2	13.803611	100.6075
Min Buri	10	10510	มีนบุรี	137,251	2	13.813889	100.748056
Nong Chok	3	10530	หนองจอก	157,138	8	13.855556	100.8625
Nong Khaem	23	10160	หนองแขม	150,218	2	13.704722	100.348889
Pathum Wan	7	10330	ปทุมวัน	53,263	4	13.744942	100.5222
Phasi Charoen	22	10160	ภาษีเจริญ	129,827	7	13.714722	100.437222
Phaya Thai	14	10400	พญาไท	72,952	2	13.78	100.542778
Phra Khanong	9	10260	พระโขนง	93,482	2	13.702222	100.601667
Phra Nakhon	1	10200	พระนคร	57,876	12	13.764444	100.499167
Pom Prap Sattru Phai	8	10100	ป้อมปราบศัตรูพ่าย	51,006	5	13.758056	100.513056
Prawet	32	10250	ประเวศ	160,671	3	13.716944	100.694444
Rat Burana	24	10140	ราษฏร์บูรณะ	86,695	2	13.682222	100.505556
Ratchathewi	37	10400	ราชเทวี	73,035	4	13.758889	100.534444
Sai Mai	42	10220	สายไหม	188,123	3	13.919167	100.645833
Samphanthawong	13	10100	สัมพันธวงศ์	27,452	3	13.731389	100.514167
Saphan Sung	44	10240	สะพานสูง	89,825	3	13.77	100.684722
Sathon	28	10120	สาทร	84,916	3	13.708056	100.526389
Suan Luang	34	10250	สวนหลวง	115,658	3	13.730278	100.651389
Taling Chan	19	10170	ตลิ่งชัน	106,604	6	13.776944	100.456667
Thawi Watthana	48	10170	ทวีวัฒนา	76,351	2	13.7878	100.3638
Thon Buri	15	10600	ธนบุรี	119,708	7	13.725	100.485833
Thung Khru	49	10140	ทุ่งครุ	116,473	2	13.6472	100.4958
Wang Thonglang	45	10310	วังทองหลาง	114,768	4	13.7864	100.6087
Watthana	39	10110	วัฒนา	81,623	3	13.742222	100.585833
Yan Nawa	12	10120	ยานนาวา	81,521	2	13.696944	100.543056

Districts and Sub-districts of Bangkok

== See also ==
- Administrative divisions of Thailand
