= Khlong Toei district =

Khlong Toei คลองเตย
- Khet
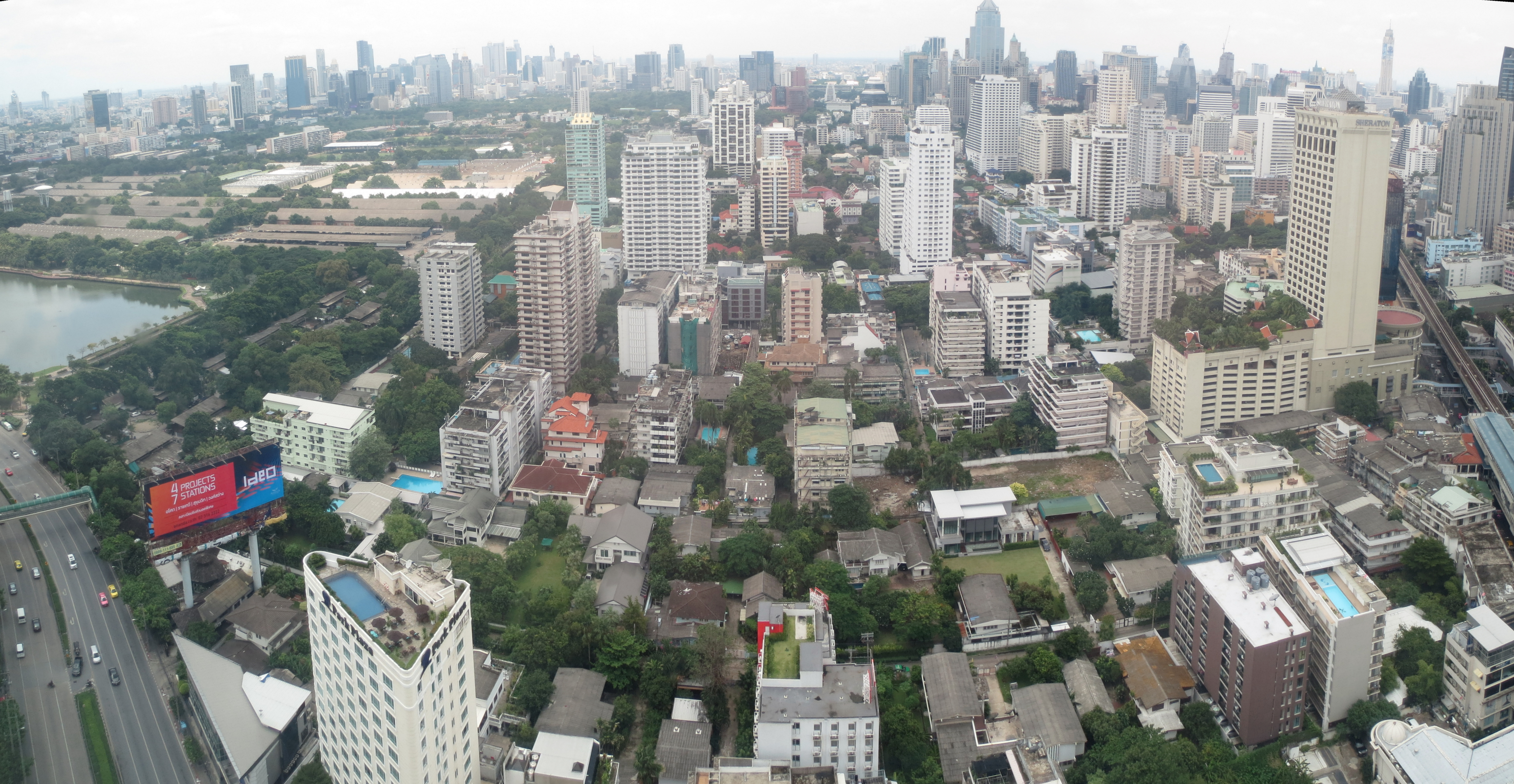
- View of Khlong Toei from Asok intersection toward Nana

- Khet location in Bangkok
- Coordinates: 13°42′29″N 100°35′2″E
- Country: Thailand
- Province: Bangkok
- Seat: Khlong Toei
- Khwaeng: 3
- Khet established: 9 November 1989

Area
  - Total: 13.0 km^{2} (5.0 sq mi)

Population (2017)
  - Total: 102,945
  - Density: 7,918.84/km^{2} (20,509.7/sq mi)
- Time zone: UTC+7 (ICT)
- Postal code: 10110 except parts of Phra Khanong: 10260
- Geocode: 1033

Khlong Toei (also Klong Toey, Thai: คลองเตย, pronounced [kʰlɔ̄ːŋ tɤ̄ːj]) is a district in central Bangkok, Thailand. It is bordered by the Chao Phraya River and contains major port facilities. Known for its slum, it is also the site of a major market, the Khlong Toei Market.

Neighboring districts are (clockwise from the north): Watthana, Phra Khanong, Phra Pradaeng district of Samut Prakan province (across the Chao Phraya), Yan Nawa, Sathon, and Pathum Wan.

== History ==
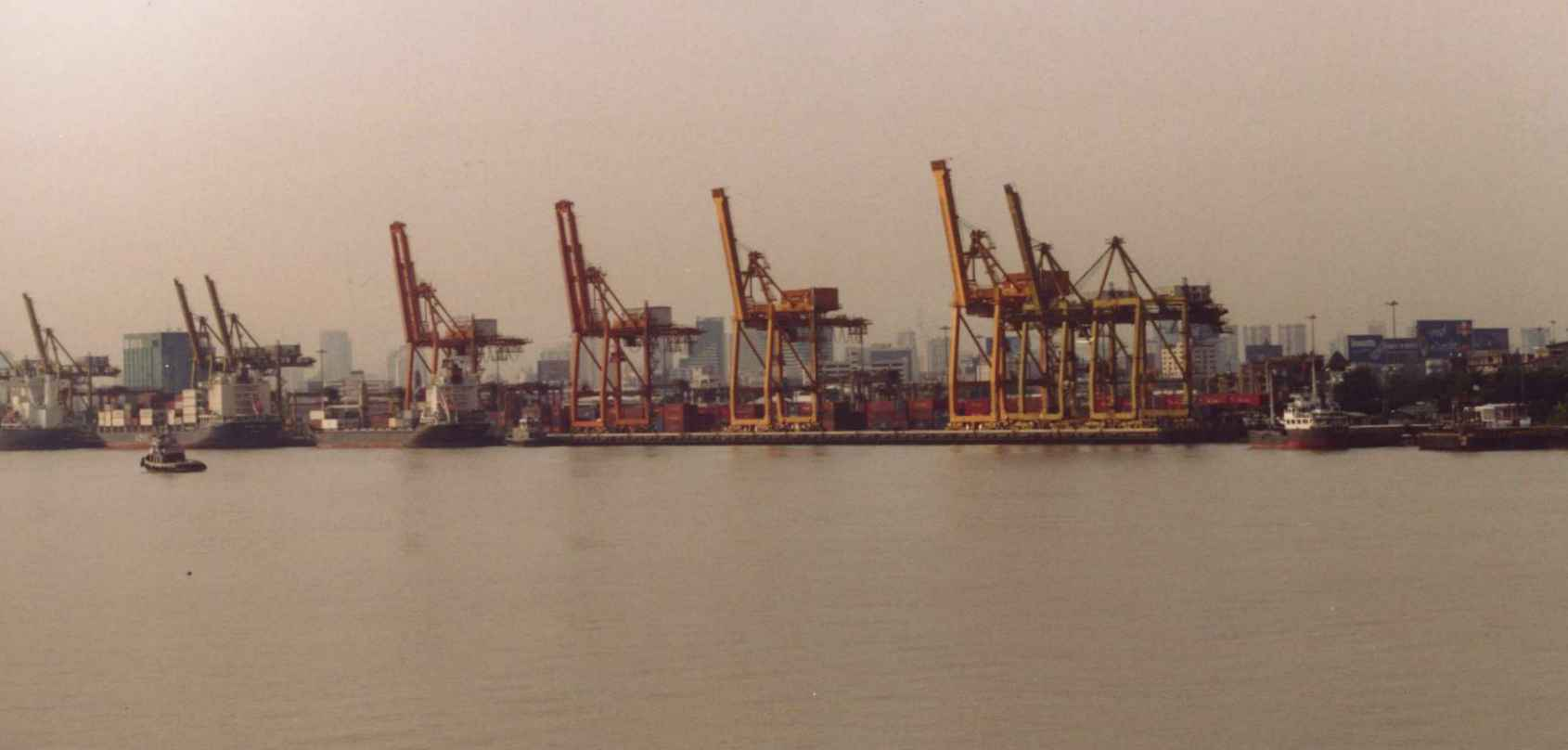
Cranes at Khlong Toei harbor

The area has a history dating back to the ninth century as a port to cities upstream along the Chao Phraya River, such as Pak Nam Phra Pradaeng (Thai: เมืองปากน้ำพระประแดง) (as opposed to the current Phra Pradaeng district) built during the King Phutthayotfa Chulalok period.

Khlong Thanon Trong (Thai: คลองถนนตรง) was a khlong (canal) and a parallel road built by King Mongkut around 1857. Later, different sections of the canal became known as Khlong Toei and Khlong Hua Lamphong. Khlong Toei means 'the canal of pandan', as the plant grew along the southern bank of the canal. The road was renamed Rama IV Road by King Vajiravudh in 1919. In 1947, a large portion of Khlong Toei canal was filled to expand the Rama IV Road surface.

The area was once part of the Phra Khanong district, but on 9 November 1989 it was separated to form the new Khlong Toei District. Originally Khlong Toei consisted of six sub-districts, three of which later formed the new Watthana district (announced on 14 October 1997, effective 6 March 1998).

The squatted informal settlement was surveyed in 1971 and is one of the largest slums in Bangkok. In 2006, it was estimated that between 80,000 and 100,000 people live there.

== Administration ==
District map

The district is divided into three subdistricts (khwaeng). From west to east, these are:

1.	Khlong Toei	คลองเตย	from the railway to Soi Sukhumvit 22
2.	Khlong Tan	คลองตัน	from Soi Sukhumvit 22 to Soi Sukhumvit 36
3.	Phra Khanong	พระโขนง	from Soi Sukhumvit 36 to Soi Sukhumvit 52

Khlong Toei is both the name of a subdistrict and the district in which it lies. Phra Khanong is both a subdistrict of Khlong Toei and a district on its own, with only subdistrict Bang Chak. Furthermore, all three subdistricts listed above have counterparts with the addition of "nuea" (north) in Watthana District.

== Port ==
Khlong Toei Port, also known as Bangkok Port, was formerly Thailand's only major port for sea transportation of cargo. Its construction began in 1938 and finished after World War II. The port is on the Chao Phraya River, not far from the Gulf of Thailand. Due to its limited capacity and traffic problems caused by semi-trailer trucks, many of its operations have moved to Laem Chabang Port in Chonburi province since its opening in July 1981.

== Places of interest ==
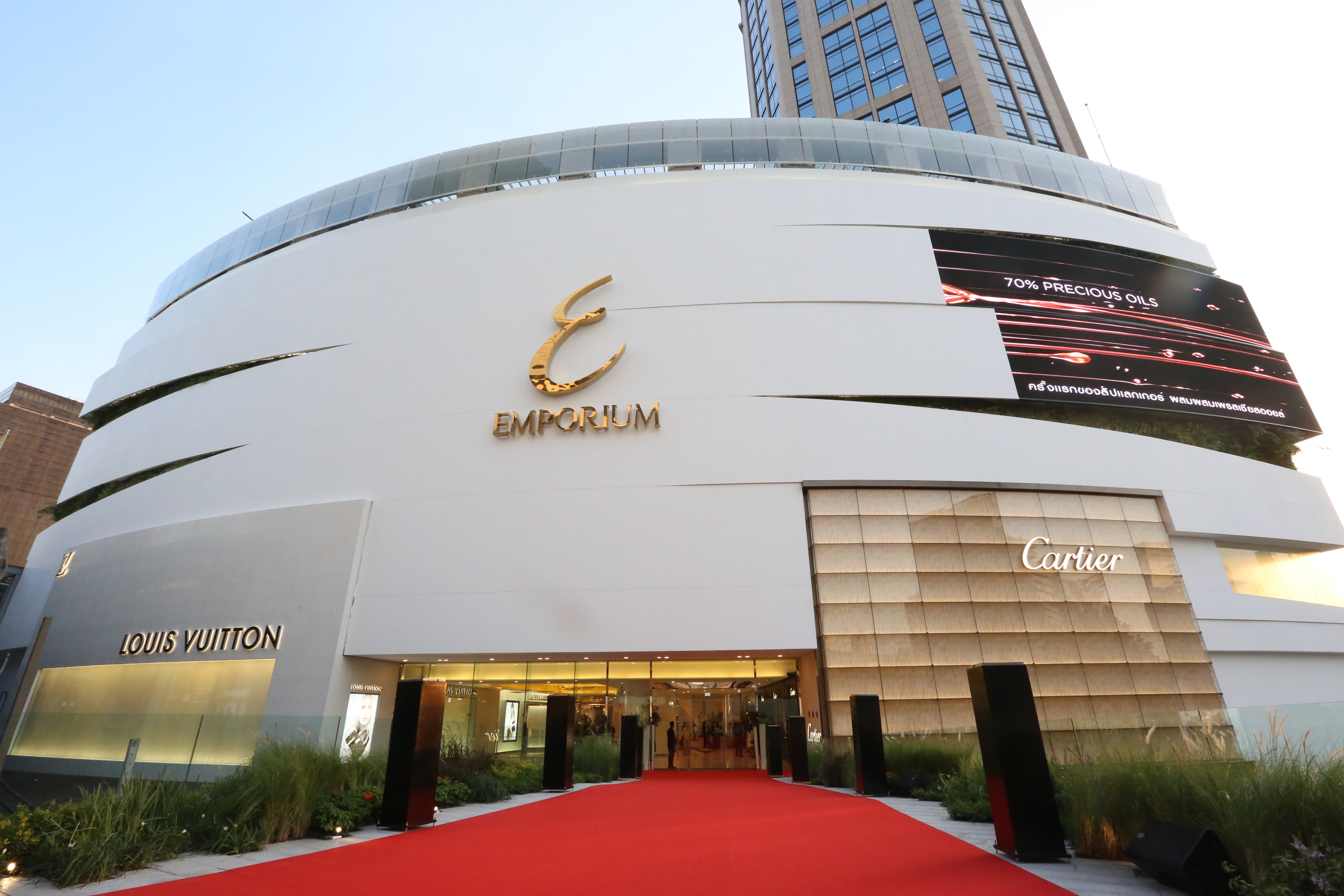
The Emporium

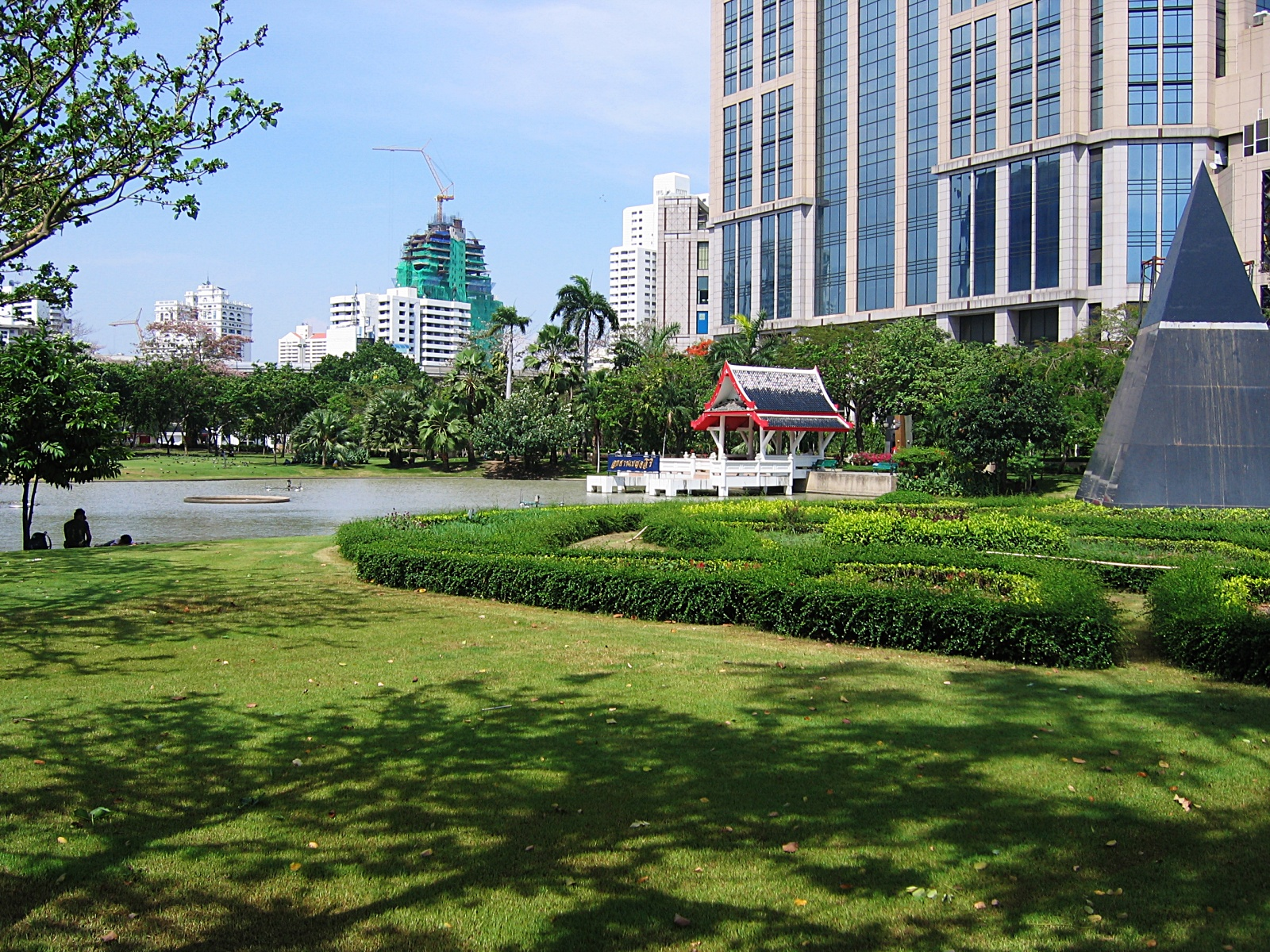
Benjasiri Park

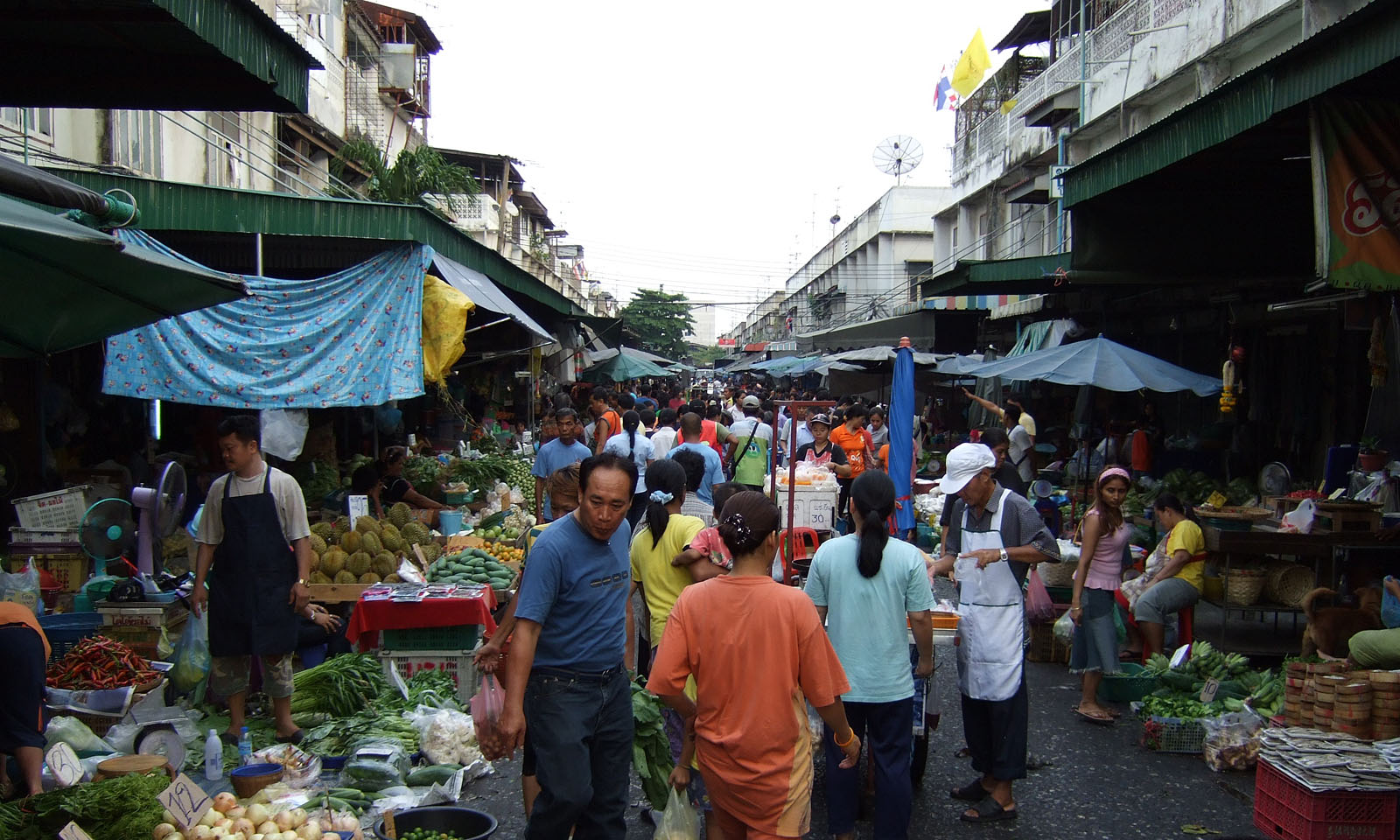
Klong Toei Market

- Bangkok Planetarium
- Science Center for Education
- Tamnak Plai Noen, the historic residence of Prince Naris, now converted into a small museum.
- Emporium, EmQuartier and EmSphere; luxury shopping malls.
- Nana Plaza, a major adult entertainment center, known for prostitution and go-go and hostess bars.
- Queen Sirikit National Convention Center, served by the MRT station of the same name, hosts various exhibitions around the year.
- Benjakitti Park, a public park next to the convention center. It includes a lake and is on land that was formerly occupied by the Tobacco Monopoly, the government's tobacco factory.
- Benjasiri Park, a public park created to commemorate Her Majesty Queen Sirikit's 60th birthday. It is next to the Emporium.
- Khlong Toei Market, Bangkok's largest wet market.
- The Khlong Toei slum, south of the expressway and north of the port, is the largest and oldest slum of Bangkok. It houses some 100,000 people on about one square mile (260 ha) of land owned by the Port Authority.
- Metropolitan Electricity Authority
- The Customs Department
- PAT Stadium off Sunthon Kosa Road.
- Port Authority of Thailand and Bangkok Port
- Ekkamai Bus Terminal
- Tobacco Authority of Thailand (Formerly known as Thailand Tobacco Monopoly)

The following places of interest were formerly in Khlong Toei District:

- Lumpinee Boxing Stadium, an indoor Muay Thai arena, now moved to Ram Inthra Road, Bang Khen District.
- Suan Lum Night Bazaar, closed due to contract expiry, now moved to Suan Lum Night Bazaar Ratchadaphisek.
- Stock Exchange of Thailand Building. Now the office is moved to Din Daeng district.

== Diplomatic missions ==
- Embassy of Chile
- Embassy of Cuba
- Embassy of the Philippines
- Embassy of Romania
- Embassy of Spain
- Embassy of Sudan

== Transportation ==
- BTS skytrain (BTS) stations in the district include Nana, Asok (with interchange to MRT Sukhumvit station), Phrom Phong, Thong Lo, Ekkamai, Phra Khanong, and On Nut, respectively, all of which are located along Sukhumvit Road on the BTS Sukhumvit Line.
- MRT (MRTA) has stations Khlong Toei, Queen Sirikit National Convention Center and Sukhumvit (interchange to BTS).
- Eastern Bus Terminal (also called Ekkamai Bus Terminal) has intercity buses to destinations such as Pattaya, Rayong and Trat. It is on Sukhumvit Road, near the Ekkamai BTS station.

== Economy ==
- The head office of Asia Atlantic Airlines is on the 11th floor of the Times Square Building in Khlong Toei District.
- The State Railway of Thailand (SRT) is a large landowner in Thailand. Its latest property development scheme is the Chao Phraya Gateway project, a mix of hotels, shopping centers, and condominiums. It capitalizes on SRT's 277 rai, 1.16 kilometer-long stretch of land on the river in the Khlong Toei District. The SRT hopes the project will help clear its 100 billion baht debt. The project is projected to break even within eight years and deliver profits of 140 billion baht. As of April 2019, SRT's plans are being submitted to the Transport Ministry for approval.

== Education ==
The Sacred Heart Convent School is in Khlong Toei and NIST Inter National School is located on Soi Sukhumvit 15, Klongtoey-nua
