= APAC Tower =

Mixed-use office and retail complex in Bangkok, Thailand

- เอแพค ทาวเวอร์
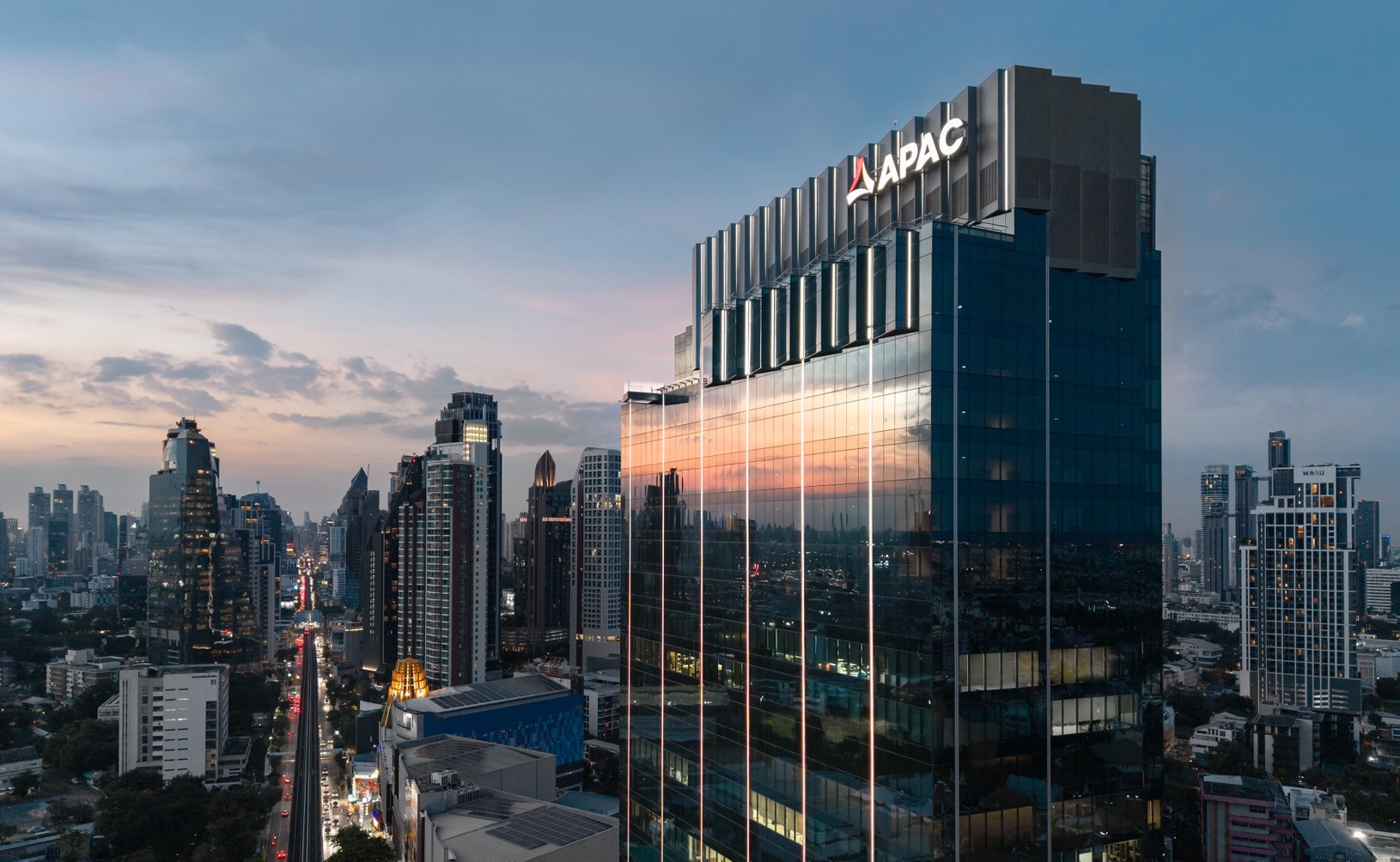
- APAC Tower, Sukhumvit 63 Road, Bangkok
- Interactive map of the APAC Tower area

General information
- Status: Completed
- Type: Mixed-use development
- Location: 1319 Sukhumvit Road, 1319 Sukhumvit Rd, North, Prakanong, Bangkok 10110, Bangkok, Thailand
- Coordinates: 13°43′13.0″N 100°35′05.3″E
- Completed: 2025

Technical details
- Floor count: 32
- Floor area: 70,000 sq.m.

Design and construction
- Architect: Design 103 International Ltd...
- Developer: APAC Land Co., Ltd.

Other information
- Public transit: Ekkamai BTS Station

Website
- APAC Tower

APAC Tower is a mixed-use complex (office and retail) located at the intersection of Sukhumvit Road and Ekkamai Road in Watthana District, Bangkok, Thailand. Developed by APAC Land, the project was completed in 2025 and has approximately 35,000 square meters of lettable space, including office areas and a retail section called Ekkamai Corner. In 2025, APAC Tower received Fitwel 3-Star certification, the highest rating under the Fitwel system. It also received LEED Gold certification from US Green Building Council.

== History ==
The site of APAC Tower was previously occupied by a Ban-Rai coffee shop and a Sukhumvit Honda showroom before being redeveloped into the current mixed-use complex. The project was designed by Design 103 International, reflecting contemporary trends in sustainable and wellness-focused architecture. Planning began in the early 2020s, and construction was completed in 2025.

== Location and transportation ==
APAC Tower is situated at the corner of Sukhumvit Road and Ekkamai Road, opposite Bangkok Eastern Bus Terminal, Science Centre for Education, and Bangkok Planetarium, with access to the Ekkamai BTS station.

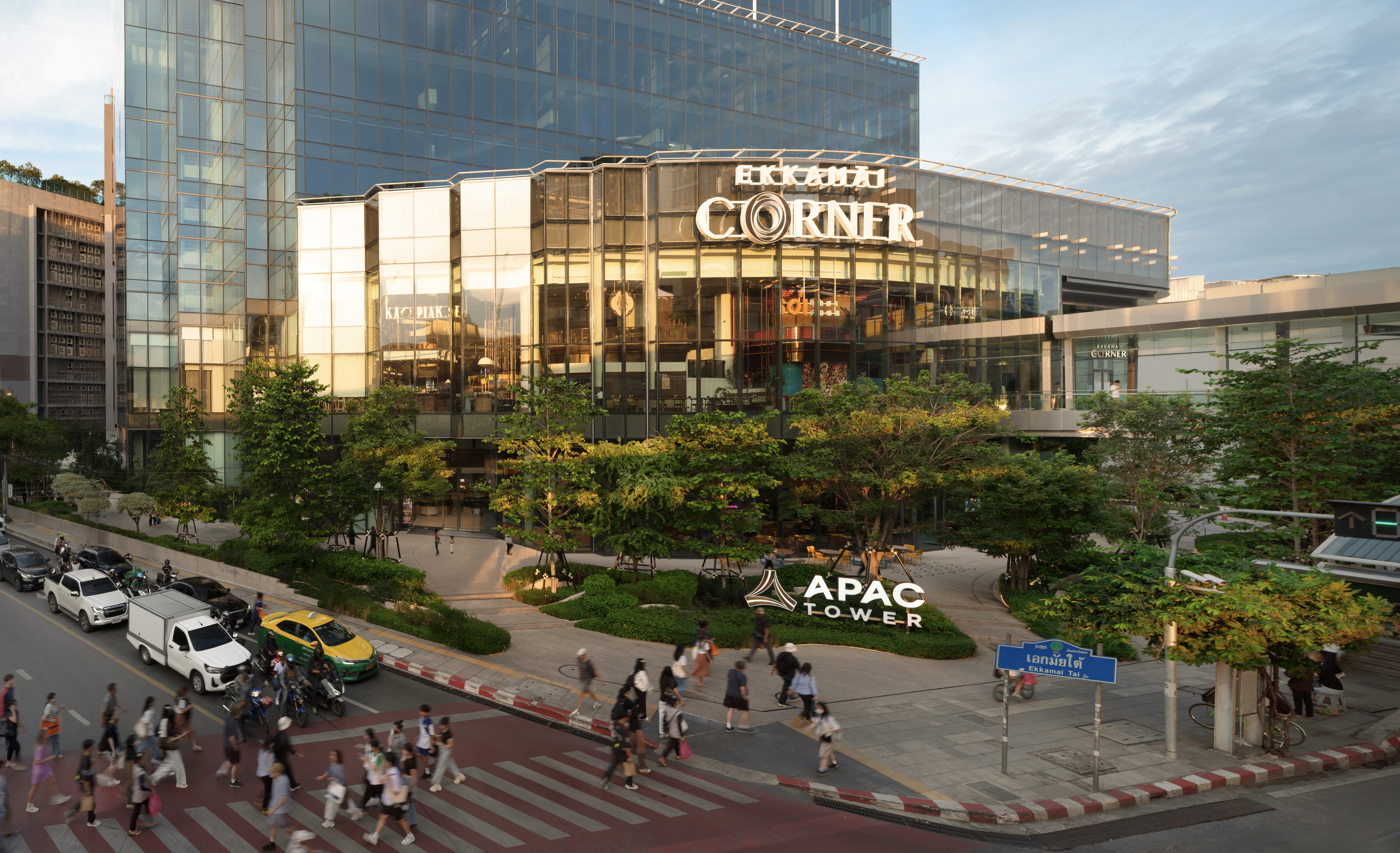
Ekkamai Tai Junction (แยกเอกมัยใต้), looking north along Ekkamai Road with APAC Tower at the corner

== Ekkamai Corner ==
Ekkamai Corner is the retail section of APAC Tower, which includes food and beverage outlets such as Kao Piak Sen, Tonkatsu Aoki, Somsak, and Pralet BKK.

== Tenants ==
The building houses notable office tenants such as Mazda, TOA Corporation, Asia Pulp & Paper, and ZIM.

== Awards ==
APAC Tower has received recognition from several industry organizations, including the Fitwel Best in Healthy building Awards, the Thailand Property Awards (Best Office Development), and the Asia Pacific Property Awards.

== See also ==
- List of tallest buildings in Bangkok
