= Kluaynamthai =

Coordinates: 13.712925°N 100.584033°E

Kluaynamthai, also Kluai Nam Thai, (Thai: กล้วยน้ำไท, pronounced [klûaj náːm tʰa]), is the name of the area surrounding Soi Sukhumvit 42 (ซอยสุขุมวิท 42) in Bangkok, and an unofficial name of the soi (side-street) itself.

Kluaynamthai is an alley of inbound Sukhumvit Road in the Phra Khanong Sub-district, Khlong Toei District sandwiched by Ekkamai BTS station (E7) and Japanese style shopping mall, Gateway Ekamai in Ekkamai area, and is a shortcut to Rama IV Road in the area close to Khlong Toei Port.

Kluaynamthai Road runs from the Sukhumvit side up till cuts through Rama IV Road at the Kluai Nam Thai Intersection. It continued to run in an extension called "Kluai Nam Thai Tat Mai Road" (ถนนกล้วยน้ำไทตัดใหม่) near Khlong Toei District Office, as far as the end when it merged with At Narong Road at the At Narong Intersection under the Chalong Rat Expressway (Ram Inthra–At Narong route) in the area of Khlong Toei Sub-district, Khlong Toei District.

The only portion that is a shortcut between Sukhumvit and Rama IX is one-way road.

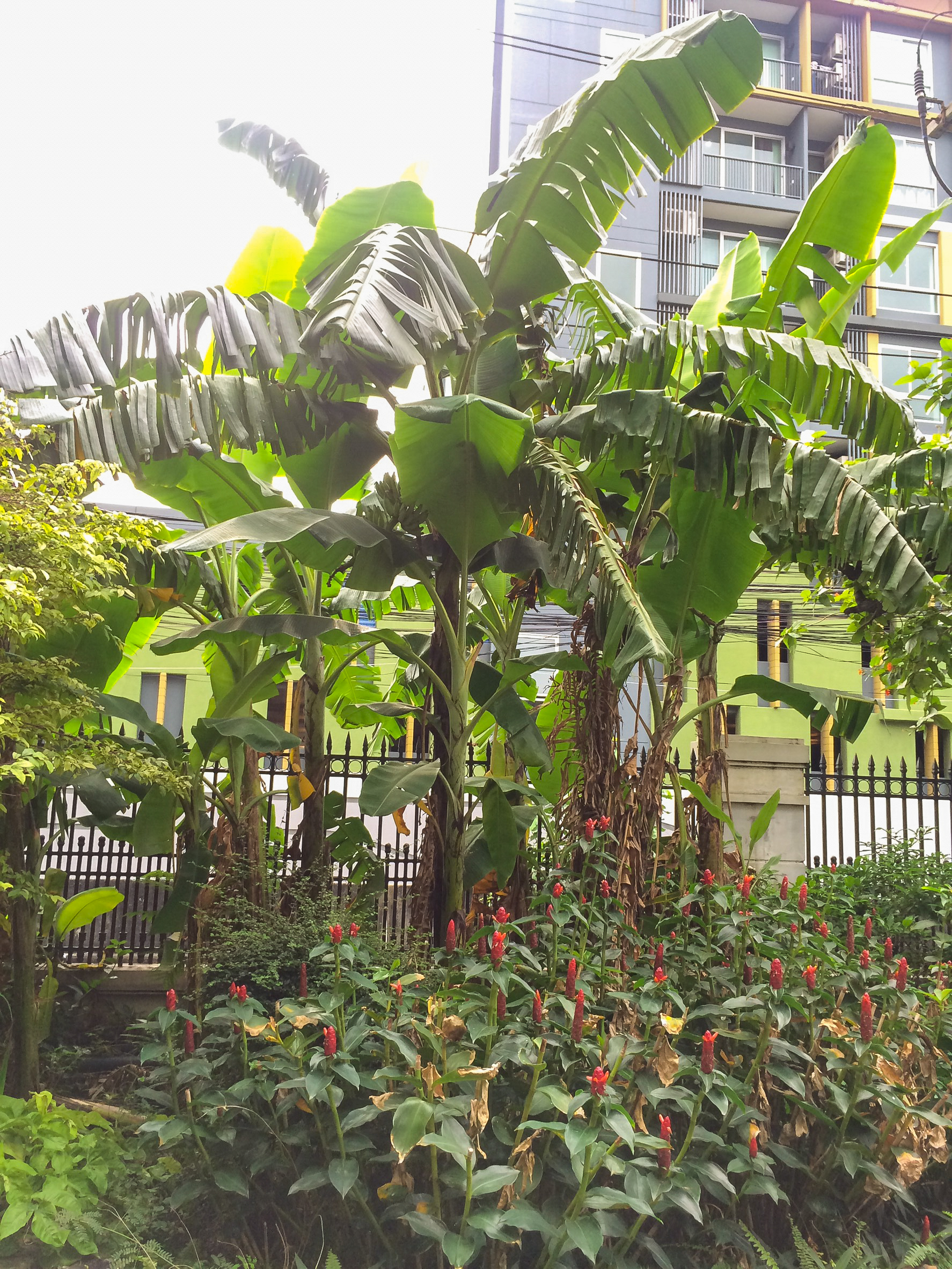
Specimens of Kluaynamthai an eponymous that grown at Bangkok University

The reason why it is called "Kluai Nam Thai", because it used to be a place for cultivating a small native banana variety called "Kluai Nam Thai". Along the lines of Sukhumvit Road prior World War II was considered a semi-rural area up till Bang Na, and most of the land was occupied by the naval officers, such as Soi Thong Lo (Soi Sukhumvit 55), Soi Klang (Soi Sukhumvit 49), etc.

Currently, specimens of this banana variety are still being planted for conservation at Bangkok University (City Campus), formerly and still colloquially known as "Kluaynamthai Campus", the first campus of this tertiary institution established in 1962 (in fact, it is located on nearby Soi Ban Kluai Tai or Soi Sukhumvit 40, collectively called "Kluai Nam Thai", there are four sois that connect to each other, namely Soi Saman Chan–Soi Barbos 2, and Soi Saeng Chan–Soi Rubia).

Kluaynamthai Hospital, a private hospital is also located in the neighbourhood.

Kluaynamthai is considered a comfortable area to live because it is surrounded by utilities, such as condominiums, residences, schools, restaurants, shopping malls, as well as the convenience of traveling.

== See more ==
- List of neighbourhoods in Bangkok
