= Khlong Tan Nuea =

Khlong Tan Nuea คลองตันเหนือ
- Khwaeng
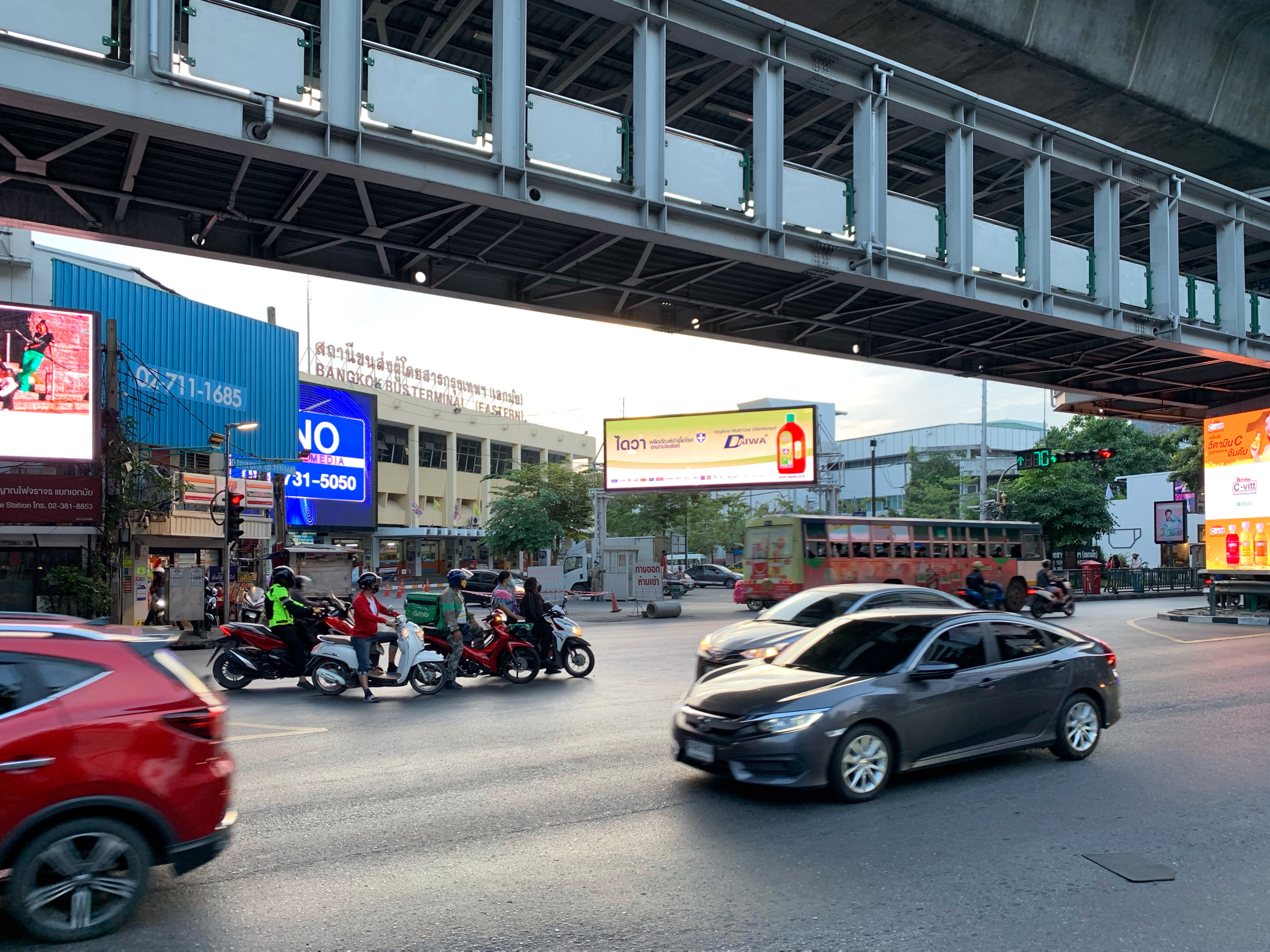
- Ekkamai Tai Junction, where Ekkamai meets Sukhumvit Roads opposite Bangkok Eastern Bus Terminal, Ekkamai Road (Soi Sukhumvit 63) formed a boundary between Khlong Tan Nuea and Phra Khanong Nuea

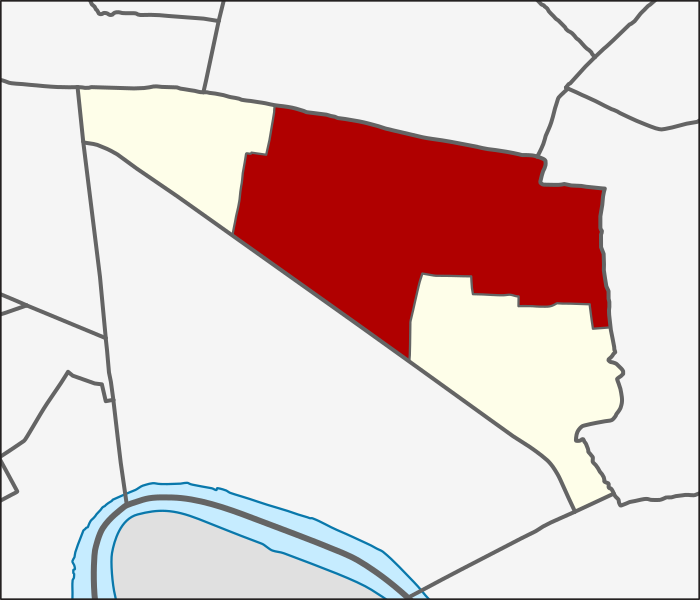
- Location in Watthana District
- Country: Thailand
- Province: Bangkok
- Khet: Watthana
- Named for: Khlong Tan

Area
  - Total: 7.031 km^{2} (2.715 sq mi)

Population (2020)
  - Total: 49,971
- Time zone: UTC+7 (ICT)
- Postal code: 10110
- TIS 1099: 103902

Khlong Tan Nuea (Thai: คลองตันเหนือ, pronounced [kʰlɔ̄ːŋ tān nɯ̌a̯]) is a khwaeng (subdistrict) of Watthana District, in Bangkok, Thailand. In 2020, it had a total population of 49,971 people.

== Toponymy ==
Its name means "North Khlong Tan", according to its direction. Khlong Tan is a tributary on the left side of Khlong Saen Saep, the longest khlong (canal) in Thailand was excavated in the early Rattanakosin period around the reign of King Rama III that flows through this vicinity.

Khlong Saen Saep confluence Khlong Tan in the area like a three way junction. Hence, this vicinity was called Khlong Tan as well.
