= Ekkamai BTS station =

Ekkamai เอกมัย
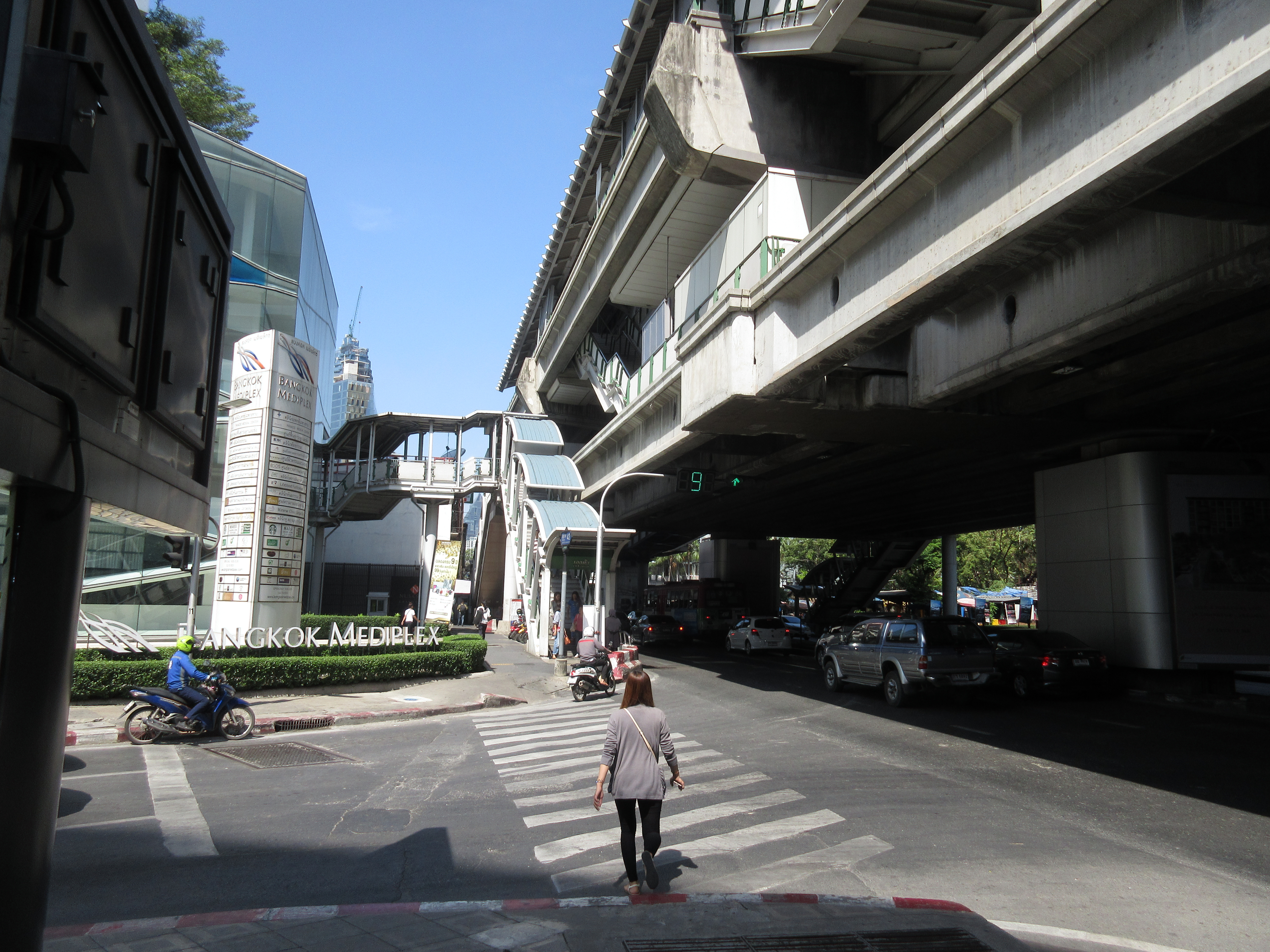
- Entry of the station as seen from Soi Sukhumvit 42 (Soi Kluai Nam Thai) in Khlong Toei District

General information
- Location: Watthana and Phra Khanong, Khlong Toei; Bangkok; Thailand
- Coordinates: 13°43′10.41″N 100°35′6.63″E
- System: BTS
- Owner: Bangkok Metropolitan Administration (BMA); BTS Rail Mass Transit Growth Infrastructure Fund (BTSGIF)
- Operator: Bangkok Mass Transit System; Public Company Limited (BTSC)
- Line: Sukhumvit Line
- Connections: Ekkamai Eastern Bus Terminal

Other information
- Station code: E7

History
- Opened: 5 December 1999

Passengers
- 2021: 2,116,054

Services
Preceding station	BTS Skytrain	Following station
Thong Lo towards Khu Khot	Sukhumvit Line	Phra Khanong towards Kheha
Location

Ekkamai station (Thai: สถานีเอกมัย, pronounced [sā.tʰǎː.nīː ʔèːk.kā.māj]) is a BTS skytrain station, on the Sukhumvit line in Phra Khanong Nuea Subdistrict, Watthana District and Phra Khanong Subdistrict, Khlong Toei District, Bangkok, Thailand. The station opened on 5 December 1999 along with the rest of the Sukhumvit Line's first phase.

The elevated station is located on Sukhumvit Road at Soi Ekkamai (Soi Sukhumvit 63) at the intersection with Ekkamai Road, where APAC Tower is located, next to the Ekkamai Bus Terminal which provides travelling to eastern provinces. Science Centre for Education is also located next to the station. It houses Bangkok Planetarium, the oldest planetarium in the country.

The Ekkamai area was ranked 27th among the world’s coolest neighborhoods by Time Out, noted for its café culture, nightlife, and restaurants.

Ekkamai Station Traditional sign

== Facilities ==
- Next to the BTS station is the Ekkamai Bus Terminal to Chon Buri, Pattaya, and Rayong.
- For shopping, this station has direct connections to Major Cineplex Sukhumvit, home to a modern cinema, bowling alley, karaoke lounges and a modest mall; the Japanese concept mall, Gateway Ekkamai, with many Japanese-inspired eateries; and Ekkamai Corner, the retail component of APAC Tower.

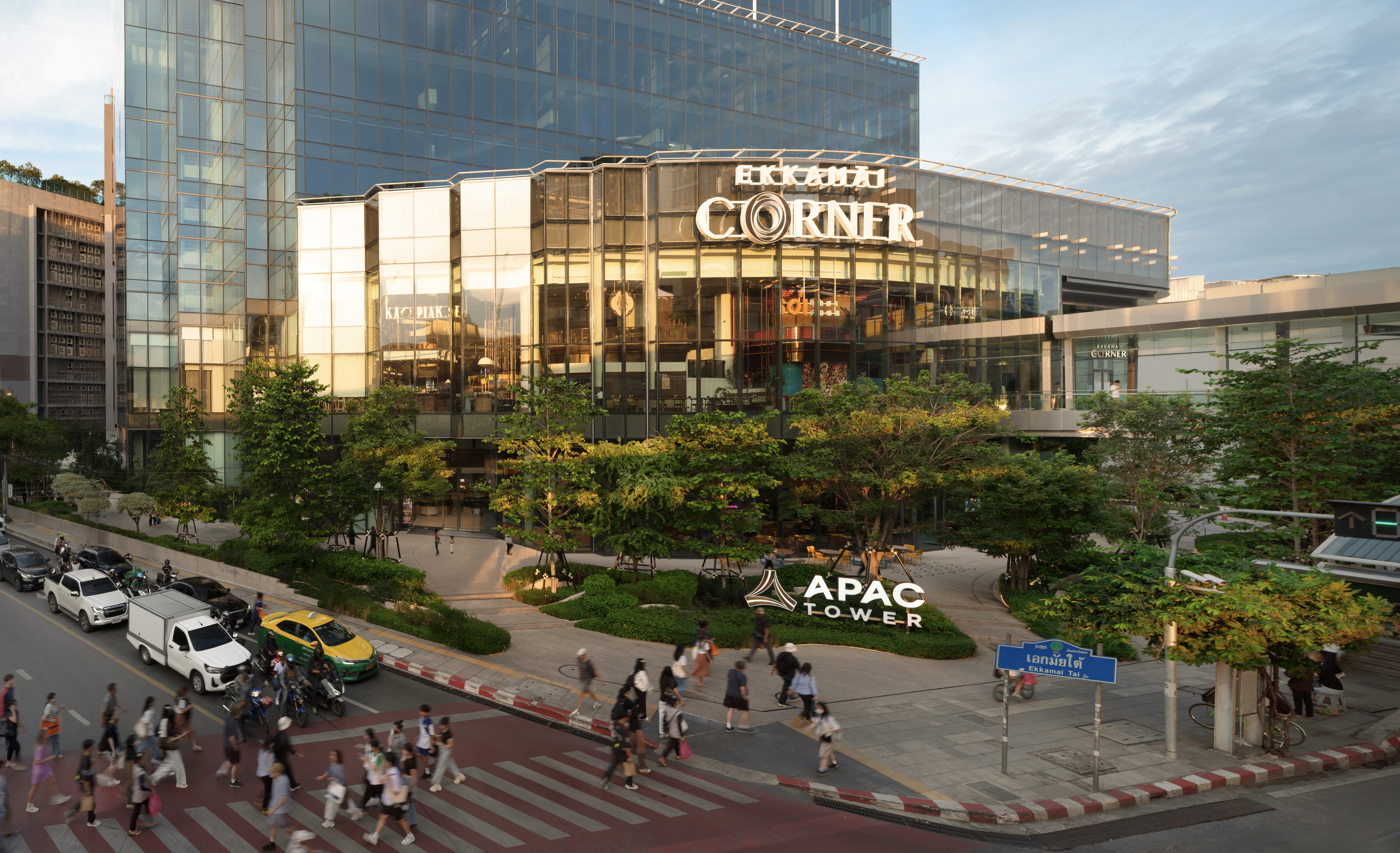
Ekkamai Tai Junction (แยกเอกมัยใต้), looking north along Ekkamai Road with APAC Tower at the corner with BTS Ekkamai

== See also ==
- Bangkok Skytrain
