= Ekkamai station =

Ekkamai station may refer to:

- Ekkamai BTS station
- Ekkamai Bus Terminal
