= Thong Lo BTS station =

Skytrain station in Bangkok, Thailand

Thong Lo ทองหล่อ
- Thong Lo station sign

General information
- Location: Khlong Toei and Watthana; Bangkok; Thailand
- Coordinates: 13°43′27.28″N 100°34′42.81″E
- System: BTS
- Owner: Bangkok Metropolitan Administration (BMA); BTS Rail Mass Transit Growth Infrastructure Fund (BTSGIF)
- Operator: Bangkok Mass Transit System; Public Company Limited (BTSC)
- Line: Sukhumvit Line

Other information
- Station code: E6

History
- Opened: 5 December 1999

Passengers
- 2021: 2,047,001

Services
Preceding station	BTS Skytrain	Following station
Phrom Phong towards Khu Khot	Sukhumvit Line	Ekkamai towards Kheha
Location

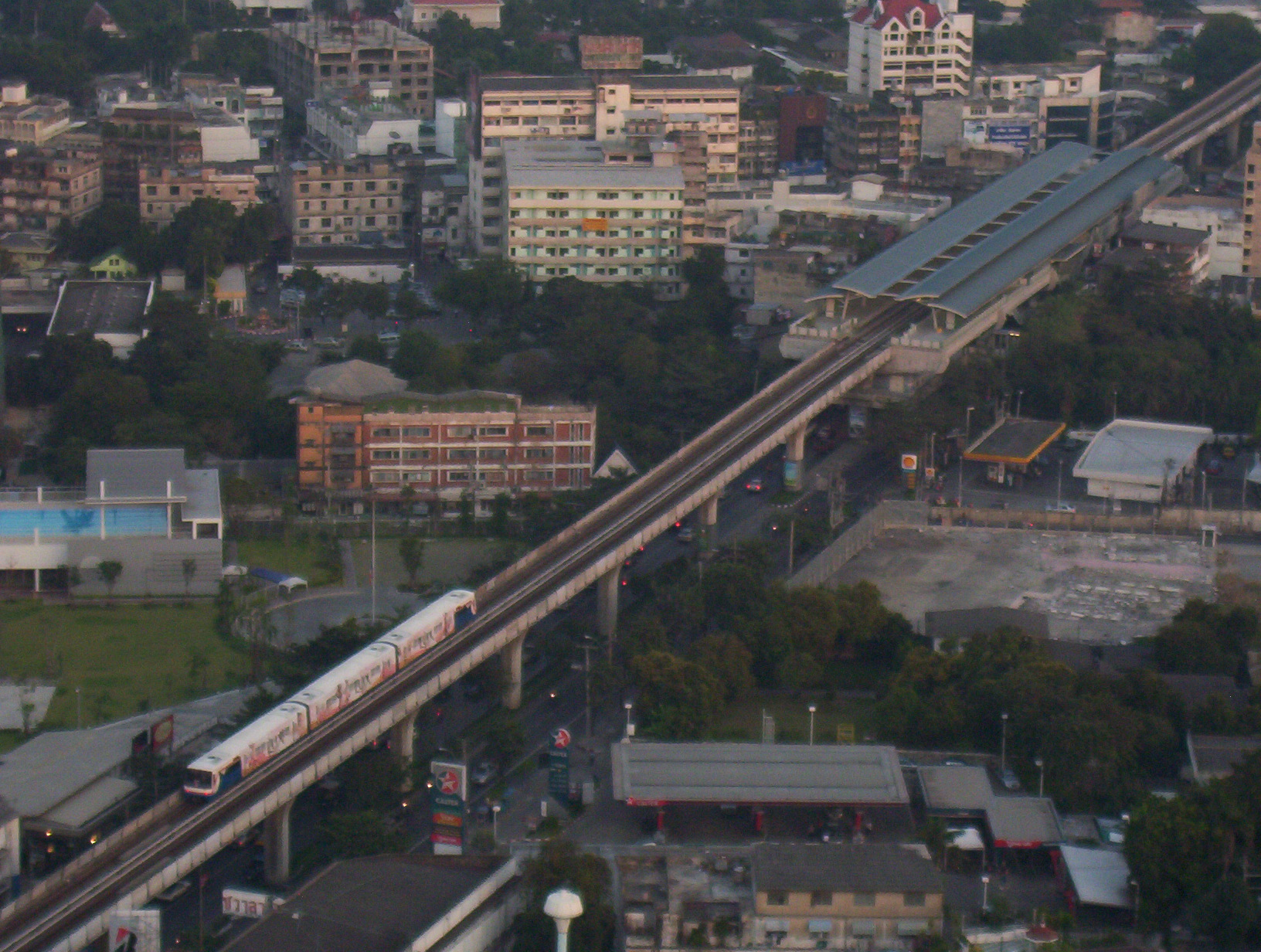
A close up as a train heads towards Thong Lo BTS.

Thong Lo station (Thai: สถานีทองหล่อ, pronounced [sā.tʰǎː.nīː tʰɔ̄ːŋ lɔ̀ː]) is a BTS Skytrain station, on the Sukhumvit Line in Khlong Toei and Watthana Districts, Bangkok, Thailand. The station opened in December 1999 along with the rest of the Sukhumvit Line's first phase. The elevated station is located on Sukhumvit Road at Soi Thong Lo (Sukhumvit Soi 55). The neighborhood is known for its many Japanese immigrants, and the area and its nearby side-streets are known for trendy bars and restaurants.

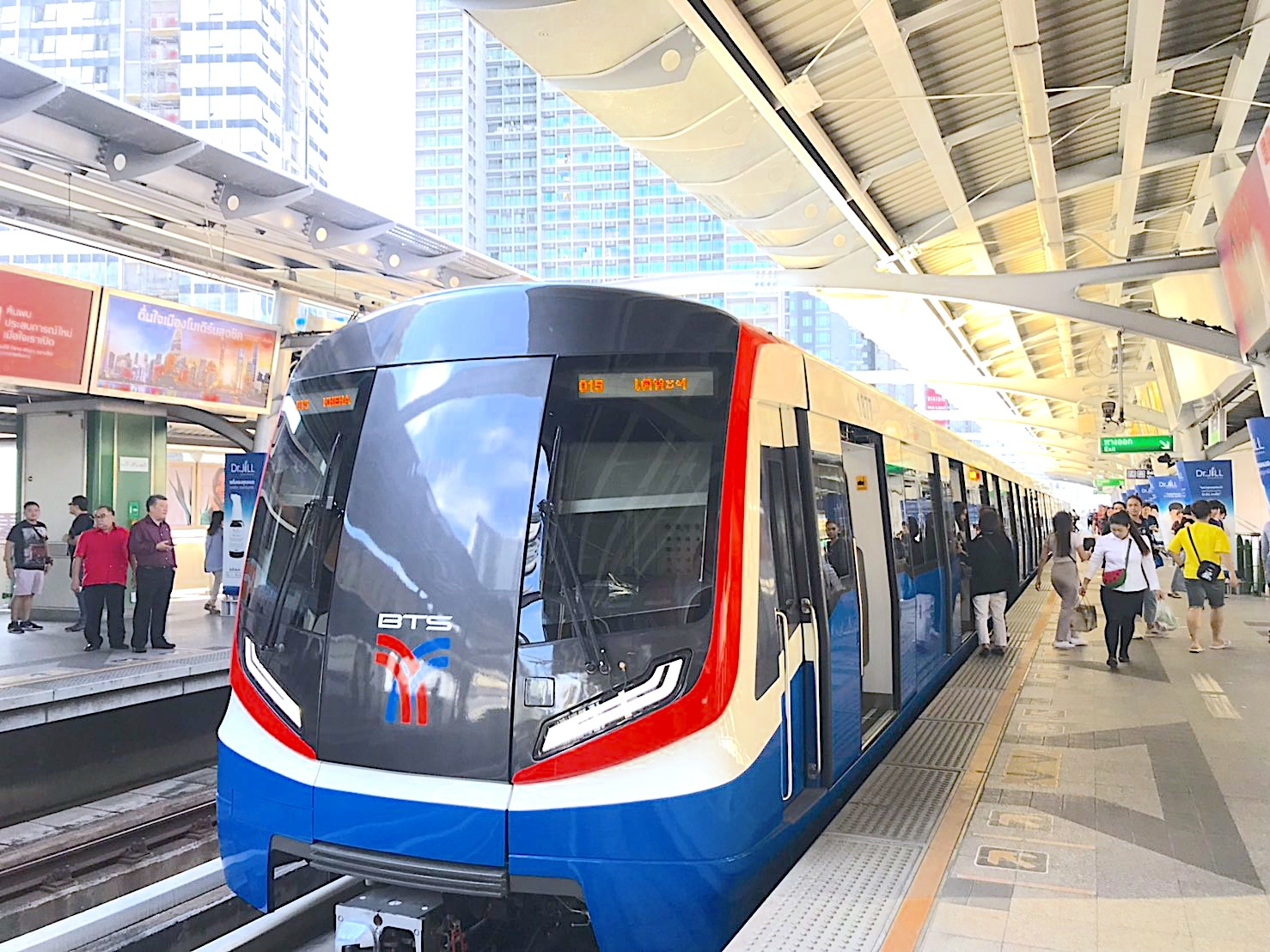
EMU-B3 77 Car on the BTS Skytrain, Thong Lo Station (E6) November 30th, 2019. The first day that EMU-B3 operates. On the Sukhumvit Line.

== See also ==
- Bangkok Skytrain
