= Ekkamai Road =

Road in Bangkok, Thailand

- Soi Sukhumvit 63
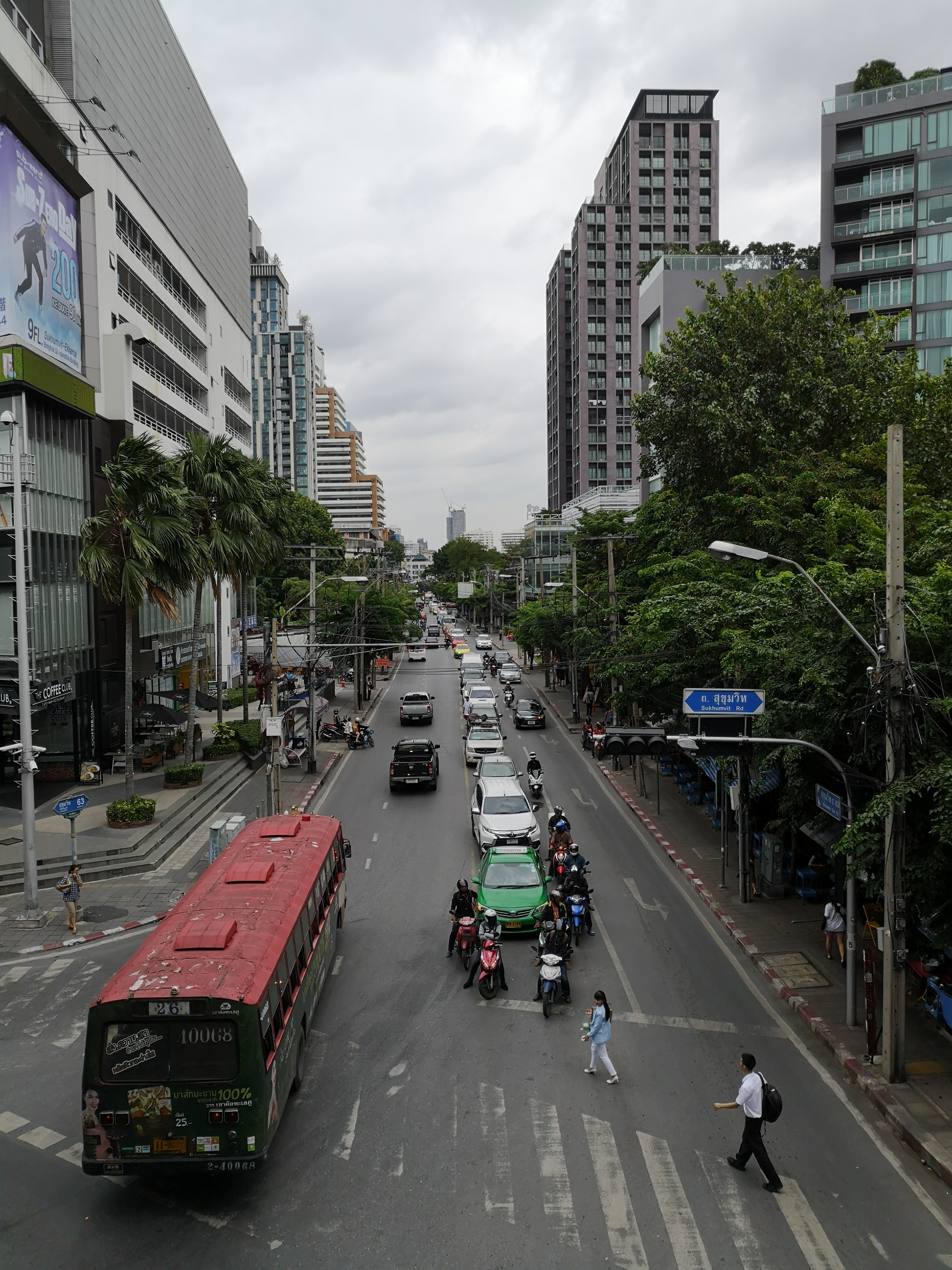
- At junction with Sukhumvit Road
- Interactive map of Ekkamai Road
- Native name: ถนนเอกมัย (Thai)
- Length: 2.5 km (1.6 mi)
- Width: 18 m (5.9 ft)
- Location: Watthana and Huai Khwang, Bangkok
- Coordinates: 13.72005°N 100.584417°E
- Major junctions: Ekkamai Tai; Ekkamai Nuea
- North: Phetchaburi Road
- South: Sukhumvit Road

Ekkamai Road (Thai: ถนนเอกมัย, RTGS: Thanon Ekkamai, pronounced [tʰā.nǒn ʔèk.kā.māj], often known colloquially as simply Ekkamai, also spelled: Ekamai), officially known as Soi Sukhumvit 63 (ซอยสุขุมวิท 63), is a soi in the form of road, and the name of the surrounding of its location in Bangkok. Ekkamai is a road that connects Sukhumvit Road in Khlong Tan Nuea and Phra Khanong Nuea Subdistricts, Watthana District with Phetchaburi Road in Bang Kapi Subdistrict, Huai Khwang District and crosses Khlong Saen Saep canal in the final stretch. It has a starting point at Ekkamai Tai Junction (แยกเอกมัยใต้), where it intersects Sukhumvit Road, at the corner of which is APAC Tower, opposite Bangkok Eastern Bus Terminal, Science Centre for Education and Bangkok Planetarium, where it is referred to as Soi Sukhumvit 63 and northward up till it ends at Ekkamai Nuea Junction (แยกเอกมัยเหนือ), where it intersects Phetchaburi Road, total length 2,524 m (8,280 ft, 2.5 km), width 18 m (59 ft). The area is served by the Ekkamai Station on the BTS Skytrain's Sukhumvit Line, which runs above Sukhumvit Road.

Ekkamai was ranked 27th among the world’s coolest neighborhoods by Time Out, noted for its café culture, nightlife, and restaurants.

Ekkamai road is regarded as part of Sukhumvit Road, just like the nearby Thong Lo, and have two connected alleys. Because it is filled with the locations of office buildings, restaurants and cafés, pubs and bars, embassies, banks, condominiums and foreign residents. Once it was the location of the residence of MR Seni Pramoj, the sixth Prime Minister of Thailand.

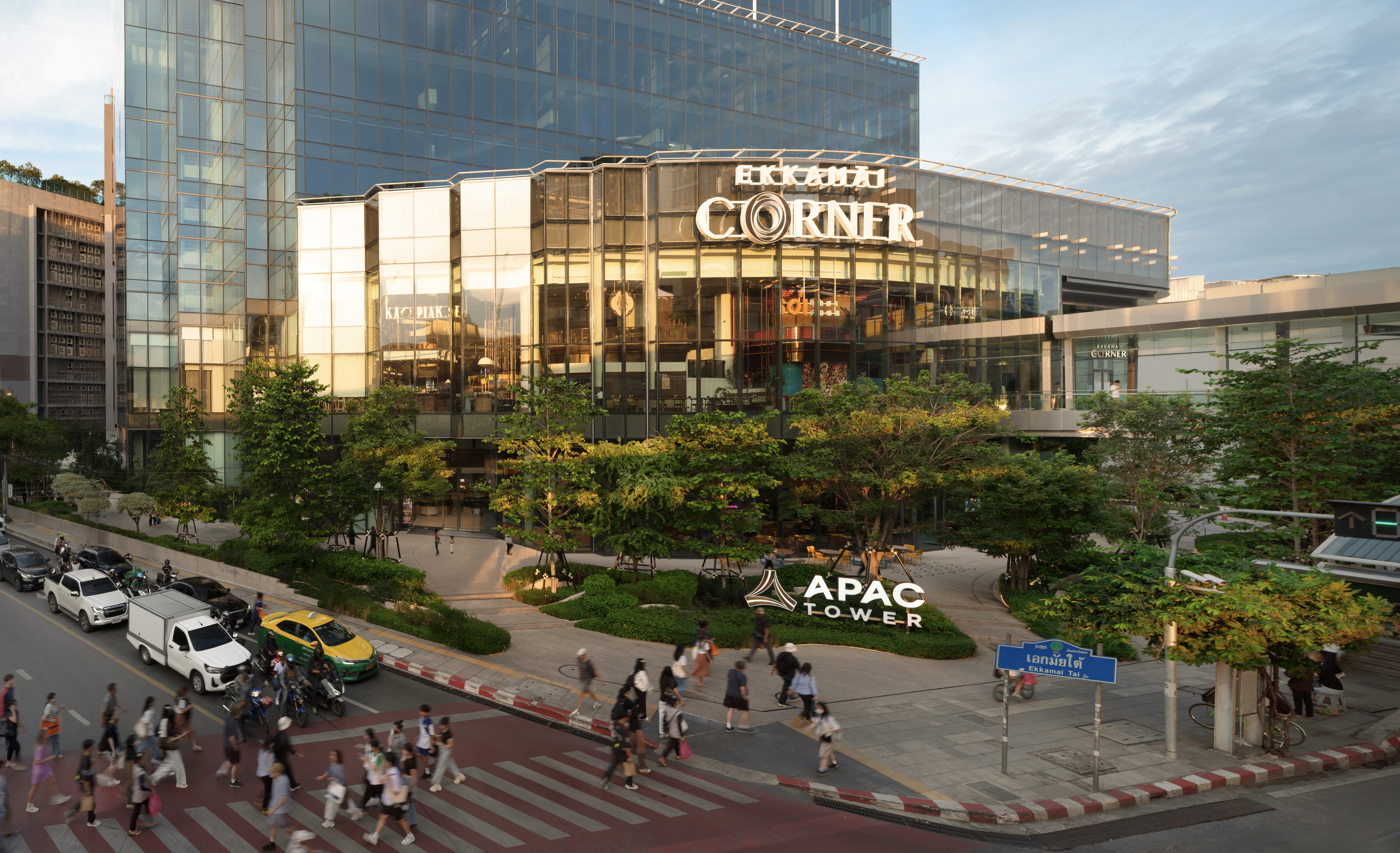
Ekkamai Tai Junction (แยกเอกมัยใต้), looking north along Ekkamai Road with APAC Tower at the corner

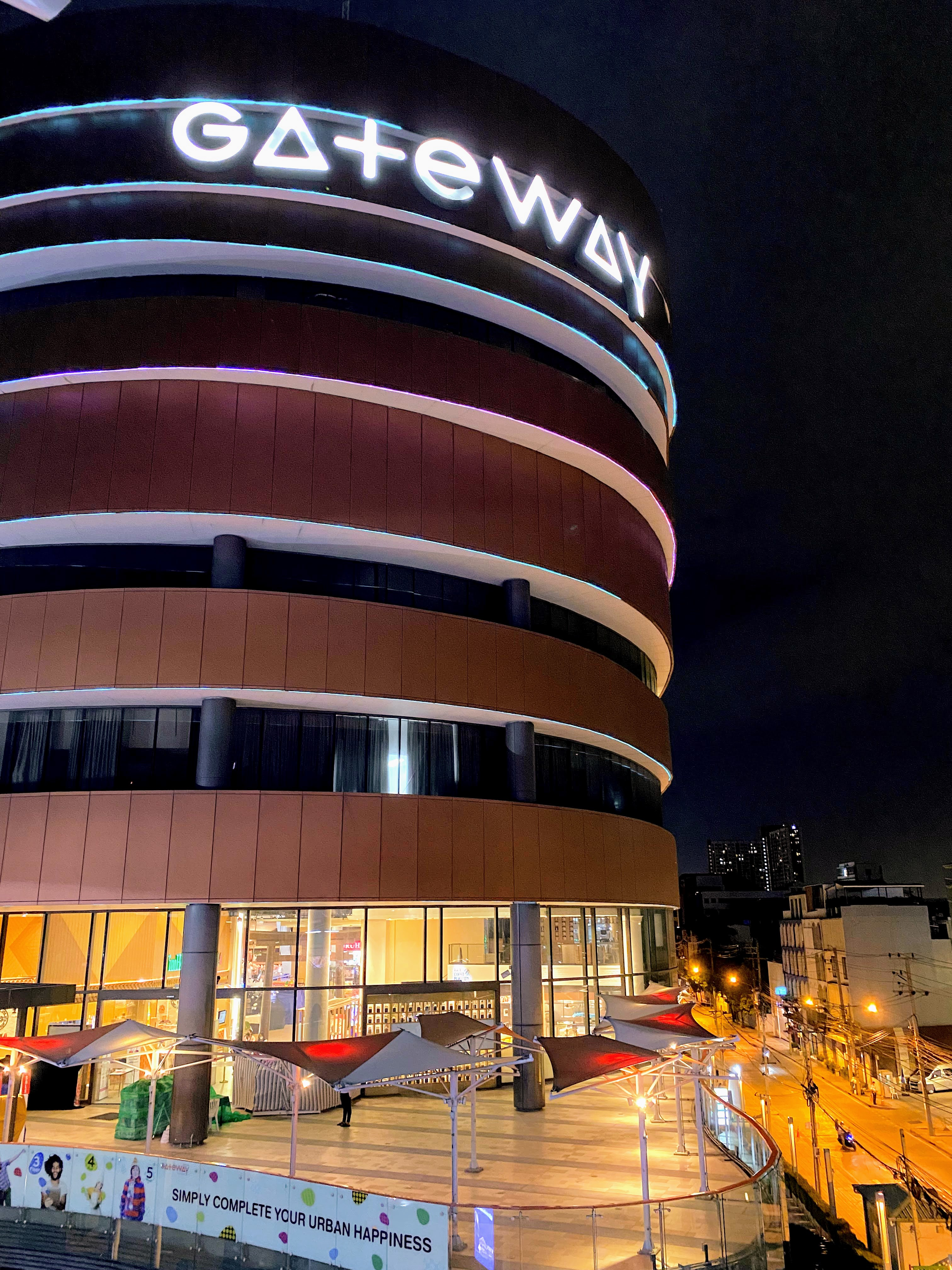
Gateway Mall is connected to Ekkamai BTS station
