= Eve Palasak =

Thai designer and chef

Nutthida "Eve" Palasak (Thai: ณัฐธิดา "อีฟ" พละศักดิ์) is a Thai designer and chef. Eve is the founder of Found Isan, a nonprofit that identifies handmade products from Isan (Northeastern Thailand) for sale to international markets.

== Early life and education ==
Palasak was born in Sisaket province and raised in Ubon Ratchathani province. She studied fashion in the United Kingdom.

== Career ==
Eve founded Zao, an Isan restaurant in Ubon Ratchathani, later opening a branch in Ekkamai, Bangkok. Both attempt to reintroduce Isan flavors in a fine dining environment. Eve later opened Saole, a restaurant drawing on flavors from the mountains and sea.
