= Hẻm =

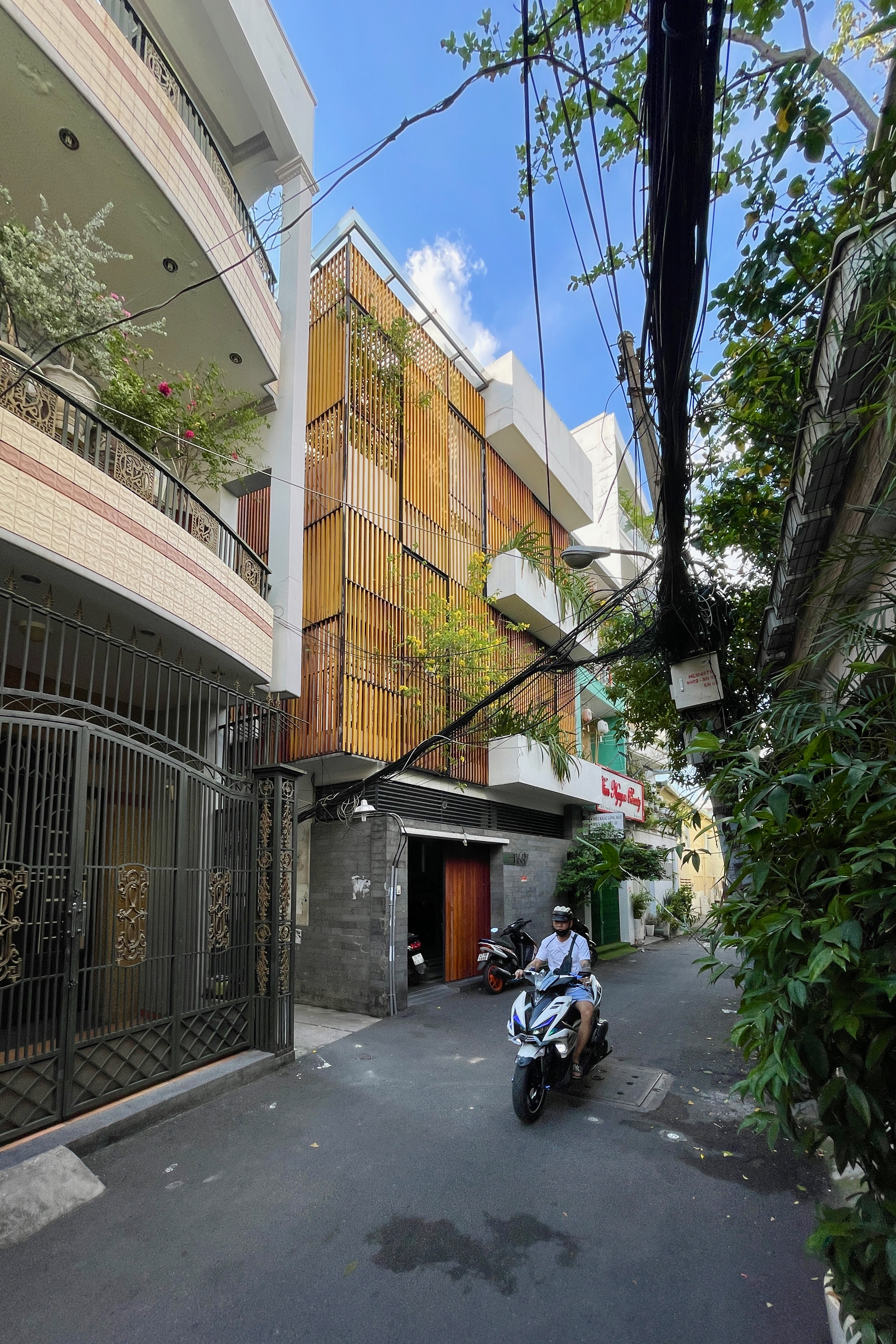
A hẻm in District 3, Ho Chi Minh City

Hem (Vietnamese: Hẻm) or Ngo (Vietnamese: Ngõ) are the terms used to describe narrow streets branching off of main roads in Vietnam. Hem are characterized by their narrow width and are lined with narrow, multistory buildings known as tube houses, creating a dense and vertical urban form.

In 2016, 85% of residents in Ho Chi Minh City and 88% in Hanoi lived in hem alleyways. Hems are numbered and referred to by the name of the major street it branches off of, similarly to Sois in Thailand.. The number of the hem is chosen equal to the number of the house on the parental alley or street located near the entrance to the alley. Slashes are used to indicate an address in a hem, so the address "36/23 Hẻm Lê Thị Riêng" indicates the house is number 23 in the 36th Hem off Lê Thị Riêng street.

== See also ==
- Alley
- Soi
- Hutong
