= Accademia Italiana Thailand =

- Type: Private
- Established: 2006
- Location: Bangkok, Thailand
- Website: www.aithai.co.th

Accademia Italiana Thailand is a fashion and design institute founded in 2006 in Bangkok's Watthana District. Accademia Italiana Thailand no longer carries out any type of academic activity.
