= Ekkamai Bus Terminal =

Bus station in Bangkok, Thailand

Bangkok Bus Terminal (Ekkamai) สถานีขนส่งผู้โดยสารกรุงเทพ (เอกมัย)
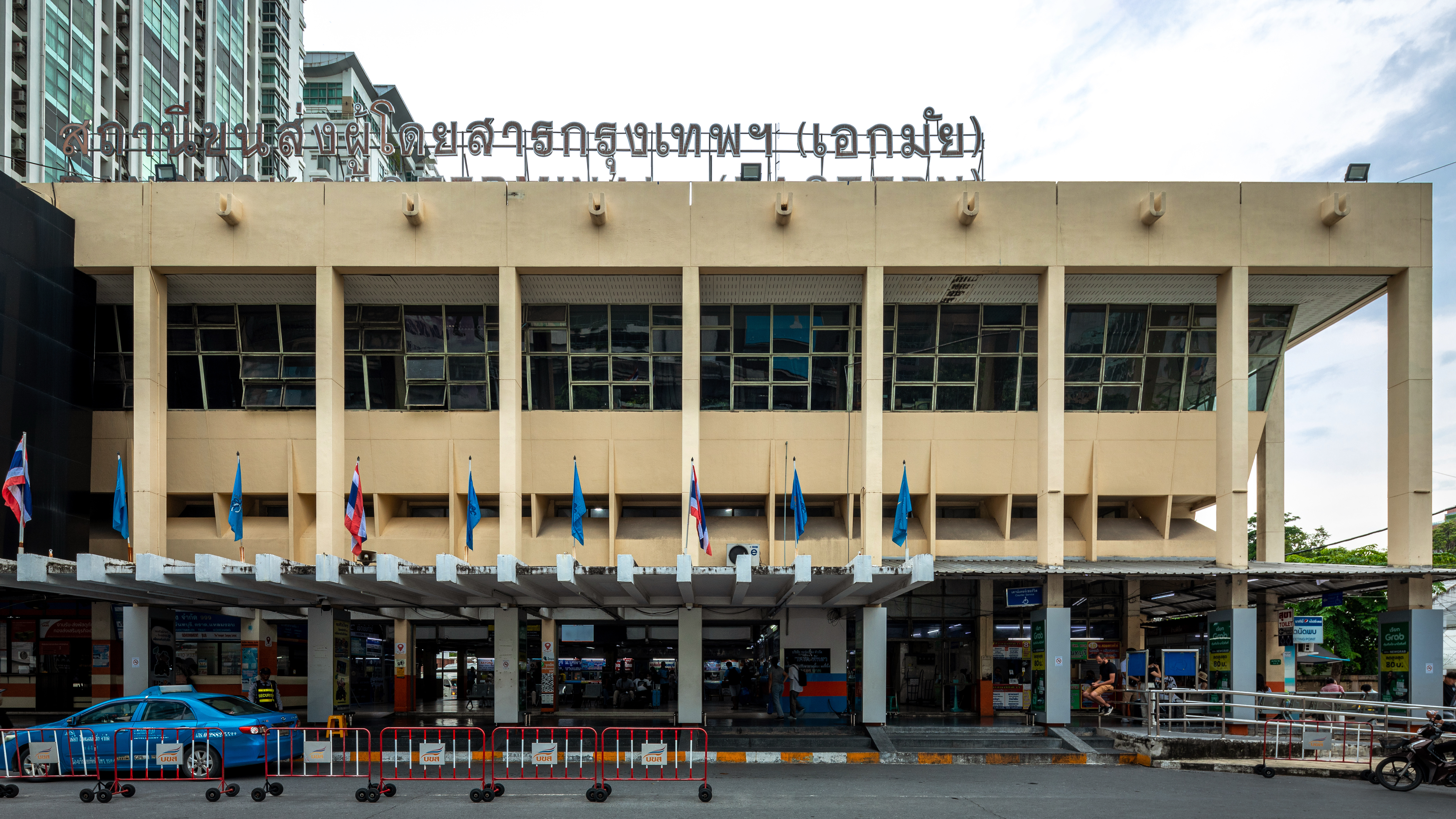

General information
- Location: Sukhumvit road, Khlong Tan subdistrict, Khlong Toei district, Bangkok; Thailand
- Coordinates: 13.719142°N 100.583985°E
- Bus routes: Eastern Thailand
- Bus stands: 26 platforms
- Bus operators: The Transport Company, Ltd.
- Connections: Ekkamai BTS station

History
- Opened: 1 January 1960; 66 years ago
Location

Bangkok Bus Terminal (Ekkamai) , commonly known as Ekkamai Bus Terminal, is one of the three main long-distance bus stations serving Greater Bangkok. Managed by The Transport Company, it is the main spot for those who are traveling by bus along the coast to and from Eastern Thailand. The station is located on the intersection between Sukhumvit and Ekkamai roads. The station was opened on 1 January 1960. Unlike the other two main long-distance bus terminals serving Greater Bangkok (Mo Chit 2 bus terminal and New Southern Bus Terminal), Ekkamai Bus Terminal has never been relocated. The station is located next to the Ekkamai BTS station on Sukhumvit Line and opposite APAC Tower.

In 2025, The Ministry of Transport is considering moving all three main long-distance bus terminals to Krung Thep Aphiwat Central Terminal.

== History ==
Prior to 1959, there was barely any regulations on long-distance buses. Any operators with enough capital may provide bus services either under the name of an individual or a company, and there was no concession from the government to control the operation of the buses. At that time, bus stations in the eastern region along the coast had a parking area at 22 July Circle. Passengers had to sit on the bus or rest in a nearby coffee shop prior to bus departure.

In 1959, the government announced regulations for the long-distance bus routes connecting Bangkok to other regions by announcing long-distance routes in 30 provinces, divided into 5 lines: Southern Line, Northern Line, Northeastern Line, Eastern Line, and Eastern coastal Line. As well as regulating more stop to cover more land. However, it was not comprehensive. Thus, in the following year, 1960, only the Eastern Line and Eastern coastal Line along the coast went all the way to Prachin Buri and Trat Provinces.

In the same year, three stations for long-distance passenger transport were opened on January 1, 1960, of which Ekkamai Bus Terminal was one of the three bus stations for the Eastern coastal bus route, located in what was Phra Khanong Subdistrict, Phra Khanong District at that time.

== Future plans ==
In 2022, The Transport Company announced a plan to relocate the station to the somewhere in Bang Na such as Bangkok International Trade and Exhibition Centre.
