= Thong Lo =

Street and neighborhood in Bangkok

Coordinates: 13.73248°N 100.58209°E

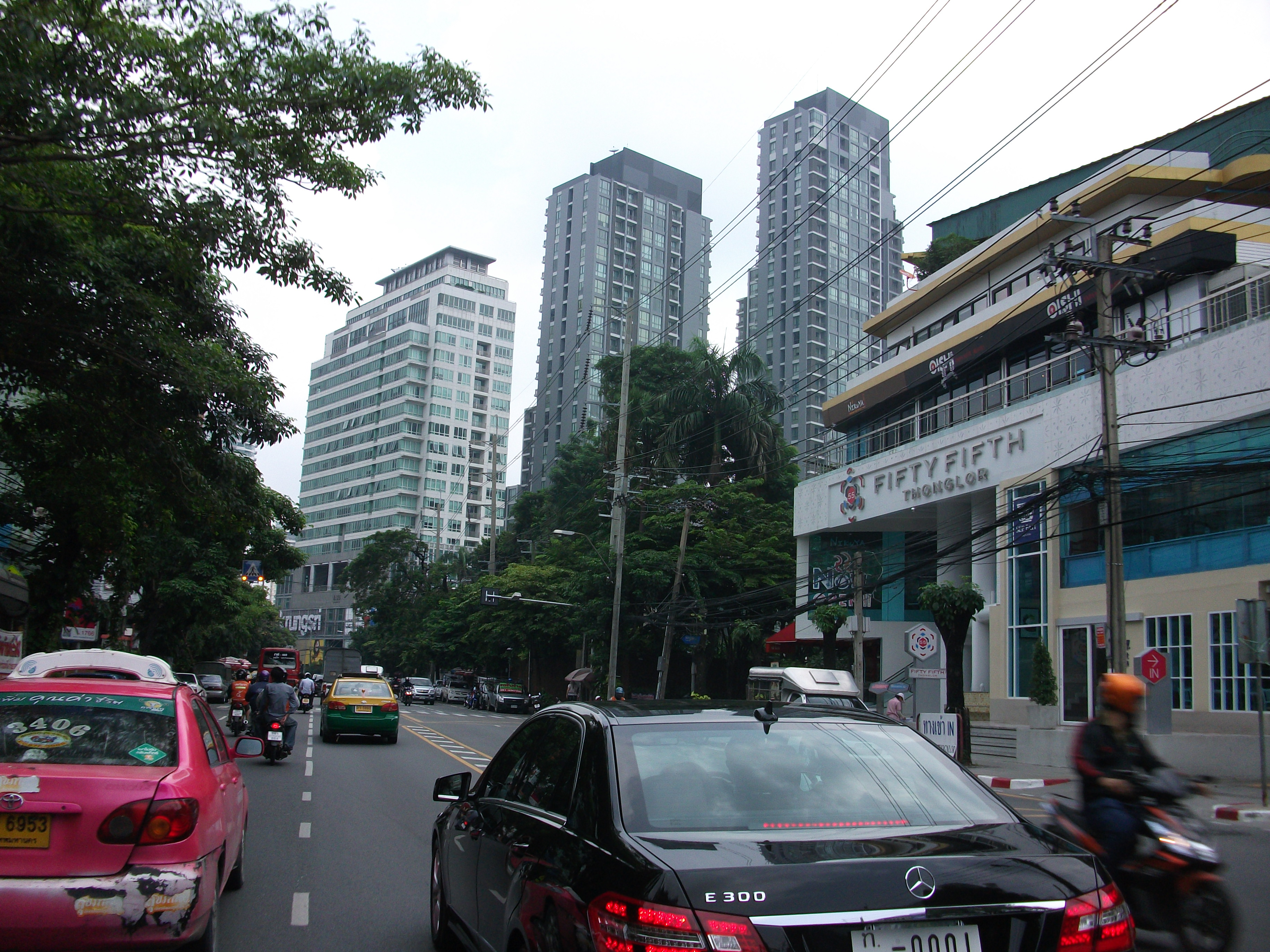
Thong Lo

Thong Lo (Thai: ทองหล่อ, RTGS: Thong Lo, pronounced [tʰɔ̄ːŋ lɔ̀ː]; also spelled Thong Lor), officially named Soi Sukhumvit 55, is a road and neighbourhood in Watthana District, Bangkok, Thailand. Thong Lo literally translates as 'molten gold'. Its name comes from that of a naval officer, Thonglo Khamhiran, a member of the Khana Ratsadon (People's Party), a 1932 revolutionary group. He owned land and houses in the area. In pre-World War II Thailand, the area along Sukhumvit Road to the Bang Na District was suburban Bangkok and quasi-rural. Much of the area was occupied by the navy.

Thong Lo runs from the Thong Lo BTS Station on Sukhumvit Road north to Phetchaburi Road. Originally housing car dealerships and dowdy shops, during the early-2000s it became increasingly trendy. New boutiques, restaurants, and cocktail bars sprang up, creating a demand for new condominiums in the area, partially driven by a significant Japanese expat community. In 2017, to the dismay of many, the Bangkok Metropolitan Administration (BMA) cracked down on the neighbourhood's street food vendors.

== Transport ==
- Thong Lo BTS Station on the Sukhumvit Line of the Bangkok Skytrain is at the intersection with Sukhumvit Road.
- Khlong Saen Saep Express Boat – Thong Lo pier is at the bridge crossing Khlong Saen Saep, at the opposite end of the street, near the New Phetchaburi Road intersection.
- The planned Grey Line (Bangkok Rapid Transit) is projected to run along Thong Lo.
