= Soi =

Thai term for a side street

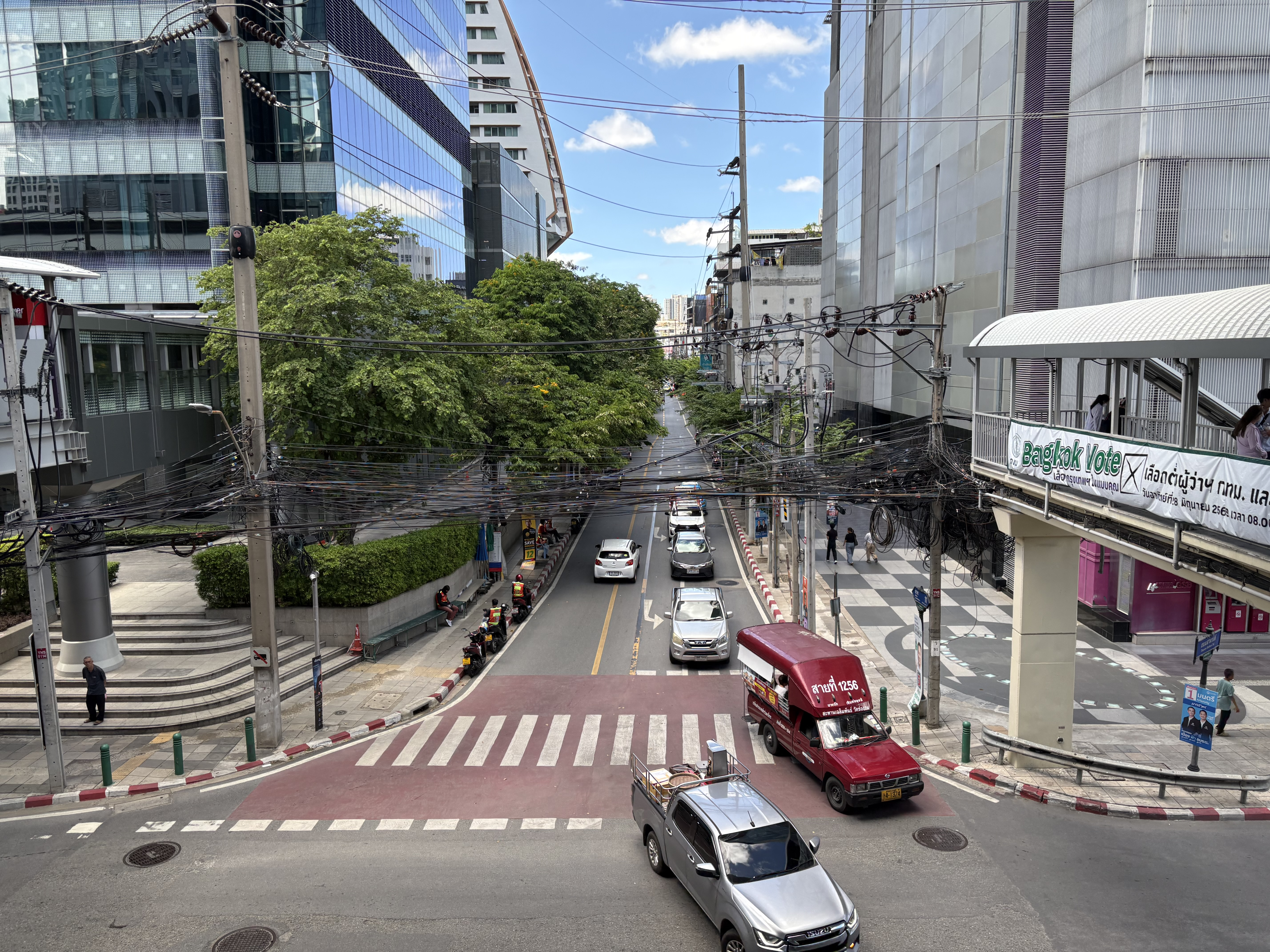
Soi Sathon 11 branching off Sathon Tai Road in Bangkok

In Thailand, a soi (Thai: ซอย [sɔ̄ːj]) is a side street that branches off of a major street (thanon, Thai: ถนน). An alley is called a trok (Thai: ตรอก).

== Overview ==
Sois are usually numbered, and are referred to by the name of the major street and the number, as in "Soi Sukhumvit 4", "Sukhumvit Soi 4", or "Sukhumvit 4", all referring to the fourth soi of Sukhumvit Road in Bangkok. When walking on the major street towards increasing soi numbers, all the even-numbered sois are on the right side and the odd-numbered ones on the left side of the street. It is possible that soi 20 is far away from soi 21 if there are more sois on one side of the street than on the other. If for instance a new soi is added between soi 7 and soi 9 it will get the number soi 7/1, the next one soi 7/2, etc.

While sois are commonly referred to by number, many sois in Bangkok also have a name. On lower Sukhumvit road in Bangkok, for instance, the sois are named after important landowners or families of landowners who had land in the area in the past. Some sois become major thoroughfares and because of that get known by their name only. Examples are Asok (Soi Sukhumvit 21), Thong Lo (Soi Sukhumvit 55), Ekkamai (Soi Sukhumvit 63), Pridi Banomyong (Soi Sukhumvit 71), etc.

Sois can themselves have sois branching off them, for example Thong Lo Soi 4 is the 4th soi branching off Thong Lo, itself the 55th soi branching off Sukhumvit Road.

The houses in a soi are numbered. If a new house is inserted after the house with number 150 for instance, it will get the number 150/1, etc. A formal address might read "150/1 Soi Sukhumvit 7", referring to the house with the first number after 150 in the seventh soi of Sukhumvit Road. The house numbers in most sois do not start at 1, but continue the house numbers of the main street.

== See also ==
- Hẻm, a similar term in Vietnam
- Hutong, a similar term in China
