= Watthana district =

Watthana วัฒนา
- Khet
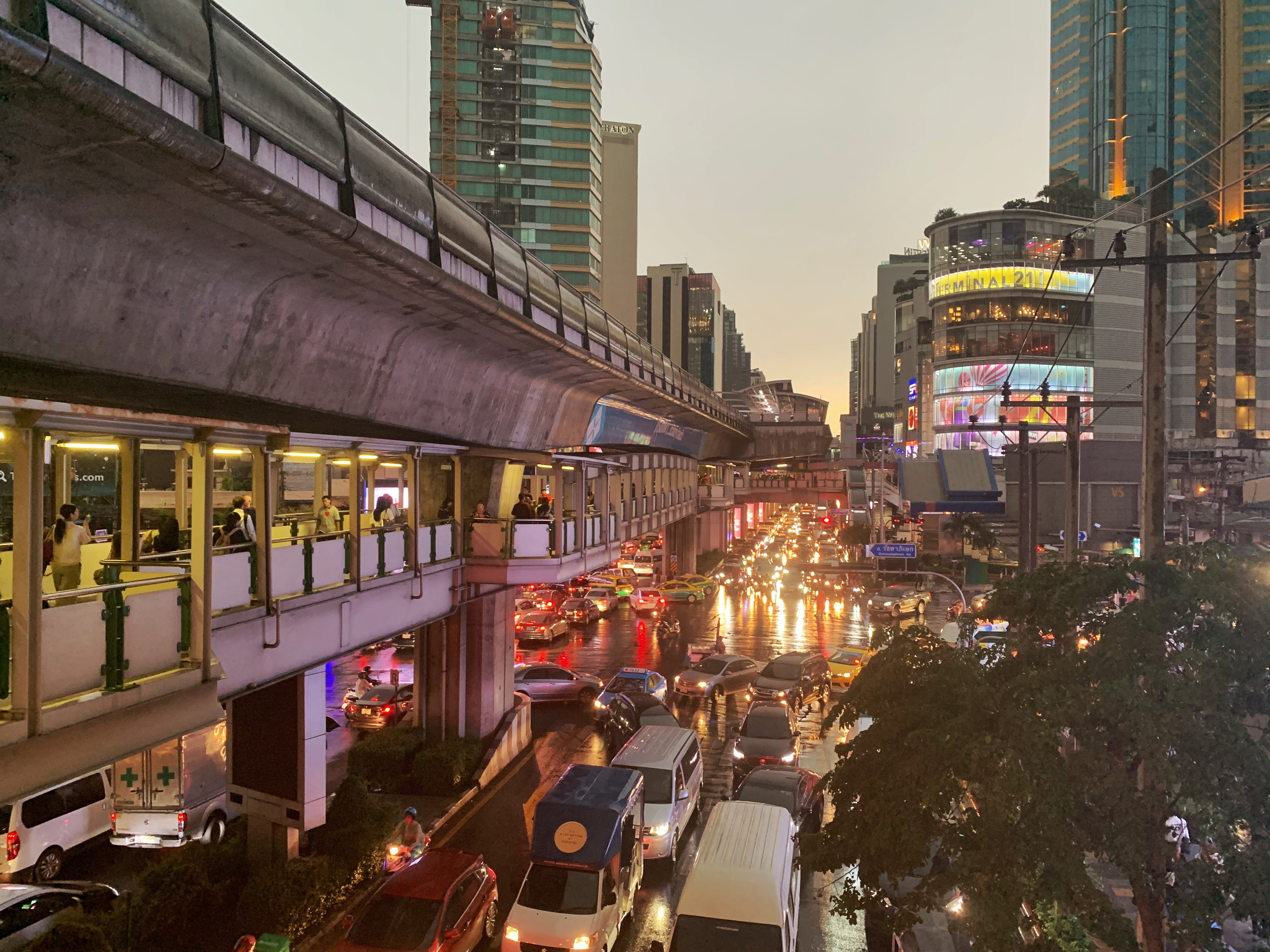
- Sukhumwit Road intersection with the Asok Montri Road in Watthana District to the right

- Khet location in Bangkok
- Coordinates: 13°44′32″N 100°35′9″E
- Country: Thailand
- Province: Bangkok
- Seat: Khlong Tan Nuea
- Khwaeng: 3
- Khet established: 6 March 1998

Area
  - Total: 12.565 km^{2} (4.851 sq mi)

Population (2017)
  - Total: 84,967
  - Density: 6,762.19/km^{2} (17,514.0/sq mi)
- Time zone: UTC+7 (ICT)
- Postal code: 10110 parts of Phra Khanong Nuea: 10260
- Geocode: 1039

Watthana or Vadhana (Thai: วัฒนา, pronounced [wát.tʰā.nāː]) is one of the 50 districts (khet) of Bangkok, Thailand. Neighbouring districts are (from the north clockwise): Ratchathewi, Huai Khwang, Suan Luang, Phra Khanong, Khlong Toei, and Pathum Wan.

== History ==
District map

Watthana became a separate district by splitting from Khlong Toei in 1998 to provide better service to its population. The district obtained its name from Princess Galyani Vadhana, the elder sister of King Bhumibol Adulyadej. Watthana or Vadhana means 'development'. The area is among the most developed parts of Bangkok.

On 1 January 2009, Watthana was the location of the Santika Club fire, which killed 66 and injured 222.

== Administration ==
The district is divided into three sub-districts (khwaeng), from west to east:

1.	Khlong Toei Nuea	คลองเตยเหนือ	from the railway to Soi Sukhumvit 31 (Sawatdi)
2.	Khlong Tan Nuea	คลองตันเหนือ	from Soi Sukhumvit 31 to Soi Sukhumvit 63 (Ekkamai)
3.	Phra Khanong Nuea	พระโขนงเหนือ	from Soi Sukhumvit 63 to Soi Sukhumvit 81 (Siri Phot)

They are all named by adding Nuea, meaning North, to the corresponding subdistricts in Khlong Toei district.

== Places ==
Encompassing the area between Sukhumvit Road and Khlong Saen Saep, Watthana is one of the commercial districts in Bangkok, with many condominiums and hotels. Expatriates of many nationalities reside there.

=== Commerce ===
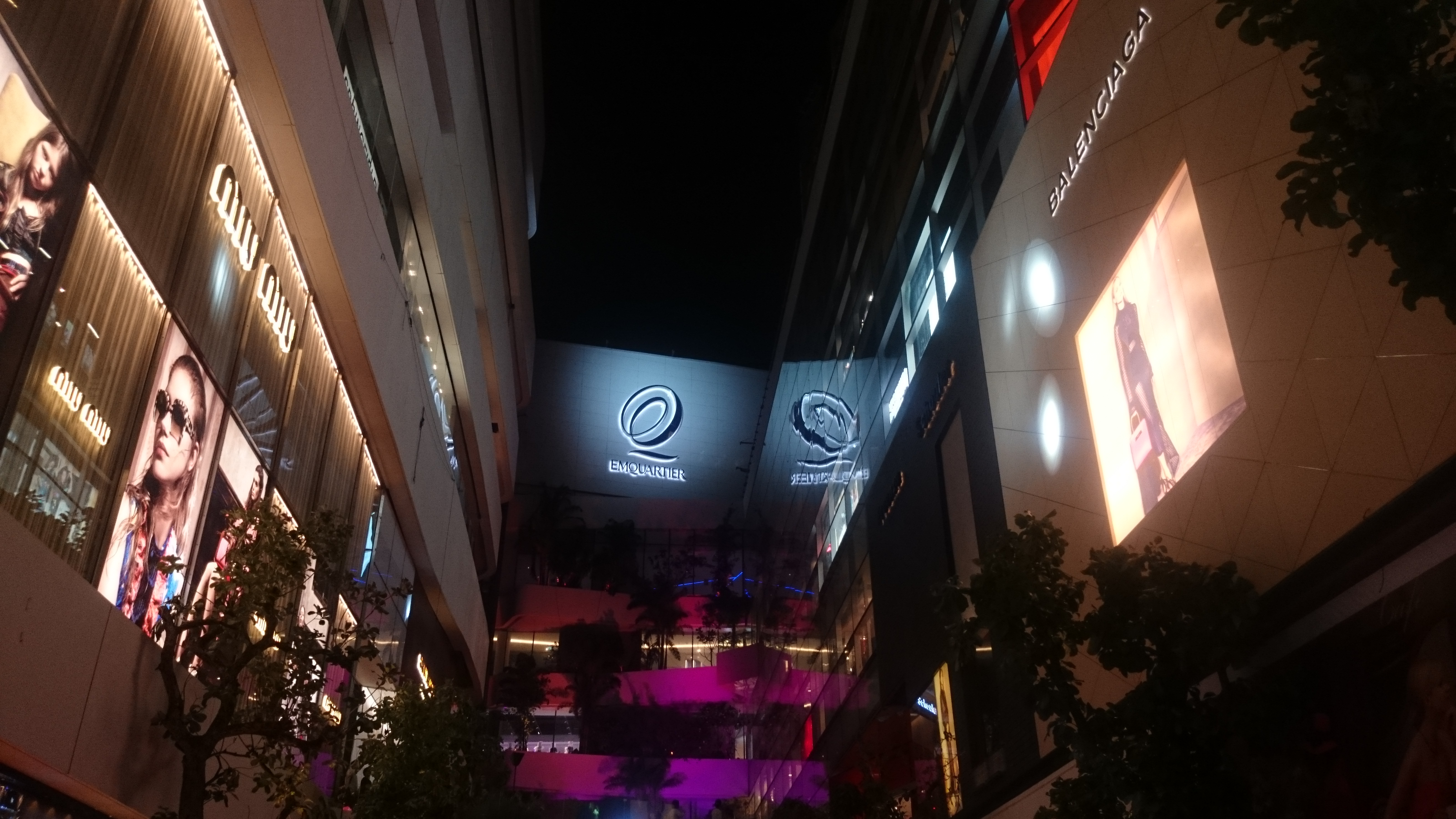
EmQuartier

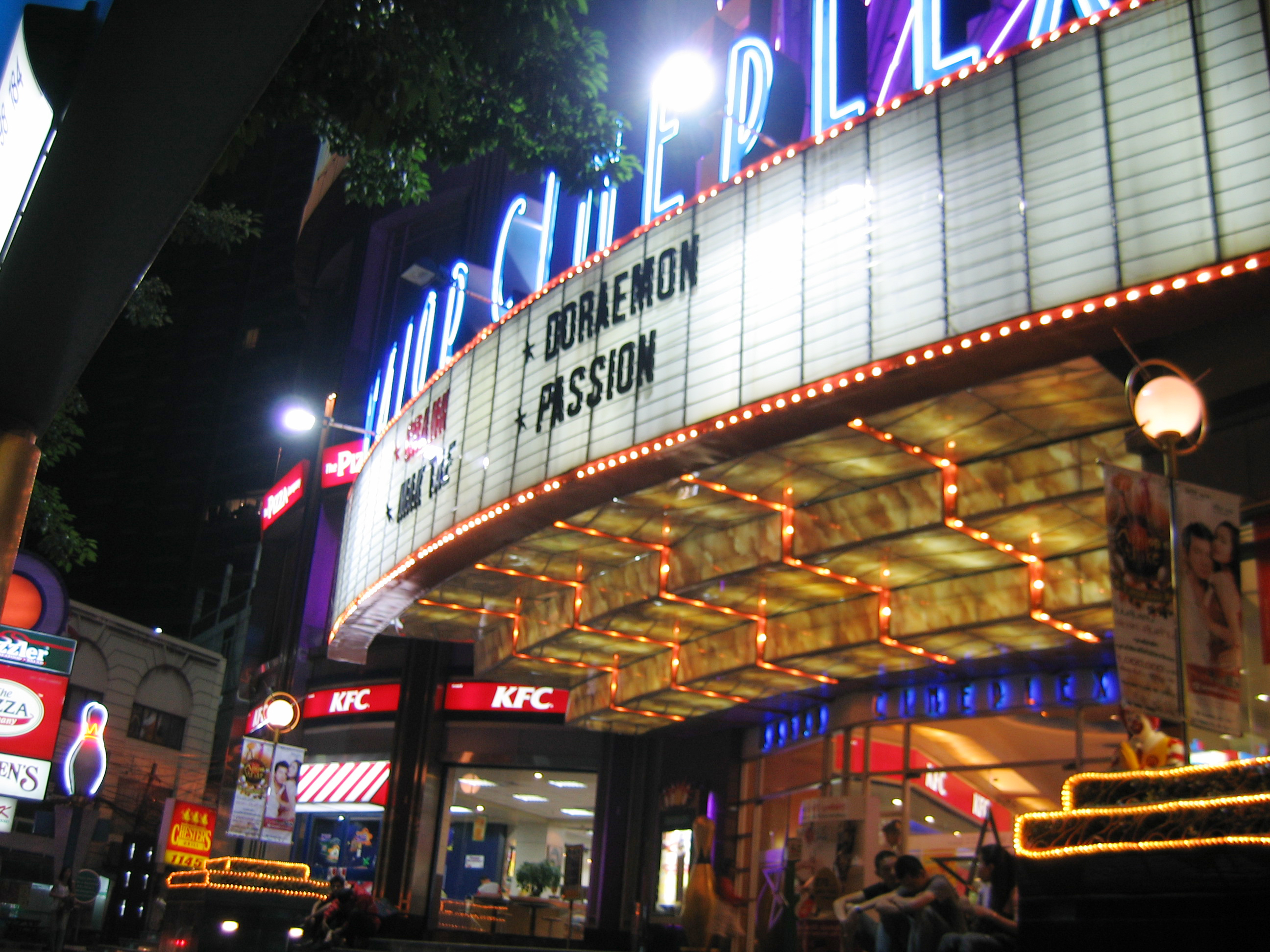
Major Sukhumvit

- Sukhumvit Road - Vendors selling various goods, mostly food and drinks from Soi 3 to Soi 15.
- Terminal 21 is a mixed-use complex near Sukhumvit Road 21, near the Asok intersection. It opened in October 2011 and is now one of the major shopping centers.
- EmQuartier - a shopping center opened in 2015. It is opposite of Emporium (which is in Khlong Toei district) and is operated by the same owner, The Mall Group.
- Villa Plaza - Between the Sukhumvit 33 nightlife area and Soi 31, the plaza is a shopping and entertainment area anchored by supermarkets.
- Thong Lo - This street has become trendy in recent years, with a number of upscale restaurants and "boutique" shopping centres.
- Major Sukhumvit - A large branch of the Major Cineplex cinema chain near Ekkamai BTS Station, with a bowling alley, restaurants and shops.

=== Dining and entertainment ===
- "Little Africa" - Near the Grace Hotel, there's a network of alleys between Nana Nuea or Sukhumvit Soi 3 and Soi 5 that is home to many Middle Eastern restaurants.
- Soi Cowboy - Nightlife strip with go-go bars is off Asok, near the intersection with Sukhumvit.

=== Hospitals ===
- Bumrungrad International Hospital - Major medical center that caters to tourists on Soi Sukhumvit 3.
- Samitivej Hospital - An up-scale hospital, on Soi Sukhumvit 49.
- Camillian Hospital - A small Catholic hospital on Thong Lo.
- Sukhumvit Hospital - Near the Bangkok Skytrain Ekkamai station.

== Transportation ==
=== Roads ===
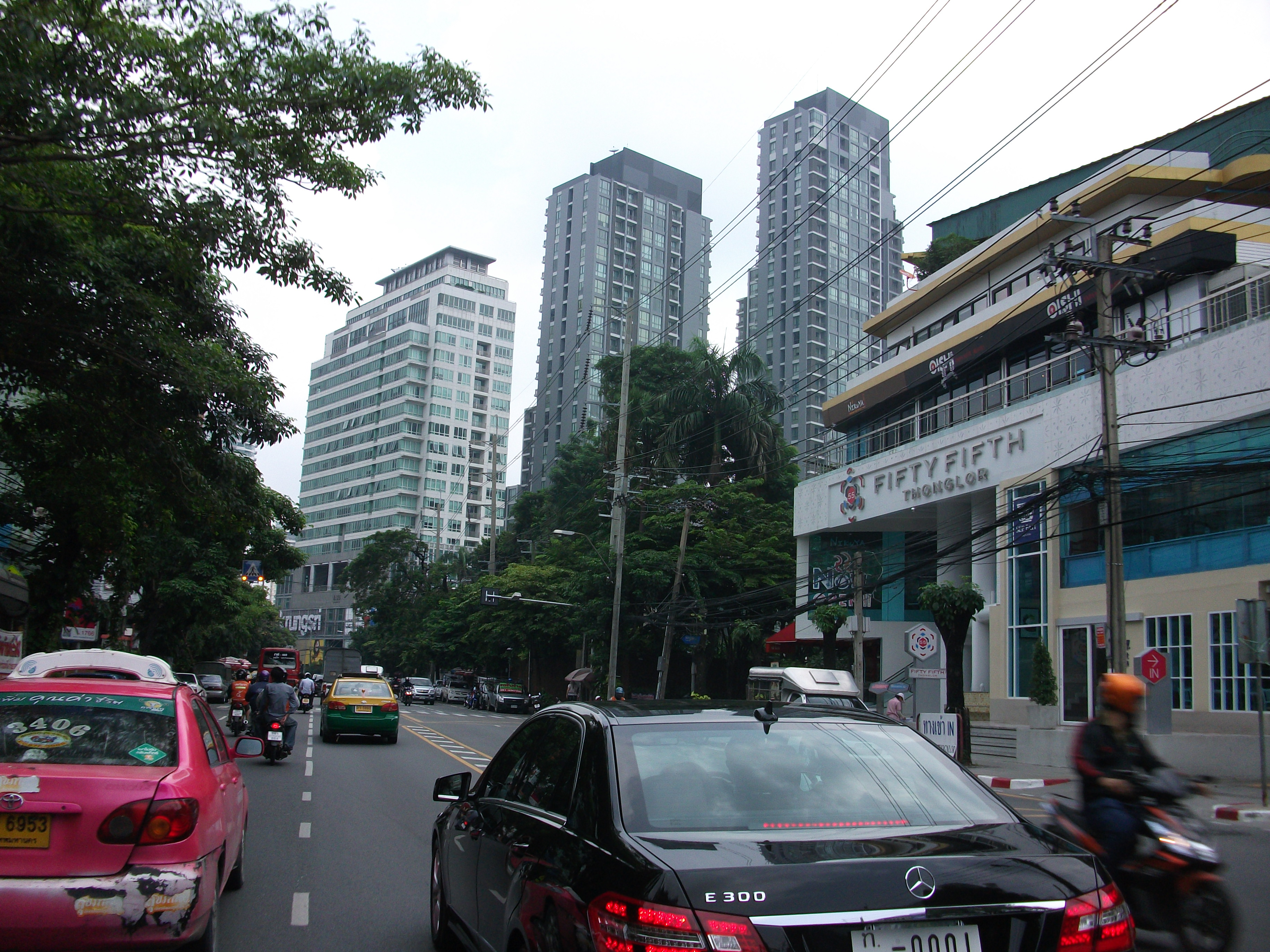
Thong Lo

Besides the eastbound Sukhumvit, prominent roads in the district include several odd-numbered sois (branch roads) from Sukhumvit: Nana Nuea (Sukhumvit 3), Asok Montri (Sukhumvit 21), Phrom Phong (Sukhumvit 39), Thong Lo (Sukhumvit 55), Ekkamai (Sukhumvit 63), Sukhumvit 71 (Pridi Banomyong) and a small portion of On Nut (Sukhumvit 77).

=== Public transportation ===
- BTS Skytrain - Stations in the district are Nana, Asok, Phrom Phong, Ekkamai, and Phra Khanong on the Sukhumvit Line
- MRT - Sukhumvit Station on the Blue Line
- Khlong Saen Saep boat service - Borders the district; piers for the express boat service are Nana Nuea, Nana Chat, Asok, Prasan Mit, Ital-Thai, Wat Mai Chong Lom, Thong Lo, Chan Issara, and Khlong Tan.

== Symbols ==
The emblem of the district shows a pavilion, which refers to the residence of Princess Galyani Vadhana, the name patron of the district. Also the red colour refers to the princess, as red is the day colour of her birthday. The golden rays of light extending from the roof of the pavilion are said to symbolise her divine grace to all Thais. The lotus shape is supposed to be an offering to pay respect to the princess.

== Education ==
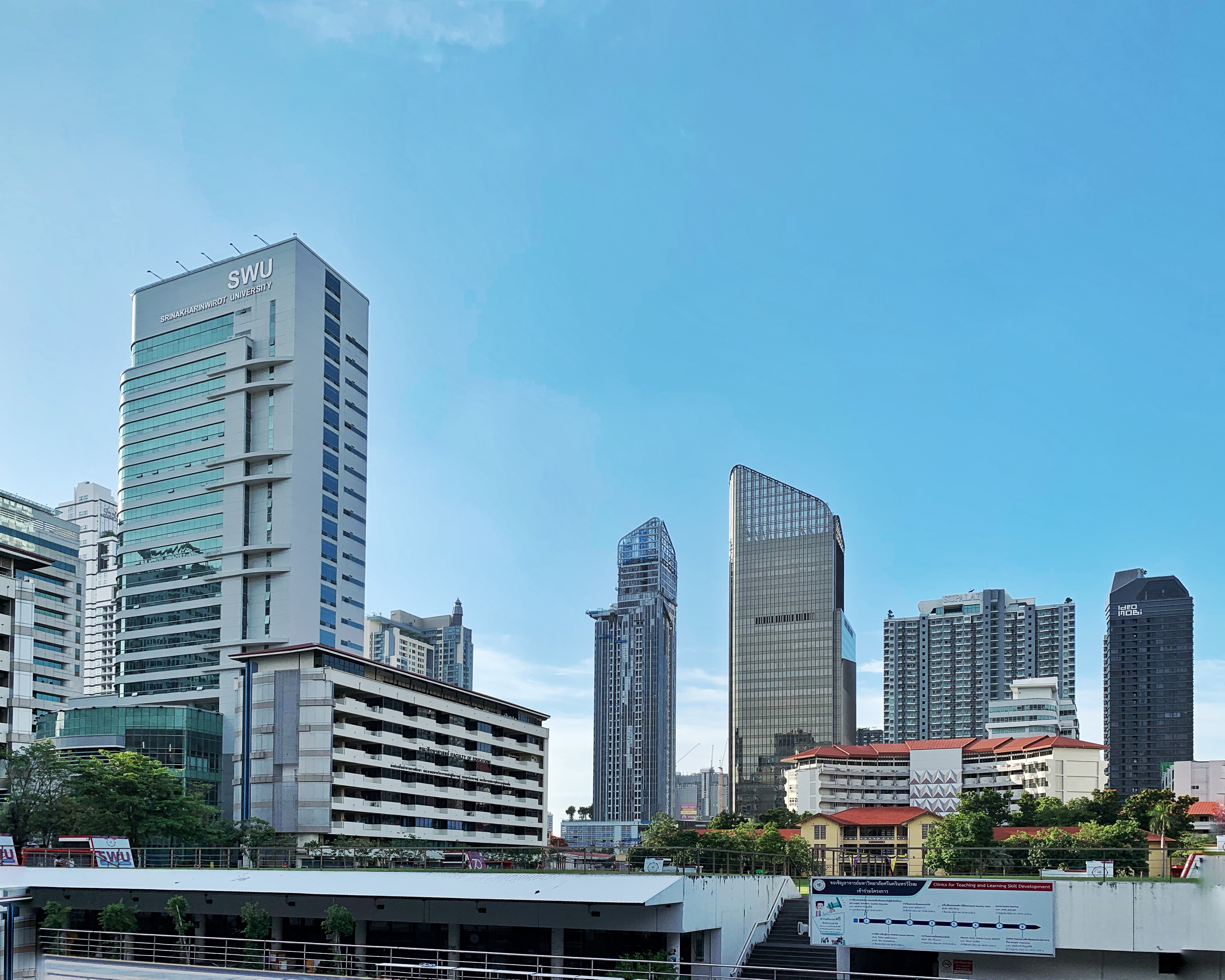
Srinakharinwirot University Prasarnmitr

Several international schools are in Watthana District, including The American School of Bangkok's Sukhumvit campus; Anglo Singapore International School's Anglo campus; Ekamai International School; NIST International School; and Wells International Kindergarten's Thong Lor campus.

=== Higher education ===
- Srinakharinwirot University - Prasarnmit Campus is on Sukhumvit 23.
- Siam Society - Established in 1904, it offers lectures, exhibits and trips for Thai and foreign residents who are interested in the study of artistic, scientific and cultural affairs of Thailand. On Asok, near Sukhumvit MRT station.
- Japan Foundation - On the 10th Floor of Sermmit Tower on Asok Montri Road, the foundation has a library, art exhibits, lectures and film screenings, primarily designed to teach Japanese culture to Thais.
- Accademia Italiana Thailand

== Diplomatic missions ==
- Embassy of Argentina
- Embassy of Bangladesh
- Embassy of Brunei
- Embassy of Egypt
- Embassy of India
- Embassy of Iran
- Embassy of Israel
- Embassy of Kenya
- Embassy of Mongolia
- Embassy of Nepal
- Embassy of Nigeria
- Embassy of Norway
- Embassy of Pakistan
- Embassy of Peru
- Embassy of Sri Lanka
