= Science Centre for Education =

Science museum in Bangkok, Thailand

Coordinates: 13°43′16″N 100°34′56″E

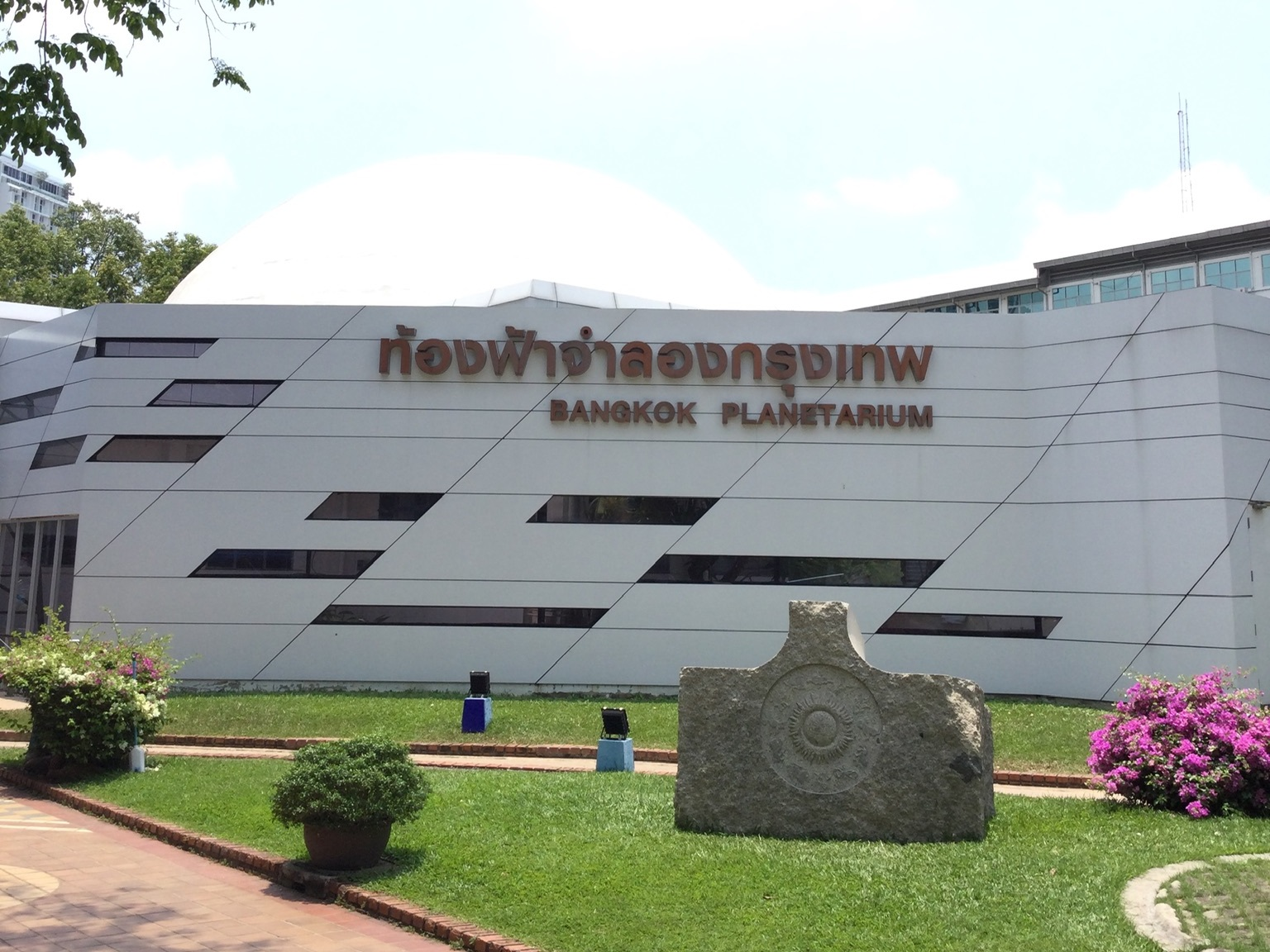

The Science Center for Education (Thai: ศูนย์วิทยาศาสตร์เพื่อการศึกษา, RTGS: Sun Witthayasat Phuea Kan Sueksa) is a science museum in Khlong Toei District, Bangkok, Thailand. It is located next to the Eastern Bus Terminal (Ekkamai) on Sukhumvit Road, and is a science exhibition center. It includes an aquarium, a computer world, a planetarium, and workshops/devices intended for children.

== History ==
The Science Center was established in 1992 by the merger of the Bangkok Planetarium which was established in 1964 and the Center for Educational Museum which was established in 1976.

== Exhibitions ==
The exhibition is divided into;

- The Planetarium hall – the semidome planetarium is the most popular permanent fixture at Bangkok Science Museum. There are presentations shown inside the hall with topics changing every 2 months.
- Exhibition hall 2 – exhibits the advancements of technologies in various fields, such as THEOS, Quickbird, Terra satellite, and more.
- Exhibition hall 3 – exhibits aquatic life; rare fish, endangered fish, freshwater fish, and saltwater fish.
- Exhibition hall 4 – exhibits the Dinosaur exhibition, the World of Insects exhibition, the Strange Life exhibition, and more.

Many of the exhibits feature modern media and some include tests and experiments, with specific activity days available for students and the general public. Highlights include an interactive pirate ship, play supermarket and the world of insects, which are most popular with young children.

== See also ==
- National Science Museum (Thailand)
