= Phra Khanong Nuea =

Phra Khanong Nuea พระโขนงเหนือ
- Khwaeng
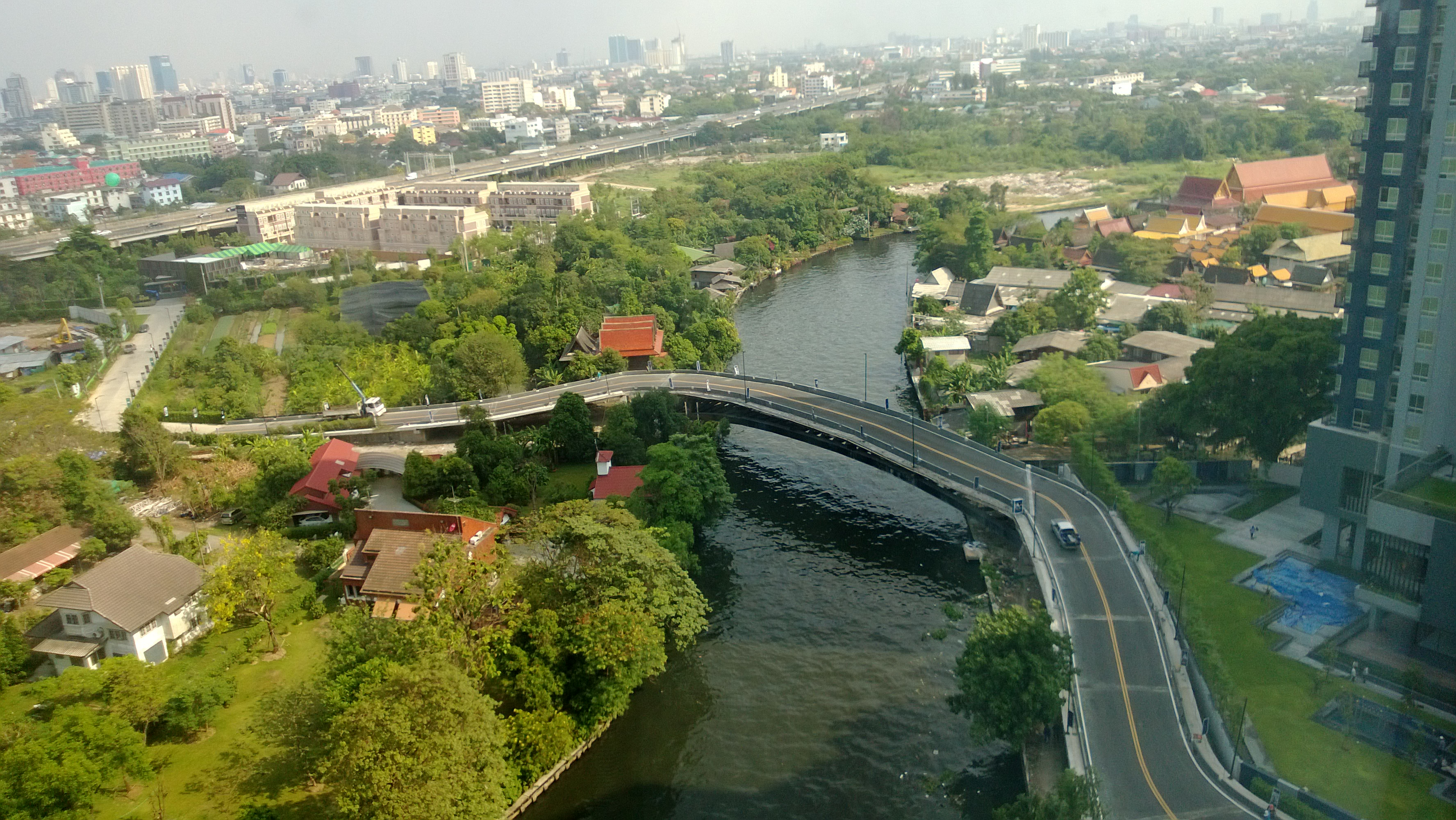
- Saphan San Samran, a bridge crossing Khlong Phra Khanong, Phra Khanong Nuea

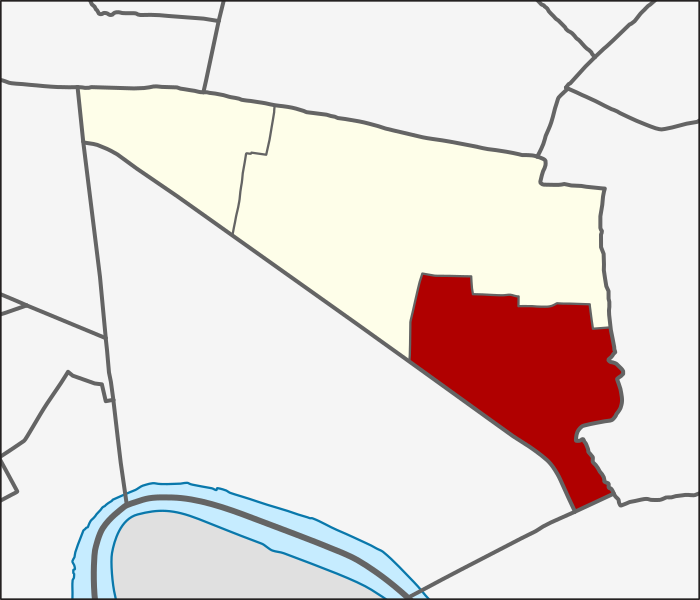
- Location in Watthana District
- Country: Thailand
- Province: Bangkok
- Khet: Watthana

Area
  - Total: 3.425 km^{2} (1.322 sq mi)

Population (2020)
  - Total: 22,339
- Time zone: UTC+7 (ICT)
- Postal code: 10110
- TIS 1099: 103903

Phra Khanong Nuea (Thai: พระโขนงเหนือ, pronounced [pʰráʔ kʰā.nǒːŋ nɯ̌a̯]) is a khwaeng (subdistrict) of Watthana District, in Bangkok, Thailand. In 2020, it had a total population of 22,339 people.
