= Bangkok Planetarium =

Planetarium in Bangkok, Thailand

Coordinates: 13°43′10″N 100°34′58″E

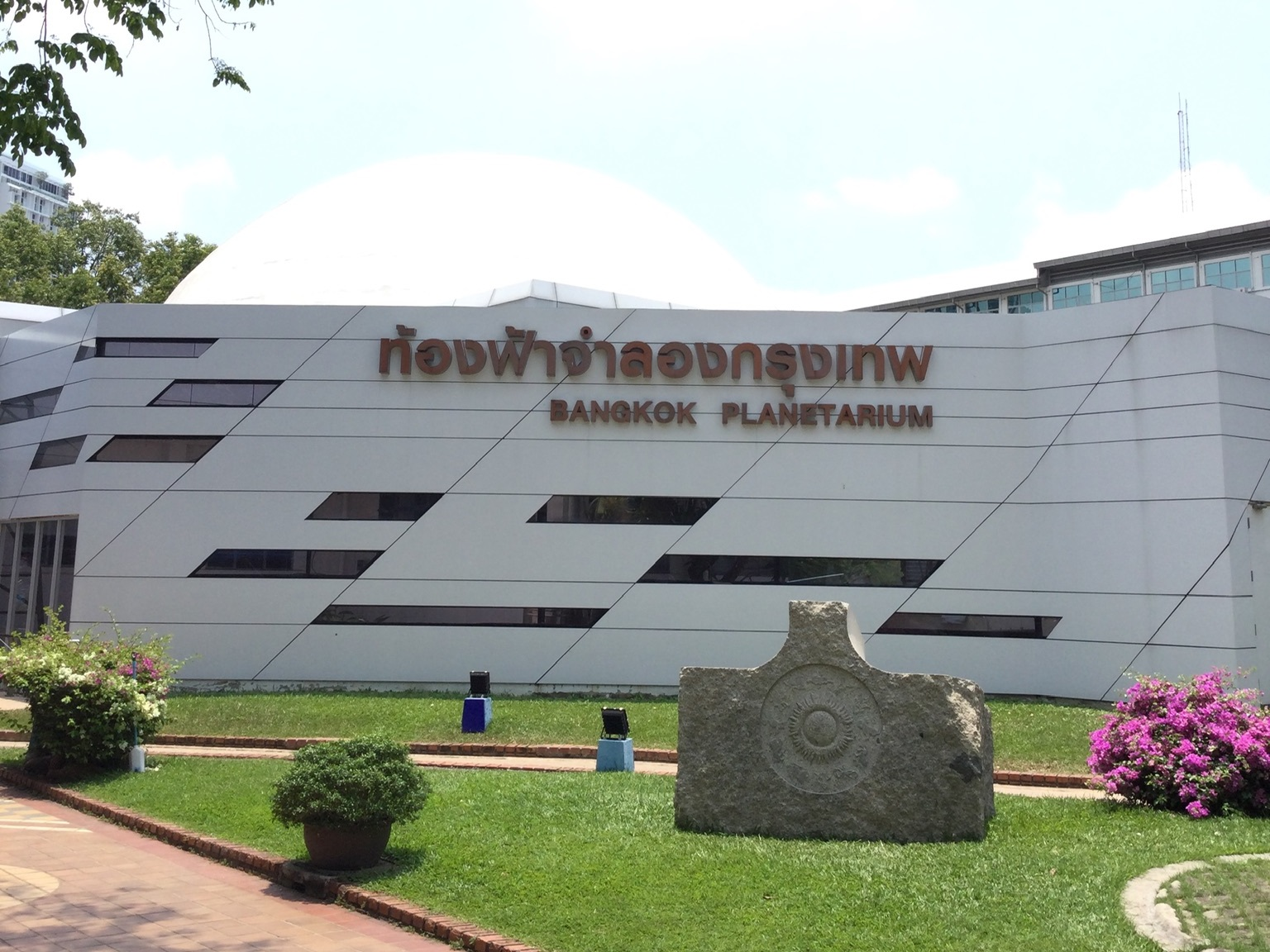
Main building of the planetarium in 2021

The Bangkok Planetarium (Thai: ท้องฟ้าจำลองกรุงเทพ, RTGS: Thong Fa Chamlong Krung Thep) is the oldest planetarium in Thailand and Southeast Asia. It is located on Sukhumvit Road in Bangkok as part of the Science Centre for Education, which is operated by the Department of Non-Formal Education of the Ministry of Education.The complex was built to educate the youth and general public about science and astronomy.

Construction of the planetarium began in 1962 with a budget of twelve million baht and it opened on 18 August 1964. The planetarium dome is 20.60 metres in diameter and 13 metres high, and holds 450 seats. The planetarium uses a Mark IV Zeiss projector, which was the first installation of a large planetarium projector in Southeast Asia. Apart from the theatre itself, the building also features permanent exhibitions on astronomy, aimed at young audiences.

The planetarium underwent extensive renovations in 2015, including the installation of two new Christie Boxer 4K30 projectors alongside the old Mark IV, which helped reignite interest in the previously ailing museum.
