= Sukhumvit Road =

Major road in Thailand

Coordinates: 13°44′34.09″N 100°33′1.46″E

National Highway 3
- ทางหลวงแผ่นดินหมายเลข 3
- ถนนสุขุมวิท; Thanon Sukhumvit

Route information
- Part of AH123 (Rayong to Border to Cambodia)
- Length: 488.387 km (303.470 mi)
- Existed: 1936–present

Major junctions
- West end: Phloen Chit Road in Pathum Wan, Bangkok
- / in Bang Na, Bangkok in Mueang Samut Prakan, Samut Prakan / in Bang Pakong, Chachoengsao / in Mueang Chonburi, Chonburi in Mueang Chonburi, Chonburi in Mueang Chonburi, Chonburi in Mueang Chonburi, Chonburi // in Si Racha, Chonburi in Bang Lamung, Chonburi in Pattaya, Bang Lamung, Chonburi in Sattahip, Chonburi in Sattahip, Chonburi / in Sattahip, Chonburi in Ban Chang, Rayong in Ban Chang, Rayong in Mueang Rayong, Rayong in Mueang Rayong, Rayong in Mueang Rayong, Rayong in Klaeng, Rayong / in Mueang Chanthaburi, Chanthaburi in Mueang Chanthaburi, Chanthaburi
- Southeast end: NH48 AH123 in Khlong Yai District, Trat, border to Cambodia

Location
- Country: Thailand
- Provinces: Bangkok, Samut Prakan, Chachoengsao, Chonburi, Rayong, Chanthaburi, Trat

Highway system
- Highways in Thailand; Motorways; Asian Highways

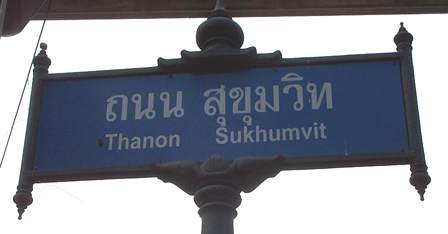
Street sign depicting the name of Sukhumvit Road (Thanon Sukhumvit) in Thai and Latin letters

Sukhumvit Road (Thai: ถนนสุขุมวิท, RTGS: Thanon Sukhumwit, pronounced [tʰā.nǒn sùʔ.kʰǔm.wít]), or Highway 3 (Thai: ทางหลวงแผ่นดินหมายเลข 3), is a major road in Thailand, and a major surface road of Bangkok and other cities. It follows a coastal route from Bangkok to Khlong Yai District, Trat border to Koh Kong, Cambodia. It is one of the four major highways of Thailand, along with Phahonyothin Road (Highway 1), Mittraphap Road (Highway 2) and Phetkasem Road (Highway 4).

Sukhumvit Road is named after the fifth chief of the Department of Highways, Phra Bisal Sukhumvit. The road was opened in 1936.

== Route ==
Sukhumvit Road begins in Bangkok, as a continuation of Rama I and Phloen Chit Roads which span Pathum Wan District. Starting from where the boundaries of the districts of Khlong Toei, Pathum Wan and Watthana meet, it runs the entire length of the border between Khlong Toei and Watthana, then passes through Phra Khanong and Bang Na districts.

It then crosses the border between Bangkok and Samut Prakan Province and subsequently continues east through Chachoengsao Province, south through Chonburi Province skirting the Khao Khiao Massif, east through Rayong Province, south-east through Chanthaburi Province, and ends at Ban Hat Lek village in Trat Province.

In Chonburi Province it passes through the towns of Chonburi, Laem Chabang, Bang Lamung township, Si Racha, and Pattaya.

=== In the Bangkok Metropolitan Area ===
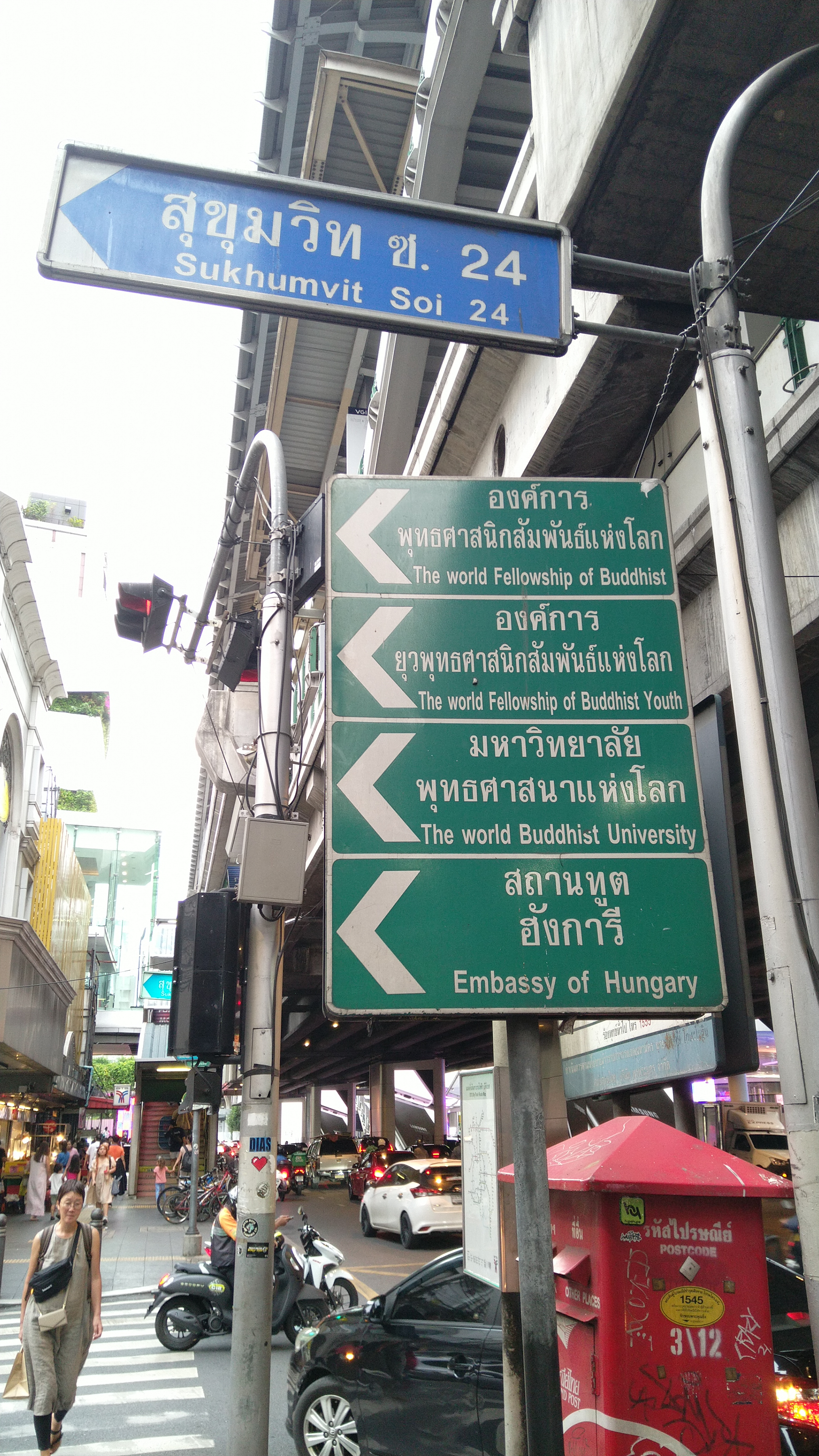
Street signs next to Phrom Phong BTS Station, on Sukhumvit Soi 24

In the capital, Sukhumvit Road serves as a main commercial street, and this section is often congested, even in the late evening or early morning hours. The Chalerm Maha Nakhon Expressway has an exit at Soi 1. Ratchadaphisek Road crosses Sukhumvit at the Asok (Asoke) intersection.

The Sukhumvit area of Bangkok is easily accessible on the Sukhumvit line of the BTS Skytrain, which runs from Khu Khot in Lam Luk Ka, Pathum Thani through the Silom Line interchange at Siam up to Kheha in the centre of Samut Prakan province. The MRT's Sukhumvit Station interchanges with the Skytrain at Asok. The Eastern portion of the Sukhumvit Line is built on top of Sukhumvit Road (including Rama I and Phloen Chit Roads) from Siam to Kheha station.

The Sois are numbered from west to east, with odd numbers branching off north-east of Sukhumvit, and even numbers branching off south-west.

The area between Sukhumvit Soi 1 and Sukhumvit Soi 63 is popular as residential area for western expatriates. Japanese nationals tend to prefer from Soi 21 Asok intersection upwards, especially Soi Thong Lo. Rentals tend to be higher in the even numbered streets between Soi 8 and Soi 28 and in the odd numbered streets between Soi 15 and Soi 39. Soi 12 is occupied mainly by Indian expatriates. The beginning of Soi 12 also has a Koreatown with several Korean restaurants and grocery stores, across the road from the Korean Cultural Centre.

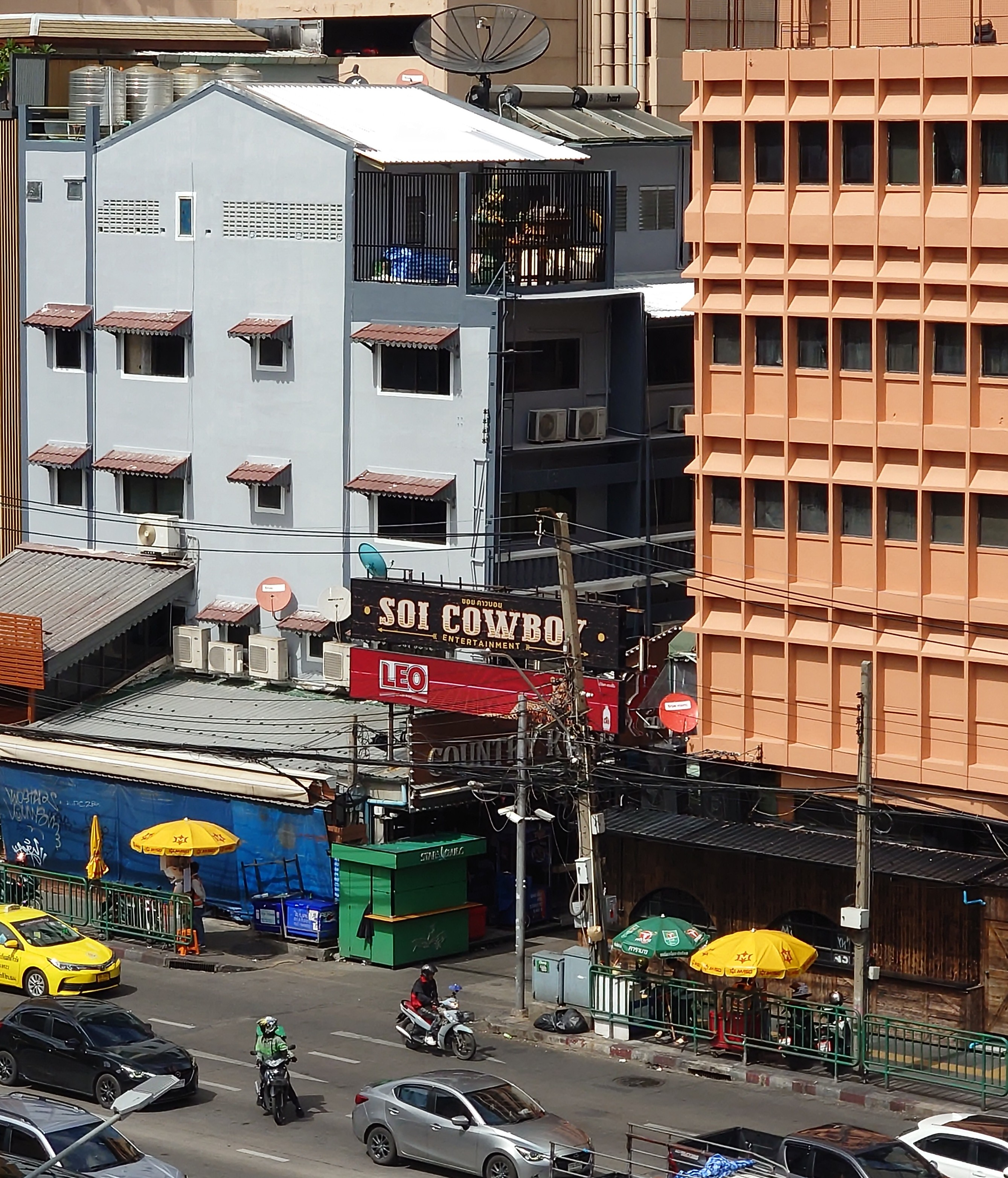
Soi Cowboy entrance on the side of Soi Sukhumvit 21

The areas of Soi Cowboy (between Soi 21, also known as Asok Montri Road, and Soi 23) and Nana Entertainment Plaza (Soi 4) are packed full of gogo bars and other places of prostitution. Restaurants of various levels of luxury exist all along the road, as well as hotels including famous names such as The Westin, JW Marriott, Sheraton, Ramada Hotel and Suites Bangkok Sukhumvit, and Four Points by Sheraton. Also several shopping malls are found, like the upscale The Emporium shopping center. It also harbours the eastern bus station at Soi 63, also known as Ekkamai Road.

Major sois off Sukhumvit Road in Bangkok and other parts:

Soi number	Soi name	Remarks	Rapid transit
odd-numbered sois
3	Nana Nuea (North Nana)	Opposite to Soi 4 Nana Tai (South Nana). Has a popular nightlife and red light district, Arab neighborhood, and a major international hospital (Bumrungrad International Hospital)	Nana BTS station
11	Chai Yot	Red-light district as the extension of Nana entertainment complex, also shortcut to neighbouring Sukhumvit Soi 13 (Saeng Chan)	
21	Asok Montri	Part of the Ratchadaphisek (Silver Jubilee) inner ring road. Terminal 21 mall is a major highlight. Close to Benjakitti Park and home to many corporate offices. Asoke is also infamous for its traffic during rush hour	Asok BTS station and Sukhumvit MRT station
23	Prasan Mit	Srinakharinwirot University campus at the end of the soi	
31	Sawatdi	The location of residence of Abhisit Vejjajiva, the 27th Prime Minister of Thailand	
39	Phrom Phong	An extension of Sukhumvit Soi 24 or Soi Kasem, the two are often referred to collectively as Soi Phrom Phong. Close to EmQuartier, EmSphere, and Emporium shopping malls, as well as Benjasiri Park	Phrom Phong BTS station
49	Klang	Location of Samitivej Hospital	
55	Thong Lo	Booming up-market residential and commercial strip; location of Pridi Banomyong Institute. Historically been a Japanese neighborhood, which extends into Phrom Phong.	
63	Ekkamai	Opposite to Bangkok Eastern Bus Terminal and Science Centre for Education with Bangkok Planetarium, shortcut to Khlong Tan the most convenient route leading to Ramkhamhaeng zone	Ekkamai BTS station
71	Pridi Phanomyong	Named after Statesman Pridi Banomyong, who ordered the road to be built	
77	On Nut	Major road linking the city with its eastern suburb of Suan Luang, Prawet, Lat Krabang and Suvarnabhumi Airport	
101	Punna Withi	Residential neighborhood. Close to True Digital Park retail center and innovation hub.	
101/1	Wachiratham Sathit		
103	Udom Suk	Shortcut to Rama IX Park and leading to Seacon Square and Paradise Park on Srinakarin Road	
105	La Salle		
107	Bearing		
113	Wat Dan Samrong		
167	Wat Chachoengsao		
even-numbered sois
22	Sai Nam Thip	Location of the girls' secondary academy Sai Nam Peung School	
24	Kasem	Starts at The Emporium shopping center	Phrom Phong BTS station
26	Ari	Namesake of Soi Ari (Phahonyothin Soi 7), near Saphan Khwai, a popular hangout spot for young people known for its many restaurants and chic cafés	
36	Napha Sap	Part of Sukhumvit Road networks of sub-sois & shortcut systems; provides easy access to Rama IV by connecting with Soi San Sabai after Soi Napha Sap 5, Landmarks: Baan Sukhumvit, SakulThai Magazine	
40	Ban Kluai Tai	Shortcut to Rama IV Road and location of Bangkok University, City Campus	
42	Kluai Nam Thai	Shortcut to Rama IV Road	
50		Exit from and access to Chalong Rat Expressway towards Kanchanaphisek Eastern Outer Ring Road via Rama IX and Raminthra Roads	
53	Padi Madi	Its name, which means 'Bon voyage', carries an auspicious connotation.	
62		Exit from and access to Chaloem Mahanakhon Expressway towards Din Daeng or Dao Khanong via Tha Ruea	

== See also ==
- Thai highway network
