= Phra Khanong =

Phra Khanong may refer to:

- Phra Khanong area, the neighbourhood in Bangkok usually referred to by the name Phra Khanong
- Phra Khanong Subdistrict in Khlong Toei District, Bangkok, which covers part of the area
- Phra Khanong Nuea Subdistrict in Watthana District, Bangkok, which covers part of the area
- Phra Khanong District in Bangkok, which formerly covered the area
- Phra Khanong Tai Subdistrict in Phra Khanong District, Bangkok, which is south of the Phra Khanong area
- Phra Khanong BTS station, which serves the neighbourhood
- Khlong Phra Khanong, a canal that flows through the Phra Khanong area and is the origin of its name
