= Mae Nak Phra Khanong =

Ghost of Thai folklore

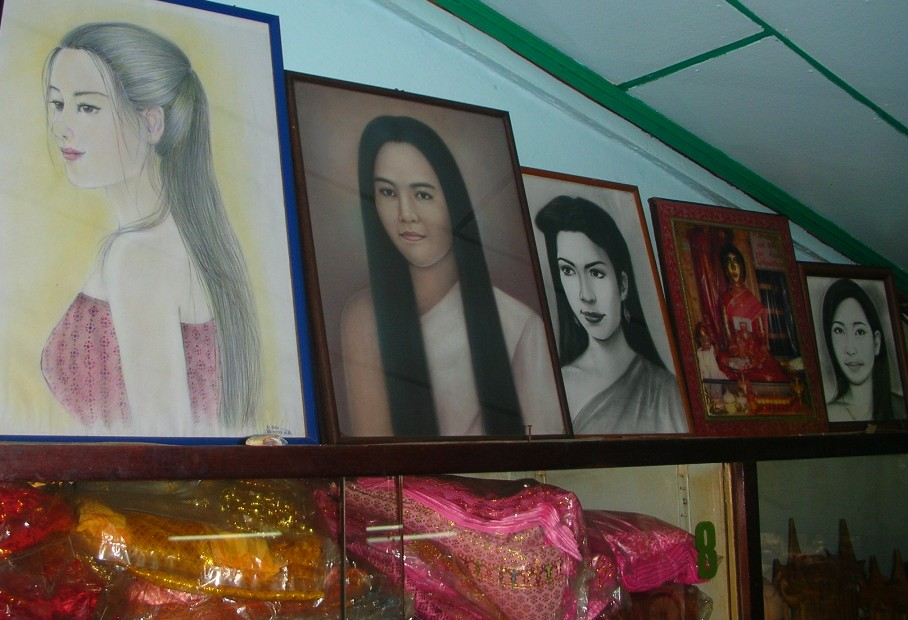
- Mae Nak shrine offerings in the inner sanctum: Portraits of the spirit and folded dresses.

Creature information
- Other name(s): Mae Nak, Nang Nak
- Grouping: Legendary creature Tutelary deity
- Sub grouping: Undead
- Similar entities: La Llorona (Mexican Folklore): A weeping mother's ghost searching for her dead children. The Kuntilanak (Malay/Indonesian Folklore): A vengeful female spirit born from childbirth death. Oiwa (Japanese Folklore): A tragic, betrayed wife who returns as a vengeful phantom. A White Lady is a type of female ghost. She is typically dressed in a white dress or similar garment, reportedly seen in rural areas and associated with local legends of tragedy.
- Folklore: Thai folk mythology

Origin
- Known for: Eternal devotion, Childbirth tragedy, and Stretching limbs.
- Country: Thailand
- Region: Phra Khanong area, Bangkok
- Details: The legend of Mae Nak Phra Khanong, set in 19th-century Thailand, tells of a woman named Nak who dies during childbirth and continues to live with her husband, Mak, as a spirit. When Mak discovers this, he perform the last rites of her wife and child, to free them from this world.

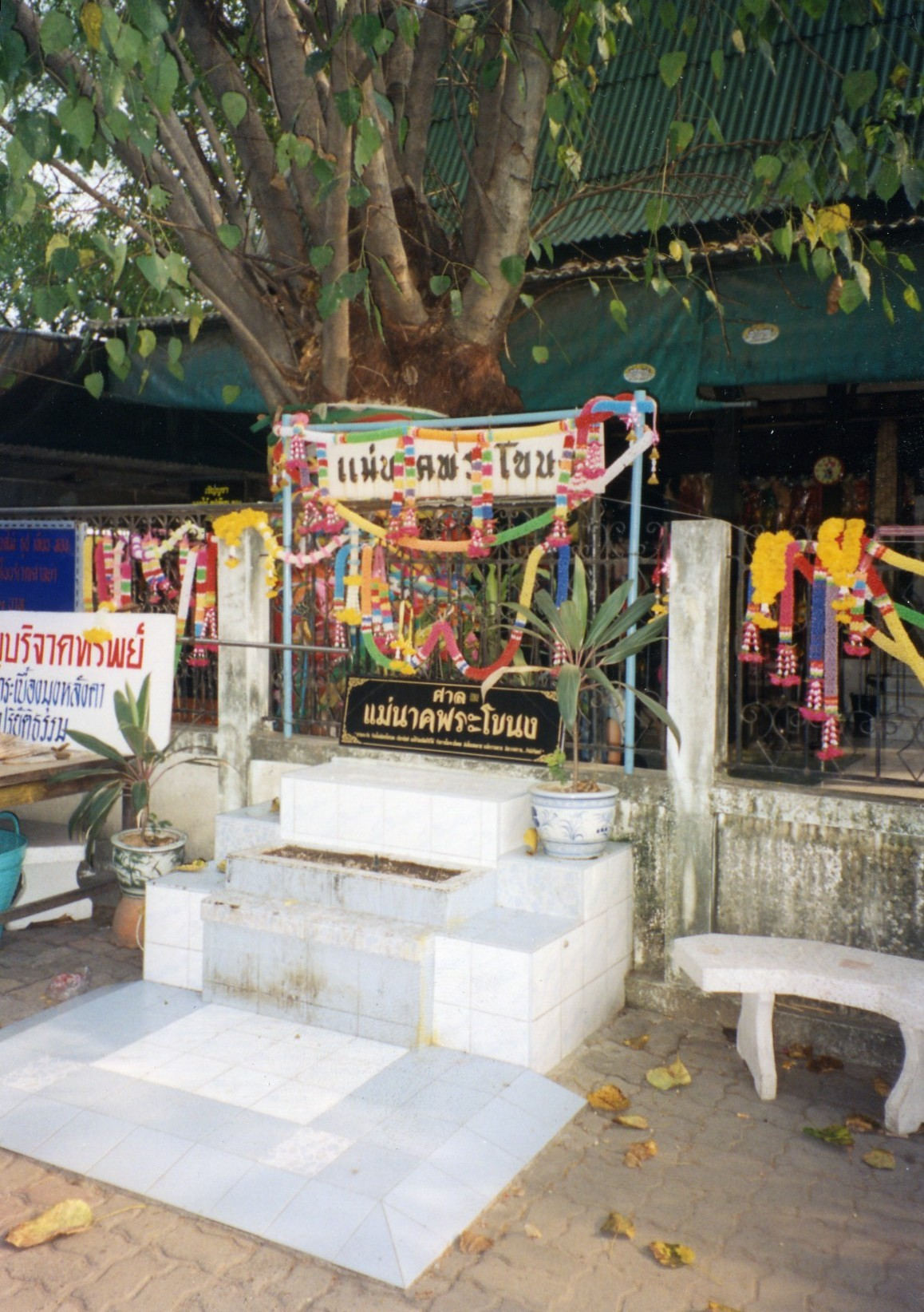
Shrine to Mae Nak Phra Khanong, Wat Mahabut

Mae Nak Phra Khanong (Thai: แม่นากพระโขนง, lit. 'Lady Nak of Phra Khanong'), or simply Mae Nak (แม่นาก, 'Lady Nak') or Nang Nak (นางนาก, 'Miss Nak'), is a well-known Thai ghost. According to local folklore the story is based on events that took place during the reign of King Rama IV.

A shrine dedicated to Nak was constructed at Wat Mahabut. In 1997, the shrine was relocated to the nearby Suan Luang district of modern Bangkok.

== Common legend ==
A beautiful young woman named Mae Nak, who lived on the banks of the Phra Khanong Canal, had an undying love for her husband, Mak.

While Nak was pregnant, Mak was conscripted into the Thai Army and sent to war where he was seriously wounded (in some versions it is the Kengtung Wars, while others are not specific). While he was being nursed back to health in central Bangkok, Nak and their child both died during childbirth. But when Mak returned home, he found his loving wife and child waiting for him. Neighbours warned him that he was living with a ghost but he rebuffed them.

One day, as Nak was preparing nam phrik, she dropped a lime off the porch. In her haste to retrieve it, she stretched her arm to an impossible length to pick it up from the ground below. Upon seeing this, Mak realised his wife was a ghost. That night, Mak sneaked out the house and fled with Nak in pursuit. According to Thai folklore, ghosts are afraid of sticky Blumea leaves so Mak hid behind a Blumea balsamifera (Thai: หนาด, romanised: nat) bush. He then ran into Wat Mahabut temple, which as holy ground, a ghost cannot enter.

In her grief, Nak terrorised the people of Phra Khanong, furious at them for causing Mak to leave her. However, a powerful monk captured Nak's ghost; and after confining her in an earthen jar, threw it into the Phra Khanong canal.

There are regional variations to the rest of the story. In one, an old couple new to Phra Khanong find the jar while fishing; in another two fishermen dredge up the jar. In both cases, Nak is freed when the jar is opened.

In alternative versions, a venerable monk named Somdet Phra Phutthachan (To Phrommarangsi) defeats Nak by confining her spirit in the bone of her forehead and binds it to his waistband. Legend says the waistband is currently in the possession of the Thai royal family. Admiral Prince Abhakara Kiartivongse, Prince of Chumphon, also claimed to have had the relic. In another, the monk assured Nak that in a future life she would be reunited with her beloved husband, so she voluntarily departed for the afterlife.

== Research ==
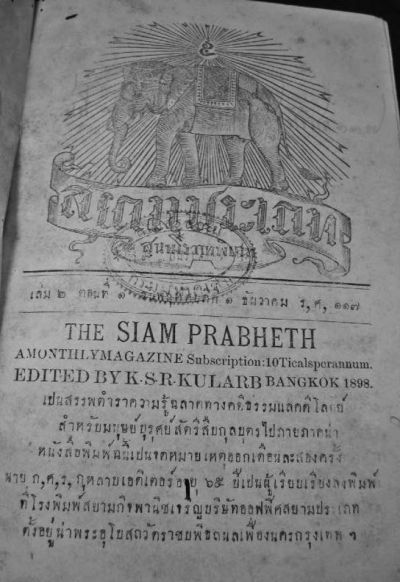
"The Siam Prabheth", real document the time and after Mae Nak Phra Khanong was alive

Anek Nawikamul, a Thai historian, researched the story and found an article in The Siam Prabheth newspaper written by K.S.R. Kulap, dated 10 March 1899. Kulap claimed the story of Mae Nak was based on the life of Amdaeng Nak (Thai: อำแดงนาก, lit. 'Mrs Nak'), daughter of a Tambon Phra Khanong leader named Khun Si. Amdaeng Nak died while she was pregnant. Their son, worried that his father might remarry and his inheritance shared with his step-mother, invented the ghost story. He dressed in women's clothing and threw rocks at passing boats to make people think it was Nak's ghost. Kulap also suggested that Nak's husband was named Chum, not Mak.

== Mae Nak Shrine ==
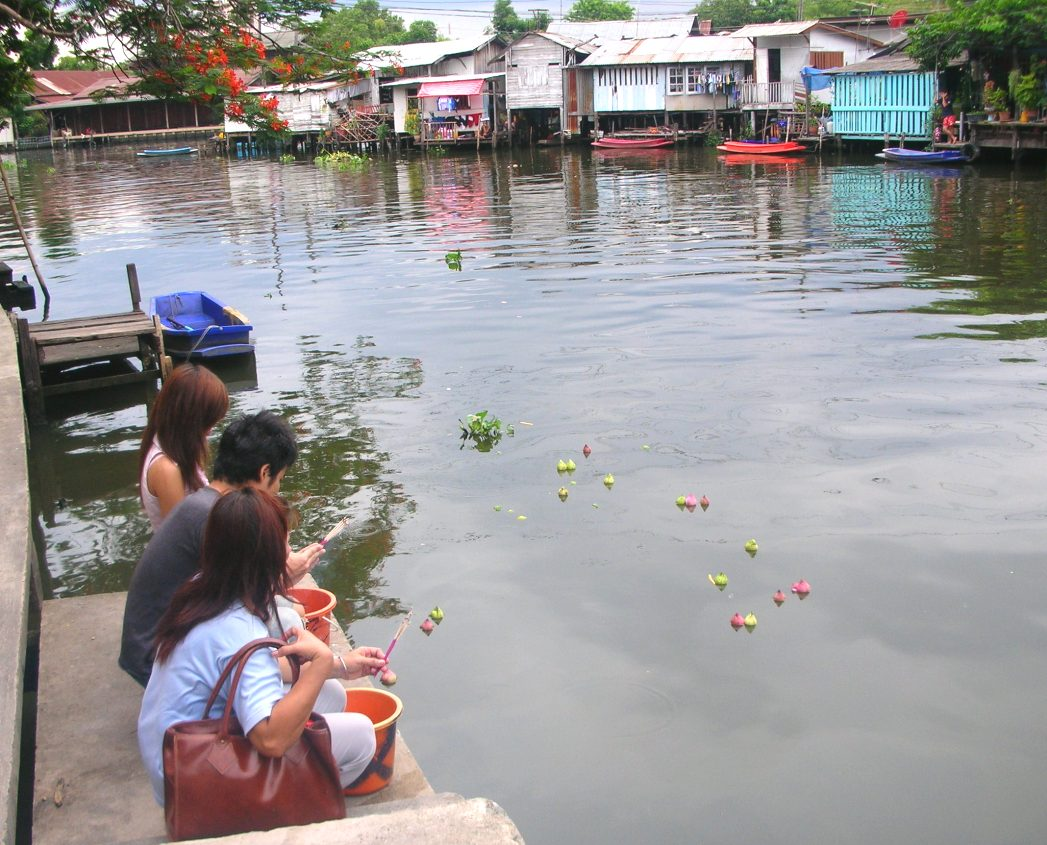
Mae Nak Phra Khanong Shrine, offerings of lotus buds and releasing of live fishes, Phra Khanong Canal

The shrine of Mae Nak stands next to Klong Phra Khanong, at Wat Mahabut, a large temple on Soi 77 off Sukhumvit Road (On Nut Road). The shrine is a low building under large trees with a roof that encompasses the tree trunks. The main shrine has several minor shrines around it.

A statue of Mae Nak and her infant form the centrepiece of the shrine. Devotees often make offerings, accompanied by a request for help, generally by women seeking easy childbirth or for their husband to be exempted from military conscription. Offerings are usually lengths of coloured cloth, wrapped around the trunk of the Bo tree. Other offerings include fruit, lotuses, and incense sticks. Toys for her child and portraits of the ghost are displayed in the shrine's inner sanctum. A collection of fine dresses offered to her are displayed behind her statue.

Offerings are also made at Phra Khanong Canal, where fish purchased live at markets are brought in buckets to the edge of the canal and freed. Stalls at the shrine sell toys, fish, lotus buds, incense sticks, and garlands for those who wish to make an offering.

== In popular culture ==
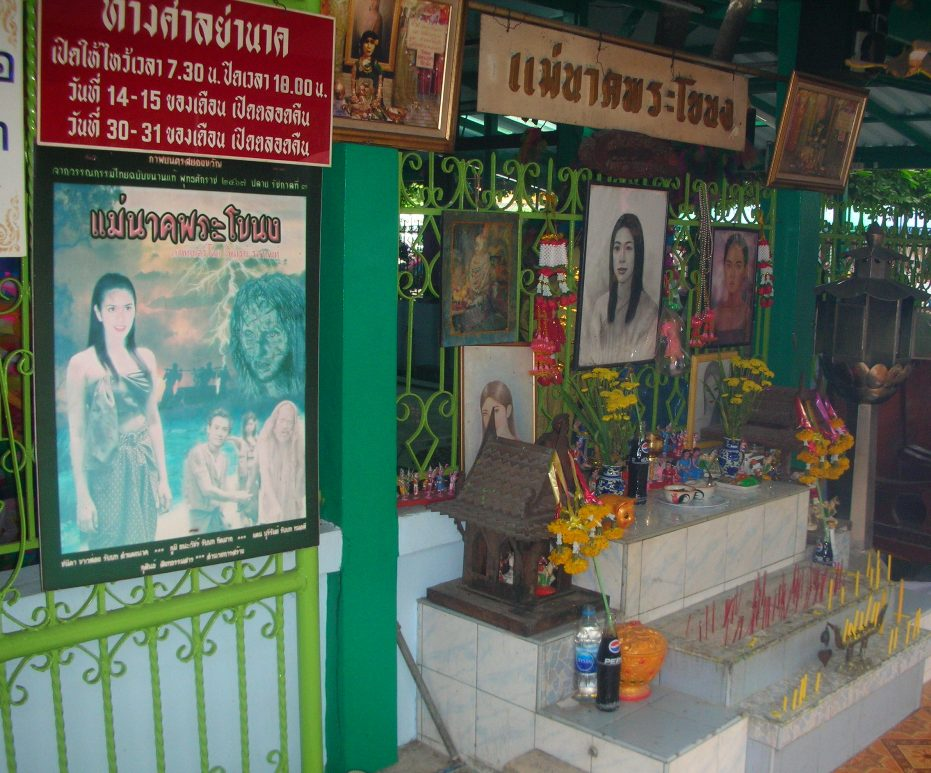
Inside the Mae Nak Phra Khanong shrine compound, the canal side

Mae Nak's story has enjoyed sustained popularity because her undying devotion to her husband inspires people of all ages. Prince Damrong, a son of King Mongkut, revealed that when he was a child, he kept asking Wat Phra Kaeo visitors who was the most popular person in their opinion, and most people answered "Mae Nak".

The story of Mae Nak Phra Khanong is also the subject of many films, television series, and printed media. Among these are:

- Mae Nak Phra Khanong, a 1959 Thai film directed by Rangsi Thatsanaphayak
- Mae Nak Khuen Chip, 1960 Thai film directed by Anumat Bunnag
- Winyan Rak Mae Nak Phra Khanong, a 1962 Thai film directed by Daeng (Seni) Gomarachun
- Mae Nak Khanong Rak, 1968 Thai film directed by Chumphon Theppitak
- Mae Nak Phra Nakhon, a 1970 Thai film directed by Anusorn Mongkolkarn [Note: this is NOT a transliteration error.]
- Mae Nak Phra Khanong, 29 June 1973 Thai film directed by Suriya Duangthongdee
- Mae Nak Alawad (Mae Nak Rampage), 31 August 1973 Thai film directed by Suriya Duangthongdee
- Mae Nak Amerika, aka The Pot, 1975 Thai film directed by Lek Kitaparaporn
- Mae Nak Buk Tokiao, 1976 Thai film
- Mae Nak Phra Khanong, 1978 Thai film
- Sannya Chai Mae Nak Phra Khanong (RTGS: San-ya Chai Mae Nak Phra Khanong), 1992 Thai film
- Mae Nak Choe Phi Pop (Mae Nak meets Phi Pop), 1992 Thai TV series
- Nang Nak, a 1999 film by Thai director Nonzee Nimibutr
- Ghost of Mae Nak, a 2005 Thai film by British director Mark Duffield
- Mae Naak, (แม่นาก) an opera composed by Somtow Sucharitkul. It premiered in 2003 and was revived in 2005 by the Bangkok Opera, with soprano Nancy Yuen performing the title role and baritone Kyu Won Han as Mak in both productions. It was restaged again in 2011 in Bangkok and London.
- Nak (นาค), a Thai 2008 animated film.
- Maenak Prakanong the Musical, a 2009 musical directed by Takonkiet Viravan and starring Myria Benedetti and Anatpol Sirichumsang.
- Mae Nak Patha Pop Sam Tua, a 2011 comedy.
- Mae Nak 3D, a 2012 Thai film
- Pee Mak, (พี่มาก..พระโขนง), a 2013 comedy horror Thai film by GMM Tai Hub
- Make Me Shudder 2 (Shudder Me Mae Nak), a 2014 Thai film
- The Legend of Nang Nak, a 2024 Thai drama series
- Nak Loves Mak Sooo Much!, a 2025 comedy film directed by Choosak Eamsuk and starring Narilya Gulmongkolpech, Petchtai Wongkamlao, Pongsak Pongsuwan.
- Pee Mak, a 2026 Filipino comedy film adaptation directed by Victor Villanueva and starring Bea Binene, Wilbert Ross, Vandolph, TJ Valderrama, Gian Bernardino, and Jairus Aquino.

Representations of Mae Nak, sometimes humorous, are very common in Thai comic books, animated cartoons, and video games too. In the mobile puzzle game, Penny & Flo, the story of Mae Nak is present, except Mae Nak is renamed as Mae Noi.

== See also ==
- Ghosts in Thai culture
- Lang Suir
- Tai Thong Klom
- Churel
