= Siam Sinfonietta =

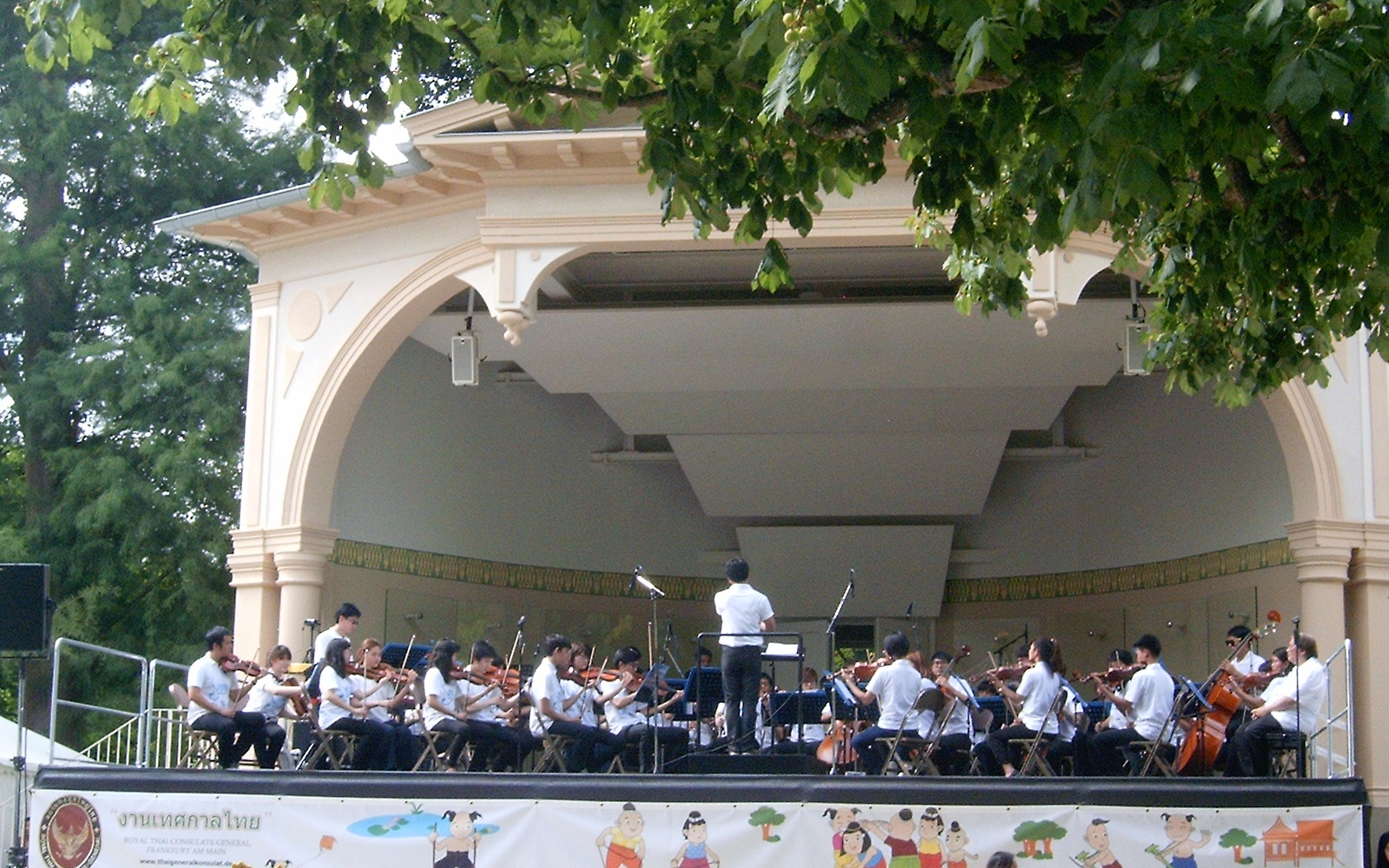
Siam Sinfonietta at the Thai Festival 2015

Siam Sinfonietta is a youth orchestra founded in 2010 by Thai-American composer Somtow Sucharitkul, Thai conductor Trisdee na Patalung, and the Bangkok Opera Foundation. It was created in order to provide intensive training for young Thai musicians intending to have a serious career in classical music. The orchestra operates out of the offices of the Bangkok Opera Foundation.

The orchestra came into existence at the first "Bach to the Future: Science through Music" camp and immediately embarked on a series of concerts in Bangkok, particularly concerts for young audiences and concerts that served to introduce classical music to new audiences. It has toured extensively in Thailand and in its second year plans more international touring as well. Some high-profile events the Siam Sinfonietta has participated in include the "Together We Can" concert to raise awareness of the governor of Bangkok's initiative for reconciliation after the 2010 unrest in downtown Bangkok, and the "Introducing the Symphony" series at Bangkok's Art and Culture Center, populist concert-lectures about music.

The orchestra holds annual auditions for young musicians aged 16–24. A number of its members are also members of full-fledged professional orchestras such as the Siam Philharmonic Orchestra and the Bangkok Symphony Orchestra. It has twice performed in conjunction with the Siam Philharmonic Orchestra: in the Thailand premiere of Mahler's Third Symphony, and at a gala concert in front of CentralWorld in Ratchaprasong, Bangkok, the site of the 2010 troubles, as part of an event to promote "Healing through Harmony."

The sinfonietta is funded largely by private and corporate sponsorships.

On 8 July 2012, the two-year-old orchestra won first place at the Summa Cum Laude International Youth Music Festival in the symphony orchestra category. The next year, the orchestra toured in California and performed at Young Euro Classic in Berlin, Germany; this was followed in 2014 by performances in Carnegie Hall and another trip to Berlin, Prague and Abu Dhabi under the auspices of the Thai Ministry of Foreign Affairs.

In August 2015 the orchestra performed at the Festival junger Künstler in Bayreuth and at the Thai Festival in Bad Homburg, Germany.

The orchestra has also appeared on film, first in 2021's The Maestro, a Thai horror film starring Somtow as a murderous conductor, and in the surprising denouement of 2022's Tár (cited as a Filipino orchestra in the screenplay).

== See also ==
- List of youth orchestras
