= Trisdee na Patalung =

Thai composer and conductor

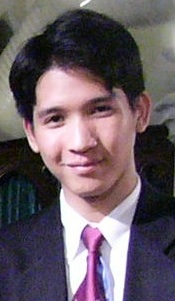
Trisdee na Patalung

Trisdee na Patalung (Thai: ทฤษฎี ณ พัทลุง; RTGS: Thritsadi Na Phatthalung; born 9 March 1986) is a Thai composer and conductor. He is the music director of the Bangkok Baroque Ensemble and the Resident Conductor of the Orpheus Choir of Bangkok.

Na Patalung began studying music at the age of 13. At the age of 15, he stopped his formal education when he met Somtow Sucharitkul, who became his teacher and mentor. At the same time, he began working for the Bangkok Opera as a repetiteur and an assistant conductor.

Na Patalung made his operatic conducting debut in 2006 in a performance of Mozart's The Magic Flute.

He has written two symphonies that he also conducted with the Siam Philharmonic Orchestra. He has worked regularly with the Opera Studio Nederland since 2005 and became a permanent member in 2006.

In 2008, his composition Eternity was performed during the funeral of Princess Galyani Vadhana. In 2009, he made his Italian debut conducting Rossini's opera Il viaggio a Reims at the Rossini Festival in Pesaro.

In July 2011, na Patalung conducted the second revival performance of Sucharitkul's opera Mae Naak based on the Thai ghost story of the same name at the Sala Chalermkrung Royal Theatre in Bangkok. He also conducted the London premiere of this work at the Bloomsbury Theatre, London, in September 2011.

On July 27, 2011, na Patalung conducted the Orchestra Sinfonica Nazionale della Rai at the Organalia music festival in Turin, Italy.
