= Mae Naak (opera) =

Mae Naak is a 2003 opera composed by Thai composer Somtow Sucharitkul to an English libretto based on one of Thailand's best known ghost stories Mae Nak Phra Khanong. The story is also the basis for Nonzee Nimibutr's popular film Nang Nak.

The opera's title role was created by Hong Kong born soprano Nancy Yuen who reprised the role in a 2005 production at the Thailand Cultural Center, Seoul born baritone Kyu Won Han as Maak, directed by Henry Akina, artistic director of the Hawaii Opera Theatre. Both productions were designed by prominent Thai avant-garde artist Sumet Jumsai.

The opera's London premiere was on September 15, 2011, at the Bloomsbury Theatre in London. Nancy Yuen again reprised the role. The 2003 production was revived by Stefan Sanchez and the opera was conducted by Trisdee na Patalung.

== Sources ==
- Mae Naak: Review by Ken Smith in Opera Magazine, January 2006
