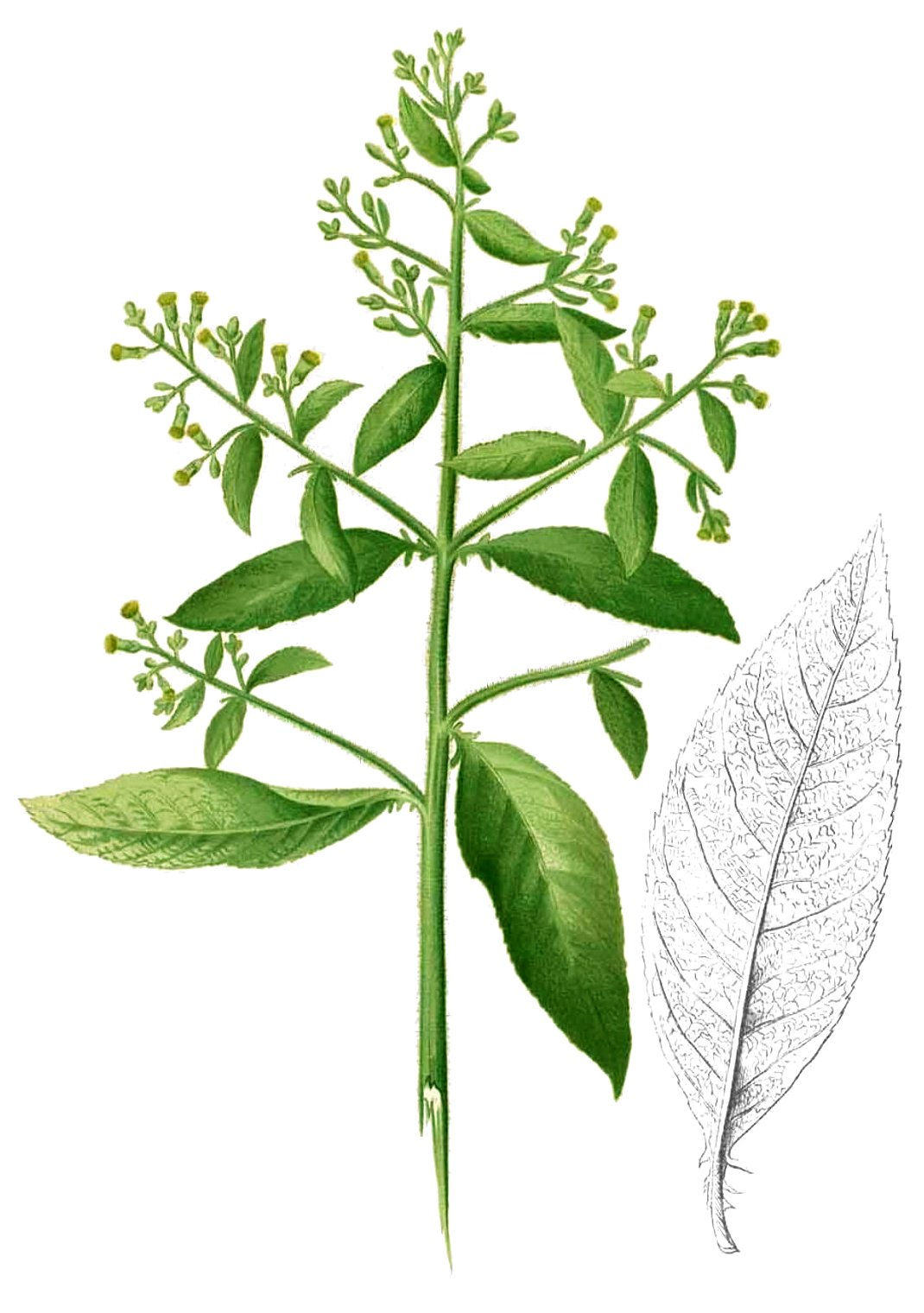
- Sambong (Blumea balsamifera)

Scientific classification
- Kingdom: Plantae
- Clade: Embryophytes
- Clade: Tracheophytes
- Clade: Angiosperms
- Clade: Eudicots
- Clade: Asterids
- Order: Asterales
- Family: Asteraceae
- Subfamily: Asteroideae
- Tribe: Inuleae
- Genus: Blumea; DC. (1883), conserved name, not Rchb. (1828) (Malvaceae) nor G.Don (1831) (Actinidiaceae)

Type species
- Blumea balsamifera (L.) DC.

Synonyms
- Bileveillea Vaniot; Blumea section Apterae DC.; Blumeopsis Gagnep.; Conyza subgenus Blumea (DC.) DC. ex Miq.; Cyathocline Cass.; Doellia Sch.Bip.; Leveillea Vaniot; Nanothamnus Thomson; Placus Lour.

= Blumea =

Genus of flowering plants

Blumea is a genus of flowering plants of the family Asteraceae.

== Characteristics ==
Genus Blumea is found in the tropical and sub-tropical zones of Asia, especially the Indian subcontinent and Southeast Asia. A few species are found in Australia and still fewer in Africa.

The plants of this genus are mostly relatively small weeds. Some of them are ruderal species.

A few of the species were formerly included in genus Conyza.

Many species of genus Blumea are used in traditional Chinese medicine. Other uses include as decorative dry plants.

Blumea balsamifera (Nat; หนาด) is reputed to ward off spirits in Thai folklore, and is used in Philippines herbal medicine as well.

Blumea axillaris (syn. Blumea mollis) leaf essential oil contains linalool (c. 19%), γ-elemene (c. 12%), copaene (c. 11%), estragole (c.11%), allo-ocimene (c. 10%), γ-terpinene (8%) and allo-aromadendrene (c. 7%). The essential oil had significant toxic effect against early fourth-instar larvae of Culex quinquefasciatus with LC_{50} = 71.71 and LC_{90} = 143.41 ppm.

== Other uses of the name ==
Blumea is also the name of the Journal of Plant Taxonomy and Plant Geography published by the National Herbarium of the Netherlands.

== Species ==
As of June 2025, Plants of the World Online accepted the following species:

- Blumea adamsii J.-P.Lebrun & Stork
- Blumea adenophora Franch.
- Blumea afra (DC.) O.Hoffm.
- Blumea angustifolia Thwaites
- Blumea arfakiana Martelli
- Blumea arnakidophora Mattf.
- Blumea aromatica DC.
- Blumea atropurpurea Haines
- Blumea axillaris (Lam.) DC.
- Blumea balfourii Hemsl.
- Blumea balsamifera (L.) DC.
- Blumea barbata DC.
- Blumea belangeriana DC.
- Blumea benthamiana Domin
- Blumea bicolor Merr.
- Blumea bifoliata (L.) DC.
- Blumea borneensis S.Moore
- Blumea bovei (DC.) Vatke
- Blumea braunii (Vatke) J.-P.Lebrun & Stork
- Blumea bullata J.Kost.
- Blumea canalensis S.Moore
- Blumea celebica Boerl.
- Blumea chishangensis S.W.Chung, Z.Hao Chen, S.H.Liu & W.J.Huang
- Blumea confertiflora Merr.
- Blumea conspicua Hayata
- Blumea crinita Arn.
- Blumea densiflora DC.
- Blumea diffusa R.Br. ex Benth.
- Blumea eriantha DC.
- Blumea fistulosa (Roxb.) Kurz
- Blumea flava DC.
- Blumea formosana Kitam.
- Blumea hamiltonii DC.
- Blumea heudelotii (C.D.Adams) Lisowski
- Blumea hieraciifolia (Spreng.) DC. - hawkweed leaf blumea
- Blumea hirsuta (Less.) M.R.Almeida
- Blumea hossei Craib ex Hosseus
- Blumea hsinbaiyangensis S.S.Ying
- Blumea htamanthii C.X.Yang & Y.Luo
- Blumea humilis S.S.Ying
- Blumea incisa Merr.
- Blumea integrifolia DC.
- Blumea intermedia J.Kost.
- Blumea junghuhniana (Miq.) Boerl.
- Blumea lacera (Burm.f.) DC. - Malay blumea
- Blumea laevis (Lour.) Merr.
- Blumea lanceolaria (Roxb.) Druce
- Blumea lanceolata Warb.
- Blumea linearis C.I Peng & W.P.Leu
- Blumea longipes Merr.
- Blumea luoshaoensis S.S.Ying
- Blumea lutea (J.S.Law ex Wight) K.C.Mohan
- Blumea macrostachya DC.
- Blumea malcolmii Hook.f.
- Blumea manilaliana (C.P.Raju & R.R.V.Raju) K.C.Mohan
- Blumea manillensis DC.
- Blumea martiniana Vaniot
- Blumea megacephala (Randeria) C.T.Chang & C.H.Yu
- Blumea membranacea DC.
- Blumea milnei Seem.
- Blumea mindanaensis Merr.
- Blumea moluccana Boerl.
- Blumea napifolia DC.
- Blumea obliqua (L.) Druce
- Blumea oblongifolia Kitam.
- Blumea obovata DC.
- Blumea oxyodonta DC. – spiny leaved blumea
- Blumea papuana S.Moore
- Blumea psammophila Dunlop
- Blumea pungens W.Fitzg.
- Blumea ramosii Merr.
- Blumea repanda (Roxb.) Hand.-Mazz.
- Blumea riparia DC.
- Blumea sagittata Gagnep.
- Blumea saussureoides C.C.Chang & Y.Q.Tseng ex Y.Ling & Y.Q.Tseng
- Blumea saxatilis Zoll. & Moritzi
- Blumea scabrifolia Ridl.
- Blumea sericea (Thomson) Anderb. & A.K.Pandey
- Blumea sessiliflora Decne.
- Blumea sikkimensis Hook.f.
- Blumea sinuata (Lour.) Merr.
- Blumea stenophylla Merr.
- Blumea stricta (DC.) Anderb. & Bengtson
- Blumea subalpina Lauterb.
- Blumea sumbavensis Boerl.
- Blumea sylvatica (Blume) DC.
- Blumea tenella DC.
- Blumea tenuifolia C.Y.Wu
- Blumea ternatensis Boerl.
- Blumea timorensis DC. ex Decne.
- Blumea vanoverberghii Merr.
- Blumea venkataramanii R.S.Rao & Hemadri
- Blumea veronicifolia Franch.
- Blumea vestita Kitam.
- Blumea viminea DC.
- Blumea virens DC.
- Blumea zeylanica Grierson

== Bibliography ==
- John Lindley & Thomas Moore, The treasury of botany
