= Blumea tenella =

Scientific classification
- Kingdom: Plantae
- Clade: Tracheophytes
- Clade: Angiosperms
- Clade: Eudicots
- Clade: Asterids
- Order: Asterales
- Family: Asteraceae
- Genus: Blumea
- Species: B. tenella

Binomial name
- Blumea tenella DC.

Species of flowering plant

Blumea tenella is a flowering plant in the family Asteraceae found in northern Australia from Queensland through the Northern Territory to Western Australia. It is also found in Indonesia, Borneo, New Guinea and New Caledonia.

Blumella tenella is an aromatic herb with yellow flowers, growing from 3 to 40 cm high. It is found on rocky or loam soils and on cracking clay on river flood plains, near creeks and swamps.

Blumea tenella was first described in 1834 by Augustin Pyramus de Candolle.

The Walmajarri people of the southern Kimberley call this plant Ngurnungurna.
