= Vampire Junction =

1984 novel by S. P. Somtow

- First edition (publ. Starblaze)
- Author: S. P. Somtow
- Illustrator: Cecilia Cosentini
- Cover artist: Val Lindahn
- Language: English
- Genre: Horror
- Publisher: Starblaze
- Publication date: 1984
- Publication place: United States
- Pages: 280
- ISBN: 9780898653670

Vampire Junction is a horror novel by Thai writer S. P. Somtow, published in 1984. It is the first in a series about Timmy Valentine, a 12-year-old rock star who is actually a 2,000-year-old vampire. Unpublished for many years and rejected by over two dozen publishers, the novel uses a novel narrative technique inspired by the rapid intercutting of MTV music videos, and features a high level of the imagery from splatter films. Later, the book was published by Berkley/Ace and Tor Books, and has remained in print ever since.

The novel was voted one of the "forty all-time greatest horror books" by the Horror Writers Association. It has currently been reissued by Diplodocus Press. S. P. Somtow has written two sequels to Vampire Junction, Valentine and Vanitas.
