= The Riverrun Trilogy =

The Riverrun Trilogy is a 1996 novel written by S. P. Somtow.

== Plot summary ==
The Riverrun Trilogy is a novel in which a surreal, genre-blending journey moves through overlapping realities. The three novels (Riverrun (1991), Armorica (1992), and Yestern (1996)) chronicle the strange and metaphysical adventures of Theo Etchison, an ordinary boy drawn into a cosmic struggle between forces vying to exploit his rare gift of truthsaying. His experiences unfold across two planes: one a conventional American horror setting and the other a fantastical realm of dragons, alternate dimensions, and psychological chaos. Interlaced with philosophical musings and spiritual symbolism, the story incorporates figures like Jesus, King Lear, and Krishna, and fuses Thai and Western cultural elements to explore identity and inner peace. The narrative plays with madness and dream logic.

== Reception ==
Jonathan Palmer reviewed The Riverrun Trilogy for Arcane magazine, rating it a 7 out of 10 overall, and stated that "Somtow blends Thai and English, as well as Hindu and Judaeo-Christian, to suggest that we must find and accept our true selves in order to find peace. These books are better read at night, preferably all night."
