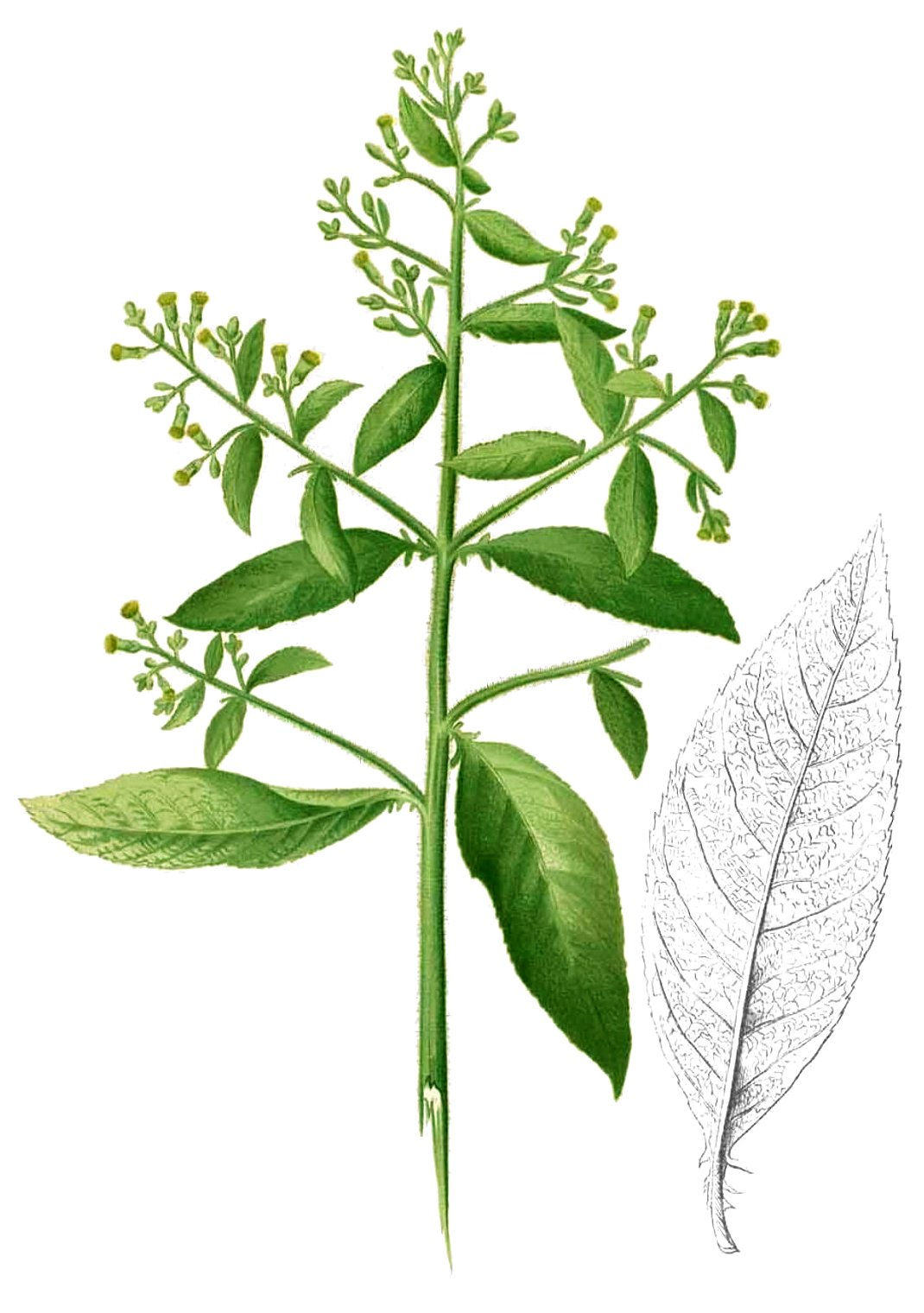
- Sambong (Blumea balsamifera)

Scientific classification
- Kingdom: Plantae
- Clade: Tracheophytes
- Clade: Angiosperms
- Clade: Eudicots
- Clade: Asterids
- Order: Asterales
- Family: Asteraceae
- Genus: Blumea
- Species: B. balsamifera

Binomial name
- Blumea balsamifera (L.) DC.

= Blumea balsamifera =

Species of flowering plant

Blumea balsamifera is a flowering plant belonging to the genus Blumea of the family Asteraceae. It is also known as Ngai camphor and sambong (also sembung).

== Description ==
In the Philippines, where it is most commonly known as sambong, Blumea balsamifera is used in traditional herbal medicine for the common cold and as a diuretic. It is also used for infected wounds, respiratory infections, and stomach pains in Thai and Chinese folk medicine.

The genus Blumea is found in the tropical and sub-tropical zones of Asia, especially the Indian subcontinent and Southeast Asia. Blumea balsamifera is one of its species that is used in Southeast Asia. A weed, this plant is a ruderal species that often grows on disturbed land, and in grasslands. It has been described physically as:

Softly hairy, half woody, strongly aromatic shrub, 1-4 meters (m) high. Simple, alternate, broadly elongated leaves, 7-20 cm long, with toothed margin and appendaged or divided base. Loose yellow flower head scattered along much-branched leafy panicles. Two types of discoid flowers: peripheral ones tiny, more numerous, with tubular corolla; central flowers few, large with campanulate corolla. Anther cells tailed at base. Fruit (achene) dry, 1-seeded, 10-ribbed, hairy at top.

— Sambong listing at Stuart X Change list of Medicinal plants

== Use in the Philippines ==
In most of the Philippines, B. balsamifera is called sambong in the Tagalog language, but in Visayas it is known as bukadkad or gabon, and in Ilocos it is sometimes called subusob, subsub, or sobsob. Its primary uses are as a diuretic (or "water pill") and to treat symptoms of the common cold. As a diuretic, sambong is an herb used to treat urolithiasis (urinary tract or kidney stones) and urinary tract infections, and thus reduces high blood pressure. Sambong works as an expectorant, an antidiarrheal and an antispasmodic, all of which treat some symptoms of the common cold. It is also sometimes used as an astringent for wounds. It is approved by the Philippine Department of Health, Institute of Traditional and Alternative Health Care, and by the Bureau of Plant Industries of the Department of Agriculture.

No claim has been made by any responsible practitioner that it would cure the common cold or kidney disease, and it has "No Approved Therapeutic Claims". Rather the only legitimate claim is that it relieves symptoms.

The active ingredients exist in the volatile oil, made from the leaves of the sambong, which have mostly camphor and limonene, but also has traces of borneol, saponin, sesquiterpene, and tannin.

Sambong is available as a tea, and may be purchased commercially. The tea has a woody taste, with hint of menthol, described on an official Government of the Philippines website as "a strong camphoraceous odor and a pungent taste".

== Uses elsewhere in Asia ==
In Thai folklore, it is called Naat (หนาด) and is reputed to ward off spirits. It is also used in the treatment of infection.

In addition, it is used in traditional Chinese medicine, in Malay folk medicine, and in Indian Ayurvedic medicine.

Besides its medicinal uses, it may also be used as a decorative dry plant. The Bodos, of Assam, India, use it as a flavourful herb and add it to soups, chicken, curries, and also as a side dish with chillies and native soda ash water called khardwi.

== See also ==
- Bitter melon
- Chinese food therapy
- Mae Nak
