= Jasmine Nights =

1994 book by S. P. Somtow

- First edition
- Author: S.P. Somtow
- Language: English
- Publication date: 1994
- Publication place: United States
- Media type: Print (hardback & paperback)
- Pages: 379 pp
- ISBN: 0241002001

Jasmine Nights is a 1994 novel by the Thai author S.P. Somtow, first published by Hamish Hamilton in the United Kingdom in book form after first being serialized in weekly installments in the Bangkok Post. The U.S. edition, from St. Martin's Press, followed in 1995. It is a semi-autobiographical novel with touches of magic realism which relates a year in the life of a young Thai boy living with eccentric elderly relatives in a gilded estate hidden in an apparently ordinary soi in 1960s Bangkok.

== Plot summary ==
A twelve-year-old boy, known as Little Frog to his family and Justin to his few friends, is left in the care of three strange aristocratic aunts and a rather frightening uncle until he is old enough to attend Eton school in England. In order to prepare himself for his intended future, he insists on speaking only English and will eat only bacon and eggs for breakfast, though he is prepared to accept Thai dishes at other meals. In this peculiar situation the boy finds himself between three worlds, the Thai world of his family and his regal ancestors and their apparently pointless rituals, the western world of logic and common sense which he finds more compatible with his temperament and the imaginary world of his sheltered childhood.

Imagining himself to be a great scholar and philosopher, Justin enlists the aid of an African American boy and the family gardener's son and sets out to convert his school classmates from their ingrained bigotry and racism.

== Reviews ==
- "BOOK REVIEW / Little Frog hops about in a fake world: Jasmine Nights; S P Somtow; Hamish Hamilton, pounds 9.99 - Voices - The Independent". independent.co.uk. 4 September 1994.
- "Between Two Worlds: S.P. Somtow's Jasmine Nights | Tor.com". tor.com. 9 March 2009. Review by Jo Walton.
