= Ayodhya (opera) =

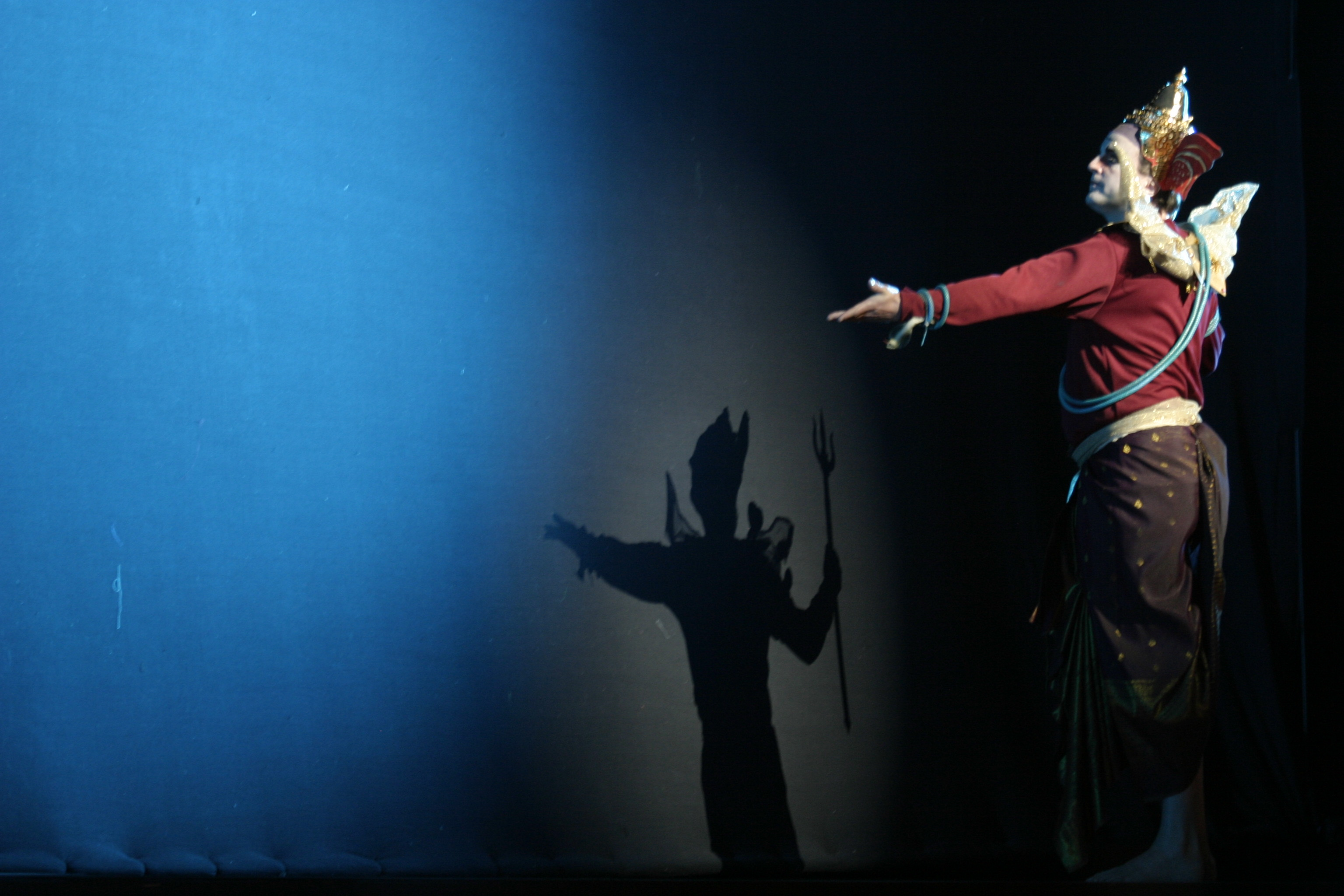
The Bangkok Opera's 2006 production of Ayodhya with Michael Chance as Ganesha.

Ayodhya is an opera by Somtow Sucharitkul. It premiered on November 16, 2006 at the Thailand Cultural Center in Bangkok, in a production directed by Dutch director Hans Nieuwenhuis and featuring Michael Chance as Ganesha, Nancy Yuen as Sita, Charles Hens as Rama, and John Ames as Ravan. The libretto is a distillation of the entire Ramayana epic into a single evening.

The opera was composed as a special tribute to the King of Thailand as part of the nationwide celebration of the King's Sixtieth Regnal Year. However, the opening was marred by a censorship debate which was widely discussed in the international press.
