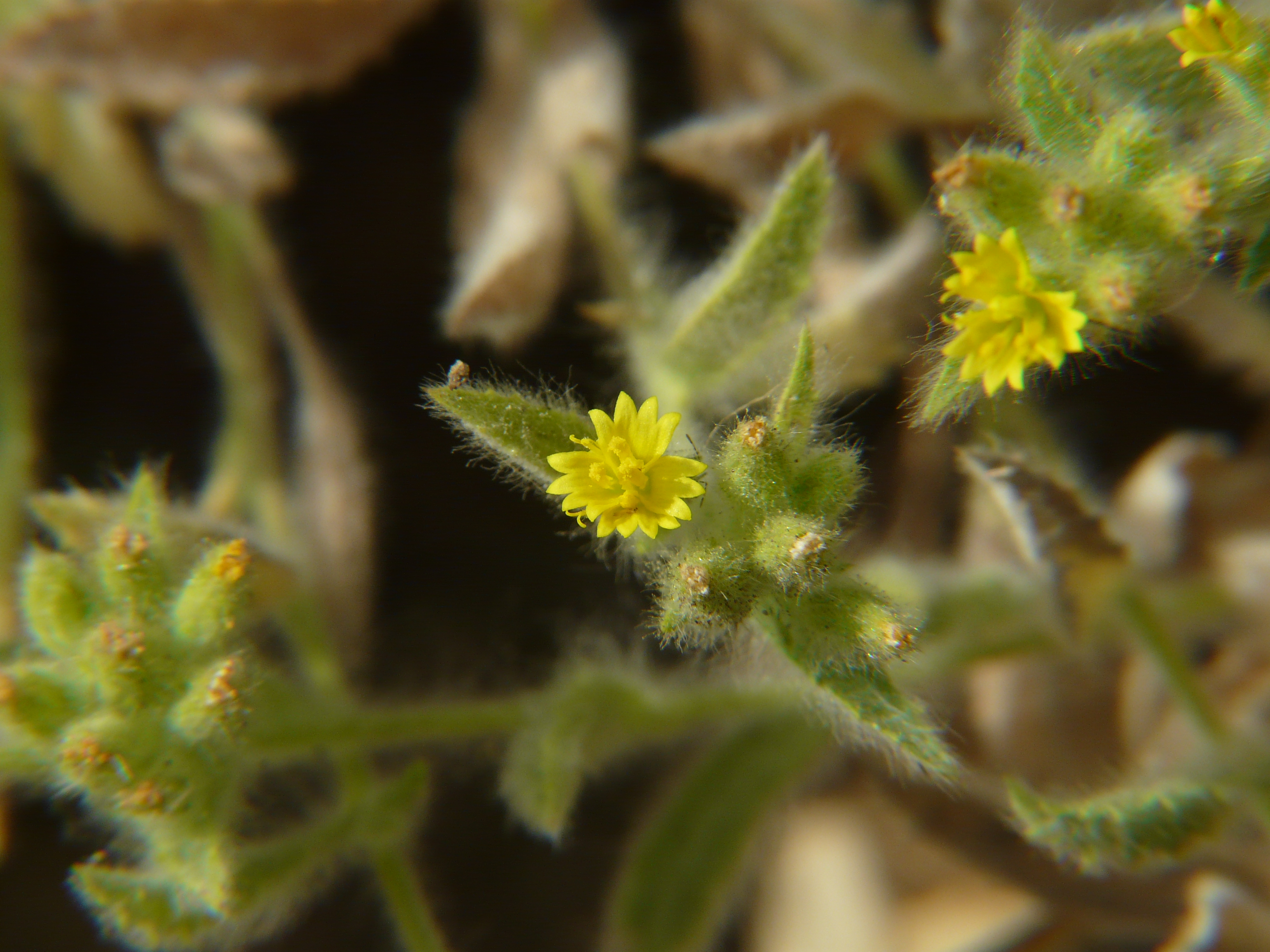

Scientific classification
- Kingdom: Plantae
- Clade: Tracheophytes
- Clade: Angiosperms
- Clade: Eudicots
- Clade: Asterids
- Order: Asterales
- Family: Asteraceae
- Genus: Blumea
- Species: B. sericea

Binomial name
- Blumea sericea (Thomson) Anderb. & A.K.Pandey

Synonyms
- Nanothamnus sericeus Thomson

= Blumea sericea =

Silky dwarf bush

Species of flowering plant

Blumea sericea, also known as silky dwarf bush, is a species of flowering plants in the fleabane tribe within the sunflower family. It has been placed as the sole species Nanothamnus sericeus in the monotypic genus Nanothamnus. It is native to India (Maharashtra and Karnataka).
