= Sinfonietta (orchestra) =

Measurement of musical group size

A sinfonietta is a musical group that is larger than a chamber ensemble but smaller than a full-size or symphony orchestra.

There are many orchestras called sinfonietta. Some groups are still a sinfonietta despite not including the word in their name:

- Alarm Will Sound
- American Modern Ensemble
- Amsterdam Sinfonietta
- American Sinfonietta
- Athelas Sinfonietta Copenhagen
- Basel Sinfonietta
- Berlin Sinfonietta
- Berks Sinfonietta
- Brussels Sinfonietta
- Dalasinfoniettan
- Toronto Sinfonietta
- BIT20 Ensemble
- Bournemouth Sinfonietta
- Chicago Sinfonietta
- Danish National Chamber Orchestra, also known as the Danish Radio Sinfonietta
- Fukushima Youth Sinfonietta
- Sinfonietta Köln
- Hong Kong Sinfonietta
- Hull Sinfonietta
- Imperial College Sinfonietta
- INSOMNIO
- Israel Sinfonietta Beer Sheva
- Kymi Sinfonietta
- Lake Placid Sinfonietta
- Sinfonietta de Lisboa
- Sinfonietta Paris
- Lancashire Sinfonietta
- London Sinfonietta
- Luton Sinfonietta
- Luxembourg Sinfonietta
- Sinfonietta Nova Arnstadt
- Kyiv Sinfonietta
- Orchestra Roma Sinfonietta
- Oslo Sinfonietta
- Praga Sinfonietta Orchestra
- Royal College of Music Sinfonietta
- San Francisco Sinfonietta
- Siam Sinfonietta
- Southampton Youth Sinfonietta Orchestra
- St Helens Sinfonietta
- Stockholm Sinfonietta
- Tapiola Sinfonietta
- Sinfonietta Rīga
- Sinfonietta de Ponta Delgada
- Sinfonietta Cracovia
- Sligo Academy of Music Sinfonietta
