= Siam Philharmonic Orchestra =

Thai musical ensemble (formed 2002)

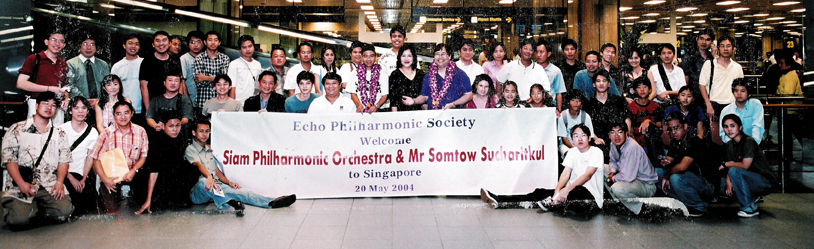
Siam Philharmonic Orchestra members during their 2004 Singapore tour

The Siam Philharmonic Orchestra was founded in 2002 in Bangkok, Thailand, under the name "Mifa Sinfonietta". At that time it was a small chamber ensemble devoted to bringing the discipline of the classical style to Thailand's classical musicians. It performed mostly the works of Mozart and Haydn. In 2003, the orchestra gained its autonomy from MIFA, the music academy where it was born, and was renamed the Bangkok Sinfonietta. However, later, in 2004, it became clear that the orchestra was no longer a sinfonietta since it was now performing large-scale orchestral works by Brahms and Mahler; to reflect this expansion in repertoire, it assumed the name Siam Philharmonic Orchestra.

The Siam Philharmonic Orchestra is the resident orchestra of Opera Siam, formerly under the royal patronage of Princess Galyani Vadhana. The current artistic director is S.P. Somtow, guest conductors have included Leo Phillips and Linda Cummings. The current resident conductor is Trisdee na Patalung. The orchestra regularly performs at the Thailand Cultural Centre.

The Siam Philharmonic Orchestra's recording of Richard Strauss's Four Last Songs, with soprano Nancy Yuen, appears under the Orchid label. It received second place in the independent JPF Awards in the opera category in 2006.

In 2009 it began an initiative to perform the complete Mahler symphonies.
