= Starship & Haiku =

1981 novel by Somtow Sucharitkul

First edition (publ. Pocket Books) Cover artist: Gerry Daly

Starship & Haiku is a novel by Somtow Sucharitkul published in 1981.

== Plot summary ==
Starship & Haiku is a novel in which the people of Japan seek to die honorably after the world is ravaged by biological as well as nuclear warfare.

== Reception ==
Greg Costikyan reviewed Starship and Haiku in Ares Magazine #12 and commented that "A rather depressing book enlightened by good writing, it is more serious in tone and intent than Sucharitkul's short stories. Worth reading mostly because Sucharitkul is likely to become a more interesting writer as time goes on."

The novel won the Locus Award for Best First Novel in 1982.

== Reviews ==
- Review by Jeff Frane (1981) in Locus, #248 September 1981
- Review by Robert A. Collins (1981) in Fantasy Newsletter, #42 November 1981
- Review by Baird Searles (1981) in Isaac Asimov's Science Fiction Magazine, November 23, 1981
- Review by Theodore Sturgeon (1982) in Rod Serling's The Twilight Zone Magazine, January 1982
- Review by Tom Easton (1982) in Analog Science Fiction/Science Fact, May 1982
