= Phra Khanong area =

Neighborhood in Bangkok, Thailand

Coordinates: 13°42′51″N 100°35′33″E

Location in Bangkok

Phra Khanong (Thai: พระโขนง) is a neighbourhood in Bangkok, divided between Phra Khanong Subdistrict in Khlong Toei District and Phra Khanong Nuea Subdistrict in Watthana District. It historically grew up around Khlong Phra Khanong (Phra Khanong Canal), and is nowadays centred around Phra Khanong Junction, the three-way road junction where Rama IV Road (heading west) meets Sukhumvit Road (travelling in a northwest-southeast direction), and the nearby Sukhumvit 71 or Pridi Banomyong Road.

Khlong Phra Khanong was excavated from 1837 to 1840, and rural communities soon settled along its banks. The historical settlement is believed to be the source of the ghost legend of Mae Nak Phra Khanong. Sukhumvit Road was built during the mid-twentieth century, linking Bangkok to the eastern seaboard and bringing development along with it. The new Phra Khanong neighbourhood grew up around Sukhumvit, and became a suburban commercial centre during the late 1970s to early 1980s. It was home to six cinemas, as well as several department stores. Phra Khanong Theatre, one of those cinemas, had a capacity of 3,000 seats and was considered the largest cinema in Asia. The neighbourhood soon fell into decline, but begin seeing revival as the BTS Skytrain, opened in 1999, brought new development. The neighbourhood is served by the Phra Khanong station, and is now home to several residential condominium towers, but remains much more low-key than nearby Ekkamai and Thong Lo, located inbound along Sukhumvit Road. Phra Khanong Junction has been ranked as the road junction with the worst congestion in the city.

Area map, with marker showing location of Phra Khanong Junction
