= Nancy Yuen (singer) =

Singaporean singer (born 1967)

Nancy Yuen Miu Fun (阮妙芬; born 1967) is a Singaporean singer.

== Career ==
Yuen was born in Hong Kong. She is a graduate of the Royal Academy of Music, London. and has based her career in the United Kingdom and Singapore. She has made Cio-cio-san (Madama Butterfly) her role, winning acclaim. Immediately upon graduation, she made her operatic debut with the Welsh National Opera in this demanding Puccini title role, and has since repeated the role all over the world, notably with the English National Opera, West Australian Opera, Opera Queensland, Northern Ireland Opera, Singapore Lyric Opera, the 1994 New Zealand International Festival of Arts, the 1995 Barbados Opera Festival and the Royal Albert Hall productions by David Freeman in 1998, 2000 and 2003.

Yuen's other operatic roles include Romilda (Xerxes), Violetta (La Traviata), Aida, Gilda (Rigoletto), Titania (A Midsummer Night's Dream), Rosalinda (Die Fledermaus), Nedda (Pagliacci), Siok Imm (Bunga Mawar), Leonora (Il trovatore), the title role of Tosca, Liza (The Queen of Spades), Mimi (La bohème), Jenny (Mahagonny-Songspiel), Micaela (Carmen), Pamina (The Magic Flute) with Opera Queensland, Donna Anna (Don Giovanni) and Liu (Turandot).

In September 2018, Yuen was appointed a professor at the Hong Kong Academy for Performing Arts.

Yuen made her role debut as the Countess in Mozart's Le Nozze di Figaro in 2006 with the Singapore Lyric Opera, and gave recitals and concerts in Singapore, Malaysia, Thailand, Taiwan, China and the UK. She was the Head of Vocal Studies at the Nanyang Academy of Fine Arts in Singapore from July 2003 to 2010. She is currently the Head of Vocal Studies at the Hong Kong Academy for Performing Arts and the residing soprano of Thailand's Bangkok Opera.

=== Performances ===
Yuen has a repertoire ranging from Baroque to contemporary. She performs regularly at the main UK venues and in Europe, the United States, the Middle East and Asia. Orchestras she has sung with include the London Mozart Players, the BBC Concert Orchestra, the Singapore Symphony Orchestra, the Hong Kong Philharmonic Orchestra, Tivoli Symphony Orchestra in Copenhagen, Denmark, and the West Australian Symphony Orchestra (under Christopher Hogwood). She has also recorded for the BBC, Radio Television Hong Kong and Radio FM, New Zealand. She has performed the soprano solos in Messiah, The Creation, The Seasons, the Nelson Mass, the Christmas Oratorio, Carmina Burana, Elijah, Monteverdi's Vespers, Mozart's Requiem and Great Mass in C minor, Poulenc's Gloria, Beethoven's Ninth Symphony, the Brahms, Fauré and Verdi Requiems, Mahler's Fourth Symphony and Janáček's Glagolitic Mass.

In 2004 Yuen released her first solo CD, Per l'amore, with the Siam Philharmonic Orchestra under the baton of Somtow Sucharitkul. In 2005 she repeated her performance as Cio-cio-san at the Singapore Esplanade Theatre with the Singapore Lyric Opera; she made her debut with the Singapore Chinese Orchestra, singing the role of Princess Han Li Bao in the world premiere of the operatic cantata Zheng He, written specially for her by Law Wai Lun, as part of the Singapore Arts Festival. She also repeated the title role of Mae Naak with the Bangkok Opera, a coloratura role created for her by Somtow Sucharitkul in 2003. She made her debut with the Macau Symphony Orchestra singing the soprano solo in Mendelssohn's Midsummer Night's Dream.

== Personal life ==
Yuen married Singaporean lawyer Toh Weng Cheong in 2000.
