= Khlong Phra Khanong =

Canal in Bangkok, Thailand

Coordinates: 13.709574°N 100.595580°E

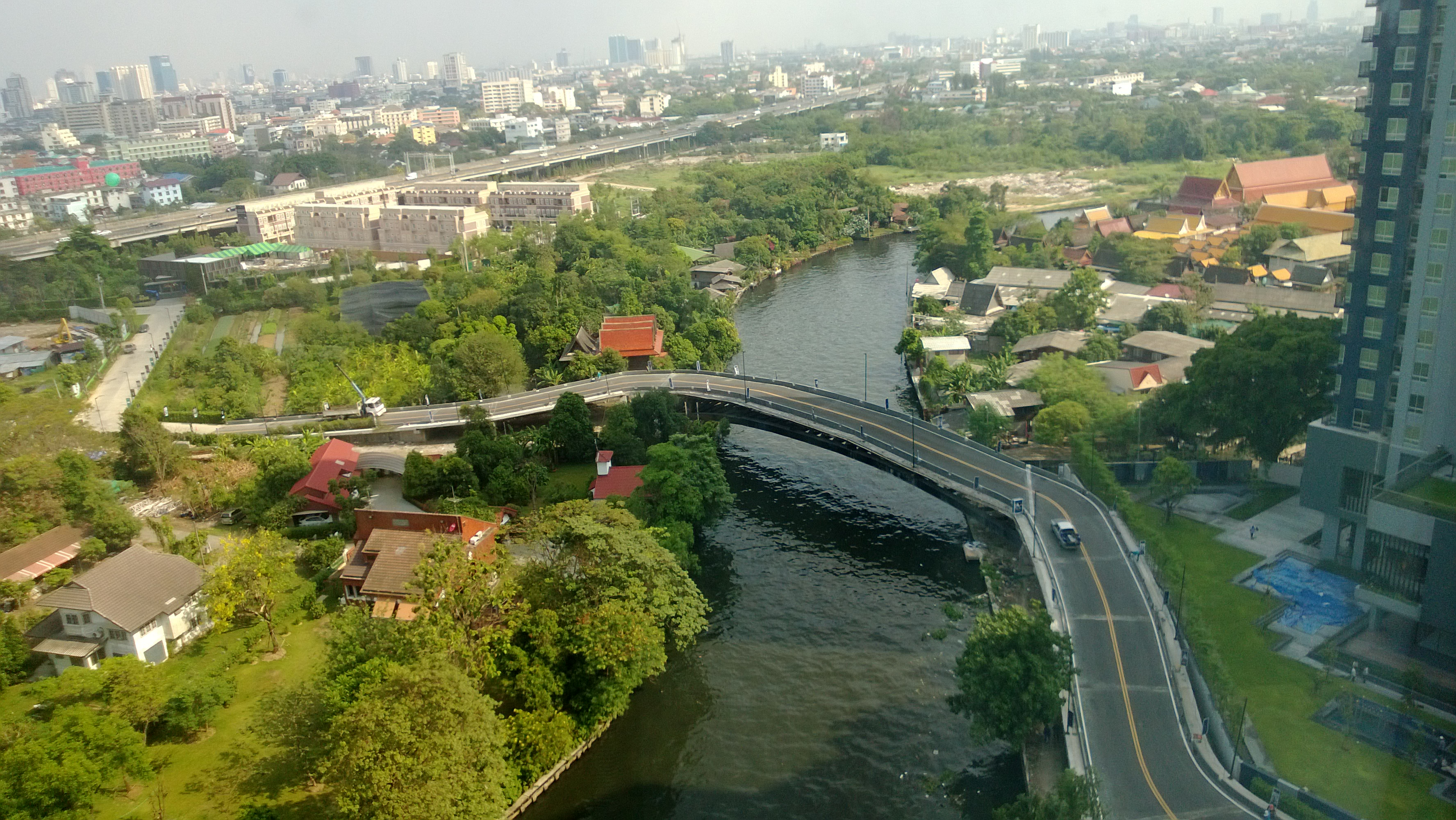
Khlong Phra Khanong in 2013, in Phra Khanong Nuea, Watthana District, Bangkok. The bridge seen here is now known as Saphan Suksamran ("joyfully bridge"), a local landmark and a popular spot for photography and check-ins.

Khlong Phra Khanong (Thai: คลองพระโขนง, RTGS: Khlong Phra Khanong, pronounced [kʰlɔ̄ːŋ pʰrá kʰa.nǒŋ]) is one of the important khlongs (canal) in eastern Bangkok. The canal flows through three districts, including Khlong Toei, Watthana, and Suan Luang. Its mouth is located near the Bangkok Port, commonly known as Khlong Toei Port, where it branches off from the eastern bank of the Chao Phraya River. The canal continues inland and eventually connects with Khlong Prawet Burirom at Hua Takhe, in Lat Krabang District, in the eastern suburban area of Bangkok. The total length of the canal is approximately 14.5 km (9.0 mi).

== Background ==
The origin of the name "Phra Khanong" is not definitively known. The word "khanong" is believed to derive from Khmer, meaning "eyebrow" or "the hair between the eyebrows". Alternatively, it may be a variation of the term "khanon," which referred to a customs checkpoint historically established along waterways. Khlong Phra Khanong is a natural canal that has appeared in historical records since ancient times. However, research by Thai historians suggests that the word "khanong" in Khmer can also literally mean "curved" or "bent," possibly referring to the winding nature of the canal. The area around its mouth was originally the site of Phra Pradaeng (now a district in Samut Prakan Province), which was historically inhabited by the Mon people since the Ayutthaya period. As a result, the canal has long been of significant importance, serving as a key route for transportation and trade since ancient times. Consequently, the areas surrounding the canal came to be collectively known as Phra Khanong, indicating that in the past, the Phra Khanong area covered a much larger extent than it does today.

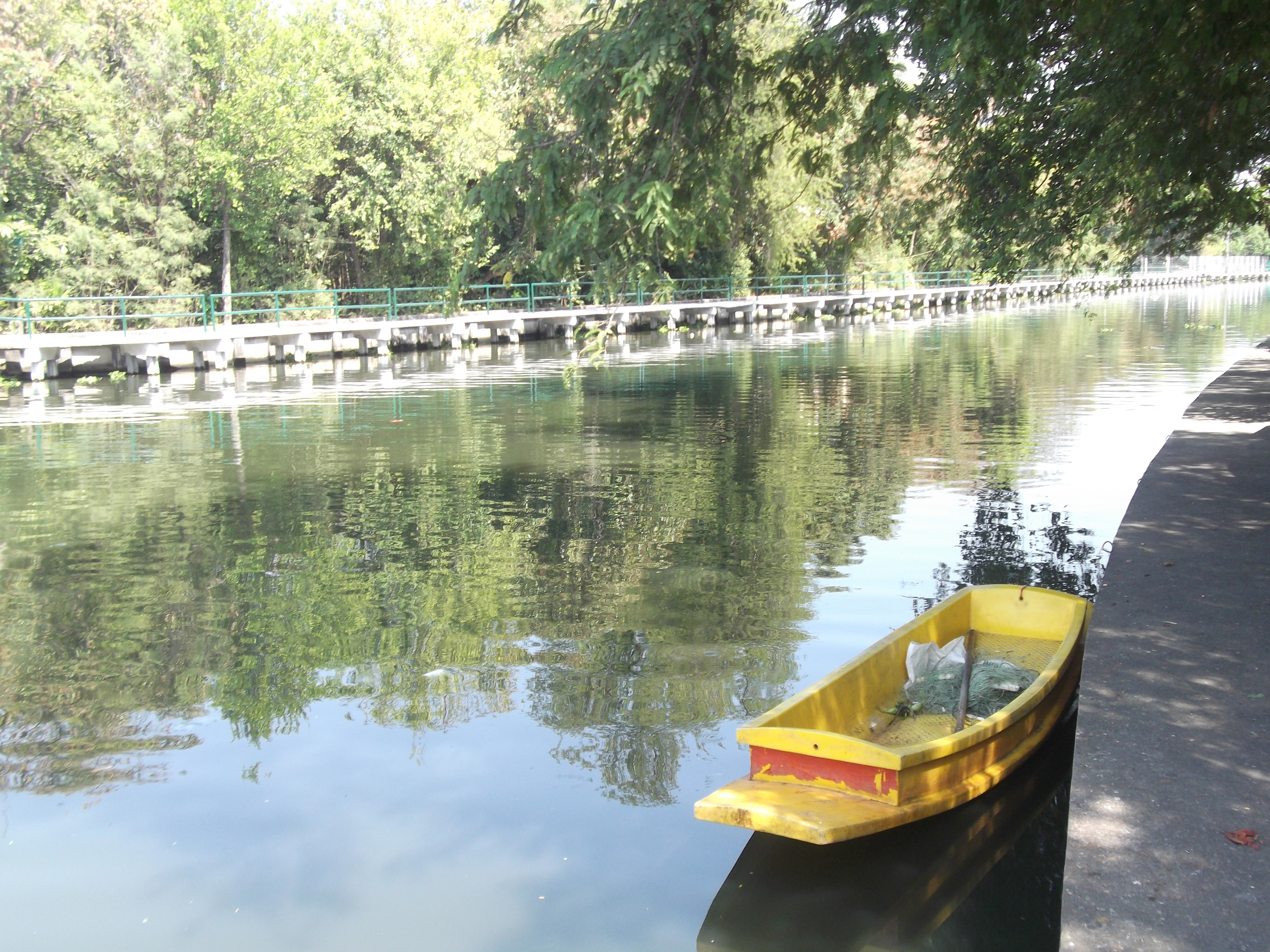
Khlong Phra Khanong as it flows past Wat Mahabut, the location of Mae Nak Phra Khanong shrine.

Khlong Phra Khanong was canalized and widened between 1837 and 1840 during the reign of King Rama III, in the early Rattanakosin period. As a result, more people began to settle along its banks. Later, during the reign of King Rama IV, a road was constructed starting from the area of what is now Hua Lamphong railway station, extending along the length of the canal toward Bang Na to facilitate transportation and trade. This road was originally known as "Thanon Trong" (ถนนตรง, lit. 'straight road') and was later officially named Rama IV Road by King Rama VI.

During the reign of King Rama V, the Canal Excavation Act of 1877 was promulgated. Under royal initiative, Khlong Phra Khanong was extended to connect with Khlong Dan, eventually reaching the Bang Pakong River in Chachoengsao Province. The newly excavated extension was named Khlong Prawet Burirom.'

According to urban legend, the banks of Khlong Phra Khanong were once the site of the home of Mae Nak Phra Khanong, a female ghost said to have died while pregnant. She is widely regarded as one of the most famous and enduring figures in Thai folklore, and is often believed to be based on a real event said to have occurred during the reign of King Rama III or King Rama IV. Given that the Phra Khanong area was much more extensive in the past, some have suggested that the story may not have taken place in what is now Phra Khanong or Suan Luang Districts, but possibly nearer the canal's origin, in the area of present-day Khlong Toei. Today, a shrine dedicated to her spirit is located at Wat Mahabut, along Khlong Phra Khanong, within Soi Sukhumvit 77, also known as Soi On Nut in Suan Luang District.

A former resident of the area near the canal mouth in Khlong Toei recalled that in the 1960s, during low tide, which occurred twice daily, the banks of the canal still retained characteristics of a mangrove environment. The ground was muddy, and mudskippers could be seen along both sides of the canal. This suggests that the area was likely influenced by seawater flowing into the Chao Phraya River.

At present, Khlong Phra Khanong is still used for transportation by both private boats and public commuter boats, which operate during the daytime only. The route connects the Phra Khanong area along Sukhumvit Road to Iam Sombat Market along Srinakarin Road.
