= Kyu Won Han =

American baritone (born 1972)

- Born: 1972 (age 53–54); Seoul, South Korea
- Education: Manhattan School of Music

Korean name
- Hangul: 한규원
- RR: Han Gyuwon
- MR: Han Kyuwŏn

Kyu-Won Han is an American baritone who has had an active international opera career for the last two decades.

== Early life and education ==
Kyu-Won Han was born in Seoul, South Korea in 1972. He gets his Bachelor and Master of Music degrees from the Manhattan School of Music.

== Career ==
Han made his debut in 1999 as Masetto in Don Giovanni at the San Francisco Opera. An alumnus of its prestigious Adler Fellowship Program and the Merola Opera Program, he also featured in Turandot, Carmen and Madame Butterfly among others. In 2001 Han made his European debut as Ping in the Opera National du Rhin production of "Turandot"; he appeared as Papageno in Die Zauberflöte with the New National Theater of Tokyo. His recent performances include the role of Figaro in the Opera National de Bordeaux production of Barber of Seville and double roles as Yamadori and Sharpless in "Madame Butterfly" at the Hyogo Performing Arts Center. Han is also active on the concert stage, and his credits include Beethoven's Ninth Symphony, Handel's Messiah, and Mahler's Eighth Symphony, Mendelssohn's "Elijah", "Carmina Burana" among numerous others. He is the recipient of many awards that include the Belvedere Competition, the Oratorio Society Competition, the Licia Albanese/ Puccini Competition, and the Di Capo Opera Competition to name a few. Han also released his debut CD, "Questo Amor", from Avex Classics. He also sings "Nim Ui No Rae", main theme from the Korean TV Drama King Sejong the Great.

== Operatic roles ==
- Morales in Carmen
- Frank in Die Fledermaus
- Don Giovanni, Masetto in Don Giovanni
- Prince Yamadori, Sharpless in Madame Butterfly
- Maak in Mae Naak
- King of Kashii in The Silent Prince
- Scarpia in Tosca
- Ping in Turandot
- Papageno in Die Zauberflöte

== Concerts ==
- Beethoven's Ninth Symphony
- Beethoven's Missa Solemnis
- Brahms's Requiem
- Faure's Requiem
- Handel's Messiah
- Mahler's Eighth Symphony
- Mozart's Coronation Mass
- Schubert's Mass No.2
- Berstein's Chichester Psalms
- Saint-Saëns's Oratorio de Noel
- Mendelssohn's Elijah
- Orff's Carmina Burana
