= Opera Siam =

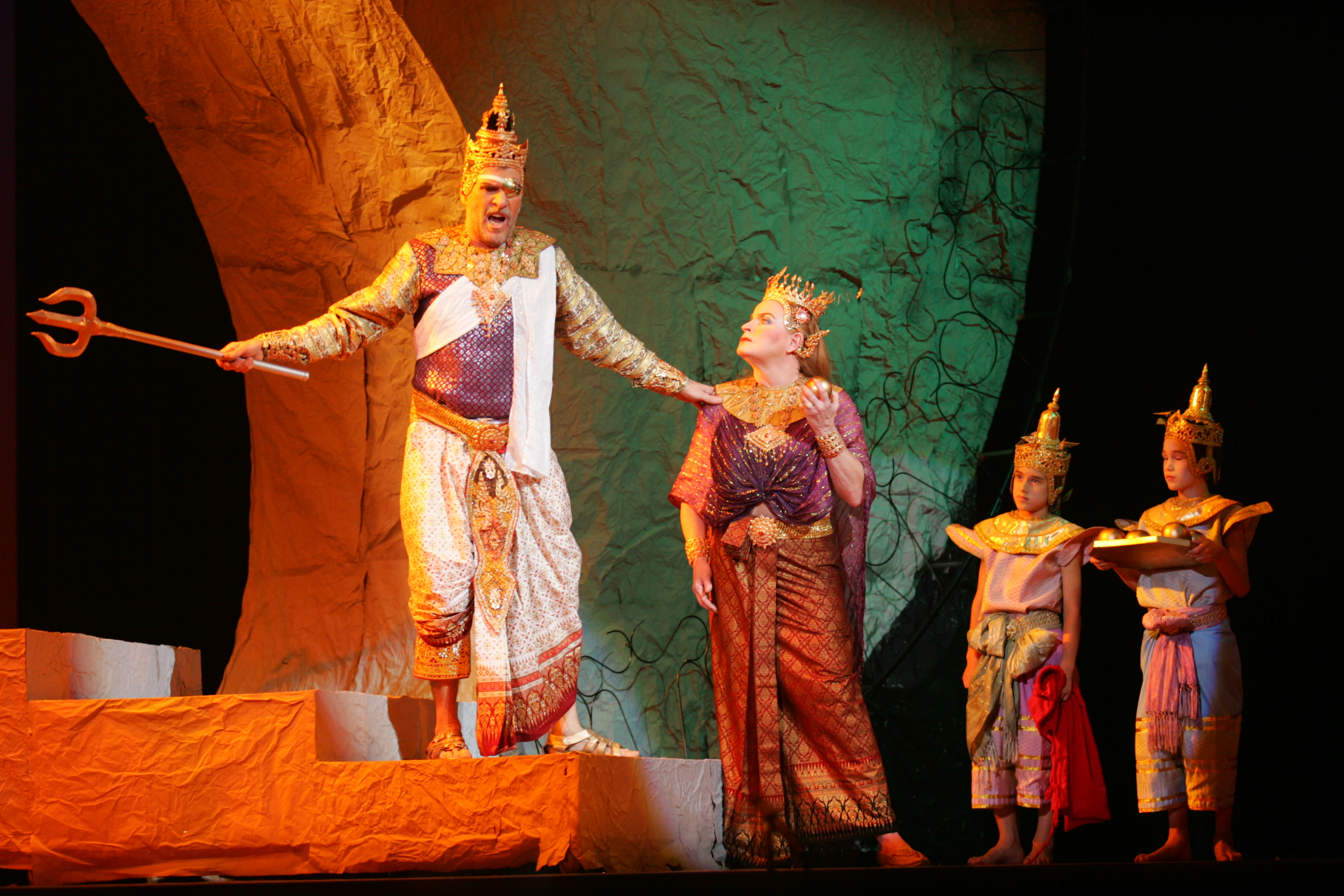
Bangkok Opera's 2006 production of Das Rheingold with features drawn from Southeast Asian myth

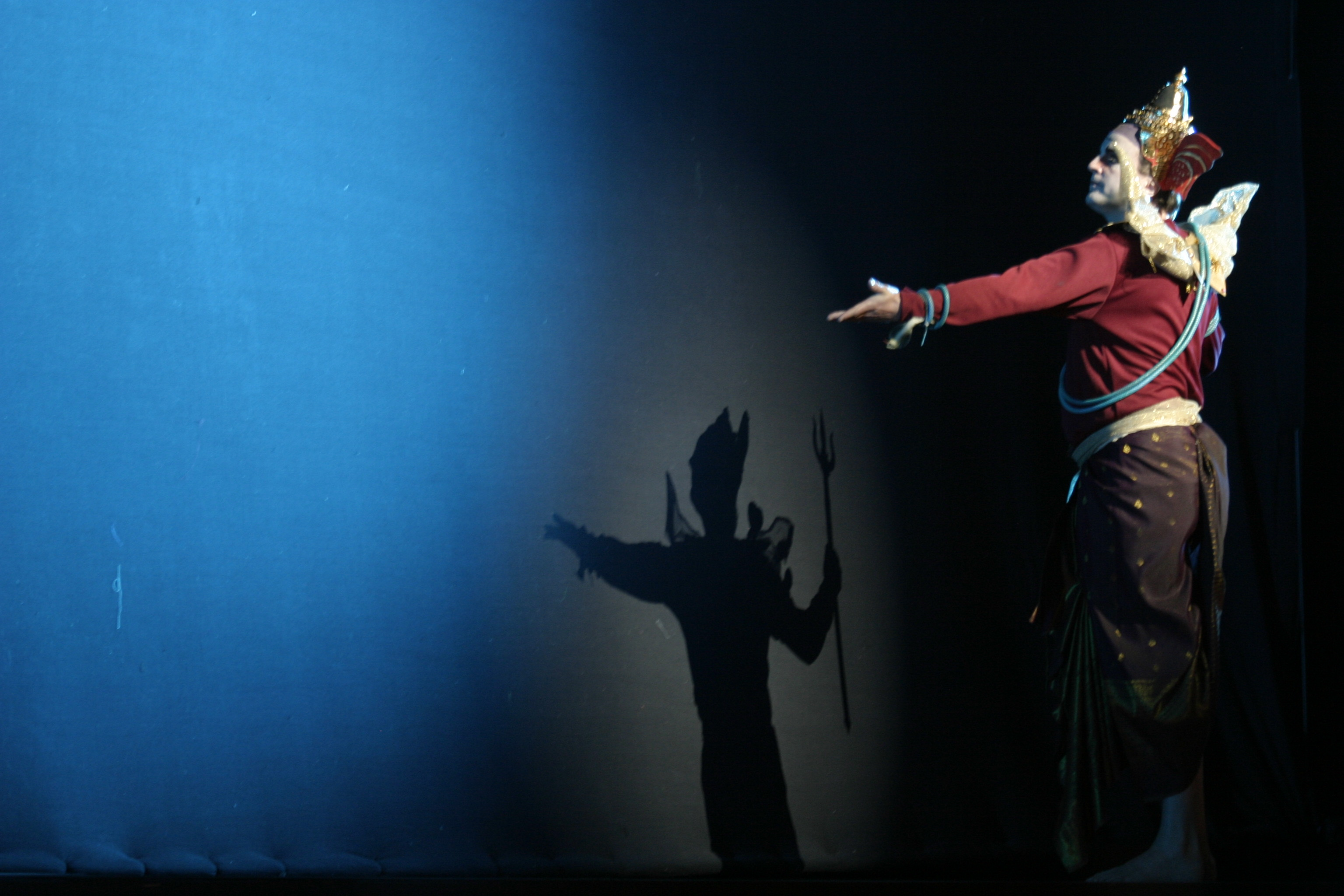
Bangkok Opera's 2006 production of Ayodhya with Michael Chance as Ganesha

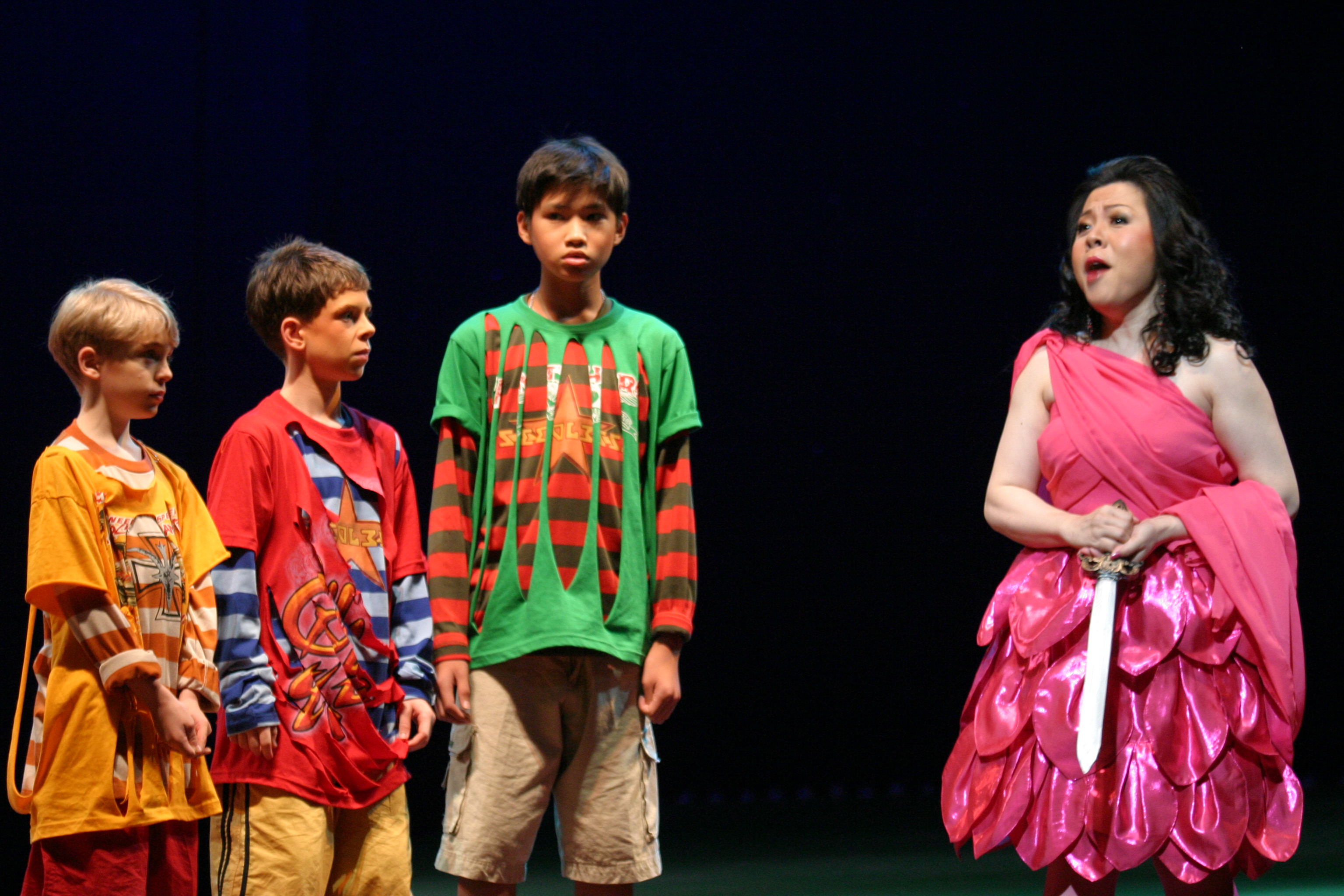
Bangkok Opera's 2006 production of The Magic Flute with Nancy Yuen as Pamina and Will Rhodes, Dominick Gilbert and Soponwit Wangcharoensab as boys

Opera Siam, formerly Bangkok Opera, is an opera company in Bangkok, Thailand. It presents an international opera repertoire, together with home-grown favorites.

The company was founded in 2001, as a production company to mount Madana, the first full-length grand opera by Thai composer S. P. Somtow under the royal patronage of Princess Galyani Vadhana. This production featured in the title role the American soprano Stacey Tappan.

In 2002, with Somtow as artistic director, the Bangkok Opera began a series of productions, the first being Purcell's Dido and Aeneas. The series then moved onto larger-scale works such as Mae Naak, The Magic Flute, and Turandot.

At the end of 2005 the Bangkok Opera declared its first "complete" season and also started a five-year project to perform the complete Wagner's Ring Cycle. Its resident orchestra is the Siam Philharmonic Orchestra and its resident chorus is the Orpheus Choir of Bangkok. The company performs regularly at the Thailand Cultural Centre, and at other venues in Bangkok.

Overture to The Magic Flute
Composed by Mozart, recorded from Bangkok Opera's 2006 production, conducted by Trisdee na Patalung, featuring the Siam Philharmonic Orchestra, duration is 6:36

Somtow says the Bangkok Opera was set up based on the idea that, "nothing important has ever happened in art when an audience has been ready for it." He says the opera caters to three groups: expatriates, high society, and other Thais who love opera. He seeks to bring all three groups under one roof.

In 2013 Opera Siam International premiered S. P. Somtow's ballet-opera Suriyothai in honour of the birthday of Queen Sirikit. It starred Stacey Tappan and Winita Lohitkul, and was conducted by Trisdee na Patalung.

== See also ==
- Music of Thailand
