= Phra Khanong BTS station =

Phra Khanong พระโขนง
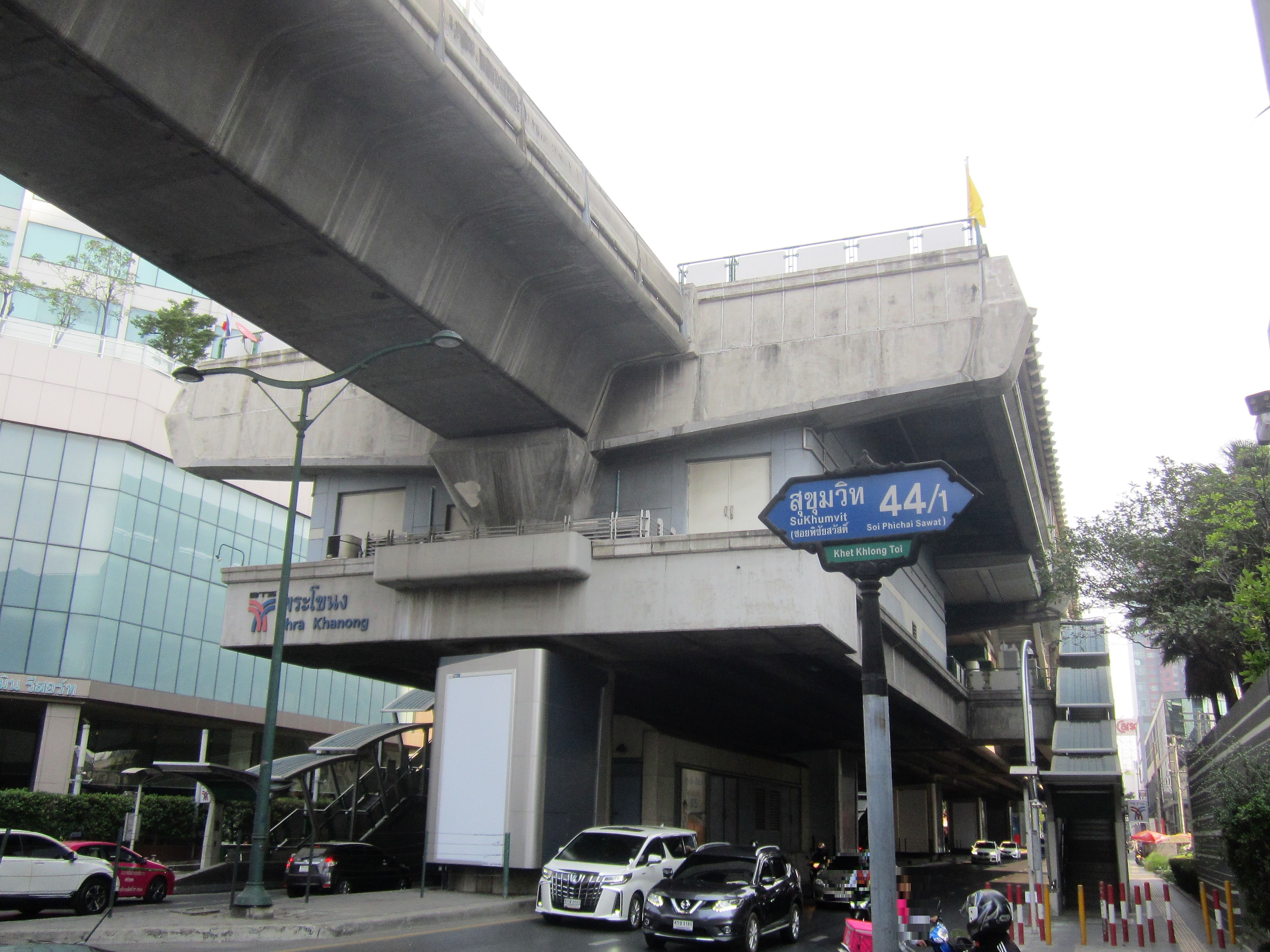
- Phra Khanong station seen from Khlong Toei area in early 2021

General information
- Location: Watthana and Phra Khanong, Khlong Toei; Bangkok; Thailand
- Coordinates: 13°42′54.70″N 100°35′28.62″E
- System: BTS
- Owner: Bangkok Metropolitan Administration (BMA); BTS Rail Mass Transit Growth Infrastructure Fund (BTSGIF)
- Operator: Bangkok Mass Transit System; Public Company Limited (BTSC)
- Line: Sukhumvit Line

Other information
- Station code: E8

History
- Opened: 5 December 1999

Passengers
- 2021: 1,804,128

Services
Preceding station	BTS Skytrain	Following station
Ekkamai towards Khu Khot	Sukhumvit Line	On Nut towards Kheha
Location

Phra Khanong Station Traditional sign

Phra Khanong station (Thai: สถานีพระโขนง, pronounced [sā.tʰǎː.nīː pʰráʔ kʰā.nǒːŋ]) is a BTS skytrain station on the Sukhumvit line between Khlong Toei and Watthana Districts, Bangkok, Thailand. The station is located on Sukhumvit Road to the west of Phra Khanong and Sukhumvit 71 Road junction near Phra Khanong market.

== See also ==
- Bangkok Skytrain
- Phra Khanong District
