= S. P. Somtow =

Thai-American musical composer and author of science fiction and horror (born 1952)

Somtow Sucharitkul ChBh(OT)
- Born: December 30, 1952 (age 73); Bangkok, Thailand
- Education: Eton College
- Alma mater: St Catharine's College, Cambridge
- Writing career
- Pen name: S. P. Somtow
- Website: www.somtow.com

Somtow Papinian Sucharitkul (Thai: สมเถา สุจริตกุล; RTGS: Somthao Sucharitkun; December 30, 1952), known professionally as S. P. Somtow, is a Thai-American author, composer, and conductor. He has written science fiction, fantasy, and horror in English under the names Somtow Sucharitkul and S. P. Somtow, and has composed and conducted extensively in Thailand, where he founded several of the country's leading classical-music institutions. He holds both Thai and American citizenship.

Somtow won the John W. Campbell Award for Best New Writer in 1981 and the World Fantasy Award for Best Novella in 2002. As a musician he is the founder and artistic director of Opera Siam and has led Thai premieres of works by Wagner, Mahler, and others. He served as a musical consultant on the 2022 film Tár.

== Early life and education ==
Somtow was born in Bangkok in 1952. He belongs to the Sucharitkul family, a ratchinikun — a lineage connected to the ruling Chakri dynasty through royal consorts rather than the male royal line. Two of his grandfather's sisters were consorts of King Vajiravudh (Rama VI): Prueang, known as Phra Sucharit Suda, and Praphai, who reigned briefly as Queen Indrasakdi Sachi before being styled Princess Consort. The family descends from Piam Sucharitkul, a consort of King Mongkut (Rama IV) and the maternal grandmother of Rama VI. The family moved to England when Somtow was six months old, and English became his first language.

Somtow was educated at Eton College and at St Catharine's College, Cambridge. He returned to Thailand for a period in the early 1960s, during which he became fluent in Thai. At the age of eleven he wrote a poem, "Kith of Infinity," which was published in the English-language Bangkok Post. According to accounts of his early life, the actress Shirley MacLaine encountered the poem and — reportedly believing it the work of a deceased poet — included it in her 1970 memoir Don't Fall Off the Mountain; the poem's line "I am not a man" is said to have contributed to the misattribution.

== Literary career ==
Somtow was first published in the late 1970s under his birth name, Somtow Sucharitkul, with short fiction appearing in the magazines Isaac Asimov's Science Fiction Magazine and Analog Science Fiction and Fact. He later adopted the pen name S. P. Somtow.

=== Science fiction ===
His early science fiction includes the Mallworld, Inquestor, and Aquiliad series, as well as The Riverrun Trilogy. He won the John W. Campbell Award for Best New Writer in 1981 for Sunsteps, and the Locus Award for Best First Novel in 1982 for Starship & Haiku.

=== Horror ===
Under the S. P. Somtow byline he wrote Vampire Junction and a related series of novels and stories. His horror works also include Moon Dance, a werewolf novel in a Western setting; Darker Angels, set during the American Civil War; the young-adult novel The Vampire's Beautiful Daughter (1997); and the collections Tagging the Moon: Fairy Tales of L.A. and The Pavilion of Frozen Women. He won the International Horror Guild Award for Long Fiction in 1996 for Brimstone and Salt and the World Fantasy Award for Best Novella in 2002 for The Bird Catcher. He served as president of the Horror Writers Association from 1998 to 2000.

Somtow also wrote and directed the cult horror film The Laughing Dead, in which he appeared alongside the writer Tim Sullivan, and co-wrote the Roger Corman–produced Bram Stoker's Burial of the Rats (1995).

=== Other fiction ===
Jasmine Nights (1994), a semi-autobiographical novel set in 1960s Thailand, is among his most widely reviewed works. His historical fantasy The Shattered Horse imagines that Hector's son Astyanax survives the fall of Troy and reaches adulthood.

For television, Somtow wrote episodes of the animated series Dinosaucers, COPS, and Chip 'n Dale: Rescue Rangers.

== Musical career ==
=== Composition ===
Somtow has composed five symphonies and a ballet, Kaki. His Requiem: In Memoriam 9/11, commissioned by the government of Thailand as a memorial for the victims of the September 11 attacks, draws on the poetry of Walt Whitman, Emily Dickinson, and T. S. Eliot.

In 2000 he composed Madana, described as the first Western-style orchestral opera by a Thai composer, based on a Thai-language play by King Vajiravudh (Rama VI) and sung in English. His later operas include Mae Naak (2003), Ayodhya (2006), and Dan no Ura (premiered in Bangkok in 2014). His stage works also include Reya the Musical (2012), based on a serialized novel by his mother, and the ballet-opera hybrid Suriyothai (2013). The Snow Dragon, an opera adapted from his fantasy story The Fallen Country, premiered at the Skylight Music Theatre in Milwaukee in 2015.

=== Das Jati ===
Das Jati (Ten Lives of the Buddha) is Somtow's most ambitious undertaking as a composer: a projected cycle of ten linked music-dramas based on the Thotsachat, the last ten Jataka tales recounting the Buddha's final incarnations before his enlightenment. Somtow writes, composes, and directs the cycle, which pairs different combinations of Thai and Western instruments for each work. The project describes itself as an Asian counterpart to Richard Wagner's Ring cycle at the Bayreuth Festival, and its promotional materials call it "the most ambitious single work of performing arts in history."

The first installment, the opera The Silent Prince (based on the Temiya Jataka), premiered in Houston in 2010, was staged in Thailand by Opera Siam in 2012, and later toured to Brno, Prague, and the Bayreuth region in 2016. Seven of the ten stories have since reached the stage in some form, all produced by Opera Siam under Somtow's direction: Mahajanaka (2014), reworked from his earlier Mahajanaka Symphony; Bhuridatta – The Dragon Lord (2015); Sama – The Faithful Son (2015, revived 2017); The Chariot of Heaven (staged 2017, after concert scenes in 2016); Architect of Dreams (2019); and Chandakumar (2019). Opera Siam presented a compilation, Scenes from DasJati, in 2024. The remaining three Jatakas of the cycle had not been staged as of 2025, leaving the full ten-part work incomplete.

=== Conducting and institutions ===
Somtow is the founder and artistic director of Opera Siam (formerly Bangkok Opera). In 2006 he conducted Das Rheingold, described as the first Wagner opera staged in Southeast Asia, as part of a planned production of the complete Ring cycle. He has led Thai premieres of operas including Thaïs, Otello, and The Rape of Lucretia, and undertook a cycle of Mahler's symphonies in Thailand, completing the Second Symphony in 2015.

In the 1970s Somtow formed the Temple of Dawn Consort with Dnu Huntrakul and Bruce Gaston, an ensemble devoted to a fusion of Thai and Western music. After his move to the United States in 1979, the group evolved into other ensembles, most notably Gaston's Fong Naam. On returning to Thailand, Somtow founded the Siam Philharmonic Orchestra, the youth orchestra Siam Sinfonietta, and the Orpheus Choir of Bangkok.

== Political views ==
When the Nobel laureate Wole Soyinka withdrew as keynote speaker at the 2006 SEA Write Awards in protest of the 2006 Thai coup that ousted Prime Minister Thaksin Shinawatra, Somtow — himself a critic of Thaksin — replaced him as speaker. Soon afterward, his opera Ayodhya was subject to state censorship under the military government, which objected to the on-stage death of the demon-king Thotsakan as a "bad omen"; Somtow agreed to modify the scene.

Somtow has since been critical of multiple sides in Thailand's political disputes. While opposed to Thaksin's populist government, he stated in 2019 that Thaksin's opponents "went beyond the pale when they started to say that the poor shouldn't vote because they're too stupid," and praised a speech by Democrat Prime Minister Abhisit Vejjajiva as "balanced" and "reasonable."

== Awards and honours ==
=== Literary awards ===
Year	Award	Category	Work	Result
1981	John W. Campbell Award	Best New Writer	Sunsteps	Won
1982	Locus Award	Best First Novel	Starship & Haiku	Won
1996	International Horror Guild Award	Long Fiction	Brimstone and Salt	Won
2002	World Fantasy Award	Best Novella	The Bird Catcher	Won

He has additionally received two Hugo Award nominations, five Bram Stoker Award nominations, and four further World Fantasy Award nominations, as well as the HOMer Award and the American Horror Award.

=== Other honours ===
- 2008 – Silpathorn Kittikhun Award, conferred by Thailand's Ministry of Culture for his combined literary and theatrical work
- 2011 – Named by The Nation as one of the "40 Most Internationally Acclaimed Thais"
- 2013 – Golden W Award, International Wagner Society, for ten years' service presenting the works of Richard Wagner in the region
- 2022 – Best Actor, Casablanca Film Factory Awards, for The Maestro: A Symphony of Terror
- 2025 – Appointed a Companion (Fourth Class) of the Most Admirable Order of the Direkgunabhorn, in recognition of his contributions to music and the arts in Thailand
