= Indonesia Mosque =

Mosque in Pathum Wan, Bangkok, Thailand

- มัสยิดอินโดนีเซีย
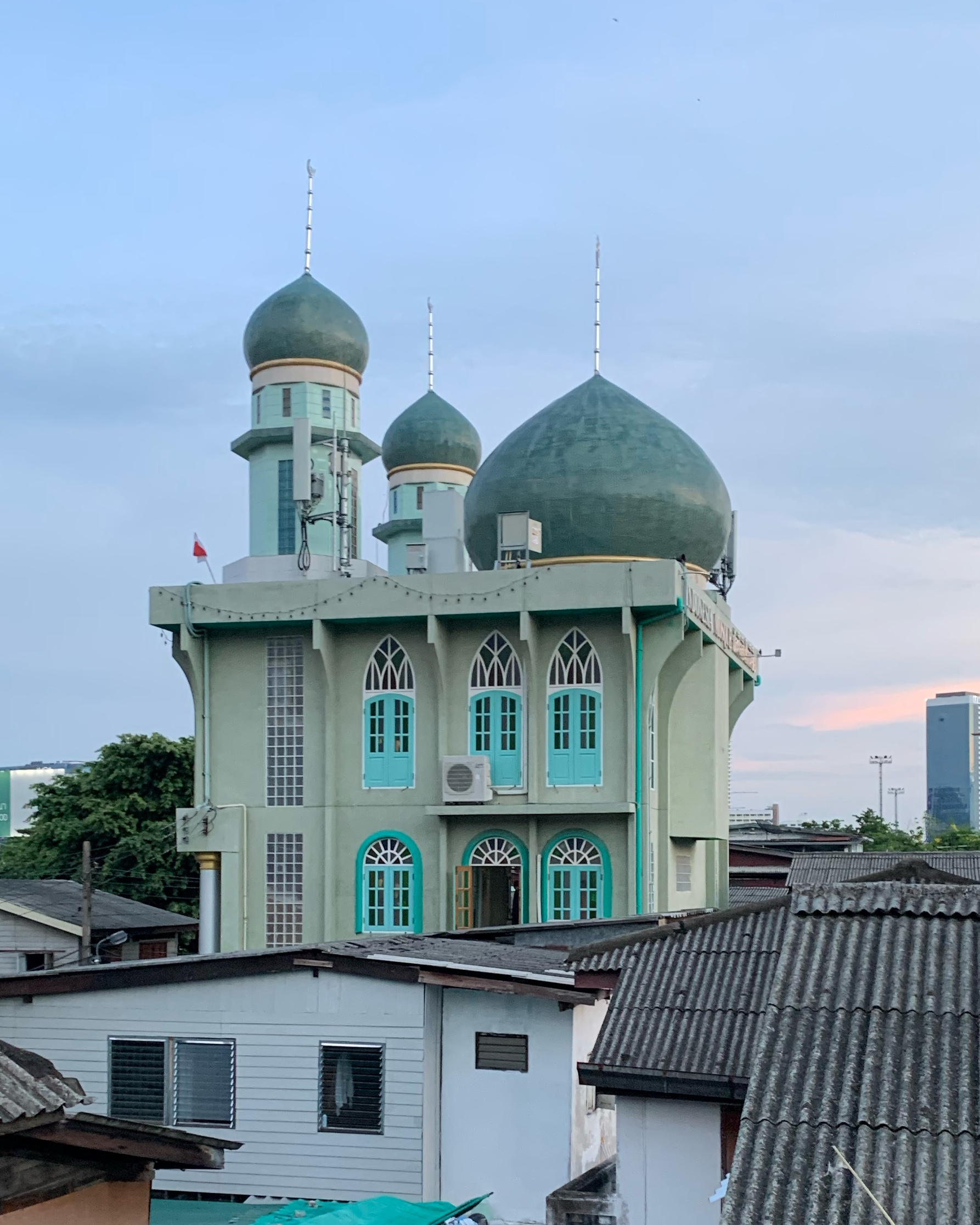

Religion
- Affiliation: Islam

Location
- Location: Lumphini subdistrict, Pathum Wan district, Bangkok
- Country: Thailand
- Interactive map of Indonesia Mosque
- Coordinates: 13°44′01″N 100°32′57″E

Architecture
- Type: mosque

Indonesia Mosque, or Masjid Indonesia (Thai: มัสยิดอินโดนีเซีย), is a mosque in Bangkok, Thailand. Located on Soi Polo, in Lumphini subdistrict, Pathum Wan district, the mosque is adjacent to the Green Mile that connects Lumphini and Benjakkiti parks.

== History ==
The mosque was built by Thai Muslims of Indonesian descent, and sits at the center of a historic Muslim community.
