= Green Bridge (Bangkok) =

Park in Bangkok, Thailand

Coordinates: 13.7339°N 100.5511°E

- Green Mile
- สะพานเขียว
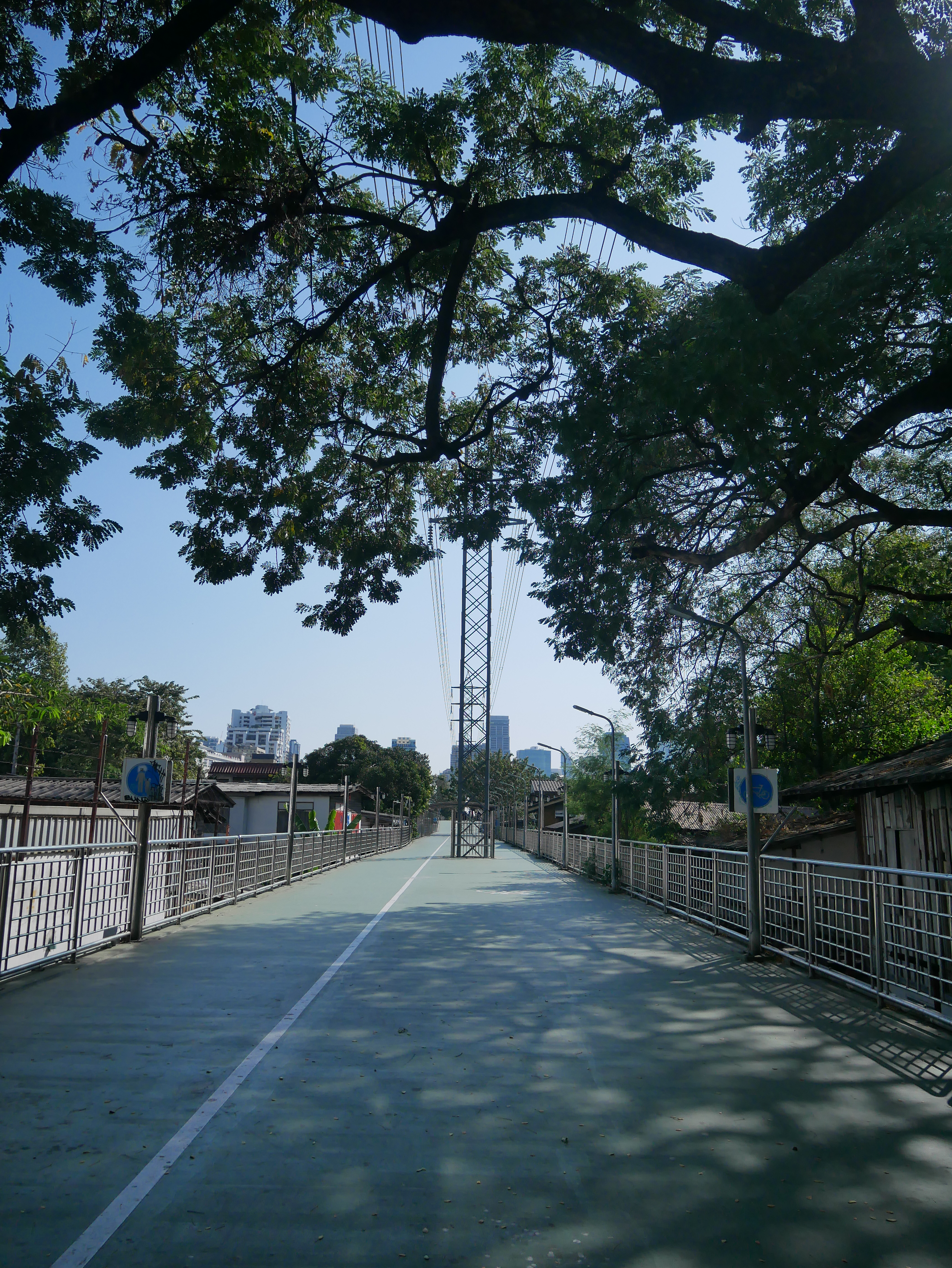
- Interactive map of Green Bridge
- Location: Connecting Benjakitti Park and Lumphini Park
- Opened: 1999
- Owner: Bangkok Metropolitan Administration

The Green Bridge (Thai: สะพานเขียว) is a 1.6 kilometres (1 mi) elevated linear park and greenway connecting Benjakitti and Lumpini Parks in Bangkok, Thailand.

== History ==
The walkway was constructed in 1999 to connect two major parks. It was subsequently renovated in 2022.

On 30 November 2025, the Green Bridge reopened following a major renovation by the Bangkok Metropolitan Administration. Renovations including replacing steep staircases with elevated ramps, paving walking paths with granite, and applying a sport surface on cycling lanes for slip resistance and high impact absorption.

The remainder of the renovations are expected to be completed by mid-2026.

== Route ==
From Lumpini Park, the Green Bridge passes above Witthayu (Wireless) Road, next to Soi Polo, Soi Ruamrudee, Mahathai Church, and Indonesia Mosque, and over the Chaloem Maha Nakhon Expressway into Benjakitti Park.
