= Benjakitti Park =

Park in Khlong Toei, Bangkok, Thailand

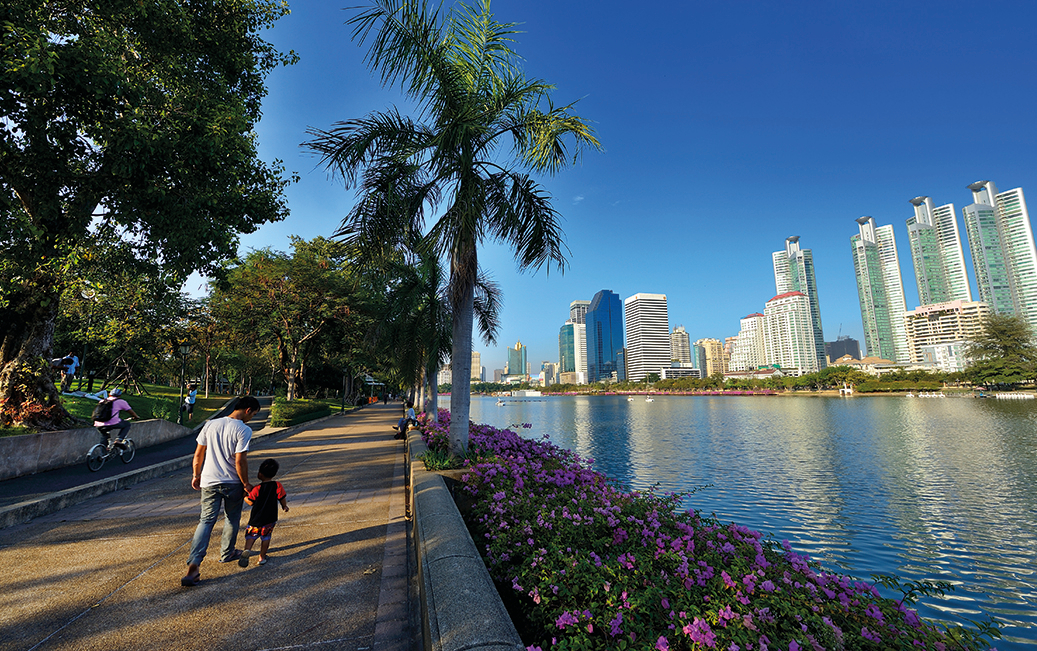
- Benjakitti Park, Bangkok
- Interactive map of Benjakitti Park
- Type: Urban Park
- Location: Ratchadapisek Road (between Rama IV Road and Sukhumvit Road), Khlong Toei, Bangkok, Thailand
- Coordinates: 13°43′45.84″N 100°33′30.96″E
- Area: 72 hectares (180 acres)
- Created: 9 December 2004
- Operator: Bangkok Metropolitan Administration
- Status: Open from 4.30 am to 10.00 pm
- Public transit: Asok station QSNCC station & Sukhumvit station BMTA Bus / Affiliated Bus; Taxi / Motorcycle taxi

Benjakitti Park (Thai: สวนเบญจกิติ, RTGS: Suan Benchakitti, pronounced [sǔa̯n bēn.t͡ɕàʔ.kìt.tìʔ]) is a 450 rai public park located in the Khlong Toei District of Bangkok, Thailand. Since its opening in 1992, Benjakitti Park has become a popular destination for outdoor recreation and exercise in Bangkok. The park offers playgrounds, dog park, water activities, and indoor sports facilities. Its wetland ares incorporate the sponge city concept to manage stormwater and support urban biodiversity, while its elevated walkways allow visitors to observe the plants and birds. These features make the park as a green space in the heart of Bangkok.

Benjakitti Park is open daily from 4:30 a.m. to 10:00 p.m., while cycling paths is open from 6:00 a.m. to 5:30 p.m.

The park provides free parking facilities for visitors, including 2 car parking areas with a capacity of 400 cars and a motorcycle parking area with a capacity of 200 motorcycles.

== Location ==
Benjakitti Park is located in the Khlong Toei District of central Bangkok, situated next to the Queen Sirikit National Convention Center.

== Transportation ==
It is close to Queen Sirikit National Convention Centre MRT station Exit 3, Sukhumvit MRT station Exit 3, and Asok BTS station Exit 4. The park is also served by several public bus routes, including lines 45, 46, 109, 115, 116, and 136.

== History ==
It was officially opened in 2004 (on land formally owned by the Tobacco Authority of Thailand) to honor the 72nd birthday of Queen Sirikit. Before that, it had been in operation since 1992, the year the queen turned 60 (5th cycle), hence the name "Bejakitti" (5 cycles). The name "Benjakitti" was given by Queen Sirikit during the opening. Benjakitti Park has a landmark symbol called “Pathumchart” near the pond. Benjakitti Park was developed from the Tobacco Pond area, 200x800 meters, built by digging and reclamation. This park was part of the project replacement area from resolutions in the government of Prime Minister Anand Panyarachun.

Between 1 and 9 December 2014, this park was used for performing theater and a spectacular technique to commemorate the King, "The Phra Mahachanok The Phenomenal Life Show," by the stage in the middle of the pond over 100 meters, which is the longest water stage in the country. It includes a central boating lake, an outdoor exercise area, a cycling track, and a path that is used by walkers and joggers; bicycles and boats can be hired in the park.

=== Expansion to Benjakitti Forest Park ===
Green Bridge Lumpini-Banjakiti

A major expansion of the park was approved in 2006, with land granted from the Tobacco Monopoly to build Benjakitti Forest Park to celebrate Queen Sirikit's birthday in 2006. The 652-million baht expansion makes Benjakitti Park the first park in Bangkok with a forest park and expands the size of the park to 72 hectares. Facilities include elevated walkways, wetlands, rare plant areas, cycle paths, and an outdoor amphitheater. The expansion fully opened in 2022.

The park is connected to Lumphini Park via the Green Bridge, a 1.3 km-long elevated pedestrian and bicycle trail located at its northwest corner.

== Design ==
=== Wetlands ===
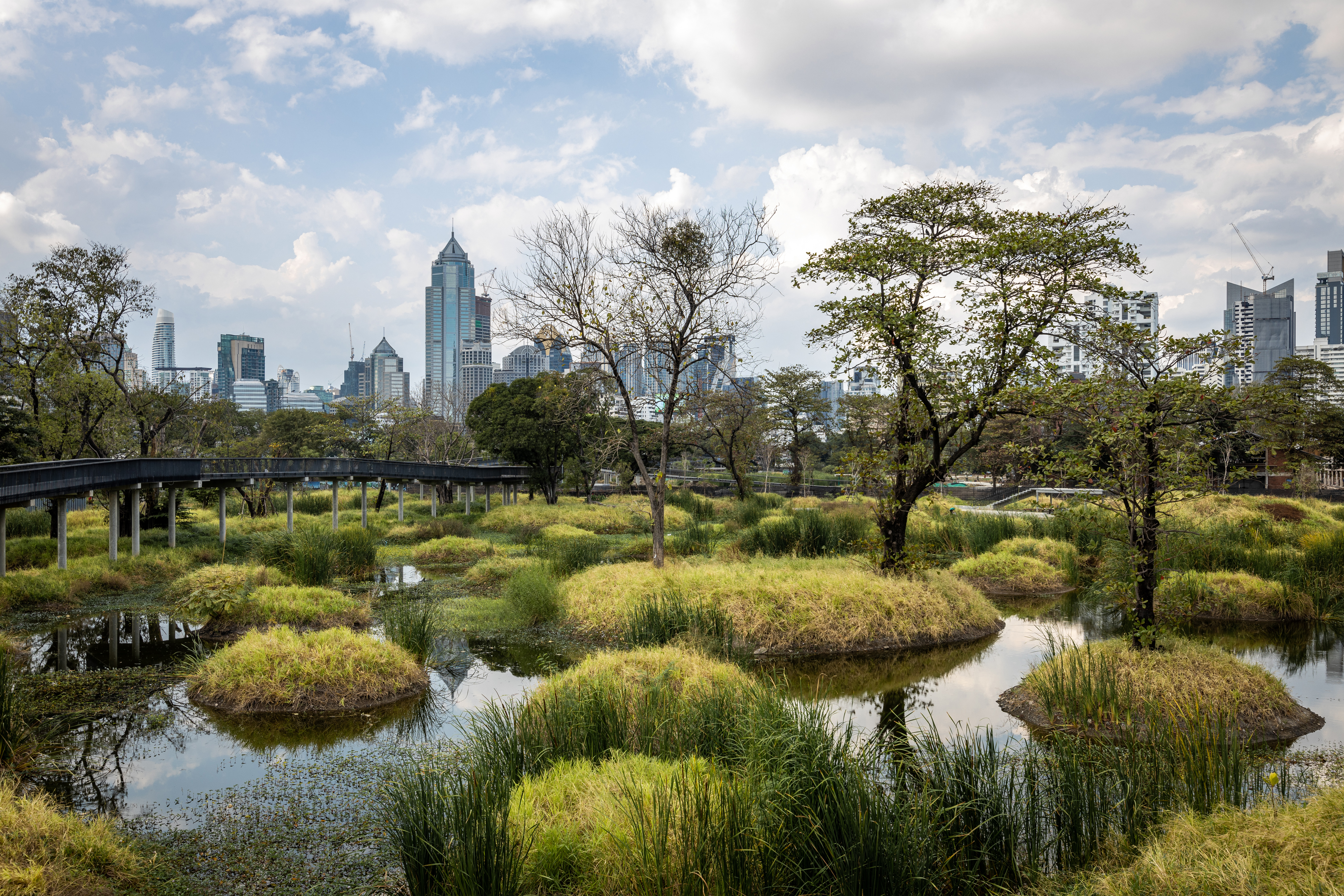
Wetlands

Benjakitti Park was designed using the sponge city concept to transform the former industrial site (Tobacco Monopolu) into an urban wetland park. The wetlands are designed to hold up to 200,000 cubic meters of stormwater from the surrounding area, rainwater in monsoon season, and improve water quality through natural filtration. They also provide habitats for various plants, birds, and other wildlife, supporting biodiversity in central Bangkok.

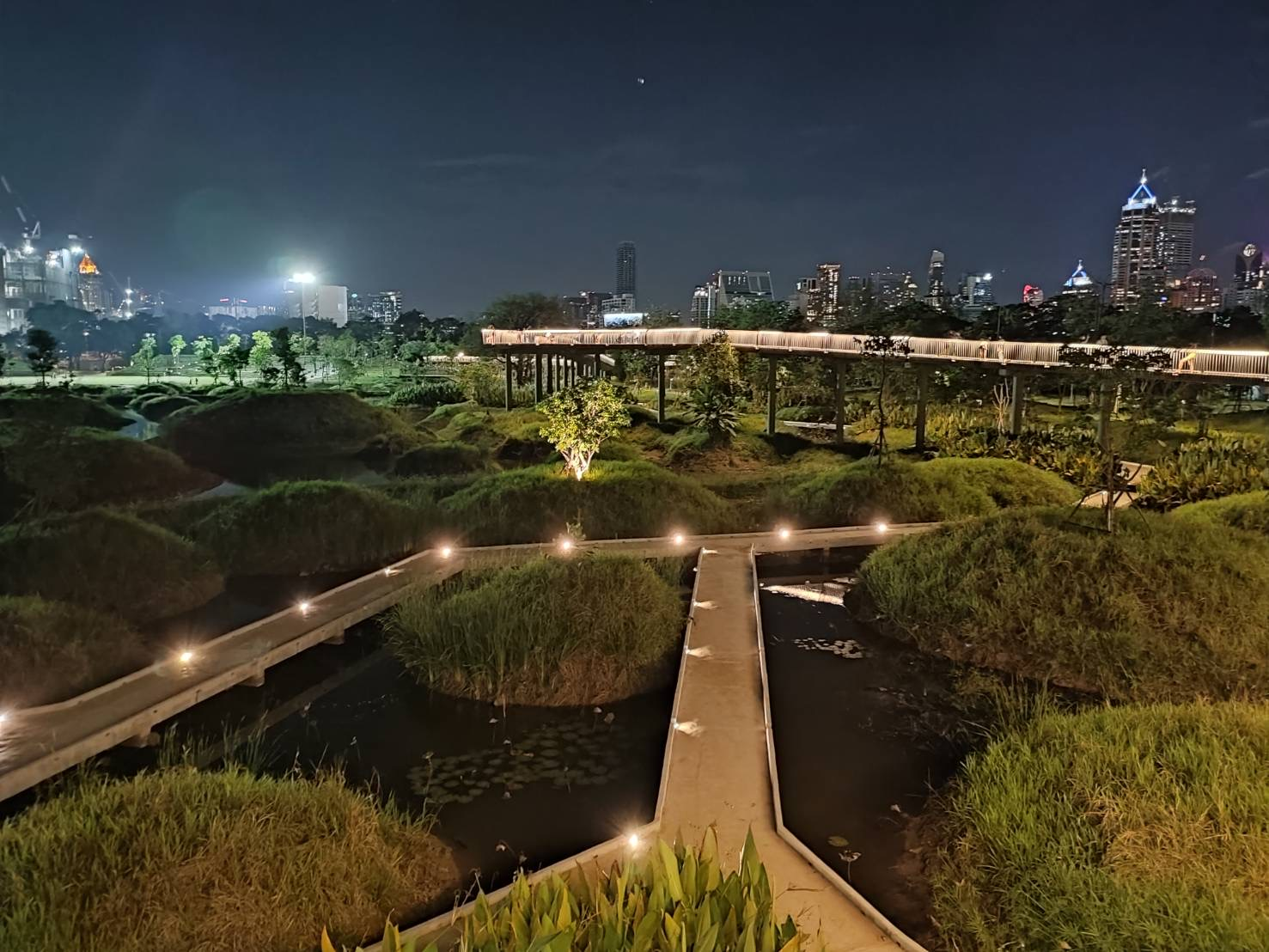
Walkways

=== Walkways ===
The park features elevated skywalks above the wetland areas, designed to connect visitors with nature to explore the wetlands, observe plants and wildlife, especially birds, and learn about the local ecosystem. They also provide spaces for walking, relaxation, and recreation.

== Activities ==
=== Walking, Running, and Cycling ===
Benjakitti Park provides several routes for outdoor exercise and recreation, including a 5.8-kilometer nature trail, a 2.8-kilometer running route, and a 3.4-kilometer cycling route. The park also features a 1.6-kilometer elevated skywalk through its forest and wetland areas.

=== Sports Facilities ===
The park contains an indoor sports center converted from former tobacco factory warehouses. The sports facilities are available for public recreational use, with booking through the BKK Active mobile application for certain activities.

The center provides facilities for a variety of sports
Sport	Number of Facilities	Location
Futsal	2 courts	Gymnasium 1
Table tennis	30 tables	Gymnasium 1
Badminton	10 courts	Gymnasium 2
Basketball (5-on-5)	1 court	Gymnasium 2
Basketball (3-on-3)	4 courts	Gymnasium 2
Pickleball	10 courts	Gymnasium 3
Volleyball	1 court	Gymnasium 3
Teqball	2 tables	Gymnasium 3
Skateboarding	1 area	Gymnasium 3
Spinning Bike	50 bikes	Gymnasium 3
Yoga	1 area	Gymnasium 3

=== Water Activities ===
The highlight of Benjakitti Park is water activities, including duck pedal boats and kayaking.

=== Other Recreational Facilities ===
The park provides a children's playground, outdoor exercise areas, and an amphitheater used for public activities and performances. Music events are also held in the park.

A dog park covers approximately 10 rai near Gate 1 on Ratchadaphisek Road. Dog owners are required to register before entering the area and must keep their dogs on leashes and follow the park's regulations.

The park also contains educational facilities, including a demonstration rice field and areas featuring native and rare plant species.

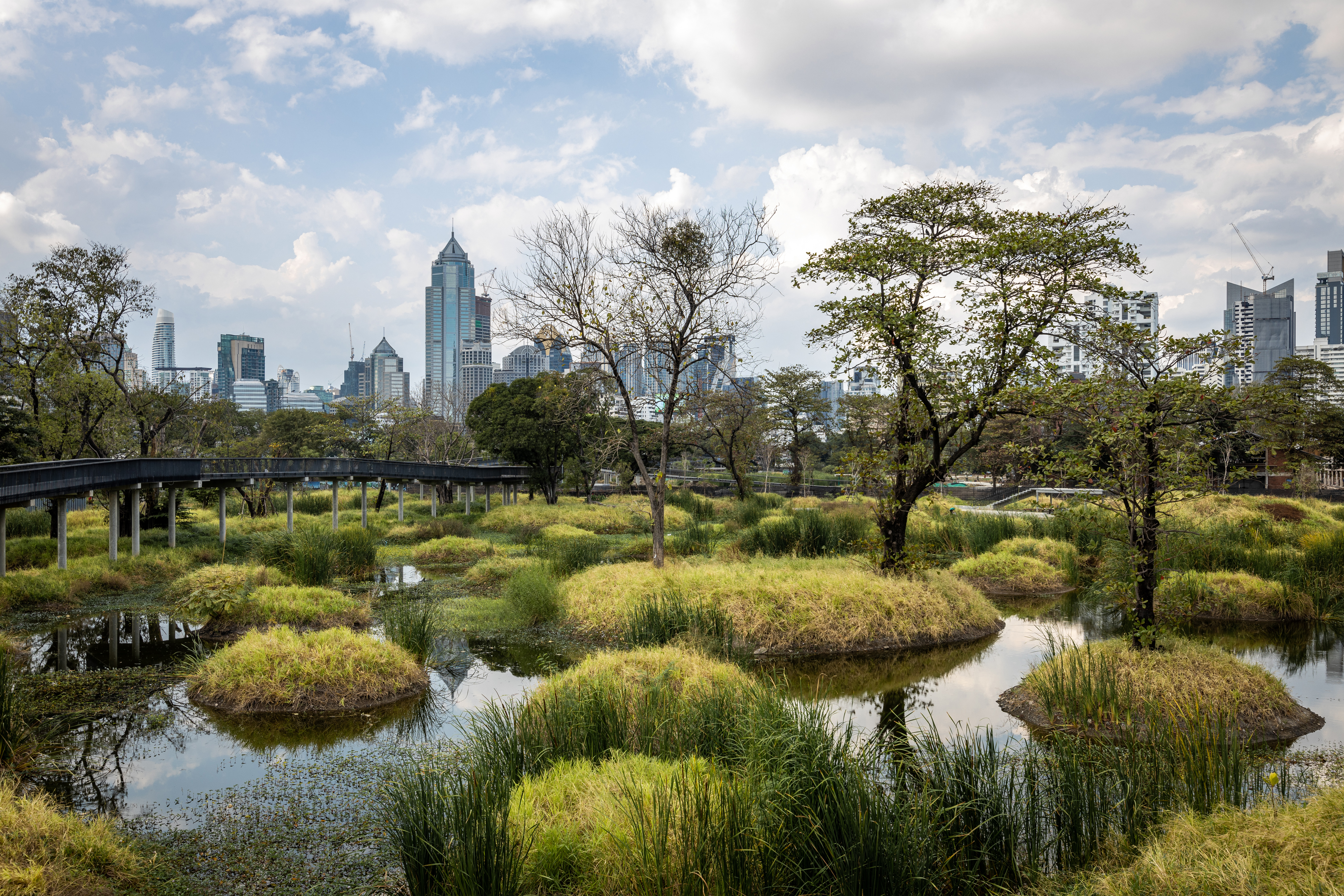
Wetland area and walkway in Forest Park

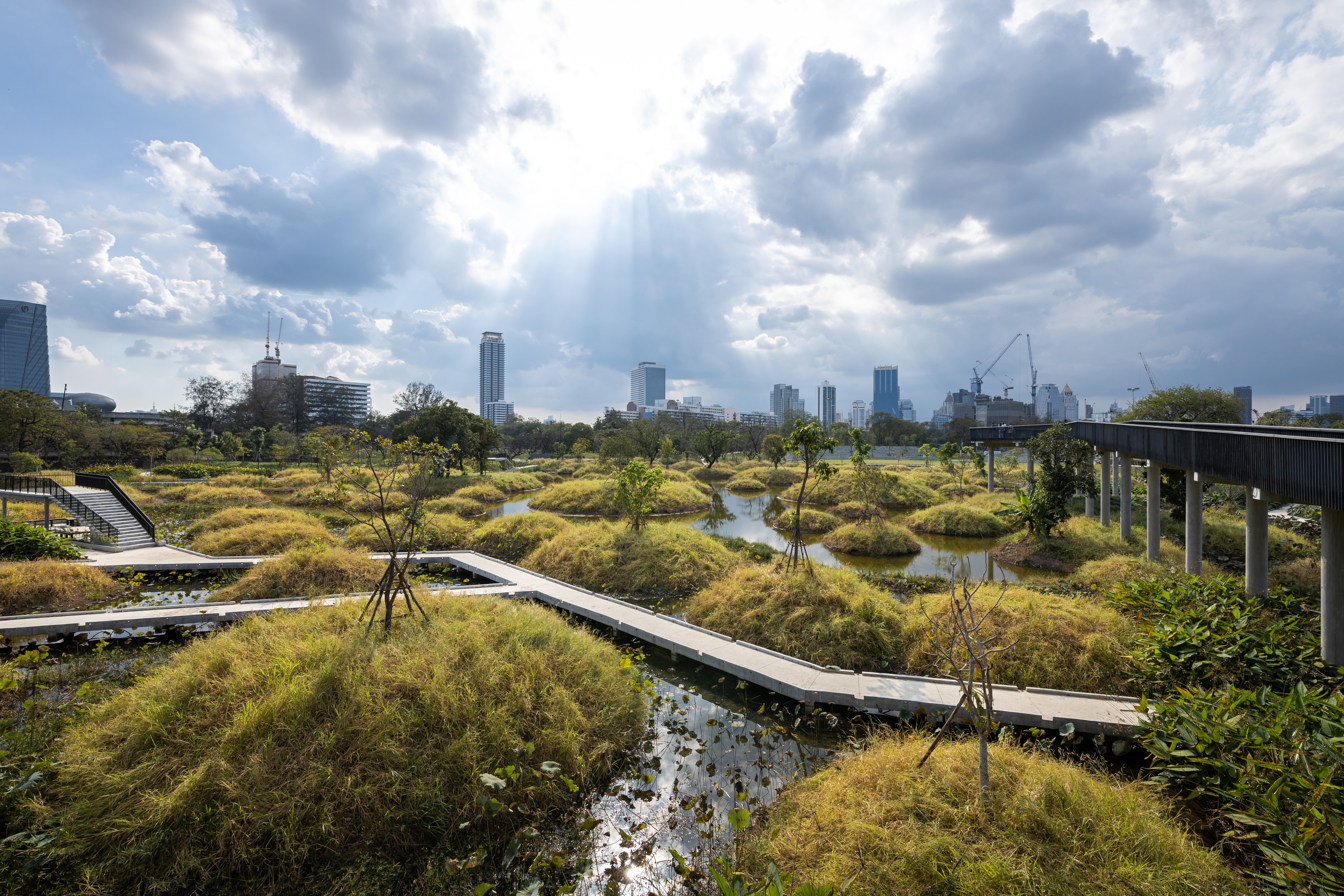
Walkways in Benjakitti Forest Park

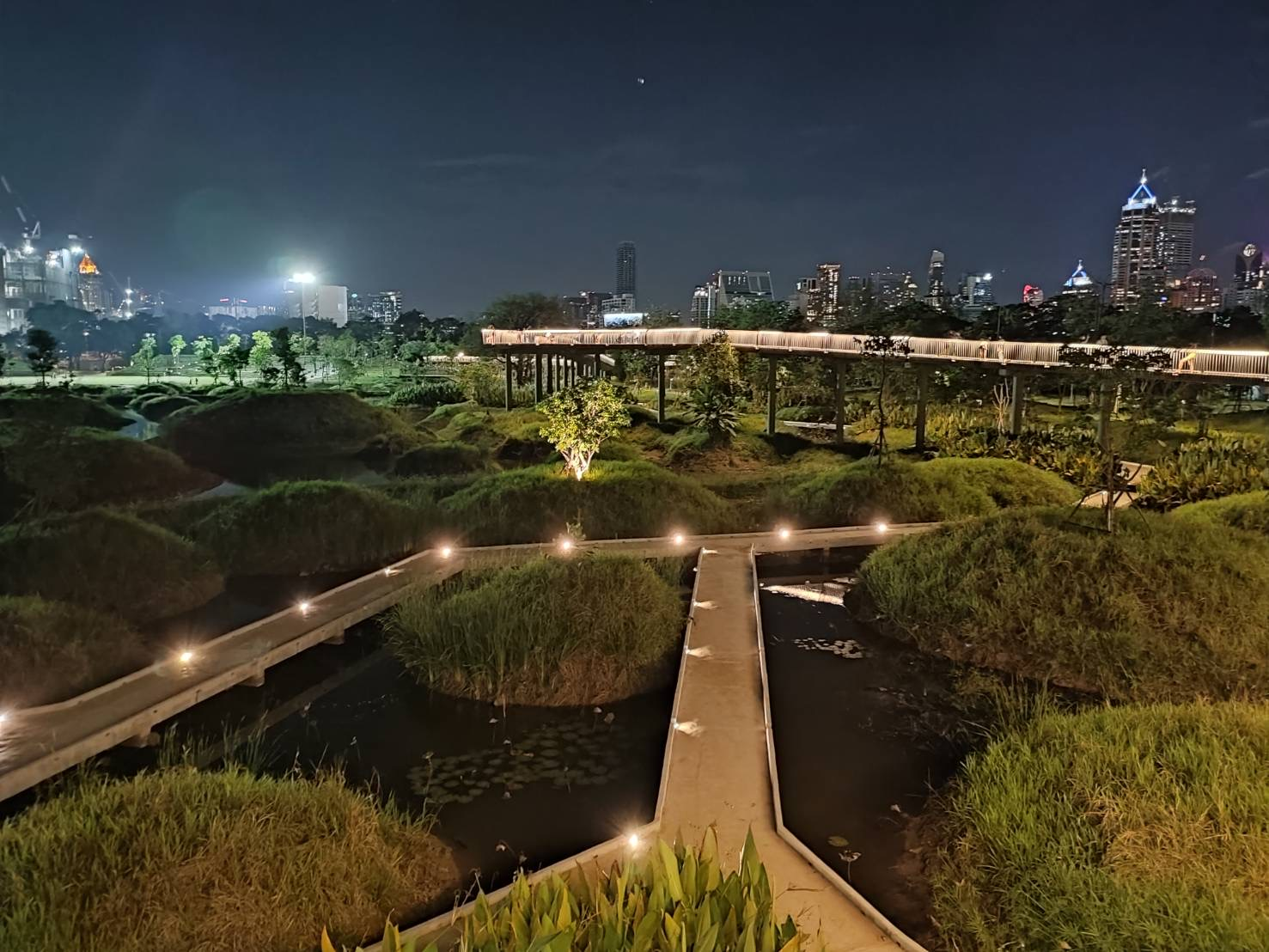
Walkways in Benjakitti Forest Park at night

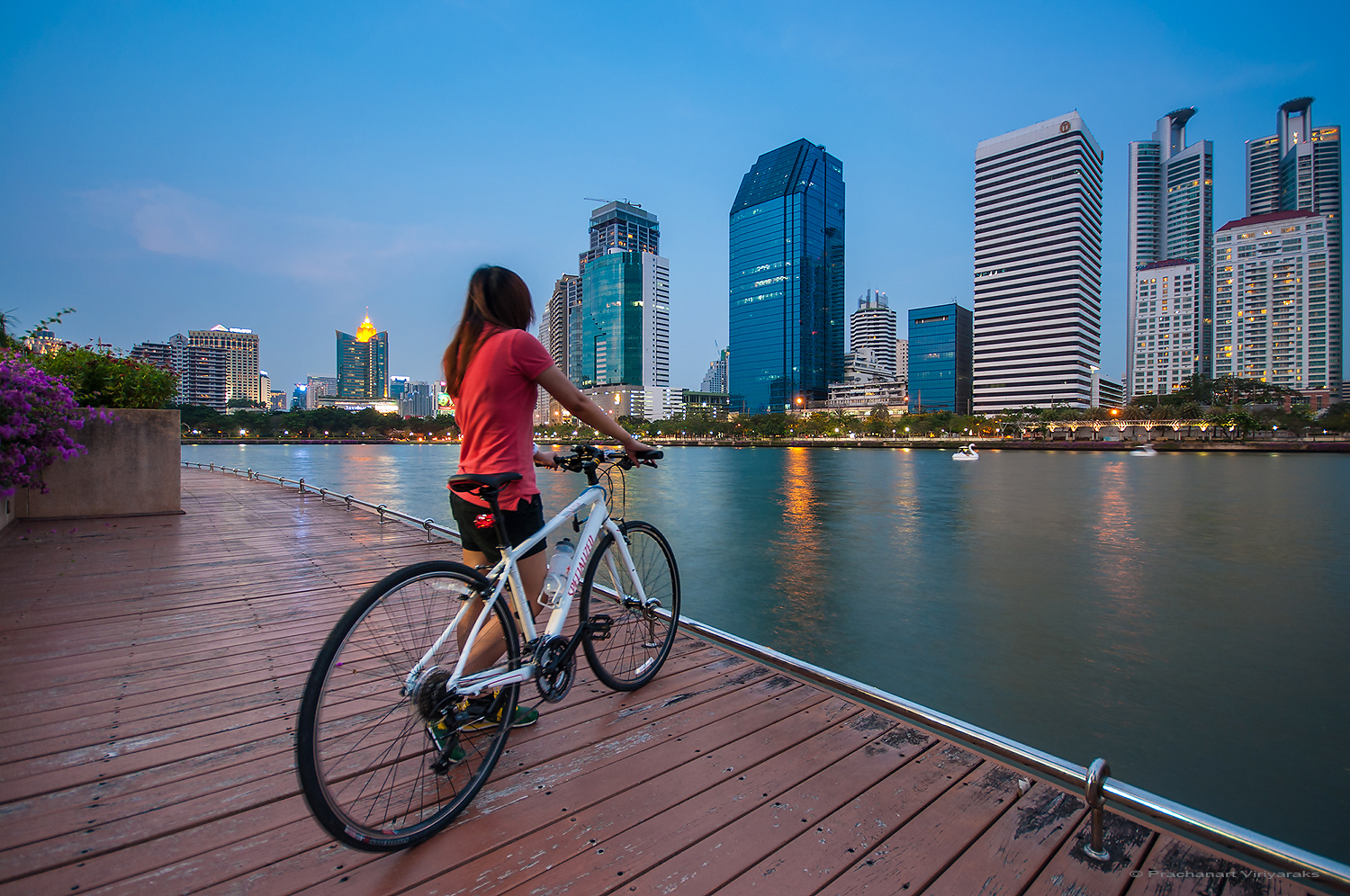
A woman with a bicycle at Benchakitti Park in Bangkok

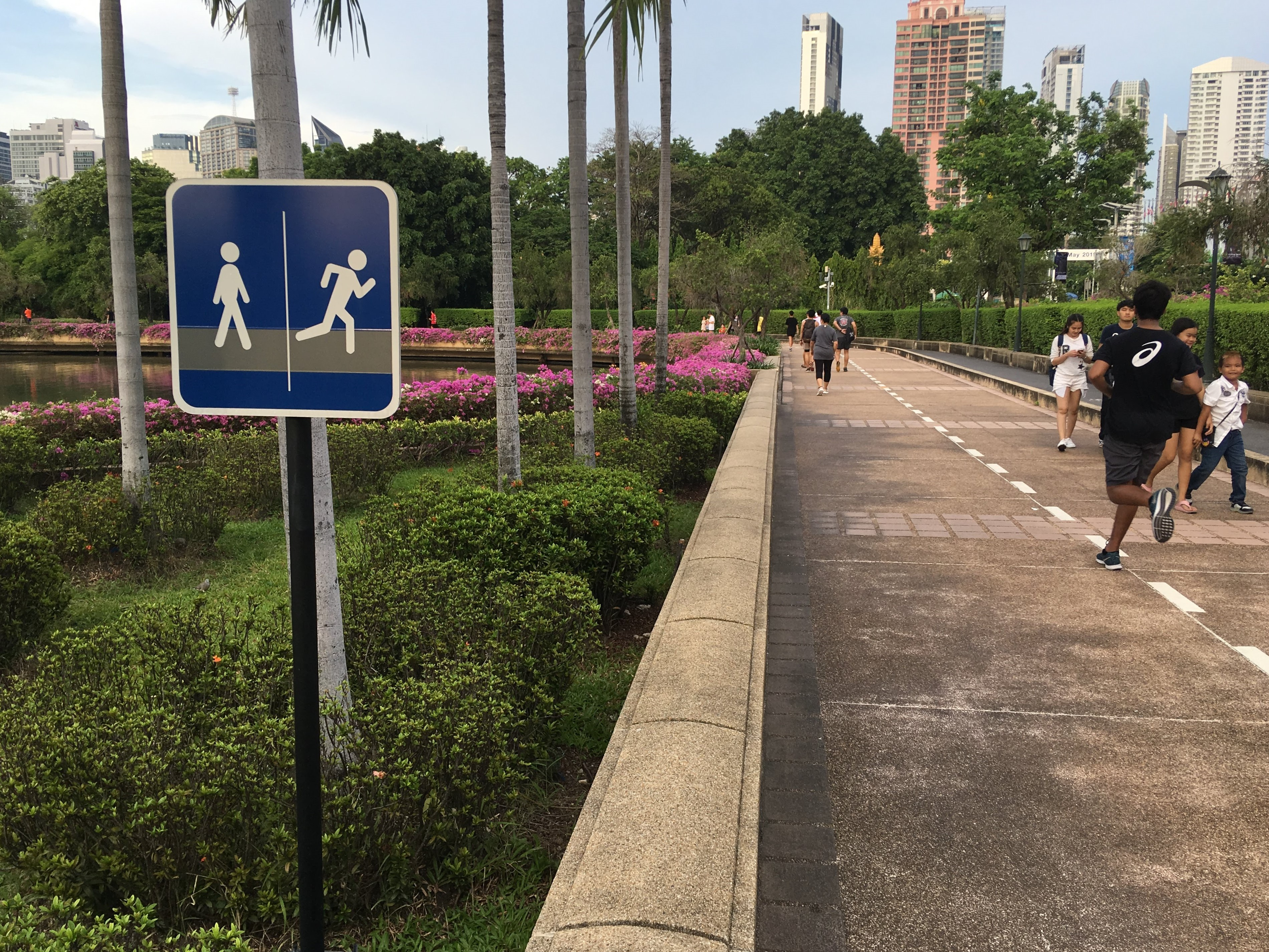
A walking path in the park

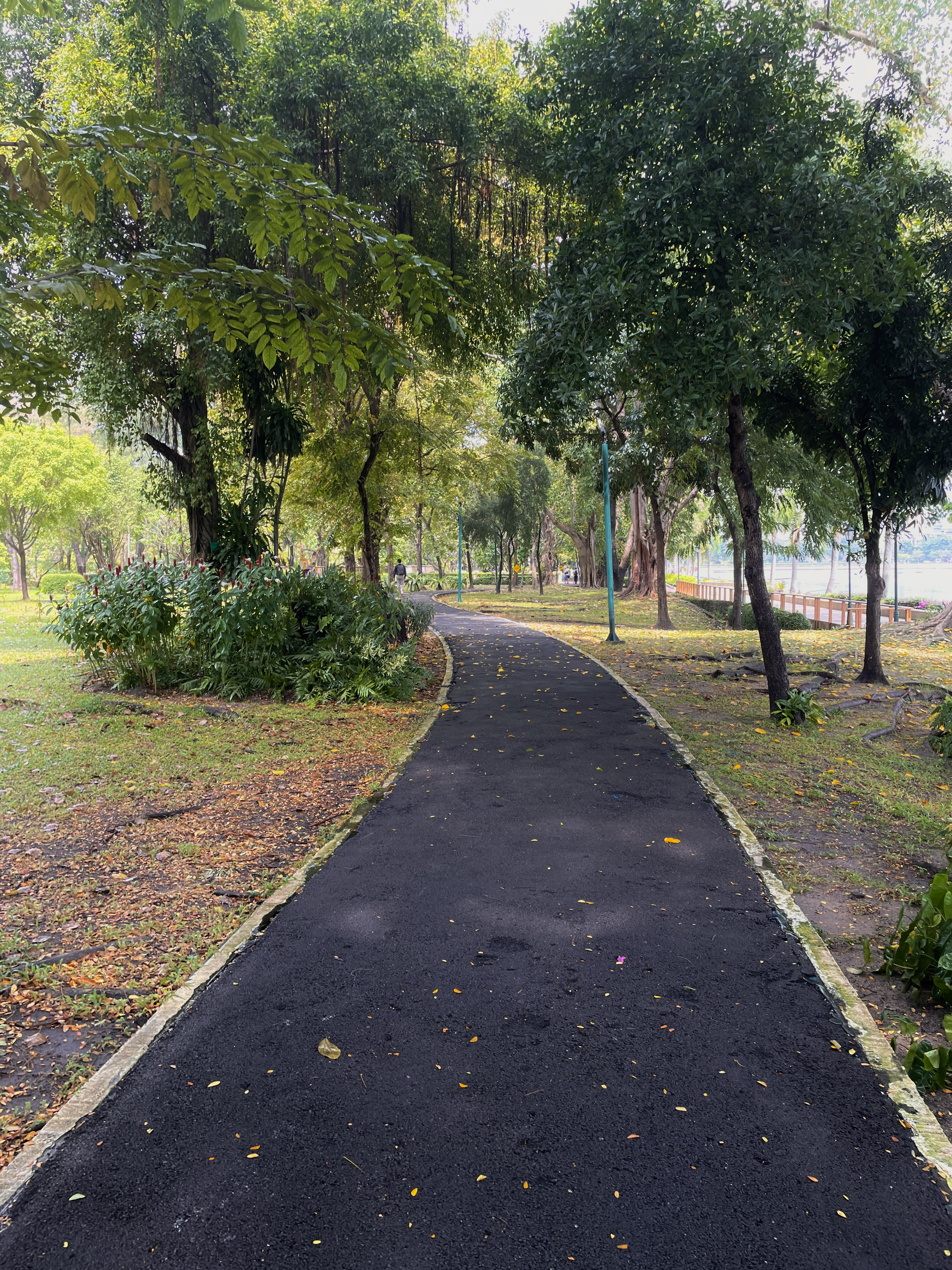
A walking path in the park

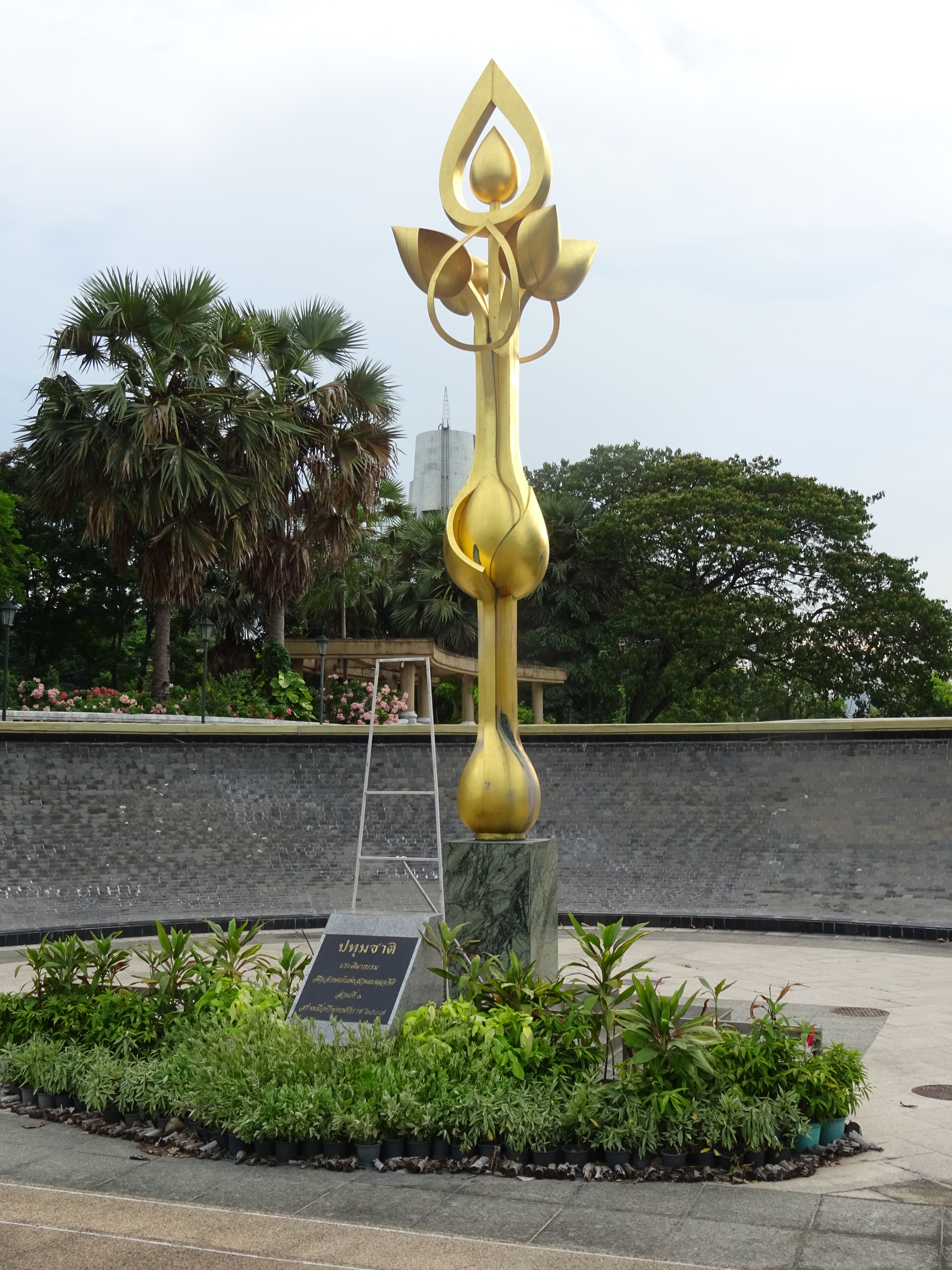
The 'Pathumchart' (lotus) sculpture belongs to and is the symbol of the park

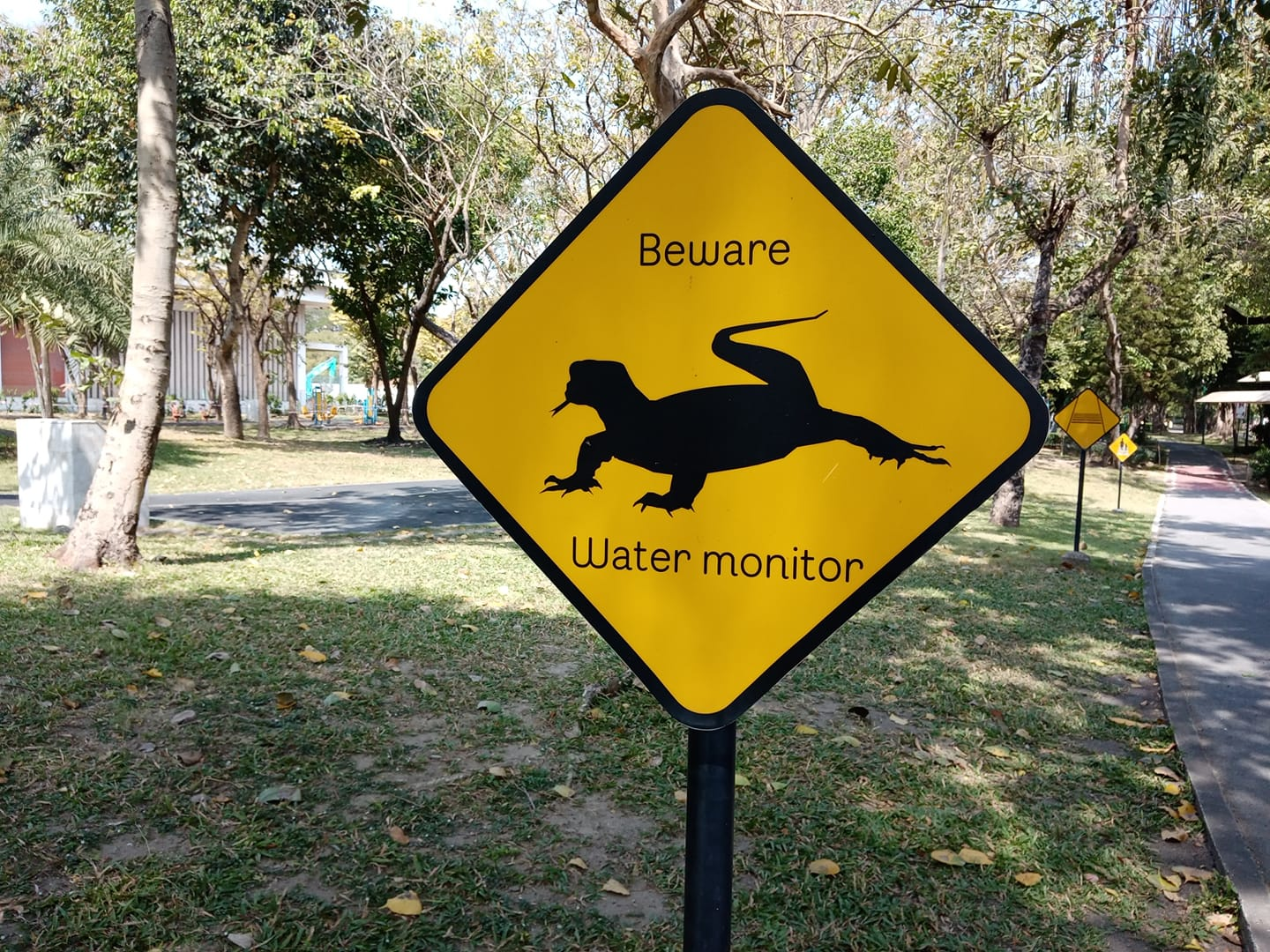

== Ecology ==
=== Vegetation ===
Benjakitti Forest Park has diverse vegetation that includes native trees, wetland plants, mangrove vegetation, freshwater swamp plants and dry evergreen forest species.

The park’s vegetation is managed with a low-maintenance philosophy known as “Messy Nature” that allows native plants to grow and develop semi-natural plant communities over time. Old trees were maintained and new seedlings were planted throughout the restored landscape. The park is also a learning space for native and rare plant species.

=== Fauna ===
Benjakitti Park is home to many species of fauna including birds, reptiles and water animals. Asian water monitors can sometimes be seen near the park’s ponds, wetlands and walking paths. The park’s diverse natural habitats also provide homes for a variety of resident and migratory birds.

Benjakitti Park is one of the notable birdwatching sites in Bangkok. Bird species observed in the park include Greater Coucal (Centropus sinensis), Indochinese Roller (Coracias affinis), Zebra Dove (Geopelia striata), White-breasted Waterhen (Amaurornis phoenicurus) and Scaly-breasted Munia (Lonchura punctulata). Other resident birds include the Coppersmith Barbet, Malaysian Pied Fantail and Oriental Magpie Robin, while migratory species such as the Yellow-browed Warbler and Asian Brown Flycatcher are seen during the winter months.
