= List of tallest structures in Thailand =

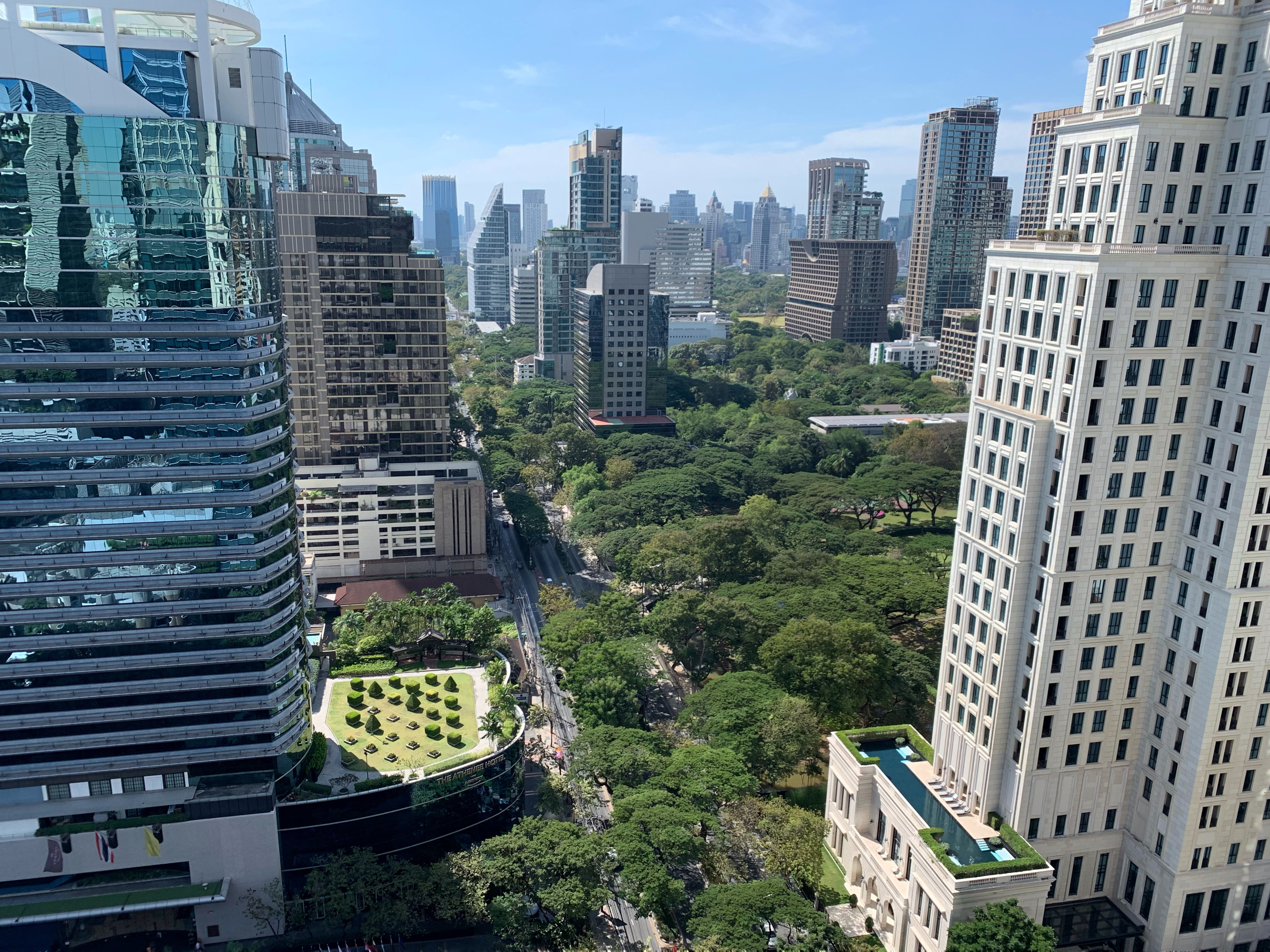
Skyscrapers around Witthayu Road in Bangkok

This list of tallest structures in Thailand ranks the tallest structures in Thailand by height. It covers completed and topped-out skyscrapers of at least 150 metres (492 feet), buildings under construction, approved and proposed towers, and non-building structures such as masts, chimneys and statues. Within the Bangkok Metropolitan Administration area alone, there are over 231 completed buildings that stand at least 150 metres (492 feet) in height.

According to the Council on Vertical Urbanism, known until October 2026 as the Council on Tall Buildings and Urban Habitat, Bangkok ranks 13th in the world by number of completed buildings of 150 metres or more.

The Greater Bangkok Metropolitan Region has the largest concentration of tall buildings in Thailand, followed by Pattaya and Chonburi on the Eastern Seaboard. There are, however, fewer opportunities to develop tall buildings in other populous urban centres such as Phuket and Chiang Mai due to strict building regulations. Environmental protection rules for Phuket long barred construction on land more than 80 metres above sea level and cap building heights at eight metres between 40 and 80 metres; a December 2024 notification opened land up to 140 metres to limited development, subject to a six-metre height limit and a 90-square-metre footprint. In Chiang Mai, building regulations introduced in 2016 allow the construction of high-rises in specified high-density zones outside the old city and its immediate surroundings.

== Tallest completed buildings ==
This list below ranks completed and topped out buildings in Thailand that stand at least 150 metres (492 feet) in height, based on standard height measurement, which includes spires and architectural details, but excludes antenna masts. The heights of these buildings have been sourced from the database of the Council on Vertical Urbanism (CVU), which used the name Council on Tall Buildings and Urban Habitat until October 2025, as well as from environmental impact assessment (EIA) reports and SkyscraperPage, which is a website dedicated to providing information and discussion about high-rise buildings.

Was Thailand's tallest building upon completion
Indicates buildings that have topped out

Rank	Building	Image	City	Height		Floors	Year	Coordinates	Notes
1	Magnolias Waterfront Residences Iconsiam		Bangkok	315 m	1,033 ft	70	2018	13.7273°N 100.5105°E	Tallest building in Bangkok and Thailand.
2	King Power MahaNakhon		Bangkok	314 m	1,030 ft	78	2016	13.72340°N 100.52840°E	Tallest building in Thailand by height to roof.
3	Baiyoke Tower II		Bangkok	304 m	997 ft	88	1997	13.75459°N 100.54036°E	Tallest building in Thailand from 1997 to 2016. Briefly the world's tallest hotel and tallest building in Southeast Asia until the completion of Petronas Towers. Height counting the antenna is 328.4 m (1,077 ft).
4	Four Seasons Private Residences		Bangkok	299.5 m	983 ft	74	2019	13.71240°N 100.51057°E	Official height is 300.1m measured to top of roof (finished floor level) per updated environmental approval ทส10009.5/10758, dated 5/2/2018. CTBUH: 299.5 m (983 ft)
5	Dusit Residences		Bangkok	299.1 m	981 ft	69	2026		Topped-out
6	One City Centre		Bangkok	275.7 m	905 ft	61	2023	13.74192°N 100.54612°E	Tallest office building in Thailand.
7	Mandarin Oriental Residences Bangkok		Bangkok	272 m	892 ft	52	2018	13.72778°N 100.51096°E	
8	The River South Tower		Bangkok	265 m	869 ft	74	2012	13.72110°N 100.51062°E	
9	Kingbridge Tower		Bangkok	260 m	850 ft	43	2024	13.673739°N 100.539964°E	
10	Canapaya Residences		Bangkok	253 m	830 ft	57	2019	13.68768°N 100.51365°E	
11 =	One9Five Asoke-Rama 9 Tower I		Bangkok	248 m	814 ft	61	2021	13.75803°N 100.56829°E	
11 =	One9Five Asoke-Rama 9 Tower II		Bangkok	248 m	814 ft	61	2021	13.75680°N 100.56812°E	
13	State Tower		Bangkok	247.2 m	811 ft	68	2001	13.72175°N 100.51716°E	Briefly the tallest mixed-use skyscraper in Thailand until completion of the King Power MahaNakhon.
14	E18hteen Seven		Bangkok	247 m	810 ft	57	2025	13.728429°N 100.546546°E	
15 =	CRC Tower		Bangkok	245 m	804 ft	53	2001	13.73907°N 100.54787°E	Also known as All Seasons Place. Total height measured to top of structural spire; 210m to rooftop level
15 =	One Bangkok Tower 4		Bangkok	245 m	804 ft	52	2024	13.72707°N 100.54592°E	
17	One Bangkok Tower 3		Bangkok	243 m	797 ft	50	2024	13.72640°N 100.54692°E	
18	Magnolias Ratchadamri Boulevard		Bangkok	242 m	794 ft	60	2016	13.74240°N 100.54081°E	Also known as Waldorf Astoria + Magnolias Ratchaprasong
19	Fraser Suites One Bangkok		Bangkok	241 m	791 ft	49	2026	13.72640°N 100.54692°E	
20	The Unicorn Phayathai		Bangkok	240 m	790 ft	51	2023	13.75663°N 100.53287°E	
21	Menam Residences		Bangkok	239.3 m	785 ft	59	2017	13.70657°N 100.50590°E	
22	The ESSE Asoke		Bangkok	237 m	778 ft	55	2019	13.74313°N 100.56156°E	
23	Centara Grand		Bangkok	235 m	771 ft	57	2008	13.74778°N 100.53852°E	
24	Reflection Jomtien Beach Oceanfront Tower		Pattaya	234 m	768 ft	57	2013	12.86444°N 100.89411°E	Currently the tallest building in Pattaya
25	The Met		Bangkok	230.6 m	757 ft	69	2009	13.72208°N 100.53423°E	
26	Park Origin Thonglor Tower C		Bangkok	229.85 m	754.1 ft	59	2022	13.73278°N 100.58490°E	
27	Empire Tower		Bangkok	226.8 m	744 ft	62	1999	13.72043°N 100.53020°E	
28	North Point Tower 1		Pattaya	226 m	741 ft	27	2010	12.96157°N 100.88555°E	
29	MARQUE Sukhumvit		Bangkok	222.5 m	730 ft	52	2017	13.73049°N 100.57110°E	
30	KingsQuare Residence		Yan Nawa	222 m	728 ft	52	2026		
30	Summit Tower		Bangkok	221 m	725 ft	46	2025	13.752468°N 100.532108°E	
31	Jewelry Trade Center		Bangkok	220.7 m	724 ft	59	1996	13.72297°N 100.52004°E	Tallest building in Thailand from 1996 to 1997
32	The Pano		Bangkok	220 m	720 ft	57	2010	13.67172°N 100.54136°E	
33	One98 Wireless		Bangkok	216 m	709 ft	52	2024	13.7286°N 100.54567°E	Also known as One Bangkok Ritz Carlton
34	The Address Siam-Rathathewi		Bangkok	215 m	705 ft	50	2023	13.75243°N 100.53039°E	
35	The Politan Aqua West Tower		Nonthaburi	214.3 m	703 ft	61	2020	13.87565°N 100.47959°E	Tallest building in Nonthaburi
36	Supalai Icon Sathorn		Bangkok	214 m	702 ft	56	2024	13.72323°N 100.53803°E	
37	Noble Form Thonglor		Bangkok	210.75 m	691.4	46	2025	13.735427°N 100.583928°E	
38	Nimit Langsuan		Bangkok	210 m	690 ft	53	2024	13.7351°N 100.54136°E	
39	The Politan Aqua East Tower		Nonthaburi	208 m	682 ft	61	2020	13.87565°N 100.47959°E	
40	Kasikorn Bank Head Office		Bangkok	207.6 m	681 ft	42	1995	13.68038°N 100.51481°E	Tallest building in Thailand from 1995 to 1996
41 =	Arom Wongamat		Pattaya	206 m	676 ft	55	2024	12.96518°N 100.88468°E	Structurally Topped Out
41 =	Ashton Silom		Bangkok	206 m	676 ft	48	2019	13.72633°N 100.52689°E	Structural height to top of fin 206m; 181m to top of roof
41 =	Jasmine International Tower		Nonthaburi	206 m	676 ft	41	1997	13.905255°N 100.520954°E	
44	Park Origin Chula-Samyan		Bangkok	205 m	673 ft	47	2023	13.7315°N 100.52216°E	
45	StarView Condo Tower B		Bangkok	204 m	669 ft	54	2015	13.68816°N 100.51824°E	
46 =	The Offices at CentralWorld		Bangkok	204 m	669 ft	51	2004	13.74605°N 100.53836°E	Also known as Central World Tower total height is measured to top of architectural element (fins), 198.8m to roof level.
46 =	Park Silom		Bangkok	204 m	669 ft	38	2023	13.72772°N 100.53354°E	
48	Ashton Chula-Silom		Bangkok	203.8 m	669 ft	56	2018	13.73135°N 100.53102°E	
49	CLOUD Thonglor-Phetchaburi		Bangkok	202 m	663 ft	55	2022	13.74589°N 100.57661°E	
50	Singha Complex Tower 1		Bangkok	201.3 m	660 ft	36	2018	13.74809°N 100.56472°E	
51	CLOUD Residences Sukhumvit 23		Bangkok	200 m	660 ft	43	2025	13.738941°N 100.564981°E	
52 =	Millennium Residence Tower II		Bangkok	199.3 m	654 ft	54	2009	13.72971°N 100.56271°E	
52 =	Millennium Residence Tower III		Bangkok	199.3 m	654 ft	54	2009	13.72971°N 100.56271°E	
54	M Silom		Bangkok	198 m	650 ft	53	2015	13.72724°N 100.52703°E	
55	Grande Centre Point Ratchadamri		Bangkok	197 m	646 ft	50	2007	13.74174°N 100.54105°E	
56	Siamese Sukhumvit 48		Bangkok	196 m	643 ft	39	2020	13.70905°N 100.59855°E	
57	Grande Centre Point Prestige		Bangkok	195 m	640 ft	45	2025	13.74174°N 100.54105°E	
57	Sinn Sathorn Tower		Bangkok	195 m	640 ft	43	1993	13.72172°N 100.49938°E	Tallest building in Thailand from 1993 to 1996
58	Siamese residence landmark @ MRTA station		Bangkok	195 m	640 ft	38	2024	13.756298°N 100.583754°E	
59	Grande Centre Point Lumpini		Bangkok	194.8 m	639 ft	41	2025	13.724632°N 100.547546°E	
60	Thai Wah Tower II		Bangkok	194 m	636 ft	60	1996	13.72364°N 100.53987°E	
61 =	Ashton Asoke		Bangkok	193 m	633 ft	57	2017	13.73900°N 100.56090°E	
61 =	Whizdom The Forestias Destinia Tower		Samut Prakan	193 m	633 ft	50	2024	13.653278°N 100.664364°E	
63	Circle 2 Living Prototype		Bangkok	192.63 m	632.0 ft	53	2015	13.75097°N 100.55643°E	
64 =	Millennium Residence Tower I		Bangkok	192.3 m	631 ft	51	2009	13.72979°N 100.56272°E	
64 =	Millennium Residence Tower IV		Bangkok	192.3 m	631 ft	51	2009	13.72979°N 100.56272°E	
66 =	Napalai Place		Hat Yai	192 m	630 ft	46	1999	6.99949°N 100.48080°E	Tallest building in Hat Yai
66 =	Krungsri Ploenchit Tower		Bangkok	192 m	630 ft	39	2018	13.74289°N 100.54700°E	
68 =	Cyber World Tower 1		Bangkok	190 m	620 ft	53	2009	13.77011°N 100.57379°E	
68 =	Noble BE19		Bangkok	190 m	620 ft	48	2020	13.74221°N 100.55951°E	
70	28 Chidlom		Bangkok	189 m	620 ft	48	2020	13.74686°N 100.54358°E	
71	Watermark Chaophraya Tower A		Bangkok	188.8 m	619 ft	52	2008	13.70929°N 100.50155°E	
72	The Bangkok Sathorn		Bangkok	188.6 m	619 ft	53	2017	13.71863°N 100.52031°E	
73 =	Zire Wongamat South Tower		Pattaya	188 m	617 ft	54	2014	12.96144°N 100.88558°E	
73 =	The Issara Ladprao		Bangkok	188 m	617 ft	51	2011	13.80865°N 100.56740°E	
73 =	The Empire Place		Bangkok	188 m	617 ft	45	2008	13.71923°N 100.53108°E	
76	Park Origin Thonglor Tower B		Bangkok	187.65 m	615.6 ft	53	2022	13.73247°N 100.58466°E	
77	Copacabana Beach Jomtien		Pattaya	187.5 m	615 ft	59	2023	12.89102°N 100.87464°E	
78	The Lumpini 24		Bangkok	187.4 m	615 ft	54	2017	13.72273°N 100.56614°E	Also known as Lumpini Sukhumvit 24
79 =	Abdulrahim Place		Bangkok	187 m	614 ft	34	1996	13.72742°N 100.53855°E	
80 =	United Center		Bangkok	187 m	614 ft	55	1995	13.72711°N 100.53160°E	
81	The Politan Rive		Nonthaburi	186.5 m	612 ft	56	2019	13.87392°N 100.47921°E	
82 =	Park Origin Phrom Phong Tower B		Bangkok	186 m	610 ft	51	2017	13.72574°N 100.56551°E	
82 =	Park Origin Phrom Phong Tower A		Bangkok	186 m	610 ft	50	2018	13.72464°N 100.56597°E	
84	Noble Ploenchit Tower B		Bangkok	185 m	607 ft	52	2016	13.74377°N 100.54855°E	
85 =	AIA Rachada 2		Huai Khwang	183.5 m	602 ft	34	2026		
86	Whizdom The Forestias Mytopia Tower		Samut Prakan	182.9	600 ft	42	2024	13.653278°N 100.664364°E	
87	Reflection Jomtien Beach Oceanview Tower		Pattaya	182.8 m	600 ft	44	2013	12.86512°N 100.89511°E	
88	Dusit Central Park Office		Bangkok	182.6 m	599 ft	40	2025	13.728198°N 100.537589°E	
89	Sathorn Square Office Tower		Bangkok	181.4 m	595 ft	41	2011	13.72235°N 100.52930°E	
90 =	Pattaya Park Tower		Pattaya	180 m	590 ft	55	1995	12.90641°N 100.86317°E	Measures 240 metres considering the observation tower.
90 =	Whizdom Essence Sukhumvit		Bangkok	180 m	590 ft	50	2019	13.68604°N 100.61241°E	
90 =	Bhiraj Tower at EmQuartier		Bangkok	180 m	590 ft	45	2015	13.73117°N 100.56973°E	
90 =	The ESSE at Singha Complex		Bangkok	180 m	590 ft	39	2019	13.74808°N 100.56379°E	
90 =	Pier 111		Bangkok	180 m	590 ft	35	2023	13.74833°N 100.54245°E	
90 =	Tipco Tower		Bangkok	180 m	590 ft	34	1996	13.7879838°N 100.5359528°E	
96	Park Hyatt Bangkok		Bangkok	179.4 m	589 ft	37	2016	13.74389°N 100.54699°E	
97	Dusit Thani Bangkok Hotel		Bangkok	179 m	587 ft	39	2025	13.728198°N 100.537589°E	
98	RHYTHM Phahon-Ari		Bangkok	177.8 m	583 ft	54	2014	13.78888°N 100.54520°E	
99	Grande Centre Point Terminal 21		Bangkok	177.4 m	582 ft	30	2011	13.73774°N 100.56061°E	
100 =	Banyan Tree Residences Riverside Bangkok		Bangkok	177 m	581 ft	45	2019	13.73273°N 100.50999°E	
100 =	North Point Tower 2		Pattaya	177 m	581 ft	46	2010	12.96187°N 100.88614°E	
102 =	The ESSE Sukhumvit 36		Bangkok	176 m	577 ft	43	2020	13.72415°N 100.57773°E	
102 =	The St. Regis Bangkok		Bangkok	176 m	577 ft	46	2011	13.73985°N 100.53998°E	
104 =	Reference Sathorn Wongwian Yai		Bangkok	175 m	574 ft	51	2024	13.719486°N 100.494052°E	
104 =	Exchange Tower		Bangkok	175 m	574 ft	46	2004	13.73552°N 100.56161°E	
106	Sathorn House		Bangkok	174.2 m	572 ft	50	1999	13.72016°N 100.52127°E	
107	Q Sukhumvit		Bangkok	174 m	571 ft	40	2018	13.73994°N 100.55532°E	
108 =	The Monument Thong Lo		Bangkok	173 m	568 ft	45	2019	13.74177°N 100.58550°E	
108 =	The Hansar Hotel & Residence		Bangkok	173 m	568 ft	43	2011	13.74039°N 100.54130°E	
108 =	Whizdom The Forestias Petopia Tower		Samut Prakan	173 m	568 ft	43	2024	13.653335°N 100.664208°E	
111	Hyde Heritage Thonglor		Bangkok	171.80 m	563.6 ft	44	2022	13.72240°N 100.58193°E	
112	The Line Sukhumvit 101		Bangkok	171.50 m	562.7 ft	37	2020	13.69234°N 100.60832°E	
113	UOB Plaza		Bangkok	171 m	561 ft	31	2022	13.72940°N 100.57026°E	CTBUH: 126 m (413 ft)
114	EXAT Building		Bangkok	170 m	560 ft	28	2020	13.75053°N 100.56809°E	Also known as Expressway Authority Building.
115	Arom Jomtien		Pattaya	170 m	560 ft	45	2025		Structurally Topped Out
115 =	66 Tower		Bangkok	168.50 m	552.8 ft	30	2021	13.68202°N 100.61001°E	Tallest building in Bang Na.
117	Q Asoke		Bangkok	168.45 m	552.7 ft	41	2015	13.74864°N 100.56299°E	
118	KnightsBridge Prime Sathorn		Bangkok	168.25 m	552.0 ft	44	2019	13.71694°N 100.53361°E	
119 =	Ashton Asok-Rama 9 Omega Tower		Bangkok	168 m	551 ft	49	2020	13.75540°N 100.56454°E	
119 =	Column Tower		Bangkok	168 m	551 ft	42	2007	13.73319°N 100.56062°E	
121	AIA East Gateway		Bangkok	167.6 m	550 ft	33	2023	13.666046°N 100.648095°E	
122	Hyde Sukhumvit 13		Bangkok	167.5 m	550 ft	40	2014	13.74067°N 100.55729°E	
123	Windshell Naradhiwas		Bangkok	167.25 m	548.7 ft	28	2019	13.70615°N 100.53885°E	
124 =	Oakwood Hotel & Residence Sri Racha		Chonburi	167 m	548 ft	44	2017	13.16853°N 100.92602°E	
124 =	Emporium Suites		Bangkok	167 m	548 ft	46	1998	13.73040°N 100.56887°E	
124 =	Hyde Sukhumvit 11		Bangkok	167 m	548 ft	39	2018	13.74396°N 100.55640°E	
124 =	Somkid Tower		Bangkok	167 m	548 ft	35	2007	13.74758°N 100.54566°E	
128 =	StarView Condo Tower A		Bangkok	166 m	545 ft	44	2015	13.68816°N 100.51824°E	
128 =	Tait Sathorn 12		Bangkok	166 m	545 ft	40	2023	13.72258°N 100.52620°E	
130 =	Supalai Prima Riva		Bangkok	165.7 m	544 ft	51	2015	13.68871°N 100.54914°E	
130 =	Skyrise Avenue Sukhumvit 64 Tower VI		Bangkok	165.7 m	544 ft	49	2024	13.683619°N 100.607191°E	
132 =	The Sukhothai Residences		Bangkok	165.1 m	542 ft	41	2011	13.72155°N 100.54149°E	
132 =	Sapphire Rama 3		Bangkok	165 m	541 ft	46	2023	13.67394°N 100.53835°E	
132 =	V44 Tower		Bangkok	165 m	541 ft	44	2025	13.756175°N 100.572267°E	
132 =	Noble Ploenchit Tower C		Bangkok	165 m	541 ft	47	2016	13.74368°N 100.54867°E	
132 =	Cyber World Tower 2		Bangkok	165 m	541 ft	48	2008	13.77028°N 100.57366°E	
132 =	The Waterford Diamond		Bangkok	165 m	541 ft	46	1999	13.72709°N 100.57354°E	
132 =	Italthai Tower		Bangkok	165 m	541 ft	44	1997	13.74673°N 100.57375°E	
132 =	Amanta Lumpini		Bangkok	165 m	541 ft	44	2009	13.72329°N 100.55122°E	
132 =	Interchange 21		Bangkok	165 m	541 ft	36	2008	13.73662°N 100.56204°E	
132 =	Aguston Sukhumvit 22 Tower A		Bangkok	165 m	541 ft	35	2010	13.72528°N 100.56427°E	
142 =	Bright Wongwian Yai		Bangkok	164.9 m	541 ft	46	2018	13.71971°N 100.49055°E	
142 =	RS Tower		Bangkok	164.9 m	541 ft	41	1996	13.76748°N 100.57061°E	
144 =	Rhythm Charoen Krung Pavilion		Bangkok	164 m	538 ft	44	2024	13.709492°N 100.511794°E	
144 =	The Issara Ladprao Tower II		Bangkok	164 m	538 ft	47	2011	13.80861°N 100.56757°E	
144 =	The Loft Silom		Bangkok	164 m	538 ft	37	2020	13.72349°N 100.52237°E	
147	Gems Tower		Bangkok	163 m	535 ft	39	1994	13.72412°N 100.51679°E	
148	Ideo Q Sukhumvit 36		Bangkok	162.945 m	534.60 ft	47	2020	13.72115°N 100.57652°E	
149	Fullerton Sukhumvit		Bangkok	162.6 m	533 ft	37	2006	13.72216°N 100.58225°E	
150 =	Skyrise Avenue Sukhumvit 64 Tower I		Bangkok	162.5 m	533 ft	48	2025	13.683619°N 100.607191°E	
150 =	Skyrise Avenue Sukhumvit 64 Tower II		Bangkok	162.5 m	533 ft	48	2025	13.683619°N 100.607191°E	
152 =	Kronos Office Tower		Bangkok	162 m	531 ft	26	2021	13.72473°N 100.53866°E	
153 =	Q Chidlom-Phetchaburi		Bangkok	162 m	531 ft	42	2018	13.74936°N 100.54386°E	
154 =	Samyan Mitrtown Office Tower		Bangkok	162 m	531 ft	31	2019	13.73354°N 100.52818°E	
154 =	Oka Haus Sukhumvit 36		Bangkok	162 m	531 ft	47	2020	13.71599°N 100.57487°E	
156 =	O-NES Tower		Bangkok	161 m	528 ft	29	2021	13.74043°N 100.55495°E	
156 =	Sky Walk Residences		Bangkok	161 m	528 ft	47	2012	13.71477°N 100.59344°E	
156 =	Park Origin Ratchathewi		Bangkok	161 m	528 ft	41	2023	13.75450°N 100.52896°E	
159	Pyne By Sansiri		Bangkok	160.9 m	528 ft	44	2012	13.75224°N 100.53099°E	
160	Cetus Beachfront Pattaya		Pattaya	160.7 m	527 ft	50	2015	12.87495°N 100.88772°E	
161	Q. House Lumpini		Bangkok	160.5 m	527 ft	38	2006	13.72504°N 100.54399°E	
162 =	The Palm Wongamat Beach Tower A		Pattaya	160 m	520 ft	46	2016	12.96939°N 100.88437°E	
162 =	GMM Grammy Place		Bangkok	160 m	520 ft	43	1999	13.74338°N 100.56250°E	
162 =	Vanit Building II		Bangkok	160 m	520 ft	42	1994	13.74941°N 100.54809°E	
162 =	Interlink Tower (Nation tower)		Bangkok	160 m	520 ft	40	1995	13.66387°N 100.65134°E	
162 =	Bank of Ayudhya Head Office		Bangkok	160 m	520 ft	39	1996	13.67712°N 100.54703°E	
162 =	U Chu Liang Building		Bangkok	160 m	520 ft	40	1998	13.72731°N 100.54050°E	
162 =	Thani Noppharat Building		Bangkok	160 m	520 ft	37	2017	13.77068°N 100.55396°E	Also known as Bangkok City Hall 2.
162 =	Whizdom Inspire Sukhumvit		Bangkok	160 m	520 ft	46	2020	13.68595°N 100.61115°E	Part of the Whizdom 101 complex.
170 =	Nara 9		Bangkok	159 m	522 ft	40	2017	13.71801°N 100.53317°E	
170 =	Cathedral of Learning		Samut Prakan	159 m	522 ft	39	2002	13.61197°N 100.83761°E	Sixth tallest educational building in the world
172 =	The Emporio Place East Tower		Bangkok	158 m	518 ft	42	2009	13.72293°N 100.56731°E	
172 =	Q Langsuan		Bangkok	158 m	518 ft	39	2010	13.73935°N 100.54256°E	
172 =	Grand Langsuan Condominium		Bangkok	158 m	518 ft	36	1998	13.73973°N 100.54265°E	
175	KnightsBridge Prime Onnut		Bangkok	157.6 m	517 ft	47	2020	13.71043°N 100.60221°E	
176	T-One Building		Bangkok	157.5 m	517 ft	29	2019	13.72253°N 100.58044°E	
177	Royce Private Residences Tower A		Bangkok	157.3 m	516 ft	40	2011	13.74057°N 100.56607°E	
178 =	Niche Mono Ramkhamhaeng		Bangkok	157 m	515 ft	47	2023	13.76109°N 100.60221°E	
178 =	Chapter Charoen Nakhon 1		Bangkok	157 m	515 ft	46	2022	13.71424°N 100.50430°E	
178 =	Chamchuri Office Tower		Bangkok	157 m	515 ft	40	2008	13.73290°N 100.53115°E	
178 =	Langsuan Ville		Bangkok	157 m	515 ft	42	1997	13.73989°N 100.54296°E	
182	The Lofts Asoke		Bangkok	156.8 m	514 ft	45	2019	13.74696°N 100.56268°E	
183	Kimpton Maa-Lai Bangkok		Bangkok	156 m	512 ft	42	2019	13.73775°N 100.54344°E	
184	Skyrise Avenue Sukhumvit 64 Tower III		Bangkok	156 m	512 ft	46	2025	13.683619°N 100.607191°E	
185	LAVIQ Sukhumvit 57		Bangkok	155.3 m	510 ft	33	2019	13.72473°N 100.58082°E	
186 =	G Tower		Bangkok	155 m	509 ft	40	2017	13.75721°N 100.56575°E	Also known as Rama IX Square Tower
186 =	Ashton Asok-Rama 9 Alpha Tower		Bangkok	155 m	509 ft	45	2020	13.75561°N 100.56409°E	
186 =	Centric Sea Pattaya Tower A		Pattaya	155 m	509 ft	44	2016	12.93949°N 100.88830°E	
186 =	ICS Tower		Bangkok	155 m	509 ft	34	2022^{[UC]}	13.72633°N 100.50879°E	Hilton Garden Inn hotel, Iconsiam
186 =	Circle Condominium Tower II		Bangkok	155 m	509 ft	43	2011	13.74958°N 100.55585°E	
186 =	333 Riverside B Building		Bangkok	155 m	509 ft	42	2016	13.80735°N 100.51973°E	
186 =	Centric Tiwanon Station Tower I		Nonthaburi	155 m	509 ft	41	2014	13.84090°N 100.51232°E	
186 =	The Zea Sriracha		Chonburi	155 m	509 ft	39	2017	13.19324°N 100.93466°E	
186 =	White Sand Beach Residences		Chonburi	155 m	509 ft	37	2015	12.83316°N 100.90882°E	Also known as Mövenpick Spinnaker Residences.
195	AIA Capital Center		Bangkok	154.9 m	508 ft	34	2014	13.76489°N 100.56820°E	
196	Rosewood Bangkok		Bangkok	154.4 m	507 ft	32	2019	13.74337°N 100.54896°E	
197	C Ekkamai		Bangkok	154.1 m	506 ft	44	2019	13.74022°N 100.58970°E	
198 =	Life Asoke-Rama 9		Bangkok	154 m	505 ft	46	2020	13.75514°N 100.56387°E	
198 =	RHYTHM Sathorn South Building		Bangkok	154 m	505 ft	41	2015	13.71667°N 100.51661°E	
200	WISH Signature Midtown Siam		Bangkok	153.8 m	505 ft	47	2018	13.75202°N 100.53466°E	
201 =	Ideal 24		Bangkok	153 m	502 ft	41	2008	13.72360°N 100.56703°E	
201 =	The Residence Sukhumvit 24 Tower II		Bangkok	153 m	502 ft	41	2008	13.72348°N 100.56608°E	
201 =	Vanissa Building		Bangkok	153 m	502 ft	22	2022	13.74590°N 100.54434°E	
204	Siamese residence Tower C landmark @ MRTA station		Bangkok	152.85 m	501.5 ft	29	2024	13.756298°N 100.583754°E	
205	ANIL Sathorn 12		Bangkok	152.65 m	500.8 ft	42	2022	13.72131°N 100.52588°E	
206	EDGE Sukhumvit 23		Bangkok	152.6 m	501 ft	35	2017	13.73679°N 100.56315°E	
207 =	Villa Rachatewi		Bangkok	152 m	499 ft	43	2010	13.75447°N 100.53269°E	
207 =	Energy Complex Building I		Bangkok	152 m	499 ft	36	2009	13.81959°N 100.55732°E	
207 =	Park Origin Phrom Phong Tower C		Bangkok	152 m	499 ft	42	2018	13.73247°N 100.58456°E	
207 =	Unixx South Pattaya		Pattaya	152 m	499 ft	48	2016	12.918997°N 100.870241°E	
211	The River North Tower		Bangkok	151.8 m	498 ft	45	2012	13.72134°N 100.51017°E	
212 =	Baiyoke Tower I		Bangkok	151 m	495 ft	42	1987	13.75296°N 100.53950°E	Tallest building in Thailand from 1987 to 1993
212 =	The Saint Residences Tower I		Bangkok	151 m	495 ft	41	2018	13.81152°N 100.56058°E	
212 =	The Saint Residences Tower II		Bangkok	151 m	495 ft	41	2018	13.81152°N 100.56058°E	
212 =	The Saint Residences Tower III		Bangkok	151 m	495 ft	41	2018	13.81152°N 100.56058°E	
216 =	The Peninsula Bangkok Hotel		Bangkok	151 m	495 ft	40	1998	13.72318°N 100.51082°E	
217 =	S-Oasis Tower		Bangkok	151 m	495 ft	34	2022	13.80760°N 100.55929°E	
218	The Riviera Wongamat Tower A		Pattaya	150.8 m	495 ft	43	2017	12.96682°N 100.88671°E	
219 =	BTS Visionary Park Tower 1		Bangkok	150.6 m	494 ft	36	2025	13.806614°N 100.557367°E	
219 =	BTS Visionary Park Tower 2		Bangkok	150.6 m	494 ft	36	2025	13.806614°N 100.557367°E	
221 =	Belle Grand Rama 9 Tower 1		Bangkok	150.3 m	493 ft	43	2012	13.75971°N 100.56959°E	
221 =	Belle Grand Rama 9 Tower 2		Bangkok	150.3 m	493 ft	43	2012	13.75971°N 100.56959°E	
223	333 Riverside A Building		Bangkok	150.1 m	492 ft	41	2016	13.80701°N 100.51961°E	
224 =	The Line Jatujak-Mochit		Bangkok	150 m	490 ft	43	2017	13.80596°N 100.55655°E	
224 =	Wind Ratchayothin		Bangkok	150 m	490 ft	37	2010	13.82883°N 100.56608°E	
224 =	The Infinity Sathorn Square		Bangkok	150 m	490 ft	34	2008	13.72314°N 100.52923°E	
224 =	Chapter Charoen Nakhon 2		Bangkok	150 m	490 ft	43	2022	13.71424°N 100.50430°E	
224 =	Noble Around Ari		Bangkok	150 m	490 ft	39	2023	13.778000°N 100.544263°E	
224 =	The Crest Park Residences		Bangkok	150 m	490 ft	36	2022	13.81426°N 100.56083°E	

== Tallest buildings under construction, approved and proposed ==
=== Under construction ===
These are buildings over 150 metres (492 feet) in height under construction as of September 2026.

Under construction	Structurally Topped out	On hold

Rank	Name	Location	Height		Floors	Type	Completion	Status
Rank	Name	Location	m	ft	Floors	Type	Completion	Status
1	One Bangkok Signature Tower	Pathum Wan	437 m	1,434 ft	92	Mixed-use	2030	On hold
2	Soonthareeya Ratchadamri	Pathum Wan	295.2 m	969 ft	64	Residential	TBA	On hold
3	Witthayu Condominium Tower 2	Pathum Wan	284 m	932 ft	71	Residential	2029	Under construction
4	Central Embassy extension	Pathum Wan	234.8 m	770 ft	56	Mixed-use	2030	Under Construction
5	Tenth Avenue	Khlong Toei	233 m	764 ft	54	Mixed-use	TBA	On hold
7	Bangkok Mall Tower	Bang Na	219 m	719 ft	42	Mixed-use	2028	Under construction
8	Witthayu Condominium Tower 1	Pathum Wan	218 m	715 ft	52	Residential	2029	Under construction
9	Grand Solaire Pattaya	Pattaya	213 m	699 ft	67	Residential	2026	Under construction
10	BDMS Silver Wellness City	Pathum Wan	208.2 m	683 ft	46	Mixed-use	2030	Under construction
11	Wanvayla Na Chaophraya	Dusit	205 m	673 ft	52	Residential	2026	Topped Out
12	Central Siam Square	Pathum Wan	189.6 m	622 ft	42	Mixed-Use	2030	Under Construction
13	CU Block 33 Tower A	Pathum Wan	184.10 m	604.0 ft	50	Residential	TBA	Under construction
14	Aquarious Pattaya Tower 1	Pattaya	178.90 m	586.9 ft	47	Residential	2027	Under construction
15	The Platinum Square	Ratchathewi	176 m	577 ft	48	Mixed-use	2028	Under construction
16	SC Residences (Tentative Name)	Bang Rak	173.4 m	569 ft	37	Residential	TBA	Under construction
17	Solace Condo Phahol Pradipat	Phaya Thai	166 m	545 ft	50	Residential	2027	Under construction
18	Aquarious Pattaya Tower 2	Pattaya	165 m	541 ft	44	Residential	2027	Under construction
19	CU Block 33 Tower B	Pathum Wan	160.90 m	527.9 ft	43	Residential	TBA	Under construction

=== Approved and proposed ===
List of proposed major buildings that will rise more than 150 metres, including those projects that received environmental approvals, cancelled or never built.

Approved	Proposed	Cancelled

Rank	Name	Location	Height		Floors	Type	Completion	Status
Rank	Name	Location	m	ft	Floors	Type	Completion	Status
1	Rama IX Super Tower	Huai Khwang	615 m	2,018 ft	125	Mixed-use	__	Cancelled,
2	Makkasan Complex	Huai Khwang	550 m	1,800 ft	120	Mixed-use	TBA	Proposed, under planning
3	Asiatique Iconic Tower	Bang Ko Laem	450 m	1,480 ft	100	Mixed-use	2030	Approved
4	Chao Phraya Gateway	Khlong Toei	400 m	1,300 ft	110	Mixed-use	TBA	Proposed
5	Six Senses Bangkok & Six Senses Residences Bangkok	Watthana	395.75 m	1,298.4 ft	68	Mixed-use	__	Cancelled
6	Metropolis International	Khlong Toei	359 m	1,178 ft	104	Office	—	Cancelled
7	Hyde Riverbay Charoen Nakhon	Bang Ko Laem	290 m	950 ft	67	Residential	TBA	Proposed, under planning
8	Residences at Rajadamri	Pathum Wan	286 m	938 ft	53	Proposed	TBA	Proposed
9	VK Golden Bay Tower 1	Pattaya	280 m	920 ft	69	Residential	TBA	Proposed
10	The Parq Phase 3 Office Tower	Khlong Toei	268 m	879 ft	—	Residential	TBA	Proposed
11	Treasure Island Tower I	Yan Nawa	266 m	873 ft	—	Residential	TBA	Proposed
12	Treasure Island Tower II	Yan Nawa	249 m	817 ft	—	Residential	TBA	Proposed
13	Once Wongamat	Pattaya	239 m	784 ft	56	Residential	TBA	Approved
14	Treasure Island Tower III	Yan Nawa	232 m	761 ft	—	Residential	TBA	Proposed
15	Treasure Island Tower IV	Yan Nawa	232 m	761 ft	—	Residential	TBA	Proposed
16	Lucean Tower 1	Pattaya	218.50 m	716.9 ft	60	Residential	TBA	Approved
17	Lucean Tower 2	Pattaya	216.70 m	711.0 ft	60	Residential	TBA	Approved
18	Platinum Bay Tower 1	Pattaya	215 m	705 ft	—	Residential	TBA	Proposed
19	Ivy Sukhumvit 18	Watthana	212 m	696 ft	—	Residential	TBA	Proposed
20	Grand Solaire Noble	Pattaya	200 m	660 ft	50	Residential	TBA	Approved
21	Aquatic District, JW Marriott	Pattaya	200 m	660 ft	—	Mixed-use	TBA	Proposed
22	VK Golden Bay Tower 2	Pattaya	196 m	643 ft	54	Residential	TBA	Proposed
23	Coba Cobana Coral Reef	Pattaya	194 m	636 ft	55	Residential	TBA	Approved
24	Marina Golden Bay	Pattaya	163.75 m	537.2 ft	51	Residential	TBA	Approved

== Timeline of tallest buildings ==
This lists buildings that once held the title of tallest structure in Thailand.

Name	Image	Location	Years as tallest	Height		Floors	Notes
Magnolias Waterfront Residences		Khlong San	2018–present	318	1037 ft	70	
King Power MahaNakhon		Bang Rak	2016–2018	314 m	1,030 ft	78	
Baiyoke Tower II		Ratchathewi	1997–2016	304 m	997 ft	85	
Jewelry Trade Center		Bang Rak	1996–1997	221 m	725 ft	56	
Kasikorn Bank Head Office		Rat Burana	1995–1996	207.6 m	681 ft	42	
Sinn Sathorn Tower		Khlong San	1993–1995	195 m	640 ft	43	
Baiyoke Tower I		Ratchathewi	1987–1993	151 m	495 ft	43	
Bangkok Bank Building		Bang Rak	1981–1987	134 m	440 ft	33	
Chokchai International Building		Watthana	1978–1981	–	–	26	Demolished in 2017
Dusit Thani Bangkok		Bang Rak	1968–1978	82 m	269 ft	23	Demolished in 2020. Site to be redeveloped as part of Dusit Central Park Project.
A.I.A Tower		Bang Rak	1964–1968	–	–	11	

== Tallest buildings by function ==
This list categorizes the tallest buildings by their primary functions.

Function	Name	Location	Height		Floors	Completion
Residential	Magnolias Waterfront Residences Iconsiam	Khlong San	316 m	1,037 ft	70	2018
Mixed-use	King Power MahaNakhon	Bang Rak	314 m	1,030 ft	79	2016
Hotel	Baiyoke Tower II	Ratchathewi	304 m	997 ft	85	1997
Office	One City Centre	Pathum Wan	276 m	906 ft	61	2023
Education	Cathedral of Learning	Bang Sao Thong	159 m	522 ft	39	2002
Hospital	Bhumisiri Mangkhalanusorn Building	Pathum Wan	142 m	466 ft	29	2013
Government building	Sappaya-Sapasathan	Dusit	134.56 m	441.5 ft	11	2021

== Tallest buildings by city ==
This is a list of the tallest buildings in each city, with heights greater than 100 metres (330 ft).

City	Name	Image	Year	Height		Floors	Reference
Bangkok	Magnolias Waterfront Residences		2018	315 m	1,033 ft	70	
Pattaya	Reflection Jomtien Beach Oceanfront Tower		2013	234 m	768 ft	57	
Nonthaburi	The Politan Aqua West Tower		2020	214.3 m	703 ft	61	
Samut Prakan	Whizdom The Forestias Destinia Tower		2024	193 m	633 ft	50	
Hat Yai	Napalai Place		1999	192 m	630 ft	46	
Si Racha	Oakwood Hotel & Residence Sri Racha		2017	167 m	548 ft	44	
Khon Kaen	The Houze Condominium		2016	137 m	449 ft	37	
Chiang Mai	Supalai Monte @Wiang Chiang Mai		2016	111 m	364 ft	32	
Chiang Mai	Supalai Monte 2		2018	111 m	364 ft	32	
Chiang Mai	The Base Height Chiang Mai		2024	108 m	354 ft	31	
Nakhon Ratchasima	Plus Condo Korat		2021	100.70 m	330.4 ft	30	

== Tallest completed structures ==
This is a list of the tallest structures in Thailand, based on their height from the base to the highest point. The list includes towers, transmission towers, bridges, chedis, temples, dams, and other structures but does not include buildings. This list is incomplete and possibly inaccurate.

Rank	Name	Image	Location	Height		Type	Year	Notes
Rank	Name	Image	Location	m	ft	Type	Year	Notes
1	Pattaya Park Tower		Pattaya	240 m	790 ft	Observation tower	1995	
2	TV5 Tower			225 m	738 ft	Lattice Tower		
3	Kanchanaphisek Bridge		Phra Pradaeng	187.6 m	615 ft	Bridge	2007	
4	Samut Prakan Observation Tower		Samut Prakan	179.6 m	589 ft	Observation tower	2018	
5	Bhumibol Bridge		Samut Prakan	173 m	568 ft	Bridge	2006	
6	Rama VIII Bridge		Bang Phlat/Phra Nakhon	160 m	520 ft	Bridge	2002	
7	Bhumibol Dam		Sam Ngao	154 m	505 ft	Dam	1964	
8	Sarahnlom Wind Turbines		Dan Khun Thot	153 m	502 ft	Wind turbine	2018	
9	Srinagarind Dam		Si Sawat	140 m	460 ft	Dam	1980	
20	Mittraphap Wind Turbines		Sikhiu	137 m	449 ft	Wind turbine	2018	
11	Sappaya-Sapasathan		Dusit	134.56 m	441.5 ft	Government building	2021	
12	Suvarnabhumi Airport; Air Traffic Control Tower		Bang Phli	132.2 m	434 ft	Air traffic control tower	2006	
13=	Wayu Wind Turbines		Dan Khun Thot	125 m	410 ft	Wind turbine	2016	
13=	Subplu Wind Turbines		Dan Khun Thot	125 m	410 ft	Wind turbine	2016	
15	Banharn-Jamsai Tower		Suphan Buri	123.25 m	404.4 ft	Observation Tower	1994	
16	Phra Pathommachedi		Nakhon Pathom	120.45 m	395.2 ft	Chedi	1870	
17	Sirikit Dam		Tha Pla	113.60 m	372.7 ft	Dam	1974	
18	Terminal 21 Korat Tower		Nakhon Ratchasima	110 m	360 ft	Observation tower	2016	
19	Sanctuary of Truth		Pattaya	105 m	344 ft	Temple	-	
20=	Roi Et Observation Tower		Roi Et	101 m	331 ft	Observation tower	2020	
20=	Phra Maha Chedi Chai Mongkol		Roi Et	101 m	331 ft	Chedi	1985	
22=	Wat Dhammamongkol		Phra Khanong	95 m	312 ft	Temple	1985	
22=	Master Nun Chand Kho Nokyoong; Centennial Building		Khlong Luang	95 m	312 ft	Temple	2016	
24	Rajjaprabha Dam		Ban Ta Khun	94 m	308 ft	Dam	1987	
25	Vajiralongkorn Dam		Thong Pha Phum	92 m	302 ft	Dam	1984	
26	Chedi Phu Khao Thong		Ayutthaya	90 m	300 ft	Chedi	–	
27	Rama IX Bridge		Yan Nawa/Rat Burana	87 m	285 ft	Bridge	1987	
28	Bang Lang Dam		Bannang Sata	85 m	279 ft	Dam	1981	
29	Srilamduan Honor Tower		Sisaket	84 m	276 ft	Observation tower	2016	
30	Suranapa Tower		Nakhon Ratchasima	82 m	269 ft	Observation tower	1993	
31	Wat Arun		Thonburi	81.85 m	268.5 ft	Prang	1851	
32	Wat Samphran		Samphran	80 m	260 ft	Temple	1985	
33	Chulabhorn Dam		Khon San	70 m	230 ft	Dam	1972	
34	Mitsubishi Elevator Asia Test Tower		Chonburi	68 m	223 ft	Elevator testing tower	2017	
35	Ho Kaeo Mukdahan		Mukdahan	65 m	213 ft	Observation tower	1996	
35=	Asiatique Wheel		Bang Kho Laem	60 m	200 ft	Ferris wheel	2012	
35=	Wat Yai Chai Mongkol		Ayutthaya	60 m	200 ft	Chedi	–	
37=	Golden Mount		Pom Prap Sattru Phai	59 m	194 ft	Temple	1865	
37=	Mae Ngat Somboon Chon Dam		Mae Taeng	59 m	194 ft	Dam	1986	
39	Kaeng Krachan Dam		Kaeng Krachan	58 m	190 ft	Dam	1966	
40	Victory Monument		Ratchathewi	50 m	160 ft	Monument	1942	
41	Ananta Samakhom Throne Hall		Dusit	48 m	157 ft	Throne hall	1915	
42	Wat Phra That Phanom		That Phanom	47 m	154 ft	Chedi	1979	
43	Sirindhorn Dam		Sirindhorn	42 m	138 ft	Dam	1971	
44	Nam Phung Dam		Kut Bak	41 m	135 ft	Dam	1965	
45	Lam Takhong Dam		Pak Chong; Sikhiu	40.3 m	132 ft	Dam	1974	
46	Santorini Park Wheel		Cha-am	40 m	130 ft	Ferris wheel	2012	
47	Ubol Ratana Dam		Ubolratana	32 m	105 ft	Dam	1966	
48	Tha Thung Na Dam		Kanchanaburi	30 m	98 ft	Dam	1981	

== Tallest structures under construction or proposed ==
This list provides information about the tallest structures currently under construction, on hold, cancelled, proposed, or approved. Buildings are not included. The list is not exhaustive and contributions are welcome to expand it, with appropriate citations to reliable sources.

Rank	Name	Location	Height		Type	Year	Status
Rank	Name	Location	m	ft	Type	Year	Status
1	Bangkok Observation Tower	Khlong San	459 m	1,506 ft	Observation tower	–	Cancelled

== Tallest statues ==
This list includes large statues and sculptural monuments in Thailand. Reported heights are not always measured consistently: some exclude pedestals, while others include a pedestal or supporting structure. Statues of equal reported height share a rank.

Rank	Name	Image	Depiction	Location	Province	Height		Year	Notes
Rank	Name	Image	Depiction	Location	Province	m	ft	Year	Notes
1	Great Buddha of Ang Thong		Buddha (Gautama)	Wat Muang	Ang Thong	95 m	312 ft	2007	
2	Phra Phuttha Chok (Great Buddha of Lopburi)		Buddha (Gautama)	Wat Khao Wong Phrachan	Lopburi	75 m	246 ft	2018	
3	Great Guanyin of Chiang Rai		Guanyin	Wat Huay Pla Kang	Chiang Rai	69 m	226 ft	2016	
3	Phra Buddha Dhammakaya Thepmongkhon (Great Buddha of Bangkok)		Buddha (Gautama)	Wat Paknam Bhasicharoen	Bangkok	69 m	226 ft	2021	
5	Phra Phuttha Ming Mongkhon Muni Si Mukdahan		Buddha (Gautama)	Wat Roi Phra Phutthabat Phu Manorom	Mukdahan	59.99 m	196.8 ft	2011	
6	Phra Phuttha Rattana Mongkhon Maha Muni (Great Buddha of Roi Et)		Buddha (Gautama)	Wat Burapha Phiram	Roi Et	59.2 m	194 ft	1979	
7	Luang Pu Thuat (Khao Yai)		Luang Pu Thuat	Luang Pu Thuat Buddhist Park, Pak Chong	Nakhon Ratchasima	59 m	194 ft	2018	
8	Phra Kakusandha		Buddha (Kakusandha)	Wat Phai Rong Wua	Suphan Buri	58 m	190 ft	1980	
9	Great First Sermon Buddha (Wat Tham Khao Prang)		Buddha (Gautama)	Wat Tham Khao Prang	Lopburi	56 m	184 ft	2014	
10	Luang Pu Thuat (Phuttha Utthayan Maharat)		Luang Pu Thuat	Phuttha Utthayan Maharat, Maha Rat	Phra Nakhon Si Ayutthaya	51 m	167 ft	2013	
11	Seated Ganesha of Wat Phrong Akat		Ganesha	Wat Phrong Akat	Chachoengsao	49 m	161 ft	2015	
12	Phra Phuttha Praphat Nimit Muninthon		Buddha (Gautama)	Wat Sap Bon	Saraburi	45 m	148 ft	1985	
12	Phra Phuttha Ming Mongkhon Eknakkhiri (Phuket Big Buddha)		Buddha (Gautama)	Wat Kittisangkaram	Phuket	45 m	148 ft	2014	
12	Five Seated Buddhas of Wat Pha Sorn Kaew		Buddha (Gautama)	Wat Pha Sorn Kaew	Phetchabun	45 m	148 ft	2014	
12	Phra Phuttha Sakon Sima Mongkhon (Luang Pho Khao)		Buddha (Gautama)	Wat Thep Phithak Punnaram	Nakhon Ratchasima	45 m	148 ft	1969	
12	Phra Phuttha Metta (Somdet Ong Pathom)		Buddha (Gautama)	Wat Thep Prathan (Athiphon), Soi Dao	Chanthaburi	45 m	148 ft	2023	
17	Three-headed Erawan Elephant		Erawan	Erawan Museum	Samut Prakan	43.6 m	143 ft	2003	
18	Great Bronze Ganesha of Chachoengsao		Ganesha	Ganesha International Park, Khlong Khuean	Chachoengsao	39 m	128 ft	2012	
19	Phra Maha Sakyamuni Si Sanphet		Buddha (Gautama)	Wat Phra Phutthabat Doi Lon	Tak	38 m	125 ft	2014	
20	Luang Pho Sothon (Wat Bot)		Buddha (Gautama)	Wat Bot, Sam Khok	Pathum Thani	37 m	121 ft	2014	
21	Phra Phuttha Butsaya Khiri Si Suvarnabhumi (Luang Pho Uthong)		Buddha (Gautama)	Wat Khao Tham Thiam	Suphan Buri	35 m	115 ft	2019	
22	Luang Pu Thuat (Wat Don Sak)		Luang Pu Thuat	Wat Don Sak (Wat Singkhon)	Surat Thani	34.9 m	115 ft	2022	
23	Phra Phuttha Si Ariya Maitreya		Buddha (Maitreya)	Wat Intharawihan	Bangkok	32 m	105 ft	1924	
23	Phra Phuttha Maha Metta Pracha Thai Trailokkanat Khantharat Anuson		Buddha (Gautama)	Wat Thip Sukontharam	Kanchanaburi	32 m	105 ft	2015	
23	Phra Phuttha Lokachet Wiset Kitti Pal Maha Chon Buchit		Buddha (Gautama)	Wat Bang Ping	Samut Prakan	32 m	105 ft	2019	
26	Phra Phuttha Chaloem Siri Rat		Buddha (Gautama)	Wat Si Don Chai, Ban Thi	Lamphun	29.5 m	97 ft	1993	
27	Luang Pho Yai Prathan Phon		Buddha (Gautama)	Wat Huai Nam Sap (Wat Phra That Wayo)	Chachoengsao	29 m	95 ft	1994	
28	Luang Pho To of Wat Bot		Somdej Toh	Wat Bot, Sam Khok	Pathum Thani	28 m	92 ft	2008	
28	Child-bestowing Guanyin of Wat Saman Rattanaram		Guanyin	Wat Saman Rattanaram	Chachoengsao	28 m	92 ft	2012	
30	Phra Phuttha Metta Maha Lap		Buddha (Gautama)	Wat Phai Lom, Bang Ban	Phra Nakhon Si Ayutthaya	25 m	82 ft	2018	

=== Under construction or proposed ===
The following table lists major statue projects in Thailand that are under construction or have been proposed. The projects are arranged by their announced planned heights. These figures do not represent the verified heights of completed statues and may include pedestals or other supporting structures.

Project	Depiction	Location	Province	Planned height		Status and references
Project	Depiction	Location	Province	m	ft	Status and references
Phra Nang Mueang (Seated Buddha)	Gautama	Wat Phuttha Wanaram (Wat Pa Wang Nam Yen)	Maha Sarakham	168 m	551 ft	Foundation-stone ceremony held on 12 November 2023. Completion has not been verified.
Standing Buddha at Ubon Ratchathani Buddhist Park	Gautama	Phutthamonthon Ubon Ratchathani, Khueang Nai	Ubon Ratchathani	137 m	449 ft	Proposed in March 2024. A project-development meeting was held in October 2026. The planned overall height is 137 m, including the supporting structure; the Buddha figure itself is planned to stand 95 m tall.
Guanyin of Sakom (Thepha)	Guanyin	Sakom, Thepha	Songkhla	136 m	446 ft	Construction was reported in 2024. Work was temporarily halted following attacks at the construction site in November 2024. Subsequent progress has not been verified.
King Naresuan the Great Monument	Naresuan	Lan Itsaraphap 109, Pa Mok	Ang Thong	109 m	358 ft	Foundation stone laid in April 2022. A bronze-casting ceremony was reported in December 2024. Completion has not been verified.
Phra Phuttha Metta, Wat Thap Khlo	Gautama	Wat Thap Khlo (Suan Phra Phothisat)	Phichit	80 m	260 ft	Described by the local government as under construction in June 2025. Subsequent completion has not been verified.

== See also ==
- List of tallest buildings in Bangkok
- List of tallest buildings in Asia
- List of tallest buildings in the world
