= Sinn Sathorn Tower =

- สินสาธร ทาวเวอร์
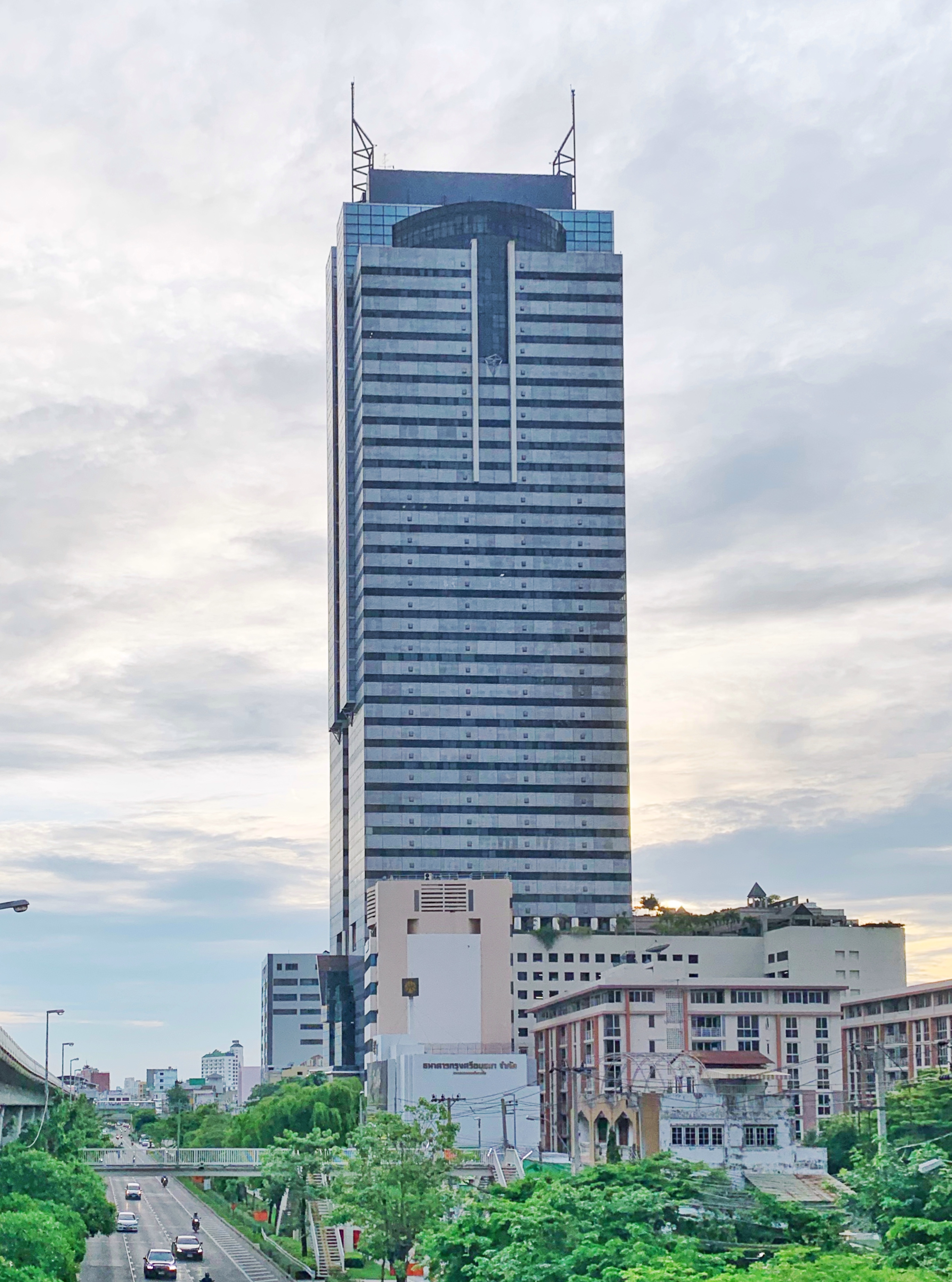
- Sinn Sathorn Tower in 2019

Record height
- Tallest in Thailand from 1993 to 1996^{[I]}
- Surpassed by: The River

General information
- Type: Commercial offices
- Architectural style: Postmodern
- Location: Khlong San District; Bangkok, Thailand
- Coordinates: 13°43′19.86″N 100°29′58.28″E
- Construction started: 1989
- Completed: 1993
- Cost: 2000 million baht (US$58 million)
- Owner: Sinn Estate Property Co., Ltd.
- Operator: Sinn Estate Property Co., Ltd.

Height
- Architectural: 195 metres (640 ft)
- Tip: 195 metres (640 ft)
- Roof: 195 metres (640 ft)

Technical details
- Floor count: 44

References
- Sinn Sathorn Tower

Sinn Sathorn Tower (Thai: สินสาธร ทาวเวอร์) is a skyscraper in Thonburi side, Bangkok. The total height of 195 metres (640 ft) is 44 floors, located at 77/8 Krung Thon Buri Road, Khlong Ton Sai Subdistrict, Khlong San District near the foot of Taksin Bridge, with total area of 120,000 square meters. Construction started in 1989. Completed in 1993, there were 255 units, each with a living area of 170. The square meter is 352 square meters, the cost is 2,000 million baht by Sinn Estate Property Co., Ltd. together with many other companies. It was once the tallest building in Thailand, and the tallest on the Thonburi side, until taken over by The River in 2011.

Today, Sinn Sathorn Tower is the 34th tallest building in Thailand. It was opened as a rental building. The location of the commercial offices, in 1997 was used as a filming location for the James Bond series, Tomorrow Never Dies by assuming the head office of Elliot Carver (Jonathan Pryce) in Saigon, Vietnam, where James Bond (Pierce Brosnan) jumped from the top of the building, along with Wai Lin (Michelle Yeoh) by the handcuffs. This is another highlight scene in the film.

== Nearby places ==
- Krung Thonburi BTS Station
- Wongwian Yai station
- Taksin Bridge (Sathon Bridge)

== See also ==
- List of tallest buildings in Thailand

Records
Preceded by Baiyoke Tower I	Tallest building in Thailand; 195.1 m (640 ft); 1993–1996	Succeeded by Jewelry Trade Center
