= Jewelry Trade Center =

Building in Bangkok, Thailand

Coordinates: 13°43′22″N 100°31′12″E

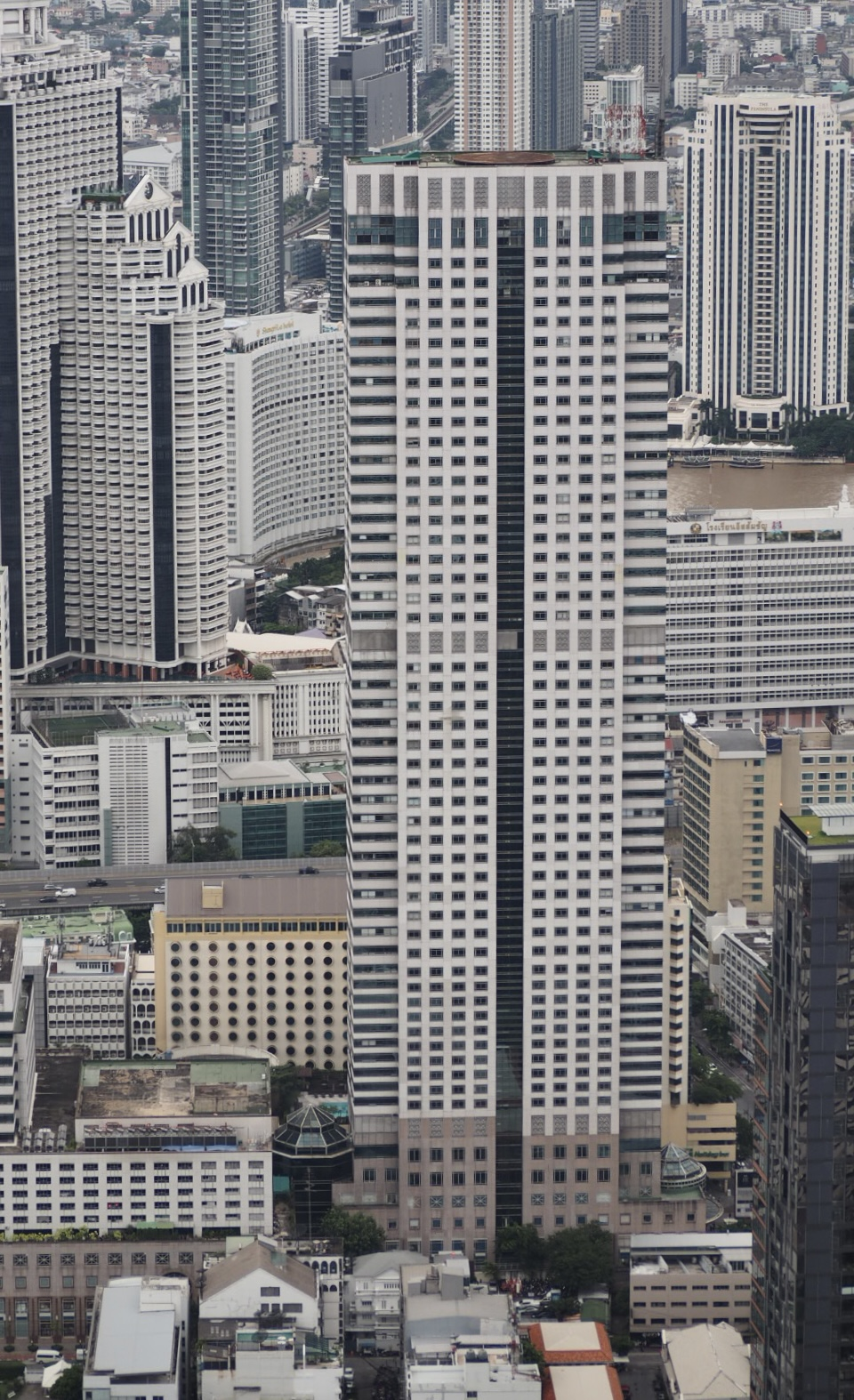
- Jewelry Trade Center in 2022

General information
- Location: 919/1 Silom Road, Bang Rak, Bangkok 10500, Thailand
- Completed: 1996

Height
- Height: 220.7 m (724 ft)

Technical details
- Floor count: 58

Design and construction
- Architect: Hellmuth, Obata and Kassabaum

The Jewelry Trade Center is a 59-story mixed-use skyscraper located in the Silom Road gemstone district of Bangkok, Thailand. Designed by Hellmuth, Obata and Kassabaum, the building was completed in 1996. At 220.7 metres (724 ft) it is currently the eighth-tallest building in Thailand. It was the tallest building in Thailand when it was completed.

The center is the largest center for selling, sourcing and distributing jewelry in Bangkok and one of the largest such centers in Asia. It contains a fully equipped gem-testing laboratory operated by the Asian Institute of Gemological Sciences (AIGS) as well as a gemological school, also operated by AIGS. The Bangkok Fashion Mall located in the building's lower plaza is a large retail space for outlet stores featuring clothing, shoes and accessories. Suppliers of loose gemstones, rough stones and jewelry from around the world are also in the retail areas of the building. The building contains banks, a food court, coffee shops, a convenience store, a health club, a post office, a customs office, and residential condominiums.

The center is built on a plot of land of 9.5 rai, or approximately 4.5 acres (18,000 m^{2}). Partners in the project included Henry Ho (of Bijoux Holdings), Samrit Chirathivat (late CEO of the Central Group, later replaced by Vanchai Chirathivat), Vichai Maleenont (of Bangkok Entertainment, operator of TV Channel 3), and Chatri Sophonpanich (CEO of Bangkok Bank).

== See also ==
- List of tallest buildings in Thailand
- List of tallest buildings in Bangkok

Records
| Preceded by Sinn Sathorn Tower | Tallest building in Thailand; 220.7 m (724 ft); 1996–1997 | Succeeded by Baiyoke Tower II |
