= Baiyoke Tower II =

Hotel skyscraper in Bangkok, Thailand

- Baiyoke Tower II in 2026

General information
- Status: Completed
- Type: Hotel, TV Tower
- Location: 222 Ratchaprarop Road, Ratchathewi; Bangkok, Thailand
- Coordinates: 13.754167°N 100.540556°E
- Construction started: 1990
- Completed: 1997
- Cost: ฿3.6 billion
- Owner: Land Development Co. Ltd.

Height
- Architectural: 309 m (1,014 ft)
- Tip: 328.4 m (1,077 ft)

Technical details
- Floor count: 88
- Floor area: 179,400 m^{2} (1,931,000 sq ft)

Design and construction
- Architect: Plan Architects
- Developer: Land Development Corporation
- Structural engineer: Arun Chaiseri Group
- Main contractor: Concrete Constructions

Other information
- Number of rooms: 673

Website
- www.baiyokehotel.com

Baiyoke Tower II (Thai: อาคารใบหยก 2, RTGS: Akhan Baiyok Song, pronounced [ʔāː.kʰāːn bāj.jòk sɔ̌ːŋ]) is an 88-story, 309 m (1,014 ft) skyscraper hotel at 222 Ratchaprarop Road in the Ratchathewi District of Bangkok, Thailand. It is the third tallest completed building in the city, after MahaNakhon and Magnolias Waterfront Residences at ICONSIAM. The building comprises the Baiyoke Sky Hotel, the tallest hotel in Southeast Asia and the seventh-tallest hotel in the world.

With the antenna included, the building's height is 328.4 m (1,077 ft), and features a public observatory on the 77th floor, a bar called "Roof Top Bar & Music Lounge" on the 83rd floor, a 360-degree revolving roof deck on the 84th floor (309 m) and the hotel offers 673 guest rooms. Construction on the building ended in 1997, with the antenna being added two years later. The Baiyoke Sky Hotel website notes the height without the antenna as 309 m (1,014 ft), while other sources note it as 304 m (997 ft).

== Channels listed by frequency ==
=== Digital television (DVB-T2) ===
Station (MUX)	Channel	Frequency	Power Output/ERP
MUX1	26	MHz	100 kW ERP
MUX2	36	MHz	100 kW ERP
MUX3	40	MHz	100 kW ERP
MUX4	44	MHz	100 kW ERP
MUX5	32 (59)	MHz	100 kW ERP
MUX6	29	MHz	100 kW ERP

=== Analogue television ===
In Bangkok and its vicinity, analog TV broadcasting from the Baiyoke Tower II has been shut down on June 16, 2018, at midnight (Thai PBS), July 16, 2018 at 6:30 PM (MCOT HD), and midnight (NBT) and March 26, 2020, at midnight (Channel 3 HD).

Station	Channel	Frequency	Power Output/ERP
Channel 5 HD	5	MHz	20 kW/400 kW ERP
Channel 7	7	MHz	20 kW/377 kW ERP
MCOT HD	9	MHz	20 kW/400 kW ERP
NBT	11	MHz	20 kW/468 kW ERP
Thai PBS	29	MHz	30 kW/1000 kW ERP
Channel 3 HD	32	MHz	20 kW/340 kW ERP

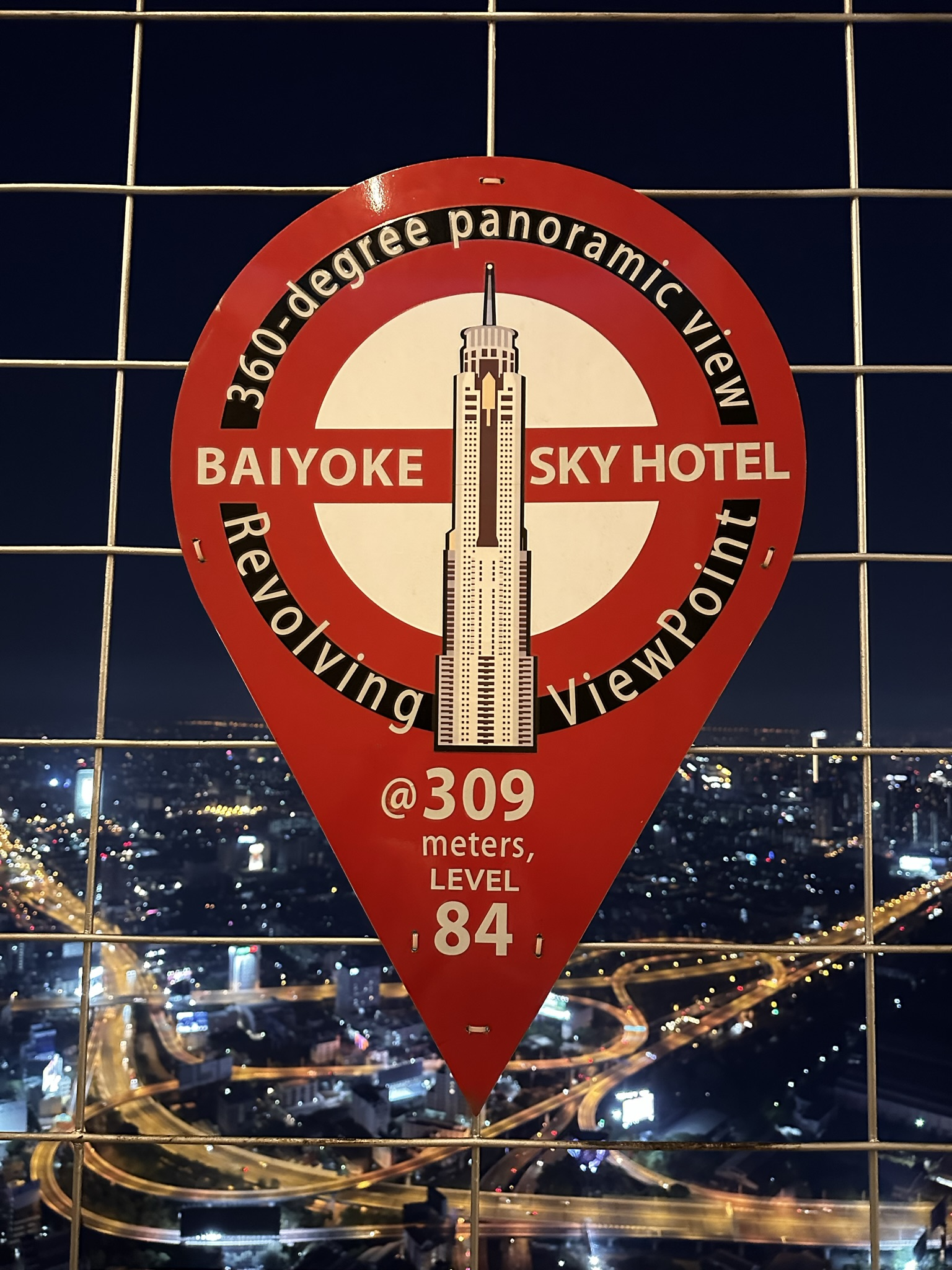

== Gallery ==
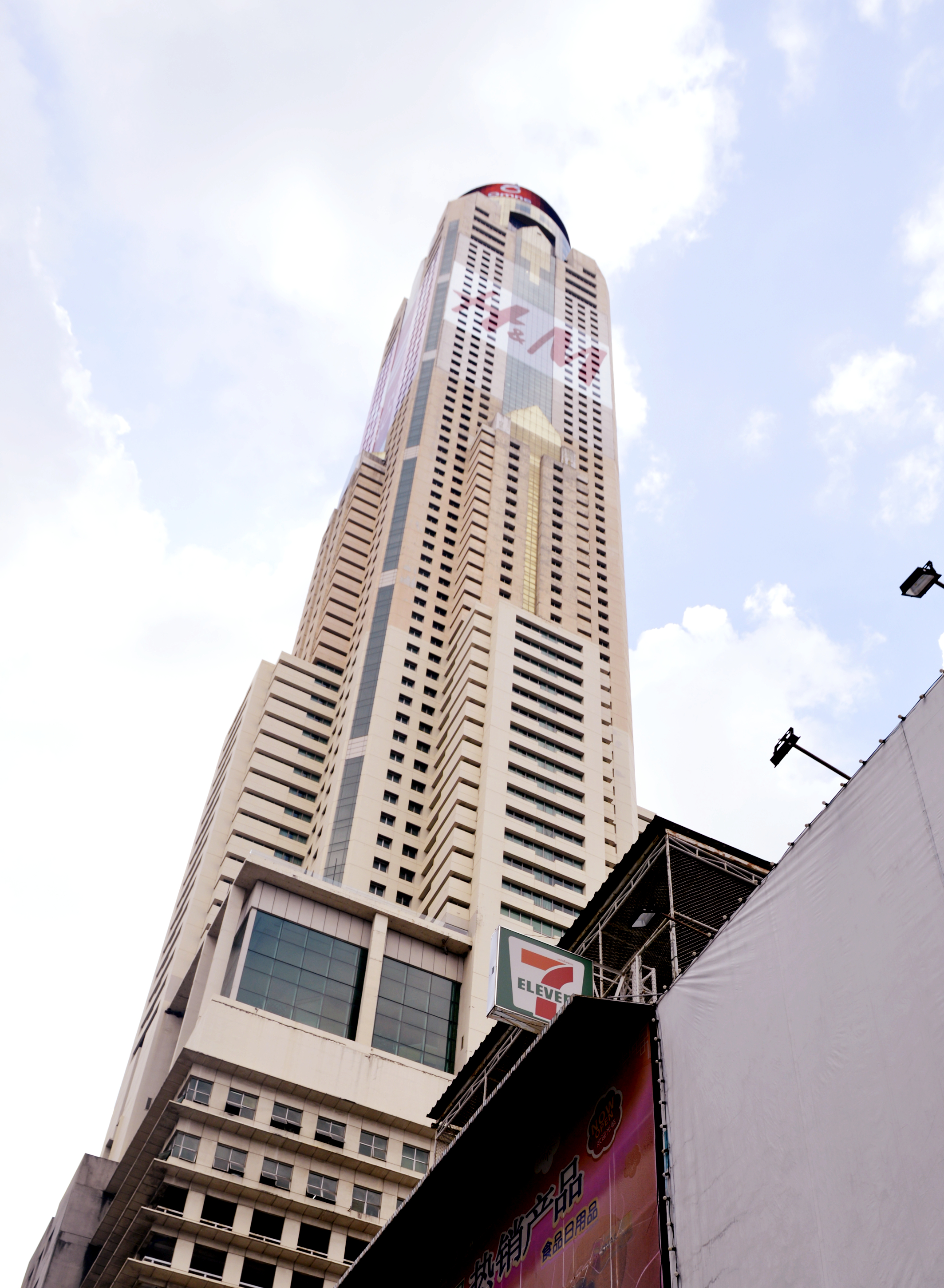
Baiyoke Sky Hotel from Pratunam Market.

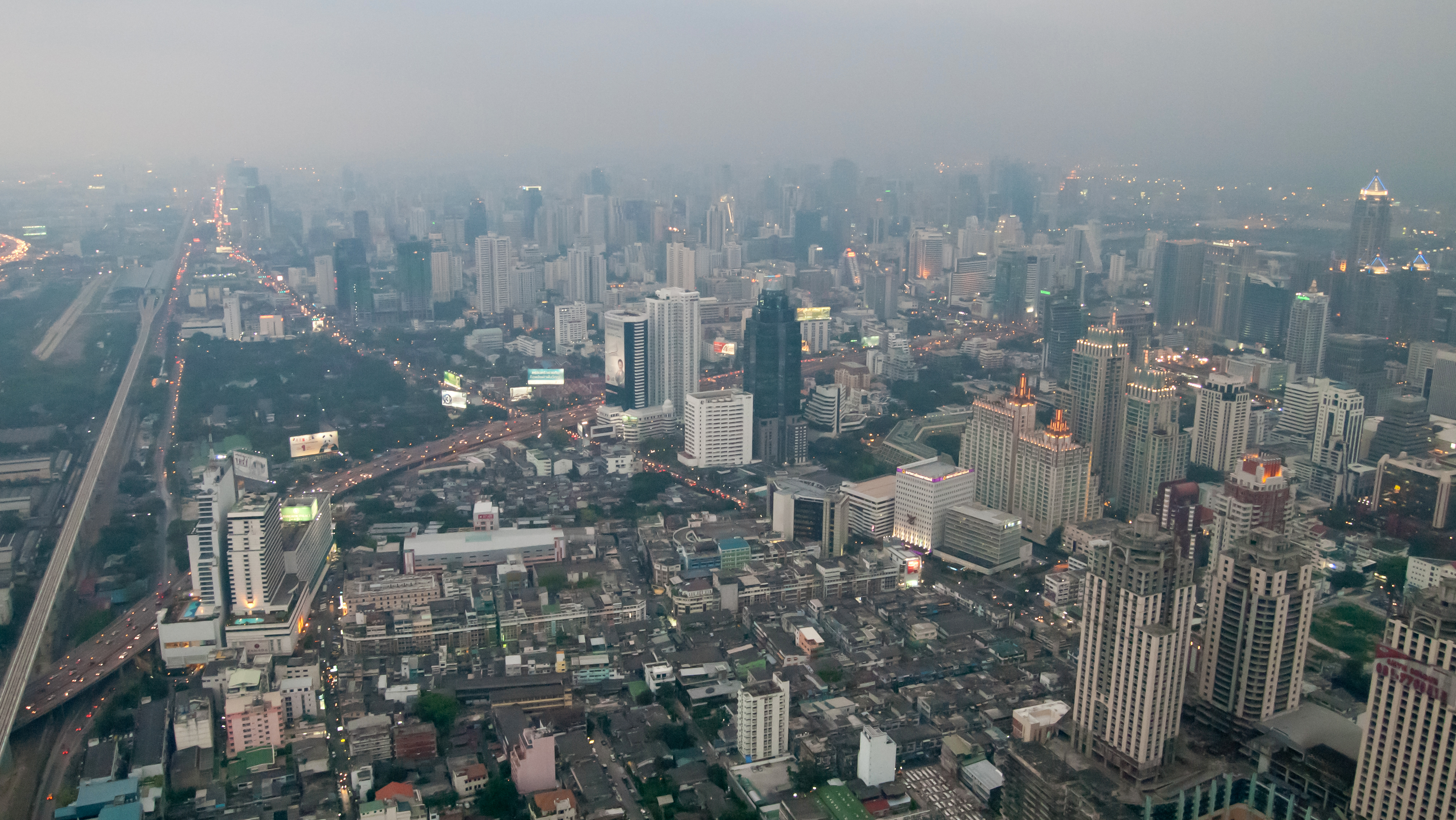
City panorama at dusk, observation platform.

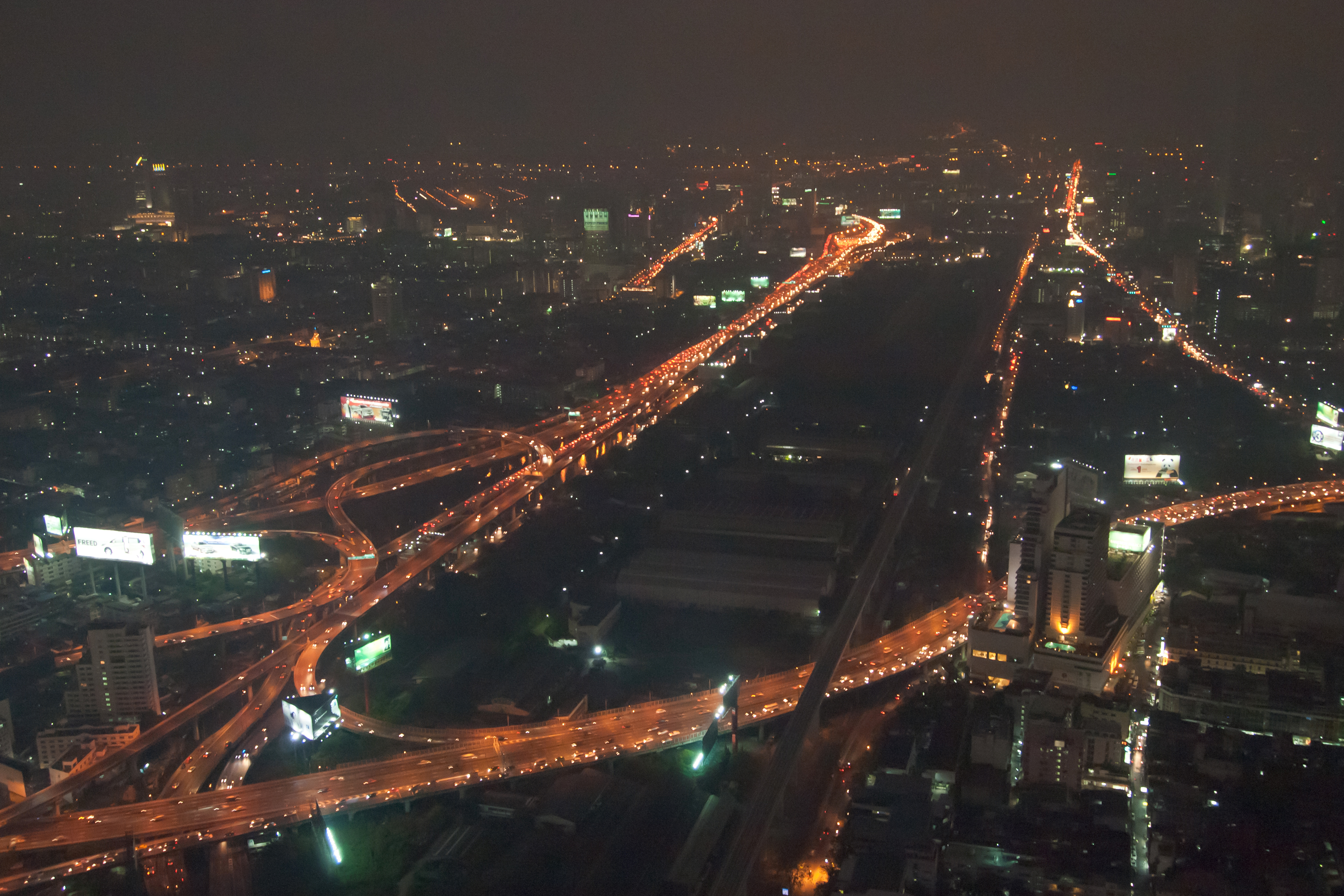
View at night, observation platform.

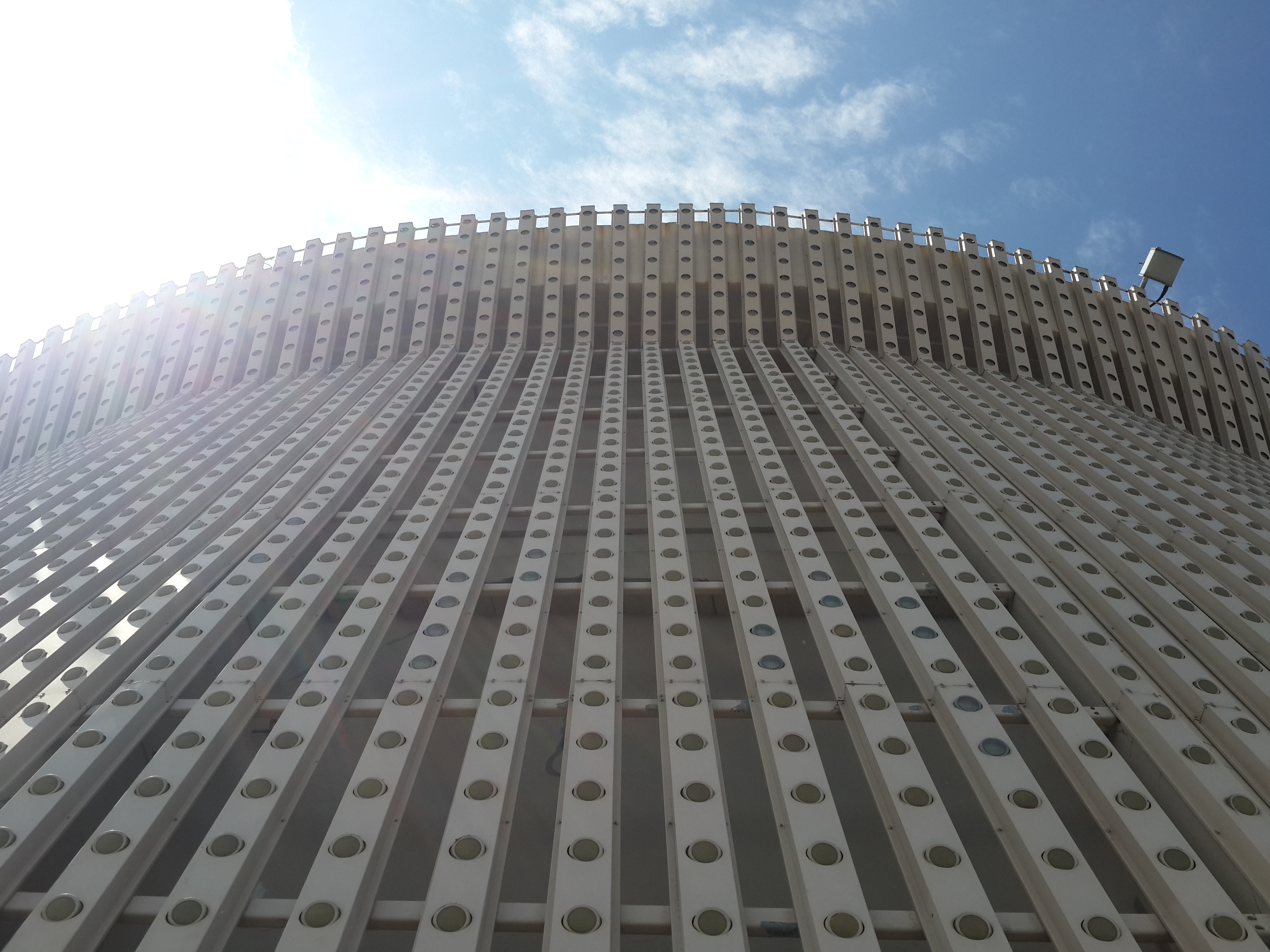
Looking up at the top of the building from the 360-degree revolving roof deck on the 84th floor.

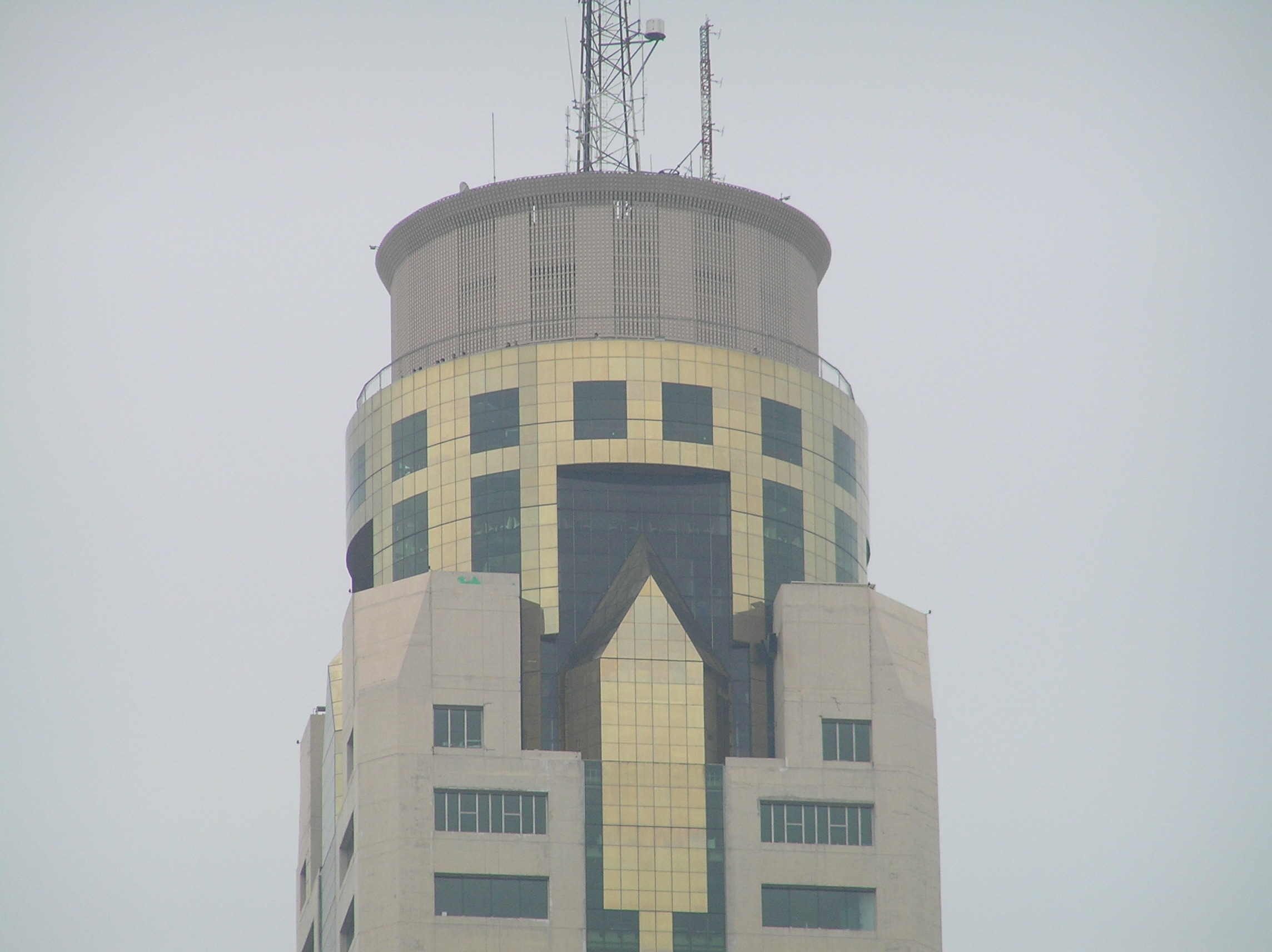
The observation platform of the Baiyoke II tower.

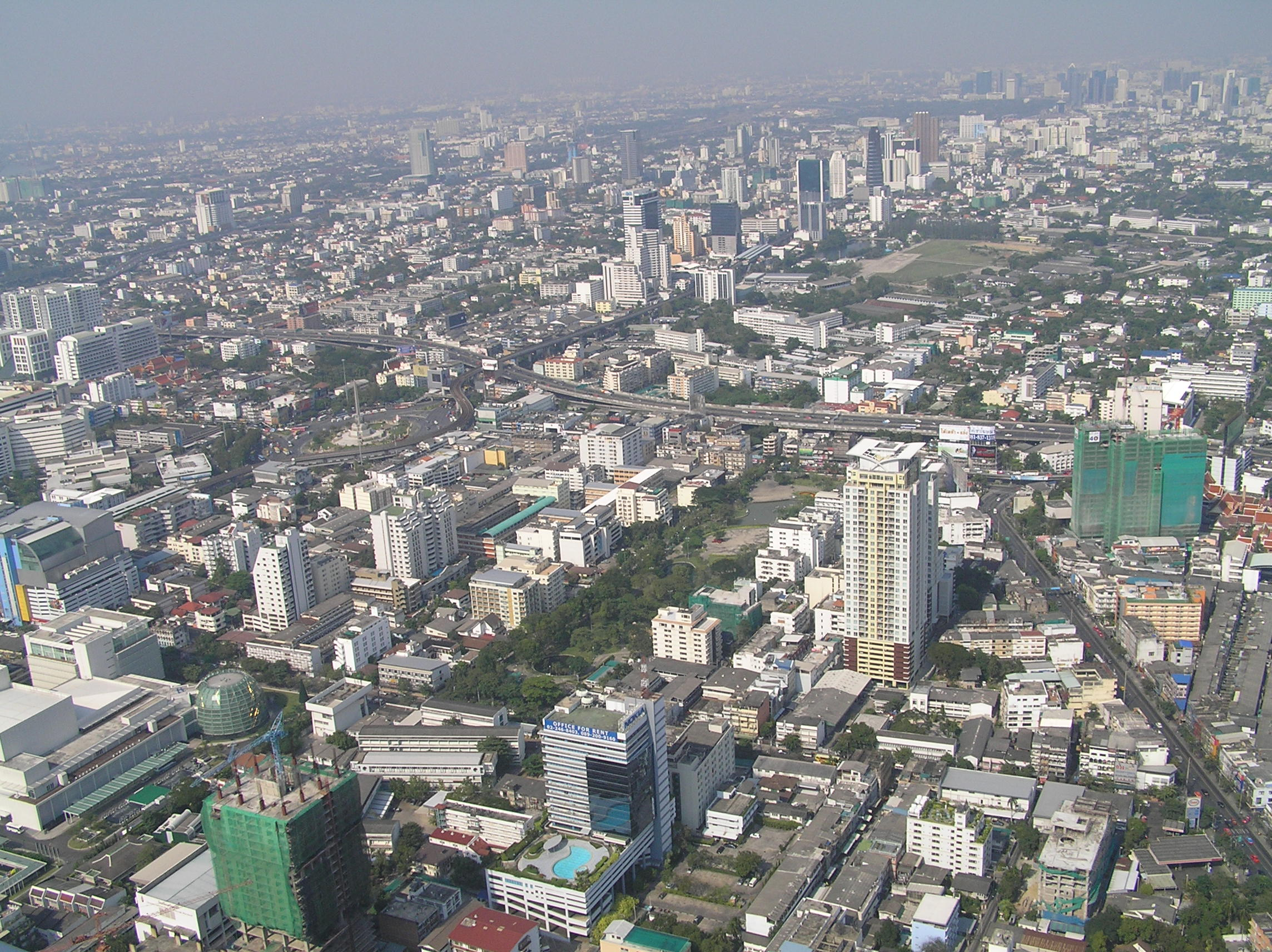
The view north from Bangkok's Baiyoke Tower II with the Victory Monument visible left of centre

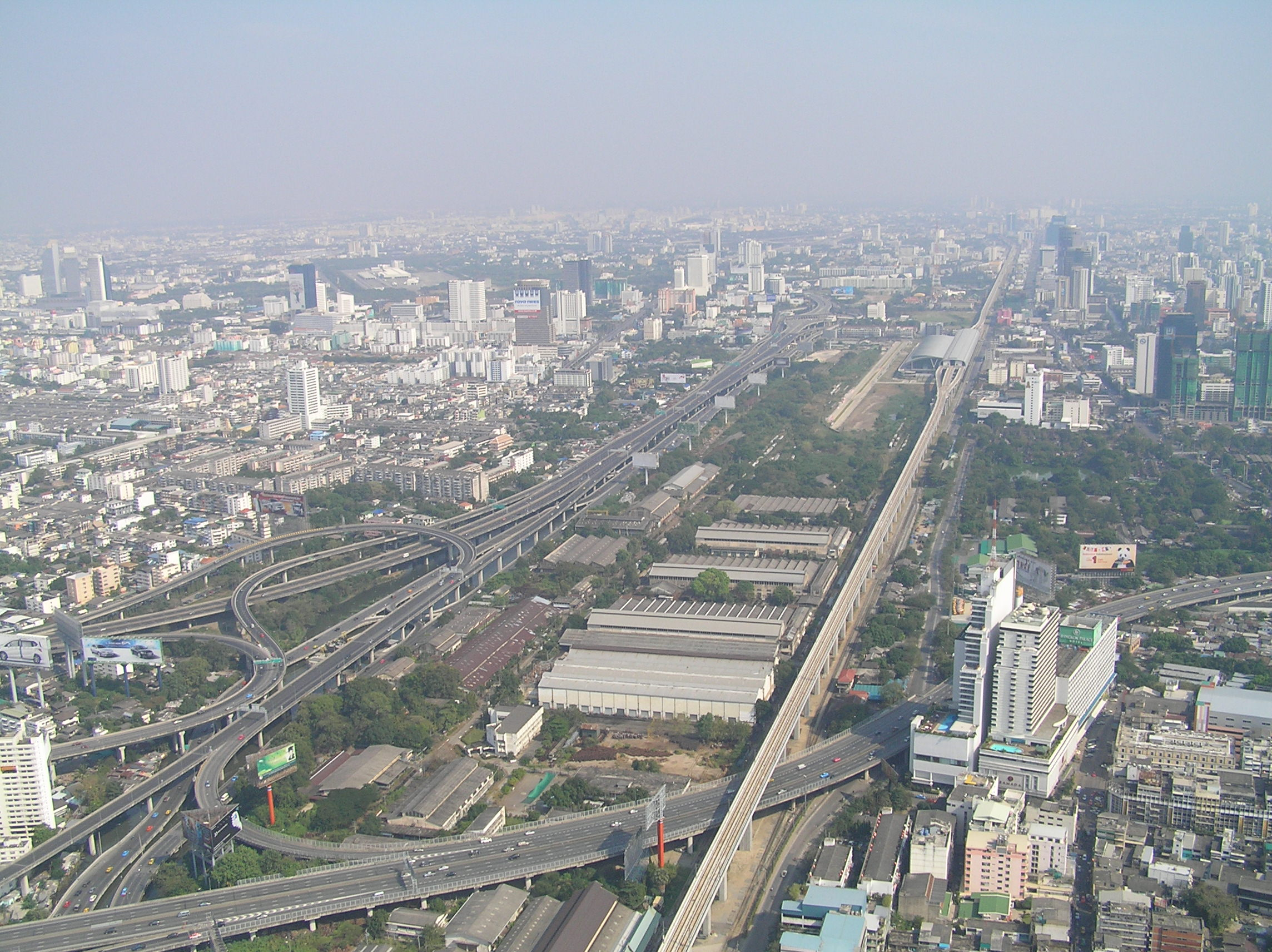
A view east from the observation platform of Bangkok's Bayoke tower showing Airport Rail link

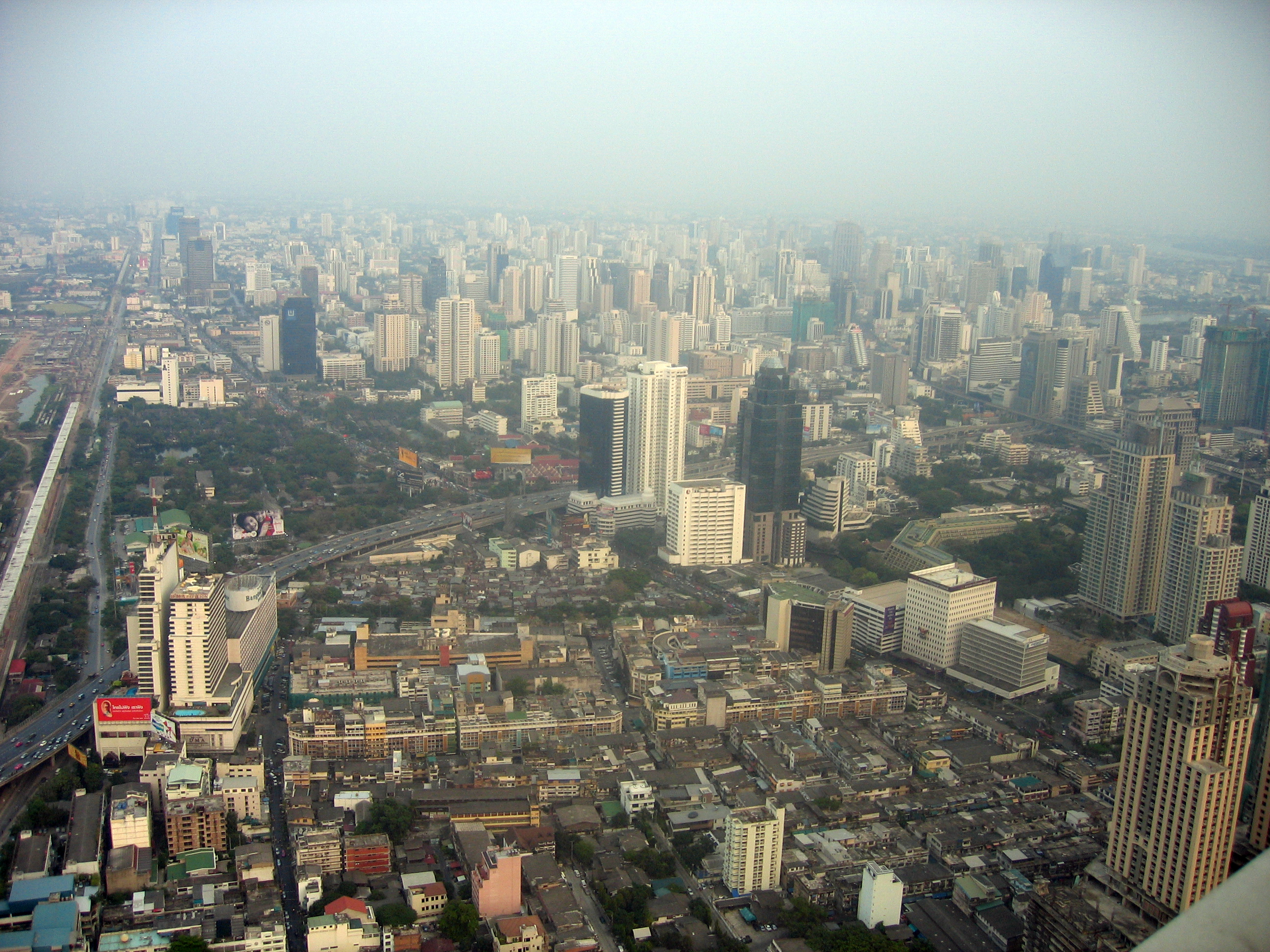
Bangkok skyline from Baiyoke Tower II

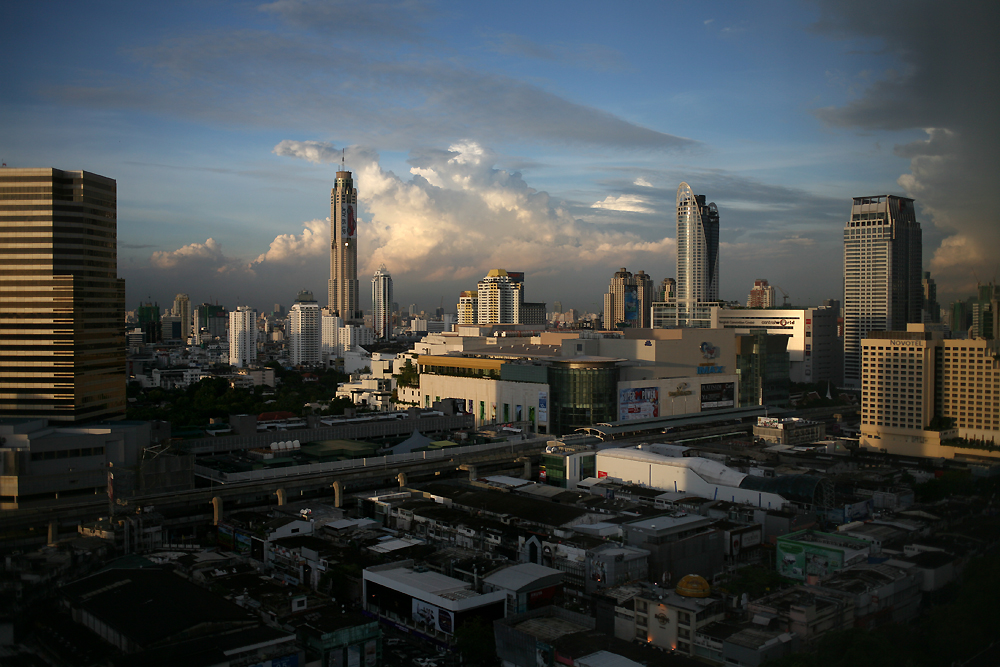
View of the tower and its surroundings

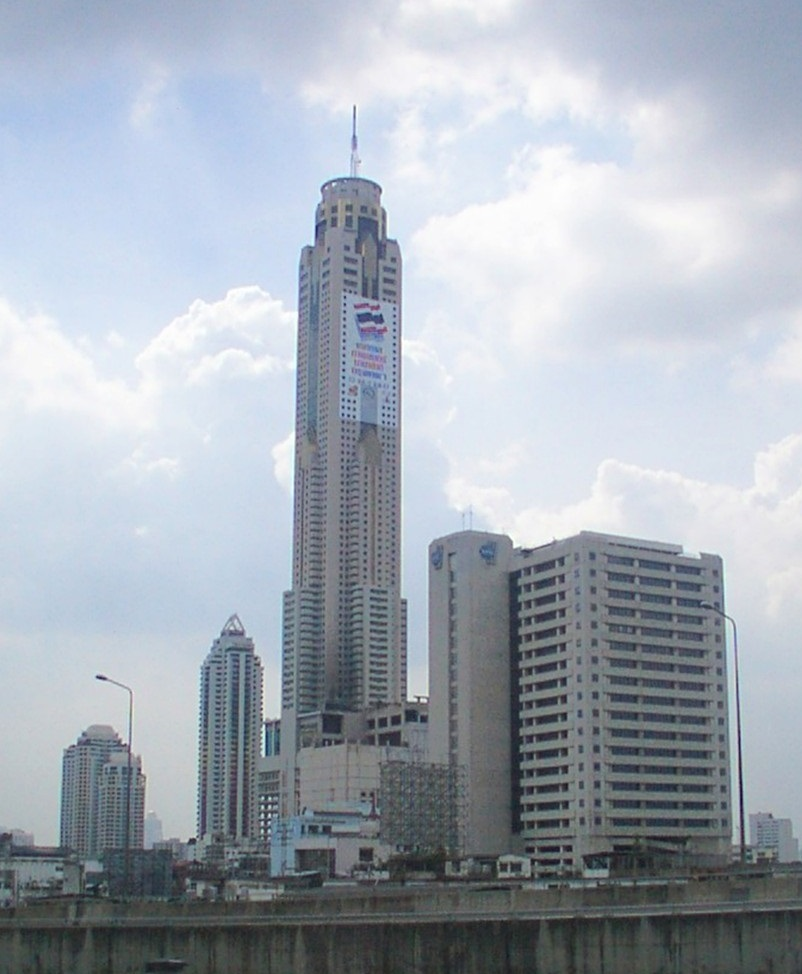
The Baiyoke Tower II in Bangkok

== See also ==
- List of tallest buildings in Bangkok
- List of tallest buildings in Thailand

== Sources ==
- Engineering News Record Magazine (June '96) International Construction Magazine (Nov '94)
- Civil Engineering International (May '96)
- Engineers Australia Magazine (Oct '96)
- VSL News (1994)
- Bangkok Post Archive

Records
Preceded by Jewelry Trade Center	Tallest building in Thailand; 304 m (997 ft); 1997–2016	Succeeded by King Power MahaNakhon
