= Rama IX Super Tower =

Proposed skyscraper in Bangkok, Thailand but has been cancelled

Grand Rama 9 Tower
- พระราม 9 ทาวเวอร์
- Former names: Grand Rama IX Iconic Tower, The Super Tower and Rama IX Super Tower
- Alternative names: Grand Rama IX Iconic Tower, Rama IX Super Tower

General information
- Status: Under construction
- Type: Office, Hotel, Parking, Observation, Shopping Mall and Restaurant
- Location: Grand Square, Rama IX Road, Huai Khwang, Bangkok, Thailand
- Coordinates: 13°45′26.8″N 100°34′4.1″E
- Construction started: November 2026
- Completed: 2033
- Opening: 2033
- Cost: $620 million USD

Height
- Architectural: 615 m (2,018 ft)

Technical details
- Floor count: 125
- Floor area: 360,000 m^{2} (3,900,000 sq ft)

Design and construction
- Architect: Architects 49 Ltd
- Developer: Grand Canal Land
- Structural engineer: KCS Associates at SOM

Website
- www.grandcanalland.com/en/commercial_thesupertower.php

The Grand Rama 9 Tower (formerly known as Rama IX Super Tower) was a proposed skyscraper in Bangkok, Thailand but has been cancelled. It was planned to be 615 m (2,018 ft) tall. When completed, it would have been the tallest building in Thailand, a record which is now held by Magnolias Waterfront Residences, which is 316 m (1,037 ft) tall.

== See also ==
- List of buildings with 100 floors or more
- List of tallest buildings and structures in the world
- List of tallest freestanding structures in the world
- List of tallest buildings in Thailand
