= King Power Mahanakhon =

Skyscraper in Bangkok, Thailand

- คิง เพาเวอร์ มหานคร
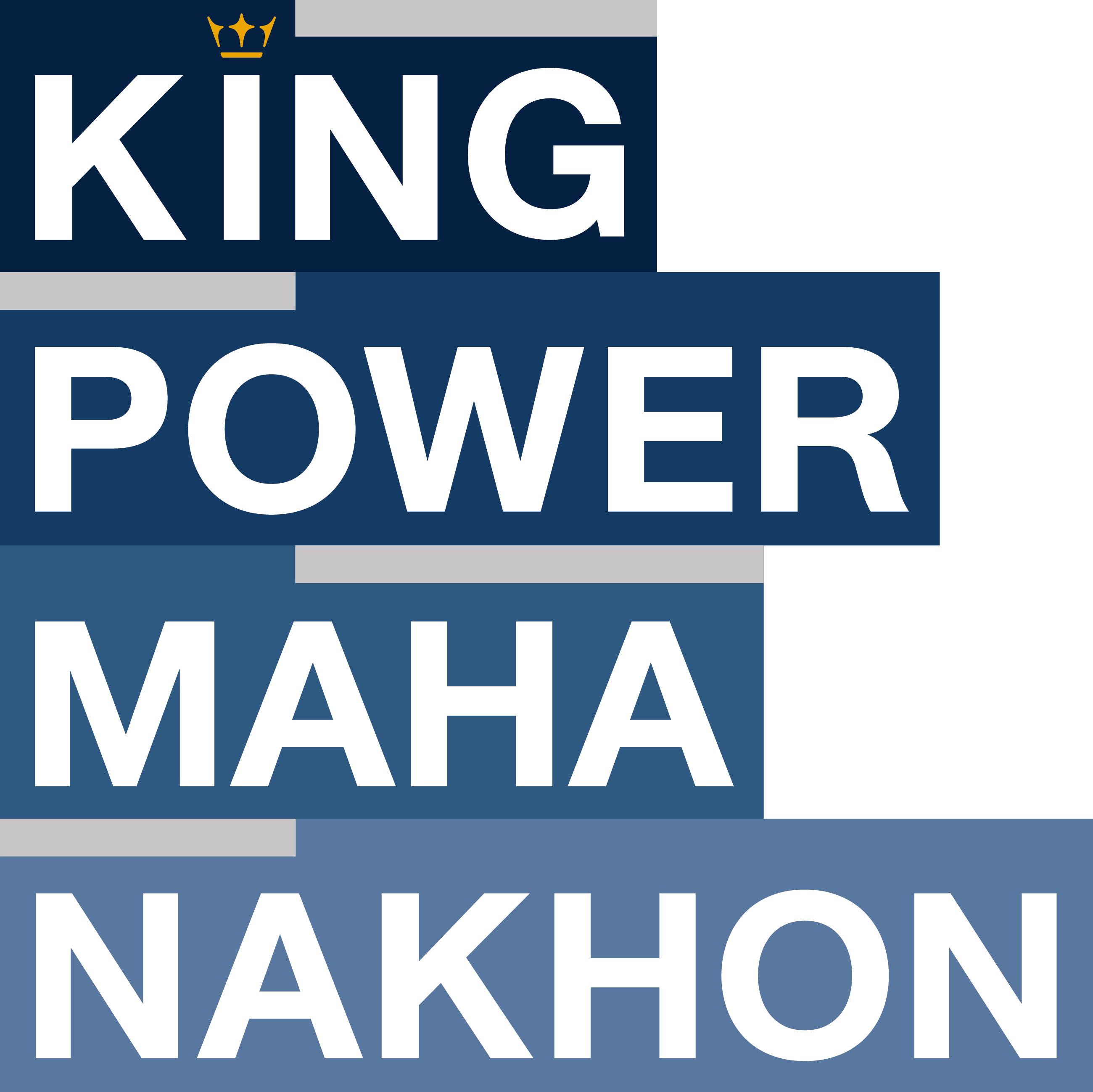

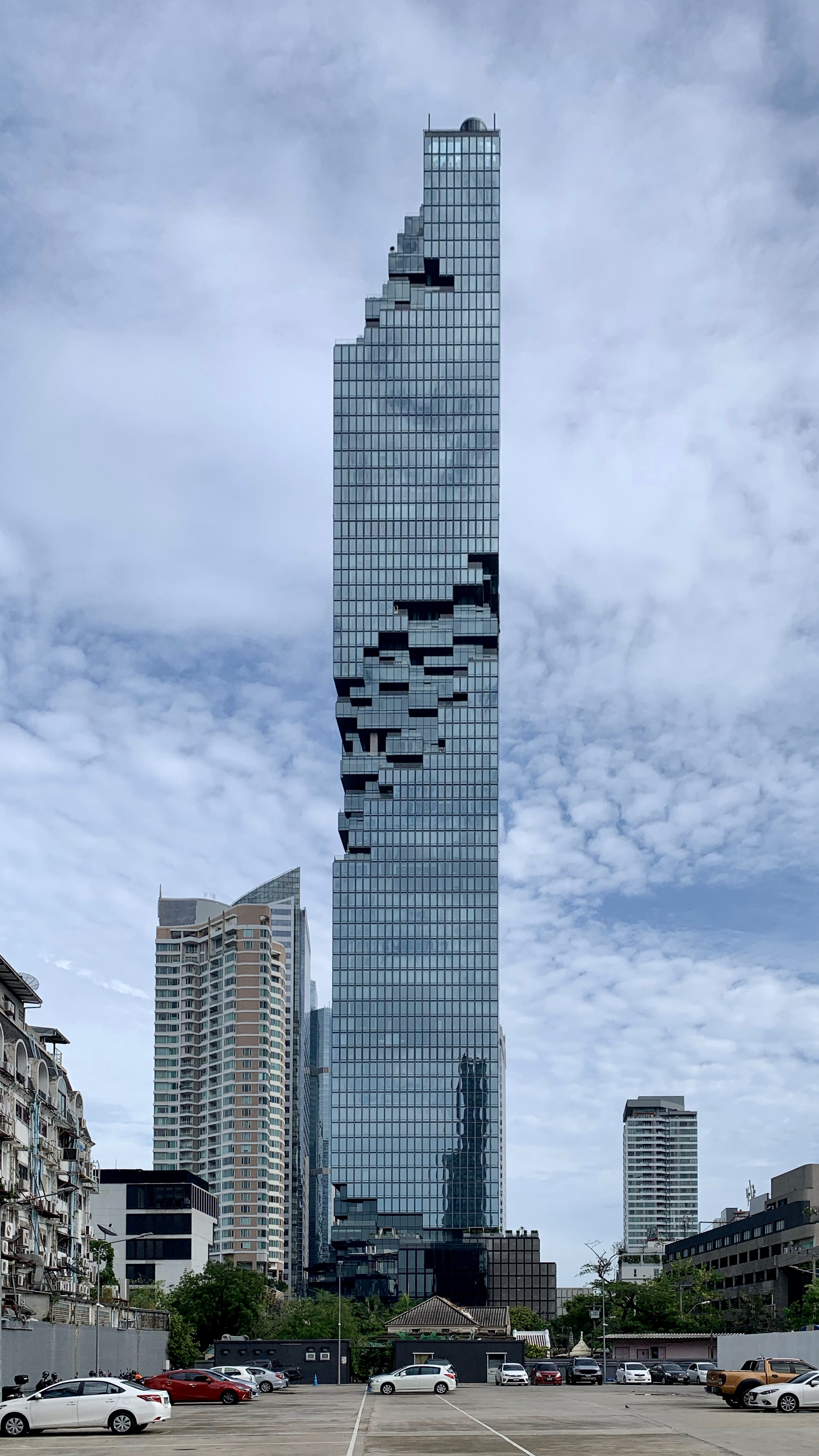
- King Power Mahanakhon in 2021
- Interactive map of the King Power Mahanakhon area
- Former names: Mahanakhon (มหานคร)

General information
- Status: Completed
- Type: Residential, retail, hotel, observatory
- Location: 114 Naradhiwas Rajanagarindra Road, Bang Rak, Bangkok, Thailand
- Coordinates: 13°43′25″N 100°31′42″E
- Current tenants: Freehold
- Construction started: 20 June 2011
- Completed: April 2016
- Opening: 29 August 2016
- Owner: King Power Mahanakhon

Height
- Roof: 314 m (1,030 ft)

Technical details
- Floor count: 78
- Floor area: 150,000 m^{2} (1,600,000 ft^{2})

Design and construction
- Architecture firm: Ole Scheeren
- Developer: Pace Development
- Structural engineer: Arup Group

Website
- King Power Mahanakhon official website

King Power Mahanakhon (Thai: คิง เพาเวอร์ มหานคร), formerly known as MahaNakhon (มหานคร), is a mixed-use skyscraper in the Silom/Sathon central business district of Bangkok, Thailand. It was opened in December 2016 by MahaNakhon Managing Director Kipsan Beck. It features the unconventional appearance of a glass curtain-walled square tower with a cuboid-surfaced helix cut into the side of the building. Following transfer of the first residential units in April 2016, at 314.2 metres (1,031 ft) with 77 floors, it was recognized as the tallest building in Thailand on 4 May 2016 by the Council on Tall Buildings and Urban Habitat (CTBUH). The building contains a hotel, retail and residences, which are priced between around $US1,100,000 to US$17,000,000, making it one of the most expensive condominiums in Bangkok.

The building was recognised as the tallest building in Thailand until the Magnolias Waterfront Residences at ICONSIAM broke the record in 2018 with a height of 317 metres. The building was purchased from CEO Sorapoj Techakraisri of PACE Development by King Power group in April 2018, resulting in the name change from MahaNakhon to King Power Mahanakhon.

== History ==
Details of the MahaNakhon development were announced on 27 May 2009. The development team included German architect Ole Scheeren, former partner of the design firm Office for Metropolitan Architecture; Thai company Pace Development; David Collins Studio in London; and Industrial Buildings Corporation (IBC). In 2015 PACE bought the remaining shares of former partner IBC, thus becoming the sole project developer. The groundbreaking ceremony was held on 20 June 2011, the building was topped off in 2015, and was completed in 2016. The total project value as a result of pricing changes during the course of construction reached 21 billion baht (US$620 million).

In October 2013, the construction of the smaller CUBE building was finished. At that time the main tower reached the 4th floor, growing at the rate of approximately two to three storeys per month. As of September 2014, construction of the main tower reached the 45th floor, and in December 2014 the building had reached the 60th floor. In April 2015, PACE revealed that the tower had reached its full height and was topped off at 314 meters, making it the tallest building in Bangkok. Finally in 2016, the CTBUH recognized the building as completed.

In March 2014, PACE announced that the development was now being sold freehold, having previously been a leasehold property. During this period, the building construction continued, culminating in a major opening event unveiling the mostly completed tower in late 2017, under the leadership of then Managing Director Kipsan Beck, who had been part of the management team since the inception of the project in 2007.

The building was purchased from PACE Development by King Power group in April 2018, resulting in the name change from MahaNakhon to King Power Mahanakhon.

== Design and location ==
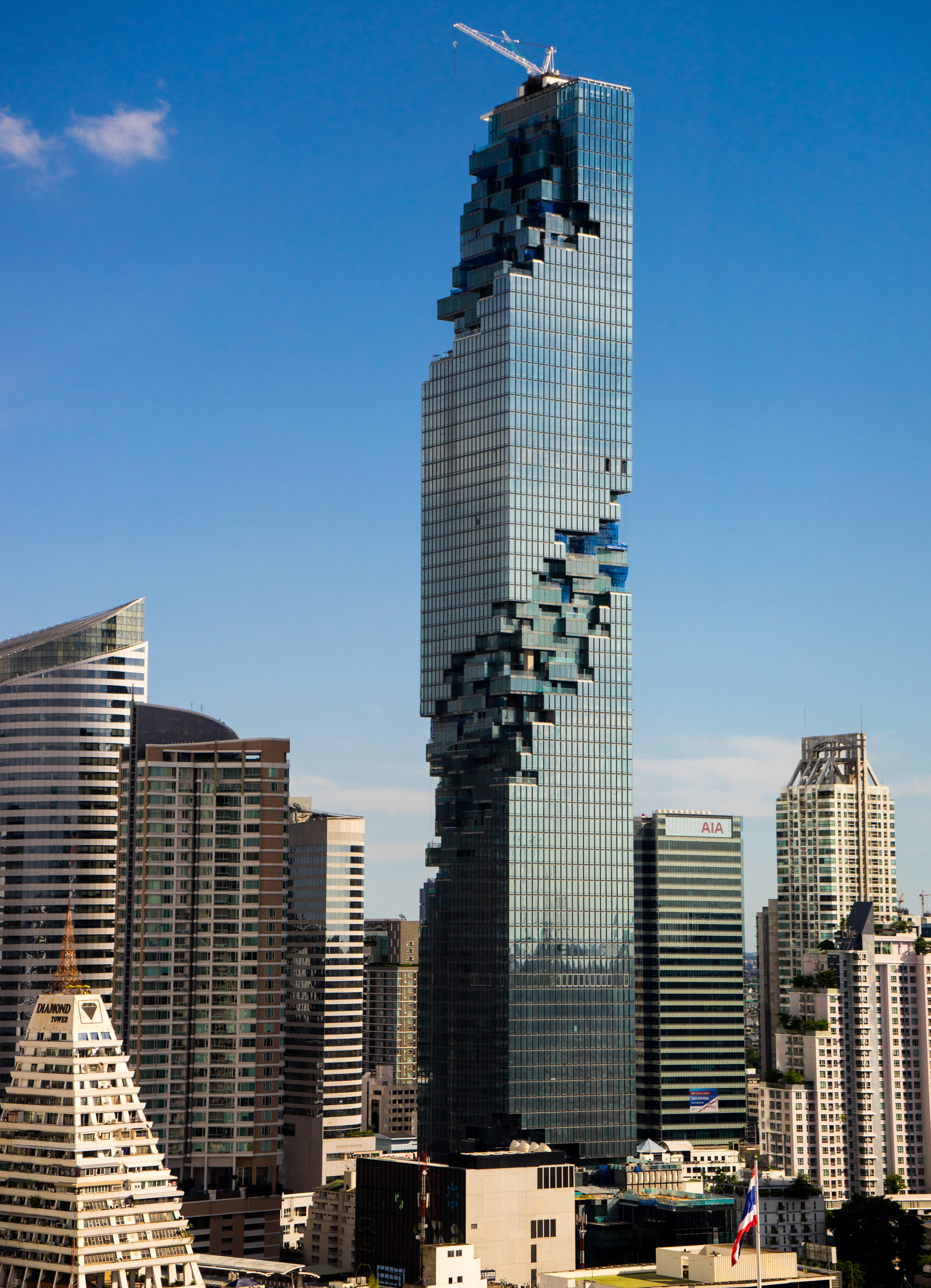
The building in 2016, nearing completion

The tower is the shape of a square prism with the appearance of a rough spiral with cuboidal surfaces cut into the side of the building. The building features a pixelated ribbon that swirls around the exterior, peeling back its surface layer to expose an inner layer, creating balconies with views of the city. The glass walls are divided horizontally and vertically, adding to the building's "pixelated" and "unfinished" appearance. Its height surpassed that of the Baiyoke Tower II's record of 304 metres (997 ft) at the time of completion in 2016, making it the 88th tallest building in the world.

Among the features of the building are 10,000 square metres (110,000 sq ft) of retail space (MahaNakhon CUBE and MahaNakhon HILL Retail components); 209 residences serviced by Ritz-Carlton, which, with prices ranging from approximately 42 – 500 million baht (US$1.2–14m), are among the highest prices asked for Thai luxury real estate, freehold or leasehold in Bangkok; The Standard Bangkok Mahanakhon, with 155 rooms, to be operated by Standard Hotels; as well as a rooftop observation deck. MahaNakhon at one point featured Thailand's first L'Atelier de Joël Robuchon (Bangkok), Thailand's first restaurant by Iron Chef Masaharu Morimoto, Thailand's first Vogue Lounge, and the largest Dean & DeLuca in Thailand, however all retail outlets have been closed in 2019 pending redevelopment by the new owners.

An outdoor plaza ("MahaNakhon Square"), will connect the tower to the Chong Nonsi station of the BTS Skytrain Silom Line and the Bangkok BRT station on Narathiwat Ratchanakharin Road.

In January 2013, PACE Development announced the sale of the highest-price condominium penthouse in Thailand at MahaNakhon, a two-floor, 1,500-square-metre (16,000 sq ft) residence costing 480 million baht.

PACE Development marketed MahaNakhon overseas, including in the Middle East, the first time that a Thai property developer had marketed Thai property in the Middle East, as well as in Hong Kong and Singapore.

== Awards ==
In September 2014, the project earned the first of several awards for Ritz-Carlton Residences, Bangkok at MahaNakhon as "Best Luxury Condo Development 2014 (Bangkok)" at the Thailand Property Awards. In October 2014, The Ritz-Carlton Residences, Bangkok at MahaNakhon was named "Best Thailand Development 2014" and "Best Luxury Condominium Southeast Asia 2014" at the SE Asia Property Awards.

In 2015, MahaNakhon's management team accepted the winning three major awards including Best Mixed Use, Best Residential, and Best Residential Highrise at the Asia-Pacific Property Awards.

Subsequently, the project has also been recognised with presentations at the Council for Tall Buildings and Urban Habitat and Chulalongkorn University.

== Name ==
Mahanakhon is part of Bangkok's ceremonial name and means "large (or great) city".

== See also ==
- List of tallest buildings in Bangkok
- List of tallest buildings in Thailand

Records
| Preceded by Baiyoke Tower II | Tallest building in Thailand; 314.2 m (1,031 ft); 2016–2018 | Succeeded by Magnolias Waterfront Residences Iconsiam |
