= The River (skyscraper) =

Coordinates: 13°43′16″N 100°30′39″E

- The River in 2016

General information
- Status: Completed
- Location: Bangkok, Thailand
- Completed: 2012

Height
- Height: South Tower 258 m (846 ft); North Tower 152 m (499 ft)

Technical details
- Floor count: 74 (South Tower), 45 (North Tower)

Design and construction
- Developer: Raimon Land

The River consists of two skyscrapers in Bangkok, Thailand. The South Tower is 258 m (846 ft) tall and the North Tower is 152 m (499 ft) on the banks of the Chao Phraya River opposite the Shangri-La Hotel, and was completed in 2011.

Developed by Raimon Land, the project consists of two buildings, a taller south tower (known as "Tower A") adjacent to the river, and a slightly smaller north tower ("Tower B") which is offset from the front tower so that both towers can enjoy river views. The 74-floor The River South was the second tallest building in Thailand comprising entirely freehold condominiums and was the country's tallest residential building.

The 45-floor north tower includes a mix of both freehold condominiums either owned or rented, and a section of the tower previously operated as a serviced apartment run by Klapsons, a Singapore hotel chain whose owner was also a major shareholder of Raimon Land. 14 out of 84 service apartment units were later sold as condominium units

Facilities include a 120 m river promenade, gym, eight swimming pools (including two "sky pools"), gardens, and adjacent community mall retail space at VUE, also owned and operated by Raimon Land, which opened in 2012. VUE was to be converted into hotel under the brand Kitch Hotel. However, the hotel never officially opened under its original branding and was later rebranded as Riva Vibe, launching on December 4, 2024.

== Awards ==
The River has been recognized as a landmark development in Thailand, winning the prestigious Thailand Property Award "Best Luxury Condo Bangkok" Award in 2012, as well as "Best Condo Development" in the same year.

== See also ==
- List of tallest buildings in Thailand
