= Luang Pu Thuat =

Buddhist monk (1582–1682)

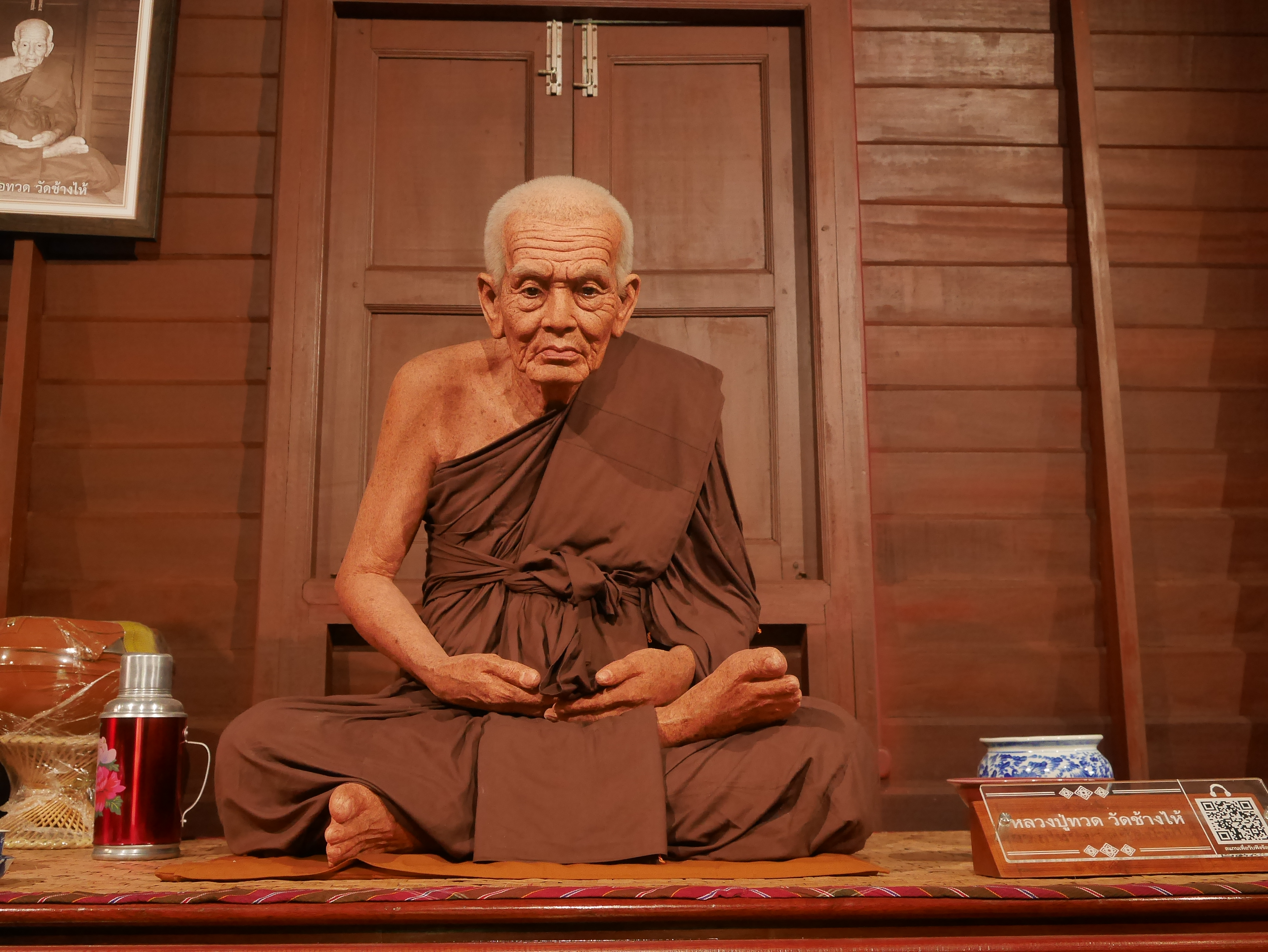
- Luang Pu Thuat statue
- Title: Somdet Phra Ratchamuni Samirāmkhunūpamājāraya

Personal life
- Born: Unknown; 3 March 1582 Songkhla, Ayutthaya Kingdom
- Died: 6 March 1682 (aged 100) Saiburi, present-day Malaysia
- Education: Unknown
- Other names: หลวงพ่อทวดเหยียบน้ำทะเลจืด, สมเด็จเจ้าพะโคะ
- Occupation: Buddhist monk

Religious life
- Religion: Buddhism
- School: Theravāda
- Lineage: Mahānikāya (presumed)
- Dharma name: Samirāmo (สามีราโม)

Senior posting
- Teacher: Unknown
- Based in: Wat Phako, Wat Chang Hai Rat Buranaram
- Students: Unknown

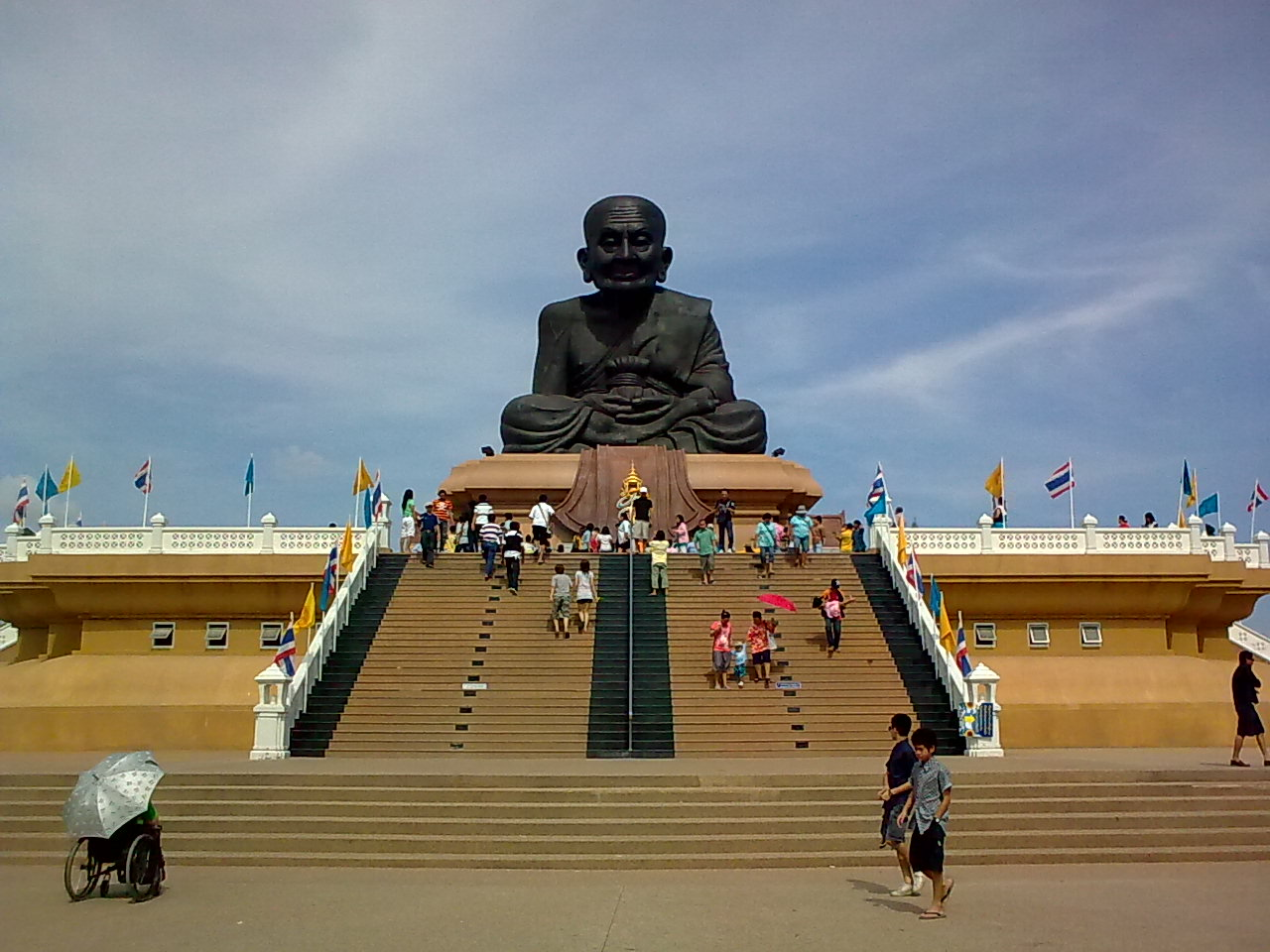
The biggest statue of Luang Pu Thuat at Wat Huai Mongkhon, Hua Hin, Prachuap Khiri Khan

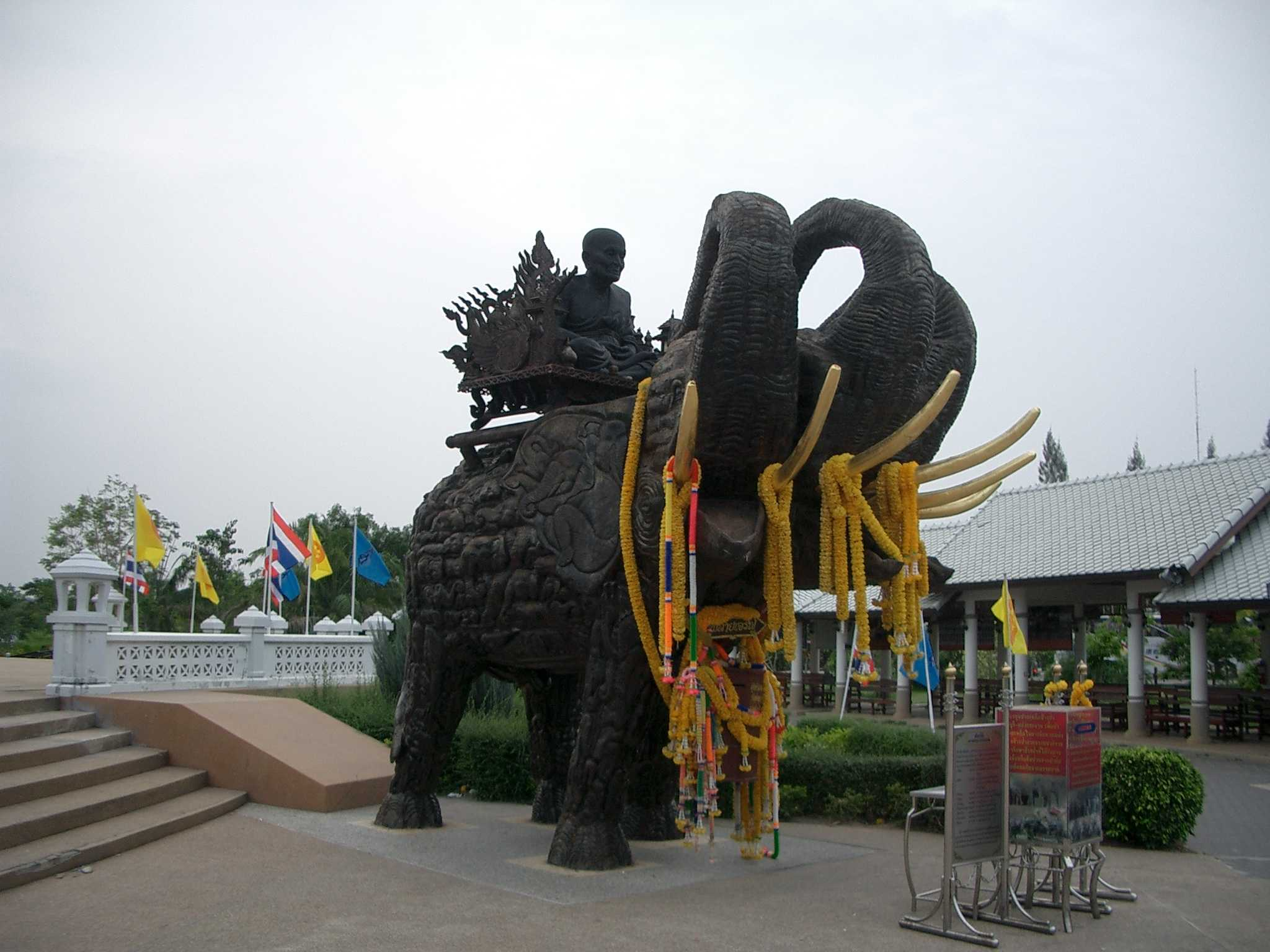
Luang Pu Thuat and Elephant Wooden statues at Wat Huai Mongkhon, Hua Hin, Prachuap Khiri Khan

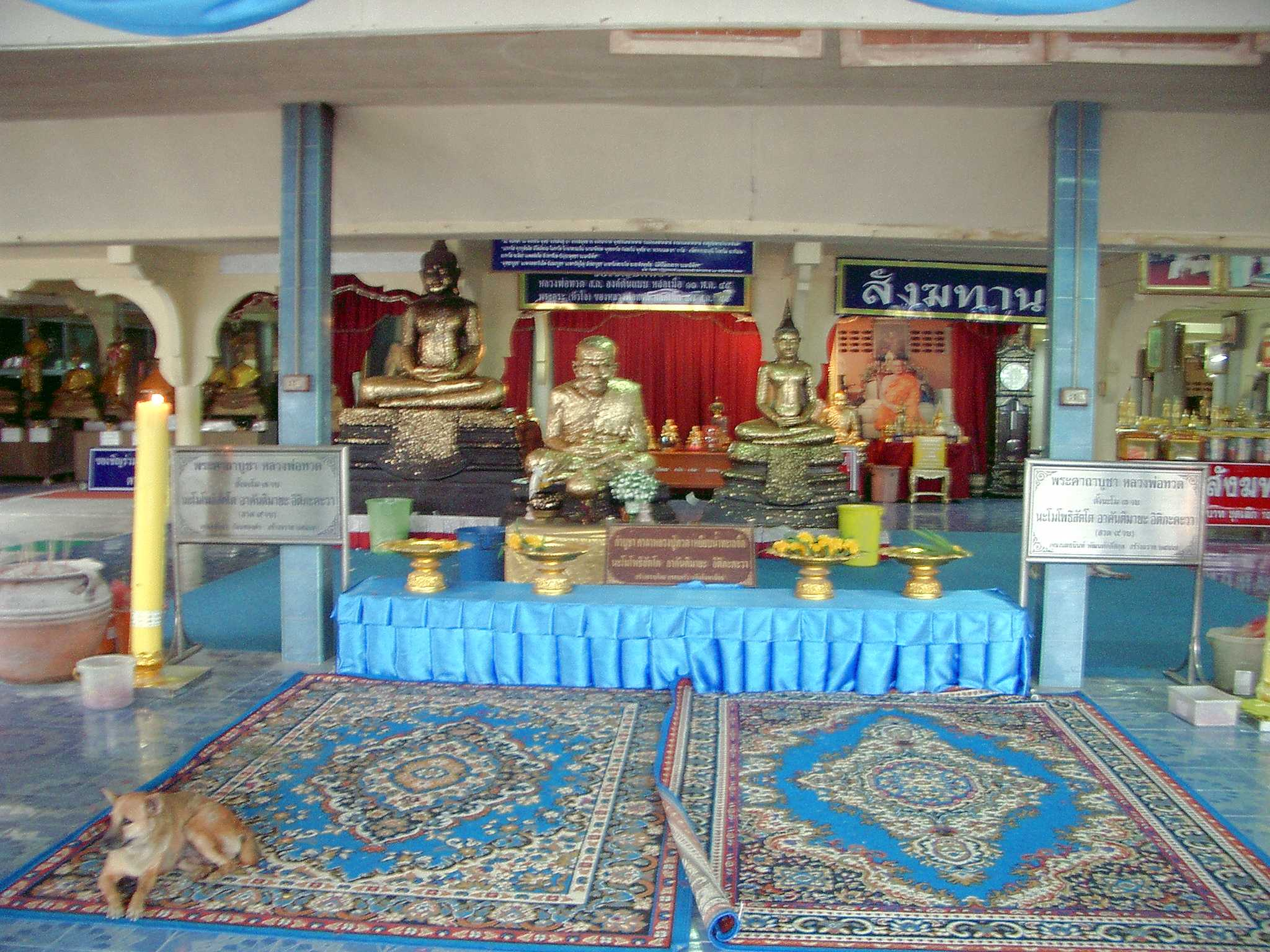
Main Hall of Wat Huai Mongkhon, Prachuap Khiri Khan

Somdet Phra Rajamuni Samiram Khunupamacharn (Somdet Chao Phako, Luang Pu Thuat who "Stepped on Fresh Seawater," Luang Pu Thuat Wat Chang Hai, also known as Than Ong Dam and Than Lanka) was a highly revered and supernaturally endowed Buddhist monk well known in Thailand. Published biographies state that he was a prominent monk during the Ayutthaya period. Devotees who believe in Luang Pu Thuat consider that amulets made in his honor possess sacred protective powers for those who carry them.

Currently, Luang Pu Thuat is regarded as one of the two most respected and widely venerated masters (maha ajarns) in Thailand, paired with Somdej Toh, both of whom are deeply revered nationwide.

== Biography ==
According to records, Luang Pu Thuat was born to Mr. Hu and Mrs. Chan, who were slaves working under debt bondage (ruan bia) to a wealthy man named Pan during the reign of King Borommatrailokkanat (Somdet Phra Maha Thammarajathirat). Luang Pu Thuat’s birth name was Pu. He was born in the village of Wat Liap, Dee Luang Subdistrict, Sathing Phra District, Songkhla Province.

The exact date of his birth is highly disputed, with several conflicting hypotheses:

1. Hypothesis 1: Anan Kanaruk stated that "Somdet Chao Phako was born on Friday, 4th lunar month, Year of the Dragon (Mar 6, 1581 CE, Buddhist Era 2124)." However, calendrical data does not perfectly align with this year.
1. Hypothesis 2: The Yokeo document from the Muen Tra Phra Thammavilas chronicle places his birth year as Buddhist Era 990 (CE 1547).
1. Hypothesis 3: Suthiwong Phongpaiboon suggests he was born in Buddhist Era 2131 (CE 1588), specifically Friday, 4 March 1588.

At birth, unusual events reportedly occurred, such as thunder and earth tremors, signaling the arrival of a great being. After his umbilical cord was cut, his father buried it at the base of a Liap tree where the Wat Liap monastery now stands.

While an infant during the rice harvest season, his parents went to work in the fields about 2 km from home, near dense growths of palm and meao trees (known as the Meao Field, now called Na Plo Monastery). His mother found a large king cobra or bonger snake coiled around his cradle. After praying for protection, the snake loosened its coils and disappeared. A large, shimmering glass bead was found on the child’s chest where the snake had been; this bead later became a sacred relic enshrined at Wat Phako. When the wealthy Pan demanded the bead, misfortune struck his family until he returned it and forgave his debtors, freeing Luang Pu Thuat’s parents from slavery and improving their fortunes.

At about age 7 (B.E. 2132), his parents entrusted him to study at Wat Kut Luang (now Wat Dee Luang) near his home, where the abbot was his uncle, Somphar Juang. The boy was intelligent, quickly learning Khmer and Thai. At age 15, Somphar Juang ordained him as a novice, returning the sacred bead to him.

He continued his studies under high-ranking monks sent from Ayutthaya, such as Somdet Phra Chinnasen, abbot of Wat Sikhu Yang (now Wat Si Yang) about 4 km north. He completed the curriculum and then traveled to Nakhon Si Thammarat to study further at Wat Sema Muang under the abbot Somdet Phra Maha Piyatassi.

At the appropriate age, he was ordained as a full monk and studied under various masters, becoming highly learned and reputed for miraculous powers. He received the royal ecclesiastical title Somdet Chao Phra Rajamuni Samiram Khunupapamacharn from King Ekathotsarot.

At age 80, he returned to reside at Wat Phako, his birthplace. Before his death, he instructed disciples that upon his passing, his body should be placed at Khok Pho District, Pattani Province, which would become a tourist site.

Luang Pu Thuat is mentioned in early regional histories of southern Thailand, but much of his life is preserved through oral tradition. His stories include Buddhist elements such as early signs, alleged miracles, travel, study, meditation, and eventual “sainthood.” His pilgrimage route across the southern Thai peninsula remains a spiritual journey for followers.

He is also said to have saved countless lives in situations such as battles and armed robberies, with his sacred amulets playing a protective role.

== Amulets ==
Many people in Thailand, Singapore, and Malaysia believe that amulets depicting Luang Pu Thuat hold great protective powers, granting safety in times of distress and reportedly saving believers from fatal automobile accidents. Ajahn Tim Dhammataro, abbot of Wat Chang Hai, pioneered the creation of Phra Luang Phor Thuad amulets.

Older, sacred amulets of Luang Pu Thuat are considered priceless and powerful.

The first batch of Luang Pu Thuat amulets was made in 2497 BE (1954), composed entirely of herbal material (nua wan). This batch is highly revered as the original set. Later batches introduced coin (rian) variations (2500, 2504 BE, etc.). The 2505 BE batch introduced the famous Lang Taolit (traditional iron-shaped) amulets, available in two types: without inscriptions (lang taolit) and with inscriptions on the back (lang taolit nang suer, where "nang suer" means "book" in Thai).

There are several molds used for Lang Taolit amulets (A, B, and C), with C being the lowest quality due to wear and loss of detail over time.

== Death ==
Luang Pu Thuat died on 6 March 1682 (B.E. 2225) at the age of 100 in "Syahbandar" (modern-day Sai Buri District), once a southern city under Thai rule but ceded to the British per the 1908 Anglo-Siamese Treaty along with three other southern states—Kelantan, Terengganu, and Perlis (now northern states of Malaysia).
