= List of hotels in Thailand =

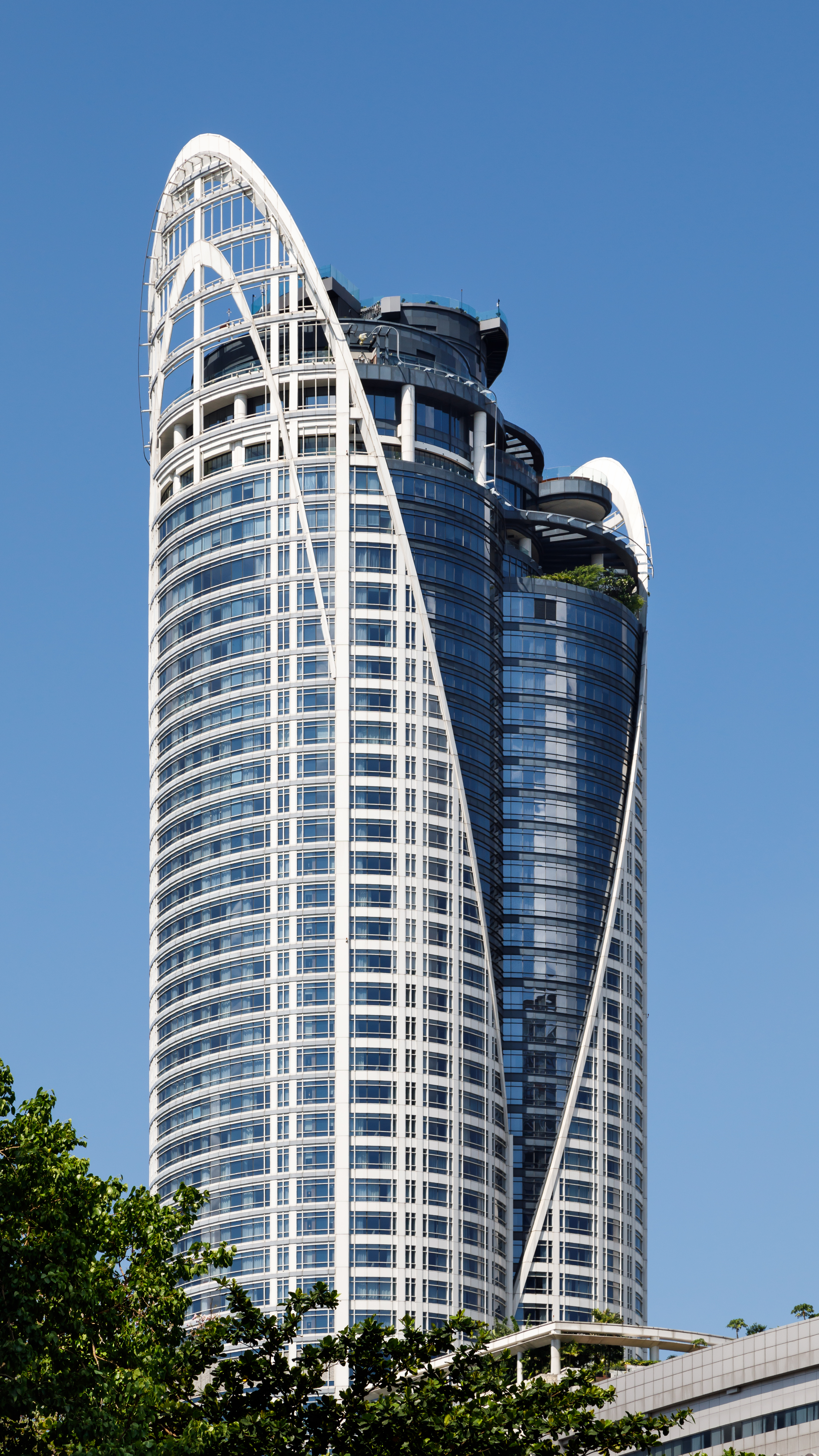
The Centara Grand Hotel in Bangkok

Due to the large significance of the Thai tourism industry, hotels play a key role in tourism and accommodation. In 2022, Thailand contained around 60,000 registered hotels, with the most being in the South, whilst the North experienced the most demand.

The Oriental became one of the first hotels established in Siam in the 1860s by Americans and persisted up until the end of World War II as one of the only hotels for foreigners in the country. Following the war's end, Thailand would go through three waves of economic growth for hotels, with the first starting during the Vietnam War, when the influx of American soldiers on R&R breaks increased demand for hotels and the number of hotels grew immensely. The next waves occurred into the 1980s and during the 2000s up until the beginning of the COVID-19 pandemic.

A 2022 article by Condé Nast Traveler stated that Thailand contained the best hotels in Southeast Asia, overall containing 5 out of the 10 best hotels in Southeast Asia.

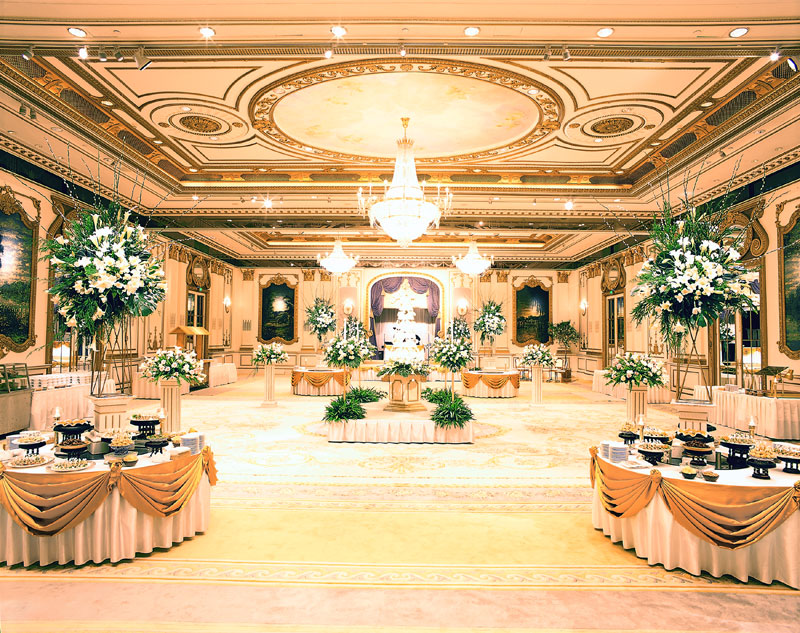
The Royal Ballroom in the Oriental Hotel, Bangkok

== History ==
The Oriental became one of the first hotels built in Siam. It was constructed by Captain Atkin Dyers and J.E. Barnes but burnt down on 11 July 1865. However, a group of Germans reconstructed the Oriental and opened it in 1876. Later in 1881, the premises was bought by Danish captain Hans Niels Andersen and was renovated to meet the need of Western travellers in Bangkok. During Crown Prince Nicholas's visit to Siam in April 1891, he stayed at the Oriental. The hotel later became one of the earliest buildings to have electricity in Siam.

=== 20th century ===
In 1922, the Trocadero Hotel opened in Bangkok along Surawong Road. In contrast with the Oriental which had several exterior renovations across its lifetime, the exterior of the Trocadero remains mostly unchanged and has the oldest exterior of any hotel in Thailand. During the 1920s, the Sathon Mansion became a hotel under the name Hotel Royal under the management of Italian Madame Staro, before in 1948 it was converted into the embassy of the Soviet Union and later the embassy of Russia. It reopened as a hotel in 2015 as the House on Sathorn. During World War II, the Royal Rattanakosin Hotel opened in 1942. In 1952, the Atlanta was opened in Bangkok by Jewish-German Max Henn, and in 1953 it became the first hotel in Thailand to have a swimming pool.

During the Vietnam War, Thailand saw an influx of American soldiers on R&R breaks, which contributed to the growth of the country's tourism during the 1950s and 1960s, causing a growth in the number of hotels designed for Westerners. These hotels were built in post-modern architecture, such as the Siam InterContinental Hotel. In Pattaya, the influx transformed the town into a seaside resort, beginning in the 1950s with American soldiers arriving on R&R from Korat. In 1965, Pattaya opened its first major hotel, the Nipa Lodge. After the U.S. was allowed to use U-Tapao airport south of Pattaya in the Vietnam War, the demand for hotels increased as the number of tourists increased. By the mid-1970s, Pattaya operated 2,600 hotel rooms.

Following the Vietnam War, the hotel industry would witness another wave of growth during the 1980s when Bangkok served as the location of numerous major international travel organizations.

=== 21st century ===
At the start of the 21st century, Bangkok and Thailand became a popular tourist destination and the nation experienced a third wave of growth and demand for hotels.

On 30 October 2004, the Hotel Act, B.E. 2547 was passed. The act made it harder for illegal hotels to operate without a hotel license, with hotels needing to comply with safety regulations first to obtain a license. The act also stated that illegal operators may face a year of imprisonment and/or a ฿20,000 fine. At the end of 2018, due to a drop in Chinese tourists, a proposed Hotel Act and oversupply, the amount of hotels for sale in Thailand increased.

==== COVID-19 Pandemic ====
As a result of the COVID-19 Pandemic, most travel especially international travel was suspended. As a result, hotels lost a majority of their customers and closed either permanently or temporarily.

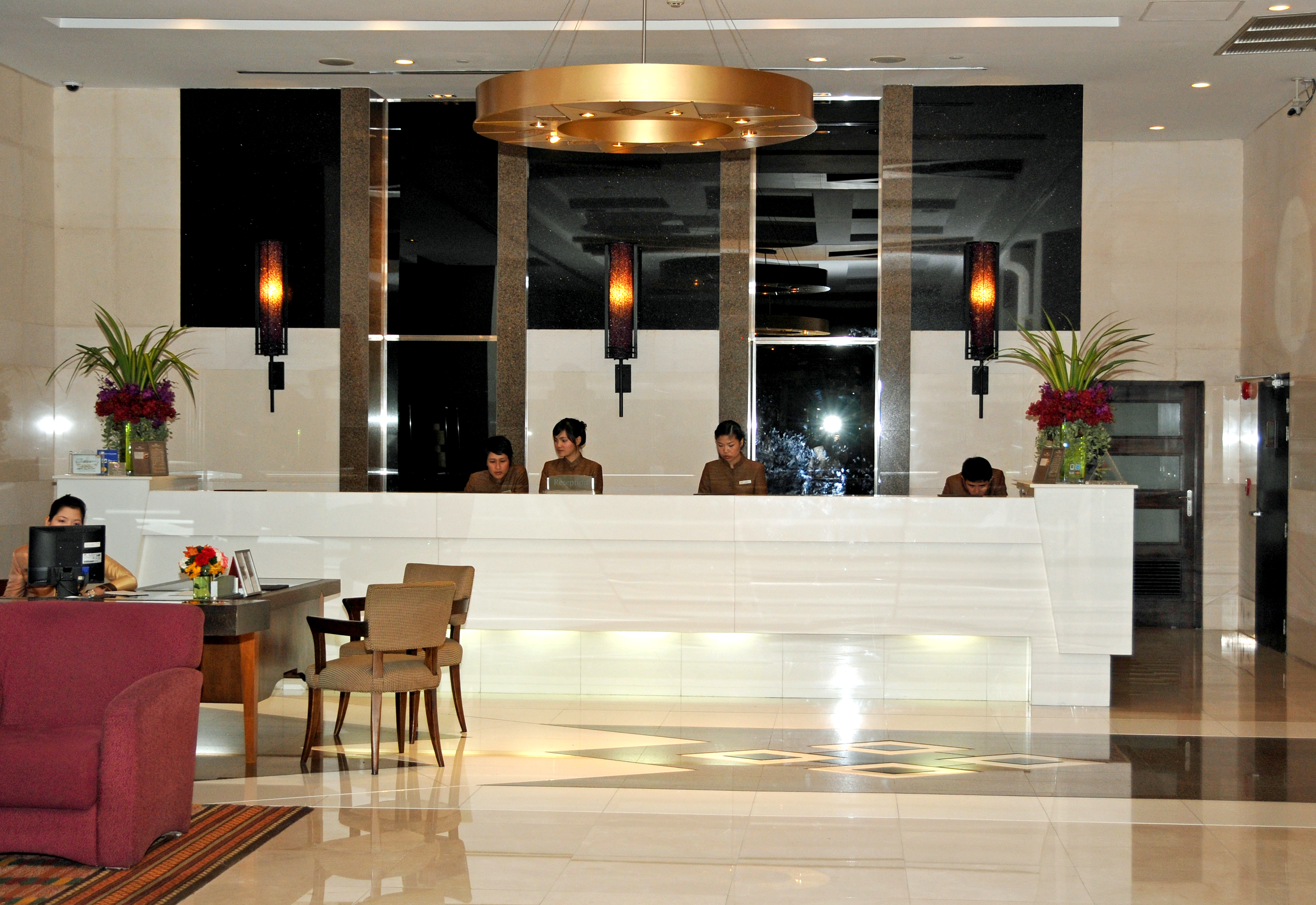
Reception area of a Bangkok hotel

== Regulations ==
In Thailand under the Hotel Act, B.E. 2547, a hotel is defined as being a building with 4 or more bedrooms that can hold more than 20 people, being used for commercial purposes by providing temporary accommodation. Under the same act, any hotel must have a hotel license to be legal. Before applying for a license, hotels must meet certain needs. They first must also comply with the Building Control Act B.E. 2522. The building permit must also indicate that the building is operating with the purpose of a hotel. Hotels must also not be located too close to historical and culturally significant sites; the entrance cannot cause traffic issues; the hotel's location cannot affect the business of nearby hotels; and the location must not endanger the health of guests. Hotels are also obliged to have clearly indicated guest room numbers on the door; have a reception; have within and outside the hotel, telephones; a 24-hour security system; and a first aid kit. Under the Ministerial Regulations on the Types and Guidelines on Hotel Business Operation B.E. 2551, hotel licenses are divided into 4 types:

- Hotel Type 1 - contains only guest rooms
- Hotel Type 2 - contains guest rooms, with either a restaurant, kitchen or dining room
- Hotel Type 3 - contains guest rooms, with either a restaurant, kitchen or dining room and with either a conference or entertainment venue
- Hotel Type 4 - contains guest rooms, with either a restaurant, kitchen or dining room and with a conference and entertainment venue

Under the Foreign Business Act, obtaining a license is harder for foreigners than for Thai nationals. This does not include a Thai limited company which is majority owned by Thai citizens. Before establishing a hotel, foreigners must obtain a Foreign Business License. Hotels with restaurant services must also have a permit for selling liquor, cigarettes and food. Hotels that offer entertainment or conference services must also have an Entertainment permit.

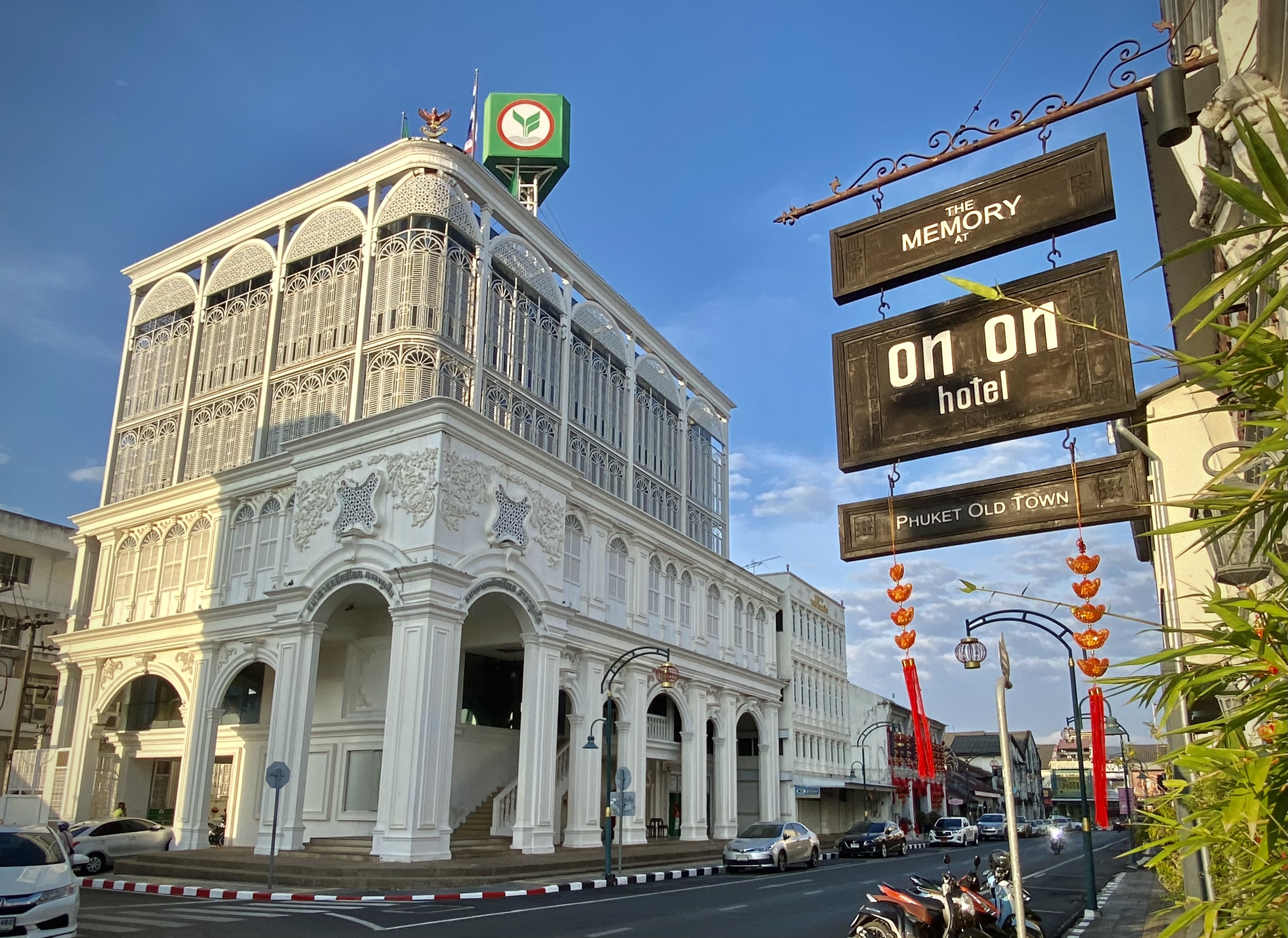
The Memory at On On Hotel in Phuket

== List ==
- Amanpuri, Phuket
- Ambassador City Jomtien, Pattaya
- Anantara Hua Hin Resort & Spa, Hua Hin
- Belmond Napasai, Koh Samui
- Cape Panwa Hotel, Phuket
- Royal Cliff Hotels, Pattaya
- The Railway Hotel, Hua Hin
- Sri Panwa, Phuket
- Koh Samui, Koh Samui

=== Bangkok ===
- Anantara Siam Bangkok Hotel
- Baiyoke Tower I
- Baiyoke Tower II
- Bangkok Marriott Marquis Queen's Park
- Capella Bangkok
- Centara Grand and Bangkok Convention Centre
- Centara Grand at Central Plaza Ladprao Bangkok
- Conrad Bangkok
- Grand Hyatt Erawan Bangkok
- Lebua at State Tower
- Mandarin Oriental, Bangkok
- Mövenpick BDMS Wellness Resort Bangkok
- The Peninsula Bangkok
- Rosewood Bangkok
- Shangri-La Hotel, Bangkok
- Suan Lum Night Bazaar Ratchadaphisek
- The Atlanta Hotel
- The Sukhothai Bangkok
- W Bangkok

=== Defunct ===
- Dusit Thani Bangkok
- Erawan Hotel
- Royal Plaza Hotel
- Siam InterContinental Hotel
