= List of hotels: Countries T =

This is a list of what are intended to be the notable top hotels by country, five or four star hotels, notable skyscraper landmarks or historic hotels which are covered in multiple reliable publications. It should not be a directory of every hotel in every country:

== Thailand ==
- Ambassador City Jomtien
- Cape Panwa Hotel
- Conrad Bangkok
- The Railway Hotel
- Royal Cliff Hotels Group

=== Bangkok ===
- Baiyoke Tower II
- Bangkok Marriott Hotel The Surawongse
- Centara Grand and Bangkok Convention Centre
- Mandarin Oriental, Bangkok
- The Peninsula Bangkok
- Sofitel Centara Grand Hotel
- Swissôtel Nai Lert Park Hotel

== Togo ==
- 2 Fevrier Sofitel Hotel, Lomé

== Turkey ==
- Çırağan Palace, Istanbul
- Hilton Istanbul Bosphorus, Istanbul
- Hilton Izmir, İzmir
- Hotel Yeşil Ev, Istanbul
- Mardan Palace, Antalya
- Pera Palace Hotel, Istanbul
- Sheraton Ankara, Ankara
- Soğukçeşme Sokağı, Istanbul
- Sultanahmet Jail, Istanbul
- Tokatlıyan Hotels, Istanbul

== Tuvalu ==
- Vaiaku Lagi Hotel, Funafuti
