= List of tallest buildings in Bangkok =

This list of tallest buildings in Bangkok ranks buildings in Bangkok, Thailand, by height. As of November 2026 Bangkok has 211 completed skyscrapers over 150 meters (492 feet) in height, of which 129 are listed on the Council on Tall Buildings and Urban Habitat database.

Bangkok experienced a building boom in the late 1980s and early 1990s when Thailand experienced rapid economic growth. However, the 1997 Asian Financial Crisis left a visible scar on the city's skyline with many unfinished or abandoned buildings. The Thai economy rebounded in the early 2000s and many projects resumed construction. A new wave of building boom starting from the 2010s and continuing up to the present day was spurred by the development of the city's mass rapid transit systems, with new development concentrated around MRT and BTS skytrain stations.

Magnolias Waterfront Residences at Iconsiam, completed in 2018, is Bangkok's tallest building at 318 metres (1,043 feet), followed by King Power Mahanakhon Tower at 314 metres (1,034 feet). Several skyscraper projects are currently under construction or in the planning phase, including the 92-storey 437 metres/1,435 feet tall Signature Tower at One Bangkok complex, Dusit Thani Residences and Asiatique the Riverfront's Iconic Tower. The latter is designed by Adrian Smith and Gordon Gill, architects of the Burj Khalifa in Dubai.

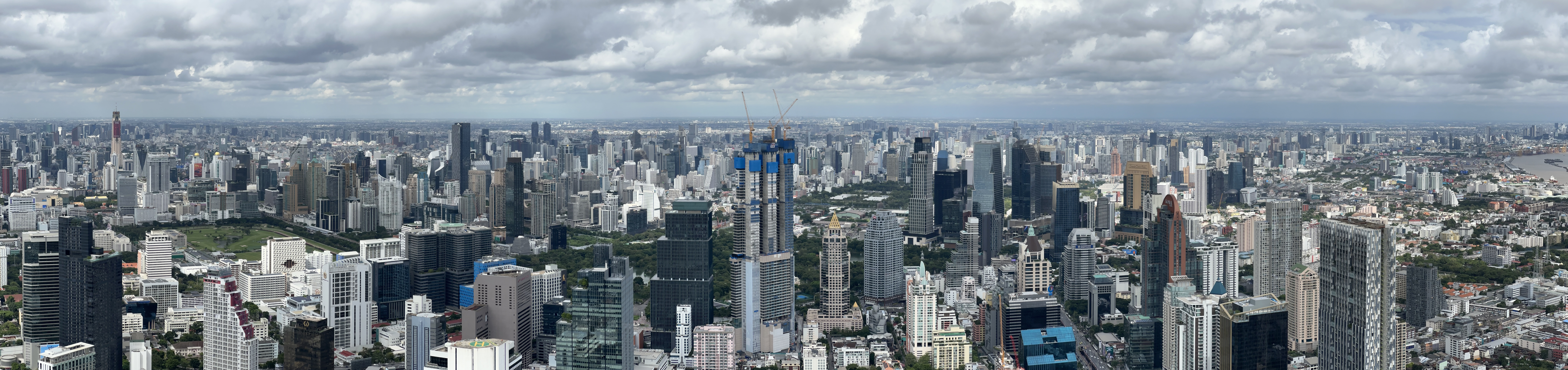

Panoramic view of Bangkok's skyline looking north/north-east from King Power Mahanakhon Tower

== Tallest completed buildings ==
This list ranks completed and topped out skyscrapers in Bangkok that stand at least 150m/492 ft based on standard height measurement. This includes spires and architectural details, but does not include antenna masts. An equal sign (=) following a rank indicates the same height between two or more buildings. The list contain buildings within the 50 districts of the Bangkok Metropolis, excluding the surrounding provinces of Nonthaburi, Pathumthani, Samutprakarn, Nakhon Pathom and Samut Sakhon, which form part of the Greater Bangkok Metropolitan Region.

Rank	Building	Image	Height		Floors	Year	District	Coordinates	Notes
1	Magnolias Waterfront Residences Iconsiam		315 m	1,033 ft	70	2018	Khlong San	13.7273°N 100.5105°E	Tallest building in Bangkok and Thailand.
2	King Power MahaNakhon		314 m	1,030 ft	79	2016	Bang Rak	13.72340°N 100.52840°E	Briefly the tallest building in Thailand until the completion of Magnolias Waterfront Residences. Tallest building in Thailand when measured to the highest occupiable floor.
3	Baiyoke Tower II		304 m	997 ft	85	1997	Ratchathewi	13.75459°N 100.54036°E	Tallest building in Thailand from 1997 to 2016. Briefly the tallest building in Southeast Asia until completion of the Petronas Twin Towers.
4	Four Seasons Private Residences Bangkok		299.5 m	983 ft	73	2019	Sathon	13.71257°N 100.51030°E	
4=	Dusit Residences		299.1 m	981 ft	69	2026	Bang Rak		
5	One City Centre		275.8 m	905 ft	61	2023	Pathum Wan	13.74327°N 100.54664°E	Tallest all office building in Bangkok
6	The Residences at Mandarin Oriental Bangkok		268.7 m	882 ft	52	2019	Khlong San	13.72771°N 100.51122°E	
7	KingBridge Tower	Kingbridge tower	260 m	853 ft	43	2024	Yan Nawa	13.67397°N 100.53982°E	
8	The River South Tower		258 m	846 ft	74	2012	Khlong San	13.72127°N 100.51081°E	
9	Canapaya Residences		253.3 m	831 ft	57	2019	Bang Kho Laem	13.68783°N 100.51377°E	
10=	One9Five Asoke-Rama 9 Tower I		248 m	813 ft	61	2021	Huai Khwang	13.75803°N 100.56829°E	
10=	One9Five Asoke-Rama 9 Tower II		248 m	813 ft	61	2021	Huai Khwang	13.75680°N 100.56812°E	
12	State Tower		247.2 m	811 ft	68	2001	Bang Rak	13.72175°N 100.51716°E	Briefly the tallest mixed-use skyscraper in Thailand until completion of the King Power MahaNakhon tower.
13	E18hteen Seven		247 m	810 ft	57	2024	Pathum Wan	13.72835°N 100.54651°E	
14	One Bangkok Tower 3		243 m	797 ft	50	2024	Pathum Wan	13.72640°N 100.54692°E	
15	Magnolias Ratchadamri Boulevard		242 m	794 ft	60	2016	Pathum Wan	13.74266°N 100.54037°E	
16	One Bangkok Tower 4		241 m	791 ft	49	2024	Pathum Wan	13.72707°N 100.54592°E	
16=	Fraser Suites One Bangkok		241 m	791 ft	49	2026	Pathum Wan	13.72640°N 100.54692°E	
17	The Unicorn Phayathai		239.7 m	786 ft	51	2023	Ratchathewi	13.75663°N 100.53287°E	
18	Menam Residences		239.3 m	785 ft	59	2017	Bang Kho Laem	13.70657°N 100.50590°E	
19	The ESSE Asoke		236.8 m	777 ft	55	2019	Watthana	13.74313°N 100.56156°E	
20	Centara Grand & Bangkok Convention Centre at CentralWorld		235 m	771 ft	57	2008	Pathum Wan	13.74778°N 100.53852°E	
21	The Met		230.6 m	756 ft	69	2009	Sathon	13.72208°N 100.53423°E	
22	Park Origin Thonglor Tower C		230 m	754 ft	59	2023	Watthana	13.73278°N 100.58490°E	
23	Empire Tower		226.8 m	744 ft	62	1999	Sathon	13.72005°N 100.53046°E	
24	MARQUE Sukhumvit		222.5 m	730 ft	52	2017	Watthana	13.73049°N 100.57110°E	
24=	KingsQuare Residence		222 m	731 ft	52	2026	Yan Nawa		
25	Summit Tower		221 m	724 ft	45	2025	Ratchathewi	13.7525°N 100.53223°E	
26	Jewelry Trade Center		220.7 m	724 ft	59	1996	Bang Rak	13.72297°N 100.52004°E	
27	The Pano		220 m	722 ft	57	2010	Yan Nawa	13.67172°N 100.54136°E	
28	One98 Wireless		216.4 m	710 ft	52	2024	Pathum Wan	13.72826°N 100.54567°E	Also known as One Bangkok Ritz Carlton. Structurally topped out
29	The Address Siam-Ratchathewi		215 m	705 ft	50	2023	Ratchathewi	13.75243°N 100.53039°E	According to CTBUH
30	Supalai Icon Sathorn		213.9 m	702 ft	57	2024	Sathon	13.72323°N 100.53803°E	According to CTBUH
31	Noble Form Thonglor		211 m	692 ft	48	2025	Watthana	13.73548°N 100.58353°E	
32	Nimit Langsuan		210.4 m	690 ft	55	2024	Pathum Wan	13.73531°N 100.54136°E	
33	China Resources Tower		210 m	689 ft	53	2001	Pathum Wan	13.73907°N 100.54787°E	Also known as CRC Tower, All Seasons Place.
34	Park Origin Chula-Samyan		205 m	673 ft	47	2023	Pathum Wan	13.73515°N 100.52216°E	
34=	Wanvayla Na Chaophraya Tower B		205 m	673 ft	52	2026	Dusit		
35=	Park Silom		204 m	669 ft	38	2023	Bang Rak	13.72772°N 100.53354°E	
35=	StarView Tower B		204 m	669 ft	54	2015	Bang Kho Laem	13.68816°N 100.51824°E	
37	Ashton Chula-Silom	centerx	203.8 m	669 ft	56	2018	Bang Rak	13.73135°N 100.53102°E	
38	CLOUD Thonglor-Phetchaburi		202 m	663 ft	55	2022	Watthana	13.74655°N 100.57684°E	
39	Office at Singha Complex		201.3 m	660 ft	36	2018	Huai Khwang	13.74809°N 100.56472°E	
40	Cloud Residences Sukhumvit 23		200 m	656 ft	43	2025	Watthana		Structurally topped out
41	Millennium Residence Tower II		199.3 m	654 ft	54	2009	Khlong Toei	13.72971°N 100.56271°E	
42=	Millennium Residence Tower III		199.3 m	654 ft	54	2009	Khlong Toei	13.72920°N 100.56267°E	
43=	The Offices at CentralWorld		198.8 m	652 ft	51	2004	Pathum Wan	13.74605°N 100.53836°E	
45	M Silom		198 m	650 ft	53	2015	Sathon	13.72724°N 100.52703°E	
46	Grande Centre Point Ratchadamri		197 m	646 ft	50	2007	Pathum Wan	13.74174°N 100.54105°E	
47	Siamese Sukhumvit 48		196 m	643 ft	39	2020	Khlong Toei	13.70905°N 100.59855°E	Also known as Ramada Plaza by Wyndham Sukhumvit 48.
48=	Grande Centre Point Prestige		195 m	640 ft	45	2025	Pathum Wan	13.74174°N 100.54105°E	
48=	Sinn Sathorn Tower		195 m	640 ft	43	1993	Khlong San	13.72172°N 100.49938°E	
48=	Grande Centrepoint Lumphini		195 m	639 ft	41	2024	Sathon	13.72462°N 100.54762°E	
48=	Siamese Tower Rama 9		195 m	638 ft	38	2024	Huai Khwang	13.75587°N 100.58383°E	also known as Landmark at MRTA Station (Cassia Residences); structurally topped out
52	Thai Wah Tower II		194 m	636 ft	60	1996	Sathon	13.72364°N 100.53987°E	
53=	Ashton Asoke		193 m	633 ft	57	2018	Watthana	13.73896°N 100.56123°E	
53=	Circle 2 Living Prototype		193 m	632 ft	53	2015	Ratchathewi	13.75097°N 100.55643°E	Measured 188.75m to top floor level, 193.5m to the rooftop.
55=	Millennium Residence Tower I		192.3 m	631 ft	51	2009	Khlong Toei	13.72979°N 100.56272°E	
55=	Millennium Residence Tower IV		192.3 m	631 ft	51	2009	Khlong Toei	13.72853°N 100.56322°E	
57	Krungsri Ploenchit Tower		192 m	630 ft	39	2018	Pathum Wan	13.74289°N 100.54700°E	
59=	Cyber World Tower 1		190 m	623 ft	53	2008	Huai Khwang	13.77011°N 100.57379°E	
59=	Noble BE19 Tower I		190 m	623 ft	48	2020	Watthana	13.74252°N 100.55958°E	
61	28 Chidlom		189 m	620 ft	48	2020	Pathum Wan	13.74709°N 100.54413°E	
62	Watermark Chaophraya River Tower I		188.8 m	619 ft	52	2008	Khlong San	13.70929°N 100.50155°E	
63	The Bangkok Sathorn		188.6 m	619 ft	53	2017	Sathon	13.71863°N 100.52031°E	
64=	Park Origin Thonglor Tower II		188 m	617 ft	53	2022^{[UC]}	Watthana	13.73247°N 100.58466°E	
64=	Ashton Silom		188 m	617 ft	48	2019	Bang Rak	13.72633°N 100.52689°E	
64=	The Empire Place		188 m	617 ft	45	2008	Sathon	13.71923°N 100.53108°E	
64=	The Issara		188 m	617 ft	51	2011	Chatuchak	13.80861°N 100.56757°E	
68	The Lumpini 24		187.4 m	615 ft	54	2017	Khlong Toei	13.72273°N 100.56614°E	
69=	Abdulrahim Place		187 m	614 ft	34	1996	Bang Rak	13.72742°N 100.53855°E	
69=	United Center		187 m	614 ft	55	1995	Bang Rak	13.72711°N 100.53160°E	
69=	St. Regis Hotel & Residences Bangkok		187 m	614 ft	47	2011	Pathum Wan	13.73985°N 100.53998°E	
72	Park 24 Tower B		186.2 m	611 ft	51	2018	Khlong Toei	13.72574°N 100.56551°E	Also known as Park Origin Phrom Prong.
73	Park 24 Tower A		186 m	610 ft	50	2018	Khlong Toei	13.72464°N 100.56597°E	Also known as Park Origin Phrom Prong.
74	Noble Ploen Chit Tower B		185 m	607 ft	52	2016	Pathum Wan	13.74377°N 100.54855°E	
75	AIA Ratchada 2		183.50 m	602 ft	34	2025	Huai Khwang		
75=	Dusit Central Park Office		182.6 m	599ft	43	2025	Bang Rak		
76	Sathorn Square Office Tower		181.4 m	595 ft	41	2011	Bang Rak	13.72235°N 100.52930°E	
77=	Whizdom Essence Sukhumvit		180 m	591 ft	50	2019	Phra Khanong	13.68604°N 100.61241°E	
77=	Bhiraj Tower at EmQuartier		180 m	591 ft	45	2015	Watthana	13.73117°N 100.56973°E	
77=	The ESSE at Singha Complex		180 m	591 ft	39	2019	Huai Khwang	13.74808°N 100.56379°E	
77=	Pier 111		180 m	591 ft	35	2023	Pathum Wan	13.74833°N 100.54245°E	
77=	Tipco Tower		180 m	591 ft	40	1996	Phaya Thai		
78=	Dusit Thani Bangkok Hotel		179 m	587 ft	39	2024	Bang Rak		
82	RHYTHM Phahon-Ari		177.8 m	583 ft	54	2014	Phaya Thai	13.78888°N 100.54520°E	
83	Grande Centre Point Terminal 21		177.4 m	582 ft	30	2011	Watthana	13.73774°N 100.56061°E	
84	Kasikorn Bank Head Office		177 m	581 ft	42	1995	Rat Burana	13.68038°N 100.51481°E	the antenna extend to 208 m
85	Banyan Tree Residences Riverside Bangkok		177 m	581 ft	45	2019	Khlong San	13.73273°N 100.50999°E	
86	The Esse Sukhumvit 36		176 m	579 ft	43	2020	Khlong Toei	13.72415°N 100.57773°E	
87=	Reference Sathorn-Wongwianyai		175 m	574 ft	51	2024	Thonburi		
87=	Exchange Tower		175 m	574 ft	46	2004	Khlong Toei	13.73552°N 100.56161°E	
89	Sathorn House		174.2 m	572 ft	50	1999	Bang Rak	13.72016°N 100.52127°E	
90	Q Sukhumvit		174 m	571 ft	40	2018	Khlong Toei	13.74036°N 100.55530°E	
91=	Ideo Q Sukhumvit 36		173 m	568 ft	47	2020	Khlong Toei	13.72115°N 100.57652°E	
91=	The Monument Thong Lo		173 m	568 ft	45	2019	Watthana	13.74177°N 100.58550°E	
91=	The Hansar Hotel & Residence		173 m	567 ft	43	2011	Pathum Wan	13.74039°N 100.54130°E	
94=	Hyde Heritage Thonglor		172 m	564 ft	45	2022	Watthana	13.72240°N 100.58193°E	
94=	The Line Sukhumvit 101		172 m	563 ft	37	2019	Phra Khanong	13.69213°N 100.60796°E	
96=	Column Tower		170 m	558 ft	42	2006	Khlong Toei	13.73319°N 100.56062°E	
96=	Park Hyatt Bangkok at Central Embassy		170 m	558 ft	37	2016	Pathum Wan	13.74389°N 100.54699°E	
96=	Conner Ratchathewi		170 m	556 ft	38	2022	Ratchathewi	13.75387°N 100.52919°E	
96=	EXAT Building		170 m	556 ft	28	2020	Huai Khwang	13.75053°N 100.56809°E	Expressway Authority Building
100	UOB Plaza		169.7 m	557 ft	31	2022	Khlong Toei	13.72940°N 100.57026°E	
101=	Skyrise Avenue Tower G		169 m	554 ft	49	2024	Phra Khanong	13.68363°N 100.69458°E	
101=	66 Tower		169 m	553 ft	28	2021	Bang Na	13.68202°N 100.61001°E	
103=	Q Asoke		168 m	551 ft	41	2015	Ratchathewi	13.74864°N 100.56299°E	
103=	Ashton Asok-Rama 9 Omega Tower		168 m	552 ft	49	2020	Din Daeng	13.75540°N 100.56454°E	
103=	KnightsBridge Prime Sathorn		168 m	552 ft	43	2019	Sathon	13.71694°N 100.53361°E	
103=	Wish Signature II Midtown		168 m	551 ft	40	2023	Ratchathewi	13.75118°N 100.53509°E	
103=	AIA East Gateway		168 m	550 ft	33	2023	Bang Na		
103=	Conrad Bangkok Sukhumvit Queen's Park		168 m	550 ft	37	2026	Khlong Toei		
108	Hyde Sukhumvit 13		167.5 m	550 ft	40	2014	Watthana	13.74067°N 100.55729°E	
109=	Emporium Suites		167 m	548 ft	46	1998	Khlong Toei	13.73040°N 100.56887°E	
109=	Hyde Sukhumvit 11		167 m	548 ft	39	2018	Watthana	13.74396°N 100.55640°E	
109=	One Bangkok Tower 5		167 m	548 ft	36	2024	Pathum wan	13.72810°N 100.54725°E	
109=	Somkhid Tower at The Park Chidlom		167 m	548 ft	35	2007	Pathum Wan	13.74758°N 100.54566°E	
109=	Windshell Naradhiwas		167 m	548 ft	28	2019	Sathon	13.70615°N 100.53885°E	
114=	StarView Tower A		166 m	545 ft	44	2015	Bang Kho Laem	13.68816°N 100.51824°E	
114=	Supalai Prima Riva		166 m	544 ft	47	2015	Yan Nawa	13.68871°N 100.54914°E	
114=	Tait Sathorn 12		166 m	544 ft	40	2023	Bang Rak	13.72258°N 100.52620°E	
114=	SOLACE Phahol Pradipat		166 m	544 ft	50	2026	Phaya Thai		
117	The Sukhothai Residences		165.1 m	542 ft	41	2012	Sathon	13.72155°N 100.54149°E	
118=	Noble Ploen Chit Tower C		165 m	541 ft	47	2016	Pathum Wan	13.74368°N 100.54867°E	
118=	Skyrise Avenue Tower D		165 m	542 ft	48	2024	Phra Khanong	13.68339°N 100.60725°E	
118=	Skyrise Avenue Tower E		165 m	542 ft	48	2024	Phra Khanong	13.68318°N 100.60694°E	
118=	Sapphire Rama 3		165 m	542 ft	46	2023	Yan Nawa	13.67394°N 100.53835°E	
118=	V44 Tower		165 m	542 ft	44	2025	Huai Khwang		
118=	Cyber World Tower 2		165 m	541 ft	48	2008	Huai Khwang	13.77028°N 100.57366°E	
118=	The Waterford Diamond		165 m	541 ft	47	1999	Khlong Toei	13.72709°N 100.57354°E	
118=	Italthai Tower		165 m	541 ft	44	1997	Huai Khwang	13.74673°N 100.57375°E	
118=	Amanta Lumpini		165 m	541 ft	44	2010	Sathon	13.72329°N 100.55122°E	
118=	The Aguston Tower B		165 m	541 ft	35	2010	Khlong Toei	13.72528°N 100.56427°E	
118=	Bright Wongwian Yai		165 m	541 ft	46	2017	Thonburi	13.71971°N 100.49055°E	
129	RS Tower		164.9 m	541 ft	41	1996	Din Daeng	13.76748°N 100.57061°E	
130=	Rhythm Charoenkrung Pavilion		164 m	538 ft	44	2022	Bang Kho Laem	13.70976°N 100.51178°E	
130=	The Lofts Silom		164 m	537 ft	37	2020	Bang Rak	13.72349°N 100.52237°E	
132=	Kimpton Maa-Lai Hotel, Sindhorn Village		163 m	536 ft	39	2019	Pathum Wan	13.73775°N 100.54344°E	
132=	Gems Tower		163 m	536 ft	39	1994	Bang Rak	13.72412°N 100.51679°E	
134	Fullerton Sukhumvit		162.6 m	533 ft	37	2006	Watthana	13.72216°N 100.58225°E	
135=	Kronos Office Tower		162 m	530 ft	26	2021	Bang Rak	13.72473°N 100.53866°E	
135=	Q Chidlom-Phetchaburi		162 m	530 ft	42	2018	Ratchathewi	13.74936°N 100.54386°E	
135=	Samyan Mitrtown Office Tower		162 m	530 ft	31	2019	Pathum Wan	13.73354°N 100.52818°E	
135=	Oka Haus Sukhumvit 36		162 m	530 ft	47	2020	Khlong Toei	13.71599°N 100.57487°E	
135=	Aspire Huai Khwang		162 m	530 ft	35	2026	Huai Khwang		
139=	O-NES		161 m	528 ft	29	2021	Khlong Toei	13.74043°N 100.55495°E	
139=	Sky Walk Residences		161 m	528 ft	50	2012	Watthana	13.71477°N 100.59344°E	
139=	Park Origin Ratchathewi		161 m	527 ft	41	2023	Ratchathewi	13.75450°N 100.52896°E	
142	PYNE		160.9 m	528 ft	44	2012	Ratchathewi	13.75224°N 100.53099°E	
143	Q. House Lumpini		160.3 m	526 ft	38	2006	Sathon	13.72504°N 100.54399°E	
144=	GMM Grammy Place		160 m	525 ft	43	1999	Watthana	13.74338°N 100.56250°E	
144=	Vanit 2 Building		160 m	525 ft	42	1994	Ratchathewi	13.74941°N 100.54809°E	
144=	Interlink Tower		160 m	525 ft	40	1995	Bang Na	13.66387°N 100.65134°E	
144=	Bank of Ayudhya Head Office		160 m	525 ft	39	1996	Yan Nawa	13.67712°N 100.54703°E	
144=	U Chu Liang Building		160 m	525 ft	40	1998	Bang Rak	13.72731°N 100.54050°E	
144=	Thani Noppharat Building		160 m	525 ft	37	2017	Din Daeng	13.77068°N 100.55396°E	also known as Bangkok City Hall 2
144=	Whizdom Inspire Sukhumvit		160 m	524 ft	46	2020	Phra Khanong	13.68595°N 100.61115°E	part of Whizdom 101 complex
151=	Skyrise Avenue Tower F		159 m	522 ft	46	2024	Phra Khanong	13.68373°N 100.60793°E	
151=	Nara 9		159 m	522 ft	40	2017	Sathon	13.71801°N 100.53317°E	
153=	The Emporio Place East Tower		158 m	518 ft	42	2009	Khlong Toei	13.72293°N 100.56731°E	
153=	Q Langsuan		158 m	518 ft	39	2010	Pathum Wan	13.73935°N 100.54256°E	
153=	Grand Langsuan Condominium		158 m	518 ft	46	1998	Pathum Wan	13.73973°N 100.54265°E	
156=	KnightsBridge Prime Onnut		157.6 m	517 ft	47	2020	Watthana	13.71043°N 100.60221°E	
156=	T-One Building		157.5 m	517 ft	29	2019	Khlong Toei	13.72253°N 100.58044°E	
158=	Niche Mono Ramkhamhaeng		157 m	515 ft	37	2023	Huai Khwang	13.76109°N 100.63730°E	
158=	Royce Private Residences Tower I		157 m	514 ft	39	2012	Watthana	13.74057°N 100.56607°E	
158=	Chapter Charoen Nakhon 1		157 m	514 ft	46	2022	Khlong San	13.71424°N 100.50430°E	
158=	Chamchuri Square		157 m	515 ft	40	2008	Pathum Wan	13.73290°N 100.53115°E	
158=	The Lofts Asoke		157 m	514 ft	37	2018	Watthana	13.74696°N 100.56268°E	
158=	Langsuan Ville		157 m	514 ft	42	1997	Pathum Wan	13.73989°N 100.54296°E	
158=	Interchange 21		157 m	515 ft	34	2008	Watthana	13.73662°N 100.56204°E	
165=	G Tower		155 m	509 ft	40	2017	Huai Khwang	13.75721°N 100.56575°E	Also known as Rama IX Square Tower.
165=	LAVIQ Sukhumvit 57		155 m	510 ft	33	2019	Watthana	13.72473°N 100.58082°E	
165=	Circle Condominium Tower II		155 m	507 ft	43	2011	Ratchathewi	13.74958°N 100.55585°E	
165=	333 Riverside Tower B		155 m	507 ft	42	2016	Bang Sue	13.80735°N 100.51973°E	
165=	ICS Tower		155 m	507 ft	34	2022^{[UC]}	Khlong San	13.72633°N 100.50879°E	Hilton Garden Inn hotel, Iconsiam
165=	AIA Capital Center		155 m	507 ft	42	2014	Din Daeng	13.76489°N 100.56820°E	
165=	Ashton Asok-Rama 9 Alpha Tower		155 m	507 ft	45	2020	Din Daeng	13.75561°N 100.56409°E	
165=	ANIL Sathorn 12		155 m	507 ft	42	2022	Bang Rak	13.72131°N 100.52588°E	
173	Rosewood Bangkok		154.4 m	507 ft	32	2019	Pathum Wan	13.74337°N 100.54896°E	
174=	C Ekkamai		154 m	504 ft	44	2018	Watthana	13.74022°N 100.58970°E	
174=	Life Asoke-Rama 9		154 m	504 ft	46	2020	Ratchathewi	13.75514°N 100.56387°E	
174=	RHYTHM Sathorn South Building		154 m	504 ft	41	2015	Sathon	13.71667°N 100.51661°E	
174=	SHUSH Ratchathewi		154 m	504 ft	32	2026	Ratchathewi		
177	WISH Signature Midtown Siam		153.8 m	504 ft	47	2018	Ratchathewi	13.75202°N 100.53466°E	
178=	Vanissa Building		153 m	501 ft	27	2022^{[UC]}	Pathum Wan	13.74590°N 100.54434°E	
178=	Ideal 24		153 m	501 ft	41	2008	Khlong Toei	13.72360°N 100.56703°E	
178=	The Residence Sukhumvit 24 Tower II		153 m	502 ft	41	2008	Khlong Toei	13.72348°N 100.56608°E	
178=	EDGE Sukhumvit 23		153 m	501 ft	35	2016	Watthana	13.73679°N 100.56315°E	
182	Siamese Tower C Rama 9		152.85 m	501 ft	29	2024	Huai Khwang	13.75587°N 100.58383°E	
183=	Villa Rachatewi		152 m	499 ft	43	2010	Ratchathewi	13.75447°N 100.53269°E	
183=	Energy Complex Building I		152 m	499 ft	36	2009	Chatuchak	13.81959°N 100.55732°E	
185	The River North Tower		151.8 m	498 ft	45	2012	Khlong San	13.72134°N 100.51017°E	
186	Park 24 Tower C		151.6 m	497 ft	41	2018	Khlong Toei	13.73247°N 100.58456°E	Also known as Park Origin Phrom Prong.
187=	Baiyoke Tower I		151 m	495 ft	42	1987	Ratchathewi	13.75296°N 100.53950°E	The tallest building in Bangkok from 1987 to 1993.
187=	The Saint Residences Tower I		151 m	495 ft	41	2018	Chatuchak	13.81152°N 100.56058°E	
187=	The Saint Residences Tower II		151 m	495 ft	41	2018	Chatuchak	13.81152°N 100.56058°E	
187=	The Saint Residences Tower III		151 m	495 ft	41	2018	Chatuchak	13.81152°N 100.56058°E	
187=	The Peninsula Bangkok Hotel		151 m	495 ft	40	1998	Khlong San	13.72318°N 100.51082°E	
187=	S-Oasis Tower		151 m	495 ft	35	2022	Chatuchak	13.80760°N 100.55929°E	
193=	The Line Phahon-Pradipat		150 m	492 ft	43	2017	Phaya Thai	13.79107°N 100.54609°E	
193=	Belle Grand Rama 9 Tower A1		150 m	492 ft	43	2013	Huai Khwang	13.75971°N 100.56959°E	Also known as Belle Avenue Tower. Height 150.3m
193=	Chapter Charoen Nakhon 2		150 m	492 ft	43	2022	Khlong San	13.71424°N 100.50430°E	
193=	Belle Grand Rama 9 Tower D1		150 m	492 ft	43	2013	Huai Khwang	13.75971°N 100.56959°E	Also known as Belle Avenue Tower. Height 150.3m
193=	The Line Jatujak-Mochit		150 m	492 ft	43	2017	Chatuchak	13.80596°N 100.55655°E	
193=	333 Riverside Tower A		150 m	492 ft	41	2016	Bang Sue	13.80701°N 100.51961°E	
193=	Noble Around Ari X		150 m	492 ft	39	2023	Phaya Thai		
193=	Wind Ratchayothin		150 m	492 ft	37	2010	Chatuchak	13.82883°N 100.56608°E	
193=	BTS Visionary Park Tower 1		150 m	492 ft	36	2025	Chatuchak		
193=	BTS Visionary Park Tower 2		150 m	492 ft	36	2025	Chatuchak		
193=	The Infinity		150 m	492 ft	40	2008	Bang Rak	13.72314°N 100.52923°E	
(211)	The Crest Park Residences		150 m	492 ft	36	2022	Chatuchak	13.81426°N 100.56083°E	

=== Tallest buildings by function ===
This lists the tallest buildings in Bangkok by their respective functions—office, hotel, residential and mixed-use—based on standard height measurement.

Rank	Name	Height	Floors	Function	Completion
1	Magnolias Waterfront Residences Iconsiam	318 m (1,043 ft)	70	Residential	2018
2	King Power MahaNakhon	314 m (1,030 ft)	79	Mixed-use	2016
3	Baiyoke Tower II	309 m (1,014 ft)	85	Hotel	1997
4	One City Centre	276 m (906 ft)	61	Office	2022

== Tallest under construction or proposed ==
=== Under construction ===
List of buildings taller than 150 metres (495 feet) that are under construction within the Bangkok Metropolitan Administration area as of September 2026.

Rank	Name	Height		Floors	Year	Location	Notes
1	Signature Tower	437 m	1435 ft	92	On Hold	Pathum Wan	
2	Soontareeya	295.2 m	969 ft	64	2026	Pathum Wan	
3	Witthayu Condominium Tower 2	295 m	968 ft	71	2028	Pathum Wan	
4	Central Embassy Phase 2	234.80 m	733 ft	56	2030	Pathum Wan	
5	Bangkok Mall Tower	219 m	718 ft	42	2028	Bang Na	
6	Witthayu Condominium Tower 1	214 m	702 ft	52	2028	Pathum Wan	
7	BDMS Wellness Langsuan	208 m	676 ft	46	2030	Pathum Wan	
8	Obayashi X Sahapat Ratchadamri	194.1 m	639 ft	36	2029	Pathum Wan	
9	Central Siam Square	189.60 m	622 ft	42	2030	Pathumwan	
10	CU Block 33 Tower A	184.1 m	604 ft	50	2025	Pathum Wan	
11	Platinum Square	176 m	593 ft	48	2028	Ratchathewi	
12	SC Residences	173.4 m	590 ft	37	2028	Pathumwan	
13	Xelf By Sansiri	166.8 m	571 ft	37	2028	Khlong Toei	
14	LOVE CHAROEN NAKHON	165.20 m	570 ft	44	2028	Khlong San	
15	Boonmitr Silom	163.6 m	566 ft	34	2027	Bang Rak	
16	CU Block 33 Tower B	160.9 m	561 ft	43	2025	Pathum Wan	
17	Nue Epic Rama 9 Tower 1	159 m	522 ft	47	2028	Din Daeng	
18	Nue Epic Rama 9 Tower 2	159 m	522 ft	47	2028	Din Daeng	
19	LIFE Sukhumvit Rama 4	159.15 m	522 ft	47	2028	Khlong Toei	
20	CL Residences	156 m	512 ft	37	2028	Pathum Wan	
21	The Reference Ekkamai	151.5 m	498 ft	44	2027	Watthana	
22	The BASE Wongsawang	150 m	495 ft	40	2027	Bang Sue	

=== Proposed ===
List of significant skyscrapers that will rise more than 200 metres, including those that received environmental approvals, cancelled or never built.

Rank	Building	Location	Height		Floors	Status
1	Rama IX Super Tower	Huai Khwang	615 m	2,018 ft	125	Cancelled
2	Makkasan Complex	Huai Khwang	550 m	1,800 ft	120	Proposed
3	Asiatique Iconic Tower	Bang Ko Laem	450 m	1,476 ft	100	Proposed
4	Chao Phraya Gateway	Khlong Teoi	400 m+	1,312 ft	110	Proposed
5	Fragrant Sukhumvit 36	Wattana	396 m	1,298 ft	68	EIA Approved
6	MCOT Complex	Huai Khwang	369 m	1,210 ft	65	Cancelled
7	Metropolis International	Khlong Teoi	359 m	1,178 ft	103	Cancelled
8	Hyde Riverbay Charoen Nakhon	Bang Ko Laem	290 m	951 ft	68	Proposed
9	Residences at Rajadamri	Pathum Wan	286 m	938 ft	53	Proposed
10	The Parq Phase 3 Office Tower	Khlong Toei	268 m	880 ft	53	Proposed
11	Treasure Island Tower I	Yan Nawa	266 m	873 ft	78	Proposed
12	One Bangkok C5	Pathum Wan	251 m	824 ft	65	Proposed
13	Treasure Island Tower II	Yan Nawa	249 m	817 ft	73	Proposed
14	991 Thonglor	Watthana	244 m	800 ft	60	Cancelled
15	Treasure Island Tower III	Yan Nawa	232 m	761 ft	68	Proposed
16	Treasure Island Tower IV	Yan Nawa	232 m	761 ft	68	Proposed
17	Whizdom Episode Sam Yan	Pathum Wan	228 m	748 ft	55	EIA Approved
18	Chatrium City	Bang Na	220 m	721 ft	51	Proposed
19	Muniq Charoen Krung	Charoen Krung	210 m	710 ft	49	Proposed
20	Ivy Sukhumvit 18	Khlong Teoi	154.55 m	695 ft	37	Proposed

== Districts with the most skyscrapers ==
This list ranks the districts in the Bangkok Metropolitan Administration Area with buildings taller than 150 metres.

	District	≥150 m	≥200 m	≥250 m	≥300 m	Total
1	Pathum Wan	32	11	1	0	32
2	Khlong Toei	25	0	0	0	25
3	Watthana	25	6	0	0	25
4	Bang Rak	20	7	1	1	20
5	Sathorn	16	4	1	1	16
6	Ratchathewi	18	4	1	1	18
7	Huai Khwang	17	3	0	0	17
8	Khlong San	11	3	3	1	11
9	Chatuchak	11	0	0	0	11
10	Phra Khanong	7	0	0	0	7
11	Yan Nawa	6	2	1	0	6
12	Din Daeng	5	0	0	0	5
13	Bang Kho Laem	5	2	1	0	5
14	Phaya Thai	5	0	0	0	5
15	Bang Na	3	0	0	0	3
16	Thonburi	2	0	0	0	2
17	Bang Sue	2	0	0	0	2
18	Rat Burana	1	1	0	0	1

== Tallest buildings by district ==
The tallest skyscrapers in selected districts of the Bangkok Metropolitan Administration Area.

Rank	Name	Height	Floors	District	Completion
1	Magnolias Waterfront Residences Iconsiam	315 m (1,033 ft)	70	Khlong San	2018
2	King Power MahaNakhon	314 m (1,030 ft)	79	Bang Rak	2016
3	Baiyoke Tower II	304 m (997 ft)	85	Ratchathewi	1997
4	Four Seasons Private Residences Bangkok	299.5 m (983 ft)	73	Sathorn	2019
5	One City Centre	275.8 m (905 ft)	61	Pathum Wan	2022
6	KingBridge Tower	260 m (853 ft)	43	Yan Nawa	2024
7	Canapaya Residences	253.3 m (831 ft)	57	Bang Ko Laem	2019
8=	One9Five Asoke-Rama IX Tower 1	248 m (813 ft)	61	Huai Khwang	2021
8=	One9Five Asoke-Rama IX Tower 2	248 m (813 ft)	61	Huai Khwang	2021
9	The ESSE Asoke	236.8 m (777 ft)	53	Watthana	2019
10=	Millennium Residence Tower II	199.3 m (653 ft)	53	Khlong Toei	2009
10=	Millennium Residence Tower III	199.3 m (653 ft)	53	Khlong Toei	2009
11	The Issara Lad Phrao	188 m (617 ft)	51	Chatuchak	2011
12=	Whizdom Essence Sukhumvit	180 m (591 ft)	50	Phra Khanong	2018
12=	Tipco Tower	180 m (591 ft)	53	Phaya Thai	2013
14	Kasikornbank Headquarters	177 m (581 ft)	42	Rat Burana	1995
15	Reference Sathorn-Wongwianyai	175 m (557 ft)	51	Thonburi	2024
16	66 Tower	169 m (551 ft)	28	Bang Na	2021
17	Ashton Asoke-Rama IX	168 m (551 ft)	49	Din Daeng	2020
18	333 Riverside Tower B	155 m (507 ft)	42	Bang Sue	2016

== Timeline of tallest buildings ==
This is a list of buildings that in the past held, or currently holds the title of tallest building in Bangkok.

Name	Photo	Street address	Years as tallest	Height m / ft	Floors	Notes
American International Tower		181 Surawong Road, Bang Rak	1964—1968		11	
Dusit Thani Bangkok		946 Rama IV Road, Bang Rak	1968—1978	82 m (269 ft)	23	Demolished in 2020. Site to be redeveloped as part of Dusit Central Park Project.
Chokchai Tower		690 Sukhumvit Road, Watthana	1978—1981		26	Demolished in 2017
Bangkok Bank Head Office		333 Silom Road, Bang Rak	1981—1987	134 m (440 ft)	35	
Baiyoke Tower I		130 Ratchaprarop Road, Ratchathewi	1987—1993	150 m (492 ft)	43	
Sinn Sathorn Tower		77/8 Krung Thon Buri Road, Khlong San	1993—1996	195 m (640 ft)	44	
Jewelry Trade Center		919/1 Silom Road, Bang Rak, Bangkok 10500	1996—1997	221 m (725 ft)	59	
Baiyoke Tower II		222 Ratchaprarop Road, Ratchathewi	1997—2016	304 m (997 ft)	85	
King Power MahaNakhon		114 Naradhiwas Rajanagarindra Road, Bang Rak	2016—2018	314 m (1,030 ft)	79	
Magnolias Waterfront Residences at Iconsiam		259 Charoen Nakhon Road, Khlong San	2018—present	315 m (1,033 ft)	70	

== See also ==
- List of tallest buildings
- List of tallest buildings in Asia
- List of cities with the most skyscrapers
- List of tallest structures in Thailand
