= Embassy of Italy, Bangkok =

- Address: 87 Witthayu Rd, Pathum Wan, Bangkok 10330, Thailand
- Ambassador: Paolo Dionisi

The Embassy of Italy in Bangkok (Thai: สถานเอกอัครราชทูตอิตาลี ประจำประเทศไทย; Italian: Ambasciata d'Italia a Bangkok) is the diplomatic mission of Italy in Thailand. It is located in All Seasons Place on Wireless Road, near the United States and Dutch embassies.

The current Italian Ambassador to Thailand is Paolo Dionisi.

== History ==
On 25 April 2024, a new Italy Visa Application Centre in Bangkok opened at All Seasons Place.

In July 2026, the Embassy issued a statement of apology following an altercation between Italian students on a tour group and a Thai citizen on the BTS SkyTrain.
