= Four Seasons Private Residences Bangkok at Chao Phraya River =

Residential skyscraper in Bangkok, Thailand

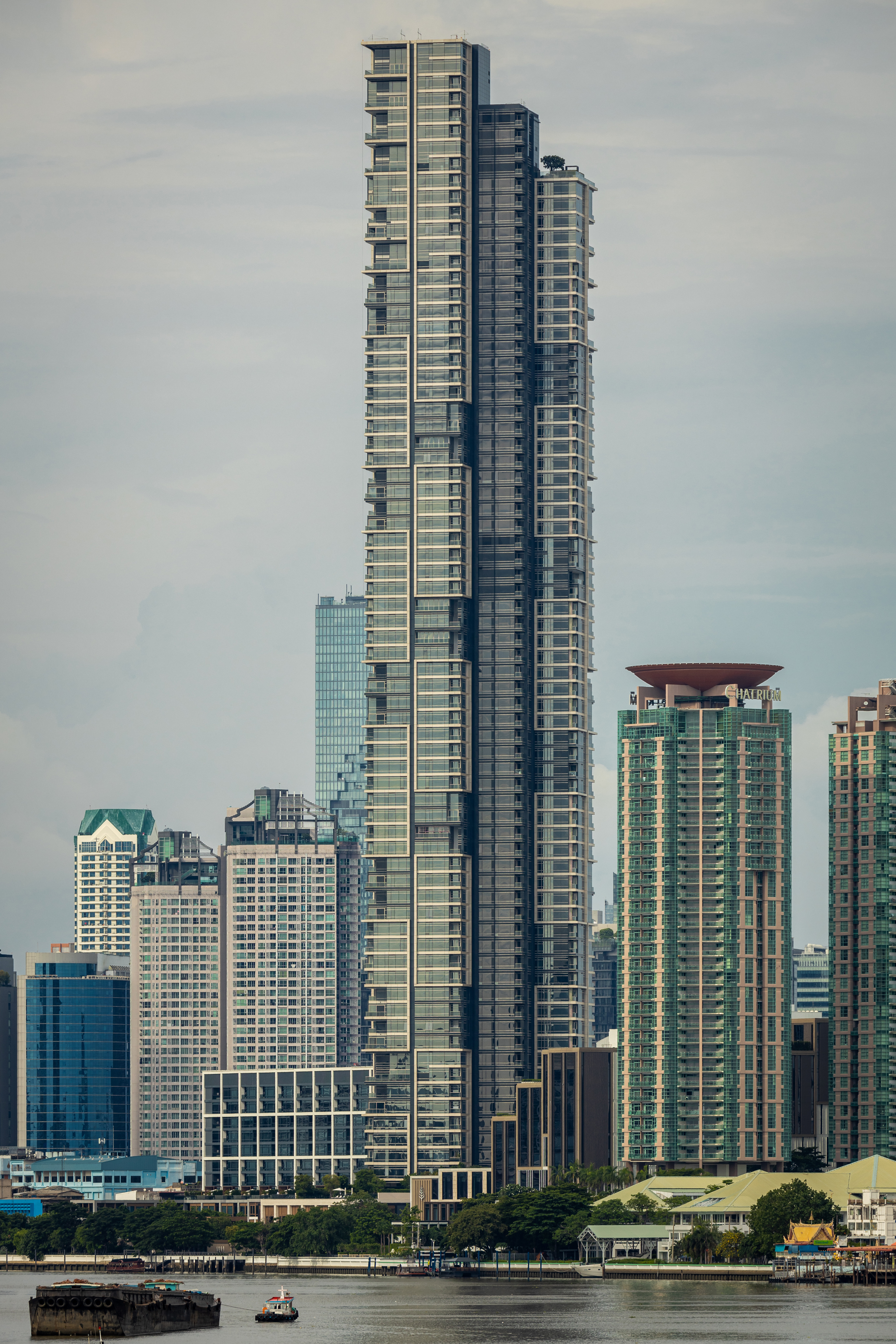
- Four Seasons Private Residences in 2021

General information
- Status: Completed
- Type: Residential
- Location: 300 Charoen Krung Rd, Yannawa, Sathon, Bangkok, Thailand
- Coordinates: 13.71257°N 100.51030°E
- Construction started: 2015
- Completed: 2019

Height
- Height: 299.5 m (983 ft)

Design and construction
- Developer: Country Group Development PCL

Website
- chaophrayaestate.com

Four Seasons Private Residences Bangkok at Chao Phraya River is a 73-floor residential skyscraper in the Sathon District in Bangkok, Thailand. The tower has a total structural height of 299.5 m (983 ft).

== Info ==
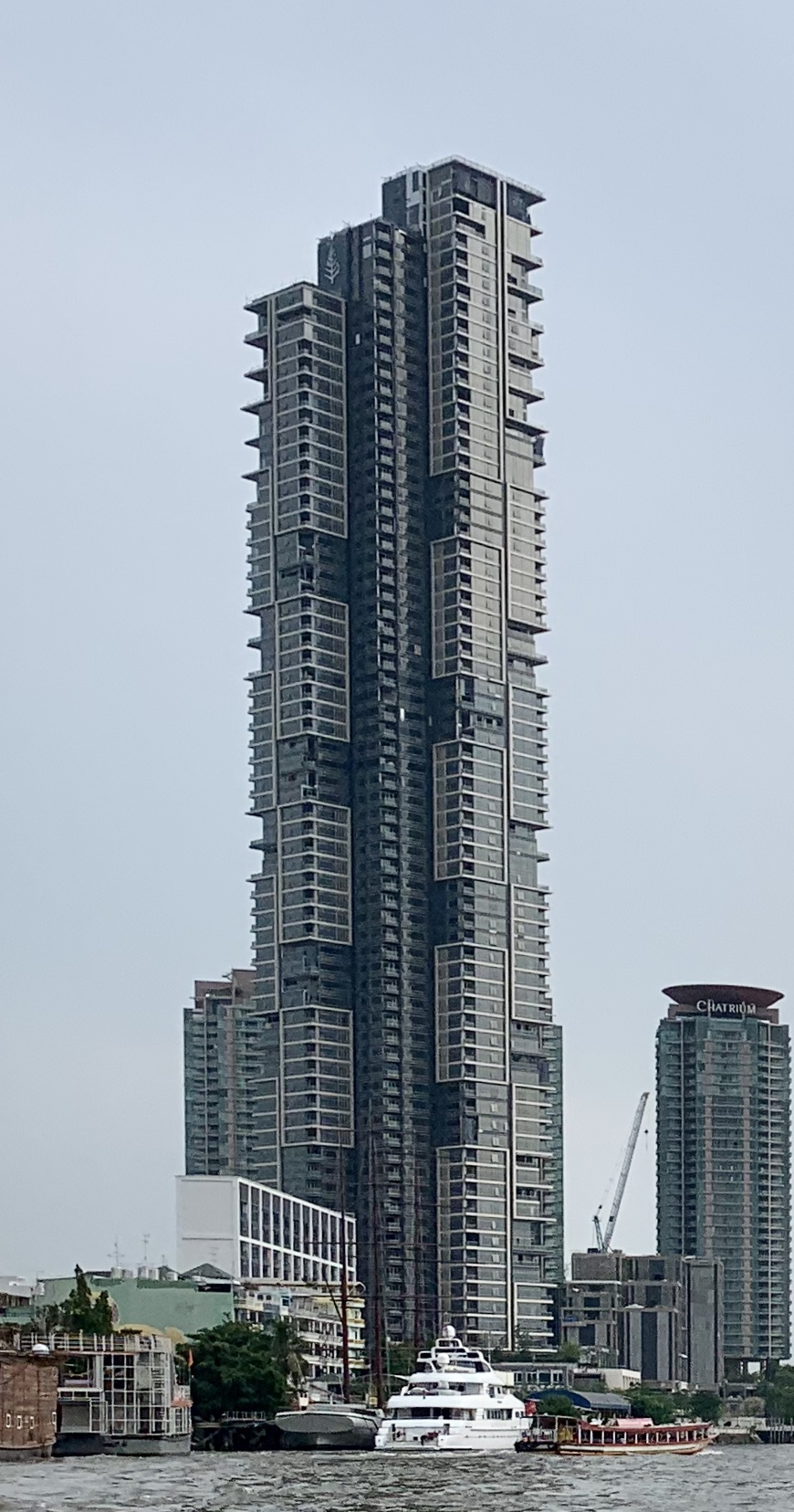
Side of building viewed from river.

The building is the 4th tallest building in Bangkok and Thailand, the 13th tallest building in Southeast Asia, and the 23rd tallest residential building in the world.

It has a waterfront view of Chao Phraya River and stands out among other residential buildings for its height. The architectural style is modern and it has a unique shape. The tower is owned by Four Seasons Hotels and Resorts and is designed to be a permanent or temporary living space for people. The construction material used was mainly glass and concrete.

It is one of the newer buildings in Bangkok which is another reason why it is easily noticeable due to the facade.

The building is part of a residential boom in Bangkok as more tourists and citizens come to the city. It has been called "one of the last golden sites in Bangkok," due to the huge population and little room to build structures.

The project was worth 32 billion baht. As of September 2020, 70% of units were already sold, despite that point in time also being the COVID-19 pandemic.

== See also ==
- List of tallest buildings in Bangkok
- List of tallest buildings in Southeast Asia
- List of tallest residential buildings
