= W Bangkok =

Hotel in Bangkok, Thailand

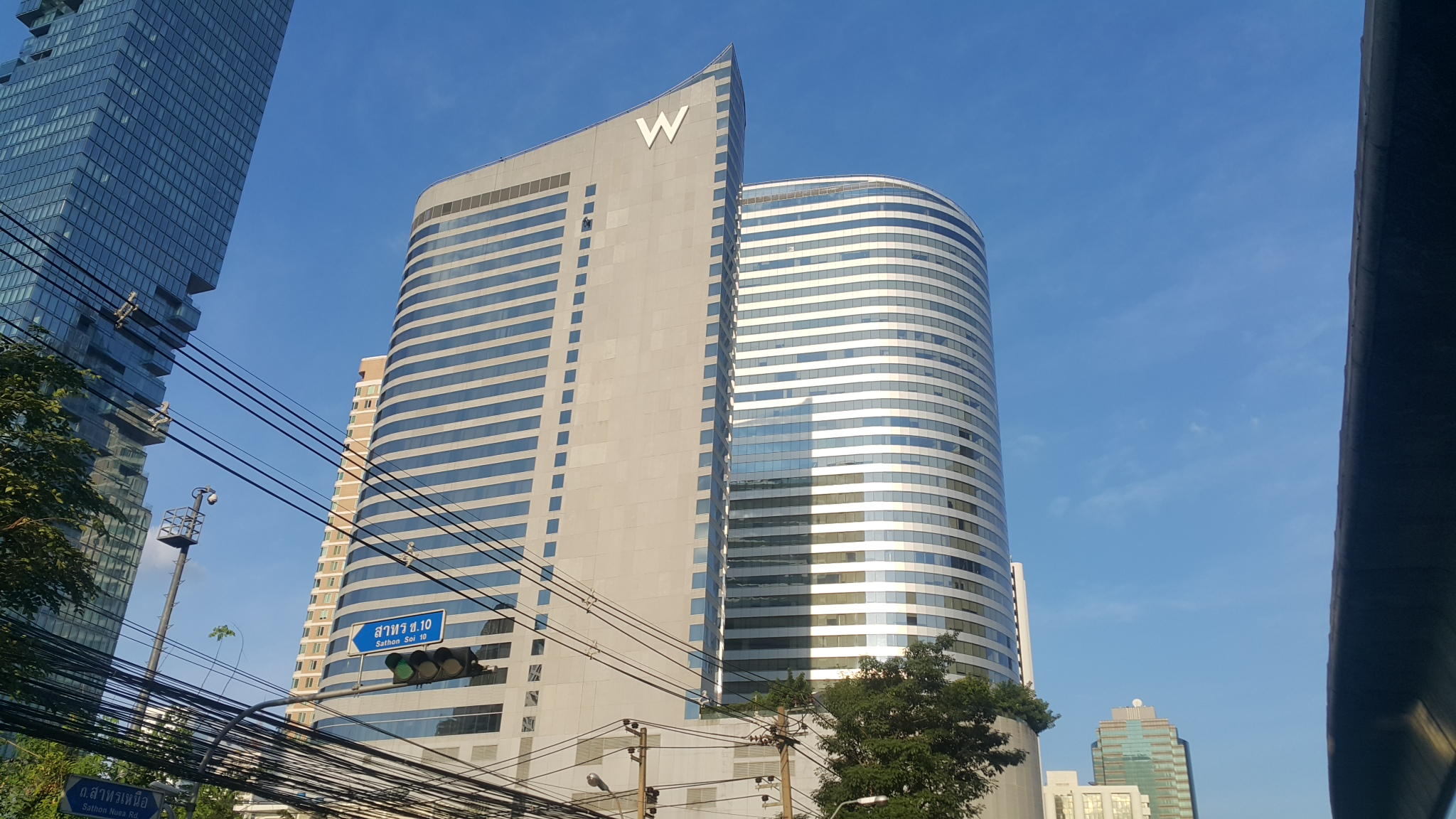
- Interactive map of the W Bangkok area

General information
- Location: 106 Sathorn Road, Silom, Bangkok 10500, Thailand
- Coordinates: 13.722209°N 100.528904°E
- Opening: 2012; 14 years ago
- Management: Marriott International

Technical details
- Floor count: 31

Design and construction
- Architect: AvroKO
- Other designers: SODA(Thailand): interior design

Other information
- Number of rooms: 403
- Number of suites: 34
- Number of restaurants: 8

Website
- www.marriott.com/hotels/travel/bkkwb-w-bangkok/

W Bangkok is a five-star luxury hotel in Bangkok, marketed under the brand W Hotels.

== Hotel Overview ==
W Bangkok officially opened on December 7, 2012. It was designed by P&T Group (Thailand) with an interior design by S.O.D.A (Thailand) and Avroko. The building has 31 floors and 402 guest rooms. It is located on North Sathorn road, opposite the Empire Tower and an office tower. W Bangkok is connected with The House on Sathorn (Sathorn Mansion), which serves as a dining and entertainment venue for the hotel.

== The House on Sathorn ==
The House on Sathorn was built in 1889 during the reign of King Rama V. It was originally owned by Luang Sathorn Rajayutka, a wealthy Chinese businessman who developed Sathon Canal. In 1920s, the home was converted into The Hotel Royal. From 1948 to 1999, it served as the Russian embassy. In the 2000s, the mansion underwent renovation as part of W Bangkok. In 2015, this 127-year-old mansion officially opened as The House on Sathorn, a new dining venue in Bangkok

== Awards ==
- BEST DESIGN HOTEL WORLDWIDE 2015 – Hotel of the Year Awards
- TOP 10 HOTELS IN BANGKOK 2015 – Conde Nast Traveller Reader’s Choice Award
