= The Esse Asoke =

The ESSE Asoke
- The Esse Asoke in 2026

General information
- Status: Completed
- Location: Asoke Montri Road, Bangkok
- Coordinates: 13.743113°N 100.561813°E
- Construction started: 2016
- Completed: 2019

Height
- Height: 237 metres (778 ft)

Technical details
- Floor count: 55

Design and construction
- Developer: Singha Estate Public Company

The ESSE Asoke is a skyscraper in Bangkok, Thailand that stands at 237 metres (778 ft) tall. It was completed in 2019. It is a residential tower with 419 individual residences.
