= Sathon Mansion =

Historic building in Bangkok

- บ้านสาทร
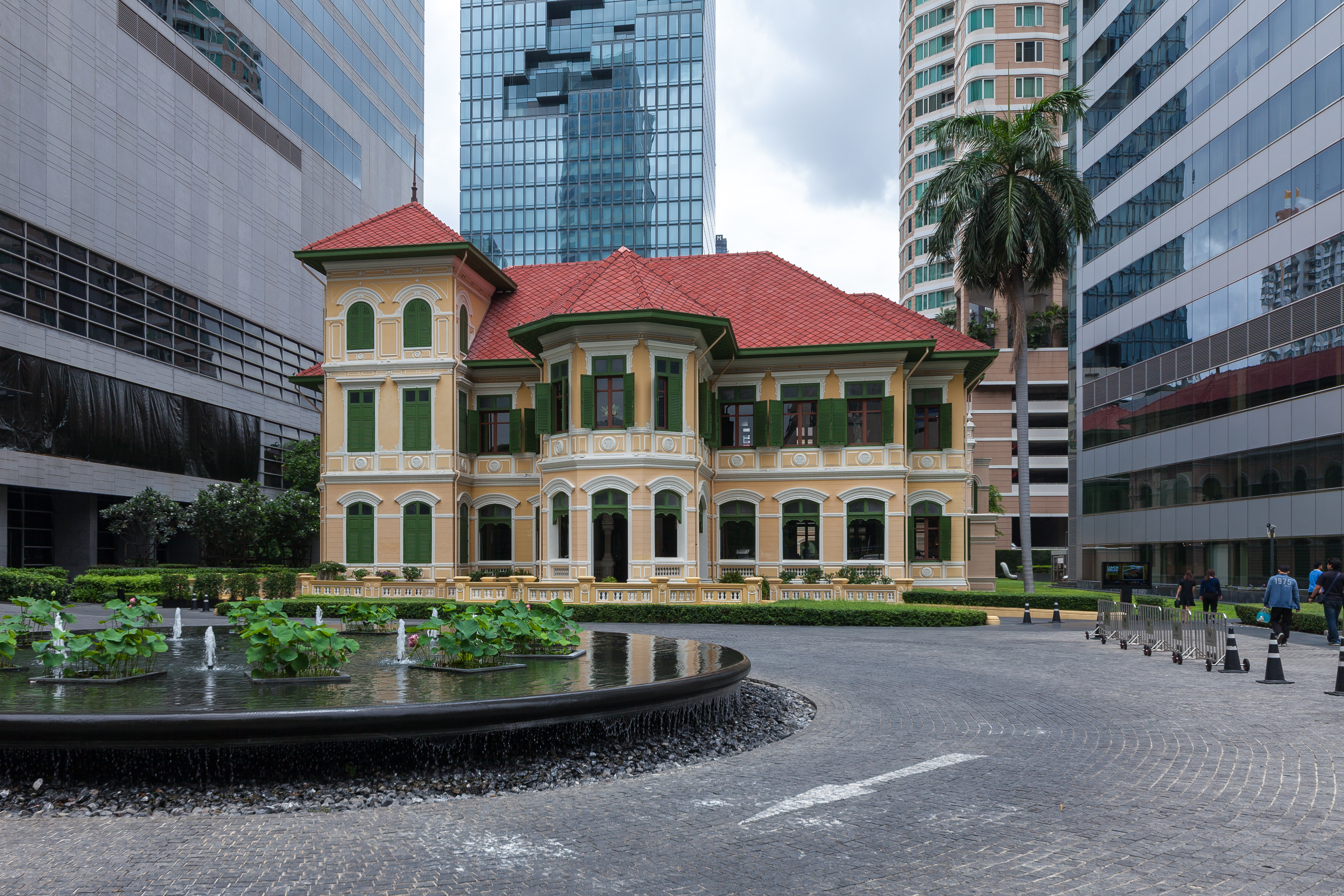
- Sathon Mansion in 2018
- Alternative names: The House on Sathorn

General information
- Status: Active
- Type: House
- Architectural style: Neoclassical
- Location: 106 North Sathon Rd., Silom Subdistrict, Bang Rak District, Bangkok, Thailand
- Coordinates: 13°43′20″N 100°31′44″E
- Current tenants: W Hotel Bangkok
- Completed: 1888
- Renovated: 2006–14

The Sathon Mansion (Thai: บ้านสาทร) or Luang Chitchamnongwanit Mansion is a complex of historic buildings in Bangkok, Thailand. It was built in 1888 for Luang Sathonrachayut (Yom Pisolyabutra), the wealthy Chinese businessman who developed Sathon Road, and later served as the Hotel Royal, the Soviet embassy (later the Russian embassy) and, since 2015, a restaurant and entertainment venue for the W Bangkok hotel, known as The House on Sathorn.

== History ==
The mansion was built in 1888, during the reign of King Chulalongkorn (Rama V), for Luang Sathonrachayut (Yom Pisolyabutra), the wealthy Chinese businessman and government official who owned and developed the land around Khlong Sathon, and later served as the residence of Luang Chitchamnongwanit, his son-in-law. In 1910, Luang Chitchamnongwanit went bankrupt, and ownership of the mansion fell to the Privy Purse (later to become the Crown Property Bureau) in 1916. King Vajiravudh (Rama VI) bestowed the mansion to Chao Phraya Ram Rakhop, and later, in the 1920s, it became the site of the Hotel Royal, under the management of Madame Staro. (Note: Adele Staro was a Neapolitan lady who previously also managed a bar and bungalow in the Charoen Krung–Surawong neighbourhood, known as the Trocadero. According to travel writer Hermann Norden, who visited Bangkok in 1921, she was the only European woman to have received the Order of the White Elephant. She managed the hotel until February 1925, when she sold the business to a syndicate and returned to Italy.) In 1948, the property was leased to the USSR, and it served as the site of the Soviet embassy (later the Russian embassy) until the year 1999.

The mansion underwent extensive renovations in the 2000s, as part of the development of the Sathorn Square office tower and the W Bangkok hotel, which now flank the mansion on each side. It reopened in July 2015 as a restaurant and entertainment venue for the W Bangkok, known as The House on Sathorn. The building complex received the ASA Architectural Conservation Award in the award of merit for the architecture and community heritage conservation category for the 2020–2021 year.

== Architecture ==
The complex comprises four buildings surrounding a central courtyard. The main mansion, the first to be built, is a two-storey structure in the Neoclassical style, with a central front porch and a three-storey tower in one corner. The hipped roof is covered with diamond-shaped cement tiles, and the interior is extensively decorated with carved teak, with tin ceilings on the lower floor. The two three-storey side wings were added during Luang Chitchamnongwanit's time, and the rear building, originally a single-storey service building, was later converted to a two-storey reinforced concrete structure.
