= The Atlanta Hotel (Bangkok) =

Hotel in Bangkok, Thailand

Coordinates: 13.737174365680707°N 100.55181292187034°E

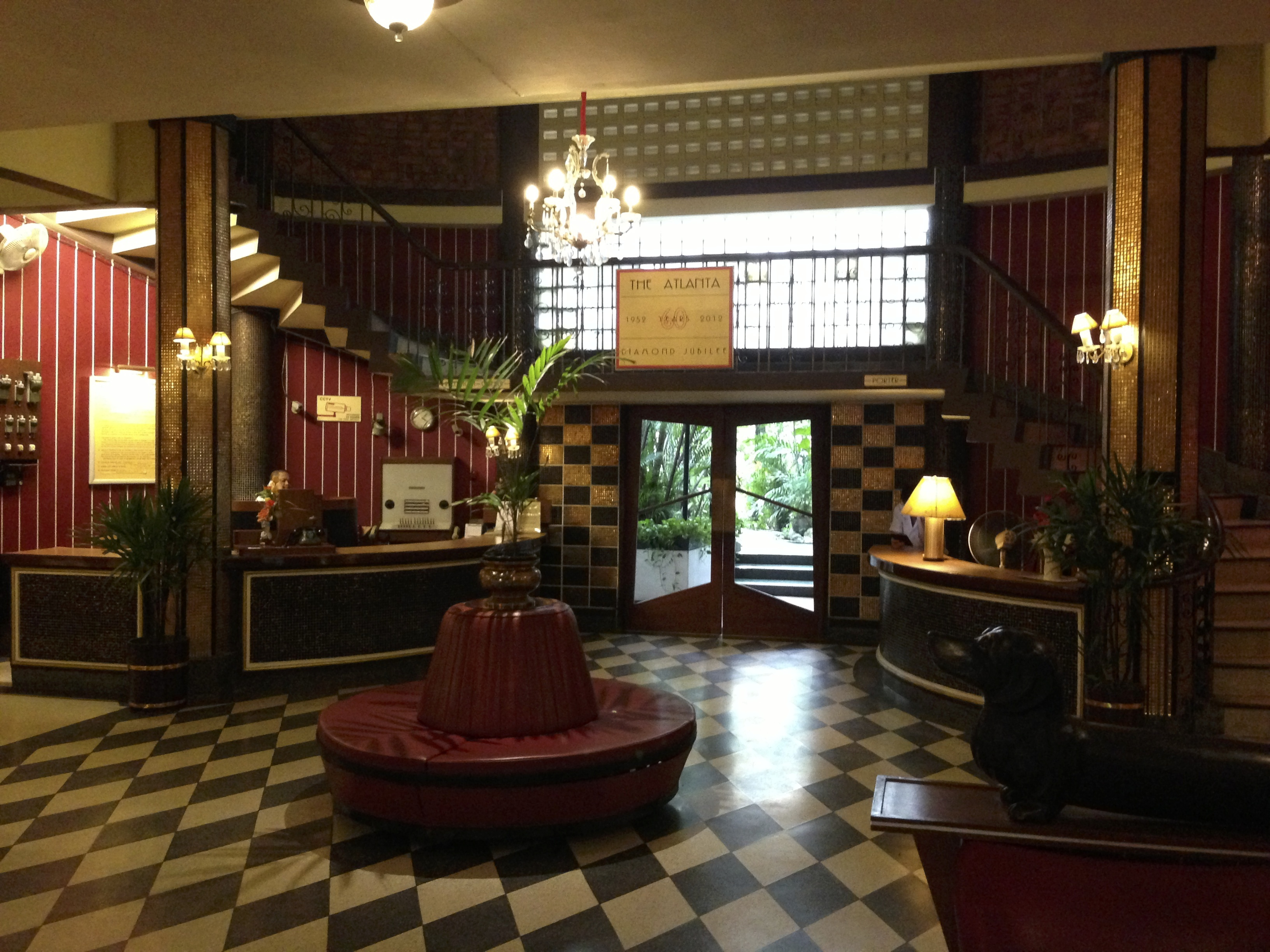
The Atlanta Hotel, Bangkok

The Atlanta hotel is a hotel located on Sukhumvit Road, Soi 2 in Bangkok, Thailand. Opened in 1952 by Dr. Max Henn, the hotel is known for its art deco interior design.

== History ==
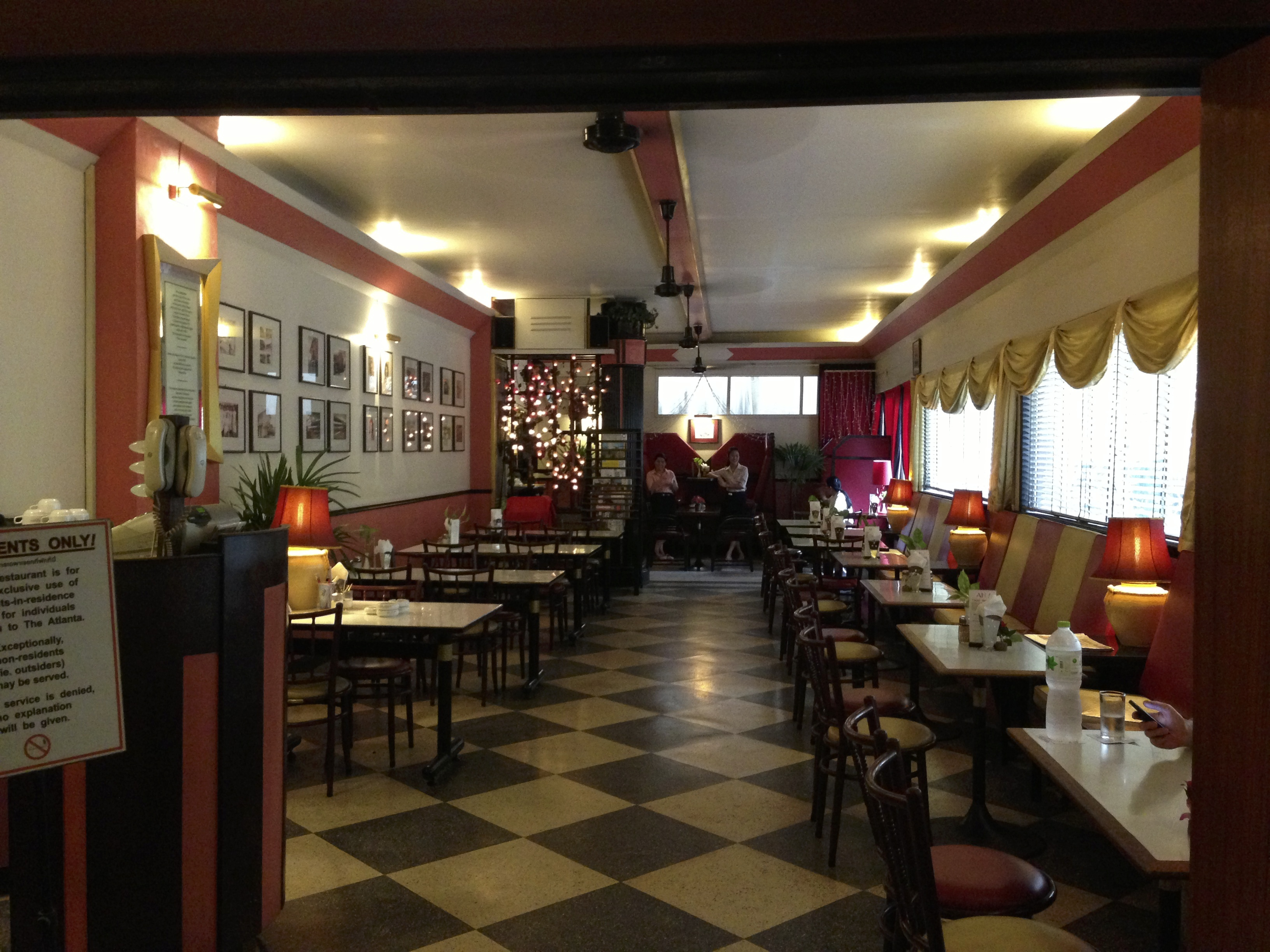
The Atlanta Hotel Bangkok

The first owner of The Atlanta, Dr. Max Henn, grew up in Germany and moved to Bangkok in 1947, where he married Mukda Buresbamrungkarn, a Thai aristocrat. Henn purchased the Atlanta's building, a former laboratory, the same year and set up the Atlanta Chemical Company to manufacture snakebite antivenom. He opened the hotel in 1952 when the original chemical venture failed. The first guests of the hotel were a group of American cartographers, who lived in the converted rooms of the then laboratory's top floor.

In the 1960s the hotel frequently housed American soldiers returning from Vietnam; one such military guest was US General Westmoreland.

The hotel's swimming pool, opened in 1954 and claimed to be the first in Bangkok, was originally a pit used to hold snakes used in the antivenom making process.

Since 2002 the hotel has had a strict policy against accepting sex tourists as guests, which is explicitly announced by a sign reading "sex tourists not welcome" beside its front door.
