= All Seasons Place =

Building complex in Bangkok, Thailand

China Resources Tower
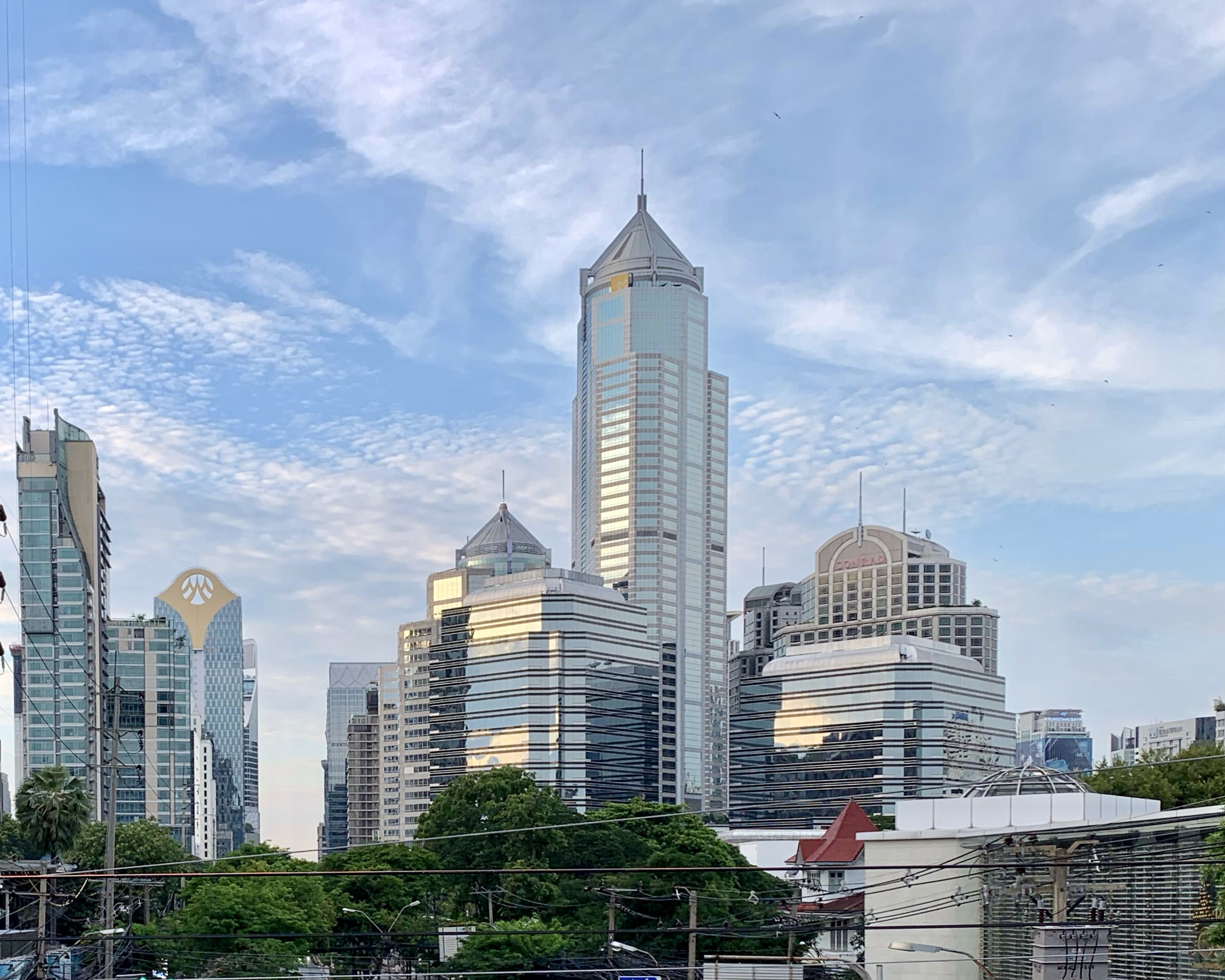
- The complex in 2021
- Interactive map of the China Resources Tower area

General information
- Status: Completed
- Location: Pathum Wan, Bangkok, Thailand
- Coordinates: 13°44′21″N 100°32′52″E
- Completed: 2002

Height
- Roof: 210 m (690 ft)

Technical details
- Floor count: 53
- Floor area: 63,000 m^{2} (680,000 sq ft)

Design and construction
- Architects: P & T Architects & Engineers Limited

All Seasons Place is a mixed-use skyscraper complex in Bangkok, Thailand. It comprises the 210-metre (690 ft)-tall China Resources Tower (also known as the China Resources Center or CRC Tower) and four smaller buildings that surround it: two office towers (M Thai Tower and Capitol Tower), a residential condominium (All Seasons Mansion) and the Conrad Bangkok hotel.

The complex, a prominent landmark on Witthayu Road in Bangkok's Pathum Wan District, is operated by All Seasons Development, a joint-venture established in 1989 between Hong Kong–based China Resources and Thai real estate developer M Thai Group. CRC Tower was the fifth-tallest building in Thailand at its completion in 2002.

== Tenants ==
Tenants at All Seasons Place include:

- Bank of America
- CBRE Group
- Embassy of Italy
- Embassy of New Zealand
- Embassy of South Africa
- Embassy of Ukraine
- Embassy of United of Arab Emirates
- Microsoft
- Tesla, Inc.

== See also ==
- List of tallest buildings in Thailand
