= Ambassador City Jomtien =

Hotel near Pattaya, Thailand

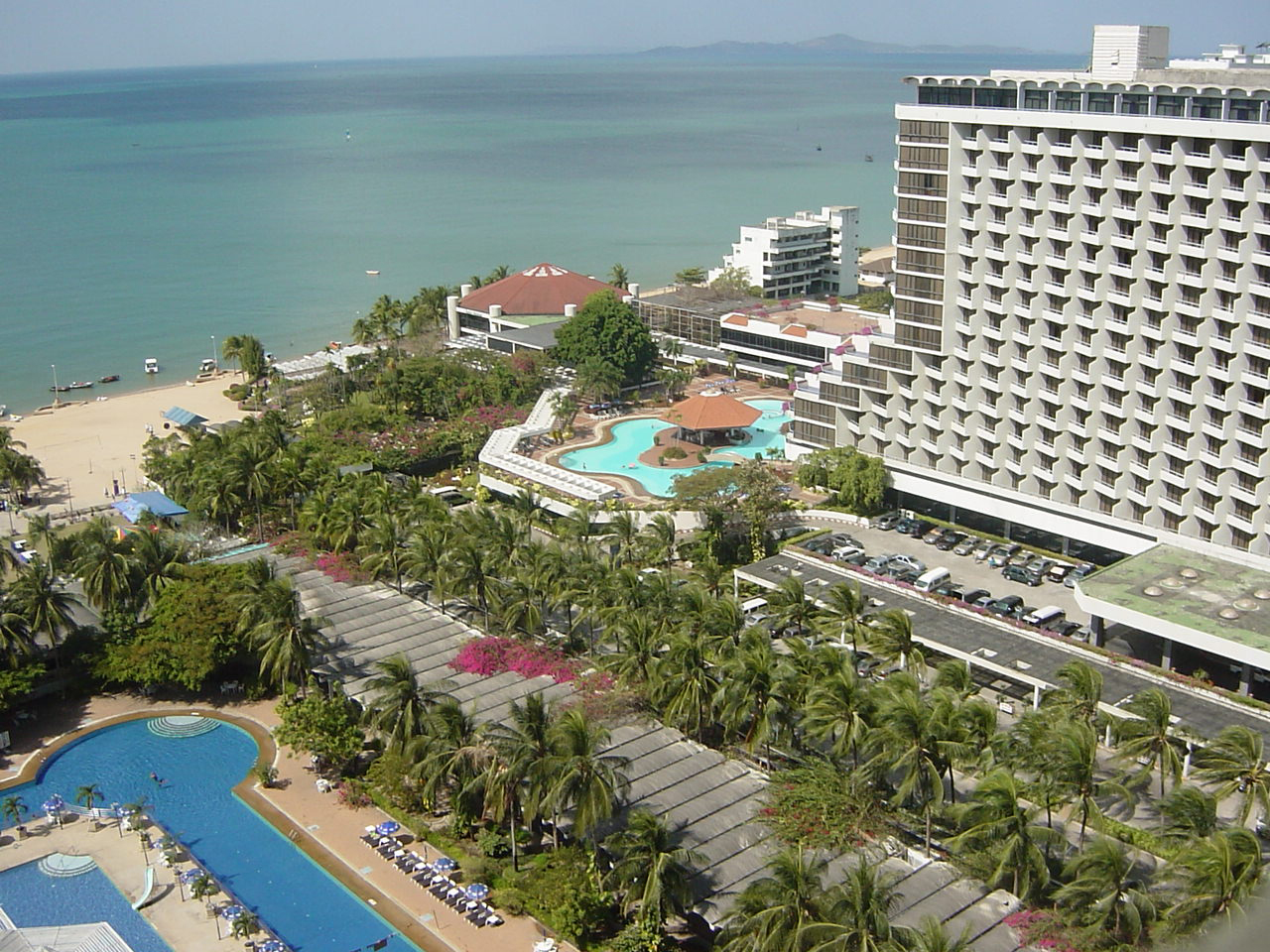
- Ambassador City Jomtien pool area

- Location within Thailand

General information
- Coordinates: 12.8389°N 100.9085°E

The Ambassador City Jomtien is a large hotel and convention centre at Jomtien Bay, near Pattaya, Thailand, with "over 4,000 rooms". Located about 8 km south of Pattaya, it occupies a 40-acre (160,000 m^{2}) campus overlooking the beach and nearby mountains. The hotel opened in 1988 as 3 buildings: 17-storey Ocean Wing (rooms with balconies), 6-storey Garden Wing and 4-storey Inn Wing (consisting of three buildings), after added 3 buildings: 42-storey Tower Wing (guest rooms overlooking Koh Larn and Sattahip, rooms situated on the 5th - 42rd floors have not balconies) and 6-storey Ambassador Wing, that each contain 150 to 2,000 rooms and suites. There are eight restaurants, several bars and nightclubs, a convention center, sport centre and what is claimed to be Asia's largest swimming pool.

The Ambassador City hosted the United Kingdom Contingent to the 20th World Scout Jamboree consisting of 2,500 young people aged between 14 and 18 and many of their support staff prior to the Jamboree at Sattahip in 2002/3.

The hotel is located at: 21/10 Sukhumvit Rd., Na Jomtien, Sattahip, Chonburi, 20250, Thailand

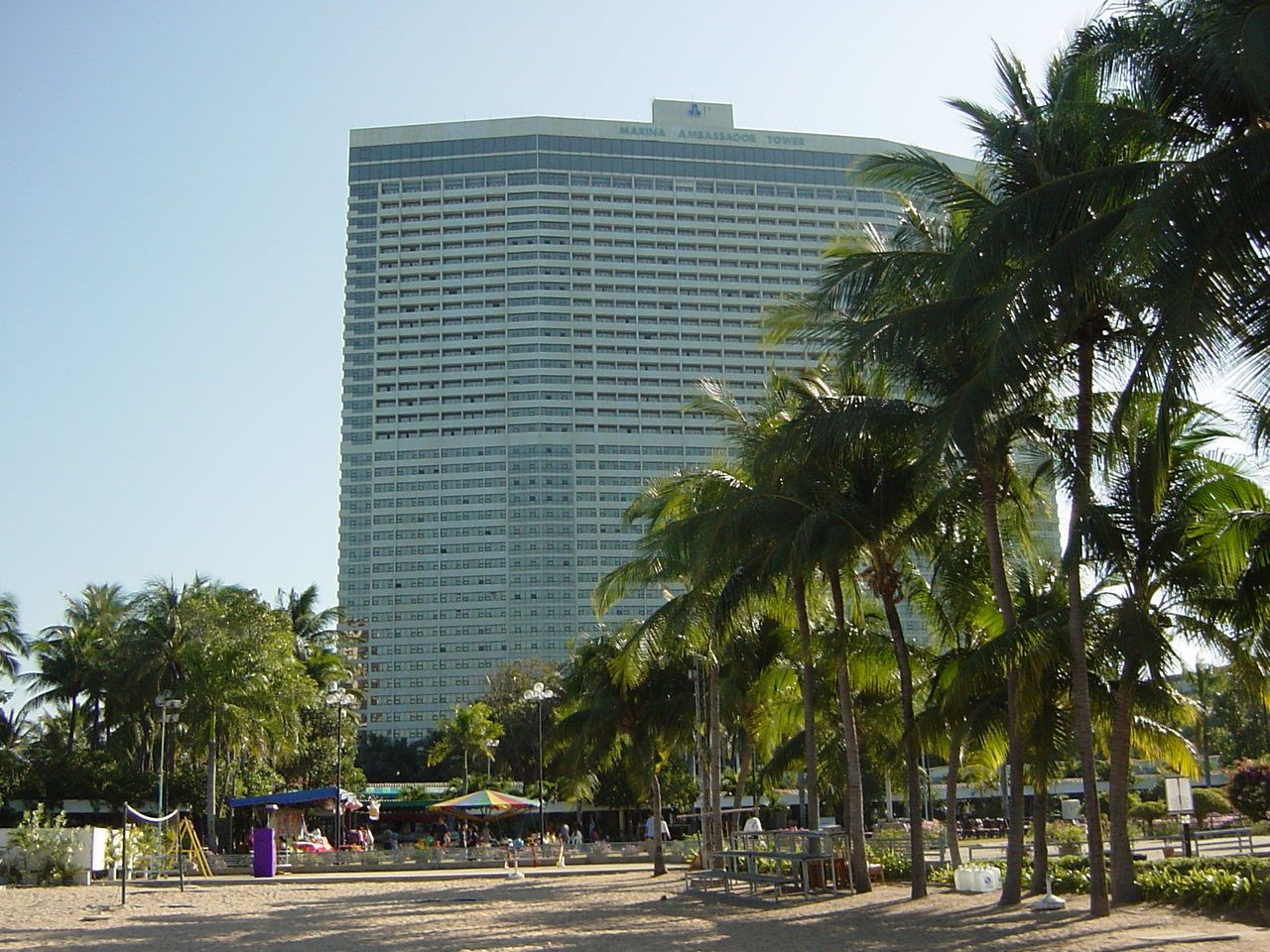

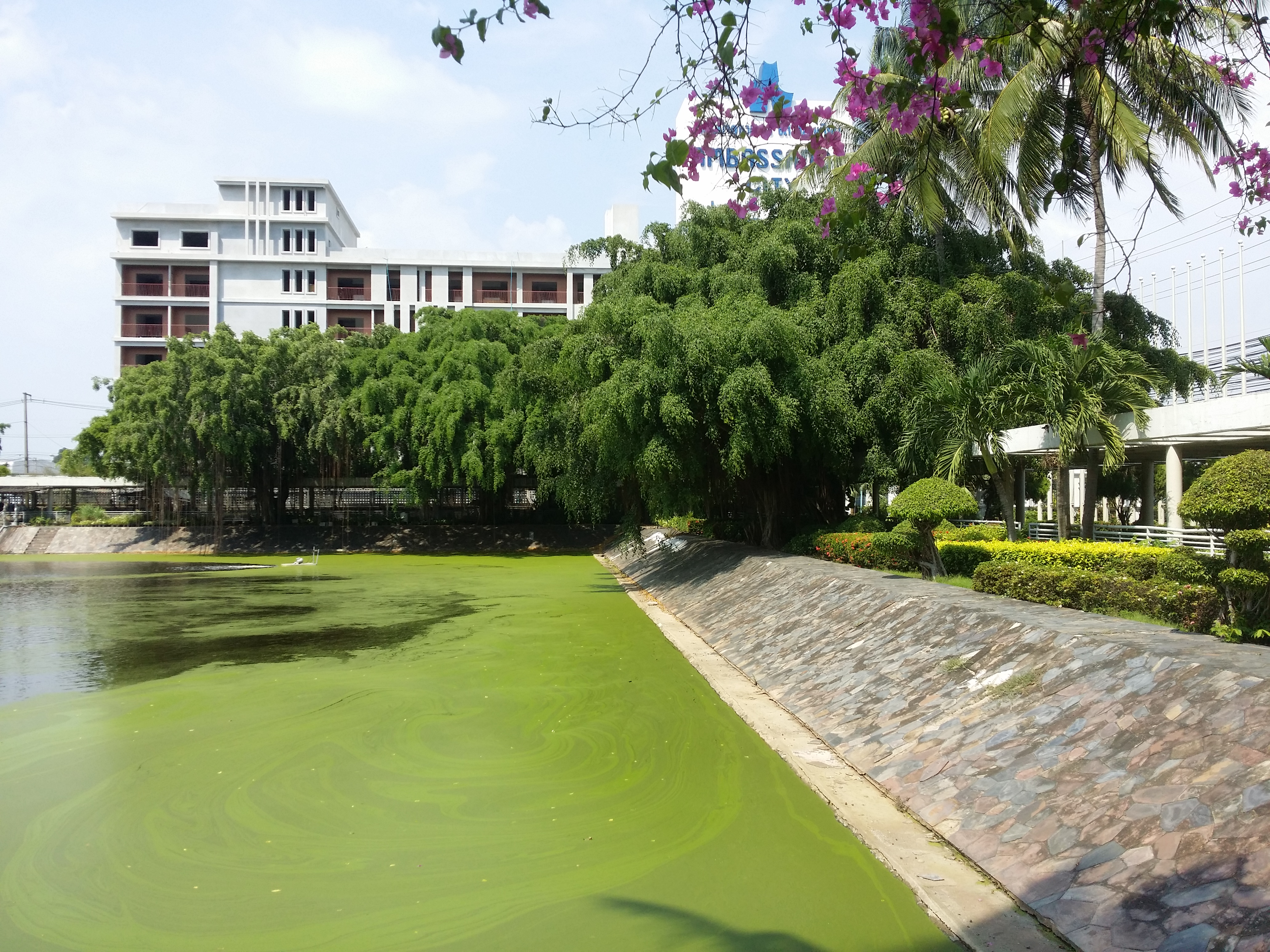

== See also ==
- List of largest hotels
