= Centara Grand at CentralWorld =

Hotel in Bangkok, Thailand

- Centara Grand in 2026 taken from Baiyoke Tower II

General information
- Status: Completed
- Location: Bangkok, Thailand
- Coordinates: 13°44′52″N 100°32′19″E
- Construction started: 2005
- Estimated completion: 2008
- Opening: 2008

Height
- Roof: 235 meters (771 ft)

Technical details
- Floor count: 56

Design and construction
- Architects: Tandem Architects, Brennan Beer Gorman

Centara Grand at CentralWorld is a hotel located in Pathum Wan District, Bangkok, Thailand. It is the flagship of Central Group's Centara Hotels and Resorts.

== Facilities ==
The hotel includes a swimming pool, choice of restaurants and bars, fitness centre, spa, Jacuzzi, sauna and steam rooms, business centre, two floodlit tennis courts and indoor parking. The Bangkok Convention Centre at CentralWorld has over 10,000 square metres of function space.

The CentralWorld lifestyle and shopping mall has over 500 stores, 50 restaurants and 15 movie theatres.

== See also ==
- List of tallest buildings in Thailand
- List of tallest buildings in Bangkok
