= Conrad Bangkok =

Hotel in Bangkok

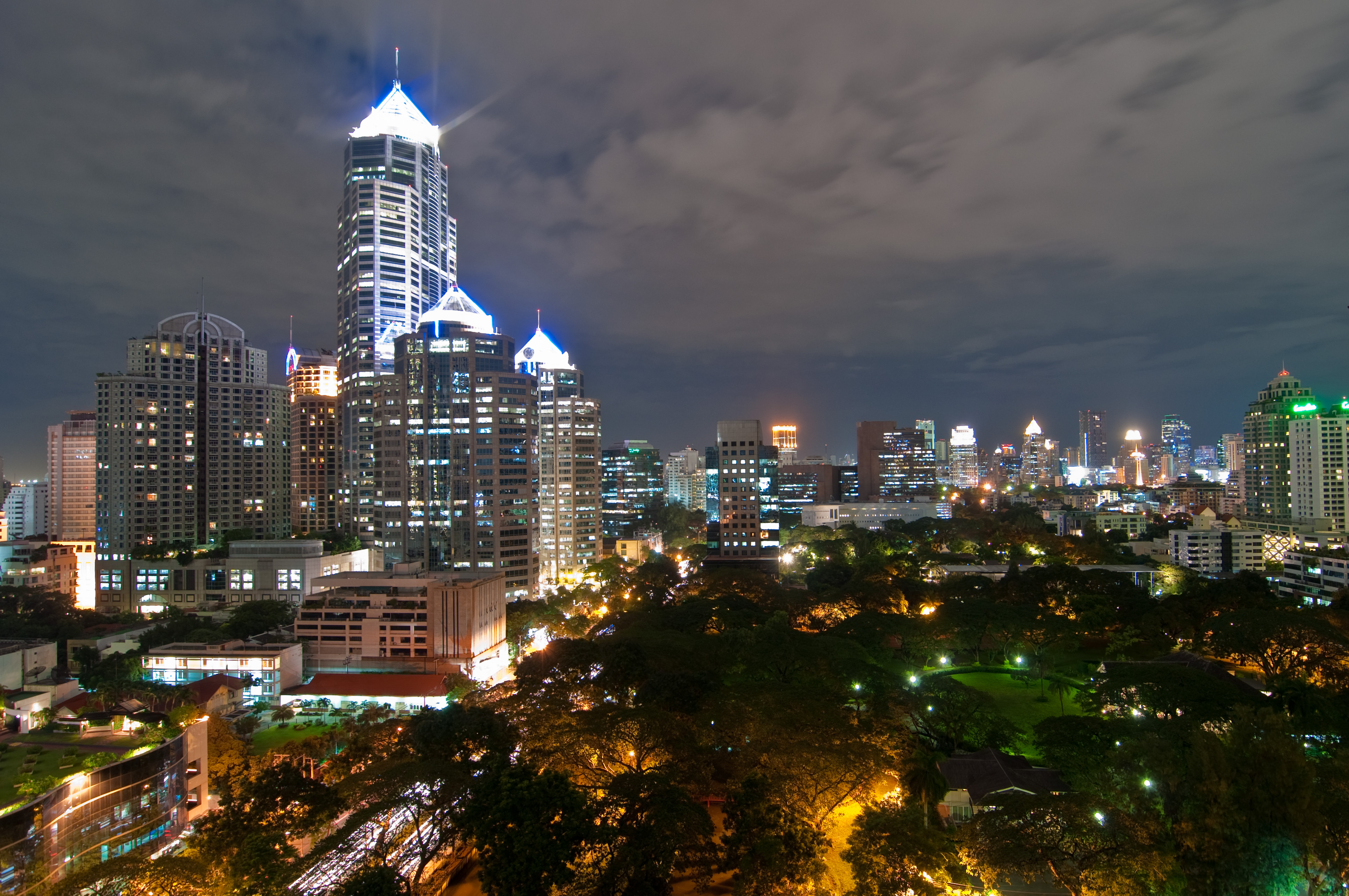
- All Seasons Place, the skyscraper complex that houses Conrad Bangkok, awash with light in 2009
- Interactive map of the Conrad Bangkok area
- Hotel chain: Conrad Hotels

General information
- Type: Hotel
- Classification: 5 stars
- Location: Bangkok, Thailand, 87 Thanon Witthayu
- Coordinates: 13°44′19″N 100°32′54″E
- Opening: 18 Mar 2003

Other information
- Number of rooms: 392
- Number of restaurants: 6

Website
- Official website

Conrad Bangkok is a hotel in Bangkok, Thailand, that is part of the Conrad Hotels brand owned by Hilton Worldwide. It opened in 2003. The hotel has 392 rooms and suites. There are six restaurants and lounges at the hotel including KiSara restaurant which serves Japanese cuisine and Liu restaurant which offers traditional Chinese food. The hotel also has a gym, a spa, a swimming pool, tennis courts, and a rooftop jogging track.

Part of the shopping complex All Seasons Place, it is located on Wireless Road, a road with numerous condominiums and embassies. The hotel's primary clientele are business travellers from Hong Kong, Singapore, Taiwan, and the United States. To address competitive pressures from new hotels in Bangkok, the hotel renovated its conference rooms and hotel rooms between 2018 and 2019. For business guests, the hotel houses 22 meeting spaces. Among these is the Conrad Ballroom, which can house either 60 banquet tables or 1,200 people who remain on their feet during a cocktail party.

== History ==
In January 1994, on behalf of Conrad Bangkok, whose parent company was Hilton Worldwide, Eric Hilton signed an agreement with All Seasons Property Co. Ltd. to build the hotel. The agreement specified that the five-star hotel would have 33 stories and 400 rooms. Two companies, M Thai Group and China Resort Co, controlled All Seasons Property in a joint venture. All Seasons Property planned to build a ฿14 billion (US$560 million) structure with five towers that would include the Conrad Bangkok hotel.

Conrad Bangkok began business in January 2003. When the hotel opened, The Nation said that it would become a "serious contender" to The Athenee Hotel, which was close by. The Nation noted that although there was a glut of hotels in Bangkok, new hotels like Conrad Bangkok kept being developed. In the hotel's inaugural year, its occupancy rate on average was 58% which the hotel attributed to negative factors including the Iraq War, the 2002–2004 SARS outbreak, and worries about safety. In 2003, Riduan Isamuddin, who was an associate of Osama bin Laden and who had been arrested in Thailand, told CIA interrogators that Al-Qaeda had planned to strike Conrad Bangkok. In response, the hotel was patrolled by soldiers carrying automatic rifles and bomb-detecting dogs. Conrad Bangkok's debut marked the 15th Conrad-branded hotel worldwide to launch and the third Asian-based hotel to launch, behind branches in Hong Kong and Singapore. On the hotel's opening day, it hosted an event where 10 people climbed up its walls dressed as Spider-Man. Princess Ubol Ratana attended the launch event in March 2003, and Cirque du Soleil performed.

The hotel expected a small decrease in the number of rented hotel rooms in 2006, which it attributed to "unfavourable conditions". As business travel to Bangkok was increasingly significantly, the hotel underwent a renovation that year of its rooms and business lounge to try to attract that clientele. The hotel's general manager said in 2006 that of its guests, 75% were in the meetings, incentives, conferencing, exhibitions category while only 10% were in the recreation category. Businesspeople from Hong Kong, Singapore, Taiwan, and the United States comprise most of the hotel's clientele. Owing to competitive pressure from other hotels opening in Bangkok, the hotel began a renovation initiative in 2018 of its conference rooms and hotel rooms. The Bangkok Post's Pongpet Mekloy praised the initiative, writing, "The facelifted interior subtly but beautifully blends Thai elegance with modern feel and practicality."

== Location ==
Connected to the shopping mall All Seasons Place, it is located on Wireless Road, a road populated by condominiums and embassies. When the hotel opened, All Seasons Place had American chains including Starbucks and Burger King and upscale shops. The hotel is within walking distance of Sukhumvit Road, which has numerous entertainment options. Phloen Chit BTS station is its nearest BTS Skytrain station and can be reached through a five-minute bus trip.

== Architecture ==
Conrad Bangkok spans two buildings: one houses the short-term hotel rooms while the other houses Conrad Residences which is for extended lodging. The hotel's interior design was largely architected by the United States firm Wilson and Associates' Singapore division. According to The Daily Telegraph's John Yeager about the hotel's architecture, "the Conrad is quite unlike the standard tower or upright slab" because it has an "unusual octagonal footprint". The hotel gives customers numerous sights and angles since the design accommodates distinctively formed rooms. Yeager said that instead of having the atmosphere of a "sterile" business hotel, it comes across like a resort. He based this on how an outdoor spa and a massive swimming pool are surrounded by the sections of the building that house the hotel rooms. Conrad Bangkok has a three-floor atrium. The lobby has the colours bamboo and beige and features massive pillars and an all-encompassing set of stairs. The waiting room is decorated with a carving showcasing classic Thai structures. The carving is large, made of wood, and cylindrically shaped. As part of the hotel's 2018–2019 renovation, it installed coated reception desks and floors in the lobby with marble tiles, which the magazine Business Traveller said imbues it with "a modern, stylish look". The redesign of the interior was led by Cheng Chung Design's Ray Chuang who used oak, teak, the gold colour, and "brushed-bronze".

== Amenities ==
=== Restaurants ===
Conrad Bangkok has four restaurants. One restaurant is KiSara (renamed from Drinking Tea Eating Rice in 2013), which serves Japanese cuisine and offers teppanyaki-style food. Located on the building's third floor and seating 100 people, the restaurant features four tatami rooms. It offers Matsusaka beef, sushi, and sake. Fodor's said the restaurant was expensive with a "sky-high" dinner cost, the sushi was "top-notch", the sake choices were extensive, the tea was "delicious", the sushi rice was "expertly vinegared", and the service was "almost uncomfortably deferential but never pompous". Business Traveller said, "The dishes served here are authentic and, in some cases, elaborate but are well worth trying if you’re not too pressed for time." The United States firm Wilson and Associates' Singapore division was in charge of the restaurant's interior design. Michael Fiebrich, who was the project's principal designer, said, "The concept of the restaurant is really about the contrast of the crisp contemporary architecture of the room and the more fluid natural forms within. We were striving to create something new and modern but completely Japanese." To give customers added dimensions, the restaurant, which lacks windows, employs lights and mirrors.

Another restaurant is Liu, which serves Chinese cuisine that fuses dishes from several regions. Seating 90 people, it offers dim sum and set menus as well as dishes that have frog legs. Liu serves Cantonese, Shanghainese, and Sichuan cuisine. The restaurant's concentration on a present-day style was created by the Beijing restaurant Green T. House's founder. On the 29th floor, the hotel has the Executive Lounge, which serves a variety of cuisines such as dim sum, a section where the restaurant makes egg dishes for customers, and Western breakfast food. The lounge arranges its tables in the configuration of a "U". Beside the swimming pool is the City Terrace-Pool Restaurant, which is casual dining eatery that serves light snacks and fresh juices.

Its second-floor restaurant Café@2 is open for most of the day. Other than having a section that serves pancakes and waffles, its breakfast has nearly the same offerings as what Executive Lounge has for breakfast. Café@2's executive chef Ashley T. Coleman, who is from Australia, bucked the trend of "more is more" in cooking by going with a "simplicity is tasty" mentality. To emphasise the high-quality ingredients, his dishes are made with minimal seasoning. Writing in the Hubert Burda Media publication Prestige, Mary Lsmithgul praised the restaurant, stating, "With a cosy-meets-sophisticated vibe, tasteful delicacies and an impressive selection of aperitifs, the upscale dining destination makes an ideal spot for nights out with the family, or a refined meet up over bubbly at the heart of Bangkok." Conrad Bangkok has Deli by Conrad, a laid-back coffeehouse. The hotel has a bar called Diplomat Bar on the first floor. It features live jazz performances. Fodor's said, "The Diplomat Bar is famous amongst embassy staffers for their great martinis, 4-hour Happy Hour, and live music throughout the week."

=== Guest rooms and business amenities ===
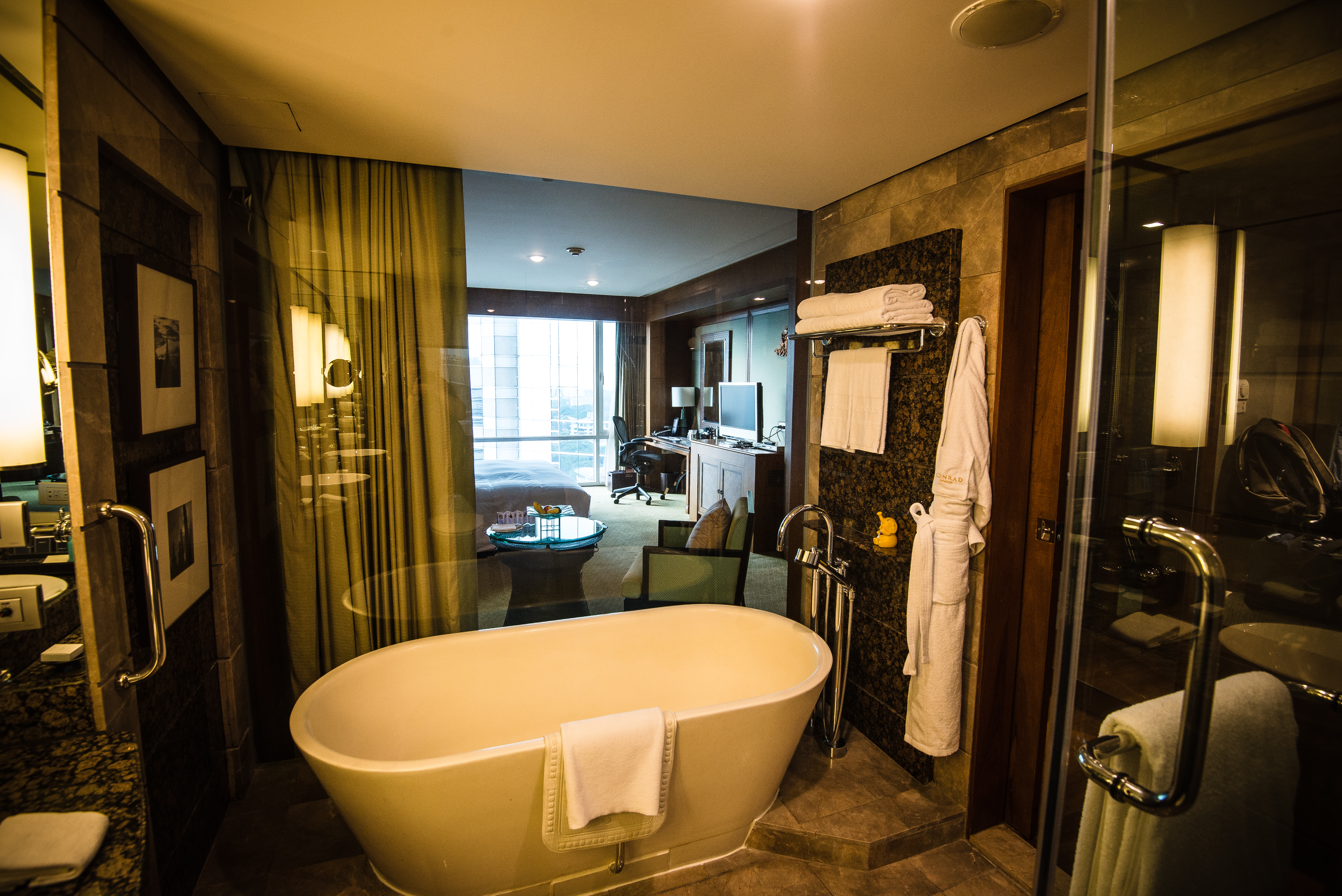
Conrad Bangkok hotel room in 2014

The hotel has 392 guest rooms. The rooms have Thai artwork, silk decorations and finished timber. The tiniest rooms belong to the "Deluxe" type and are 41 m^{2} (440 sq ft). While the size of the hotel's "Executive" rooms measured at 50 m^{2} (540 sq ft) and "Deluxe" rooms at 114 m^{2} (1,230 sq ft), its regularly sized "Classic" rooms are 40.5 m^{2} (436 sq ft). The biggest room is the Presidential Suite, which is 238 m^{2} (2,560 sq ft). The restroom is separated from the rest of the hotel room through a see-through divider, though curtains can be pulled down to achieve solitude. Each restroom has a granite countertop, both a shower and a standalone bathtub, and a luminous vanity mirror. Business Traveller magazine concluded, "The rooms are sleek and sizeable – a valuable find in any Asian capital – and the interesting mix of urban and resort styles gives the property a professional yet relaxing atmosphere overall."

For business guests, the hotel houses 22 meeting spaces. Among these is the Conrad Ballroom, which stands at 8 m (26 ft) tall and is 780 m^{2} (8,400 sq ft). The ballroom can house either 60 banquet tables or 1,200 people who remain on their feet during a cocktail party. John Yeager of The Daily Telegraph praised the hotel's customer service, writing that all employees "down to the most junior maid" could fluently converse in the English language.

=== Spa, fitness, and transportation ===
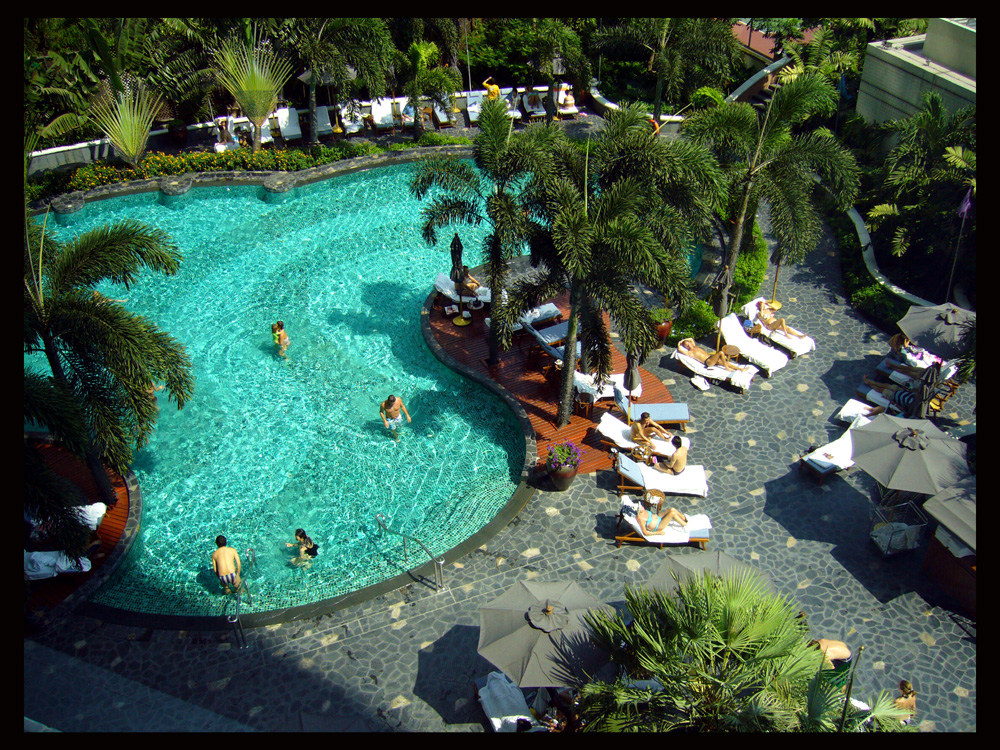
Conrad Bangkok swimming pool surrounded by palm trees, deckchairs, and umbrellas in 2006

Conrad Bangkok has a spa called Seasons Spa. In her book Thailand's Luxury Spas: Pampering Yourself in Paradise, the author Chami Jotisalikorn said it "has the feel of a five-star city spa, with a veneer of sop hesitated luxe combined with professional efficiency". The spa's services include body cleansing, facials, and massages. Roughly 50% of its clientele are businesspeople, and both men and women frequent the facilities. In addition to 11 "treatment rooms", the spa offers whirlpools and saunas for guests to use.

Conrad Bangkok has a gym that is open all day, two tennis courts that are illuminated, and a running path on the roof. Equipped with Technogym products and free weights, the gym is called Bodyworx Fitness Center. It offers fitness classes for yoga and step aerobics. It has a swimming pool that is surrounded by palm trees, deckchairs, and umbrellas, giving it the ambience of a resort. To attempt to give guests the feeling of being protected, the hotel in 2006 offered limousines given the names of magical beings from Thai folklore. In 2008, as the owner of a group of Mercedes-Benz limousines, the hotel used them most of the time to transport guests who have arrived at or are heading to a Bangkok airport. The limousines were rented to go on shipping trips. Guests can use hotel-provided motorbikes for transportation.
