= The Railway Hotel, Hua Hin =

Hotel in Hua Hin, Thailand

Coordinates: 12.568211°N 99.961787°E

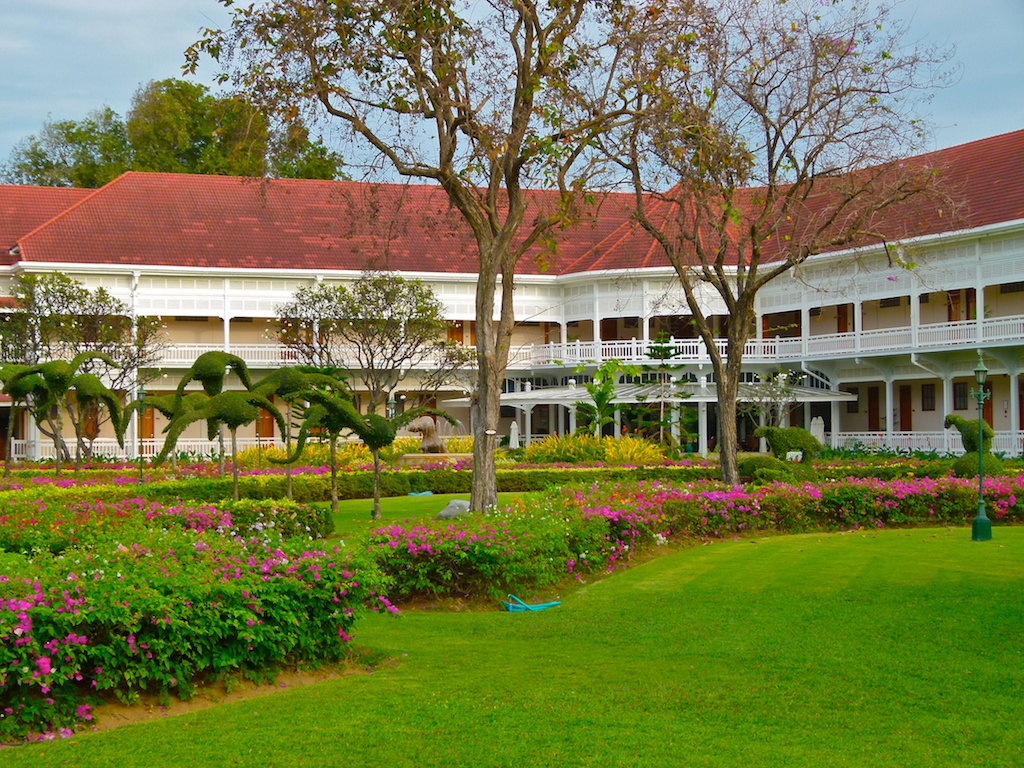
Centara Grand Beach Resort Hua Hin, 2012

The Centara Grand Beach Resort Hua Hin is a historic hotel in Hua Hin, Thailand, established in 1922 as the Railway Hotel. The hotel site is leased from the State Railway of Thailand (SRT).

== History ==
The hotel was established when Hua Hin was evolving into Thailand's first beach resort. The beauty of Hua Hin was noted by the engineers surveying the southern railway route in 1909. Land was set aside for a station, and when the first section of the line opened in 1911 Hua Hin became a destination where wealthy Bangkok residents built their holiday homes. The southern line to Malaysia was completed in 1921, making it possible to travel between Bangkok, Malaysia, and Singapore by train.

Mr. Alfredo Rigazzi, the State Railways' Italian architect, designed the original building as a luxurious two-storey European-style resort hotel made of brick and wood, in accordance with royal command. The hotel was constructed on State Railways land while existing bungalows were moved a short distance away. The hotel featured 14 bedrooms, a lobby lounge, bar, restaurant, billiards room, wine storeroom, and large verandas, costing a total of 128,366.75 baht, a staggering sum at the time. A veranda surrounded the building, cleverly designed to protect guests from the sun's heat and prevent rainwater from running back along the tiles. The building was remarkably similar in appearance to the Marukhatayawan Royal Residence in nearby Cha-am.

The Railway Hotel began receiving guests in October 1922 and held its grand opening on 1 January 1923.

King Rama VI commissioned road maintenance engineer A. O. Robins to build a golf course on land opposite the railway station, completing the original nine-hole, 3,000-yard Royal Hua-Hin Golf Course and tennis courts in time to welcome the first hotel guests on 26 October 1922.

"The railway era brought great changes to Siam, as Thailand was then known," says Thirayuth Chirathivat, chief executive officer of Centara Hotels & Resorts. "There were very few roads into the provincial areas, and places such as Hua Hin were known only to the local population. When the railway was built from Bangkok down to Malaysia, it suddenly became possible for the aristocracy of the day to travel to Hua Hin, and to enjoy the beach and the ocean."

By 1928 the hotel's reputation was international and, in order to accommodate the growing number of visitors to Hua Hin, RSR added a new wing of 13 rooms, built to exactly the same design as the existing building. It was later renamed the Hua Hin Hotel. After WWII two more guestrooms were added, along with three restaurants, a downstairs bar, and a lobby with a panoramic view of Hua Hin's bay.

The hotel stood in for the Hotel Le Phnom as a filming location in the 1984 film The Killing Fields.

In 1988, Sofitel assumed management and the hotel became the Hotel Sofitel Central Hua Hin. In 2012, the management contract ended, and the hotel was renamed Centara Grand Beach Resort Hua Hin, run by the Central Plaza Hotel Public Company (CENTEL), Ltd.
