= Cape Panwa Hotel =

Hotel on the island of Phuket, Thailand

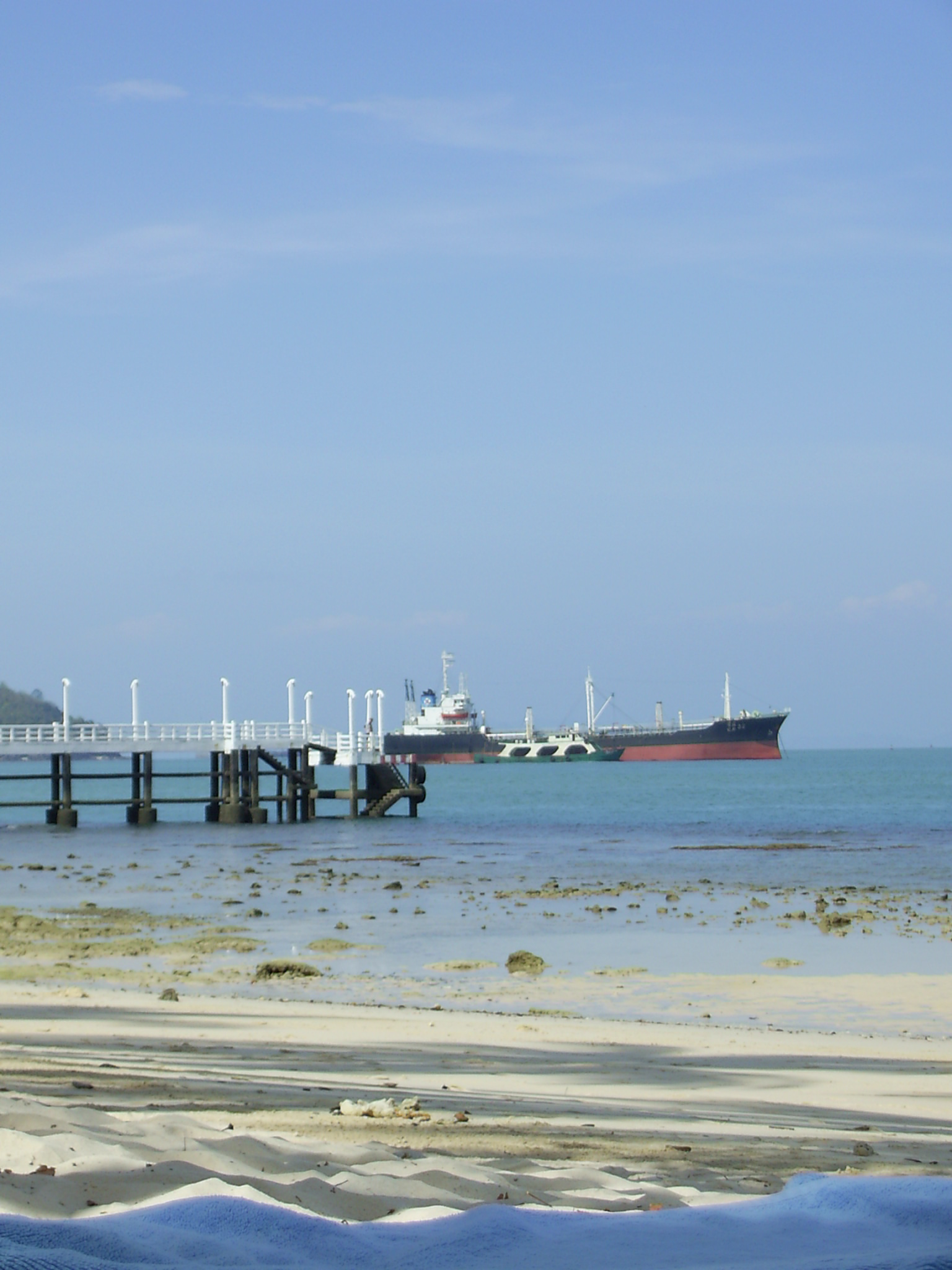
- Interactive map of the Cape Panwa Hotel area

General information
- Classification: Luxury resort
- Location: Cape Panwa, Phuket Province, Thailand
- Coordinates: 7.807265°N 98.409218°E
- Opened: 1980
- Owner: Tirapongse Pangsrivongse
- Management: Cape and Kantary Hotel Group

Website
- capepanwa.com

The Cape Panwa Hotel is a luxury hotel on the island of Phuket, Thailand. It was considered one of the first luxury resorts in Phuket upon its opening in December 1987.

Notable guests included Elizabeth Taylor in 1989 as well as Pierce Brosnan, Leonardo DiCaprio, Gordon Ramsay, Jean-Claude Van Damme, Michelle Yeoh, and Catherine Zeta-Jones. The hotel is known for its idiosyncratic charm: odd features include the hotel's pet otter, the vintage hotel tram, a sunken labyrinthine bridge that projects out into the corral reef, and frequent visitations by bathing monkeys. The hotel has provided the site for numerous documentaries as well as major film shoots. The owner and current founder is environmentalist and TSPCA president Tirapongse Pangsrivongse.

The Cape Panwa Hotel is a member of the Cape and Kantary Hotel group, one of Thailand's hotel and serviced apartment chains.

== Events ==
Cape Panwa Hotel is the Title sponsor of an international sailing regatta that is held each July and based at Cape Panwa Hotel and its sister resort Kantary Bay Hotel.
