= Baiyoke Tower I =

Skyscraper in Bangkok, Thailand

Baiyoke Tower I in 2026 taken from Baiyoke Tower II

Baiyoke Tower I is a skyscraper in Bangkok, Thailand. It was completed in 1987 and was the tallest building in Thailand until 1993, when it was surpassed by Sinn Sathorn Tower. Baiyoke Tower is located in on Ratchaprarop Road in the Pratu Nam area of Ratchathewi District, and houses the Baiyoke Suite Hotel. The building is 151 metres (495 ft) high, with 43 floors. Its balconies are distinctively painted in rainbow colors and locked for Hotel guests. The rooftop buffet also features some of the best view over bangkok.

Coordinates 13.753074°N 100.539489°E

G M 2-9 retail zone G L 7 9-43 guestrooms zone

== Gallery ==
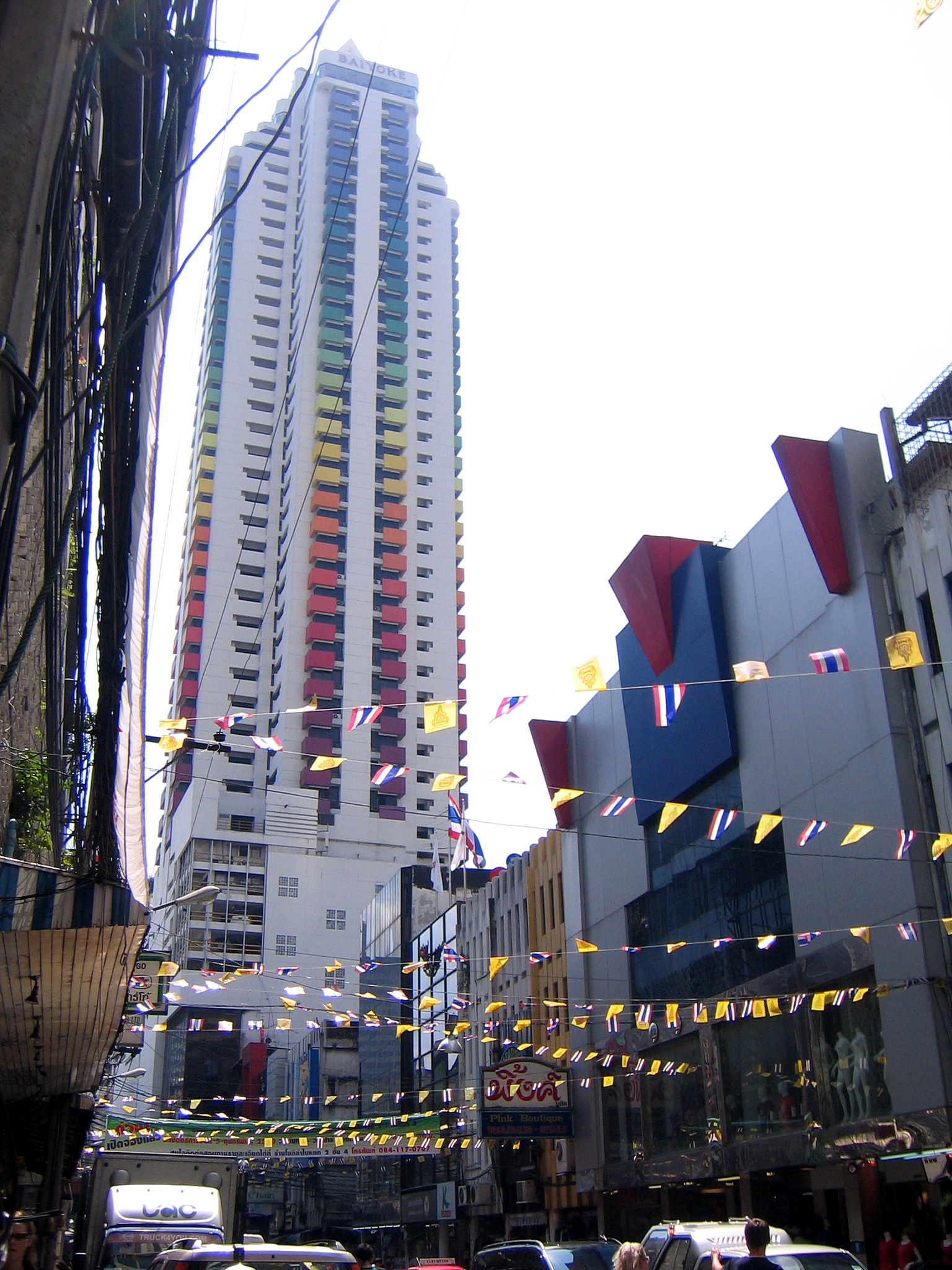
Baiyoke Tower I in 2007

Baiyoke Tower I in 2022

Records
Preceded by Bangkok Bank Headquarters	Tallest building in Thailand; 150.9 m (495 ft); 1987–1993	Succeeded by Sinn Sathorn Tower
