= Attap dwelling =

Traditional house of Southeast Asia

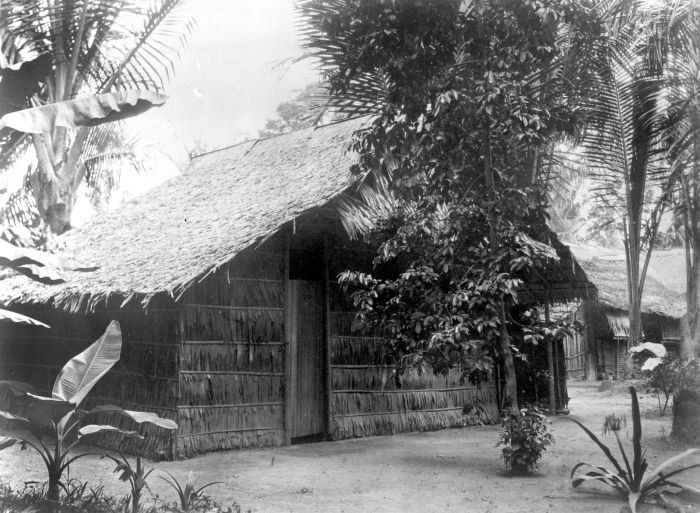
A house with attap roof and walls. Image: Tropenmuseum.

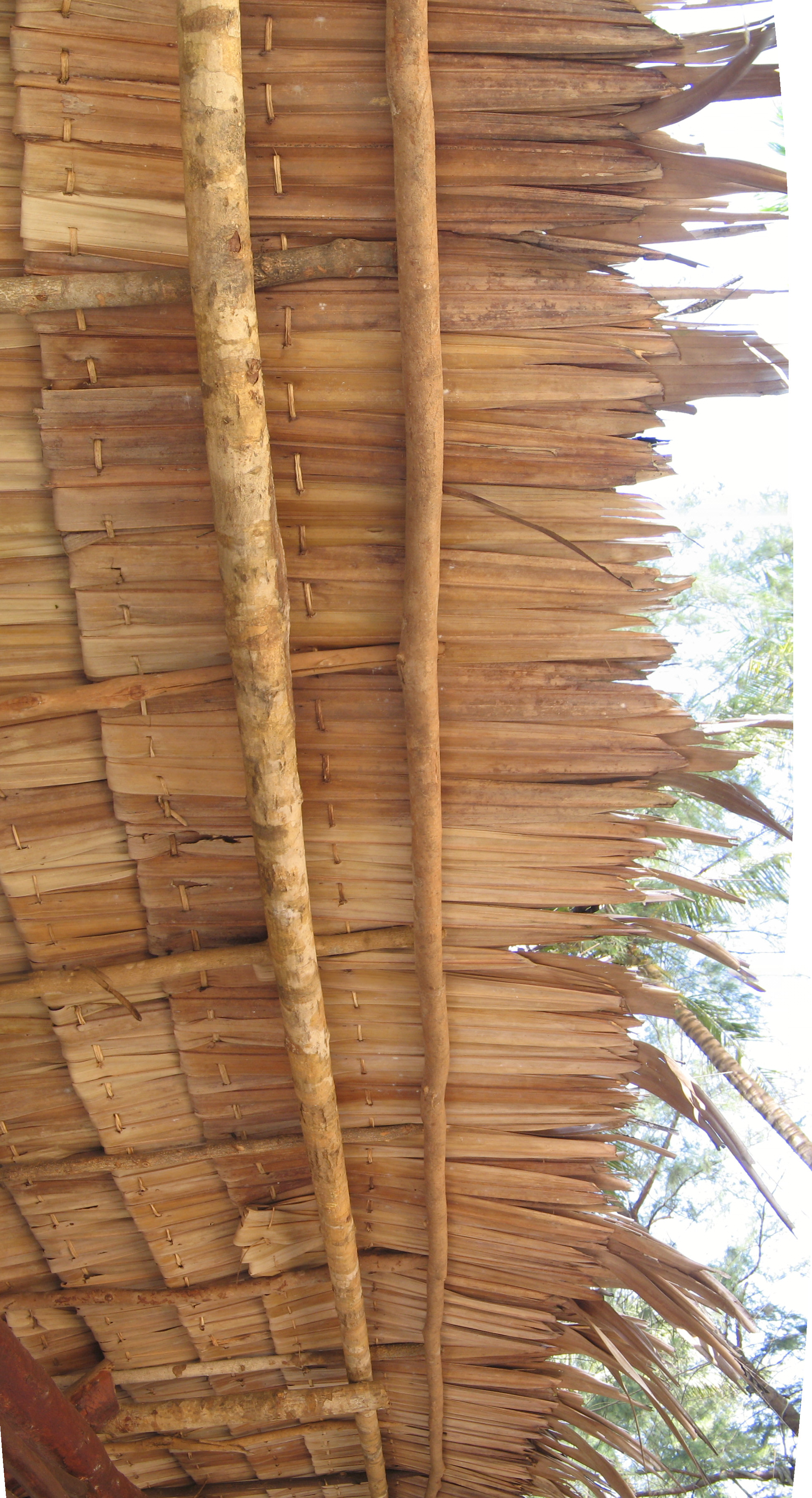
Detail of attap roof thatching

An attap dwelling is traditional housing found in the kampongs of Brunei, Indonesia, Malaysia and Singapore. Named after the attap palm, which provides the wattle for the walls, and the leaves with which their roofs are thatched (attap itself from Malay atap "roof"), these dwellings can range from huts to substantial houses. Until the nineteenth century even significant public buildings such as temples were built in this manner. The attap dwelling was used as the inspiration for the natural cross ventilation system for Newton Suites, by WOHA Architects, Singapore.

== Singapore ==
Attap-roofed houses were formerly common in rural areas of Singapore. From the 1950s onwards, many attap roofs were replaced by zinc sheeting. Public housing and urban renewal programmes resulted in a sharp decline in the number of attap- and zinc-roofed houses starting from the 1960s. As of the 1980 Census, 10.8% of houses were attap- or zinc-roofed, vs. 34% in 1970; most were located in outlying areas.

== Sources ==
- Normand-Prunieres, Helene. 'Malaysian Dwellings', Proceedings of ENHR International Housing Conference 2004, (Cambridge: University, 2004)
