= The Pano =

- The Pano in 2022

General information
- Type: Residential
- Location: Bangkok, Thailand
- Coordinates: 13°40′17.82″N 100°32′31.19″E
- Construction started: 2007
- Completed: 2010

Height
- Antenna spire: 219.0 metres (718.5 ft)
- Roof: 219.0 metres (718.5 ft)

Technical details
- Floor count: 57

Design and construction
- Architects: WOHA, Tandem Architects

The Pano is a 57-storey riverside condominium located in Bangkok. It is the thirteenth tallest building and fourth tallest residential building in Thailand.

The Pano has a height of 219 metres and 57 floors. It contains 397 condominium units and is composed of two wings, the Sky Wing (high-rise) and the River Wing (low-rise).

The Pano placed fourth on the 2010 Emporis Skyscraper Award, an award for architectural excellence regarding the design of buildings and their functionality. WOHA, the architectural firm, won the Singapore President's Design Award.

== See also ==
- List of tallest buildings in Thailand
