= Leonard Ng =

Singaporean landscape architect

Leonard Ng Keok Poh
- Education: Lincoln University (BArch); Architectural Association School of Architecture (MArch)

Leonard Ng Keok Poh is a Singaporean landscape architect. He currently serves at the Singapore market director for Danish architecture firm Henning Larsen Architects. Ng has focused on increasing green space in Singapore, including projects like Bishan-Ang Mo Kio Park, Jurong Lake Garden, and Kampung Admiralty.

== Career ==
Formerly a proprietary trader at United Overseas Bank, Ng took night classes at Lincoln University to become certified as a landscape architect. In 2023 Ng was conferred the Designer of the Year Award as part of Singapore’s President’s Design Award. He joined Atelier Dreiseiti in 2006, establishing the Singapore office.
