= Studio Lotus =

Design company

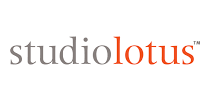
- Founded: 2002
- Founder: Ambrish Arora, Ankur Choksi and Sidhartha Talwar
- Headquarters: New Delhi, India
- Number of employees: 60 (2020)
- Website: studiolotus.in

Studio Lotus is a multi-disciplinary design company, established in 2002, headquartered in New Delhi.

Studio Lotus is an architecture and design company which received World Architecture News Awards, the Grand Jury Prize at the Design for Asia Award, the Prix Versailles Special Prize for Restaurant Interiors and others.

The company has also been part of the Architectural Digest India list of the 50 most influential names in Architecture & Design for 5 consecutive years and received the Grand Jury Prize at Design For Asia Awards, a Special Mention at the DOMUS International Restoration Awards Italy and Silver at the Asia Pacific Interior Design Awards.

== History ==
Studio Lotus was founded in 2002 by Ambrish Arora, Ankur Choksi and Sidhartha Talwar in New Delhi. Seventeen years later, it is one of the top architectural firms of India, with Ambrish Arora, Ankur Choksi, Asha Sairam and Harsh Vardhan at the helm as Principals.

== Notable works ==
- Krushi Bhawan, an official building for Government of Odisha's Department of Agriculture & Farmers' Empowerment. It was highly commended at the World Architecture Festival Awards in 2019.
- Visitor centre for Mehrangarh fort
- Clubhouse at The Trees Godrej's flagship development in Vikhroli, Mumbai

== Awards and recognition ==
- Surface Design Award 2020
- World Architecture Festival Award 2019
- Kyoorius Design Awards for 2014, 2016, and 2019
- Perspective 40 under 40 Awards 2019
- Forbes India Design Awards 2019
- Prix Versailles 2018 Special Prize Interior Awards
- National Award for Excellence in Architecture 2018 (IIA Awards)
- CWAB Awards 2018
- AD 100 Awards 2018
- World Architecture News (WAN) Awards 2016
- International Interior Design Association (IIDA) Best of Asia Pacific Design Award 2014
- 7 Architects and Interior Designers by Forbes 2010
