= Emporis Skyscraper Award =

Architecture prize

The Emporis Skyscraper Award was an award for architectural excellence regarding the design of buildings and their functionality.

The award was presented annually by Emporis, a real estate data mining company with headquarters in Hamburg, Germany. The award is given to the building representing the "Best new skyscraper for design and functionality". To qualify, nominated buildings must have been completed during the year of the award, and must be at least 100 meters in height. Nominees and winners were chosen by Emporis editors, and the award would have been announced the following January and is usually presented the following spring or summer. Prior to 2000, the award was known as the Skyscrapers.com Award.

== Winners of the Emporis Skyscraper Award ==
Year	First place		Second place			Third place		
Year	Building	City	Building		City	Building		City
2000	Sofitel New York Hotel	(United States) New York City	–	–	–	–	–	–
2001	One Wall Centre	(Canada) Vancouver	Millennium Point		(United States) New York City	Plaza 66		(China) Shanghai
2002	Kingdom Centre	(Saudi Arabia) Riyadh	Post Tower		(Germany) Bonn	111 Huntington Avenue		(United States) Boston
2003	30 St Mary Axe	(United Kingdom) London	Highcliff		Hong Kong	Skybridge		(United States) Chicago
2004	Taipei 101	(Taiwan) Taipei	Torre Agbar		(Spain) Barcelona	World Tower		(Australia) Sydney
2005	Turning Torso	(Sweden) Malmö	Q1		(Australia) Gold Coast	Montevideo Tower		(Netherlands) Rotterdam
2006	Hearst Tower	(United States) New York City	The Wave		(Australia) Gold Coast	Eureka Tower		(Australia) Melbourne
2007	Het Strijkijzer	(Netherlands) The Hague	Newton Suites		Singapore	Ontario Tower		(United Kingdom) London
2008	Mode Gakuen Cocoon Tower	(Japan) Tokyo	Boutique Monaco	–	(South Korea) Seoul	Shanghai World Financial Center		(China) Shanghai
2009	Aqua	(United States) Chicago	O-14	–	(United Arab Emirates) Dubai	The Met		(Thailand) Bangkok
2010	Hotel Porta Fira	(Spain) Barcelona	Burj Khalifa		(United Arab Emirates) Dubai	Tour CMA CGM		(France) Marseille
2011	8 Spruce Street	(United States) New York City	Al Hamra Tower		Kuwait City	Etihad Towers		(United Arab Emirates) Abu Dhabi
2012	Absolute World Towers	(Canada) Mississauga	Al Bahr Towers		(United Arab Emirates) Abu Dhabi	Burj Qatar		(Qatar) Doha
2013	The Shard	(United Kingdom) London	DC Tower 1		(Austria) Vienna	Sheraton Huzhou Hot Spring Resort		(China) Huzhou
2014	Wangjing SOHO	(China) Beijing	Bosco Verticale		(Italy) Milan	Tour D2		(France) Courbevoie
2015	Shanghai Tower	(China) Shanghai	Evolution Tower		(Russia) Moscow	Torre Isozaki		(Italy) Milan
2016	VIA 57 West	(United States) New York City	Torre Reforma		Mexico City	Oasia Hotel Downtown		Singapore
2017	Lotte World Tower	(South Korea) Seoul	Generali Tower		(Italy) Milan	150 North Riverside		(United States) Chicago
2018	MGM Cotai	Macau	La Marseillaise		(France) Marseille	52 Lime Street (The Scalpel)		(United Kingdom) London
2019	Lakhta Center	(Russia) Saint Petersburg	Leeza SOHO		(China) Beijing	35 Hudson Yards		(United States) New York City
2020	Crown Sydney	(Australia) Sydney	Telus Sky		(Canada) Calgary	One Vanderbilt		(United States) New York City
2021	Valley Amsterdam	(Netherlands) Amsterdam	111 West 57th Street		(United States) New York City	NV Tower		(Bulgaria) Sofia

== See also ==
- Emporis
- List of architecture prizes
