= The Wave (Gold Coast) =

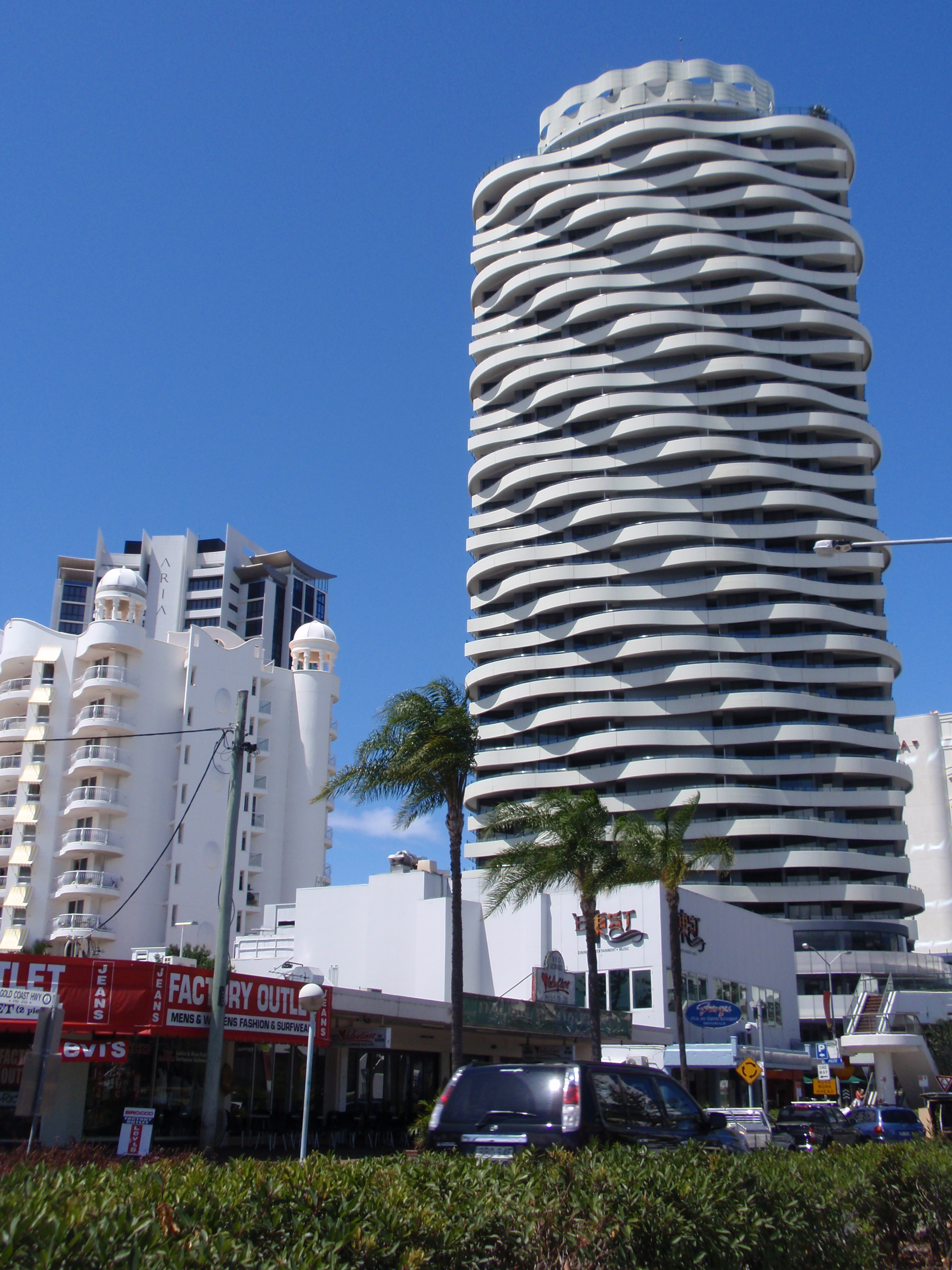

General information
- Status: Completed
- Type: Residential and retail
- Location: Gold Coast, Queensland
- Coordinates: 28°1′43.83″S 153°25′53.52″E
- Opening: 2006
- Cost: A$150 million

Height
- Roof: 111 m (364 ft)

Technical details
- Floor count: 34

Design and construction
- Architect: DBI Design
- Main contractor: Multiplex

The Wave is a residential skyscraper with an unusual appearance on the Gold Coast, Australia. It rises to a height of 111 m (364 ft) and has 34 floors. It is located at the corner of Surf Parade and Victoria Avenue, Broadbeach.

In a competition against 467 new buildings taller than 100 m (330 ft), The Wave was the recipient of the 2006 Silver Emporis Skyscraper Award.

The innovative structure features reinforced concrete balconies that create a flowing, waveform exterior. The design ensures each of the 118 apartment's balconies receive a mix of shade and sunlight. The tower features basement parking, a podium, three levels of commercial space and another level with recreation facilities. One, two and three bedroom apartments a found from floor five above.

In 2007, the building was featured in a Bollywood movie called Singh Is Kinng.

Awards
Preceded by Q1 (building) (Gold Coast)	Emporis Skyscraper Award (Silver); 2005	Succeeded by Newton Suites (Singapore)
