= Oasia =

Oasia may refer to:

== Hotels ==
A brand of hotels operated by Singapore-based Far East Organization

- Oasia Hotel Downtown, a hotel in downtown Singapore, along with Oasia Hotel Novena
- Oasia Resort Sentosa, a resort on Sentosa

== Other ==
- Oasia, a decommissioned ocean liner formerly known as Vistafjord
