= The Met (skyscraper) =

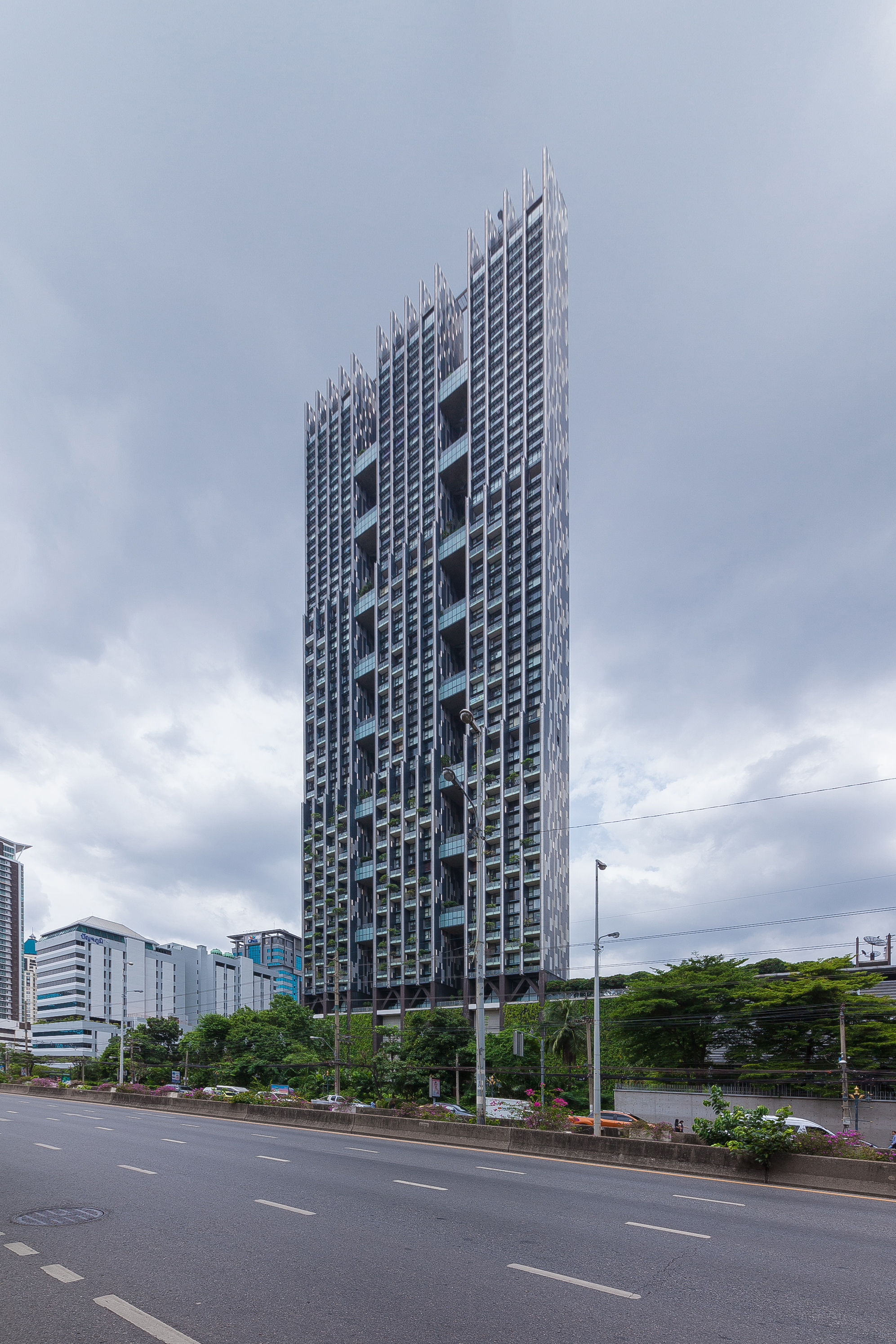
- The Met
- Interactive map of the The Met area

General information
- Type: Residential
- Location: Bangkok, Thailand
- Coordinates: 13°43′19.3″N 100°32′2.9″E
- Construction started: 2005
- Completed: 2009

Height
- Antenna spire: 228.0 metres (748.0 ft)
- Roof: 228.0 metres (748.0 ft)

Technical details
- Floor count: 66

Design and construction
- Architects: WOHA, Tandem Architects
- Awards and prizes: International Highrise Award; 2010

The Met is a 66-story condominium located in Bangkok on Sathorn Road. As of 2012, it was the tallest condominium in Thailand and fourth-tallest building in Bangkok.

== Design ==
The Met has a height of 228 metres and 66 floors. It contains 370 condominium units. It is composed of six towers connected by sky bridges. Sunshades, overhangs, and walls of live greenery filter sunlight and protect interiors from overheating. The gaps between the towers contain terraces with pools and sky gardens. The staggered blocks of the structure's mass are oriented to let the sun pass through the building on its regular course. The apertures through this building are meant to increase the strength of passing breezes and to cool the living units. The architects conceived of this building as a model for high-rise construction in a low-wind tropical climate, reworking the worldwide model developed for cold climates with high winds.

All units are cross-ventilated, leaving residents a viable option to not use air conditioning. Private planters are included in the residents' balconies. The building's location between public transit stations for the BTS Skytrain and MRT systems encourages mass transit use in a city infamous for gridlock.

== Development ==
The project was developed by Pebble Bay (Thailand) Ltd., a subsidiary of the Singaporean company Hotel Properties Limited. Pebble Bay, which acquired the land from the U.S. Information Service in 2003, planned to develop a high-rise condo, The Met, along with a low-rise hotel on the smaller plot in front. The 10-rai land was divided in 2004 into seven rai for The Met and three for the hotel. Pebble Bay abandoned the hotel project in 2016, when it sold the land to PMT Property Co., Ltd., an affiliate of Thoresen Thai Agencies, for THB 1.58 billion. In 2023, the Central Administrative Court revoked PMT's construction permit and environmental impact assessment. In a lawsuit filed by The Met, the court ruled that PMT's proposed development of two buildings with 36 storeys each, named 125 Sathorn, exceeded lawful size limits.

== Awards ==
The Met has won the 2009 Bronze Emporis Skyscraper Award. WOHA, the architectural firm, won the Singapore President's Design Award - Design of the Year 2009 for The Met. In 2010, the Met won the German Architecture Museum's International Highrise Award and was cited for "sustainable living conditions in this tropical region without recourse to air conditioning". The building was the RIBA 2011 Lubetkin Prize winner.

== See also ==
- List of tallest buildings in Thailand
