= Oasia Hotel =

Skyscraper in Singapore

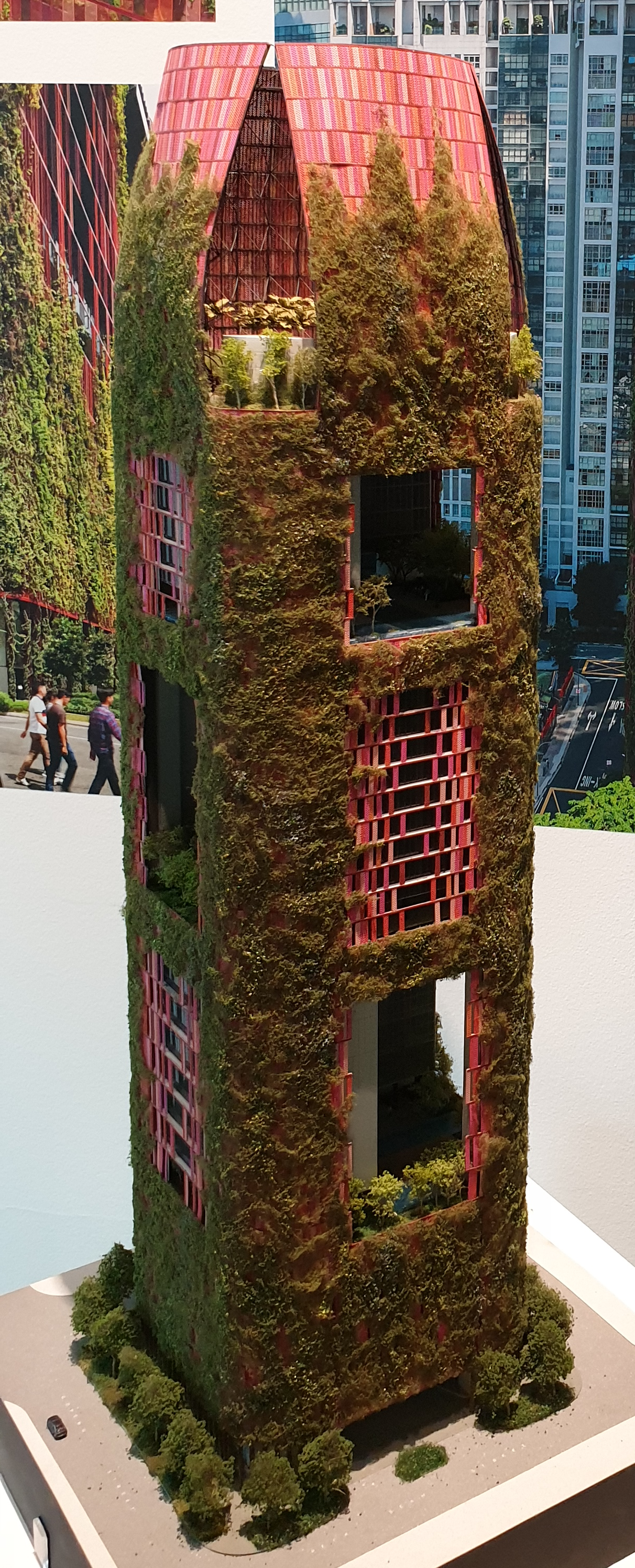
Oasia Hotel Downtown scale model.

There are two Oasia Hotels in Singapore, owned by Far East Hospitality Management.

== Novena ==
Oasia Hotel Novena is an upscale hotel of 428 rooms located in Singapore, managed by Far East Hospitality Management. It is the first hotel in Singapore to feature a direct underpass to an MRT station. Facilities include a 24-hour gym, swimming pool, meeting rooms and spa. The hotel also has a club lounge on the 22nd storey with its own private pool.

== Downtown ==
Oasia Hotel Downtown is a 193-meter skyscraper in the Central Business District (CBD) in Singapore. Designed by the Woha architecture firm and completed in 2016, the tower is characterized by hanging gardens and greenery on the outer facade over 27 floors. The building took 3rd place in the Emporis Skyscraper Award 2016. In 2018 it was one of the five finalists in the Frankfurt International Skyscraper Award together with the eventual winner Torre Reforma as well as Maha Nakhon, Beirut Terraces and Chaoyang Park Plaza.

== Oasia Residence ==
There is also an Oasia Residence which is located at West Coast.
