= RIBA International Award =

The RIBA International Award is the Royal Institute of British Architects' highest award.

The shortlist for the Lubetkin Prize is made up of the winners of the RIBA International Awards.

== Laureates ==
=== 2011 ===
RIBA International award winners in 2011 were:

Building	Location	Architect	Nationality
Masdar Institute	Masdar City, Abu Dhabi; United Arab Emirates	Foster and Partners	United Kingdom
Brain and Mind Research Unit - Youth Mental Health Building University	Sydney; Australia	BVN Architecture	Australia
Guangzhou Opera House	Guangzhou; China	Zaha Hadid Architects	United Kingdom
Iron Market	Port-au-Prince; Haiti	John McAslan + Partners	United Kingdom
Alila Villas Uluwatu	Bali; Indonesia	WOHA	Singapore
Stanislavsky Factory	Moscow; Russia	John McAslan + Partners	United Kingdom
School of the Arts	Singapore	WOHA	Singapore
Galleria Centercity Department Store	Cheonan; South Korea	UNStudio	Netherlands
Laboratory Building	Basel; Switzerland	David Chipperfield Architects	United Kingdom
Loft Gardens	Istanbul; Turkey	Tabanlioglu Architects	Turkey
Boston Museum of Fine Arts	Boston; United States	Foster and Partners	United Kingdom
North College, Rice University	Houston; United States	Hopkins Architects	United Kingdom
Virginia Museum of Fine Arts	Richmond; United States	Rick Mather Architects	United Kingdom

=== 2010 ===
RIBA International award winners in 2010 were:

Building	Location	Architect	Nationality
Spanish 2010 EXPO Pavilion	Shanghai; China	EMBT	Spain
UK 2010 EXPO Pavilion	Shanghai; China	Thomas Heatherwick Studios	United Kingdom
Herning Museum of Contemporary Art	Herning; Denmark	Steven Holl Architects	United States
Unilever Headquarters,	Hamburg; Germany	Behnisch Architekten	Germany
Timberyard Social Housing	Dublin; Ireland	O'Donnell & Tuomey	Ireland
Bras Basah MRT station	Singapore; Singapore	WOHA	Singapore
The Met	Bangkok; Thailand	WOHA	Singapore
Anchorage Museum	Anchorage; United States	David Chipperfield Architects	United Kingdom
Kroon Hall, School of Forestry & Environmental Studies Yale University	New Haven; United States	Hopkins Architects	United Kingdom
Winspear Opera House	Dallas; United States	Foster and Partners	United Kingdom
Carrasco International Airport	Montevideo; Uruguay	Rafael Vinoly Architects	Uruguay/United States
Villalagos	Uruguay	Kallosturin	United Kingdom

=== 2009 ===
RIBA International award winners in 2009 were:

Building	Location	Architect	Nationality
Beijing Station	Beijing; China	Farrell & Partners/Design Institute	United Kingdom/China
Ching Fu Shipbuilding	Kaohsiung; Taiwan	Rogers Stirk Harbour & Partners	United Kingdom
Beijing National Stadium	Beijing; China	Herzog & de Meuron/China Architectural Design & Research Group	Switzerland/China
Beijing Airport Terminal 3	Beijing; China	Foster + Partners	United Kingdom
Cocoon	Zürich; Switzerland	Camenzind Evolution	Switzerland
Saxo Bank Headquarters	Copenhagen; Denmark	3XN	Denmark
Nine Tree Village	Hangzhou; China	David Chipperfield	United Kingdom
European Investment Bank	Luxemburg; Luxembourg	Ingenhoven Architects	Germany
Museum Brandhorst	Munich; Germany	Annette Kisling	Germany
Alto Vetro Tower	Dublin; Ireland	Shay Cleary Architects	Ireland
British High Commission	Colombo; Sri Lanka	Richard Murphy Architects	United Kingdom
Northern Arizona University	Flagstaff; United States	Hopkins Architects	United Kingdom
Maosi Primary School	Qingyang; China	Professor Edward Ng, School of Architecture, Chinese University of Hong Kong	Hong Kong
The Water Cube	Beijing; China	PTW Architects/China State Construction Engineering Corp/China State Construction Engineering Corp/Arup	Australia/China/United Kingdom
Sean O'Casey Centre	Dublin; Ireland	O'Donnell & Tuomey	Ireland

=== 2008 ===
RIBA International award winners in 2008 were:

Building	Location	Architect	Nationality
Akron Art Museum	Akron; United States	Coop Himmelb(l)au	Austria
Casa Kike	Cahuita; Costa Rica	Gianni Botsford Architects	United States
Denver Art Museum	Denver; United States	Adjaye Associates	United Kingdom
Gardiner Museum	Toronto; Canada	Kuwabara Payne McKenna Blumberg Architects	Canada
British High Commission	Kampala; Uganda	FAT	United Kingdom

=== 2007 ===
RIBA International award winners in 2007 were:

Building	Location	Architect	Nationality
Residence at the Swiss Embassy	Washington, D.C. United States	Steven Holl Architects	United States
School of Art and Art History, University of Iowa	Iowa City; United States	Steven Holl Architects	United States
L5 Building, University of New South Wales	Sydney; Australia	Bligh Voller Nield	Australia
Edith Cowan University	Perth; Australia	Jones Coulter Young Architects	Australia
Empire Riverside Hotel	Sana'a; Yemen	Design Engine Architects	United Kingdom
Des Moines Public Library	Des Moines; United States	David Chipperfield Architects	United Kingdom
Hearst Tower	New York City; United States	Foster + Partners	United Kingdom

== See also ==
- List of architecture prizes
