= Skybridge, Chicago =

Condominium building in Chicago, Illinois

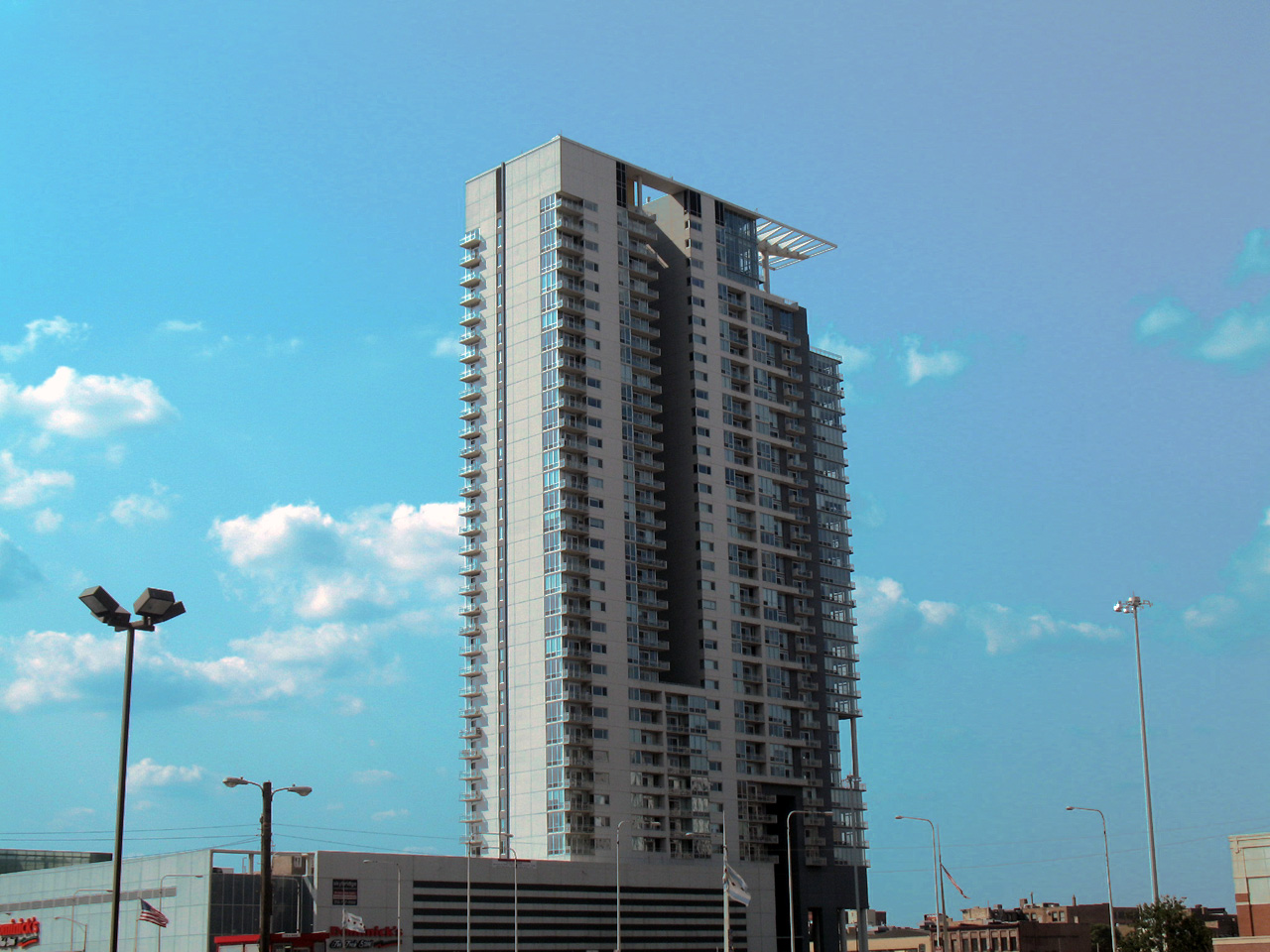
- Interactive map of the Skybridge, Chicago area

General information
- Location: West Loop, Chicago, Illinois, US
- Coordinates: 41°52′57″N 87°38′49″W
- Construction started: 200?
- Completed: 2003

Height
- Roof: 421 ft (128 m)
- Top floor: 407 ft (124 m)

Technical details
- Floor count: 39

Skybridge is a high-rise luxury condominium located in the West Loop of Chicago. It won the 2003 bronze Emporis Skyscraper Award. The base of the building is home to a Whole Foods grocery store. The building climbs to 38 stories, while the top two are home to the penthouses. The 36th floor contains a workout facility for tenants and a rooftop garden space. The building was designed by Perkins and Will.

== See also ==
- List of tallest buildings in Chicago
