= WOHA =

Singaporean architectural firm

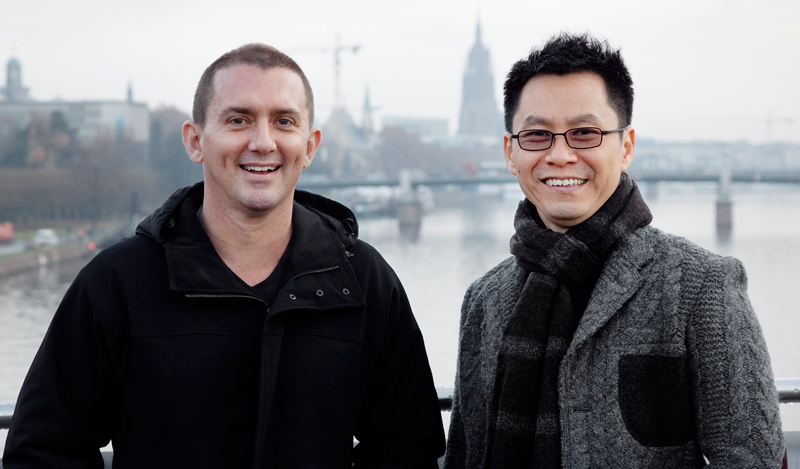
- Left: Richard Hassell; Right: Wong Mun Summ

Practice information
- Founders: Wong Mun Summ; Richard Hassell
- Founded: 1994; 32 years ago
- Location: Singapore

Website
- https://woha.net/

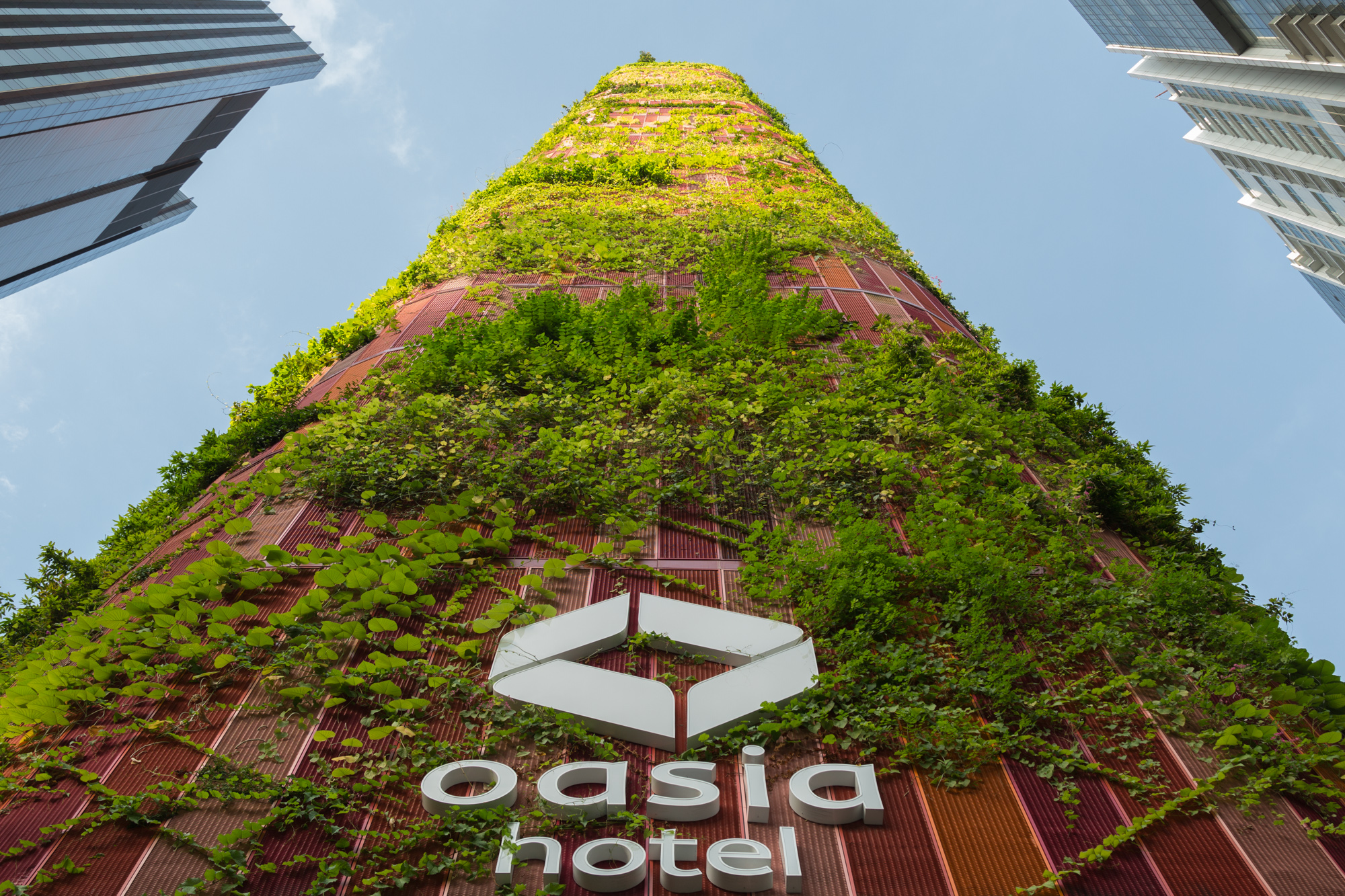
Oasia Hotel Downtown, Singapore 2011-2016

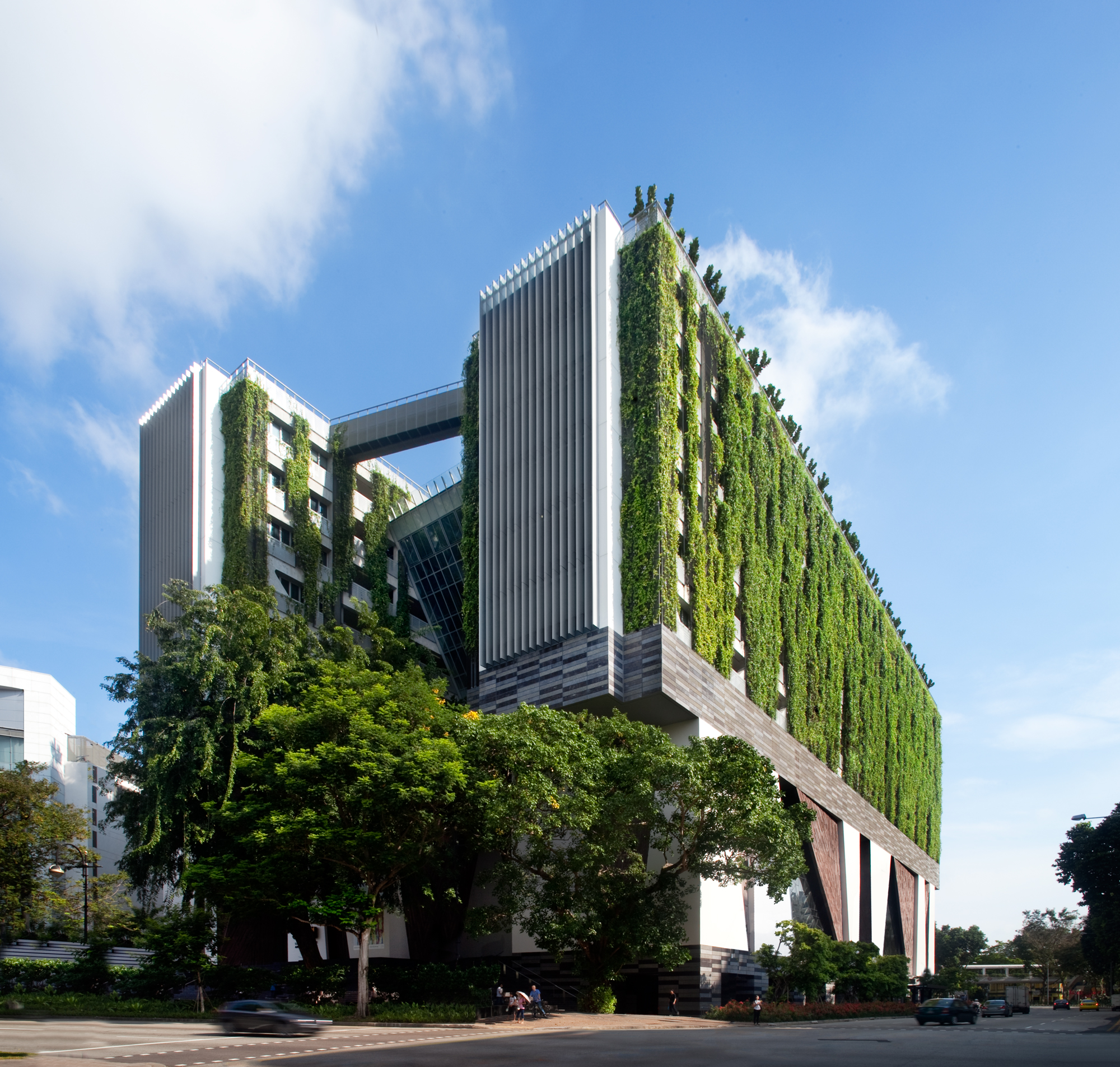
School of the Arts, Singapore 2005-2010

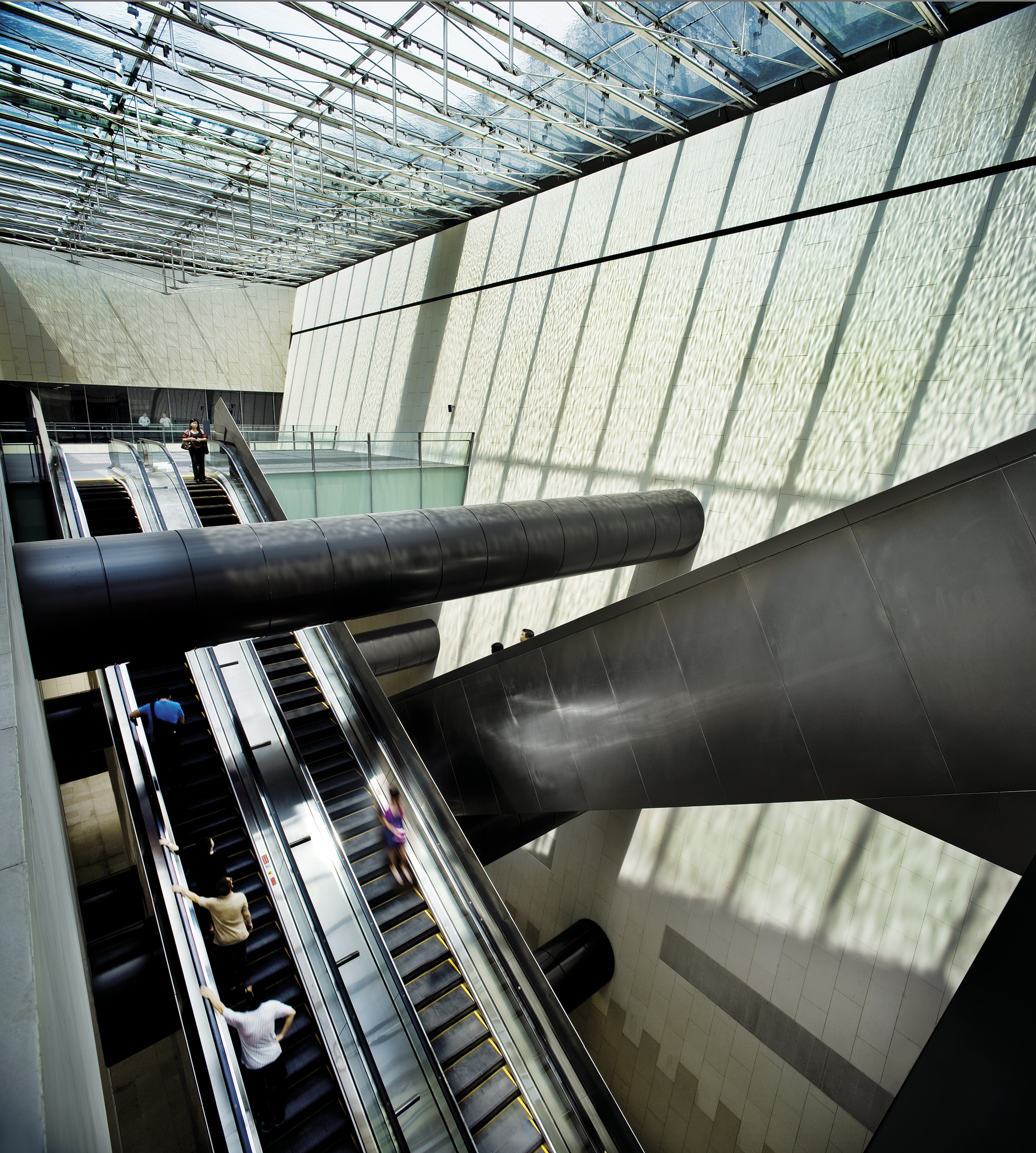
Bras Basah MRT station, Singapore 2000-2008

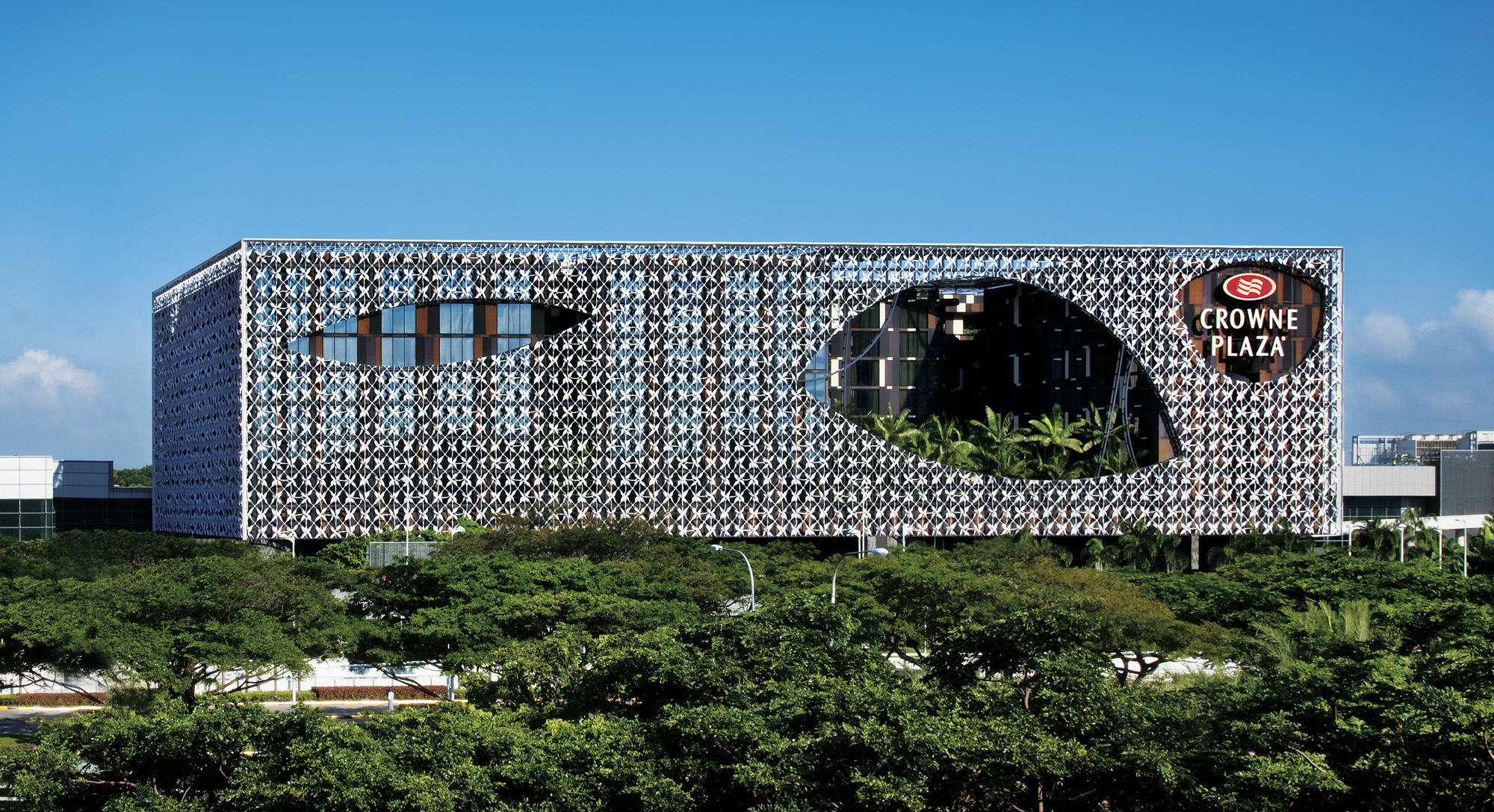
Crowne Plaza Hotel, Changi Airport, Singapore 2005-2008

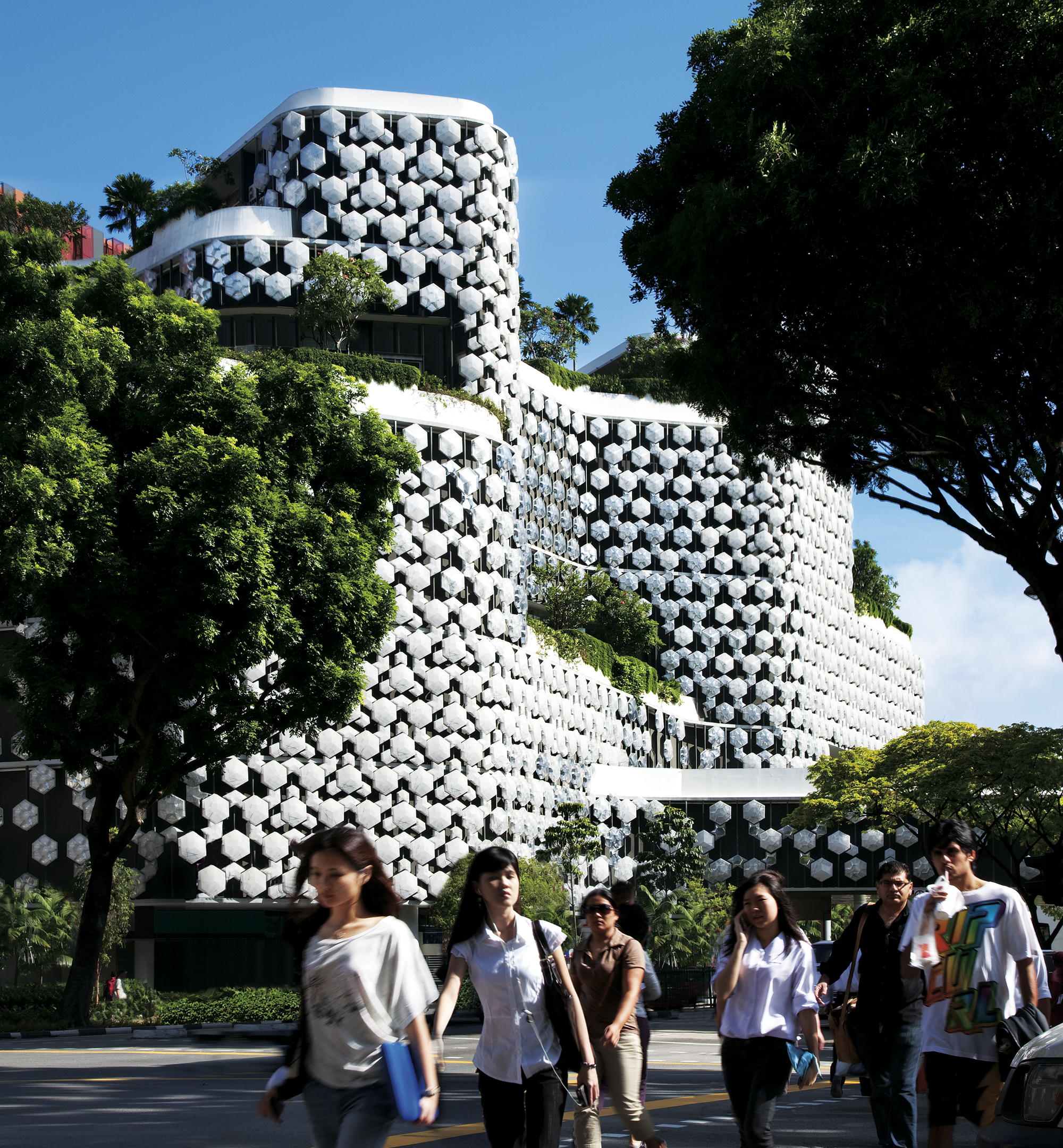
iluma, Singapore 2005-2009

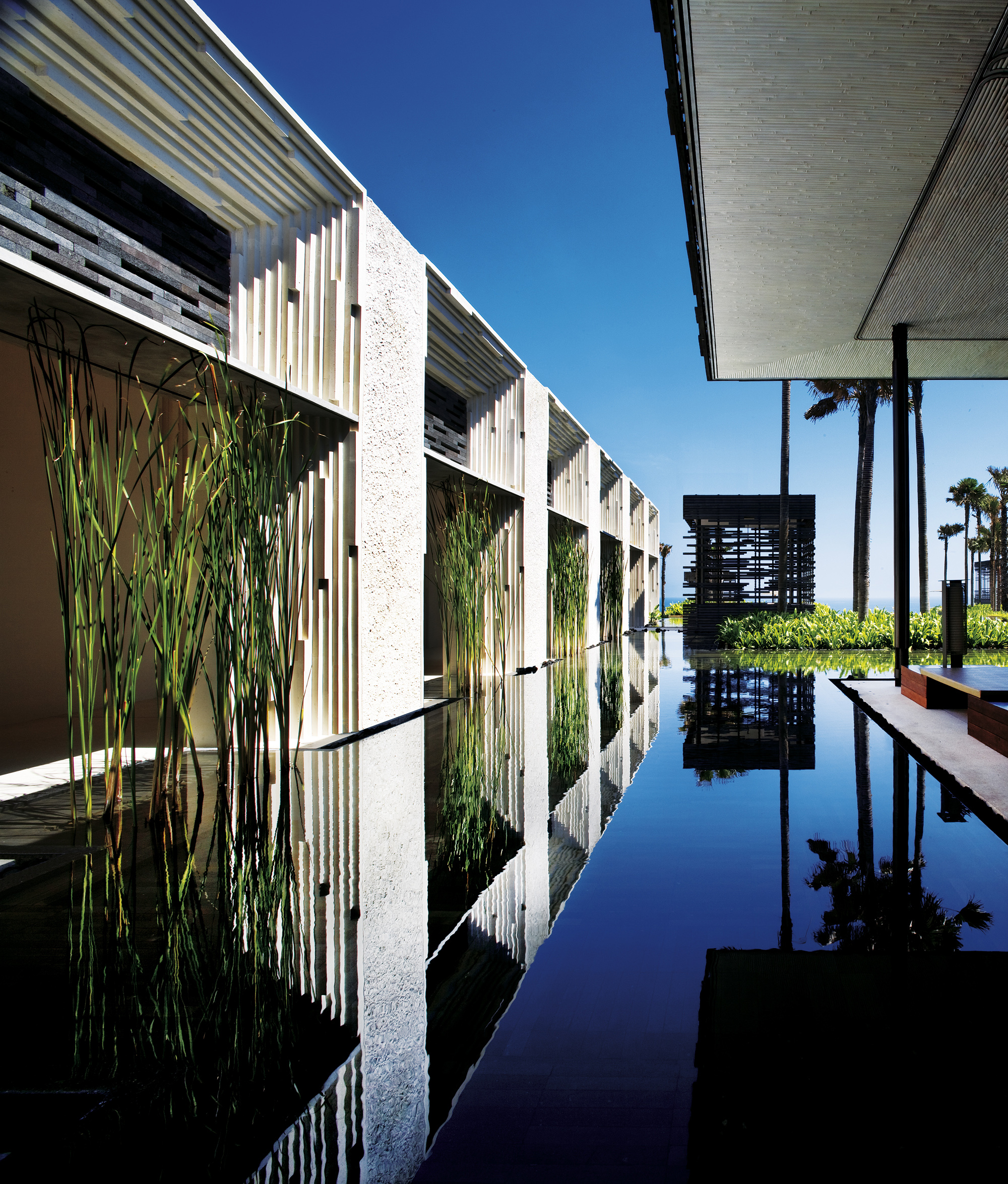
Alila Villas Uluwatu, Bali 2003-2009

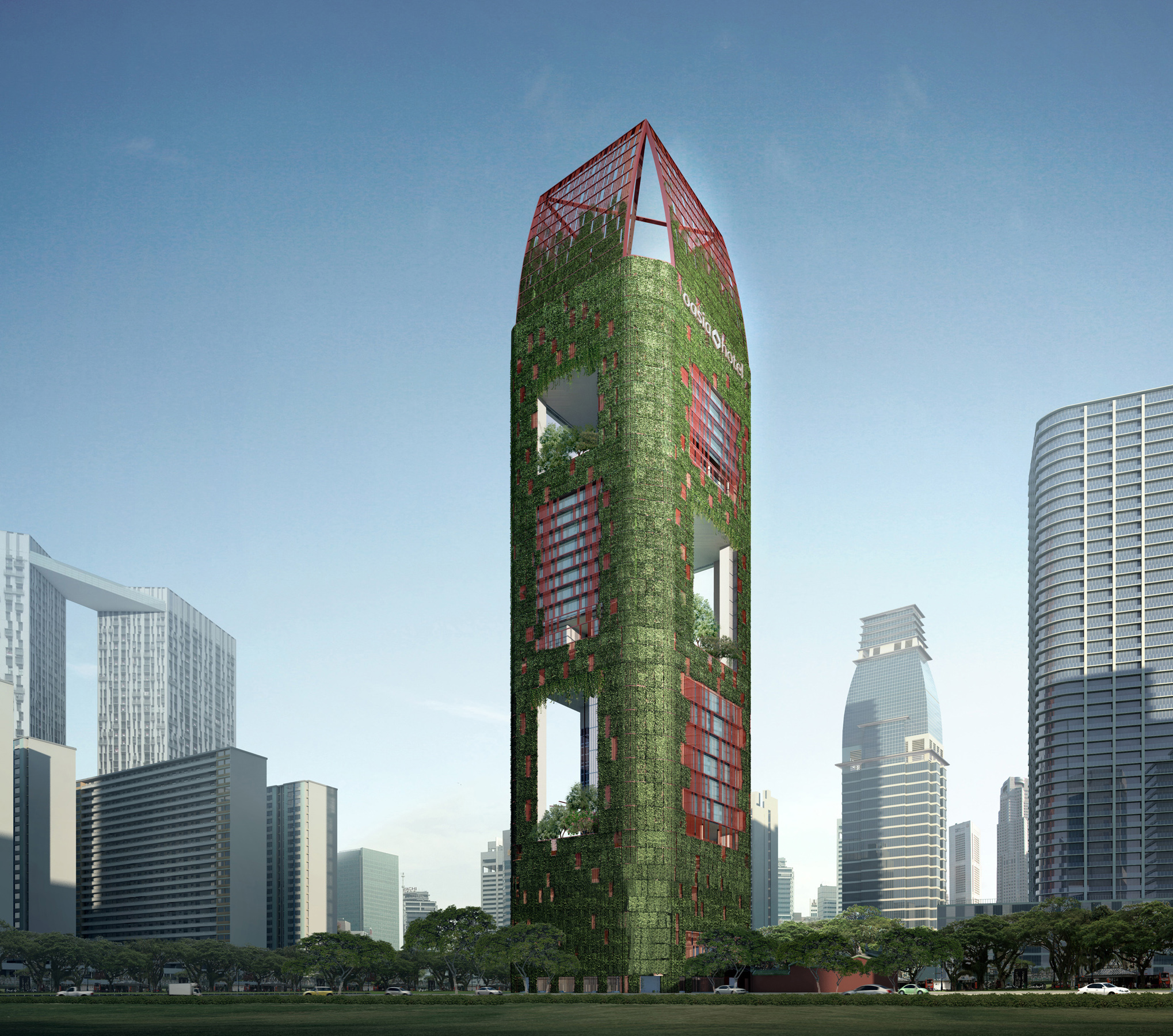
Oasia Downtown, Singapore 2011-2016

WOHA, formerly WH Architects, is a Singaporean architectural and industrial design firm. Established in 1994 by Wong Mun Summ and Richard Hassell, its name is derived from the first two letters of the founders' surnames. Based in Singapore, the firm has designed and completed projects throughout the Asia-Pacific, including residential towers, public housing estates, mass transit stations, hotels and cultural institutions.

Their work incorporates sustainable design strategies as a response to climate change and widespread urbanization. They aim to integrate landscape, architecture and urbanism in high-rise buildings to improve quality of life for residents in high-density megacities. Their buildings are notable for their extensive use of natural vegetation as a building element.

In 2007, they came to international attention when their 1 Moulmein Rise condominium in Singapore was awarded the Aga Khan Award for Architecture, establishing their reputation as designers of sustainable, naturally ventilated skyscrapers for an urban tropical context. In addition to architectural practice, WOHA have also taught at the National University of Singapore and both Hassell and Wong have lectured at universities around the world.

== History ==
Wong and Hassell met while employed at Kerry Hill Architects in Singapore, and worked for five years before going on to found their own practice, WOHA, in 1994. Their practice began with designing private houses. Following their success in winning two open competitions for Mass Rapid Transit (MRT) stations in 2000 (Bras Basah MRT station and Stadium MRT station) and the success of the 1 Moulmein Rise condominium, the firm shifted its focus to public and commercial architecture.

According to the firm, a defining moment in the development of their design approach came with the entry for the Duxton Plain Public Housing International Competition held by Singapore's Urban Redevelopment Authority in 2001. Although WOHA's entry was not selected for construction, it was awarded the Merit Prize, and allowed them to experiment with design strategies for environmentally and socially sustainable high-density developments that would inform their later work. The ideas would later influence the design for the Skyville @ Dawson public housing estate.

WOHA subsequently completed a number of high-rise and large public buildings that were designed to be sustainable for tropical climates. These open, permeable designs encouraged natural ventilation to reduce reliance on mechanical cooling. They are also characterized by the extensive use of planting to cool the structure through transpiration, an approach that the firm has described as “breathing architecture”.

In 2007, WOHA completed Newton Suites, a condominium complex in Singapore with landscape covering an equivalent of 130% of the site area.

In 2009, the firm completed the School of the Arts campus in Singapore and The Met residential tower in Bangkok. The Met raised the international profile of the firm outside of South-East Asia, winning international awards such as the 2010 International Highrise Award and 2011 RIBA Lubetkin Award. The building was characterized as an example of sustainable high-density development for tropical megacities. The RIBA jury noted that the building offered an alternative to glazed skyscrapers common in temperate climates and made clear "that an alternative strategy to the sleek air-conditioned box can work in the tropics and has implications everywhere."

WOHA has experimented with developing new types of green skyscrapers. The Parkroyal on Pickering, completed in 2013, incorporates 15,000 square meters of elevated terraced gardens, which the architects refer to as “sky gardens”. The Oasia Hotel Downtown, completed in 2016, features a façade of aluminium mesh that supports over 50 species of plants. The vertical landscaping of these structures is intended to reintroduce greenery to the built environment and encourage urban bio-diversity by attracting local birds and insects.

The SkyVille @ Dawson public housing estate, completed in 2015, provided WOHA with an opportunity to realize their ideas about housing first articulated in the Duxton Plains competition. According to the firm, SkyVille @ Dawson incorporates design strategies that are intended to promote community living. Communal terraces are provided every eleven stories to create clusters of 80 homes, referred to as “Sky Villages.” The building’s rooftop contains a publicly accessible park.

The scale of WOHA’s projects are intended to respond to the population growth of Asian cities, and also an outcome of Singapore's constrained geographic area. Wong has stated that the goal of WOHA’s architecture is to create "comfortable garden suburb experience and then replicate it vertically through a megastructure for everyone to enjoy." WOHA present their high-density housing designs as replicable models for urban development. However, critics have questioned the universal applicability of this model outside of Singapore's communitarian political system and coordinated urban planning program.

At the 2016 Venice Architecture Biennale, WOHA launched a book called Garden City Mega City, written in collaboration with Patrick Bingham-Hall. The book outlines WOHA’s design strategies in the context of the threats posed by global warming and the pace of Asian urbanization.

In 2018, Kampung Admiralty was completed, an integrated development that houses apartments for seniors, a rooftop park and urban farm, a medical centre, childcare and eldercare, retail, as well as food and beverage outlets. The project was named "World Building of the Year" at the 2018 World Architecture Festival.

WOHA completed the design of the Punggol Digital District masterplan, a 50-hectare development in Punggol, and Singapore's first Enterprise District in 2018. The first phase, which includes Singapore Institute of Technology Campus Heart, also designed by WOHA, completed construction in 2025.

In August 2019, WOHA was chosen by URA as the designer of Singapore's Pavilion for World Expo 2020 in Dubai. The firm designed a green oasis on a 1,550 square-meter site in the Expo's Sustainability District.

In July 2020, WOHA was selected to redevelop the Marina Bay floating platform, which will be renamed "NS Square" when completed in 2027.

== Awards ==
- 2007 Aga Khan Award for Architecture for 1 Moulmein Rise
- 2009 World Architecture Festival, World Housing Development of the Year for The Met
- 2009 World Architecture Festival, World Transport Building of the Year for Bras Basah MRT station
- 2010 World Architecture Festival, World Learning Building of the Year for School of the Arts
- 2010 World Architecture Festival, World Holiday Building of the Year for Alila Villas Uluwatu
- 2010 The International Highrise Award for The Met
- 2011 Australian Institute of Architects, Jørn Utzon Award for International Architecture for School of the Arts
- 2011 RIBA International Award for Alila Villas Uluwatu
- 2011 RIBA International Award for School of the Arts
- 2011 RIBA Lubetkin Prize for The Met
- 2017 Prix Versaille for Oasia Hotel Downtown
- 2018 World Architecture Festival, Building of the Year foro Kampung Admiralty
- 2020 Prix Versaille for Design Orchard
- 2020 World Expo Dubai, Architecture and Landscape Category, Gold award for Singapore Pavilion
- 2024 Prix Versaille for Pan Pacific Orchard
- 2025 RIBA Middle East Award for Singapore Pavilion, World Expo 2020

== Significant Built Works ==
- Church of St Mary of the Angels, Singapore, 1999-2003
- Newton Suites, Singapore, 2003-2007
- Crowne Plaza Changi Airport, Singapore, 2005-2008
- Stadium MRT station, Singapore, 2000-2008
- Bras Basah MRT station, Singapore, 2000-2008
- The Pano, Bangkok, Thailand, 2004-2009
- Iluma (now known as Bugis+), Singapore, 2005-2009
- Alila Villas Uluwatu, Bali, Indonesia, 2003-2009
- The Met, Bangkok, Thailand, 2003-2010
- School of the Arts, Singapore, 2005-2010
- Parkroyal on Pickering, Singapore, 2010-2013
- Enabling Village, Singapore, 2015
- Skyville @ Dawson, Singapore, 2015
- Oasia Hotel Downtown, Singapore 2011-2016
- Kampung Admiralty, Singapore, 2014 - 2017
- Sky Green, Taichung, Taiwan, 2015 - 2019
- Design Orchard, Singapore, 2017 - 2019
- Singapore Pavilion, World Expo 2020, Dubai, United Arab Emirates, 2021
- The Hedberg, Hobart, Australia, 2021
- BRAC University, Dhaka, Bangladesh, 2017-2023
- Pan Pacific Orchard, Singapore, 2023
- 443 Queens Street, Brisbane, Australia, 2023
- 21 Carpenter, Singapore, 2023
- Punggol Digital District, Singapore, 2018-2025
- Singapore Institute of Technology Campus Heart, Singapore, 2019-2025
- The Reserve Residences, Singapore (under construction)
- NS Square, Singapore (under construction)
- NoMad Hotel, Singapore (under construction)
