= Pan Pacific Orchard =

Hotel skyscraper in Singapore

- Hotel chain: Pan Pacific Hotels and Resorts

General information
- Type: Hotel
- Location: 10 Claymore Road; Singapore 229540
- Coordinates: 1.307469°N 103.829896°E
- Opened: June 2023

Height
- Height: 140 metres (460 ft)

Design and construction
- Architecture firm: WOHA

Other information
- Number of rooms: 343
- Public transit: NS22 TE14 Orchard MRT station

Website
- www.panpacific.com/en/hotels-and-resorts/pp-orchard-sg.html

Pan Pacific Orchard is a hotel in Singapore located on Claymore Road, Orchard, Singapore. Opened in June 2023, it is part of the Pan Pacific Hotels and Resorts chain. Designed by WOHA Architects, It is 140 m high and has four open-air terraces, named Forest, Beach, Garden and Cloud. The hotel has 343 rooms and suites.

In 2024, the hotel won the award for the world's best new tall building from the Council on Tall Buildings and Urban Habitat.
