= Pan Pacific Singapore Hotel =

Hotel skyscraper in Singapore

Pan Pacific Singapore
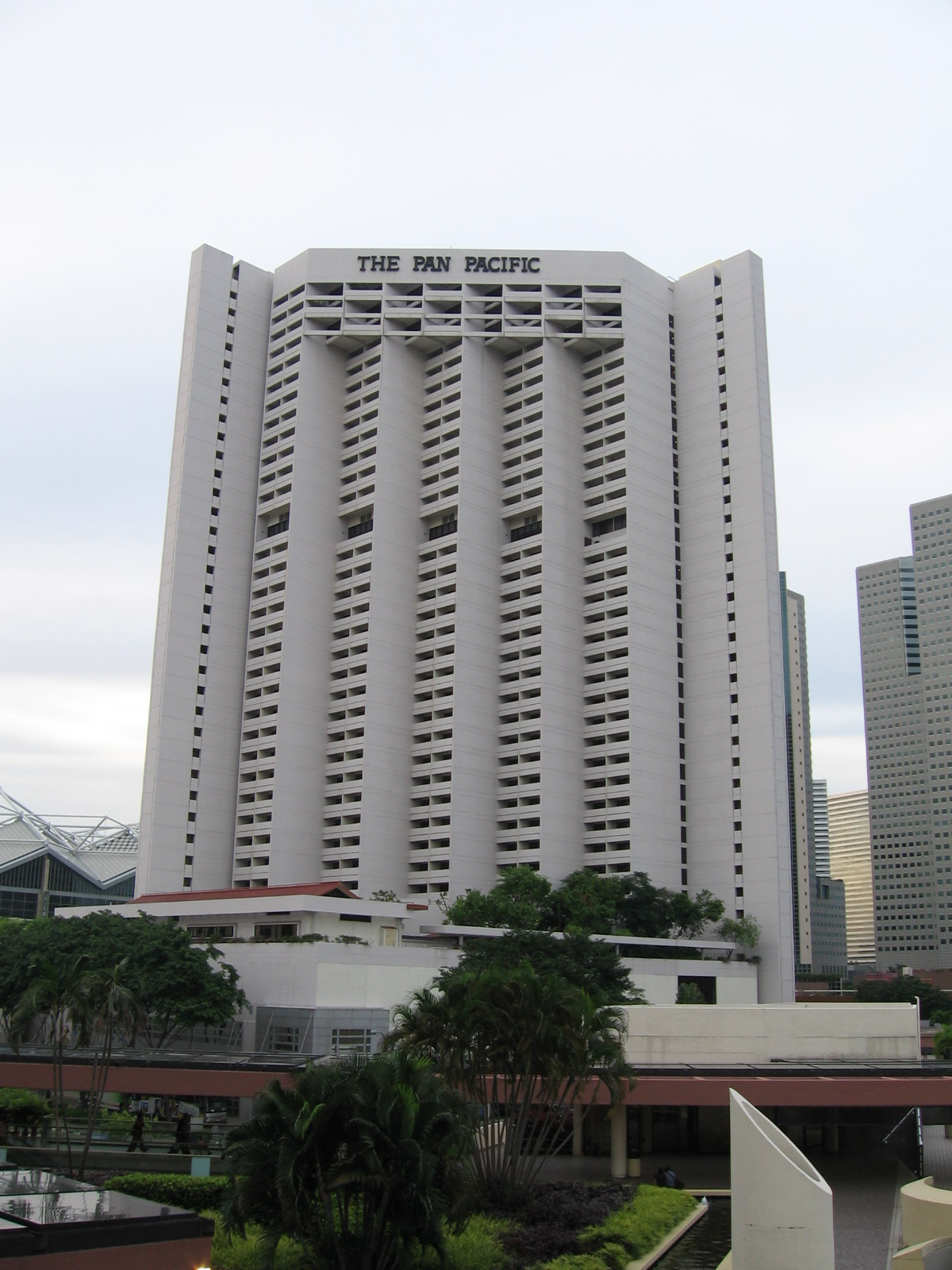

General information
- Status: Open
- Type: Hotel
- Architectural style: Modernism
- Location: Downtown Core, Central, Singapore
- Coordinates: 1.2924°N 103.8584°E
- Construction started: 1984
- Completed: 1986
- Owner: Pan Pacific Hotels

Technical details
- Floor count: 37; 1 below ground
- Lifts/elevators: 4 interior and 4 exterior

Design and construction
- Architects: John Portman & Associates; DP Architects Pte Ltd
- Developer: Singapore Land

Other information
- Number of rooms: 790 rooms and suites

Website
- singapore.panpacific.com

Pan Pacific Singapore is a hotel located in Marina Centre, Singapore, operated by the Pan Pacific Hotels and Resorts. With 38 floors, it is the tallest of the three hotels which are part of the Marina Square development, the other two being the Parkroyal Collection Marina Bay and Mandarin Oriental Singapore. The hotel has 790 rooms and suites, arranged around an atrium extending 35 floors of the building.

The hotel was renovated in 2005 and again in 2012. It features a lounge in the atrium. All the guest lifts are bubble lifts in this hotel. The low-rise lifts serve 1 through 22, and face the interior of the hotel. The high-rise lifts located opposite the low-rise lifts serve 22 through 35 and 38, and are outdoor observation lifts.

== 2012 transformation ==
The hotel completed its four-month transformation and had a soft opening on 31 August 2012. It has been in full operation as of October 2012.

Level 37 of this hotel was renamed as Level 38, and Hai Tien Lo restaurant gave up its place at the top of the hotel and moved down to Level 3. The Pacific Club, which is the hotel's club lounge, took the restaurant's former location.

== Events ==
The hotel was one of the main venues for Singapore 2006, hosting the Program of Seminars in its meeting rooms.

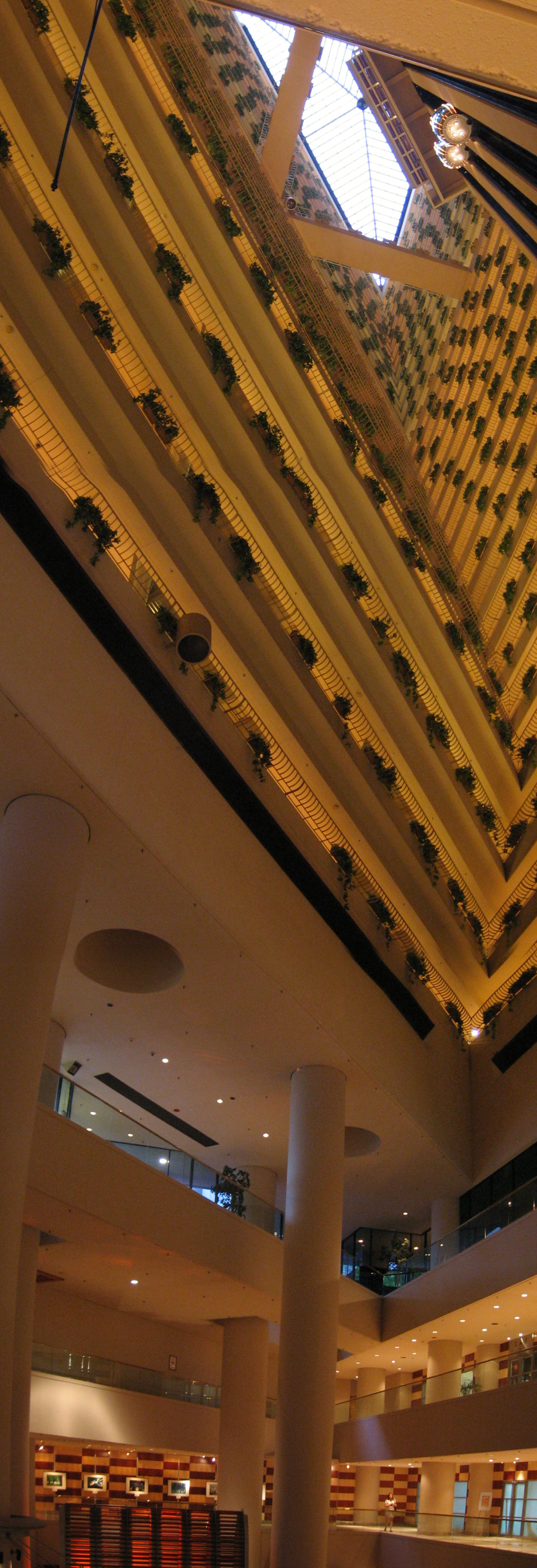
Atrium of the Pan Pacific Singapore

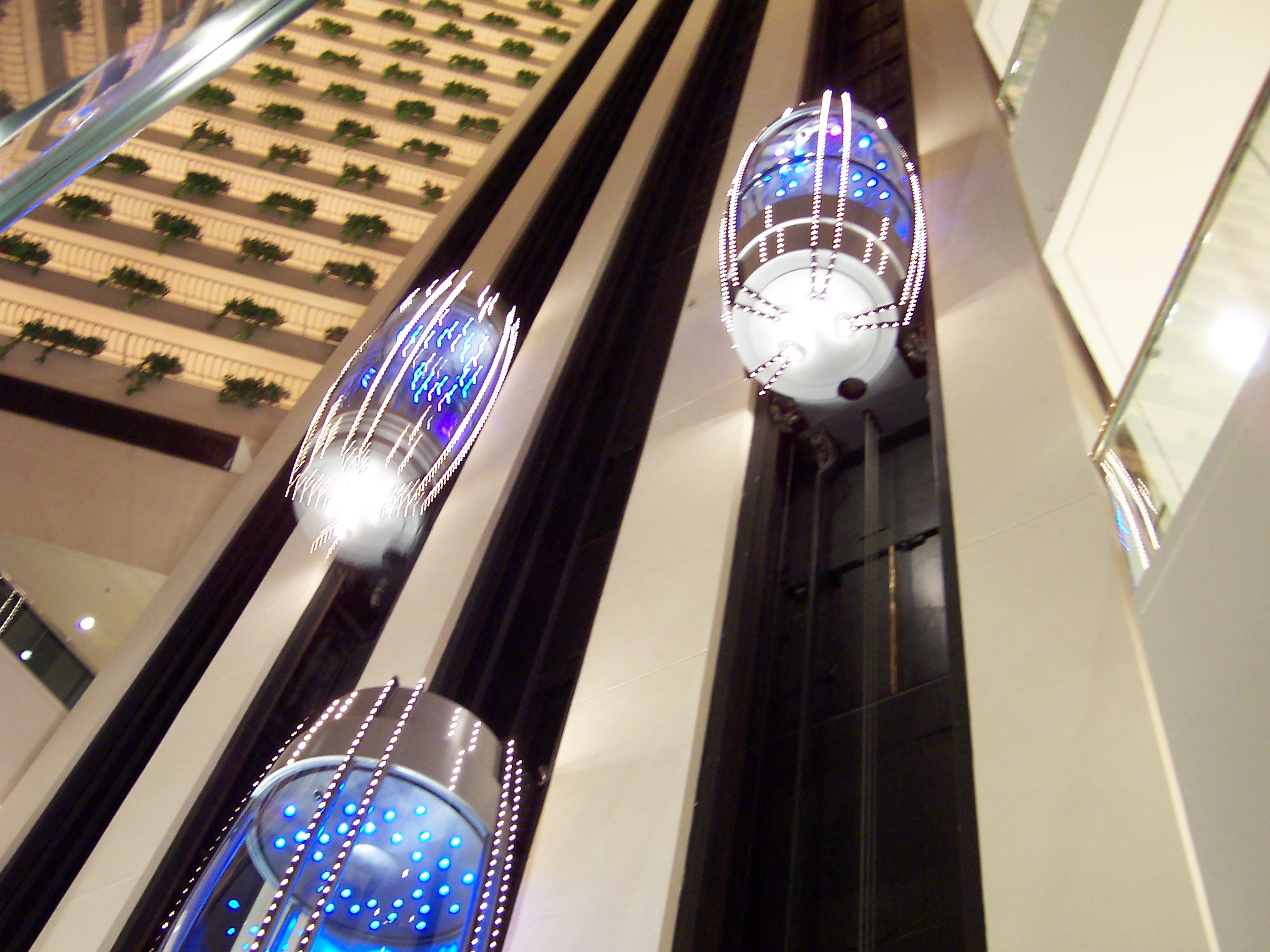
Interior elevators at the Pan Pacific Singapore

The shooting of the Hindi film De Dana Dan took place in the hotel.
