= Parkroyal Collection Pickering =

Hotel in Downtown Core, Singapore

Coordinates: 1.285777°N 103.846476°E

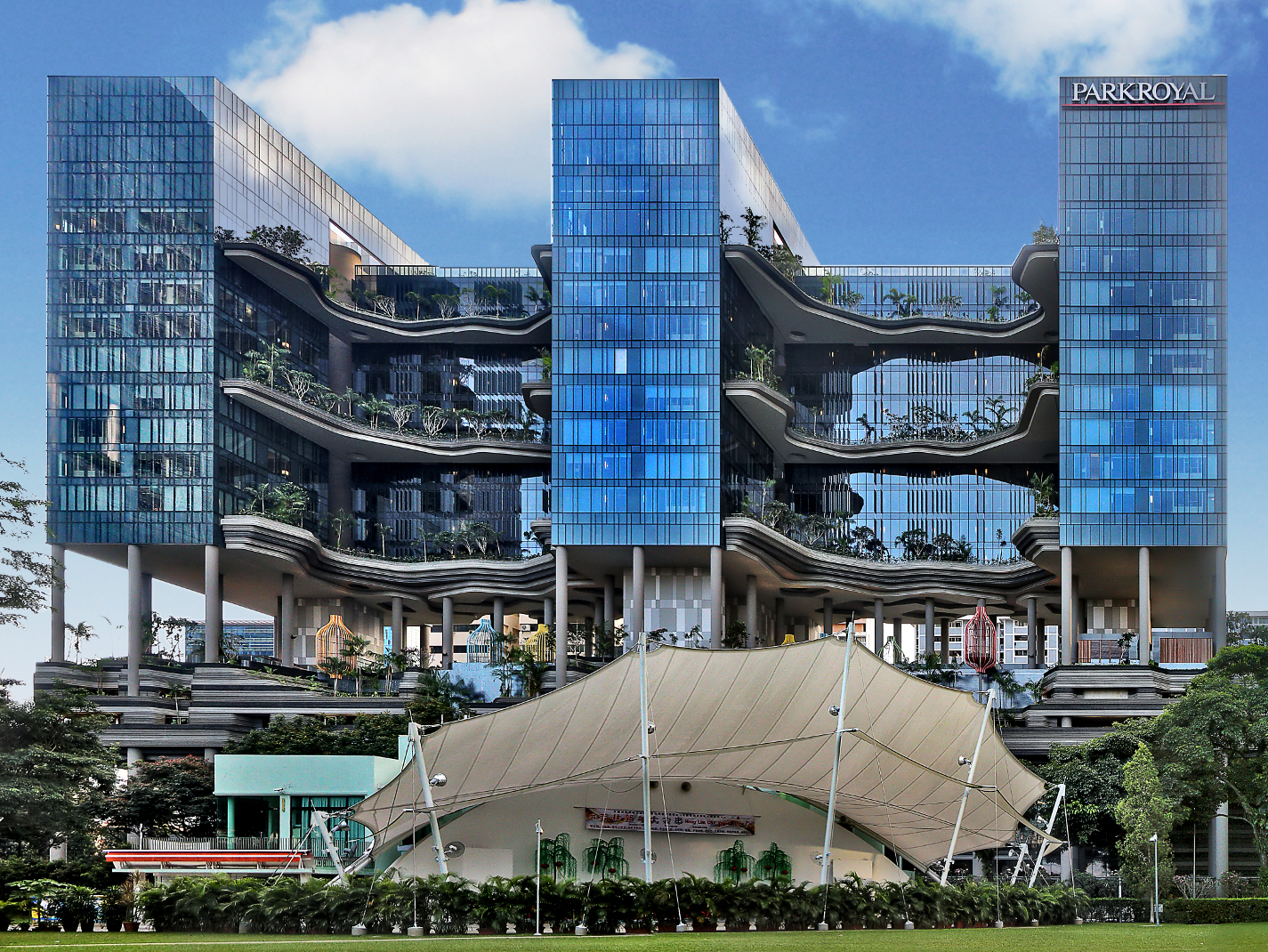

General information
- Status: Completed
- Location: Downtown Core, Singapore, 3 Upper Pickering Street, Singapore 058289
- Construction started: December 2009
- Completed: 2013
- Opening: January 2013
- Owner: UOL Group Ltd
- Operator: Pan Pacific Hotels Group

Height
- Height: 89 m (292 ft)

Technical details
- Floor count: 16
- Floor area: 29,812 m^{2} (320,890 sq ft)
- Lifts/elevators: 15

Design and construction
- Architecture firm: WOHA
- Structural engineer: TEP Consultants Pte Ltd
- Services engineer: Beca Group

Other information
- Number of rooms: 367
- Number of restaurants: 1
- Parking: 104

Website
- Official website

Parkroyal Collection Pickering, Singapore (formerly known as PARKROYAL on Pickering), is a luxury five-star hotel located in Singapore's Central Area. It is owned by the Singaporean investment and property development company UOL Group.

== History ==
Construction of the hotel started in December 2009. The building was completed and opened in January 2013. At the time of its opening, it was named PARKROYAL on Pickering. It was later renamed as Parkroyal Collection Pickering in January 2020.

== Architecture ==
The hotel was designed by WOHA, a Singapore-based architecture firm. It was designed as a hotel-as-garden. It includes green walls, water features, and 15,000 m^{2} of tiered "sky gardens". The building is claimed to be self-sustaining and designed to consume minimal energy with the use of solar cells, motion sensors, rainwater harvesting and reclaimed water.

The twelve-storey tower sits atop a five-storey podium and is shaped to ensure all rooms face either the park or internal sky gardens. Services and corridors are placed on the southern side. The building’s form and nearby structures provide shading, allowing for fully glazed façades with low-emissivity glass and no need for external screening.

== Facilities ==
The hotel has 367 rooms and suites.

== Awards ==
- 2013 INSIDE World Festival of Interiors – Best Interior Design (hotels category)
- 2013 World Architecture News (WAN) Awards – Hotel of the Year
- 2013 President's Design Award – Design of the Year
- 2014 Australian Institute of Architects International Chapter Architecture Awards – International Architecture Award (commercial category)
- 2014 German Design Council Iconic Awards – Best of Best Award (public category)
- 2014 Good Design Award – Green Good Design Award
- 2015 CTBUH Skyscraper Award – Urban Habitat Award
- 2015 Singapore Experience Awards – Business Event Venue of the Year
- 2016 Singapore Institute of Architects (SIA) Architectural Design Awards – Design Award (commercial category)
