= Simose Art Museum =

Museum of art in Ōtake, Hiroshima, Japan

- 下瀬美術館
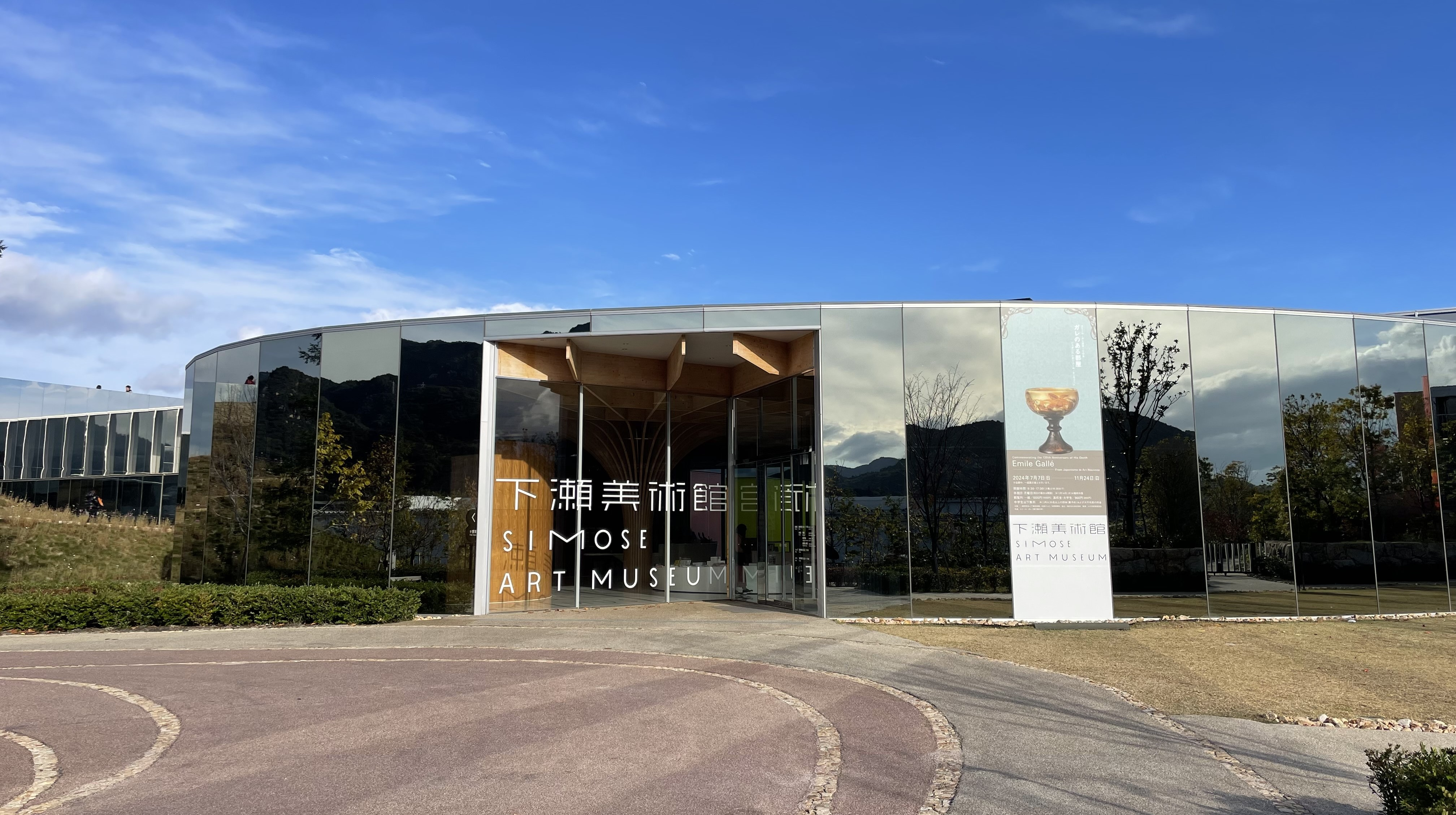
- Interactive map of the Simose Art Museum area

General information
- Location: 2-10-50 Harumi, Ōtake, Hiroshima Prefecture, Japan
- Coordinates: 34°14′29″N 132°13′37″E
- Opened: March 2023

Design and construction
- Architect: Shigeru Ban

Website
- Official website

Simose Art Museum (下瀬美術館, Shimose Bijutsukan) opened in Ōtake, Hiroshima Prefecture, Japan in 2023. The collection includes hina and other Japanese dolls, glassware by Émile Gallé, and paintings by Pissarro, Rousseau, Matisse, Chagall, Saeki Yūzō, Kishida Ryūsei, Léonard Foujita, Yokoyama Taikan, and Kayama Matazō. In December 2024, the Museum, designed by architect Shigeru Ban, and on a site overlooking Itsukushima and the Seto Inland Sea, was awarded the Prix Versailles as the "world's most beautiful museum".

== See also ==
- Hiroshima Prefectural Art Museum
