= Pan Pacific Suzhou =

Hotel in Suzhou, China

- 苏州吴宫泛太平洋酒店
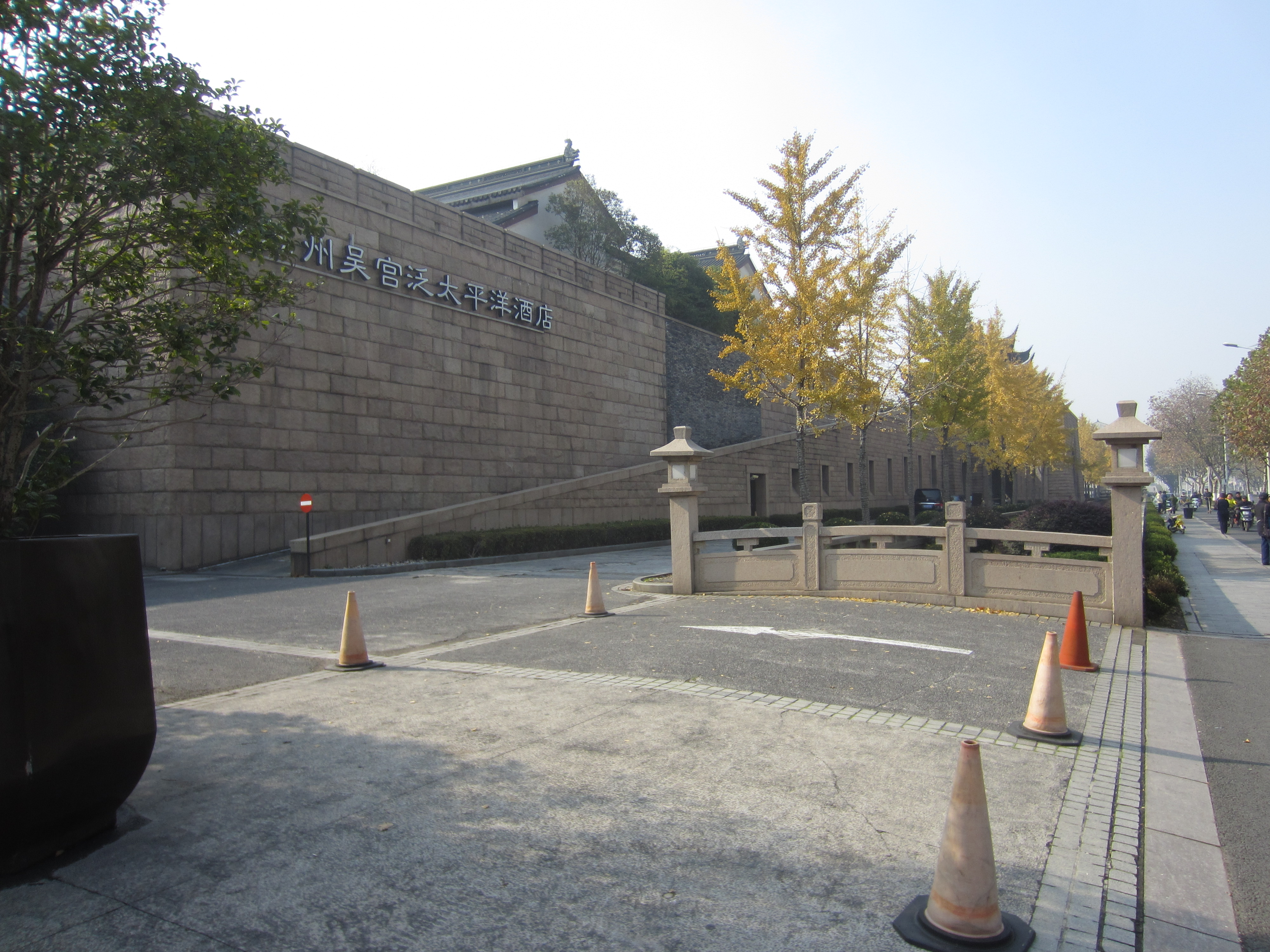

General information
- Location: 259 Xinshi Road, Suzhou, China
- Opened: 1996

The Pan Pacific Suzhou (Chinese: 苏州吴宫泛太平洋酒店) is a luxury hotel located at 259 Xinshi Road (新市路259号) in Gusu District, Suzhou, China. Part of the Pan Pacific Hotels and Resorts chain, the hotel neighbors Pan Gate.
