= Design Orchard =

Shopping centre in Singapore

Design Orchard is a two and a half storey integrated retail and incubation space located on Orchard Road, Singapore.

== Design ==
Design Orchard was developed by JTC Corporation and designed by WOHA. One of the most prominent features is a terraced public rooftop.

The building is built from a minimal material palette of Béton brut concrete, glass, timber and plants. One interesting feature of the structure are the porthole windows, which allow light, views, and ventilation through the raw concrete walls.

== Facilities ==
=== Retail space ===
The ground floor retail space was spearheaded by the Singapore Tourism Board, operated by Naiise, and houses 61 Singaporean brands. Brands include Plain Vanilla Bakery, fragrance label Oo La Lab, clothing brand Yacht 21, handbag line Ling Wu, The Animal Project, and Jewels Rock Sugar Sticks.

=== Incubation spaces ===
At level 2 & 3, co-working spaces known as 'The Cocoon Space' is spearheaded by Enterprise Singapore and operated by the Textile and Fashion Federation of Singapore serve to incubate emerging design talent.

=== Public space ===
The rooftop of the building is open to the public and is sloped to create an amphitheatre and includes ample green spaces.
