= Kampung Admiralty =

Kampung Admiralty is Singapore's first integrated retirement community project by Housing and Development Board. It integrates housing for the elderly with a wide range of social, communal, healthcare, commercial, and retail facilities. It was designed by WOHA. The project was completed in late 2017 and it was officially opened in May 2018.

== Geography ==
Kampung Admiralty is an 11-storey complex of two residential blocks of about 100 studio apartments. The Kampung Admiralty was officially opened on 12 May 2018.

== Facilities ==
- Community plaza - ground floor
- Pharmacy - ground floor
- 900-seater hawker centre - Level 2
- Admiralty Medical Centre - Level 3 and Level 4. It provides residents with specialist care and day surgery, and is run by Khoo Teck Puat Hospital
- Community garden - Level 9

== Accolades ==
- 2016 World Architecture Festival: Best Commercial Mixed-Use Future Project award
- 2018 International Chapter Architecture Awards: Commendation for commercial architecture
- 2018 World Architecture Festival: Building of the Year
