= Pan Pacific Hotels and Resorts =

Singaporean luxury hotel chain

- Type: Subsidiary
- Industry: Hospitality
- Headquarters: Singapore
- Number of locations: 40 (2018)
- Brands: Pan Pacific Hotels and Resorts, PARKROYAL Hotels and Resorts
- Parent: UOL Group
- Website: www.panpacific.com

The Pan Pacific Hotels and Resorts (泛太平洋酒店及度假村) is a hospitality company headquartered in Singapore and founded in 1975. It is a subsidiary of developer UOL Group and operates more than 20 luxury hotels, resorts and serviced suites across Asia, North America, Oceania, and Europe.

== History ==
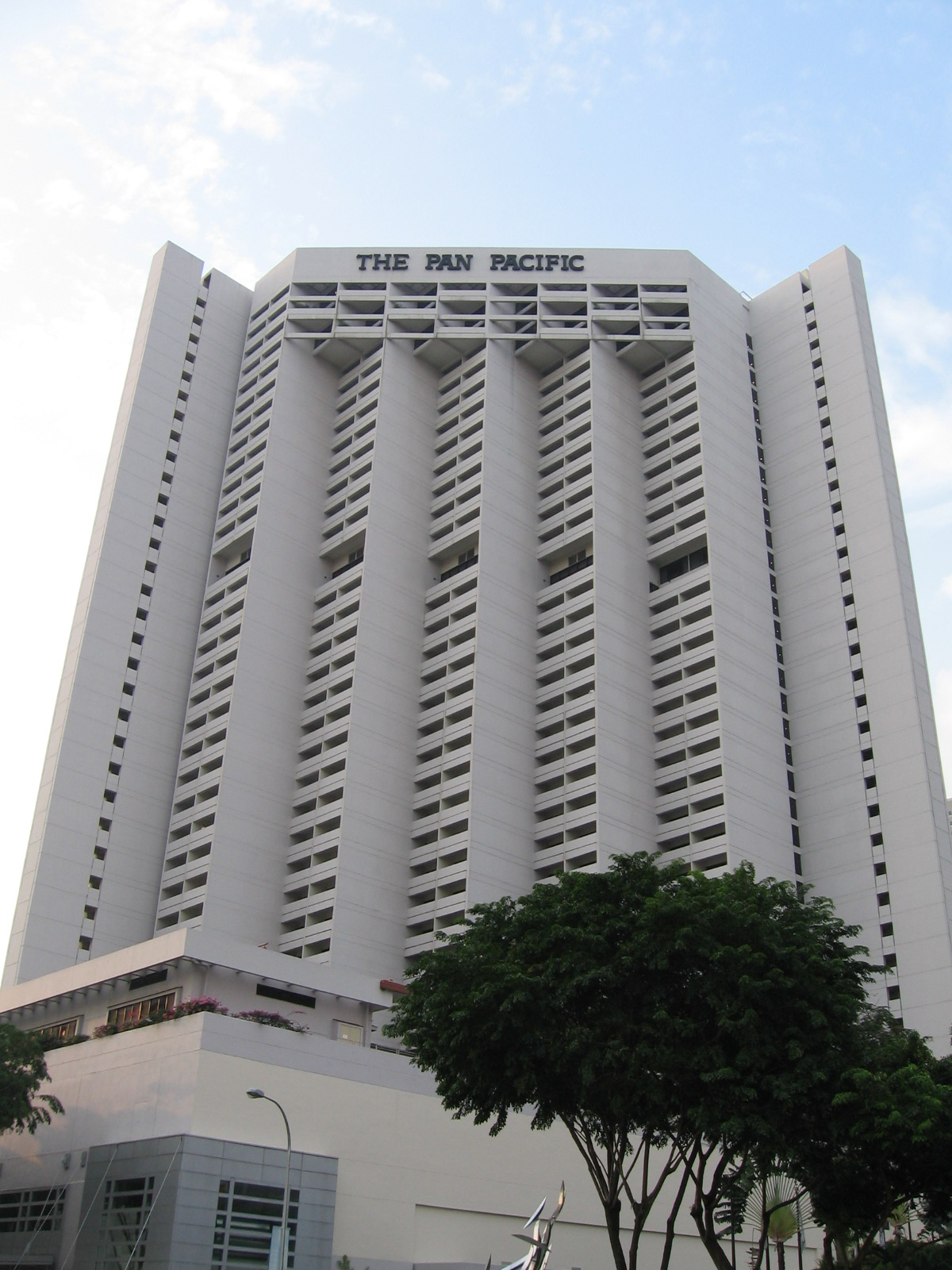
Pan Pacific Singapore Hotel

The brand name "Pan Pacific Hotels" was born when Japanese conglomerate Tokyu Group established its new marketing identity and sales network for its hotels in 1975, under Tokyu Hotels International. The first Pan Pacific hotel established was Sari Pan Pacific (now Sari Pacific Jakarta, Autograph Collection) in Jakarta, which was opened in 1976.

It established the Emerald Management Company (EMC) to manage its hotels in Hawaii and California in 1983, and in the same year, the Traveller's Palm logo was born. In 1986, Pan Pacific Vancouver and Pan Pacific Singapore were opened. Tokyu Hotels International and EMC merged to become Pan Pacific Hotels and Resorts, and in 1989, the Traveller's Palm logo became the company-wide mark for the hotel group.

In 2007, UOL Group Limited acquired Pan Pacific Hotels and Resorts from Tokyu, and renamed it to Pan Pacific Hotels Group. In 2007, Pan Pacific Hotels and Resorts became a founding member of the Global Hotel Alliance, the world's largest alliance of independent hotel brands comprising more than 30 member brands with over 550 upscale and luxury hotels with 110,000 rooms across 76 countries.

== Properties ==
=== Hotels ===
Pan Pacific Hotels and Resorts has since extended its presence to other parts of Asia and North America, including Beijing, Dhaka, Kuala Lumpur, Kota Kinabalu, Melbourne, Singapore, Vancouver, Whistler, Hanoi and Seattle. Its Anaheim location, built in 1984, was acquired by The Walt Disney Company in 1995, and subsequently integrated into the Disneyland Resort as Disney's Paradise Pier Hotel.

The group also owns the Parkroyal Hotels & Resorts brand, it focuses on providing a comfortable and convenient urban hotel experience, designed for travelers who want to feel the city's pulse while enjoying the comforts of a well-appointed hotel, it has presence in Alor Gajah (Melaka), Bangkok, George Town (Penang), Ho Chi Minh City, Jakarta, Kuala Lumpur Langkawi, Melbourne, Nay Pyi Taw, Parramatta, Singapore, Shinjuku (Tokyo), Sydney, Yangon. Its sub-brand is Parkroyal Collection, which is described to be more eco-friendly and sustainable than the original brand, as the hotels feature biophilic design, integrating natural elements into the hotel environment with initiatives like urban farming, its presence currently in Kuala Lumpur and Singapore with three hotels, included the Parkroyal Collection Kuala Lumpur, the Parkroyal Collection Marina Bay, Singapore and the Parkroyal Collection Pickering.

=== Serviced suites ===
The hotel group also operates serviced suites in both Pan Pacific and Parkroyal brands. In 2008, the brand launched its first extended-stay property with Pan Pacific Serviced Suites Orchard, Singapore. In 2010, it opened Pan Pacific Serviced Suites Bangkok and in 2013, Pan Pacific Serviced Suites Beach Road, Singapore, welcomed its first guests.
