= Oasia Hotel Downtown =

Skyscraper in Singapore

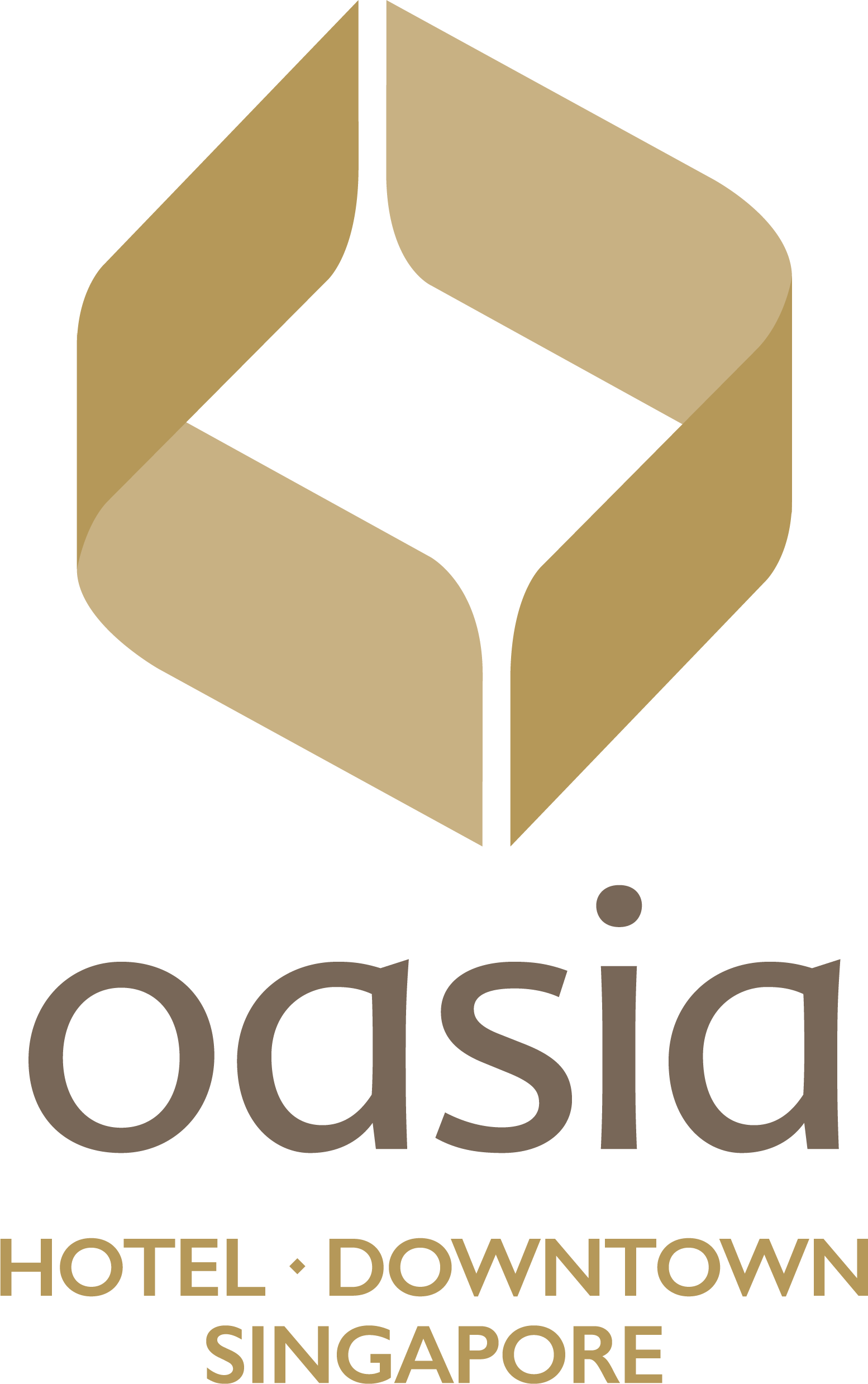

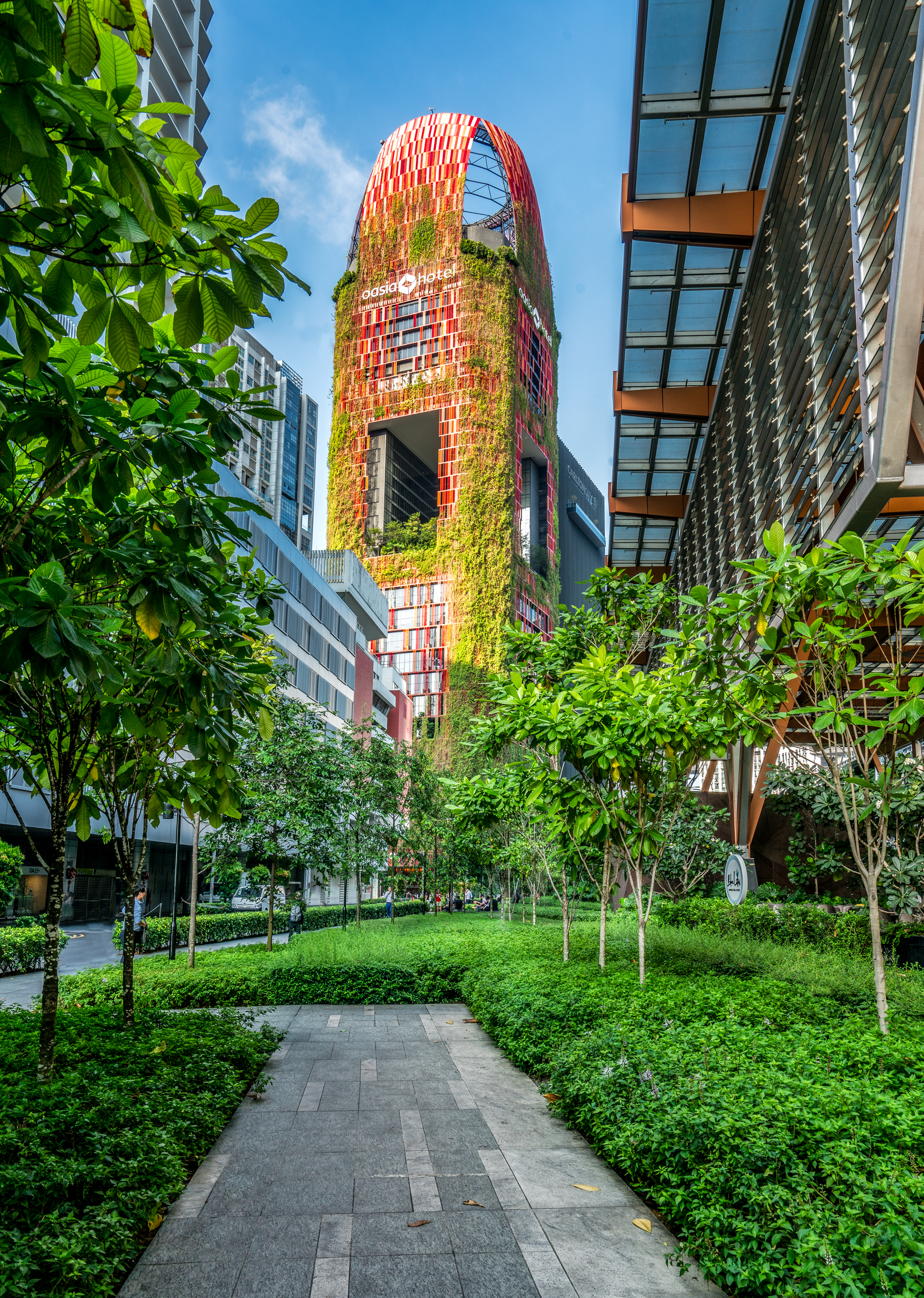
- Interactive map of the Oasia Hotel Downtown area

General information
- Status: Completed
- Type: Mixed-use; Office; Hotel
- Location: Tanjong Pagar, Central Business District, Singapore, 100 Peck Seah St, Singapore 079333
- Coordinates: 1.2758°N 103.8420°E
- Construction started: 2012
- Completed: 2016
- Cost: $138 million
- Owner: Far East Organization

Height
- Top floor: 193.3 m (634 ft)

Technical details
- Floor count: 27
- Floor area: 19,416 m^{2} (208,990 sq ft)
- Lifts/elevators: 13

Design and construction
- Architect: WOHA
- Engineer: KTP Consultants Private Limited
- Services engineer: Rankine&Hill (S) Private Limited
- Main contractor: Woh Hup Pte Ltd

Oasia Hotel Downtown is a 27-story mixed-use hotel and office skyscraper in the Downtown Core district of Singapore. It is part of the Oasia Hotel brand managed by Far East Hospitality Management. Its exterior includes 21 species of climbing plants on its facade. The building's exterior, constructed atop vertical grid panels, will appear more "furry" over time, with only specks of its orange, pink and maroon aluminium mesh exterior remaining visible. About 40 percent of the building's volume consists of communal green space elevated vertically into the skyscraper.

The building was designed by the architectural firm WOHA and developed by the Far East Organization. It opened in April 2016. It received the 2018 award for "Best Tall Building in the World" from the Council on Tall Buildings and Urban Habitat.

== Concept and design ==
The goal for the design of this structure was to create a response to the concrete uniformity of Singapore's business district. The primary architect, Wong Mun Summ of Woha, said that the building emphasized sustainability over consumption. Mimicking a natural ecosystem, vertically planted flowers and vines attract fauna like insects and squirrels. Furniture and interiors for the building were designed by Spanish architect and designer Patricia Urquiola. In all, the building has about 60 levels worth of green walls which are overlaid onto the building's red facade.

In addition, four communal sky gardens are cut into the building, allowing for natural ventilation of the public spaces in lieu of air conditioning. Plants, trees and water features in the elevated gardens also attract wildlife, including insects and birds. The building, which replaced a park, provides about ten times the greenery of the previous site area. Approximately 40 percent of the building's volume is dedicated to open-air sky terraces. About 18 species of wildlife have been attracted to the building, comparable to nearby parks, according to a biodiversity study conducted by BioSEA.

The building sites on a 50 meter by 50 meter plot of land. It has a barrel-shaped roof, whose facade does not contain climbing vines. The intent of the design is to mimic a bouquet with a green stem once the creepers on the building's facade are fully-grown.

No mechanical ventilation is needed for the hotel rooms or offices because of the open-sided sky gardens. Water for irrigation of the plant life comes from rainfall.

== Awards ==
Since its completion, the building has received a number of architectural recognition from different bodies.

In 2017, it received a Green Good Design Award from the European Centre for Architecture Art Design and Urban Studies and the Chicago Athenaeum, a Singapore Good Design Mark Platinum award from the Design Business Chamber Singapore, and was also named Building of The Year at the Singapore Institute of Architects Architectural Design Awards. The hotel was also the recipient of the Urban Land Institute's 2017-2018 Global Awards for Excellence. The hotel won for its facade which is filled with greenery and stood out among Singapore's concrete, steel, and glass buildings.

In 2018, the Council on Tall Buildings and Urban Habitat gave the building the year's Best Tall Building Worldwide honour, as well as the Best Tall Building Asia and Australasia. The building was the recipient of the Design of the Year 2018 award conferred by The President*s Design Award (P*DA), Singapore’s highest honour for designers and designs across all disciplines.

A postage stamp depicting the hotel was issued by the Singapore Post in 2021, as part of a commemorative set themed after Singapore buildings with prominent terraced or vertical gardens.

== See also ==
- List of tallest buildings in Singapore
