= Parkroyal Collection Marina Bay, Singapore =

Hotel skyscraper in Singapore

PARKROYAL COLLECTION Marina Bay, Singapore
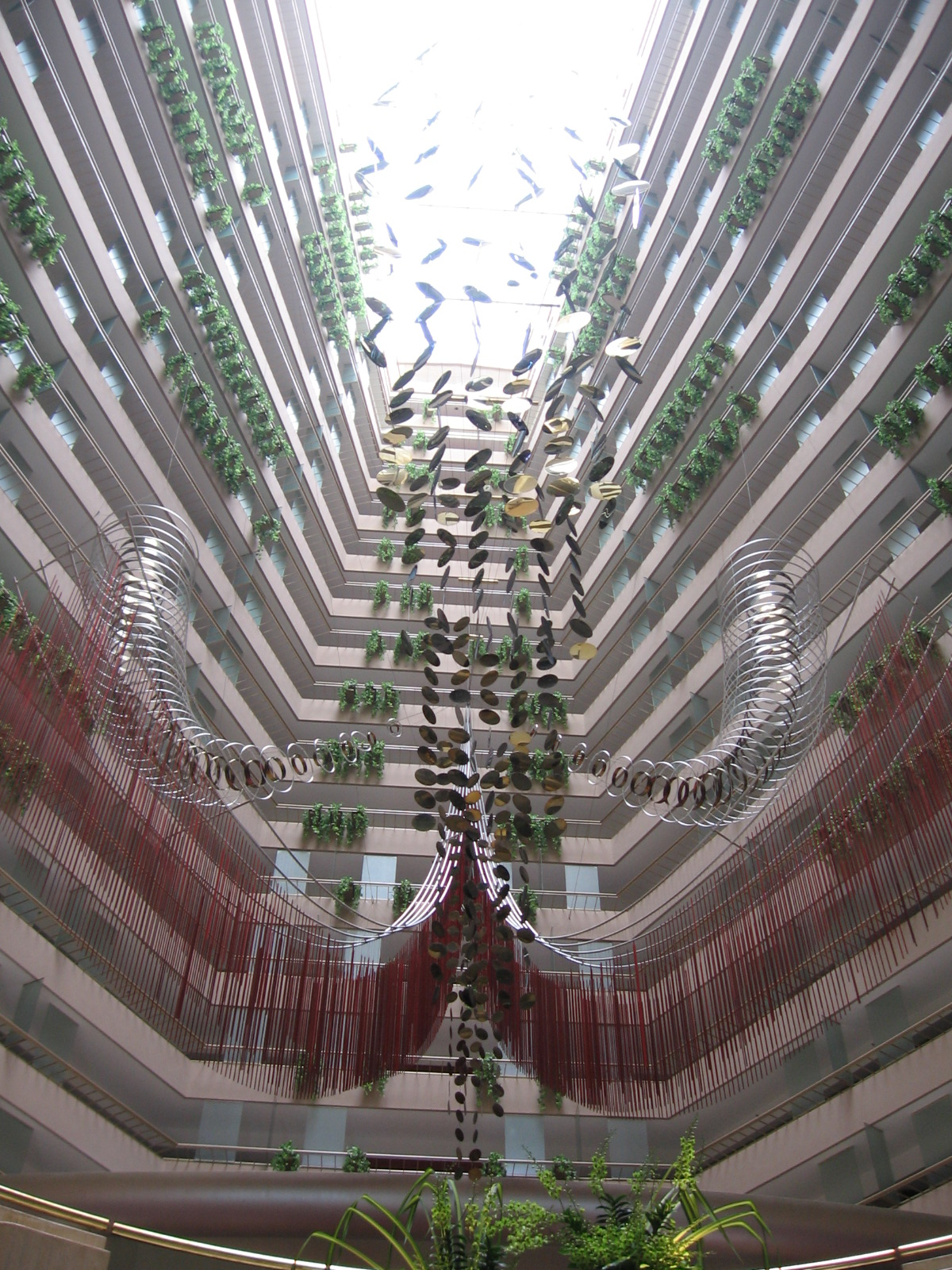
- Atrium at the former Marina Mandarin Singapore
- Interactive map of the PARKROYAL COLLECTION Marina Bay, Singapore area

General information
- Location: Singapore, Raffles Boulevard, Marina Centre, Downtown Core, Singapore
- Coordinates: 1.2917°N 103.8568°E
- Opening: 1987
- Owner: Pan Pacific Hotels Group
- Operator: Pan Pacific Hotels Group

Technical details
- Floor count: 21 and 1 basement

Design and construction
- Architects: John Portman & Associates; DP Architects Pte Ltd
- Developer: Singapore Land

Other information
- Number of rooms: 583
- Number of suites: Executive Deluxe Suites
- Number of restaurants: AquaMarine; Atrium Lounge & Senses Patisserie; Peach Blossoms

Website
- PanPacific.com

The PARKROYAL COLLECTION Marina Bay, Singapore (formerly Marina Mandarin Singapore) is a five-star luxury hotel located on Raffles Boulevard in the Marina Centre complex, in the Downtown Core of Singapore.

== Hotel ==
Designed by John Portman, the hotel has one of the largest open atriums in Southeast Asia, which rises through 21 levels and is permeated by natural light. Each of the 575 rooms is accessed from the balconies overlooking the atrium, and has views of the Singapore harbour and the city skyline.
