= Prix Versailles =

Architectural award

- Awarded for: Architecture and design
- Venue: UNESCO Headquarters
- Presented by: Secretariat of the Prix Versailles
- First award: 2015
- Website: Official website

The Prix Versailles is a series of international awards given annually in the field of architecture. Founded in 2015, it recognizes outstanding achievements in architectural and interior design. The awards are presented annually with UNESCO.

== Background ==
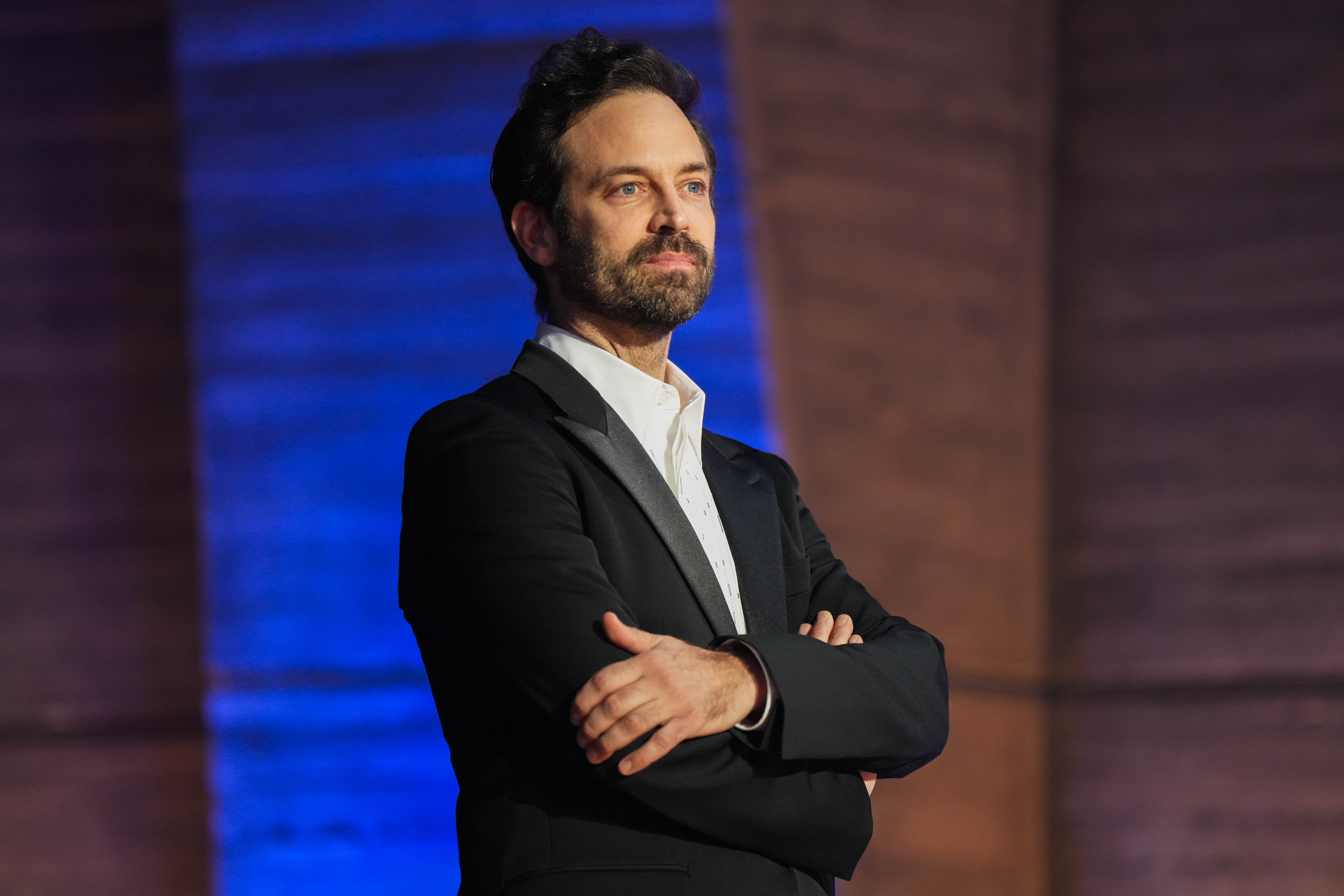
2024 World Jury chair Benjamin Millepied presenting at the 2024 Prix Versailles.

The Prix Versailles was first given at the UNESCO Headquarters in Paris, France in 2015. In the beginning, it has focused primarily on commercial buildings hotels, restaurants and in its first year was awarded to French achievements which included Galeries Lafayette, Brasserie des Haras, Repetto Charonne, and Musée des Confluences Shop. It opened up to international locations beginning in 2016 and the following year added shopping centres. In 2019, it added college and university campuses, stations, and sporting venues and added airports in 2020.

The organizer of the award has stated that the award aims to highlight "the role that economic actors can play, in all sectors, in the beautification and improvement of living conditions." Consideration is also given to sustainable development and how it integrates into overall design of the structure.

Winners of the award have include the Simose Art Museum, Zayed International Airport, and Nanyang Technological University.
