= Newton Suites =

Residential skyscraper in Singapore

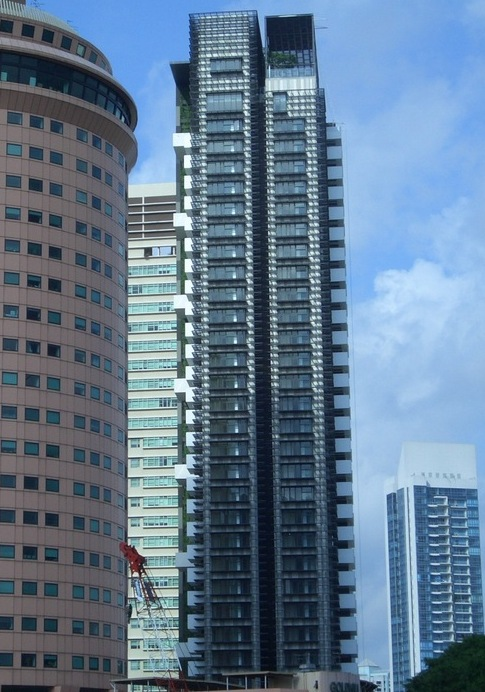
- Interactive map of the Newton Suites area

General information
- Status: Completed
- Type: Residential
- Architectural style: High-rise
- Location: Newton, Singapore
- Coordinates: 1°19′04″N 103°50′32″E
- Construction started: 2004
- Completed: 2007

Technical details
- Floor count: 36

Design and construction
- Architect: WOHA Architects
- Developer: UOL Development (Novena) PTE LTD

Newton Suites is a residential skyscraper in Newton Road, Singapore, designed by WOHA Architects. It has a height of 120 metres with 36 floors. Each floor has two two-bedroom and two three-bedroom apartments. The top floor contains two penthouses. The building features several sky gardens. The condominium has a security post, basement car park and a swimming pool.
