= Phloen Chit BTS station =

Skytrain station in Bangkok, Thailand

Phloen Chit เพลินจิต
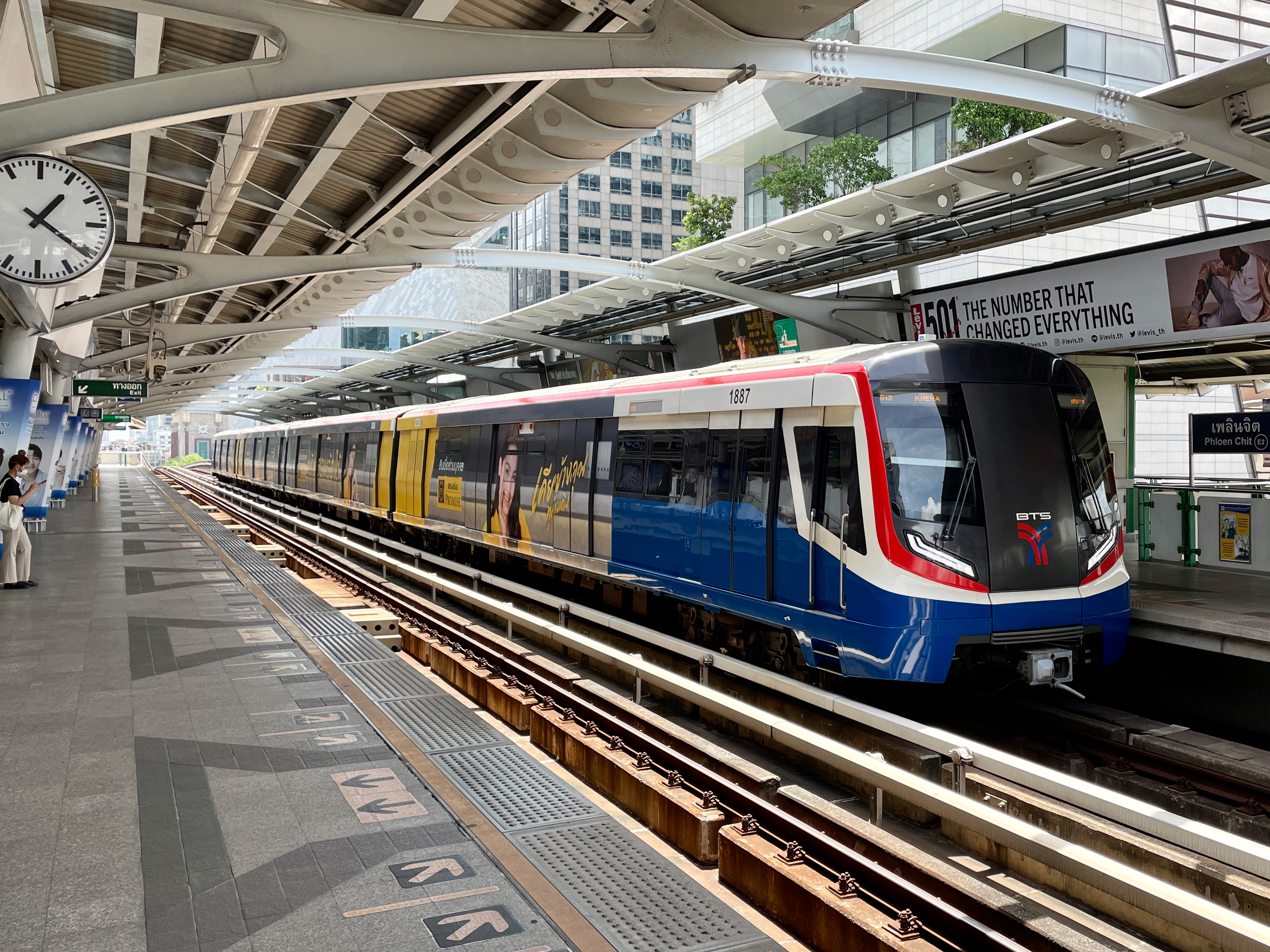
- Phloen Chit station

General information
- Location: Pathum Wan; Bangkok; Thailand
- Coordinates: 13°44′35.09″N 100°32′56.47″E
- System: BTS
- Owner: Bangkok Metropolitan Administration (BMA); BTS Rail Mass Transit Growth Infrastructure Fund (BTSGIF)
- Operator: Bangkok Mass Transit System; Public Company Limited (BTSC)
- Line: Sukhumvit Line

Other information
- Station code: E2

History
- Opened: 5 December 1999

Passengers
- 2021: 2,362,816

Services
Preceding station	BTS Skytrain	Following station
Chit Lom towards Khu Khot	Sukhumvit Line	Nana towards Kheha
Location

Phloen Chit Station Traditional sign

Phloen Chit station (Thai: สถานีเพลินจิต, pronounced [sā.tʰǎː.nīː pʰlɤ̄ːn t͡ɕìt]) is a BTS skytrain station, on the Sukhumvit Line in Pathum Wan District, Bangkok, Thailand. The station is located on Phloen Chit Road at Phloen Chit intersection, where Phloen Chit intersects with Witthayu Road next to the beginning of Sukhumvit Road. It is surrounded by hotels, skyscrapers, office towers and many embassies especially the British and American embassies on Wireless Road. It is connected by skywalk to Central Embassy.

== See also ==
- Bangkok Skytrain
