= Central Embassy =

- Central Embassy in 2026
- Location: Pathum Wan, Bangkok, Thailand
- Coordinates: 13°44′37.76″N 100°32′47.09″E
- Opened: 9 May 2014 (Shopping Center); 7 June 2014 (Cinema); 12 May 2017 (Hotel)
- Owner: Central Group
- Num. of stores: The 40 stories are divided into 13 shopping centers, including the basement. 32-storey Park Hyatt Hotel
- Public transit: Chit Lom BTS Station Phloen Chit BTS Station
- Website: centralembassy.com

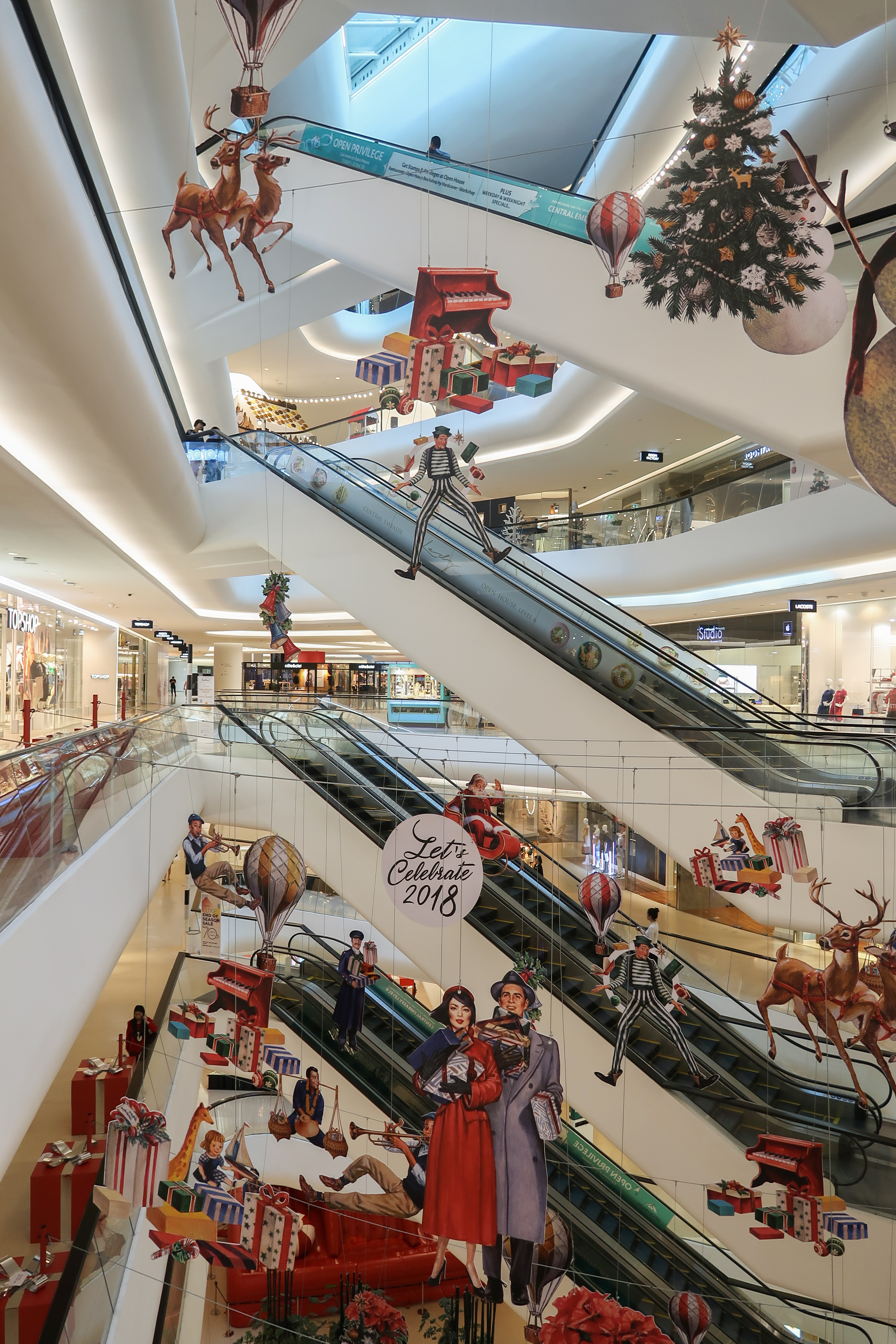
Atrium

Central Embassy is a shopping mall in Bangkok. A project of the Thai conglomerate Central Group, it was constructed on the site of the former British Embassy gardens on Phloen Chit Road.

== History ==
Central Embassy was designed for mixed-use commercial purposes incorporating department stores, hotels and offices. It encompasses a prime commercial center managed by the Department of Business Administration Group, Central Group Company Limited, and Central Department of Trade Company Limited.

Central Embassy forms a part of the Central Group's Ploenchit City project. Additionally, the development catalyzed the broader Ploenchit City Project in Central Bangkok, spearheaded by Univenture Public Company Limited. Univenture is also the proprietor of the Park Venture Building, home to the Okura Prestige Hotel Bangkok.

Central Embassy was initially scheduled to open at the end of 2013. However, construction delays led to a postponement, with a new opening date set for February 2014. This timeline was further disrupted when the PDRC group established a presence in a nearby area of Bangkok's inner city, causing ongoing construction challenges. As a result, Central Embassy's launch faced additional delays and was rescheduled for March 2014. The opening was deferred four more times before the Central Group finally announced the revised opening date for Central Embassy.

On May 18, 2017, with the theme "This Brings Me Here," the Central Group formally opened the shopping complexes and the Park Hyatt Bangkok Hotel.

== Location ==
Central Embassy is located at the junction between the northwest corner of the Ploenchit intersection and Witthayu Road (Wireless). Its address is 1031 Ploenchit Road, Pathumwan District, Bangkok 10330, Thailand.

== Transportation ==
• Sukhumvit Line: Chit Lom BTS Station (connects to Central Chidlom on the 2nd floor) and Phloen Chit BTS Station (directly connects to the Embassy Park Building on the 1st floor.)

• Bus of the Bangkok Mass Transit Organization: Lines 2, 25, 40, 48, 501, 508, 511, 513 through the Ploenchit Road.

== Layout ==
Designed by Amanda Levete Architects, the six-storey building is shaped like an infinity symbol when viewed from the top. The mall consists of outlets from high-end local and international brands in the fields of fashion, beauty, design, cuisine, and technology. It has also hosted exhibits, collections, and performances by well-known musicians, fashion designers, curators, and visual artists.

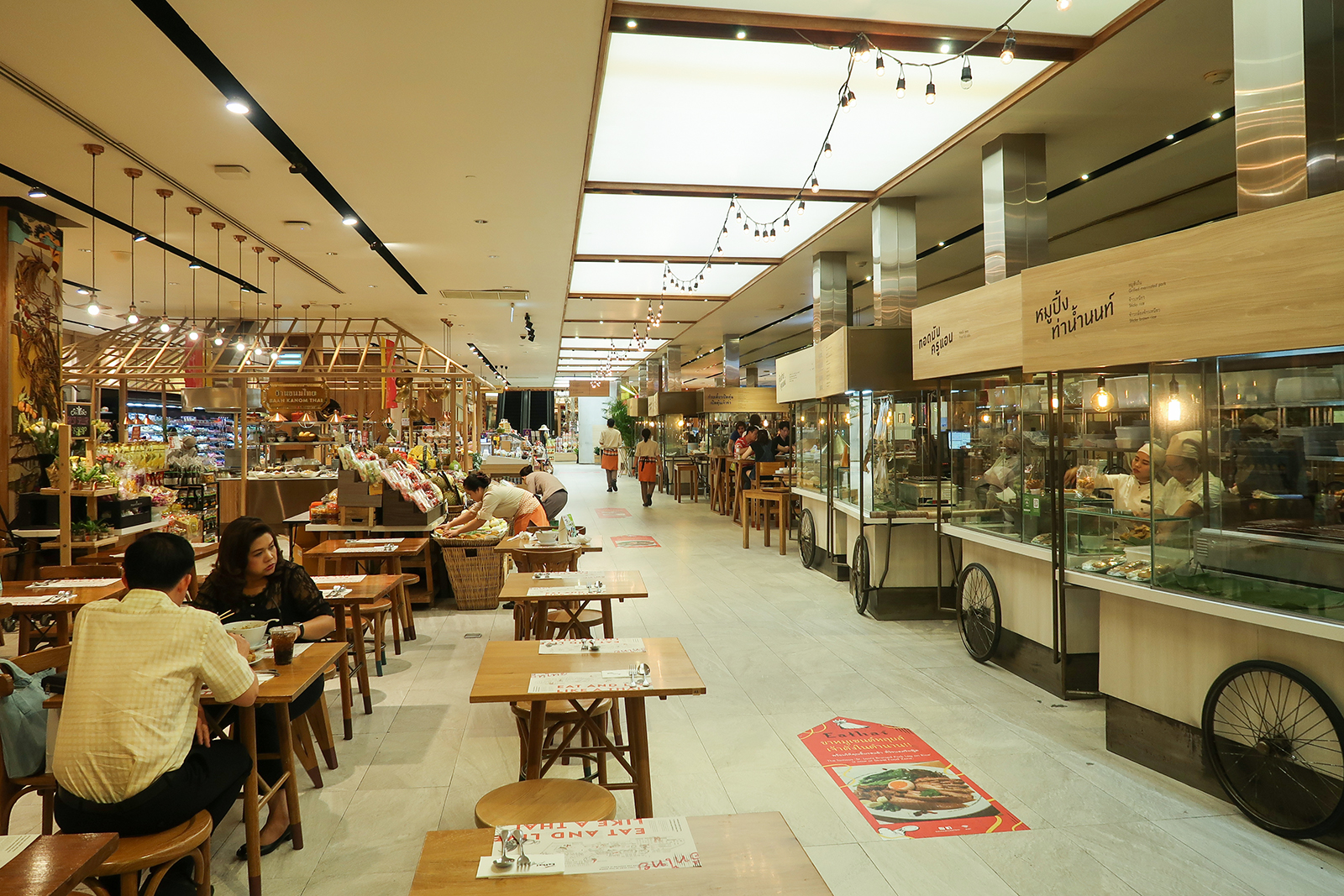
Eathai food court in basement

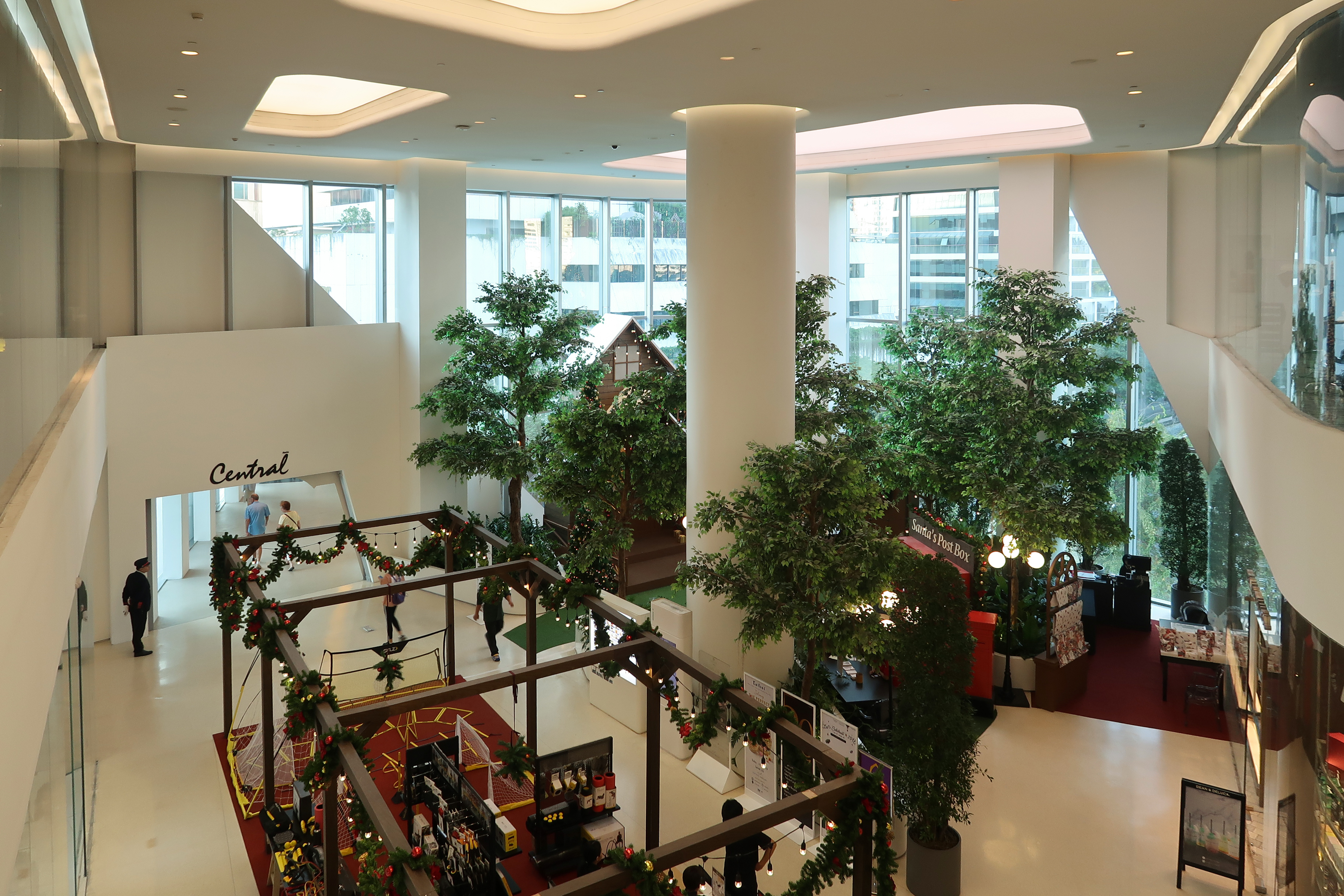
Level 2

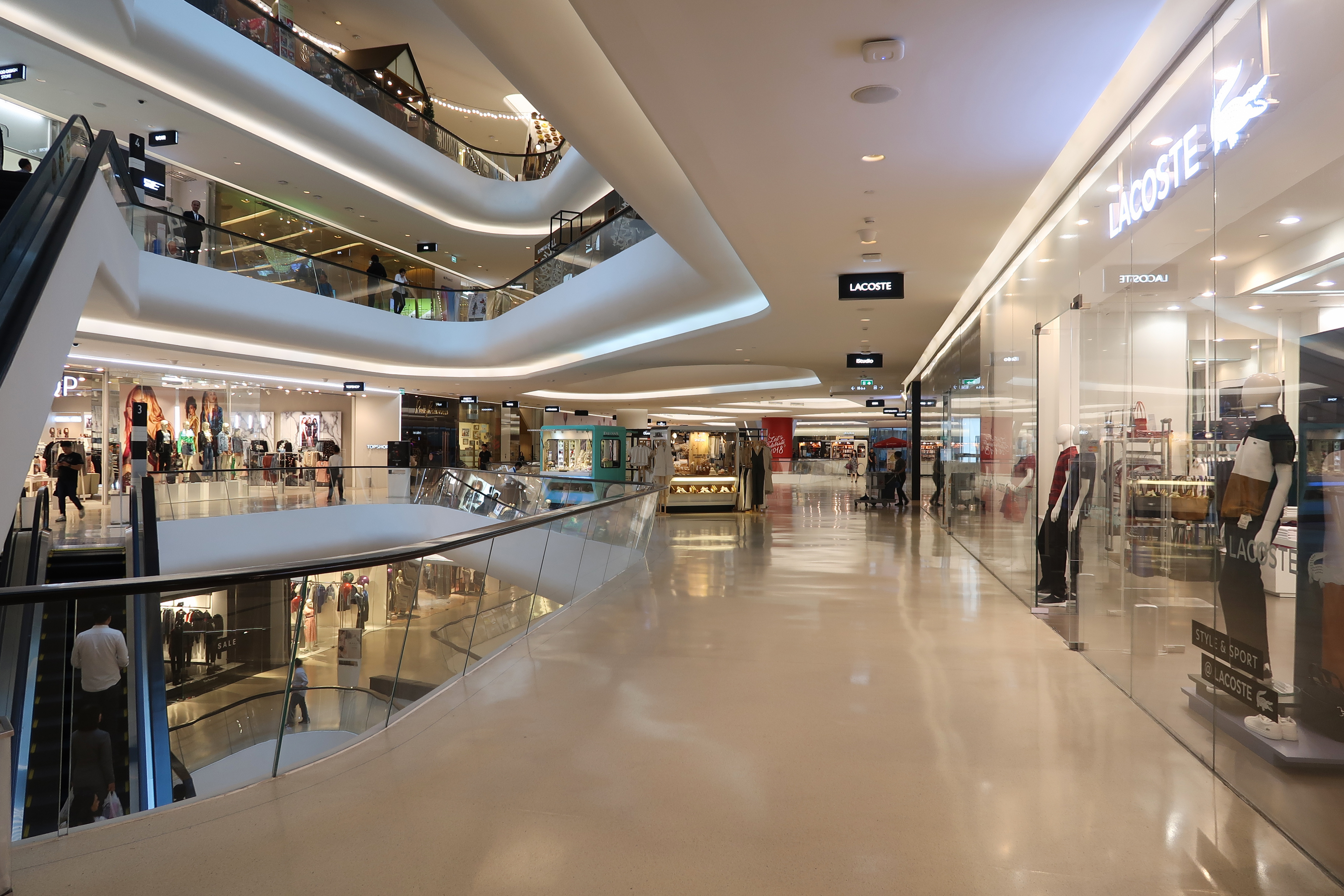
Level 3

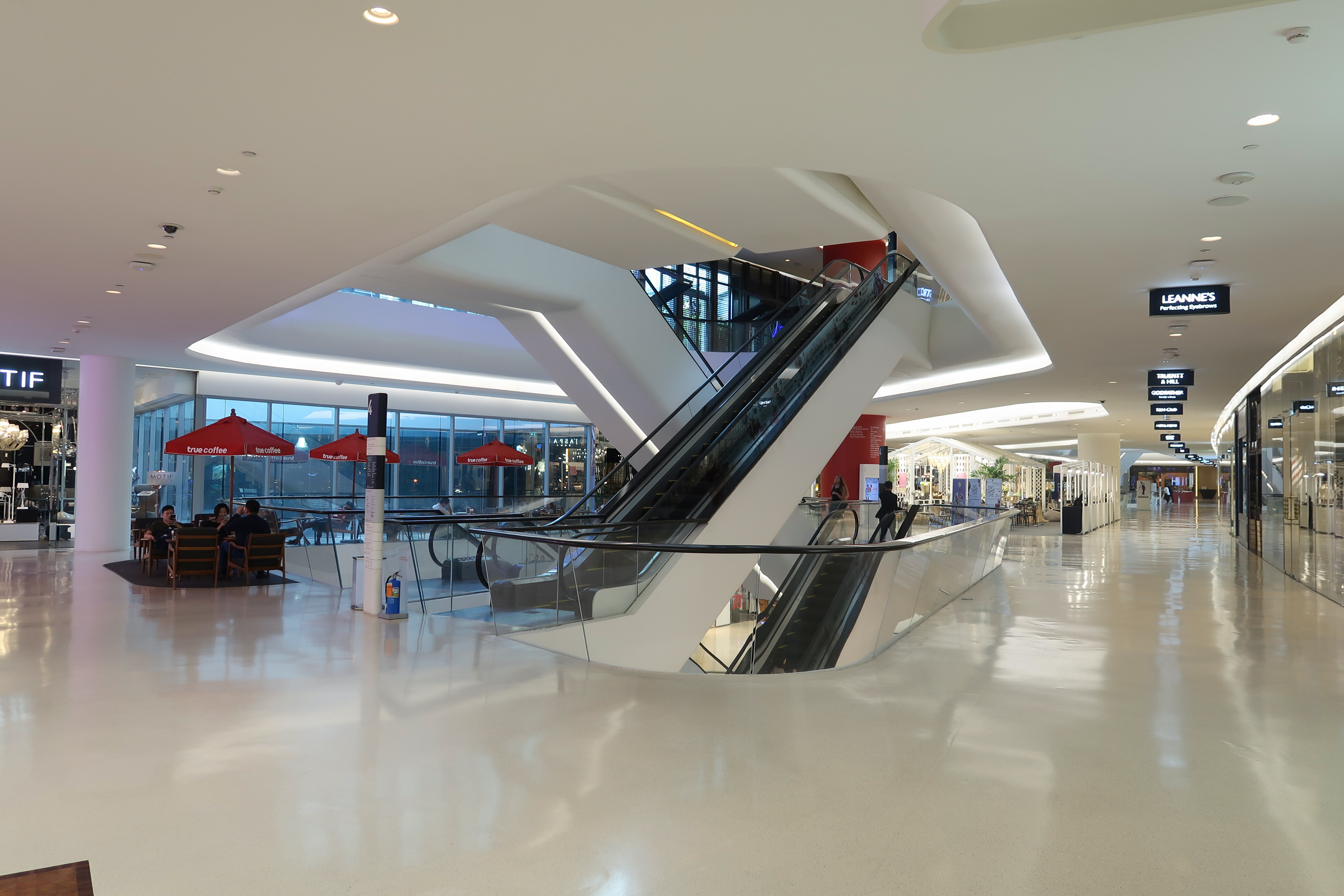
Level 4

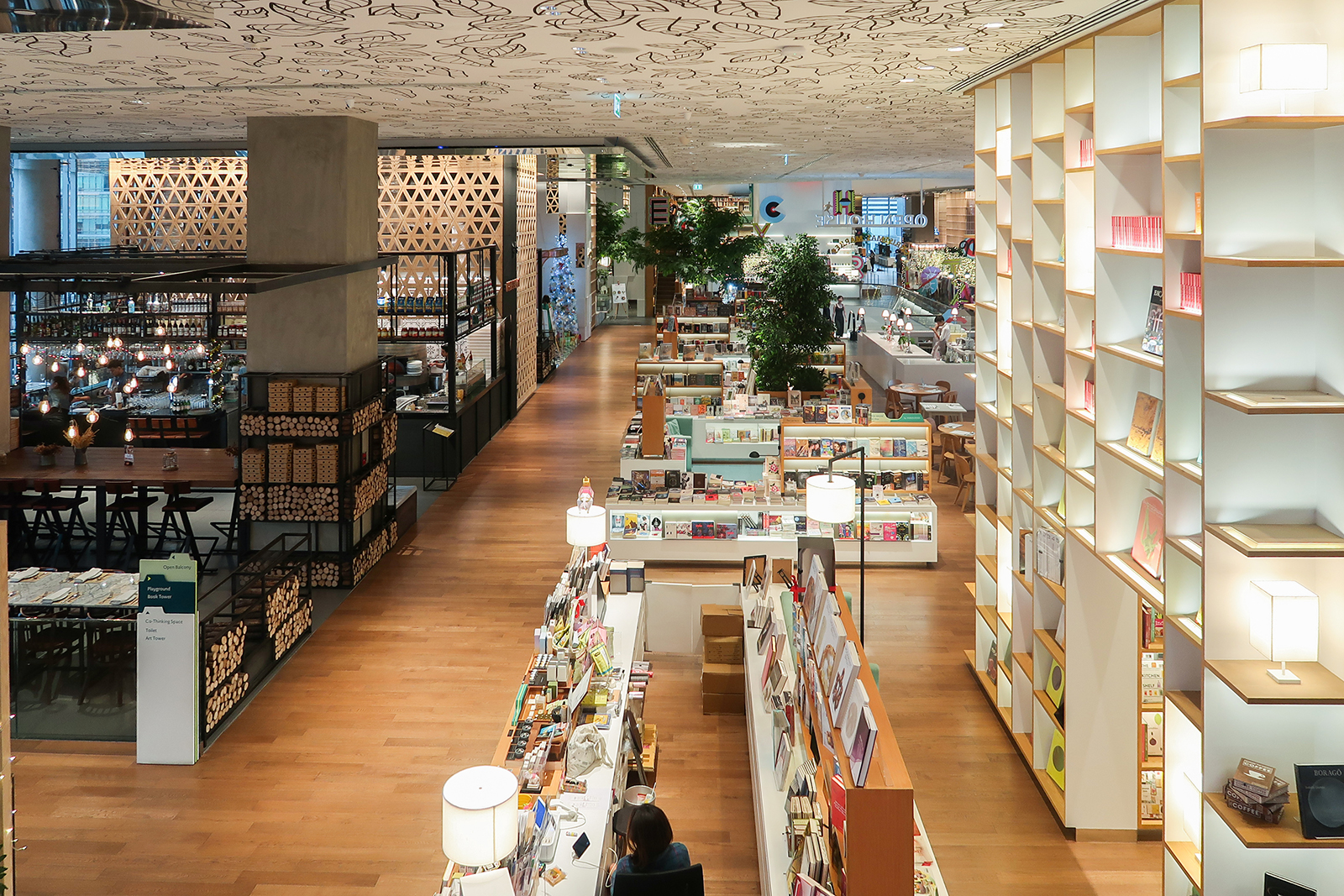
Open House in Level 6
