= Nai Lert Park Heritage Home =

Park, heritage home, and museum in Bangkok, Thailand

Coordinates: 13°44′46″N 100°32′50″E

- บ้านปาร์คนายเลิศ
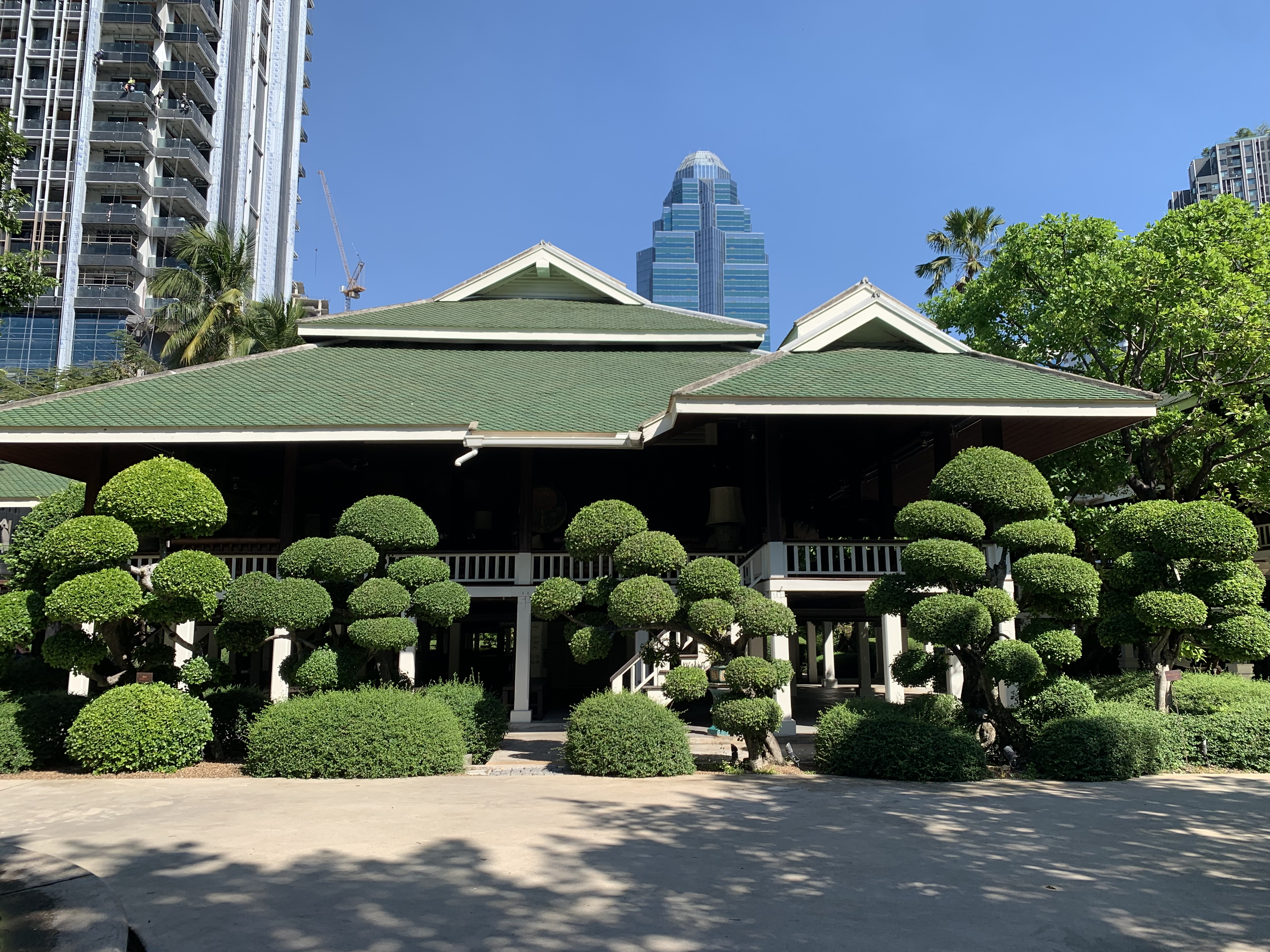
- Established: 1915 (House), 19 December 2015 (Museum)
- Location: Pathum Wan, Bangkok, Thailand
- Type: Historic house museum
- Collection size: 30,000
- Architect: Nai Lert

Nai Lert Park Heritage Home (Thai: บ้านปาร์คนายเลิศ) is a 14 rai (2.2 ha) park, heritage home, and museum in Bangkok, Thailand. Located in Pathum Wan district, the home was designed and built in 1915 by developer Nai Lert, and the park is considered to be the oldest in Bangkok. The home was constructed in a bungalow style with teak left over from the construction of American and Danish ocean liners, along with ships for the Royal Siamese Navy. The museum was reopened to the public in 2016, after years of renovation.

In 2020, Aman Resorts announced the development of Aman Nai Lert Bangkok, overlooking the park. The hotel was designed by Jean-Michel Gathy. The hotel opened on 2 April 2025.

== History ==
Nai Lert (Lert Sreshthaputra) bought much land in Bangkok and later expanded the area by purchasing land along Sukhumvit Road in the early reign of King Rama VI. At that time, it was a rice field called "Thung Bang Kapi" (ทุ่งบางกะปิ), with a price of only 8 satang per square wa, with the intention of developing an area of approximately 60 rai around Phloen Chit as a vacation home. Therefore, he designed a large teak house to live in during 1915 and ordered people to dig the Somkid Canal in front of the house to connect it to the Khlong Saen Saep. Ready to hire an Italian architect to design a garden for relaxation. Including open to the public on Sundays. and let the scouts come to stay overnight In the first phase, half of the land was not yet sold to the Embassy of the United Kingdom, which moved out of Bang Rak. A large pond and swings were dug for people to jump into the water and play.

In the first phase, there were only one-story teak houses in a tetrahedral style. Raise the floor under the open basement. Hip roof with raised gables, 3 layers, covered with glazed terra cotta tiles. The floor is made up of pieces of teak that are arranged together. The wood used is leftover wood from the construction of the Rama VI Bridge (Mr. Lert used to open an ocean-going shipyard business for a while).

Later, Mr. Lert's family moved to live at Baan Park permanently. Therefore, another wooden house was added to connect them. Mr. Lert designed it himself. Part of the park used to be a white bus depot. Both are used to park and maintain buses and boat buses, and there are also employees' residences lined up. and a gas station for filling up buses Until during World War II, when Mr. Lert was 70 years old, Nai Lert's Park House, which was next to the British Embassy, Japan's belligerent Japanese soldiers had invaded the area of his house for more than 4 years and had also been attacked by the Allies with bombs that missed their targets and fell in the park many times, a total of 22 bombs. One bomb fell in front of the house and left a deep hole. Nai Lert Park's house therefore renovated that hole into a lotus pond. Baan Park therefore has a 10 meter deep bunker for use in emergencies. It is now a small pond. Bombs still fall on the west side of the house. The entire house was damaged until it flipped on its side.

After the war, Mr. Lert built a new wooden house to replace the old one. As can be seen from the restored house, it is lighter in color. Because they used redwood and teak instead of teak and spent 100,000 baht on repairs. After Mr. Lert and his wife, Khunying Sin Phakdinorasetha passed away. Lady Lursakdi Sampatisiri also lived at Nai Lert Park's house until the end of her life.

In 1983, some land was set aside to build a hotel. Some land of Ban Nai Lert Park was sold.

After Thanpuying Lesak Sombatsiri passed away in 2010, her heirs thought that it should be opened as a small museum for the public to view in the form of a Heritage Home. However, due to the condition of the house building deteriorating, in 2012, the Nai Lert Group renovated the Nai Lert Park House into a private museum. Opened for service on 19 December 2015. After that, the hotel building was sold to BDMS Wellness Clinic Company Limited, a Bangkok Hospital chain, during 2016, which is currently Mövenpick BDMS Wellness Resort Bangkok.

== Exhibits ==
This ancient building at Ban Nai Lert Park is divided into two parts. One building was built for residential use. and another building built specifically to be a bedroom. In the present era There was a restoration to adjust the height of both houses by about one and a half meters. To make it more useful for usability And after the renovation of the house was completed, it was opened as a museum, including This place is also used for important ceremonies such as engagement ceremonies. or a Thai wedding ceremony.

Inside the Nai Lert Park House is divided into 2 exhibits: a women's house that will display the story of the history of the Nai Lert Park House. Biography of family members utensils, collectibles, and clothing. Another part is Than Chao Khun's house. On display are porcelain, Buddha rooms, and kitchenware. All exhibits will be placed in the same location as before.
