= W. A. R. Wood =

British diplomat (1878–1970)

William Alfred Rae Wood CMG CIE (23 January 1878 – 21 January 1970) was a British diplomat who lived most of his life in Thailand. He began working as an interpreter at the British Legation in Bangkok in 1896, and became the British Consul-General in Chiang Mai in 1921. He retired from office in 1931, and later took up teaching English in Chiang Mai, where he permanently settled down. He was a well known figure in the expatriate British community, and wrote several books, including Consul in Paradise (1965), a memoir covering his life in Thailand, and A History of Siam (1926), which was regarded as a standard work of the time.

== Works ==
- A history of Siam. T. Fisher Unwin. 1926.
- Consul in paradise: sixty-nine years in Siam. London: Souvenir Press. 1965.
