= Mövenpick BDMS Wellness Resort Bangkok =

Wellness hotel in Thailand

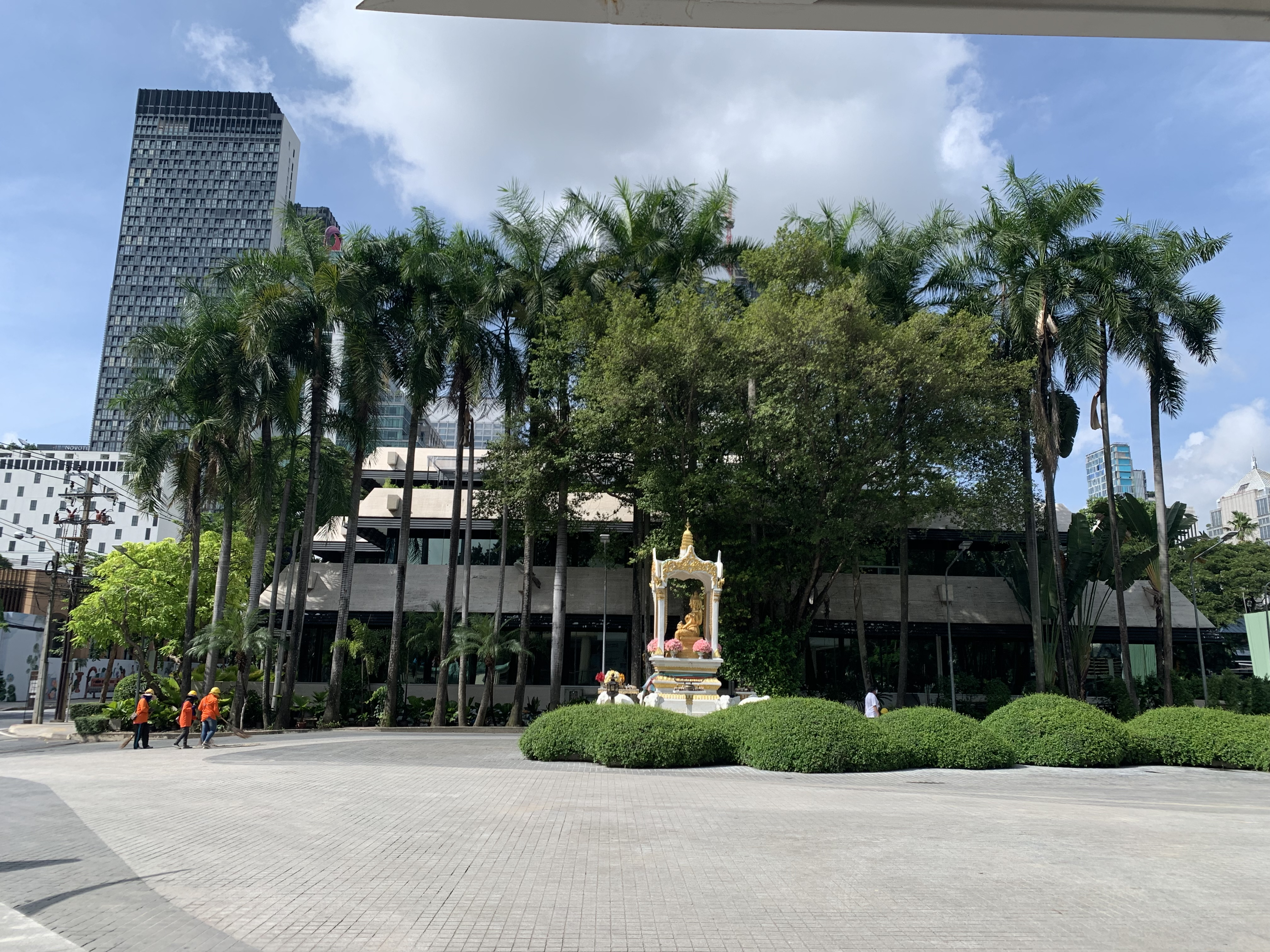
- Mövenpick BDMS Wellness Resort Bangkok in 2022

- Location within Bangkok

General information
- Location: 2/14 Wireless Road, Pathum Wan, Bangkok, Thailand
- Coordinates: 13°44′51″N 100°32′50″E
- Completed: 1984
- Owner: Bangkok Dusit Medical Services

The Mövenpick BDMS Wellness Resort Bangkok is a luxury wellness hotel on Witthayu Road, Bangkok, Thailand.

BDMS is an abbreviation of Bangkok Dusit Medical Services. (Note: Not be confused with BDSM.)

== History ==
The hotel was built by Thai developer Lursakdi Sampatisiri in 1984 as the Hilton International Bangkok at Nai Lert Park, managed by Hilton International. On June 13, 2003 the Sampatisiri family signed Raffles International Hotels to manage the hotel in their Swissôtel division, and on January 1, 2004 it was renamed first Nai Lert Park Bangkok, a Raffles International Hotel and then later Swissôtel Nai Lert Park Bangkok. It contained 338 rooms. Lonely Planet said of the hotel, "a mishmash of bygone styles, the Nai Lert is a bit disappointing in the cramped rooms, but glorious underneath a shady tree in its private garden-park." The hotel was awarded Thailand’s Leading Business Hotel by the World Travel Awards Asia in 2008. The hotel restaurant Ma Maison was named Best Restaurant by Thailand Tatler’s Best Restaurants. On June 4, 2009, American actor David Carradine was found dead of asphyxiation in the wardrobe of his room in the hotel.

The hotel was sold to Bangkok Dusit Medical Services in 2016 and closed on December 31, 2016 for conversion to a branch of Bangkok Hospital. However it was announced in August 2018 that BDMS would partner with Mövenpick Hotels & Resorts and they reopened the property as a "holistic services medical centre" resort hotel in 2019, the Mövenpick BDMS Wellness Resort Bangkok .

== Gallery ==
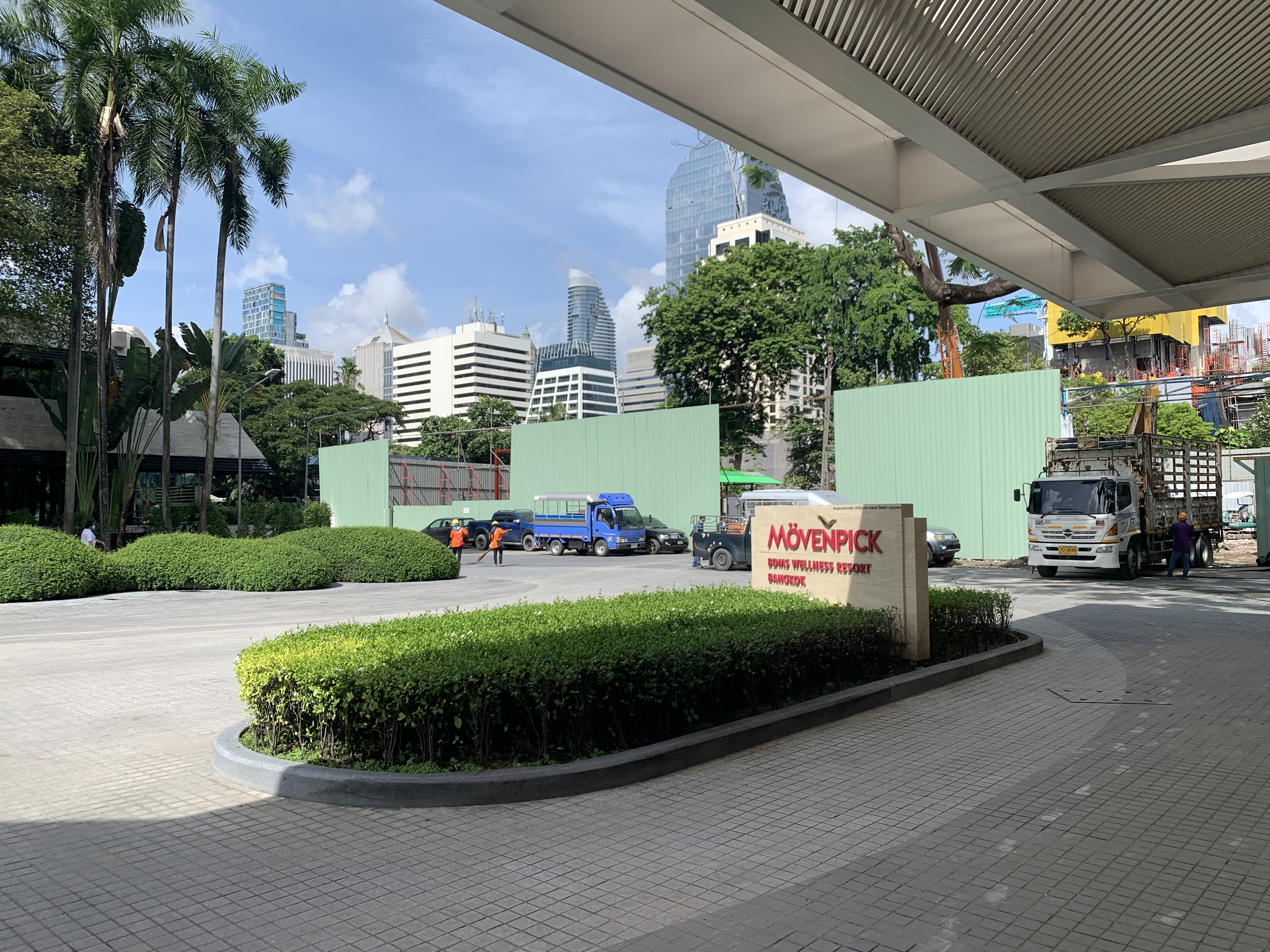
Sign at the entrance, as of 2022, the hotel is marketed under the brand Mövenpick

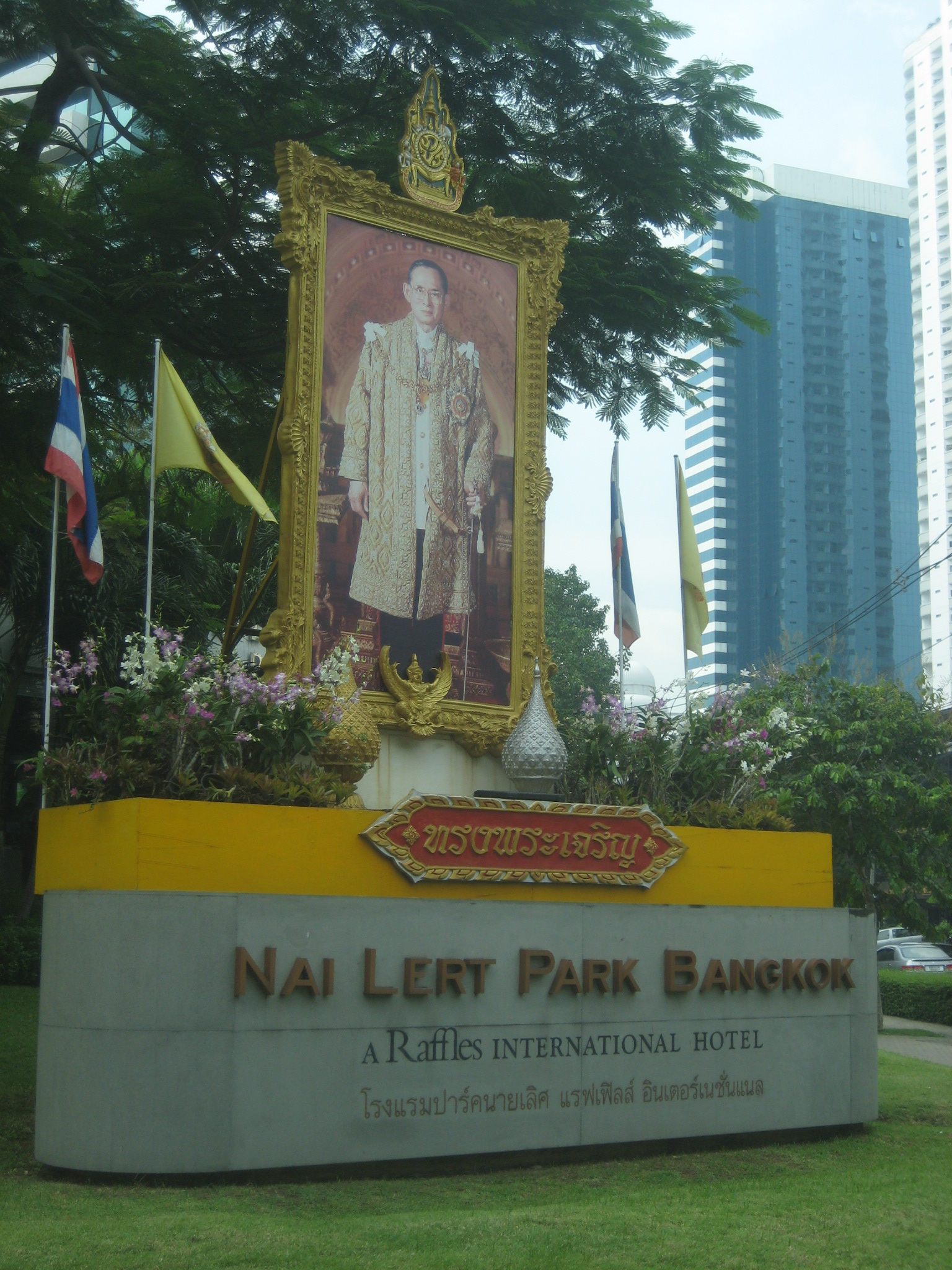
Sign at the entrance, in 2007, when the hotel was a Raffles International Hotel

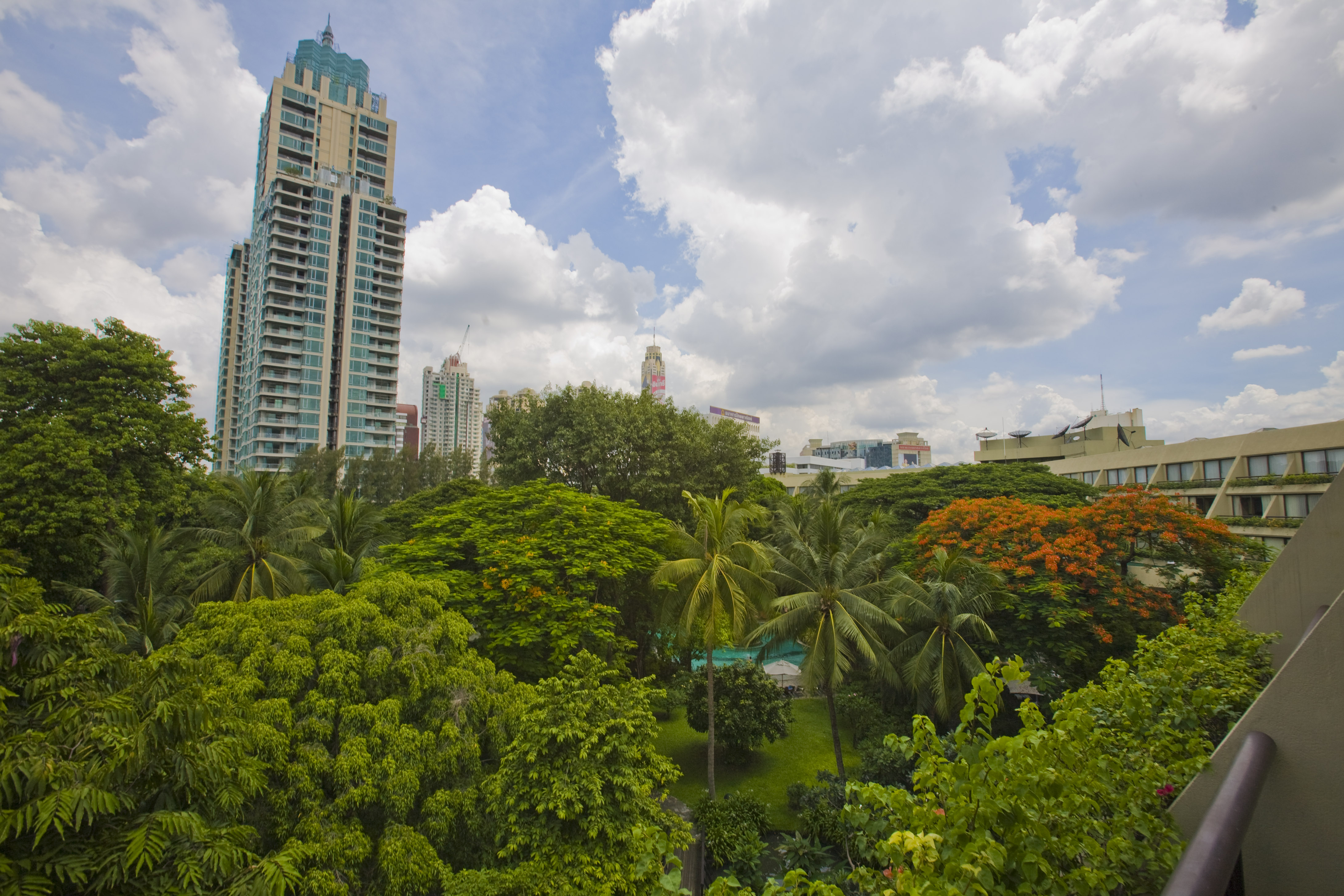
The hotel's extensive gardens, 2007

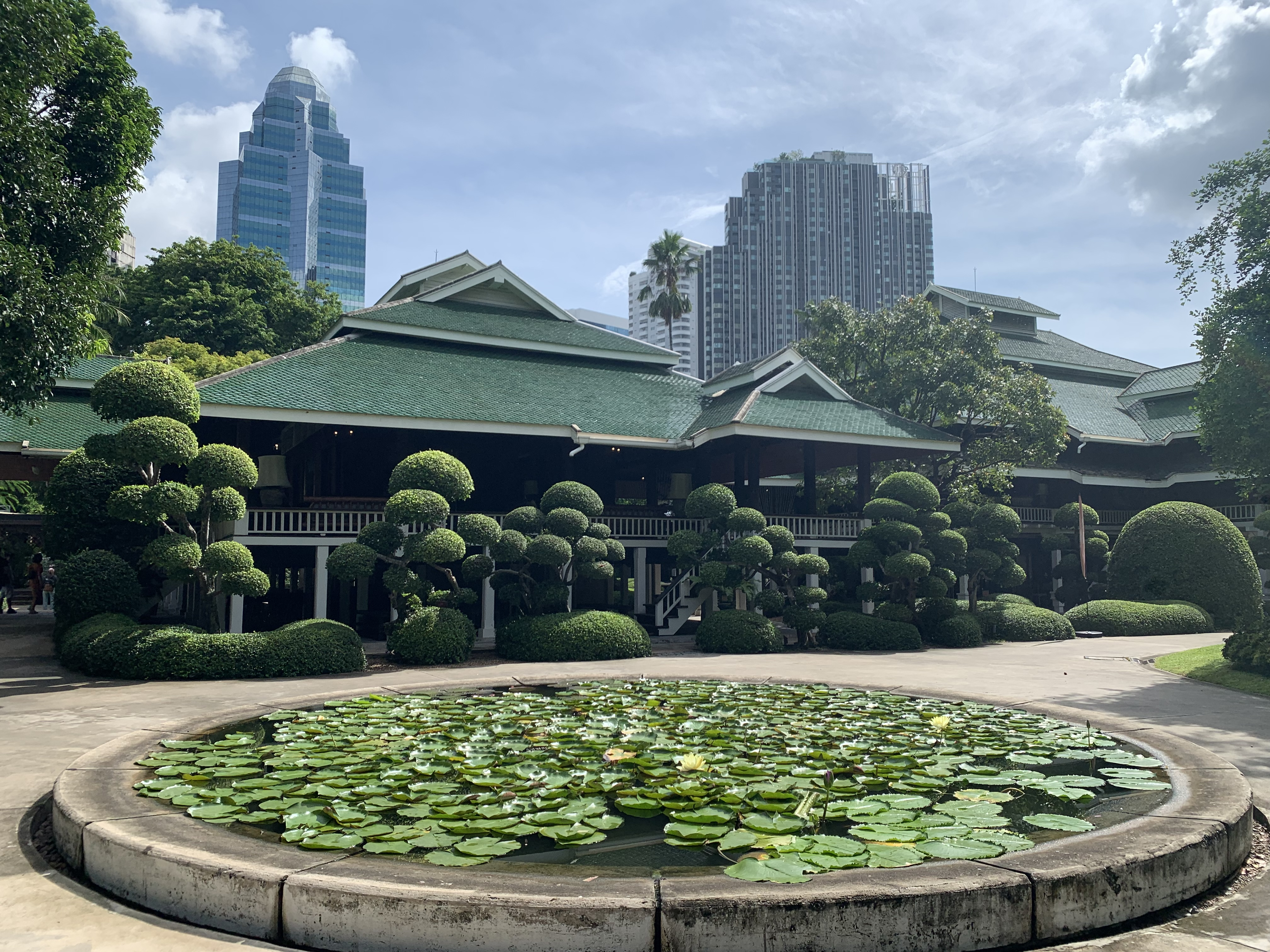
Nai Lert Park Heritage Home, now a museum, is located within the complex.
