= Phloen Chit Road =

Street in Bangkok, Thailand

Coordinates: 13°44′36″N 100°32′51″E

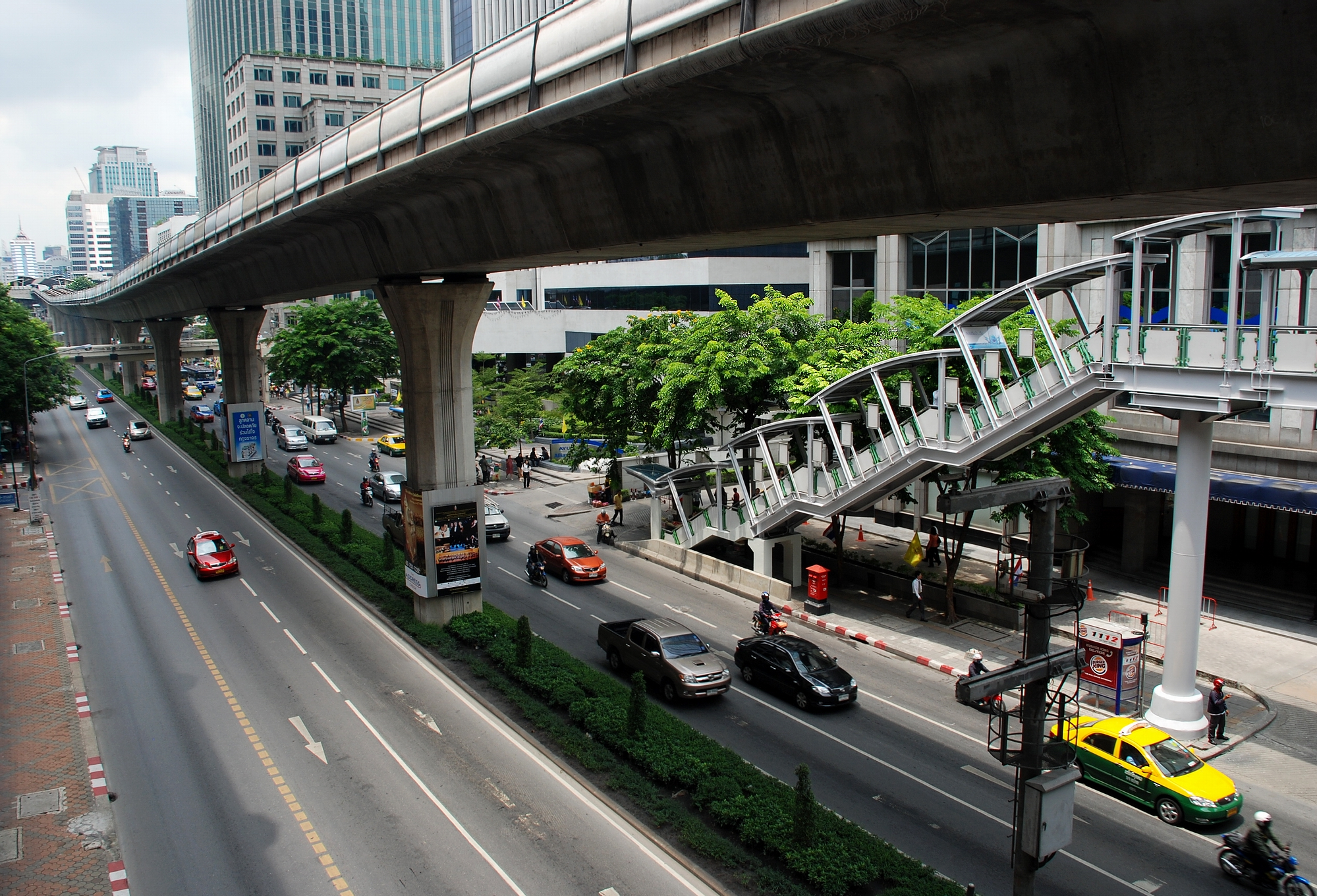
Phloen Chit Road, looking west from Chit Lom BTS Station

Phloen Chit Road (Thai: ถนนเพลินจิต, also spelled Ploenchit, pronounced [pʰlɤ̄ːn.tɕìt]) is a major road in central Bangkok. Located entirely within Lumphini Subdistrict of Pathum Wan District, it runs a short distance of 1.2 kilometres (0.75 mi) between Ratchaprasong Intersection and the Maenam railway branch line, forming a continuation of the westward Rama I Road and then itself continuing on to the east as Sukhumvit Road. It serves the neighbourhoods of Ratchaprasong, Chit Lom Intersection (where it intersects Chit Lom and Lang Suan Roads) and Phloen Chit Intersection (where it intersects Witthayu Road), which are home to major shopping malls, hotels and office towers. The areas are served by the Chit Lom and Phloen Chit Stations of the BTS skytrain, whose Sukhumvit Line runs above Phloen Chit Road.

== History ==
Phloen Chit Road was built in 1920, in the reign of King Vajiravudh (Rama VI). Much of the area was then developed by the enterprising Chinese businessman Nai Lert, who bought large amounts of land, building for himself an estate (now Nai Lert Park) and subdivided the rest into plots to sell. The British Embassy, established on the corner of Phloen Chit Intersection in 1922, used to occupy one of the largest compounds in the area.

Its name, "Phloen Chit", means "enjoy the mind" and was proposed by Prince Narathip Praphanphong. At that time, the area was considered a suburb, far from downtown, and traveling there was inconvenient. Ironically, people sometimes referred to it as "don't worry" because of the effort required to reach it.
