= Lursakdi Sampatisiri =

Thai businesswoman

Than Phu Ying Lursakdi Sampatisiri
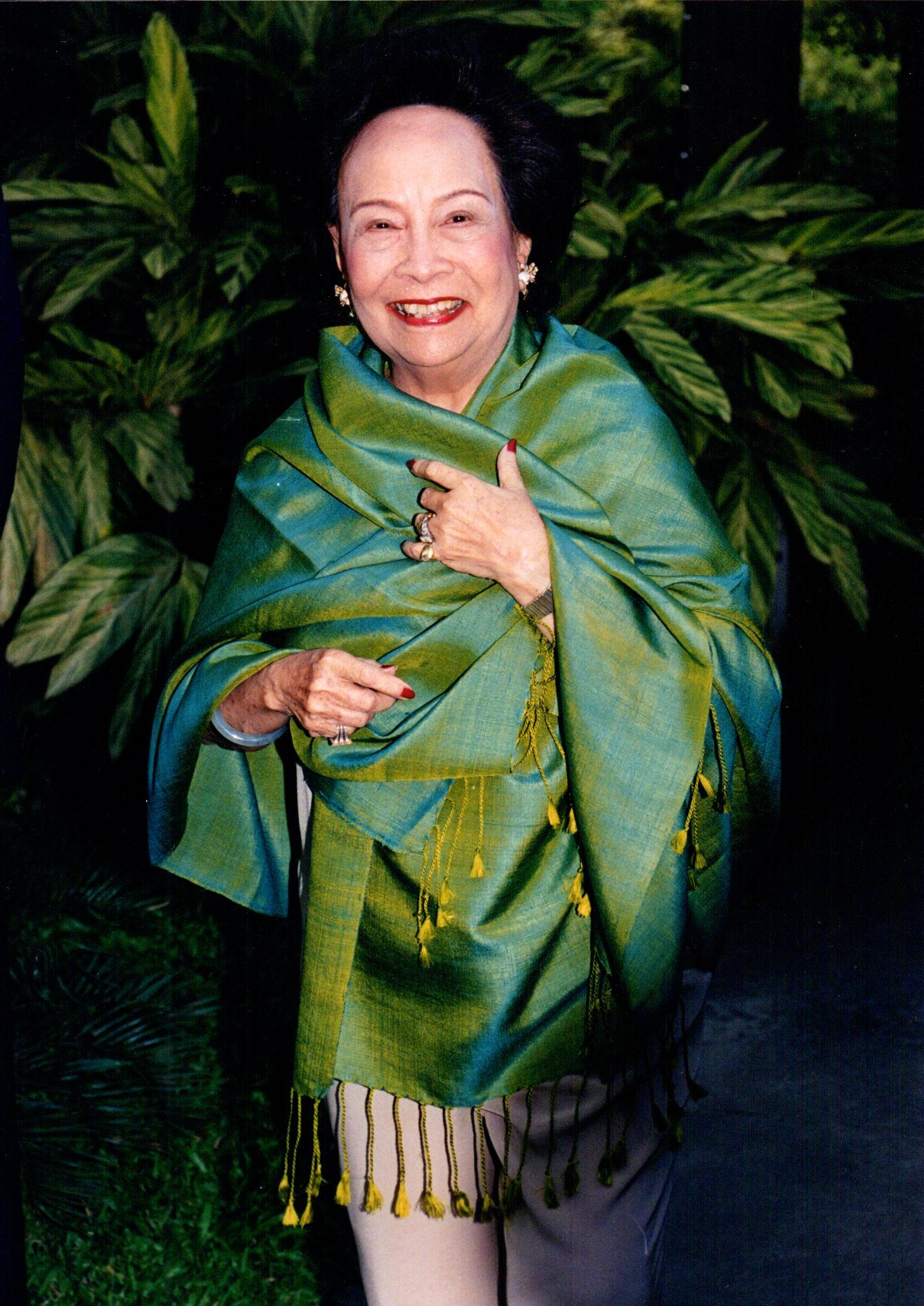
- Thanpuying Lursakdi Sampatisiri in 1995

Minister of Transport
- In office 22 October 1976 – 20 October 1977
- Prime Minister: Tanin Kraivixien
- Preceded by: Thawit Klinprathum
- Succeeded by: Surakit Mayalai

Personal details
- Born: Lursakdi Sreshthaputa; 20 February 1919 Bangkok, Thailand
- Died: 9 November 2010 (aged 91) Bangkok, Thailand
- Spouse: Binich Sampatisiri
- Children: Bilhaiban Sampatisiri; Sanhapit Bodiratnangkura
- Occupation: Hotel owner, head of Nad Lert Group

Thanpuying Lursakdi Sampatisiri (20 February 1919 – 9 November 2010; Thai: เลอศักดิ์ สมบัติศิริ; RTGS: Loesak Sombatsiri; Thai pronunciation: [lɤːsàk sǒmbàtsìrì]) was the daughter of Nai Lert Sreshthaputa and the only heir of the business and real estate empire, founded in 1894, known as Nai Lert Group. As one of Thailand's most prominent businesswomen, Sampatisiri created one of the first international hotels in Bangkok, The Hilton International Bangkok at Lert Park. Since 2003 the hotel was known as Swissôtel Nai Lert Park Hotel, Bangkok, and was the flagship of the real estate portfolio of the group. After being sold in 2016 it is since 2018 a Mövenpick Hotels & Resorts as they reopened the property as a "holistic services medical centre" resort hotel.

== Early years ==
When Sampatisiri was a young woman (1930s), her father sent her to Japan, because he predicted that economic power would be centered there in her generation. She could only attend a college as Japanese universities did not accept women at that time. When she returned to Thailand, her father send her to work for the Office of Civil Servants Commission to find out how the Government worked. After three years of Government service, she returned to the family business, living, as she describes herself, a "life of privilege, rather than family duty, within Thailand's small economic elite" even though she had many responsibilities as sole heir.

Sampatisiri's father died suddenly, when she was 27 years old, and she found herself at the helm of his business empire which included the White Bus Company which dominated the Bangkok's transport routes (including its canals) and the ice factories which supplied the majority of the city's population. When Sampatisiri took over she became the first and only female in the company, but she convinced the managers to stay and keep the company going.

In 1930, she married Khun Binich Sampatisiri, who himself came from a prestigious background of public service. His father, Srisena Sampatisiri, served as ambassador to Japan and other countries in the 1930s and 1940s and was Thailand's Foreign Minister from 1944 to 1945, after which he served as Minister of Interior in the 14th Thai Cabinet. Khun Binich, himself, served as the Chief of the Traditional Arts Division of the Department of Fine Arts at the Ministry of Education for The Royal Thai Government and was a frequent host to overseas visitors and celebrities, being known for his sense of hospitality and entertainment (US comic Joey Adams mentions his encounter with Khun Binich in his book On The Road for Uncle Sam).

== First woman in government ==
Seeing the coming of refrigeration, Lursakdi shifted her focus to transport. Unfortunately and suddenly, in 1975, the carefully planned expansion of the transport business was swept away overnight by the chaos of Thai politics. After the government nationalized the Bangkok bus companies, which included the family run White Bus Company, Lursakdi, then Khunying Lursakdi, was invited by Thanin Kraivichien, appointed Prime Minister by Royal Decree of King Rama IX on 8 October 1976, to join his cabinet as Minister of Transport thus making her the first female Minister in a Thai Government.

== Catering to the legacy ==
Lursakdi was, most recently, the chairperson of the business group that bears her father's name and also of the Lerd-Sinn Foundation which was created by her mother, Khunying Sinn, after the death of her father. The Lerd-Sinn Foundation, among other charitable activities, donated the proceeds used to build the Lerdsin hospital. She represented the first of three generations of women who shaped the Nai Lert Park hotel in Bangkok and provided the strategic direction of the Nai Lert Group. Her daughters, Bilhaiban Sampatisiri and Sanhapit Bodiratnangkura, as well as her granddaughter, Naphaporn Bodiratnangkura, were also engaged in the family business.
