= Embassy of the United Kingdom, Bangkok =

Chief diplomatic mission of the UK in Thailand

Coordinates: 13°44′42″N 100°32′48″E

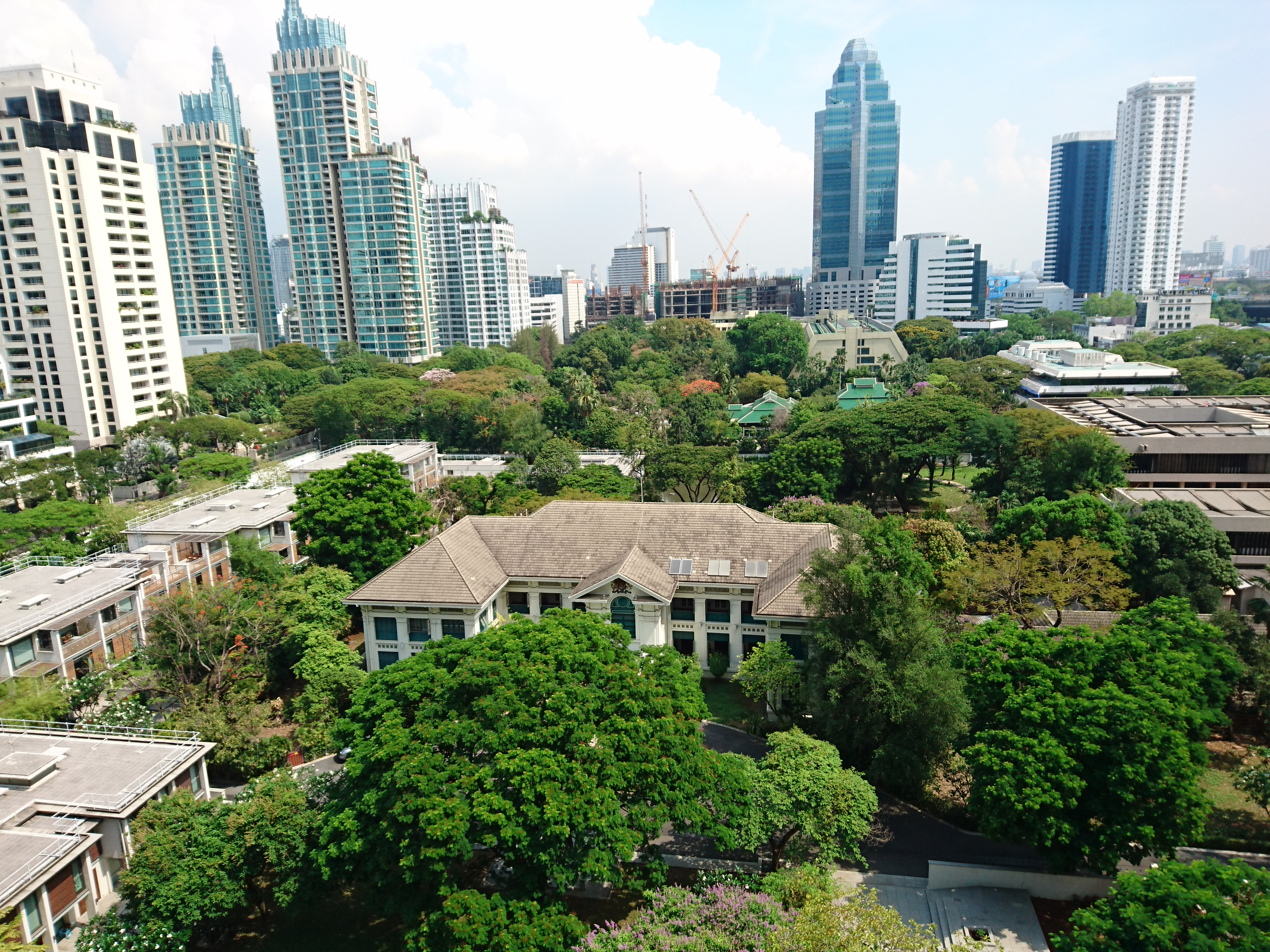
The embassy at its former site in 2017

The Embassy of the United Kingdom in Bangkok is the chief diplomatic mission of the United Kingdom in Thailand. Established as an embassy in 1947, its history dates to 1856 when a British consul was first posted in Bangkok following the signing of the Bowring Treaty. First established on Charoen Krung Road by the Chao Phraya River, the mission relocated to a new site on the corner of Phloen Chit and Witthayu Roads in 1922. Originally a rural location on the outskirts of the city, the area soon developed into one of the city centre's prime locations. The compound remained a leafy oasis amidst its densely developed surroundings throughout the 20th century, but was sold to Central Group at record-setting prices, first partially in 2007, then completely in 2017. The embassy is now based in an office building on Sathon Road, while its original buildings, including the ambassador's residence, have been demolished to make way for redevelopment.

== History ==
=== Establishment ===
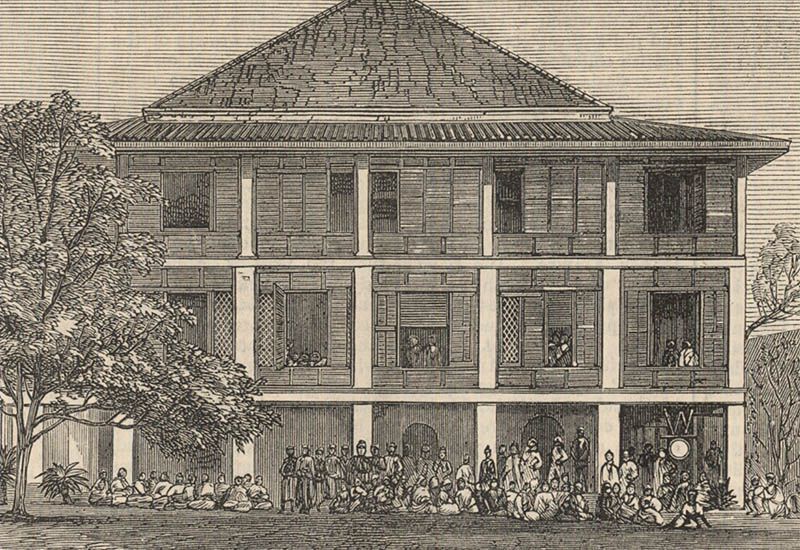
The British Consulate General in 1875

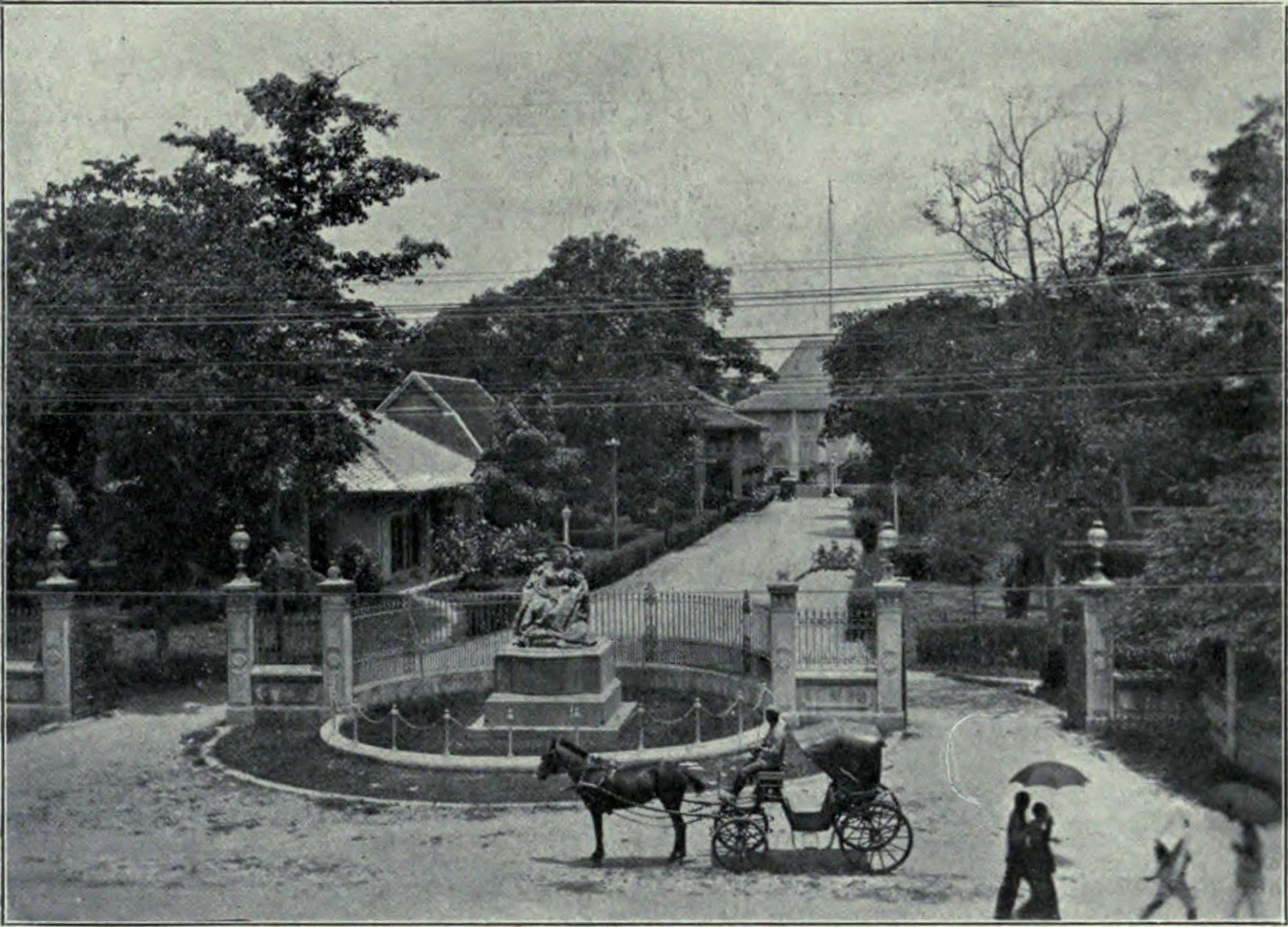
The British Legation, c. 1908

In 1856, following the coming into force of the Bowring Treaty, Charles Batten Hillier became the first British Consul in Bangkok. The mission originally rented premises in the area of Bang Kho Laem District, but was soon gifted a piece land on the bank of the Chao Phraya, next to the Portuguese Consulate, by King Mongkut. This was a gesture of generosity, as well as restitution for an incident where Siamese officials punished a British subject of a crime, violating the extraterritoriality provided by the new treaty. Construction of the new building was finished in 1876. By then, the newly built Charoen Krung Road also ran past the property, opposite the river.

The consulate was raised to the status of a legation in 1895, and by the 1900s came to house several buildings, including the minister's residence, two jails and two courthouses. A flagpole, the tallest in Bangkok at the time, was raised in 1892 to replace an earlier one blown down in a storm. Made of steel and ordered from Hong Kong, its cost of £500 earned the vice-consul responsible a reprimand from the Foreign Office and Ministry of Works for unnecessary extravagance. A statue of Queen Victoria was raised on the site in 1903. The statue was officially unveiled by Crown Prince Vajiravudh during a ceremony held on 23 March 1905.

=== Move to Phloen Chit ===
When Minister Ralph Paget arrived in 1902, the area, by then known as Bang Rak, had become very busy and the legation was exposed to much pollution and noise from nearby rice mills, river and road traffic, as well as noisy neighbours which included a temple whose bells sounded every morning and a bar situated opposite run by an Italian lady named Madame Staro. Paget made suggestions for the relocation of the legation, but the government's response was unenthusiastic. It wasn't until 1922 that a new plot of land of about 12 acres (4.9 ha) in the Phloen Chit area was acquired from the Thai Chinese businessman Nai Lert. The old compound was sold to the Siamese Government, which used it as the site of Bangkok's General Post Office, for about £110,000. This was enough to pay for both the land and the construction of new buildings (completed in 1926), as the new site was in a rural swampy area—a fact which made the move highly unpopular at the time. Queen Victoria's statue and the flagpole were relocated to the new site, and a war memorial was also erected in 1923. The minister's (now ambassador's) residence served as the compound's main building.

The legation was re-established as the British Embassy in 1947, with Geoffrey Harrington Thompson becoming the first British Ambassador to Thailand. Several additional buildings have since been built, but the compound remained an oasis of greenery amidst its surroundings, which by the late 20th century had developed into part of the commercial city centre, containing luxury hotels, offices, apartments and shopping malls.

=== Redevelopment and sale ===
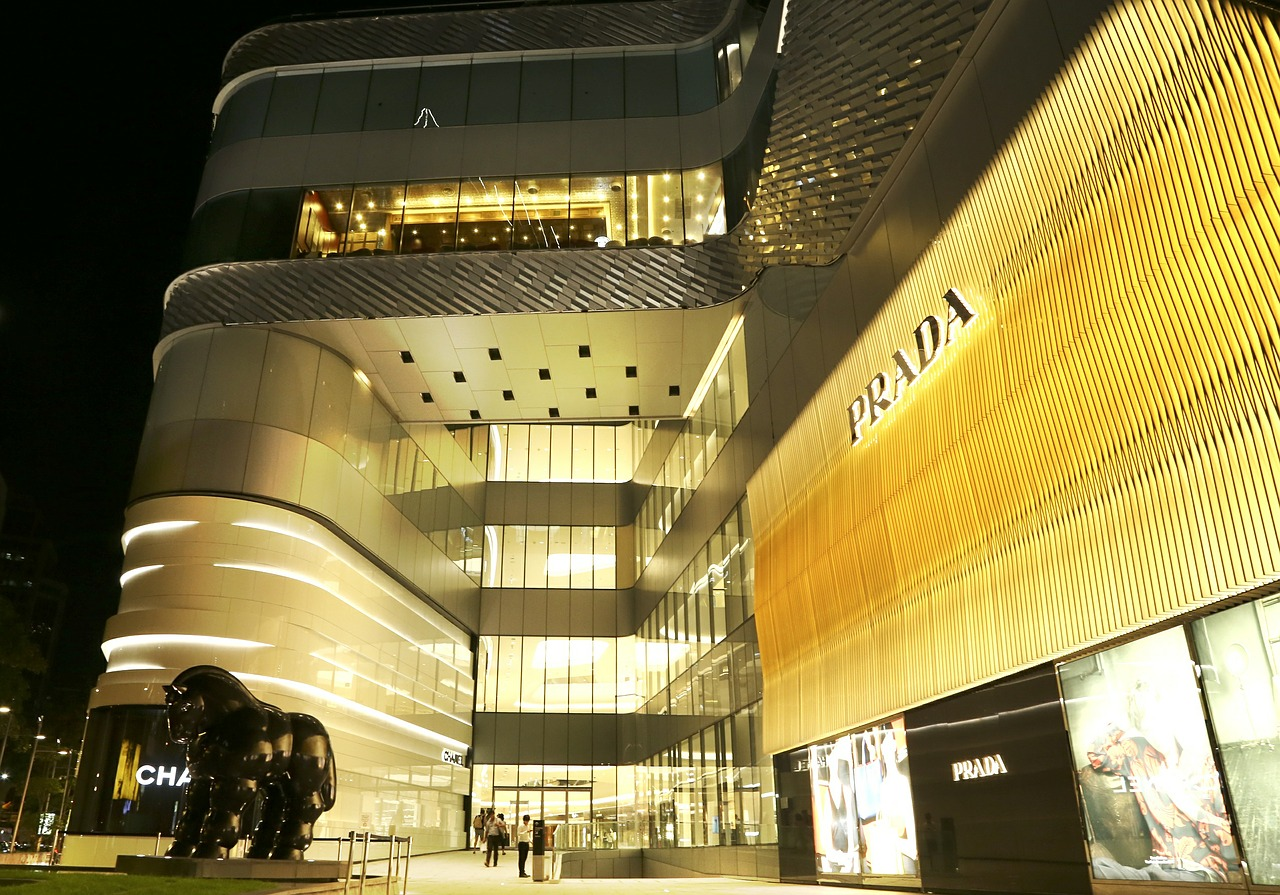
The Central Embassy shopping mall now stands on what used to be the front third of the embassy grounds.

In 2006, as part of its plan to downgrade several embassies and consulates to divert funds to other activities, the British Foreign and Commonwealth Office sold about 9 rai (1.4 ha; 3.6 acres) or about a third of the embassy's estate—the portion fronting Phloen Chit Road—to Tiang Chirathivat Real Estate Company, whose owners also operated Central Group. Queen Victoria's statue and the war memorial were relocated to accommodate the sale, which subsequently developed the land into the high-end Central Embassy shopping centre.

In 2017, the Foreign Office sold the remaining 23 rai (3.7 ha; 9.1 acres) of embassy land. The auction was again won by Central Group, who reportedly offered in the range of 2–2.2 million baht per square wa (4 m^{2}), placing the total price at over 18 billion baht (£420 million) and making it the highest-priced real estate deal in Thailand ever. The office issued a statement confirming the sale, to a joint venture of Central and Hongkong Land, in January 2018. The embassy is being relocated to AIA Sathorn Tower, an office building on Sathon Road. The war memorial has been relocated to the British Club, but Queen Victoria's statue will be transferred along with the site. By August 2019, the ambassador's residence was reported to have been demolished to make way for redevelopment.

== Features ==
Chancery/ambassador's residence
The chancery, or the embassy's main building, built during the years 1923–1926, was a two-storey building in British colonial style. W. A. R. Wood, the Consul-General in Chiang Mai, assisted the British Office of Works in its design, which was executed by Office architect Archibald Scott. The building followed a rectangular plan, was ventilated by numerous windows, and was decorated with wooden fretwork and stucco. Originally the minister's residence—and later the ambassador's, its lower floor later included embassy offices. The building received the ASA Architectural Conservation Award in 1984, and was listed as an unregistered ancient monument by the Fine Arts Department. Its demolition in 2019 prompted a critical letter from the Association of Siamese Architects, revoking the award and demanding its return.
Queen Victoria statue
The statue of Queen Victoria is a copy from the same mould of the statue at Winchester designed by Sir Alfred Gilbert for the Queen's golden jubilee. The plinth bears the inscription, "Victoria, Queen of Great Britain & Ireland, Empress of India. Erected in loving memory by her subjects in Siam. 1903." Originally situated outside the entrance gates to the legation on Charoen Krung Road, it was subsequently moved when the mission relocated to the new compound and again when part of the site was sold in 2007. The statue was boarded up when the consulate was occupied by the Japanese during World War II, but a peephole was left, symbolically allowing the Queen to see outside. The statue also used to be popular with local Thais, who would leave offerings in exchange for good fortune, help in exams, or success in bearing children.
War memorial
The war memorial, dedicated on 10 October 1922, was the first structure to be raised at the new Phloen Chit site. It is made of granite and was designed by the sculptor Sir James Taggart. Originally located behind the entrance gates, it was also moved to the front of the ambassador's residence in 2007. Following the sale of the embassy, the memorial was relocated to the British Club.

== Gallery ==
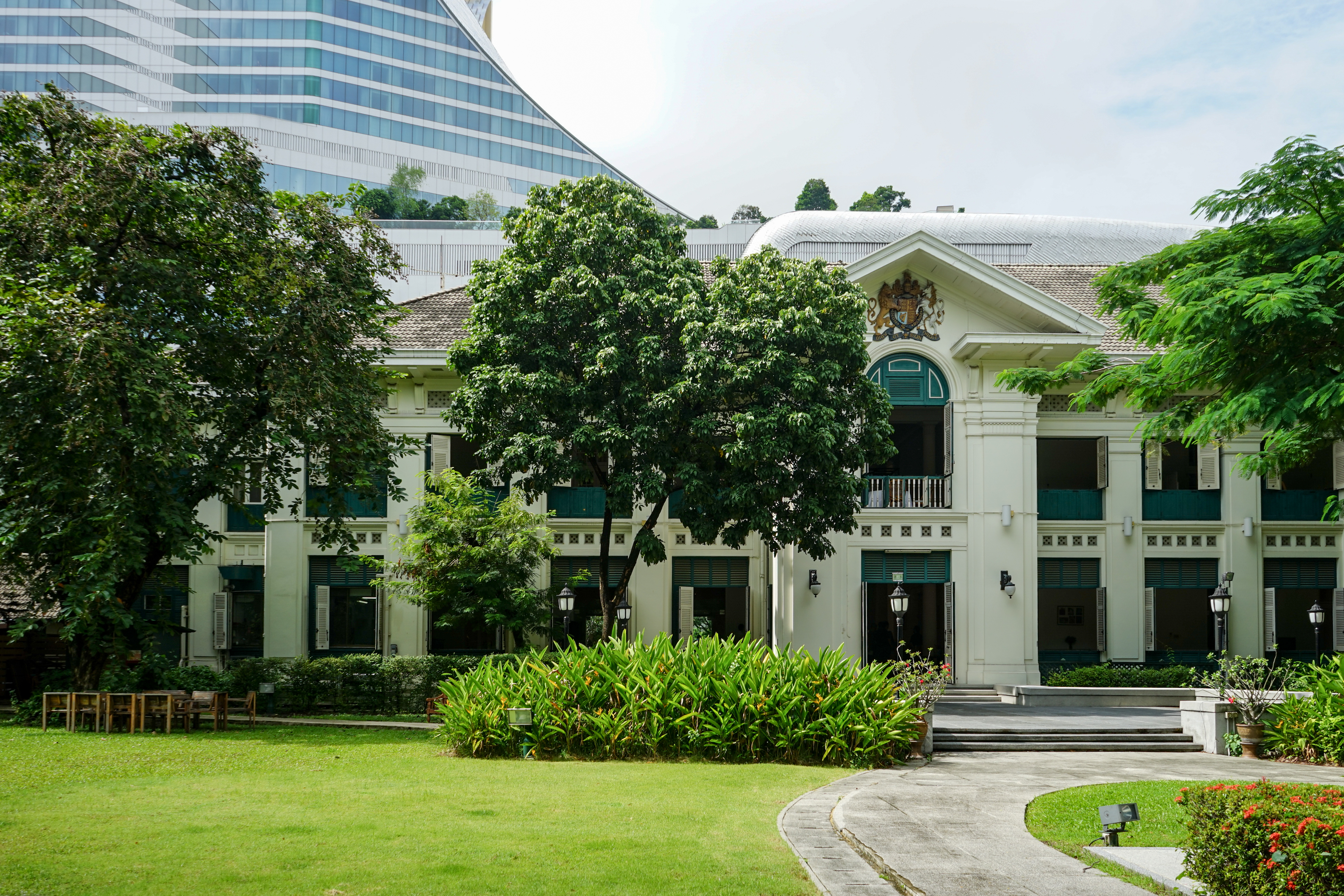
The Ambassador's Residence (rear façade)

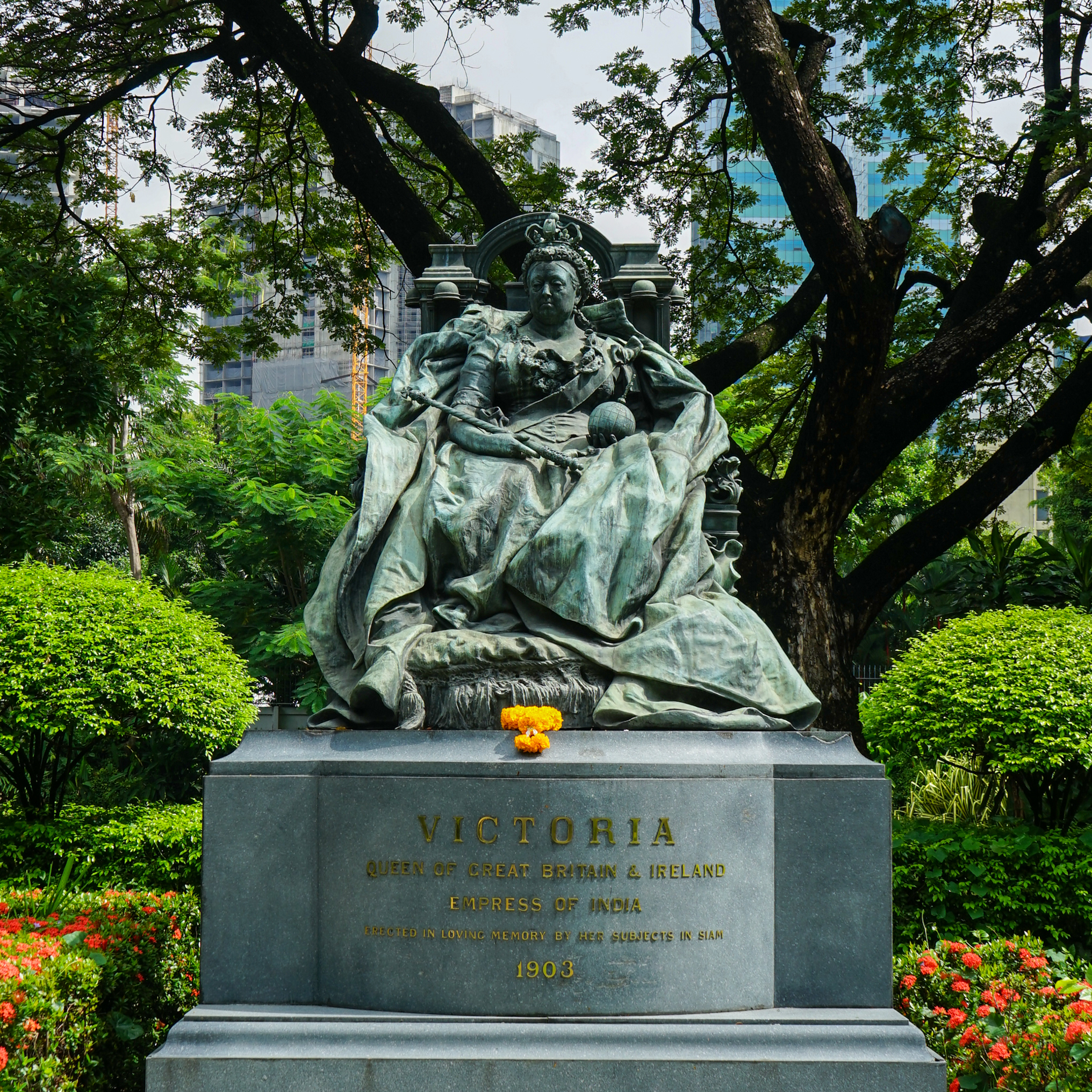
Queen Victoria statue

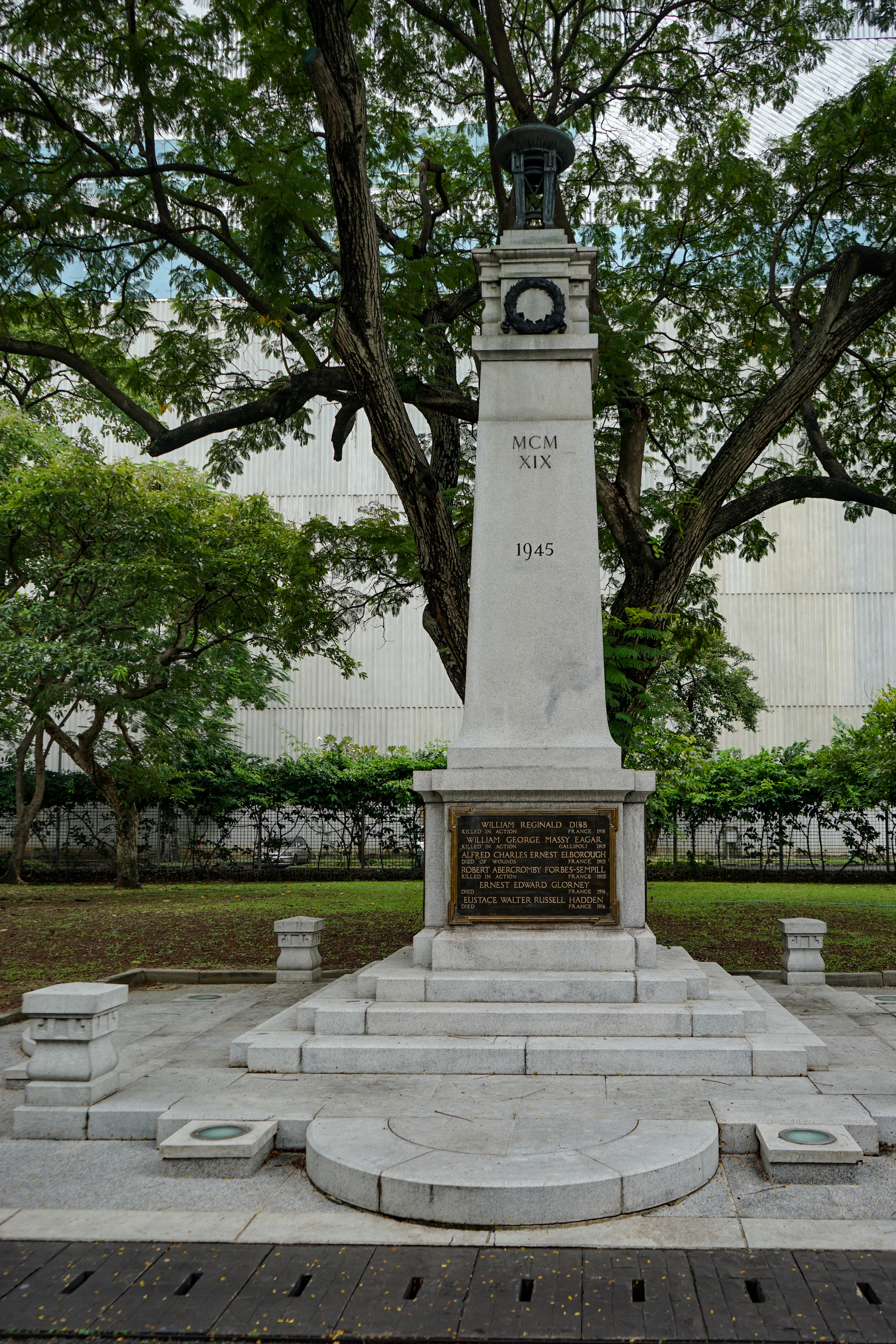
War memorial

== See also ==
- Thailand–United Kingdom relations
- Embassy of Thailand, London
