= Nai Lert =

Thai businessman

Phraya Bhakdi Noraset Lert Sreshthaputra
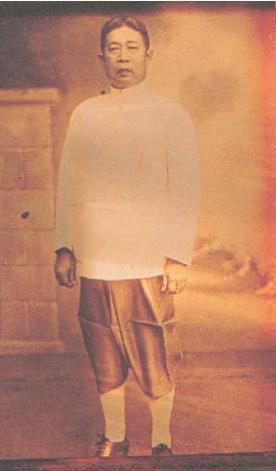
- Nai Lert in 1915
- Born: June 22, 1872; Bangkok, Siam
- Died: December 15, 1945 (aged 73); Bangkok, Siam
- Occupations: Developer; Investor; Philanthropist
- Spouse: Khunying Sin
- Children: Thanpuying Lursakdi Sampatisiri

Lert Sreshthaputra (Thai: เลิศ เศรษฐบุตร), or Nai Lert (นายเลิศ, literally "Mr. Lert"), was known as a Thailand’s first and foremost developer, investor as well as preserver of Bangkok’s environment. He was royally bestowed a title “Beloved Millionaire” by King Rama VI and became known as Phraya Bhakdi Noraset.

== Early life ==
Nai Lert was born at his family’s home near the foot of Wat Bophitphimook Bridge at the mouth of Klong Ong Ang on June 22, 1872. He came from a distinguished background; his father, Chuen Sreshthaputra, was one of the sons of Luang Prasertwanit and a nephew of Phra Prasertwanit, who was the founder of the Sreshthaputra family. His family was of Thai Chinese descent. After an education at Suan Ananta School that included a study of the English language Nai Lert started working for various firms and ended up becoming partner at the Singapore Strait Company (later to become Fraser and Neave) by the age of 20.

== Business ventures ==
At the age of 22, Nai Lert started an imported goods business called Nai Lert Store and among other products offered the first ice to be made in Thailand. The site for Nai Lert's Ice works which faced the original canal that subsequently was filled in to become Krungthep-Samut Prakan Road in 1939 is now in the area of Sukhumvit Rd between Soi 5 & 7 (for which both Sois bear the name Soi Nai Lert).. Parts of the original ice works dating back to the early 1900s form part of the back wall of The Copacabana club (built in 1957) which was one of the original multi-story buildings in the Wattana area. The original doors and cellar entrances were re-discovered in 2016 during renovations to the well known nightclub which was renamed Checkinn99. The distinguished Scholar Phraya Anuman Rajdhon would later on describe the exciting novelty of ice as "Most people who had never seen it refused to believe that there was such a thing as frozen water. Ice had to be put on a tray and exhibited for the people to see at a museum which was then in the Sala Sahathai building. Some people even asked to take small cubes of ice for those at home to see. The old saying 'to make a solid shape out of water,' had been proved possible."

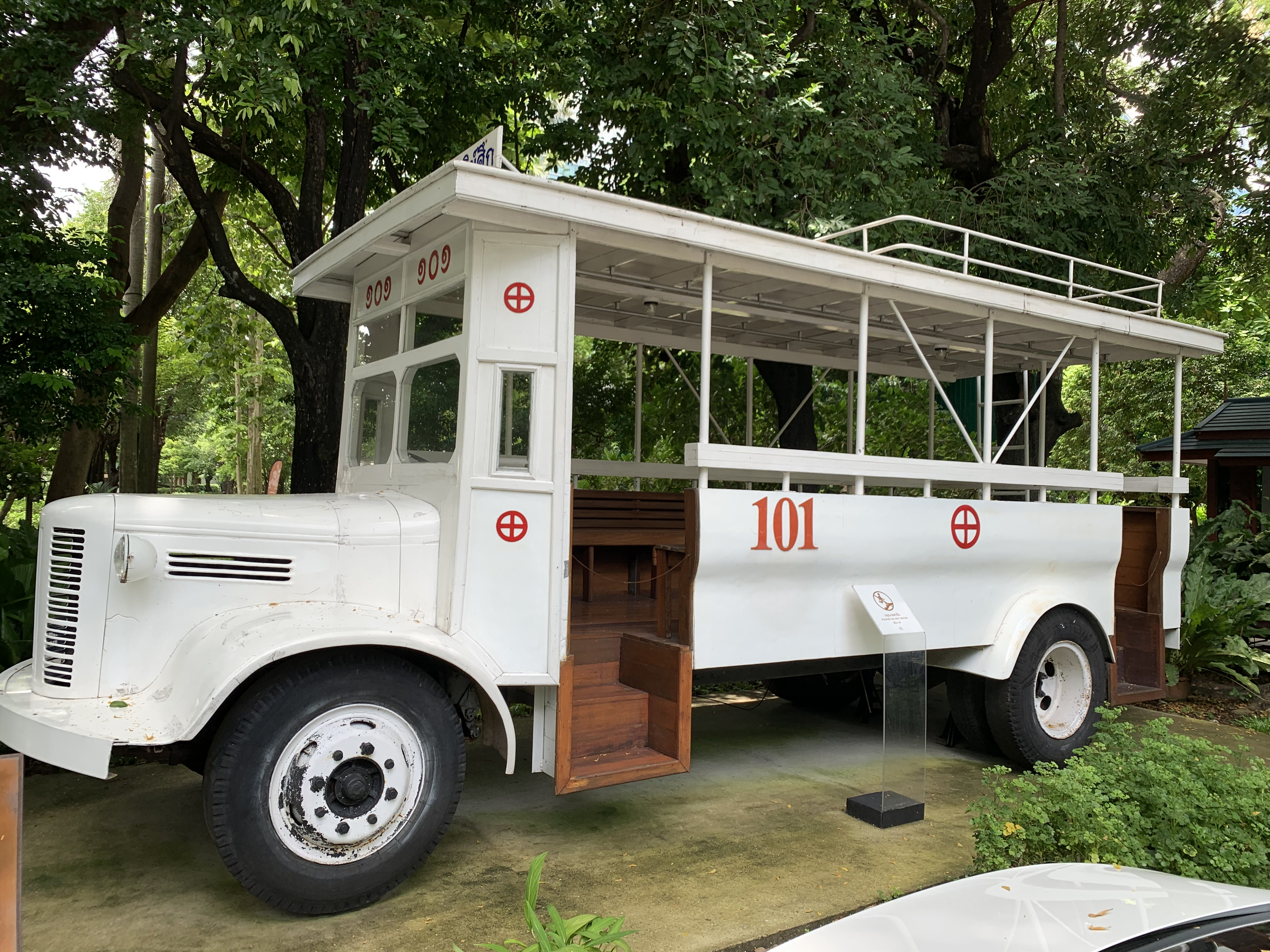
One of Nai Lert's buses

Though Nai Lert continued to make his headquarters near the original shop, he soon expanded into other businesses in other parts of the city. One was a guesthouse called the Hotel de la Paix thereby creating the first hotel property of the family business. Nai Lert also expanded his business into a transportation and real estate empire. He introduced the first bus services, named Rot Mail Nai Lert, in Thailand in 1907 to serve Bangkok commuters and later expanded the business into the first taxi service using imported cars, the White Boat company operating pleasure boats, seagoing vessels and a public transportation service along the Klong Saen Saep from Pratunam. He is also credited for creating the first Bangkok bus service launching an even more innovative venture, the White Bus Company. The first route ran between Pratunam and Yotse Bridge near Wat Thepsirin on Klong Padung Krung Kasem; later several other routes were added, including one to Silom Road. A novel convenience to commuters from the countryside was that passengers travelling by ferry could use the same ticket when transferring to the bus at Pratunam.

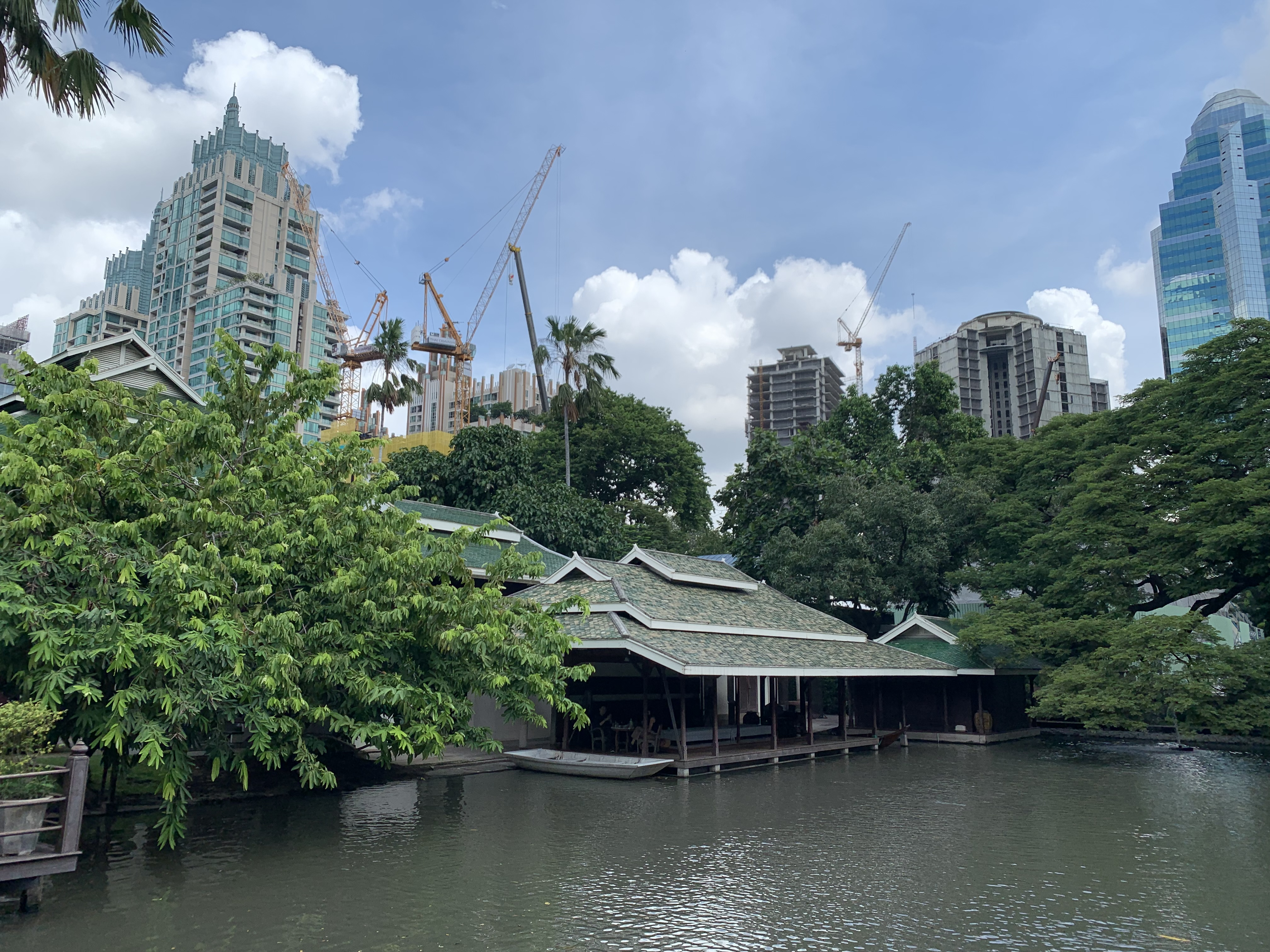
Nai Lert Park Heritage Home amongst urban sprawls of Phloen Chit

Nai Lert was also at the origin of the development of the Phloen Chit area where he acquired a large piece of land in 1915 and created one of the first developments in Bangkok by master planning the area and selling off parts of the land as individual plots including the existing British Embassy site on Ploenchit which was sold to the British Government in 1922 . He was also at the forefront of innovation creating the first ice factory in Thailand, building the tallest commercial building in Bangkok in 1927 and importing motor vehicles from Europe and the US.

== Death and legacy ==
A few months after the end of World War II, Nai Lert died on December 15, 1945, leaving his business empire to his wife and his only descendant, his daughter Thanpuying Lursakdi Sampatisiri. His legacy included a real estate and hotel group operating several office buildings, retail centers and a hotel in Bangkok, Swissôtel Nai Lert Park Hotel, a foundation named after him and his beloved wife Khunying Sin, the Lerd-Sinn Foundation and a history of deeply held self beliefs of philanthropy and love of nature. The Nai Lert Park Heritage Home opened to the public in 2016.
