= Witthayu Road =

Road in Bangkok, Thailand

Coordinates: 13°44′0″N 100°32′45″E

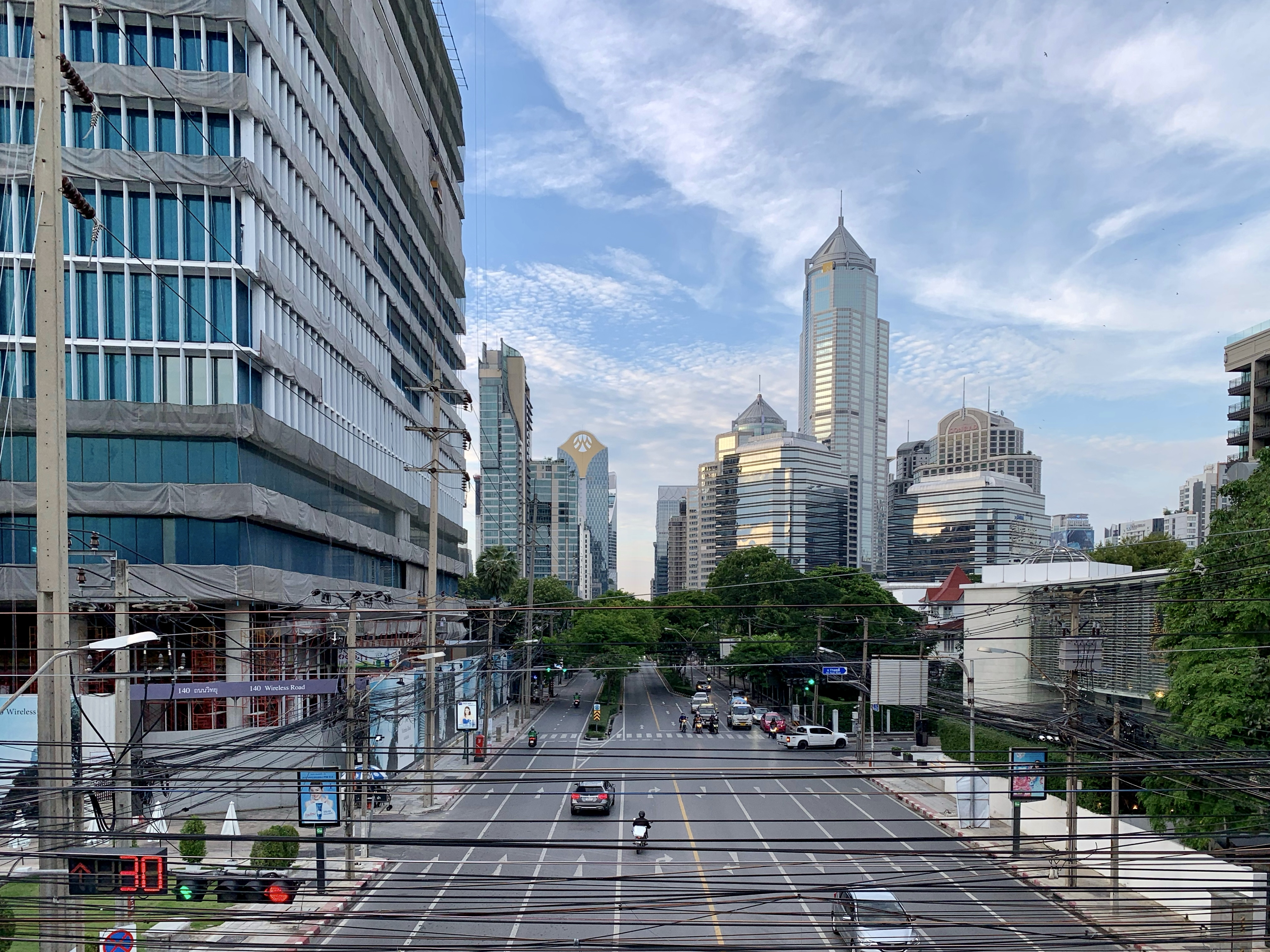
Witthayu Road, looking north from Sarasin Junction at the corner of Lumphini Park

Witthayu Road (Thai: ถนนวิทยุ, RTGS: Thanon Witthayu, pronounced [tʰā.nǒn wít.tʰā.júʔ], lit. "Radio Road"), also known as Wireless Road, is a road in Bangkok, located almost entirely in Lumphini subdistrict of Pathum Wan district. It originally linked Phloen Chit Road to Rama IV Road, running from what is now Phloen Chit Intersection to Witthayu Intersection, where it continues on as Sathon Road. It was extended from the Phloen Chit end to cross the Saen Saep Canal and meet Phetchaburi Road in 1972, reaching a total distance of 2.6 kilometres (1.6 mi).

Tree-lined and in parts divided into three carriageways, Witthayu Road is one of the greener streets passing through the city centre, as it runs along the length of Lumphini Park, the leafy campuses of the American, Dutch and British Embassies, as well as Nai Lert Park, originally the home of the eponymous Chinese businessman who developed the area in the 1920s. Several other countries also have embassies on the road or within the office towers of All Seasons Place.

The road received its name (which literally means "radio") from the fact that it passed by Saladaeng Radiotelegraph Station), one of Thailand's earliest radio transmitter stations. The area of the station, on the corner of Witthayu and Rama IV Roads, later became the site of the Armed Forces Academies Preparatory School (1961–2000) and then Suan Lum Night Bazaar (2001–2010). Frasers Property, a subsidiary of TCC Group, is currently building One Bangkok in this area (together with that of the former Lumpinee Boxing Stadium (1956–2014)). Lumphini Station of the MRT Blue Line serves the area.

== Gallery ==
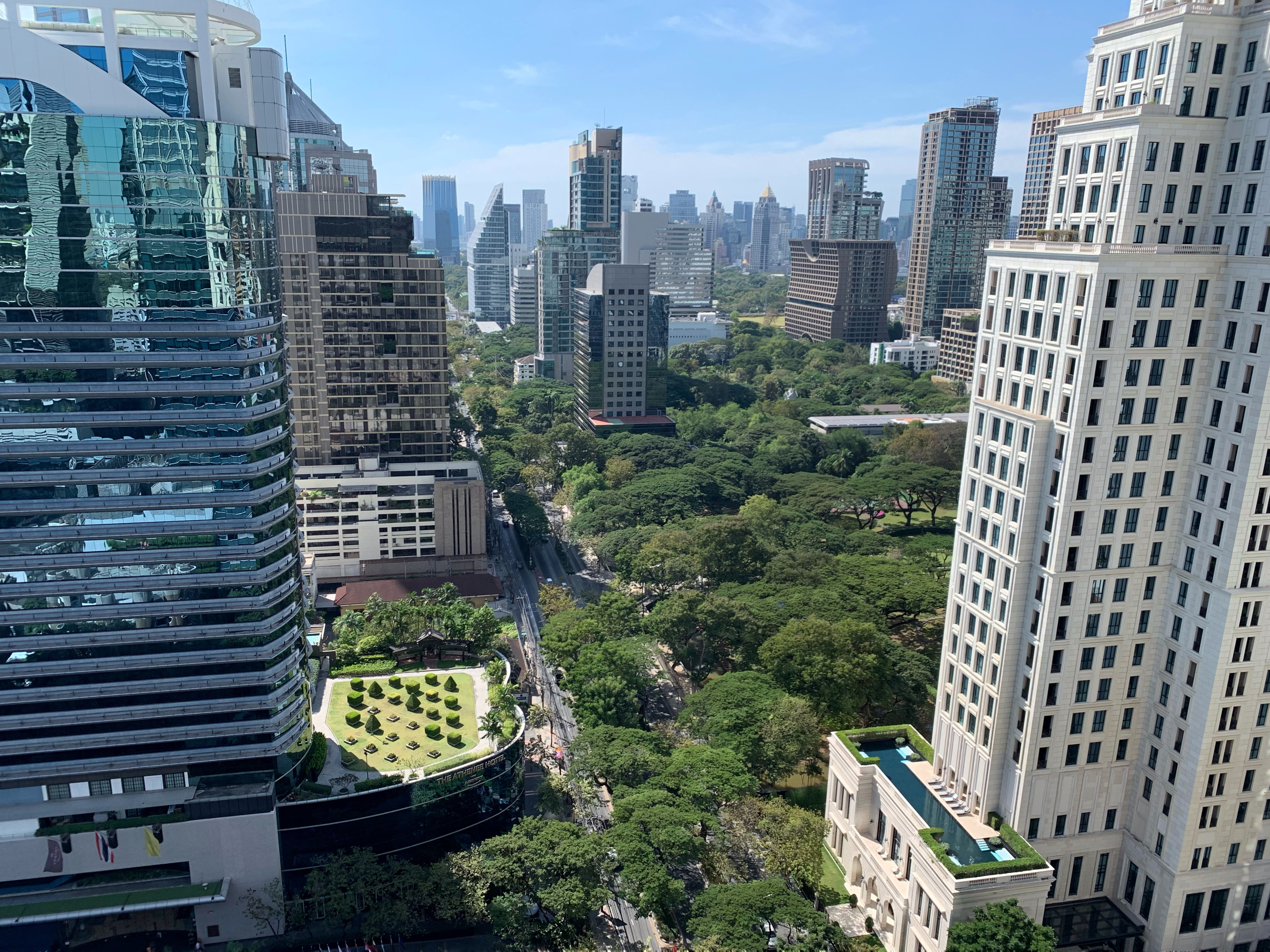
Witthayu Road from above

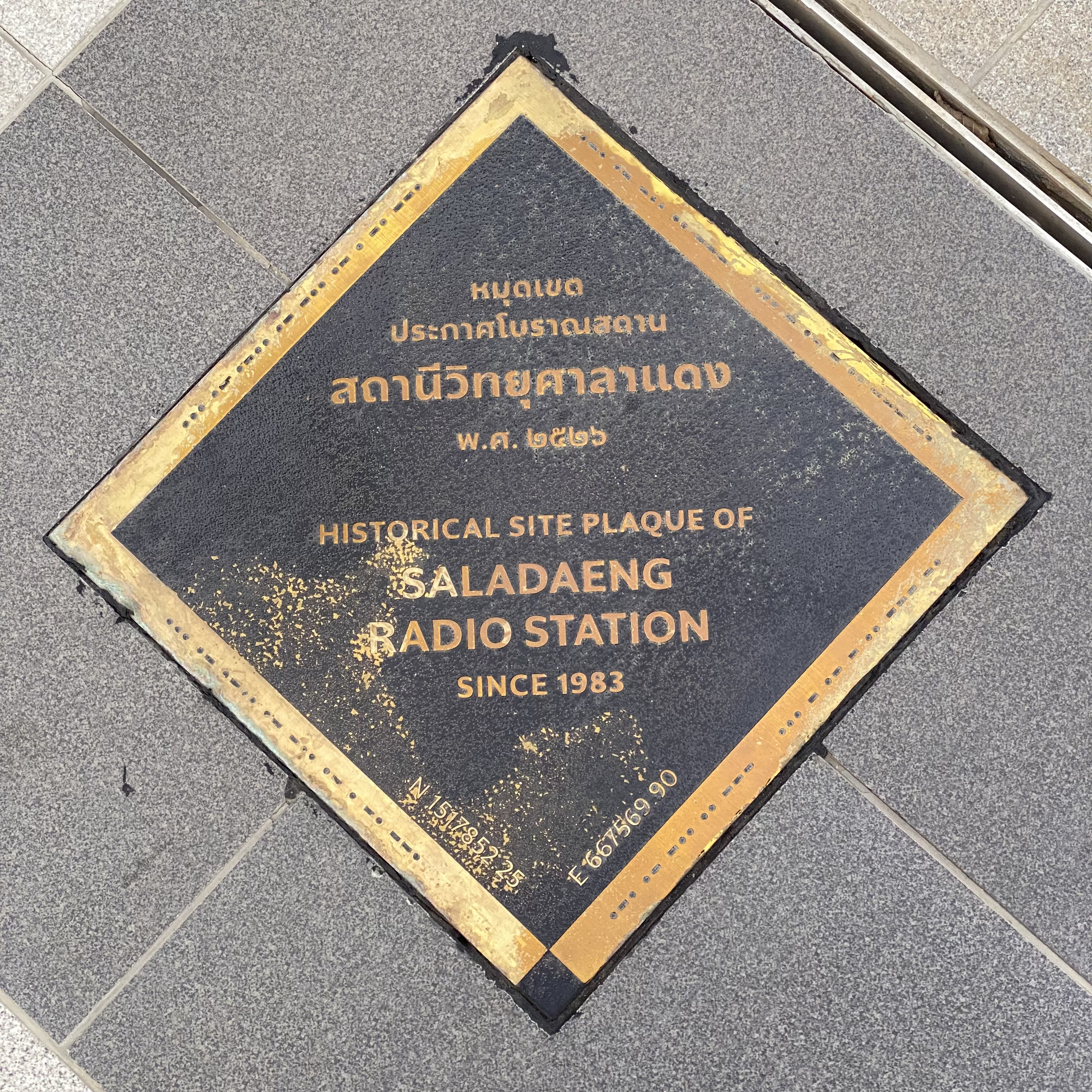
Commemorative plaque noting the historical location of the radio station which gave the road its name, at One Bangkok
