= Beijing central business district =

Financial, media, and business center of Beijing, China

Coordinates: 39.9085°N 116.453°E

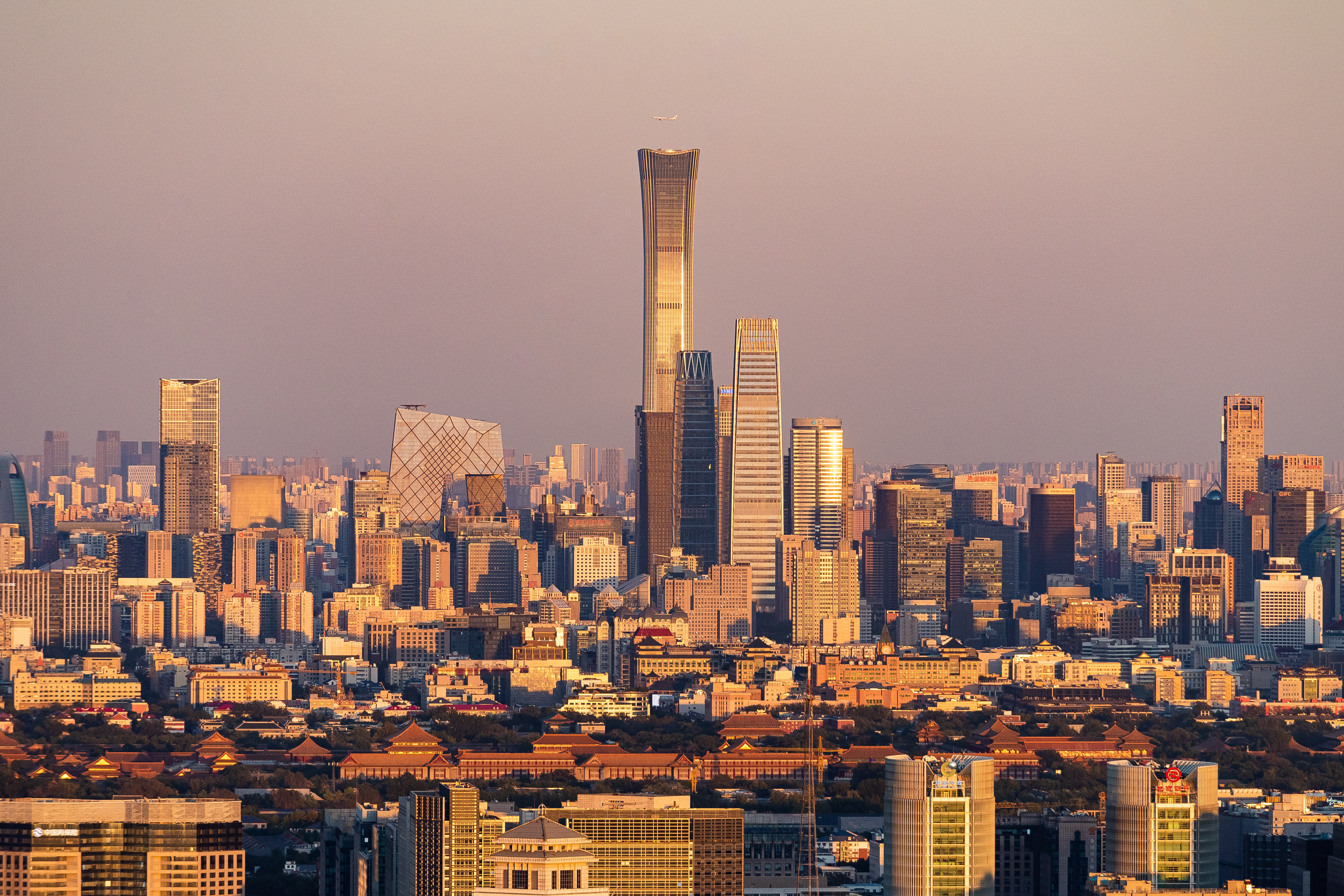
Beijing CBD and the Forbidden City, taken from Central Radio & TV Tower in October 2021

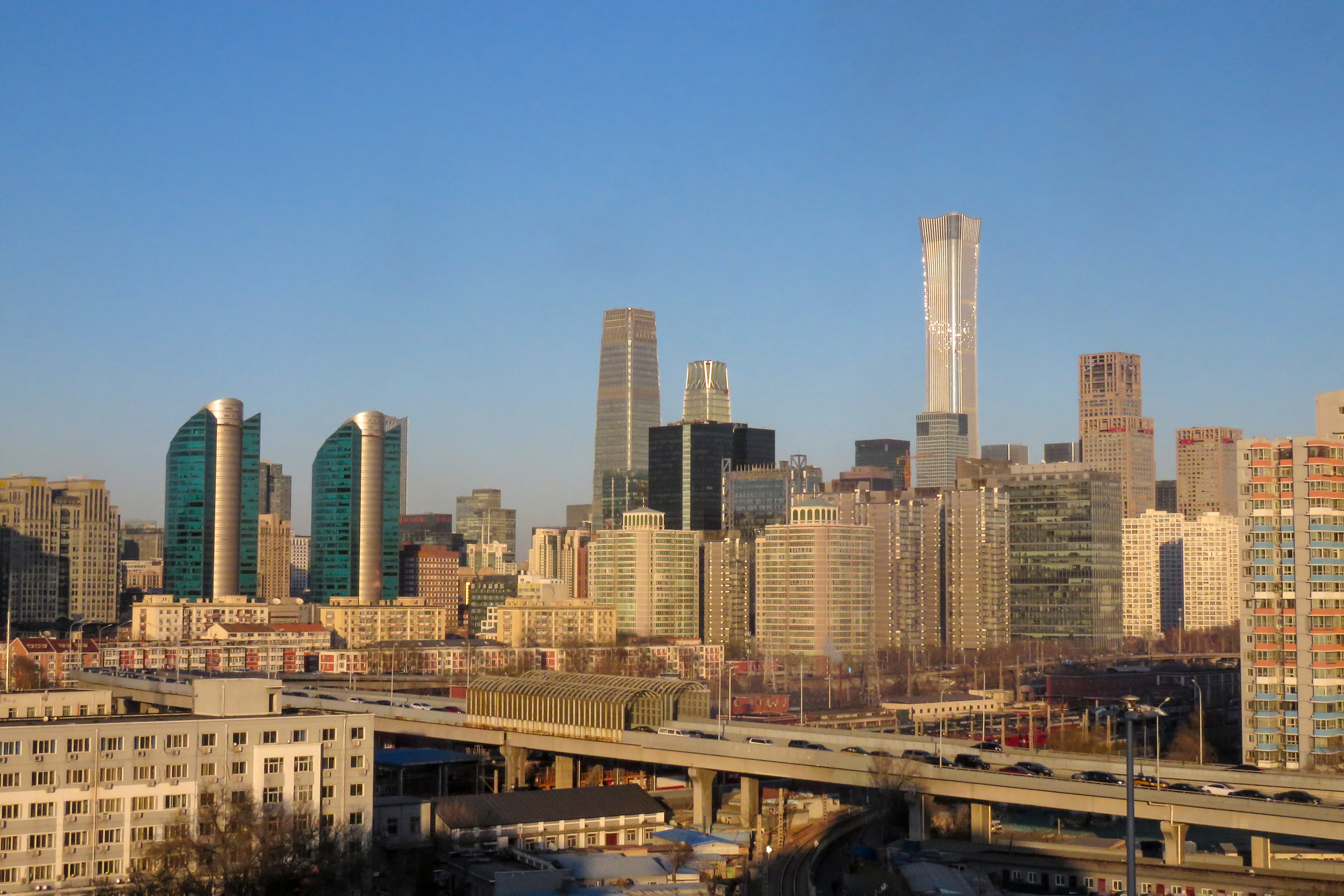
Beijing's CBD in January 2019 with the newly completed CITIC Tower (China Zun)

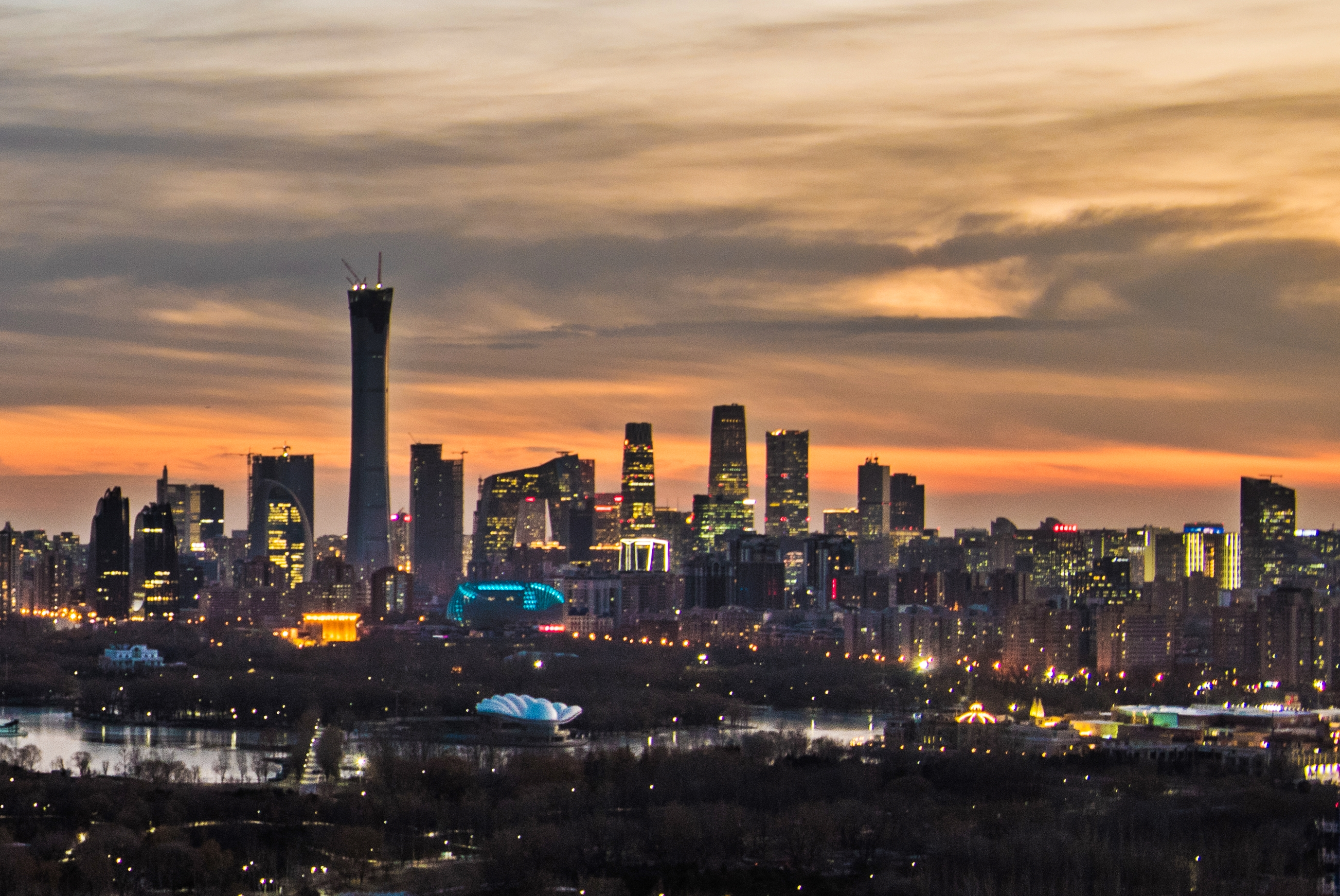
Beijing's CBD in December 2017

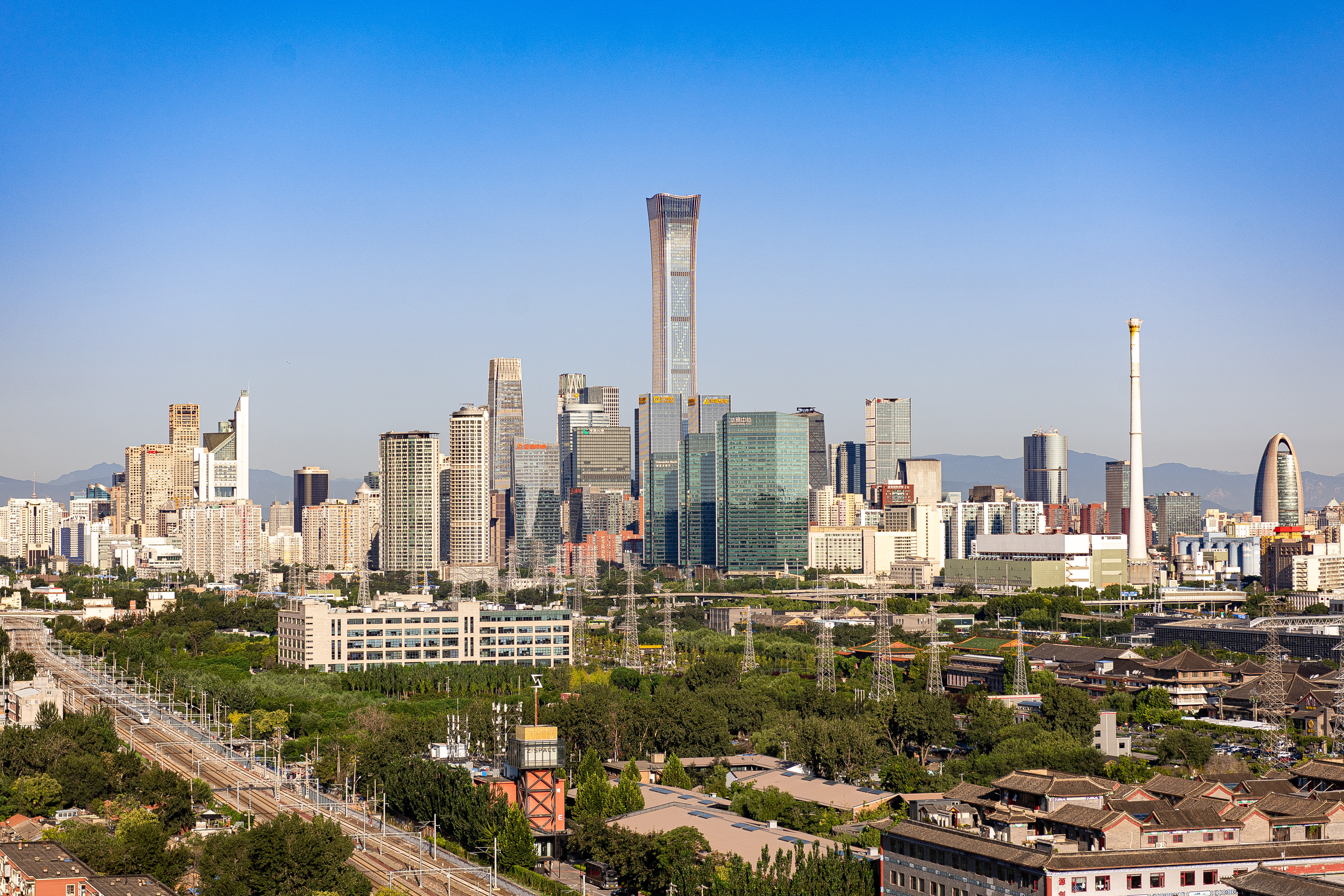
Beijing CBD as taken from the southeast in September 2021

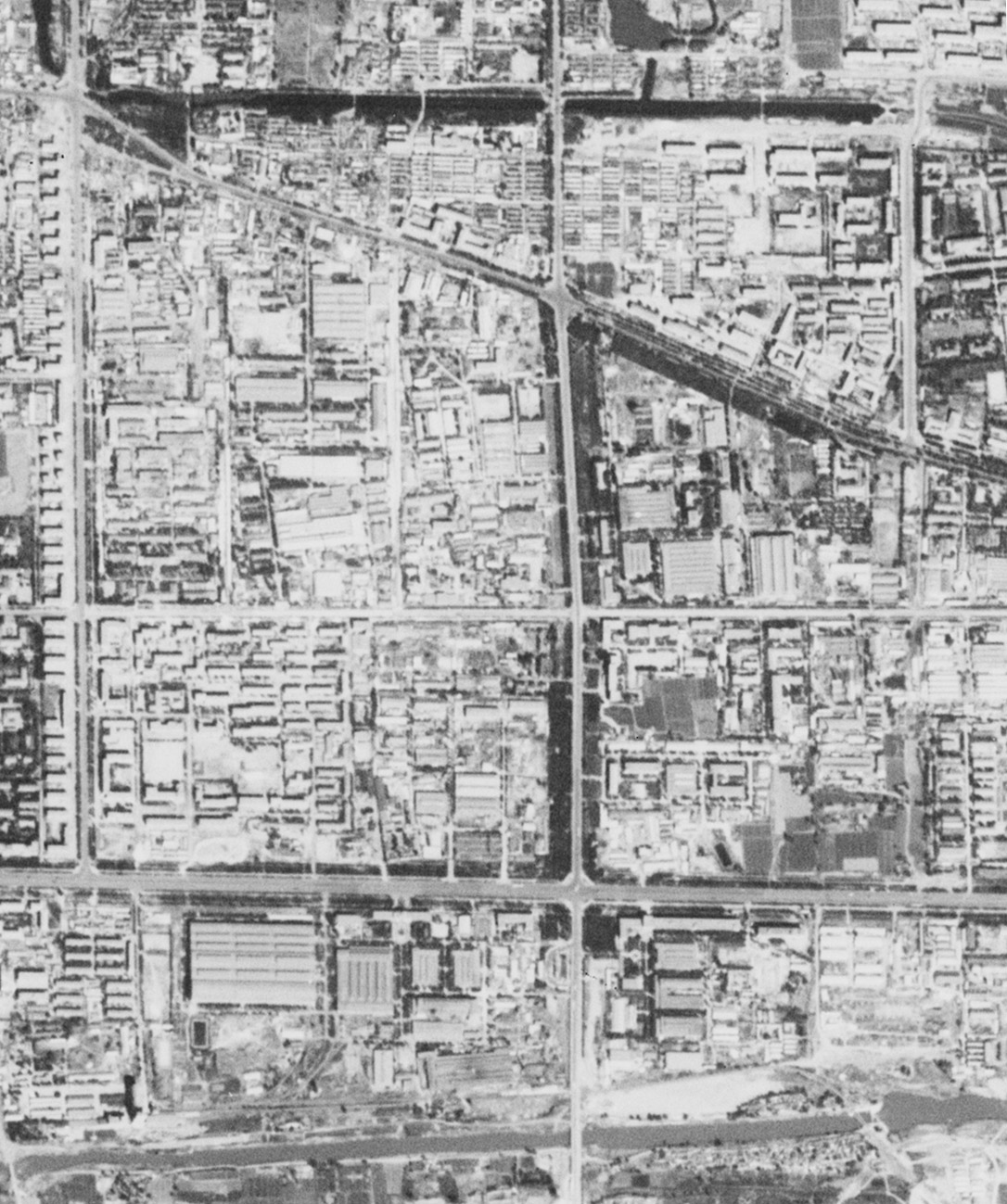
Beijing CBD before development. (1967-09-20)

The Beijing central business district, or Beijing CBD (Chinese: 北京商务中心区; pinyin: Běijīng Shāngwù Zhōngxīn Qū), is a central business district and the primary area for finance, media, and business services in Beijing, China.

Beijing CBD occupies 3.99 km^{2} of the Chaoyang District on the east side of the city. Geographically situated to the east of the city center, sandwiched between the 3rd Ring Road and the 4th Ring Road, the Beijing CBD is currently undergoing large-scale development.

== Economic history and importance ==
As Beijing is becoming one of the most important international financial centers in China, Beijing CBD was recently positioned as the secondary core area in Beijing's International Financial Center Development strategic plan published in May, 2008. Beijing CBD is also emerging as China's media center as Beijing Television Station (BTV) just moved in its new headquarters (Beijing TV Centre) in this area and the new CCTV Headquarters was officially opened on the night of 15 June 2008.

In the eight years since the government decided to speed up construction of the district, the Beijing CBD has attracted 117 Fortune 500 businesses in the financial, media, information technology, consulting and service industries. More than 60 percent of overseas-funded companies in Beijing are in the CBD. A majority of foreign embassies in Beijing - the No 1, No 2 and No 3 embassy districts are now concentrated in the Beijing CBD and its neighboring areas.

The Beijing CBD Administrative Committee, established in 2001, is in charge of planning and management and aims to facilitate investments and improve the work environment for professionals. The committee provides information to investors on laws, taxes and state policies as well as a one-stop service, which has simplified approval procedures and raised efficiency.

The establishment of the Beijing CBD Chamber of Finance, the Beijing CBD Chamber of Media Industry and Beijing CBD Association of Property Management & Real Estate Development has facilitated communication and cooperation between the government and enterprises. The Beijing CBD International Business Festival and Beijing CBD International Forum have put the Beijing CBD on the map worldwide.

== Skyscrapers in the Beijing CBD ==
- China Zun
- China World Trade Center Tower III
- Beijing Yintai Centre
- Beijing TV Centre
- Fortune Plaza
- CCTV Headquarters
- Jing Guang Centre
- China World Trade Center
- China World Trade Center Tower III Phase B

== Education ==
- Beijing Ritan High School
- Beijing CBD Experimental School (北京市中央商务区实验学校)
- Beijing Zhongxue (Beijing High School) – CBD / Business-District Experimental
- Tsinghua Affiliated Primary School — CBD Campus (“清华附小商务中心区实验小学”)
- Beijing No. 11 Chaoyang Experimental School (“北京市十一学校朝阳实验学校”)
- Beijing City International School (BCIS, 北京乐成国际学校)
- Canadian International School of Beijing (CISB)
- Western Academy of Beijing (WAB)
- Yew Chung International School of Beijing (YCIS Beijing)
- Korean International School in Beijing
- Harrow International School Beijing

== See also ==
- Beijing Financial Street
- List of economic and technological development zones in Beijing
