= Phoenix New Town =

Phoenix New City 凤凰新城
- Country: China
- District Gov. Established: 2007

Government

Area
  - Total: 23 km^{2} (8.9 sq mi)

Population (2010)
  - Total: 500,000
  - Density: 22,000/km^{2} (56,000/sq mi)
- Time zone: UTC+8 (China Standard Time)
- Area Code: 0315
- Website: www.tangshan.gov.cn

Phoenix New City
- Simplified Chinese: 凤凰新城
- Traditional Chinese: 鳳凰新城
Transcriptions
Standard Mandarin
- Hanyu Pinyin: Fènghuáng Xīn Chéng

Phoenix New City or Phoenix New Town (simplified Chinese: 凤凰新城; traditional Chinese: 鳳凰新城) is a special district of Tangshan, China that is largely residential and includes several upscale apartment blocks. It is described by various tourism websites as an eco-oriented urban township situated adjacent to the city's financial and commercial district.

The name is likely a reference to the city's near-total destruction during the 1976 earthquake, one of the deadliest natural disasters in China. Tangshan is one of China's oldest industrial bases.

Part of Phoenix New Town includes the Tangshan Kerry property, a mixed-use development project featuring a shopping mall, park, and Shangri-La Hotel. The project was a $1.07 billion venture by the Hong Kong Kerry Group and three partner groups.

== See also ==
- Binhai New Area (Tianjin)
- Beijing CBD
- Central, Hong Kong
