= China Media Group Headquarters =

- 中央广播电视总台总部大楼
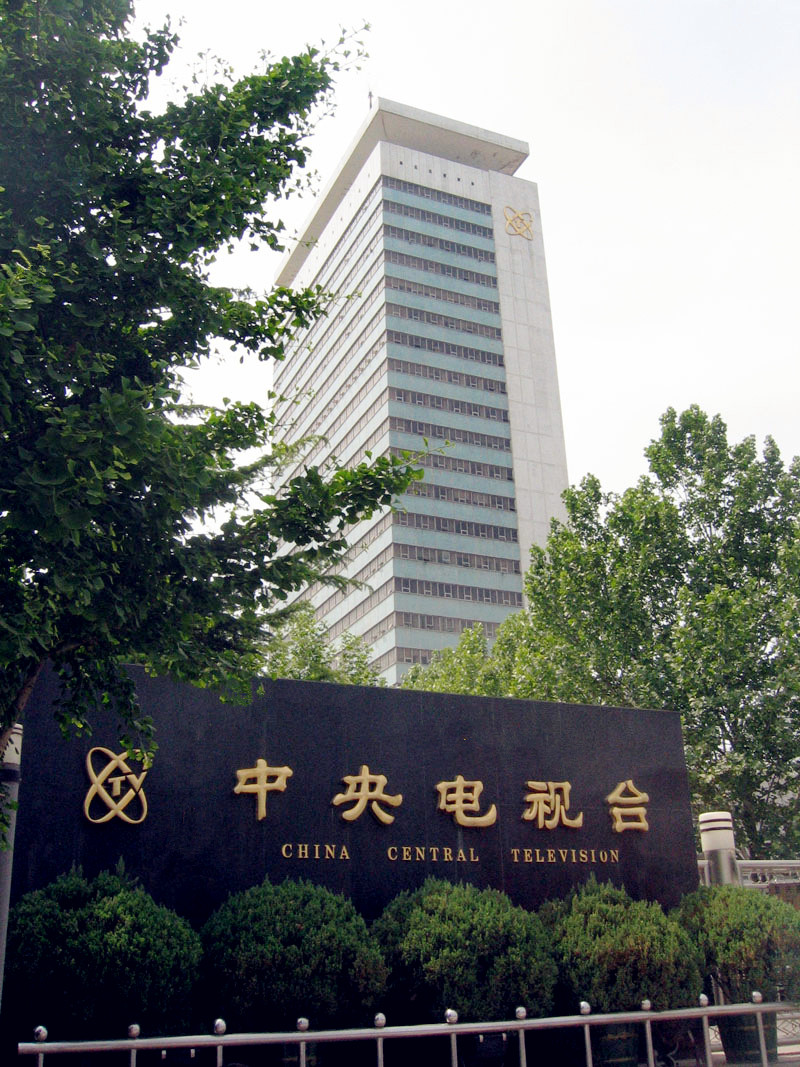
- Interactive map of the China Media Group Headquarters area
- Former names: CCTV Headquarters (1988–2013)
- Alternative names: CMG Headquarters; CMG Office Block at Fuxing Road; CCTV Building; Central Color TV Center

General information
- Type: Commercial offices
- Architectural style: Modernism
- Location: 11 Fuxing Road; Haidian, Beijing, China
- Coordinates: 39.907761°N 116.311956°E
- Construction started: 1983
- Completed: 1986
- Owner: China Media Group
- Operator: China Media Group

Height
- Roof: 112 m (367 ft)

Technical details
- Floor count: 27

Design and construction
- Developer: China Media Group

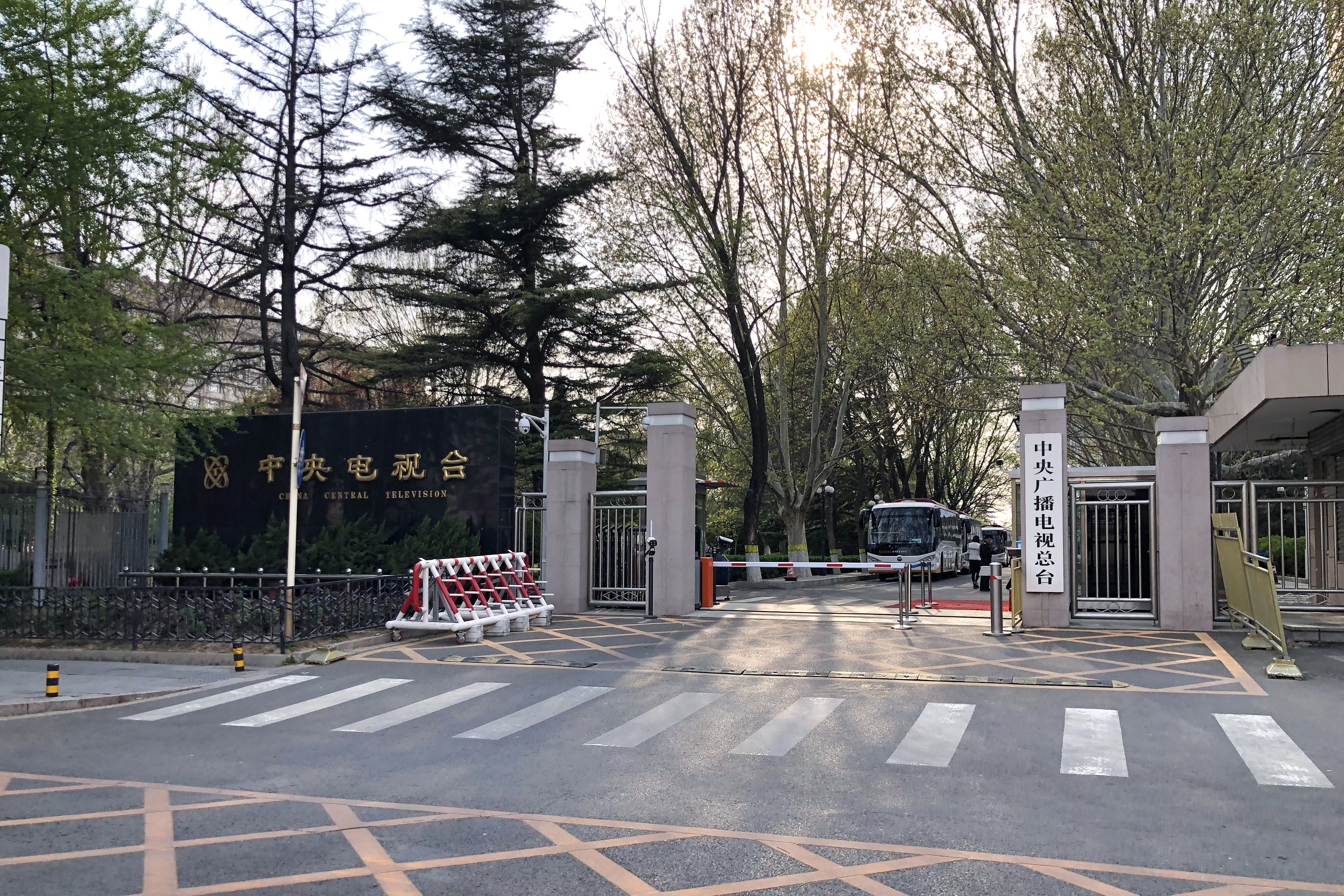
East gate of CMG headquarters with the sign of CMG and the former logo of CCTV

The China Media Group Headquarters is a 112 m (367 ft), 27-story-tall office tower and television complex at 11 Fuxing Road in Yangfangdian, Haidian, Beijing, China. Construction began in 1983 and was completed in 1986 with the official opening in 1987. It was named CCTV Headquarters or CCTV Building at the time was official inaugurated on 1988. The tower served as the headquarters for China Media Group since 2018, and it formerly served as the headquarters for China Central Television until 2013 when the new headquarters were officially inaugurated on East Third Ring Road, Guanghua Road, some 15 km (9.3 mi) to the east.

== See also ==
- List of tallest buildings in Beijing

Media buildings in Beijing

- China Media Group Headquarters
- Central Radio & TV Tower
- CCTV Headquarters
- Beijing Television Cultural Center
- Beijing TV Centre
- Phoenix Center
