= Beijing Television Cultural Center =

Skyscraper in the Central Business District of Beijing, China

Television Cultural Center
- 中央广播电视总台电视文化中心
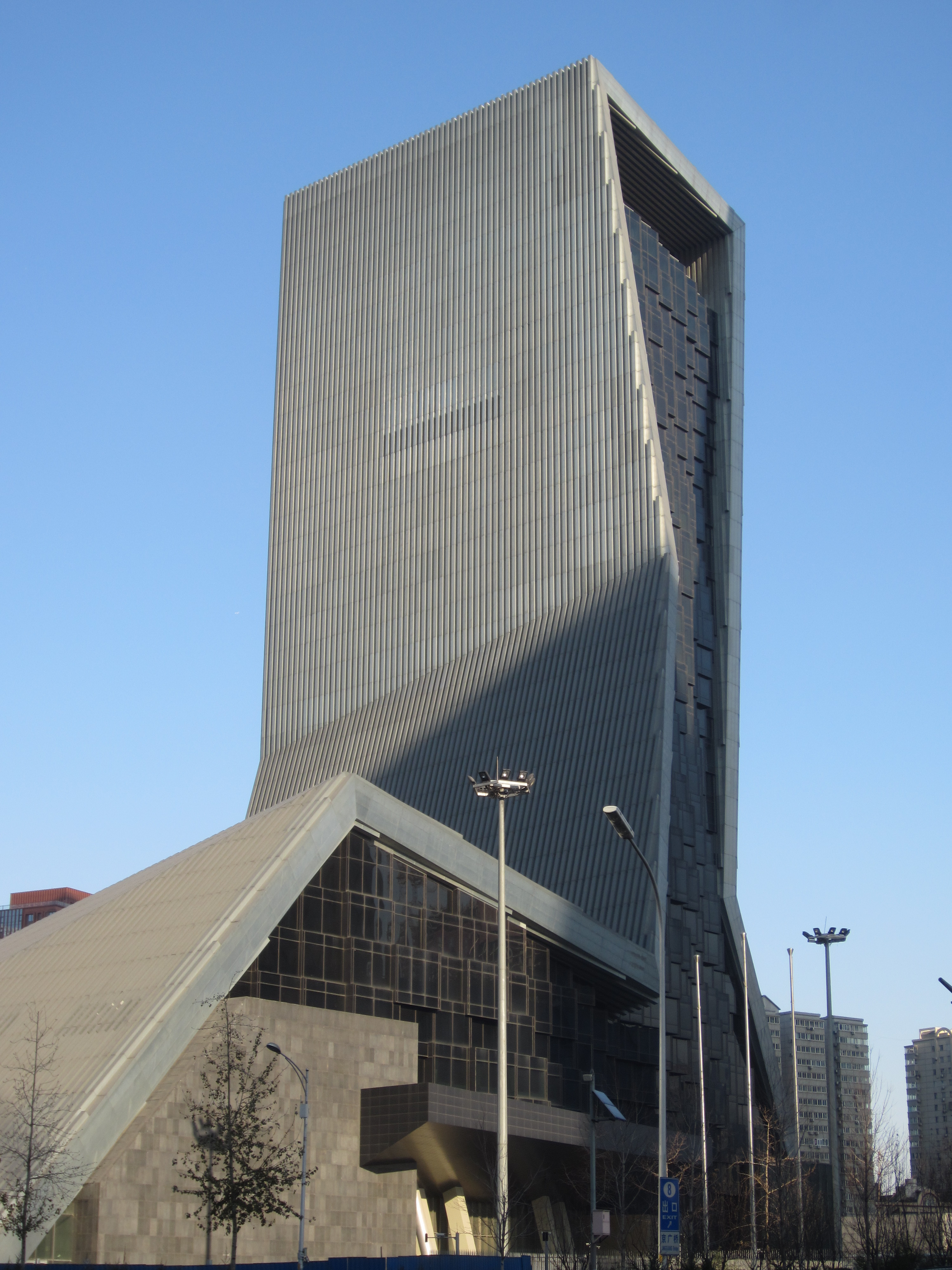
- The building in 2016
- Alternative names: China Media Group Television Cultural Center

General information
- Status: Completed
- Location: (China) Beijing
- Coordinates: 39°54′56″N 116°27′28″E
- Construction started: 2004
- Completed: 2009
- Opening: 29 April 2026
- Owner: China Media Group

Height
- Roof: 159 m (522 ft)

Technical details
- Floor count: 34

Design and construction
- Architects: Rem Koolhaas and Ole Scheeren

The Television Cultural Center (TVCC; Chinese: 中央广播电视总台电视文化中心) is a 34-story skyscraper on East Third Ring Road, Guanghua Road in the Central Business District (CBD) of Beijing, China. Featuring a hotel, a theater, and several television studios, the building was scheduled to open in mid-May 2009. Following a major fire during construction, however, the building's opening was delayed until 29 April 2026.

== Planning ==
The Office for Metropolitan Architecture won the contract from the Beijing International Tendering Co. to construct the CCTV Headquarters and the Television Cultural Center by its side on December 20, 2002. It accommodates visitors and guests, and will be freely accessible to the public. On the ground floor, a continuous lobby provides access to the 1500-seat theater, a large ballroom, digital cinemas, recording studios and exhibition facilities. The cultural complex was designed with the cooperation of dUCKS scéno for the scenography and theater consultancy. and of DHV for the acoustics studies. The building hosted the international broadcasting center for the 2008 Olympic Games. Before the fire, the building also contained a completed five-star Mandarin Oriental hotel, which was destroyed and never opened. Guests would have entered at a dedicated drop-off from the east of the building and ascended to the fifth floor housing the check-in as well as restaurants, lounges, and conference rooms. The hotel rooms occupied both sides of the tower, forming a spectacular atrium above the landscape of public facilities.

== 2009 fire ==
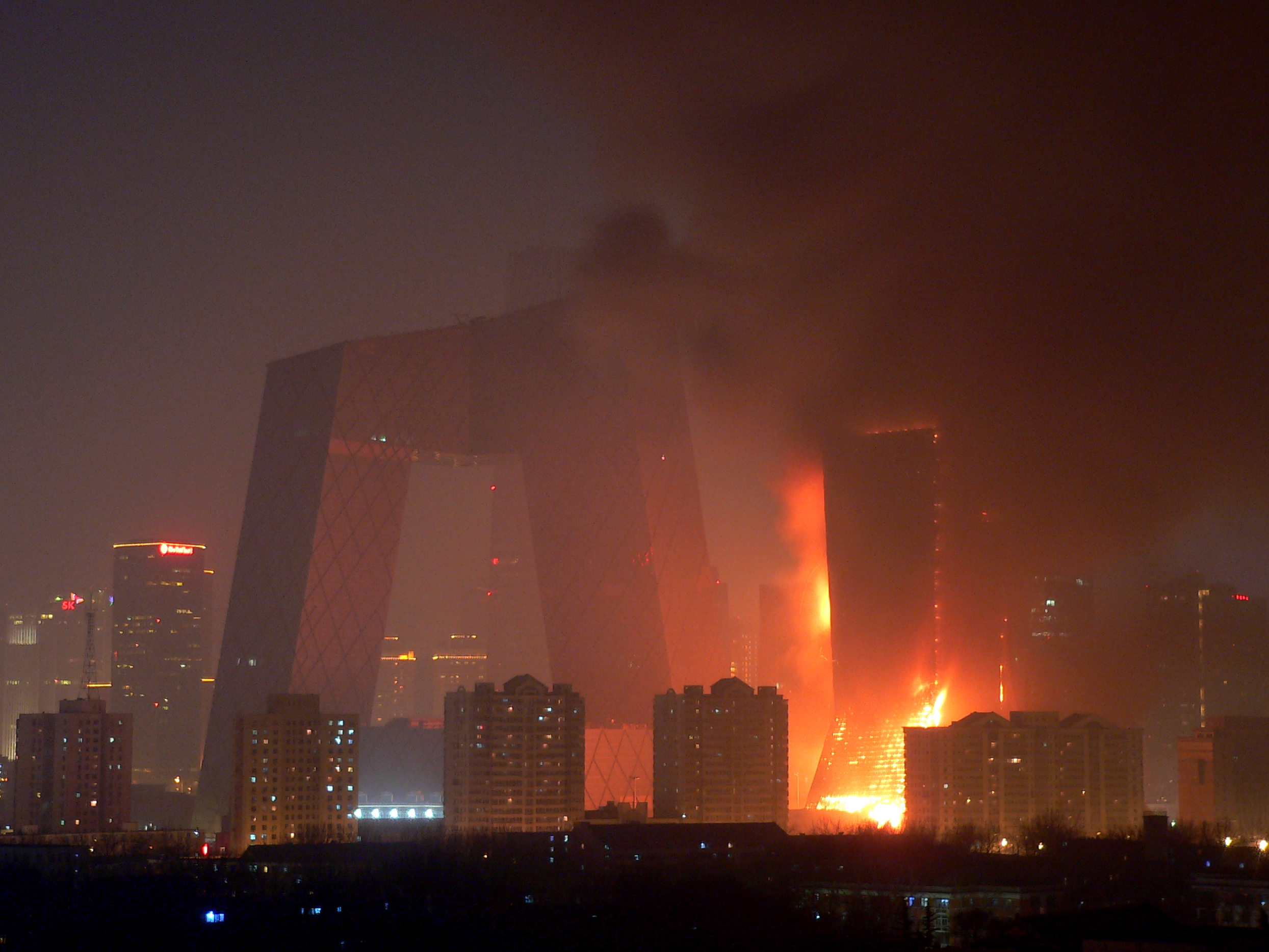
The TVCC building in flames

On February 2, 2009, the TVCC building caught fire due to a fireworks celebration by CCTV during the Lantern Festival, celebrating the New Year. The fire damaged the nearly complete building, delaying its opening until 2026.

== See also ==
- List of tallest buildings in Beijing

Media buildings in Beijing

- China Media Group Headquarters
- Central Radio & TV Tower
- CCTV Headquarters
- Beijing TV Centre
- Phoenix Center
