= Phoenix Center =

Phoenix Centre
- 凤凰国际传媒中心; Fènghuáng Guójī Chuánméi Zhōngxīn
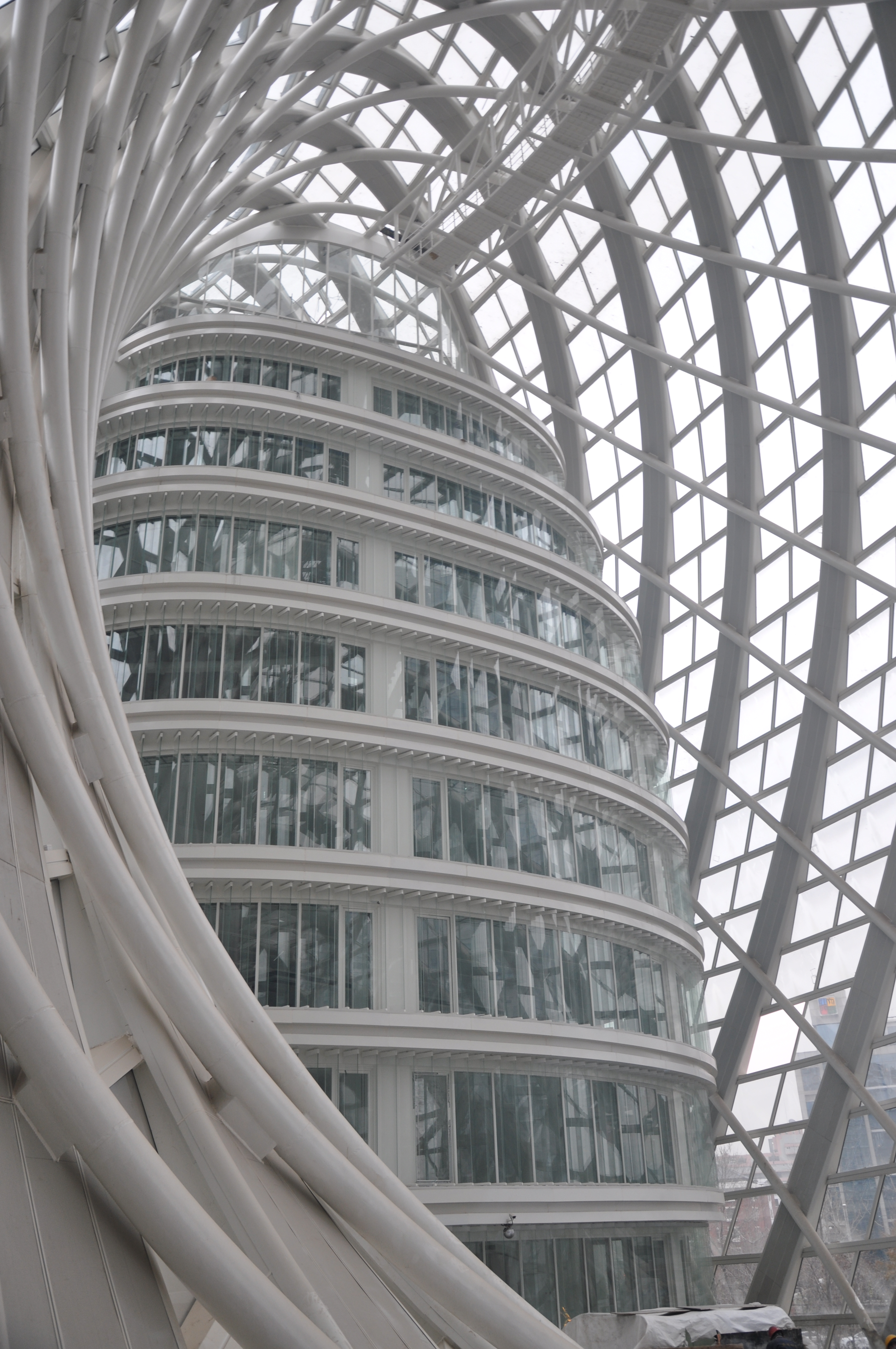
- The office building inside the Phoenix Center, Beijing, China. Taken in December 2011 when the building was still under construction.
- Interactive map of the Phoenix Centre area
- Alternative names: Phoenix International Media Centre.jpg

General information
- Status: Completed
- Location: Chaoyang District, Beijing, China, Nongzhanguan S Rd, Tuan Jie Hu, Chaoyang District, Beijing, China, 100018
- Coordinates: 39°56′04″N 116°28′16″E
- Construction started: 2008
- Completed: 2014
- Owner: Phoenix Satellite Television Holdings Ltd.

Height
- Height: 55 m

Technical details
- Floor count: 13
- Floor area: 72,478 square meters

Design and construction
- Architect: Shao Weiping
- Architecture firm: Beijing Institute of Architectural Design (BIAD)

The Phoenix International Media Centre (Chinese: 凤凰国际传媒中心; pinyin: Fènghuáng Guójī Chuánméi Zhōngxīn), also known as the Phoenix Centre (凤凰中心; Fènghuáng Zhōngxīn) is a building in Beijing, China. It is located in the southwestern corner of Chaoyang Park in Beijing. The centre features a torus-like design. The building's sculptural shape originates from the "Möbius strip" and establishes a harmonical relationship with the alignment of the turning road, the street corner, and Chaoyang Park.

== History ==
In 2007, Phoenix Television, a Hong Kong-based television network, proposed to build a media centre in Beijing. The building meant to represent not only the corporation spirit of Phoenix TV but also the profound cultural tradition of China. The centre was designed by the government-owned Beijing Institute of Architectural Design, with executive chief architect Shao Weiping. The enclosing of the final form involved 3,800 glass panels. Unlike the nearby CMG Headquarters, the building is open to the public.

== Design ==
According to Architect Shao Weiping, the design of the building resembles DNA-like double helix that has been wrapped into a loop. He adds that the circular contours of the Phoenix complex echo the yin-yang symbol of ancient Chinese philosophy. The Phoenix Centre is notable for being an experimental building designed by a domestic firm. Within the doughnut-shaped exterior "shell" are two conventionally-structured interior towers.

The contours were designed using parametric 3D modelling software. The software, including Frank Gehry's Digital Project modeling tools, enabled him to "intricately manipulate" the parameters of the overall design and structural engineering of the Phoenix Center, to precisely control the airflow around the building and to convert the facade's steel diagrid into a network of miniature canals to transport raindrops into an array of reflective pools surrounding the building. The structure features a parametrically designed atrium.

The building covers a land area of 18,000 m^{2}, with a construction floor area of 72,478 m^{2}.

The two independent office towers under the shell generate shared public space. In the east and west parts of the shared spaces, there are continuous steps, landscape platforms, and sky ramps. A dedicated visitors' pathway winds past the building's broadcasting studios and explorers may interact with reporters during the tour. The centre accommodates television production studios, offices and businesses.

== Awards ==
In 2017, the building won the Outstanding Structure Award, presented by the International Association for Bridge and Structural Engineering. The association stated that the "Phoenix Centre represents a complex spatial structure originated from 3D parametric design techniques resulting in an extraordinary interaction of architectural and structural aspects".

== Gallery ==
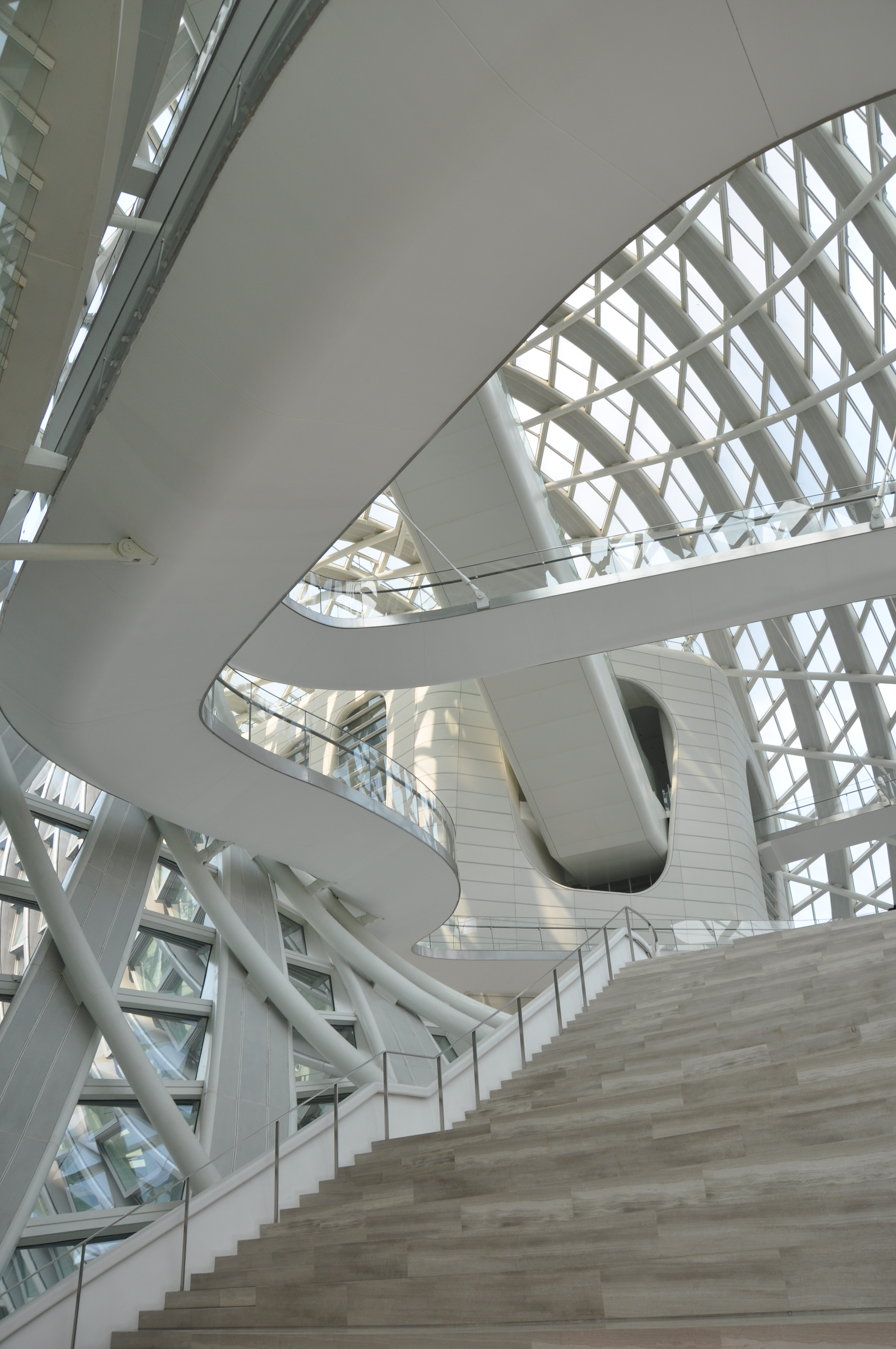
Image of the interior

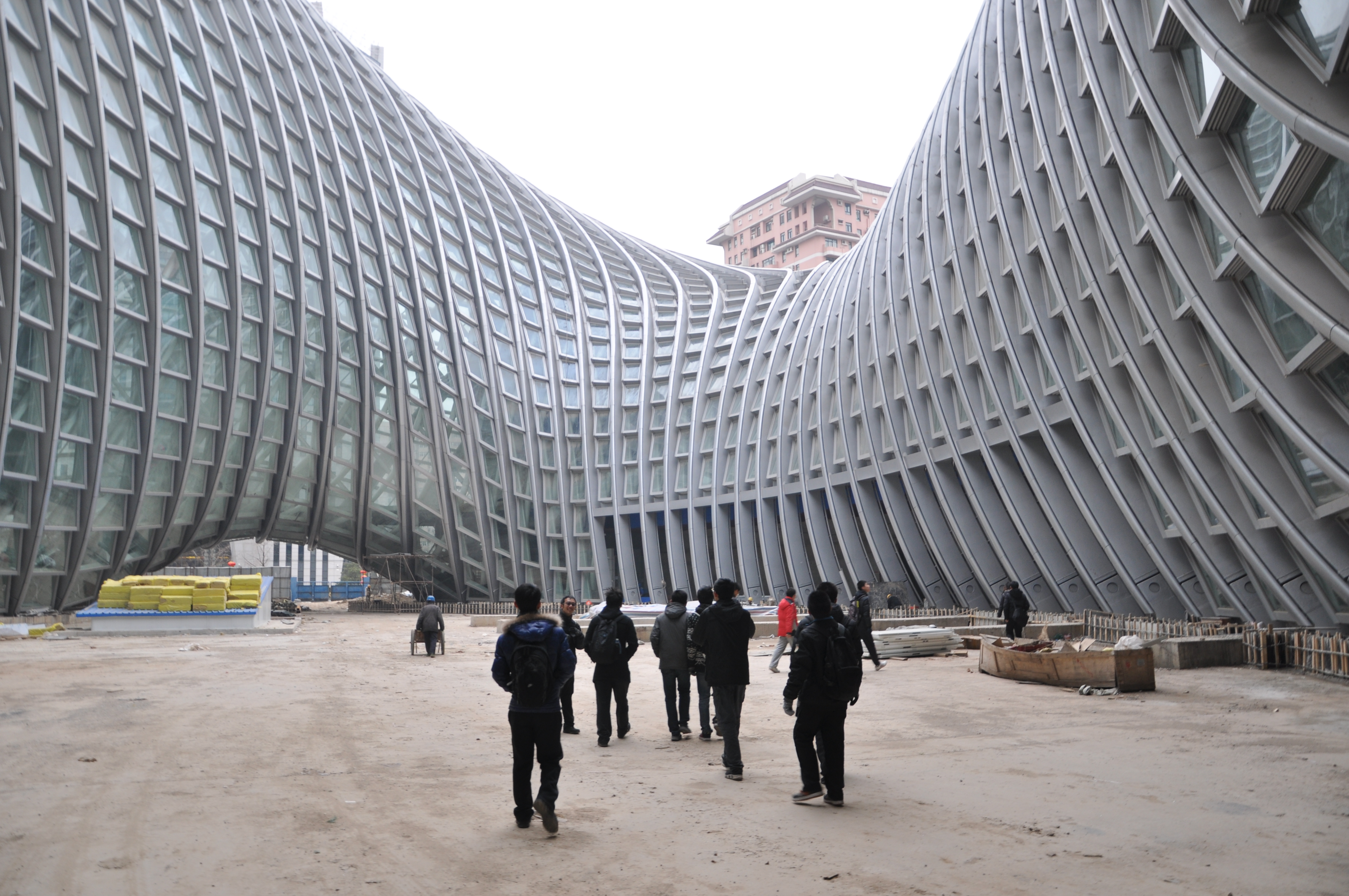
Empty space within the "torus", 2011

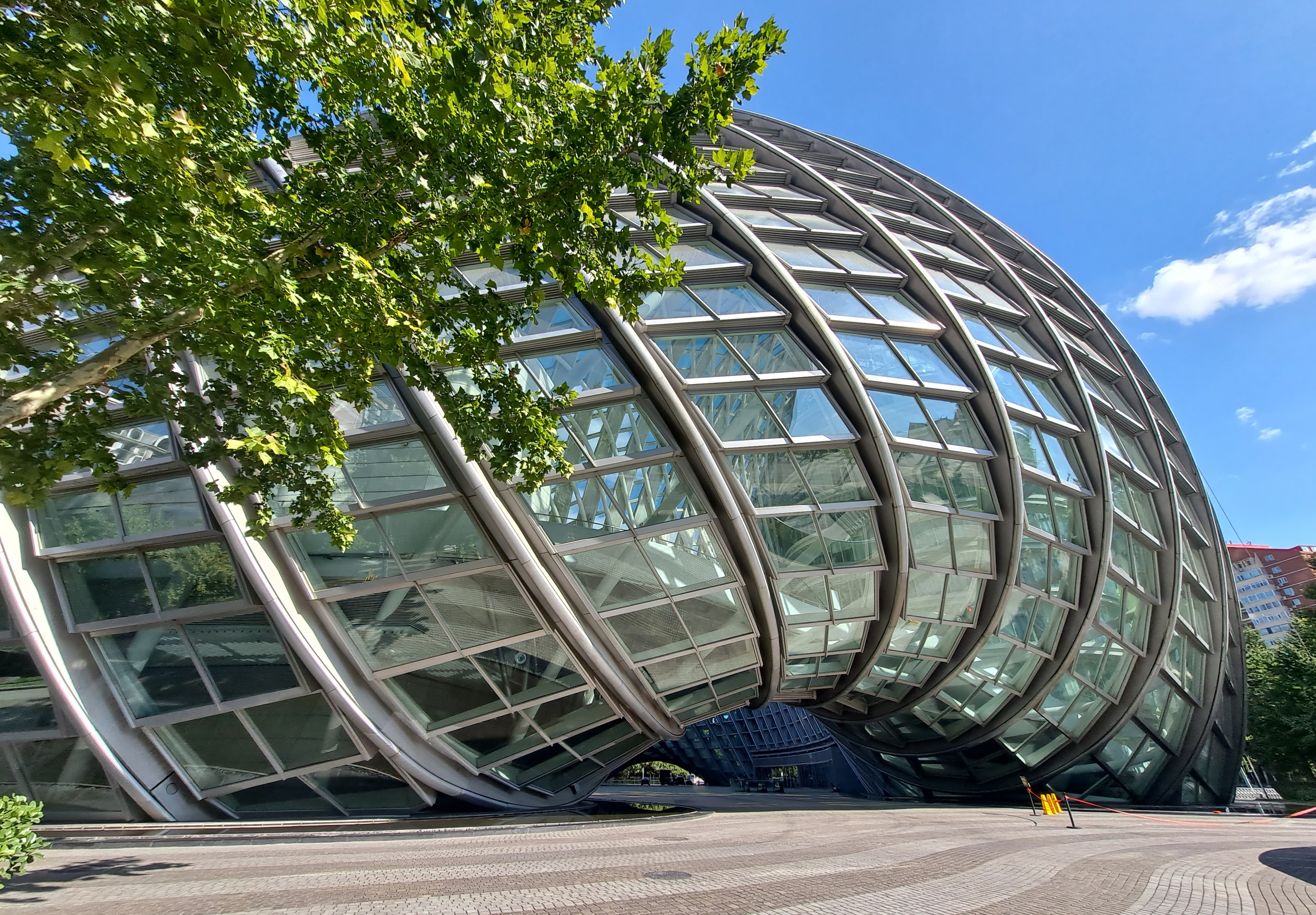
Phoenix Center, Beijing 2023

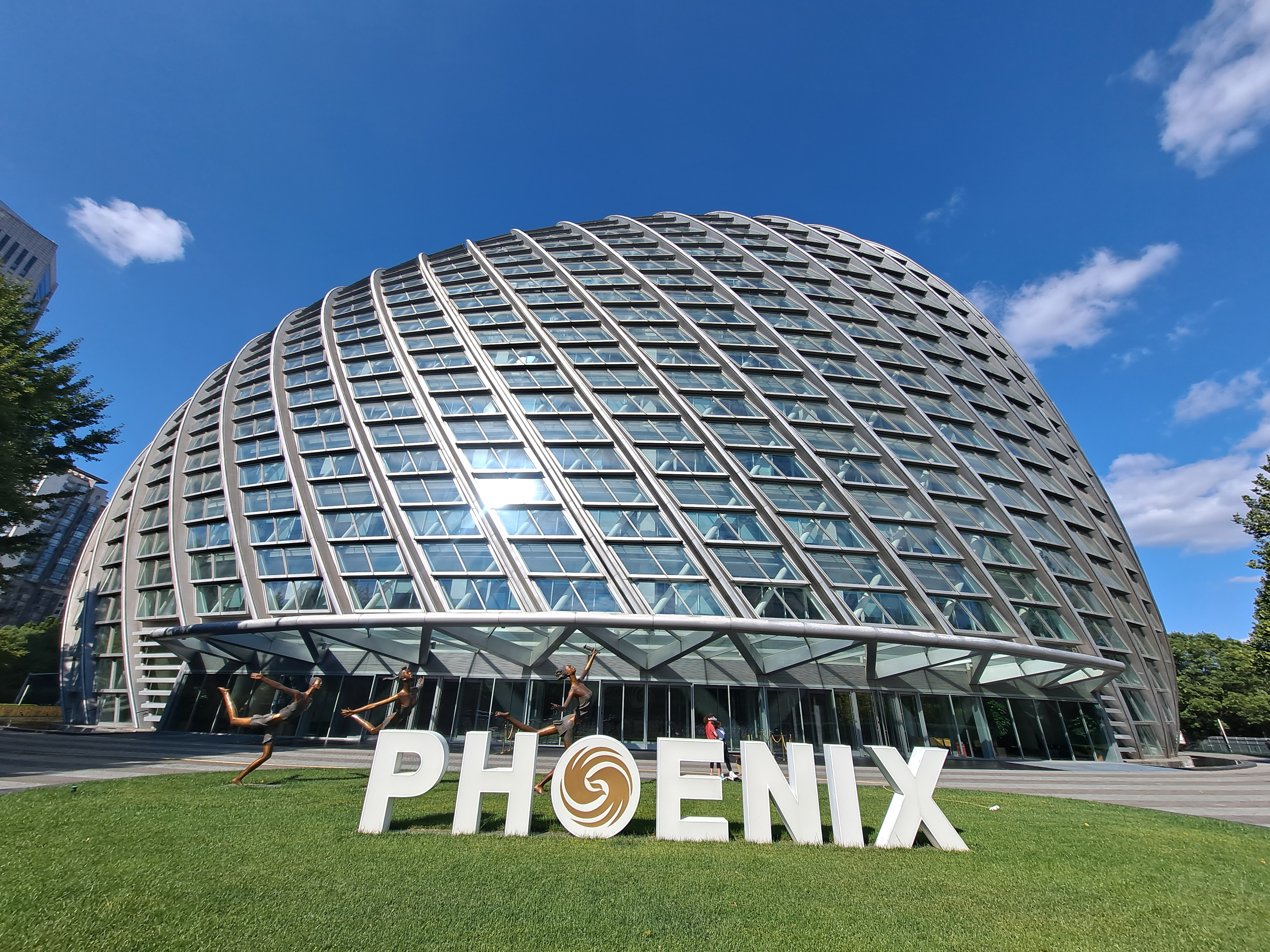
Phoenix Center, Beijing entrance

== See also ==
- List of tallest buildings in Beijing

Media buildings in Beijing

- China Media Group Headquarters
- Central Radio & TV Tower
- CCTV Headquarters
- Beijing Television Cultural Center
- Beijing TV Centre
