= CCTV Tower =

CCTV Tower may refer to either of two structures in Beijing:

- Central TV Tower, broadcasting tower finished 1992
- CCTV Headquarters, office block finished 2008
