= Beijing Olympic Tower =

Tourist observation tower opened in 2015

- 北京奥林匹克塔
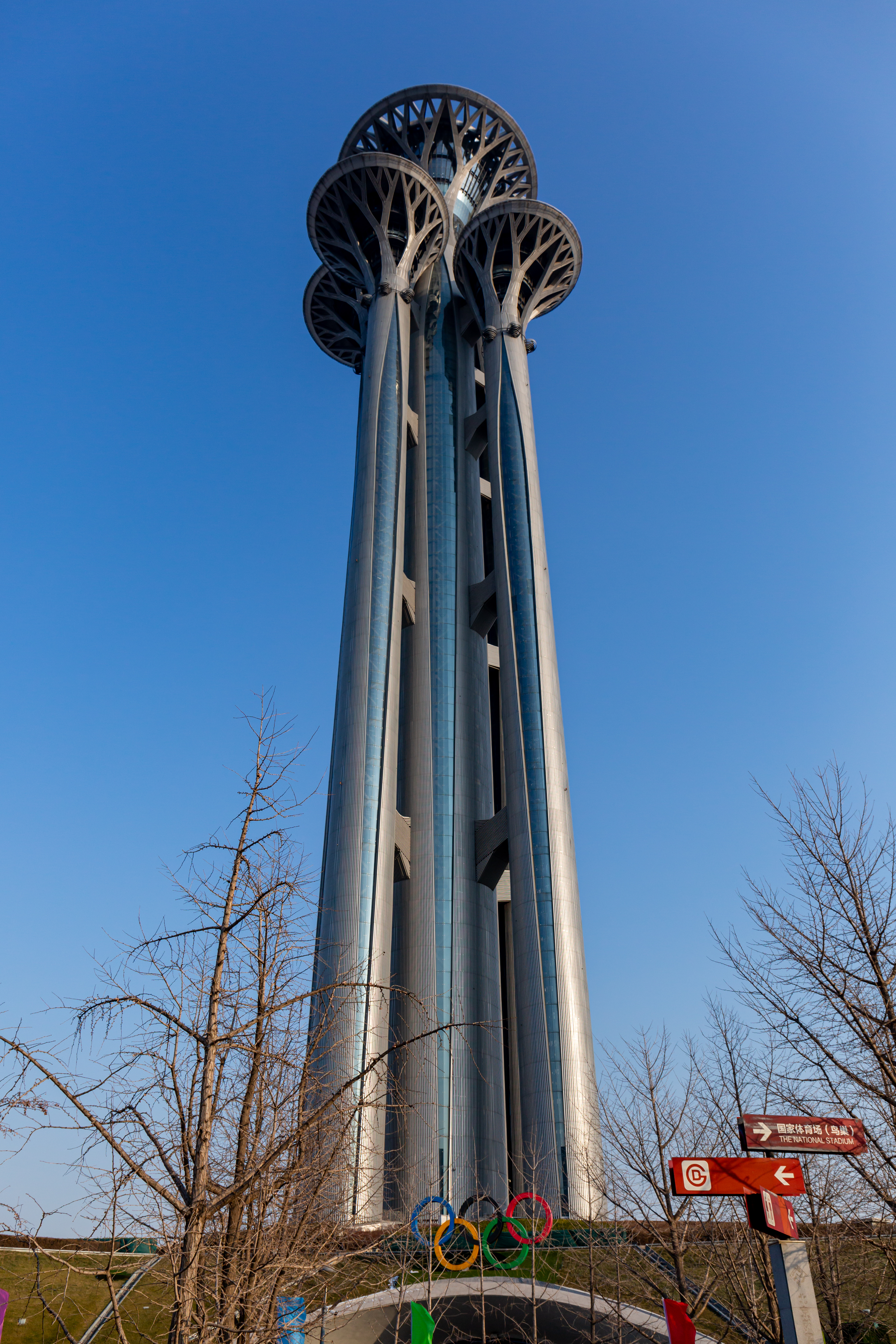
- Tower in January 2020
- Interactive map of the Beijing Olympic Tower area

General information
- Type: Observation tower
- Location: Kehui South Road, Olympic Green, Chaoyang District, Beijing, People's Republic of China
- Coordinates: 40.00651°N 116.38784°E
- Construction started: 2011
- Completed: 2014
- Opened: August 8, 2015
- Owner: Beijing Municipality

Height
- Architectural: 258 metres (846 ft)
- Top floor: 248 metres (814 ft)
- Observatory: 222 metres (728 ft), 228 metres (748 ft)

Technical details
- Material: Steel, concrete
- Lifts/elevators: 2
- Grounds: 7.5 hectares (19 acres)

Design and construction
- Architects: Cui Kai, Li Cundong and Zhao Wenbin
- Architecture firm: China Architecture Design & Research Group

The Beijing Olympic Tower (Chinese: 北京奥林匹克塔; pinyin: Běijīng Àolínpǐkè Tǎ) is located on Kehui South Road, part of the Olympic Green in the Chaoyang District of Beijing, China. Construction began in 2011, three years after the 2008 Summer Olympics; it was completed in 2014, and opened on August 8, 2015. It is used strictly for observation; there is no provision for offices or apartments. The design was by a Chinese firm, China Architecture Design & Research Group; a Shenzhen architect alleged that the architects at the firm had plagiarized an award-winning earlier design of his.

At 258 metres (846 ft) in height it is the second tallest tower in the city after the Central Radio & TV Tower, and the fourth-tallest structure in the city. Its design, with four smaller circular floors at different heights and positions below a larger top floor, is meant to echo the Olympic rings. The overall design was inspired by blades of grass; however it has also been likened to "huge nails".

== Structure ==
The tower sits on a 7.5-hectare (19-acre) landscaped parcel at the northeast corner of the intersection of Kehui South Road and Tianchen Road, a wide pedestrian promenade. The surrounding terrain is level, consisting mostly of urban open space such as planted parkland or open plazas. To the east is a long curving artificial waterbody that bounds the Olympic Green neighborhood in that direction; on the other side the first block is either more open space or large buildings such as the China Science and Technology Museum, after which denser urban development and taller buildings begin. On the west similar medium-rises begin after two large blocks.

One block to the north is the South Gate of Forest Park Station on Line 8 of the Beijing Subway. North of it is the 680-hectare (1,700-acre) Olympic Forest Park, a nature preserve that extends to the city's Fifth Ring Road. To the south, after another open block, are the former Olympic sport venues such as the China National Convention Center and Beijing National Stadium, known colloquially as the Birds' Nest. The south boundary of the Olympic Green, the Fourth Ring Road, is just beyond.

The five separate towers rest on an extensive concrete foundation with 30,000 square metres (320,000 sq ft) of exposed surface. A slight landscaped rise surrounds their base, from which all five circular steel towers rise. The largest and tallest, 258 metres (846 ft) in total height, is surrounded by the other four. The lesser towers reach different heights, with the lowest at 186 metres (610 ft).

Large diagonal members connect the lesser towers to the main structure. All the towers widen at their flat-roofed tops to allow the use of the space inside as observation platforms. The lesser tower tops spiral up to the main one. The solid steel exterior parts into latticework to allow views from the glass behind them. Two elevators, operating independently of each other, carry visitors up the central tower.

== History ==
A competition was held in the mid-2000s to select the design. The winning design was by Cui Kai and Li Cundong of the Chinese Architecture Design and Research Group (CARDEG). Zhao Wenbin, another architect at the firm, designed the landscaping at the towers' base.

Their design was inspired by blades of grass. The five circular tops of the towers are also meant to echo the Olympic rings, and provide space for observation decks and a revolving restaurant. As it neared completion, Internet commentators compared it to "five huge nails", as well.

Construction began in 2011, and was originally expected to finish the following year. As it was underway, Southern Metropolis Daily reported the complaints of a Shenzhen architect, Ping Caohan, that the CARDEG architects had essentially copied an earlier conceptual design of his for the tower. His design, which won the first round of the competition, consisted of five similar towers with observation pods, all in a ring at the top rather than at different levels. He did not enter his design in the second round, however, and the CARDEG architects said theirs was unrelated.

The tower was completed and opened in August 2014. It is the third tallest structure in Beijing after the Central Radio & TV Tower and the IAP Meteorological Tower and the fourth-tallest building in the city. It is also the sixth-tallest observation tower in China and the 22nd-tallest in the world. From the top, which includes a planned revolving restaurant, visitors can see the entire Olympic Green area as well as the Forbidden City and other sights of central Beijing to the south.

== See also ==
- List of tallest buildings in Beijing
- List of tallest towers in the world
