= China Zun =

Supertall skyscraper in Beijing, China

CITIC Tower
- 中国尊
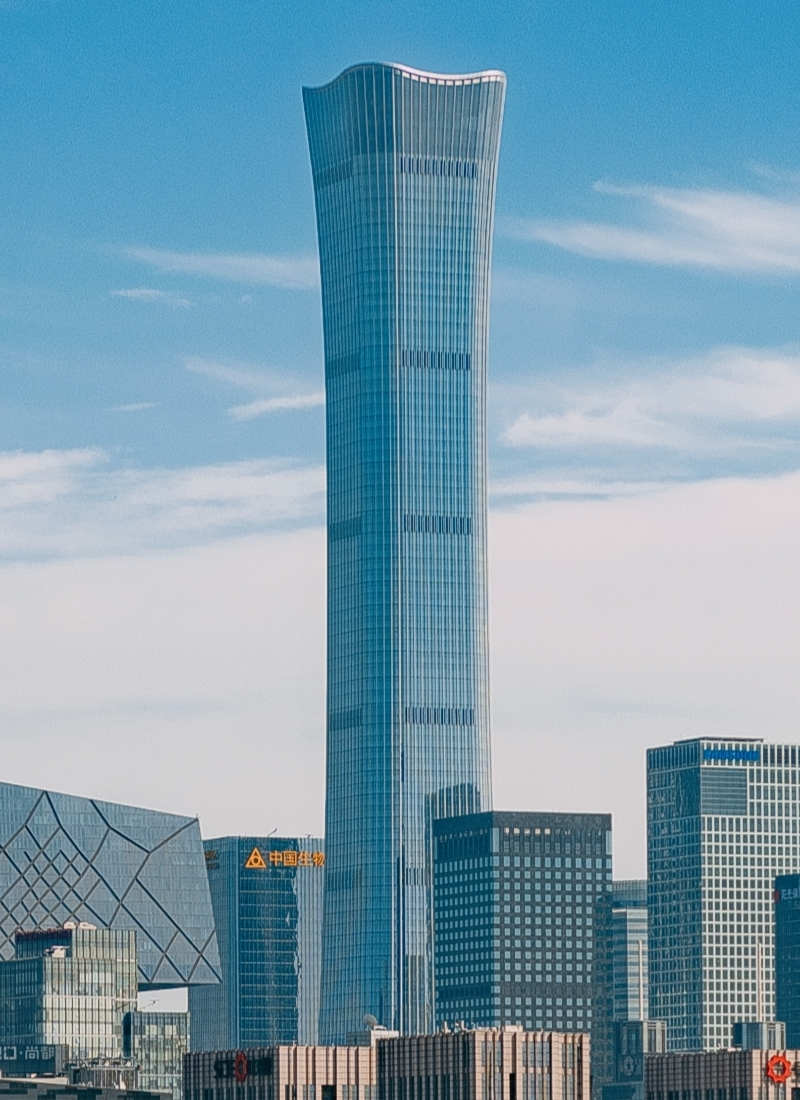
- The CITIC Tower in 2020
- Alternative names: China Zun, Zhongguo Zun

General information
- Status: Completed
- Architectural style: Modern
- Location: Z15 plot, Guanghua Road, Beijing CBD, Chaoyang District, Beijing, China
- Coordinates: 39°54′41″N 116°27′37″E
- Groundbreaking: 19 September 2011
- Construction started: 15 May 2012
- Completed: 30 September 2018

Height
- Height: 527.7 m (1,731 ft 4 in)
- Top floor: 522 m (1,712 ft 7 in)

Technical details
- Floor count: 109 (+8 below ground)
- Floor area: 427,000 m^{2} (4,600,000 ft^{2})

Design and construction
- Architects: TFP Farrells (Land Bid Concept); Kohn Pedersen Fox (Concept & Design); BIAD (Land Bid Concept & Architect of Record)
- Developer: CITIC Real Estate
- Structural engineer: Arup

China Zun
- Simplified Chinese: 中国尊
- Traditional Chinese: 中國尊
Transcriptions
Standard Mandarin
- Hanyu Pinyin: Zhōngguó Zūn
- IPA: [ʈʂʊ́ŋ.kwǒ tswə́n]

CITIC Tower
- Simplified Chinese: 中信集团总部大楼
- Traditional Chinese: 中信集團總部大樓
Transcriptions
Standard Mandarin
- Hanyu Pinyin: Zhōngxìn Jítuán Zǒngbù Dàlóu

CITIC Tower, also known as China Zun, (Note: Chinese: 中国尊; pinyin: Zhōngguó Zūn [ʈʂʊ́ŋ.kwǒ.tswə́n]) is a supertall skyscraper in the Central Business District of Beijing, China. The 109-story, 528-metre (1,732 ft) building constructed by China Construction Third Engineering Bureau is the tallest in the city, surpassing the China World Trade Center Tower III by 190 metres (620 ft) on 18 August 2016. The tower structurally topped out on 9 July 2017, fully topped out on 18 August 2017, and was completed in late 2018, making CITIC Tower the tallest completed building of 2018. As of 2024, it is the tallest building with a rooftop helipad in the world.

== History ==
The nickname "China Zun" comes from the zun, an ancient Chinese wine vessel which inspired the building design, according to the developers, the CITIC Group. The groundbreaking ceremony of the building took place in Beijing on 19 September 2011, and the constructors expected to finish the project within five years. CITIC Tower is Northern China's third-tallest building after Goldin Finance 117 and Chow Tai Fook Binhai Center in Tianjin.

Farrells produced the tower's land bid concept design, with Kohn Pedersen Fox assuming the project and completing a 14-month-long concept design process after the client had won the bid.

China Zun is a mixed-use building, featuring 60 floors of office space, 20 floors of luxury apartments and 20 floors of hotel with 300 rooms. There will be a rooftop garden on the top floor at 522 m (1,713 ft) high.

The tower is likely to remain the tallest building in Beijing for the foreseeable future, as in 2018 authorities capped new projects in the central business district to a height of no more than 180 m (590 ft) in a bid to reduce congestion.

=== 2018 observatory controversy ===
In April 2018, Hong Kong newspaper Ming Pao reported that China Zun's top three floors, Levels 106–107 and an observatory on level 108, was to be expropriated by the national-security apparatus, since the entire Zhongnanhai complex, the headquarters of the Central Committee of the Chinese Communist Party and the State Council of the People's Republic of China, could be seen from the top of the skyscraper with the naked eye on a clear day. It is also said that with high-end telescopes and other monitoring equipment, the day-to-day lives and activities of the Party and State Leaders could be seen. The building was ordered to be rectified for "fire safety issues" by the authorities, but the CITIC Group was unable to reveal the specific reason for rectification. It is also said the top three floors of the building will be administered by the National Security authorities after rectification.

=== 2026 plane crash ===
On 26 June 2026, a Sunward SA 60L Aurora aircraft owned by a local general aviation company, registry B-12PP, crashed into the upper floors of the building. According to flight data from Flightradar24, it entered highly restricted Beijing airspace (5th Ring Road) and was nearing Zhongnanhai, the central leadership compound which is a complete no-fly zone, on "a severely deviated flight path" when the aircraft transponder stopped transmitting, and it made further turns toward the skyscraper. The pilot of the plane and only person on board—identified as 66-year-old Beijing resident Liu Junhua—died, and 13 people inside the building or on the ground were injured. The building only sustained minor damage.

Videos taken shortly after the crash show fires and smoke burning on a lower extended part of the building, likely ignited by falling debris, which were extinguished shortly after. Bystanders were told by authorities not to film the scene, and news and videos posted to Chinese social media platforms were promptly censored, with posts on apps like Douyin, Xiaohongshu, WeChat and Weibo regarding the incident quickly being taken down. Due to the censorship, few Chinese are believed to have heard of the incident.

Beijing's Chaoyang district government said Liu had deviated from his approved flight area and lost contact with air traffic control. It added that Liu had insomnia and anxiety and the crash was caused by unspecified "personal reasons".

== Gallery ==
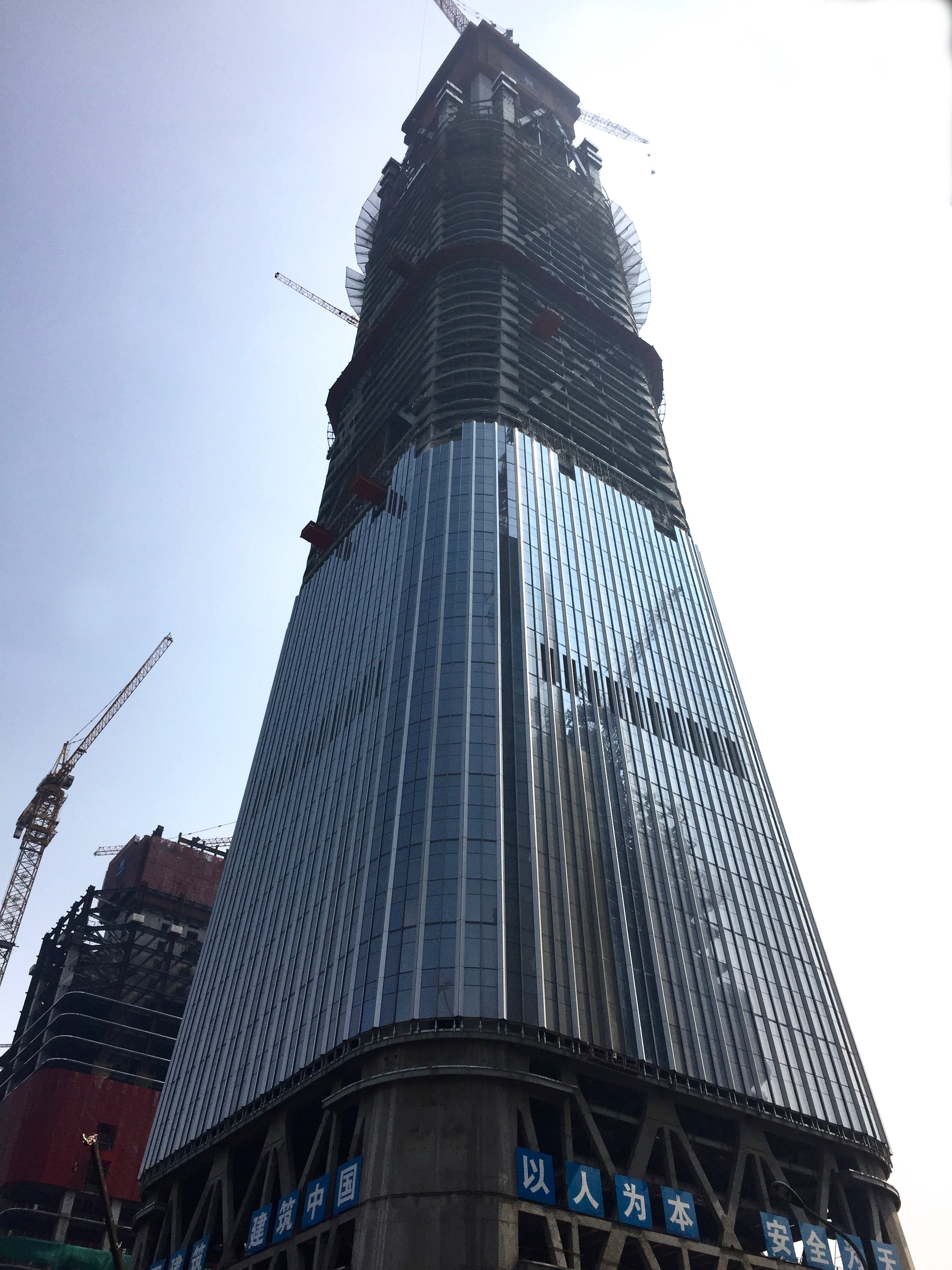
CITIC Tower under construction in 2016.

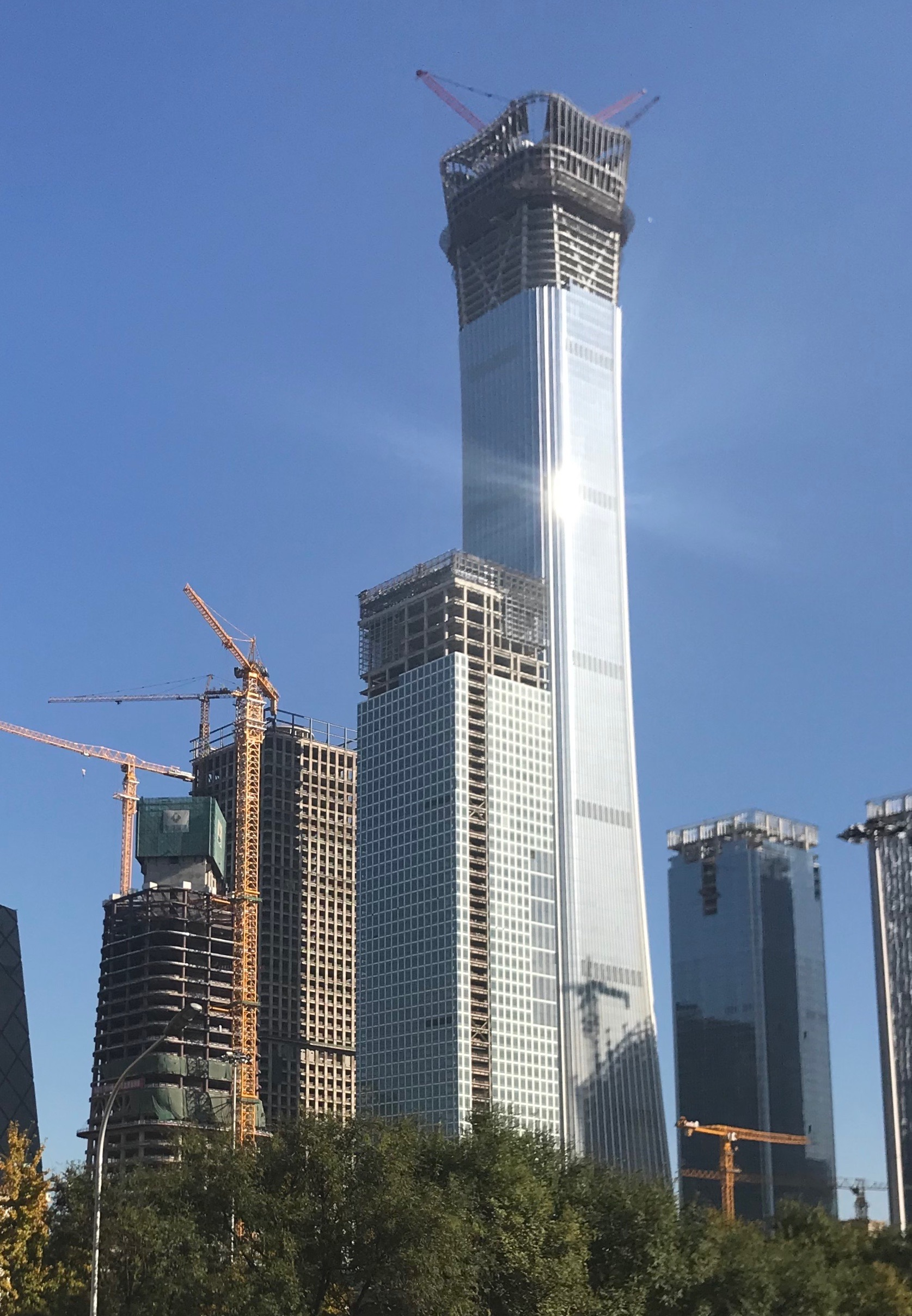
China Zun skyscraper under construction in November 2017.

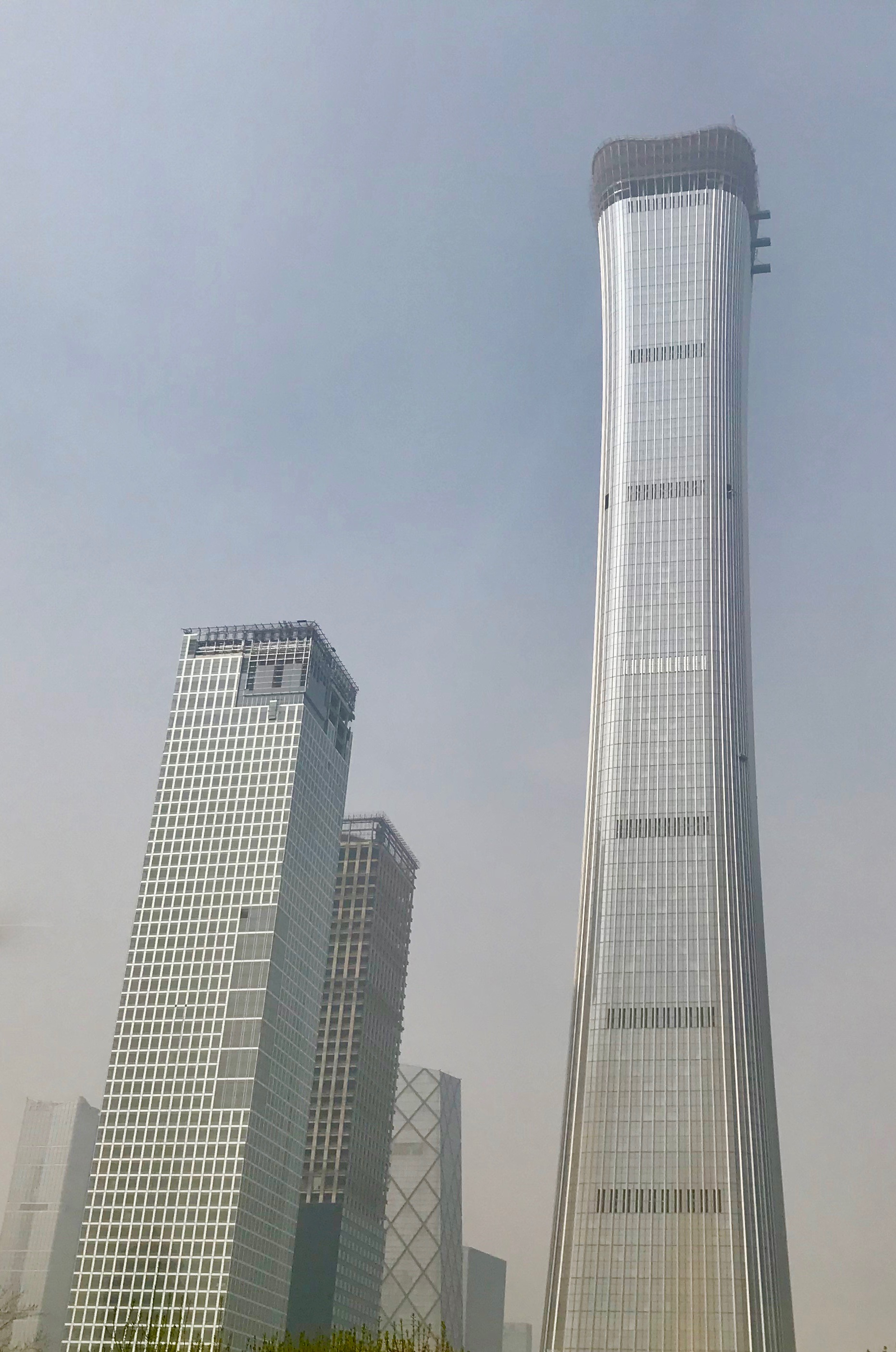
China Zun skyscraper (right) under construction in April 2018.

== Division of floors ==
The building has a total of seven office areas. Among them, Areas 1–3, Area 5 and Area 7 are occupied by China CITIC Bank, Alibaba and CITIC Group respectively, the main tenants of China Zun; the remaining office areas are leased to Fortune Global 500 enterprises and financial institutions, including China Construction Bank.

Floor	Function
108–R2	Mechanical
105–107	Observation deck
103–104	Mechanical, fire safety area
89–102	Office area #7 (China CITIC Group headquarters)
87–88	Mechanical, fire safety area
75–86	Office area #6
73–74	Mechanical, fire safety area
59–72	Office area #5 (Alibaba Group and its subordinate Ant Group)
57–58	Mechanical, fire safety area
45–56	Office area #4
43–44	Mechanical, fire safety area
31–42	Office area #3 (CITIC Bank head office)
29–30	Mechanical, fire safety area
19–28	Office area #2 (CITIC Bank head office)
17–18	Mechanical, fire safety area
7–16	Office area #1 (CITIC Bank head office)
5–6	Mechanical, fire safety area, air-conditioning center
3–4	Conference center
1–2	Entrance lobby
B1	Shopping mall (CITIC Publishing Group's flagship store is located in this mall)
B2–B7	Parking lot
B8	Mechanical

== See also ==
- List of tallest buildings
- List of buildings with 100 floors or more
- List of tallest buildings in Beijing
