= Fortune Plaza =

- Interactive map of the Fortune Plaza area

General information
- Type: Office, Residential, Hotel
- Location: 7 Dongsanhuan Zhong Road, Chaoyang District, Beijing, China
- Coordinates: 39°54′59.2″N 116°27′7.2″E
- Construction started: 2000
- Completed: 2013

Height
- Roof: Phase 1: 150 m (490 ft); Phase 3: 267 m (876 ft)

Technical details
- Floor count: Phase 1: 34; Phase 2: 60
- Floor area: 720,000 m^{2} (7,800,000 ft^{2})

Design and construction
- Architects: Aedas for Fortune Plaza 1; Wong & Tung International Ltd for Fortune Heights; P&T Architects & Engineers Ltd for Fortune Financial Center

Fortune Plaza is a mixed-use development in the central business district of Chaoyang District, Beijing, near Kerry Center, the China World Trade Center and the CCTV Headquarters building. It has a total construction area of 720,000 square metres (7,800,000 sq ft), covering 92,100 square metres (991,000 sq ft) of land.

It contains Fortune Plaza 1 (2006) as phase 1 and Fortune Heights (2008) as phase 2 and Fortune Financial Center (2014) as phase 3.

== Gallery ==
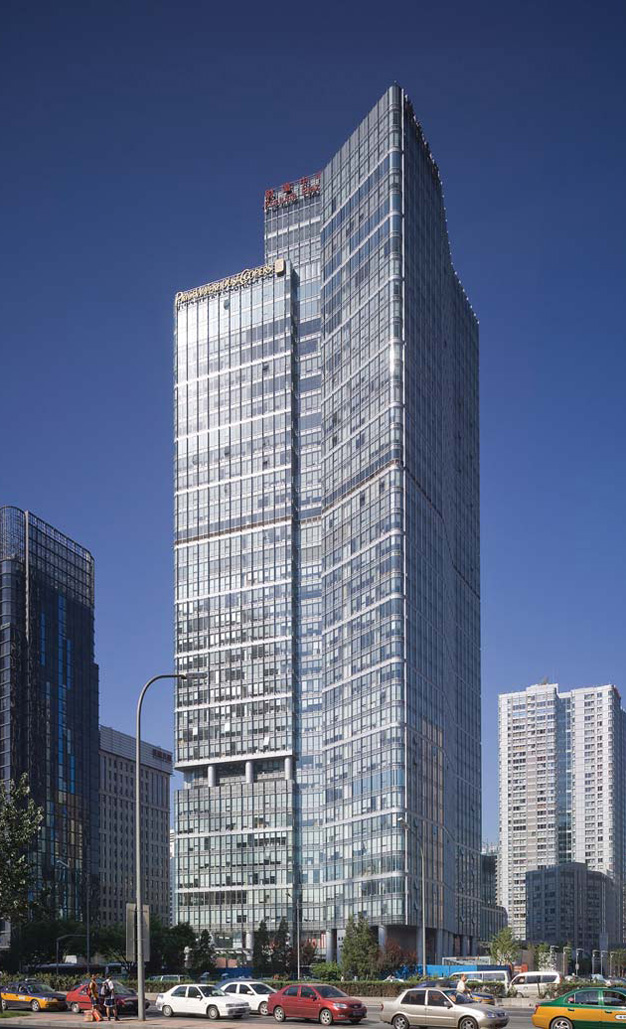
Fortune Plaza 1, Beijing

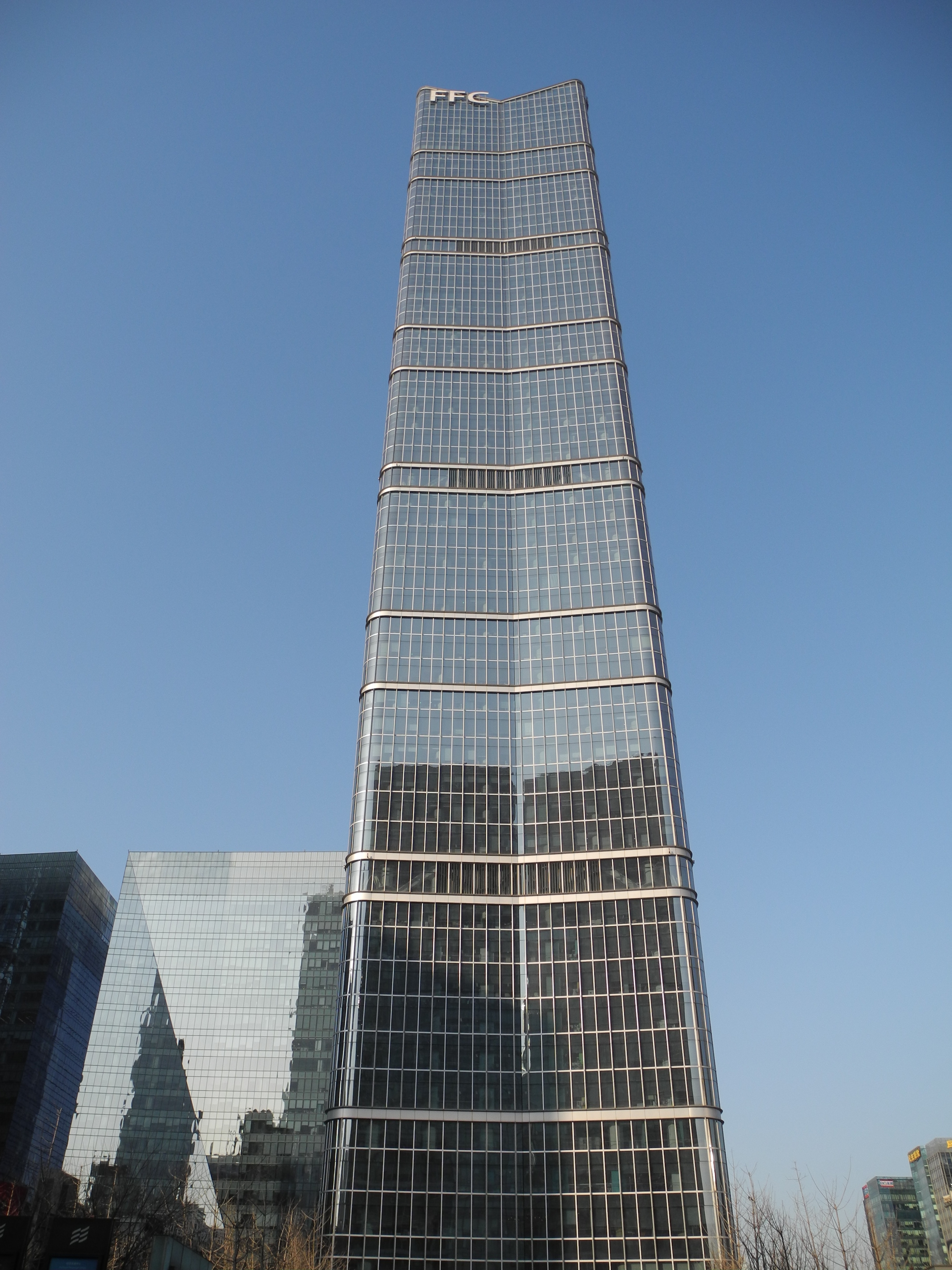
Fortune Financial Center, Beijing

== See also ==
- List of tallest buildings in the world
- List of tallest buildings in Beijing
