= Beijing TV Centre =

Beijing TV Center
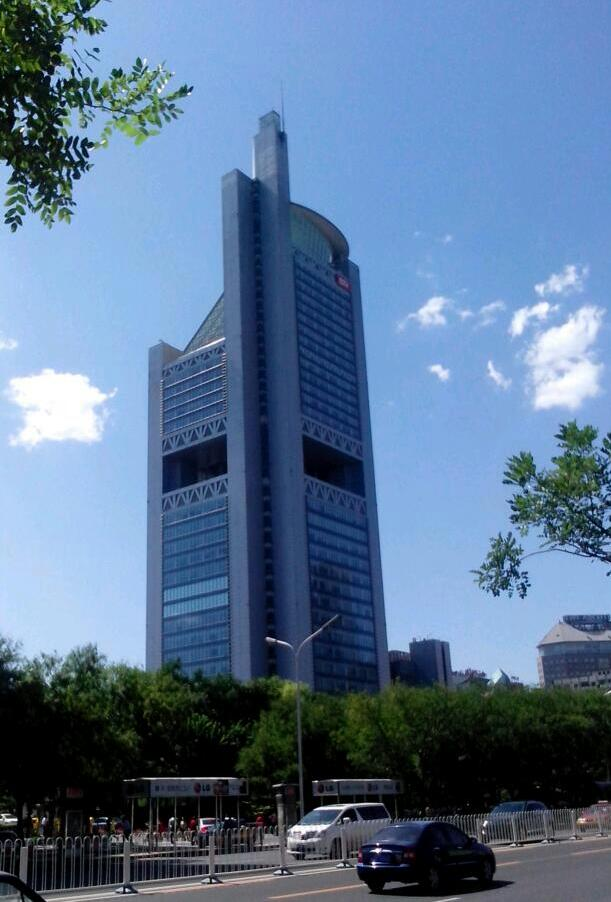

General information
- Location: Beijing, China
- Coordinates: 39°54′19.5″N 116°27′43.3″E
- Completed: 2006

Height
- Antenna spire: 239 m (784 ft)

Technical details
- Floor count: 41

The Beijing TV Center (simplified Chinese: 北京电视中心; traditional Chinese: 北京電視中心; pinyin: Běijīng Diànshì Zhōngxīn) is a 41-floor, 239-meter (784 ft)-tall skyscraper completed in 2006 located in Beijing, China. It was designed by Japanese company Nikken Sekkei. The building is home to the Beijing Radio and Television Station.

== See also ==
- List of tallest buildings in Beijing

Media buildings in Beijing

- China Media Group Headquarters
- Central Radio & TV Tower
- CCTV Headquarters
- Beijing Television Cultural Center
- Phoenix Center
