= Central Radio & TV Tower =

Telecommunications and observation tower in Beijing, China

- 中央广播电视塔
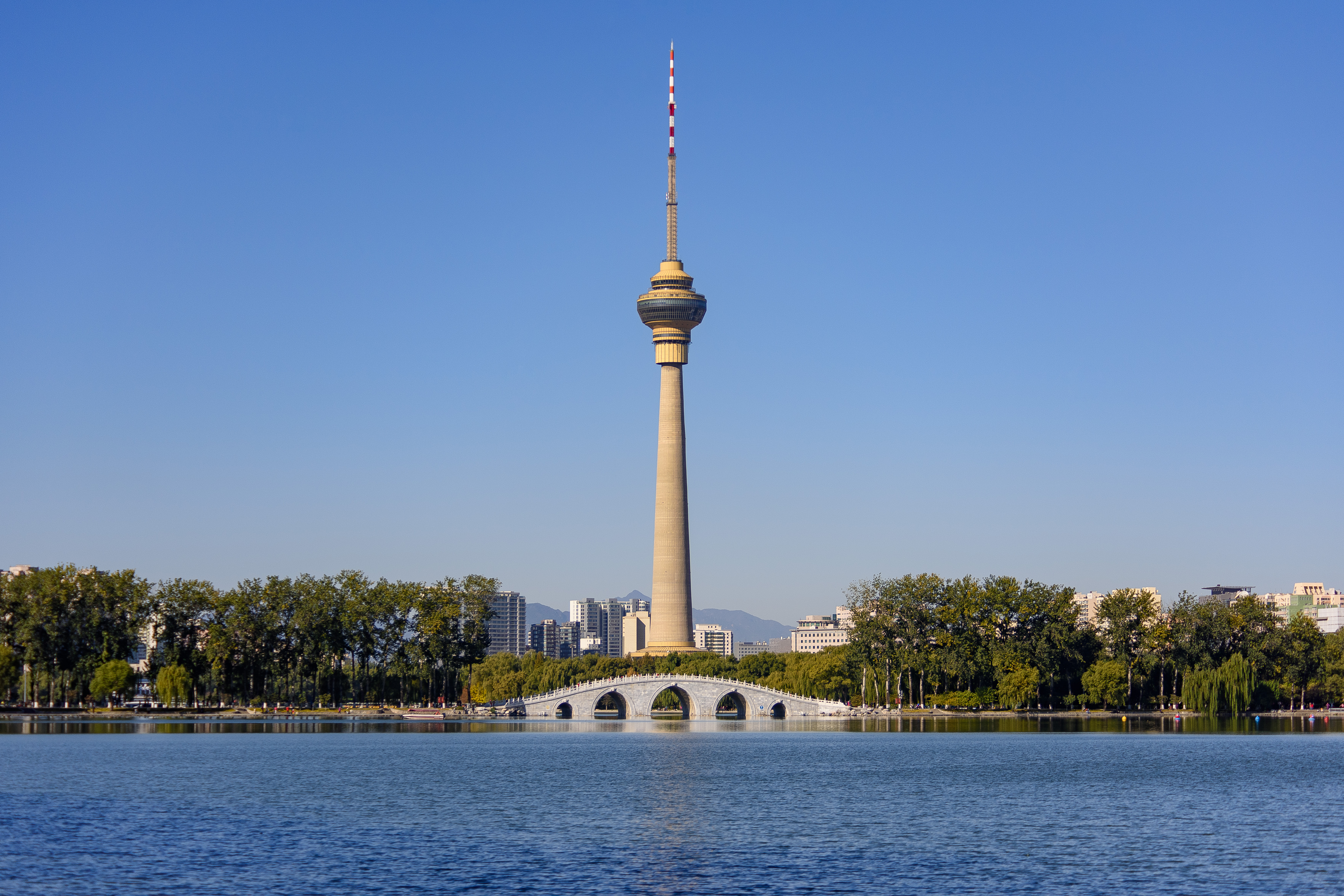
- The Central Radio & TV Tower as taken from Yuyuantan Park in 2021
- Former names: CCTV Tower; Beijing TV Tower

General information
- Status: Completed
- Type: Telecommunications
- Architectural style: Modernism
- Location: 11 Xisanhuan Street; Haidian District, Beijing, China
- Coordinates: 39.91806°N 116.30028°E
- Construction started: 1987
- Completed: 1992

Height
- Antenna spire: 405 m (1,329 ft)
- Top floor: 248 m (814 ft)

Technical details
- Floor area: 60,000 m^{2} (650,000 sq ft)

Design and construction
- Architects: Design Institute of the Ministry of Radio, Film and Television
- Engineer: KCA Architects Snoeren

The Central Radio & TV Tower (simplified Chinese: 中央广播电视塔; traditional Chinese: 中央廣播電視塔; pinyin: Zhōngyāng guǎngbò diànshì tǎ; Mandarin pronunciation: [ʈʂʊ́ŋ.jáŋ.kwàŋ.pwó.tjɛ̂n.ʂɻ̩̂.tʰà]) is a 405-metre-tall (1,329 ft) telecommunications- and observation tower in Beijing, China. It was the tallest structure in the city until 2018, when it was surpassed by China Zun. It is the ninth-tallest tower in the world, and has its observation deck at 238 m (781 ft). The tower provides panoramic views over the city from its revolving restaurant and observation deck. It is a member of the World Federation of Great Towers.

== History ==
The tower was completed in 1992, designed by Paulus Snoeren in the late 1980s and contains broadcasting equipment for China Central Television. It is located in Beijing's Haidian District, near to the Gongzhufen metro station and Yuyuantan Park. The CCTV Headquarters is now based in Chaoyang District, designed by Rem Koolhaas in late 2009.

A race to the top of the tower is held annually with two laps of the base followed by a climb of the 1,484 steps leading up to the observation deck.

On May 10, 2004, the Central Radio and Television Tower adjusted the microwave signals of publicly transmitted China Central Television (CCTV) programs, with the signals of the Sports Channel and the Variety Channel being replaced by the Music Channel and the Children's Channel.

== Floors ==
There are 4 floors opened to the public.

=== Floor 1 ===
Lounge, toilets, lift to level 216 (level 4 for guest) and stairs to level 2.

=== Floor 2 ===
History of very famous people in China, lift to level 186 (Level 3 for guest), lift to level 216 (level 4 for guest) and stairs to level 1.

=== Floor 3 ===
How CCTV (Chinese TV programme) work, lift to level 2 lift to level 216 (level 4 for guest).

=== Floor 4 ===
Viewing area, lift to level 183 (level 3 for guest).

== Gallery ==
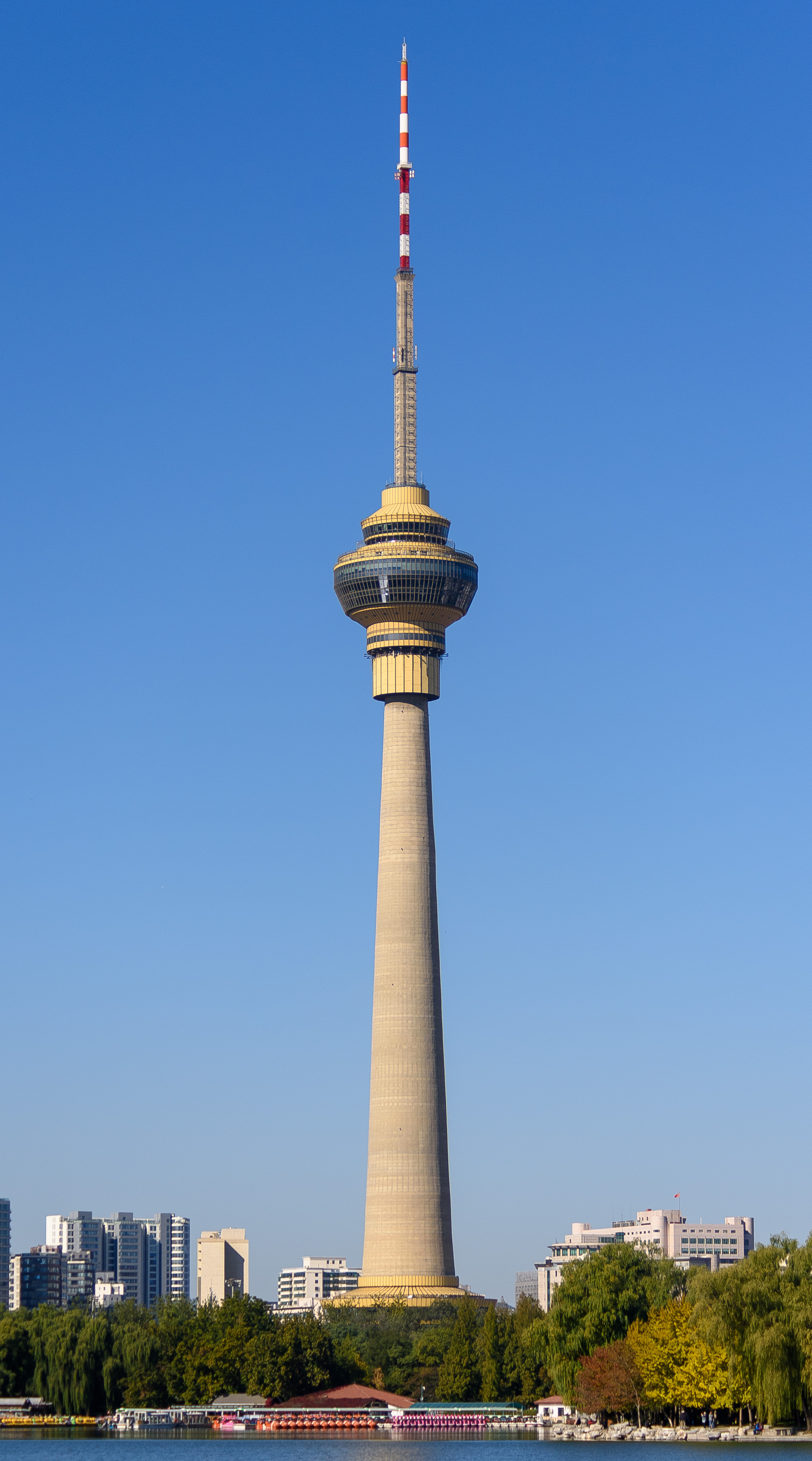

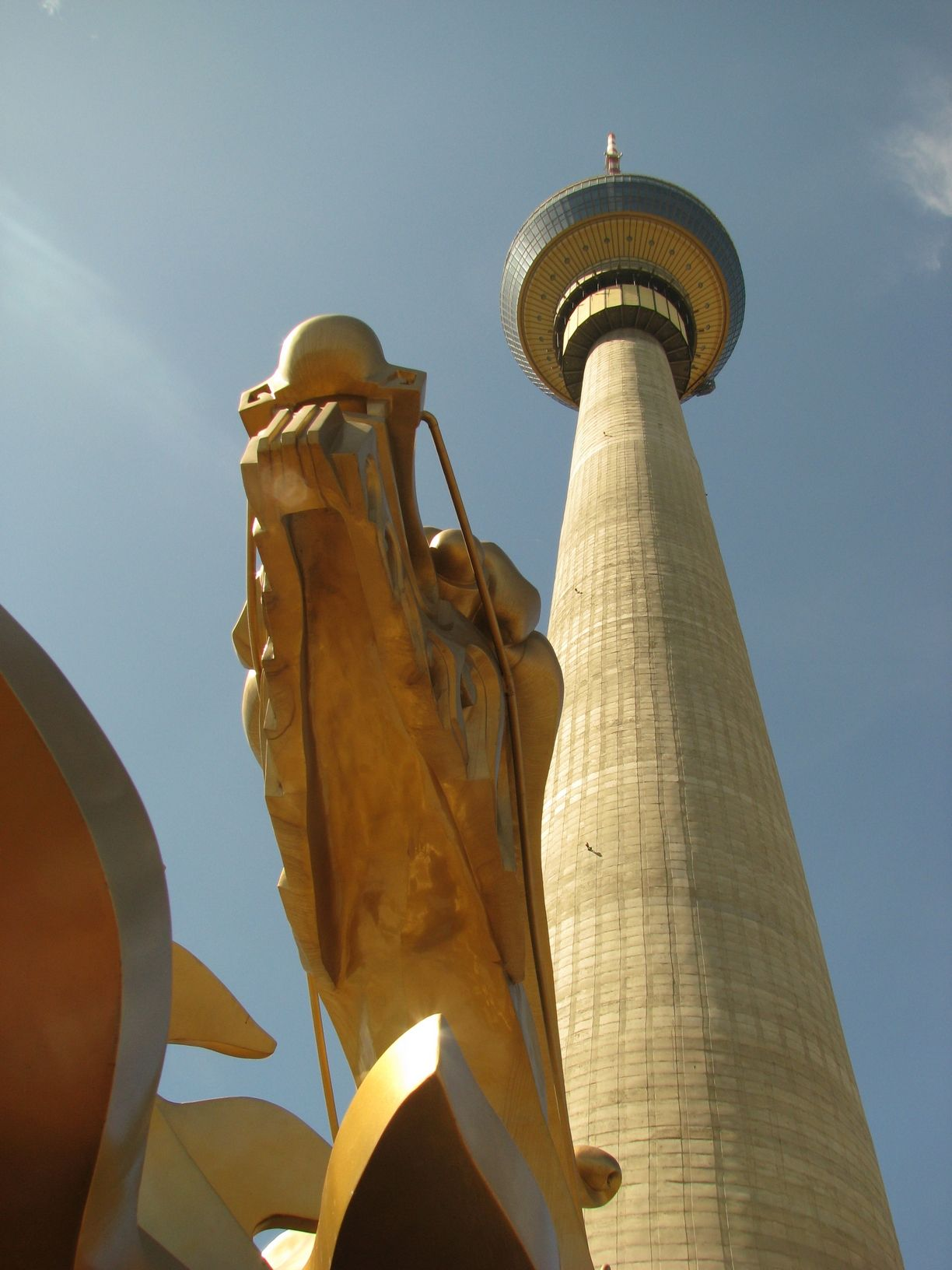

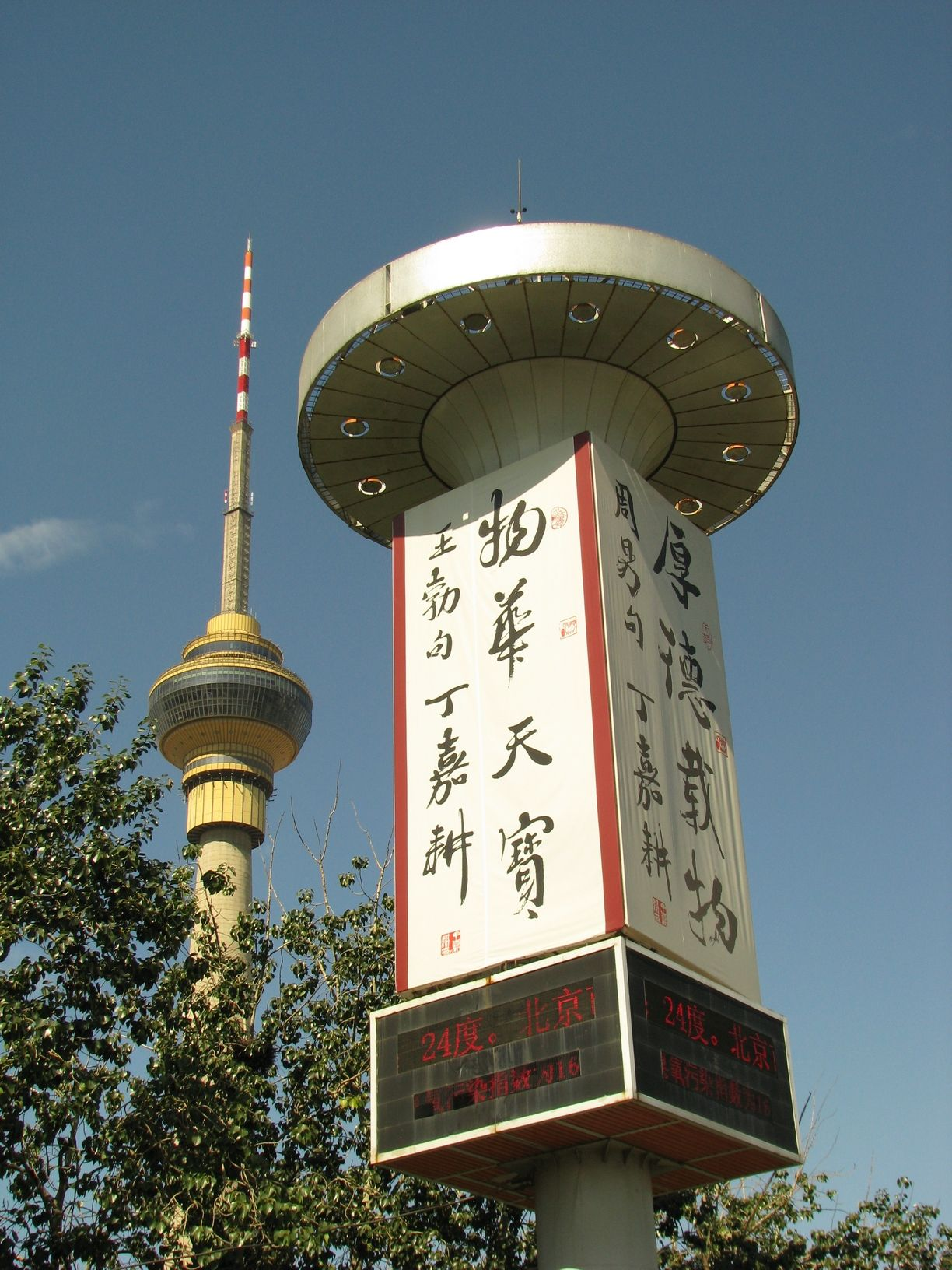

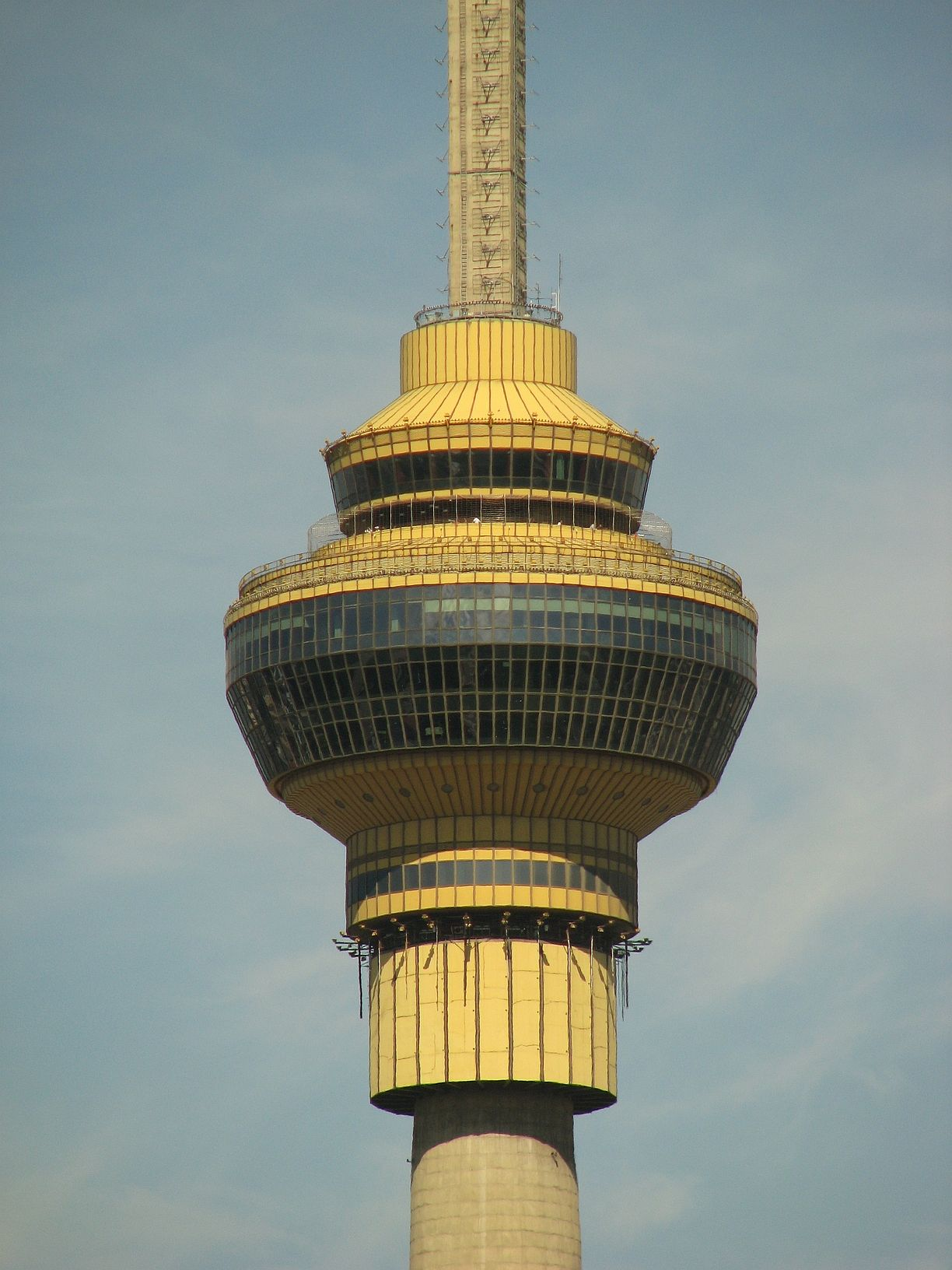

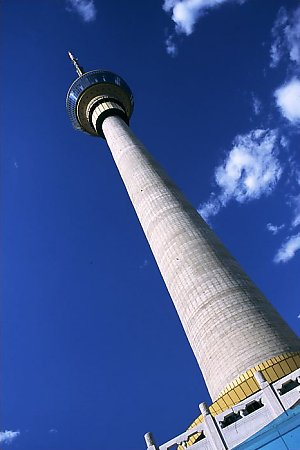

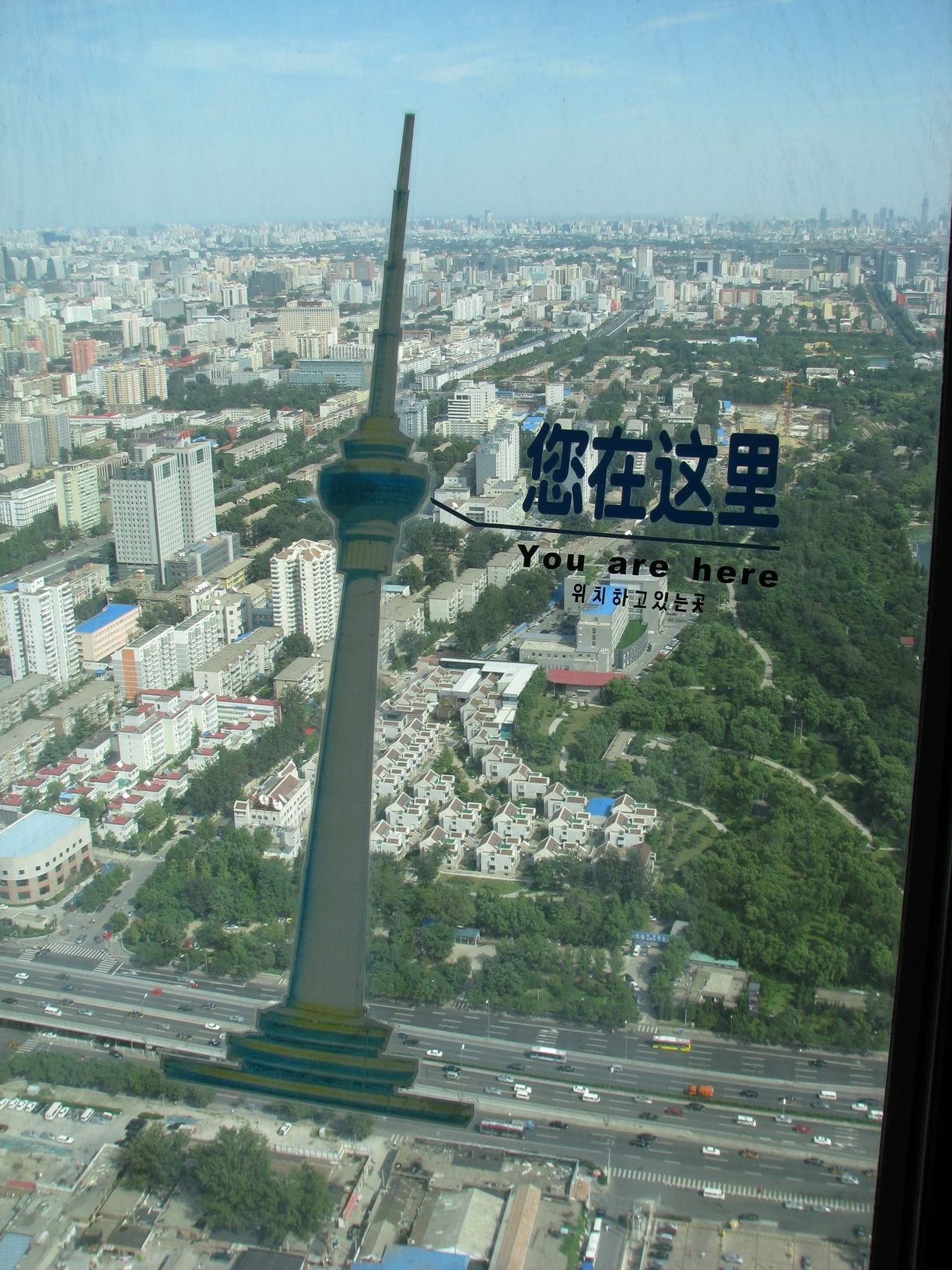

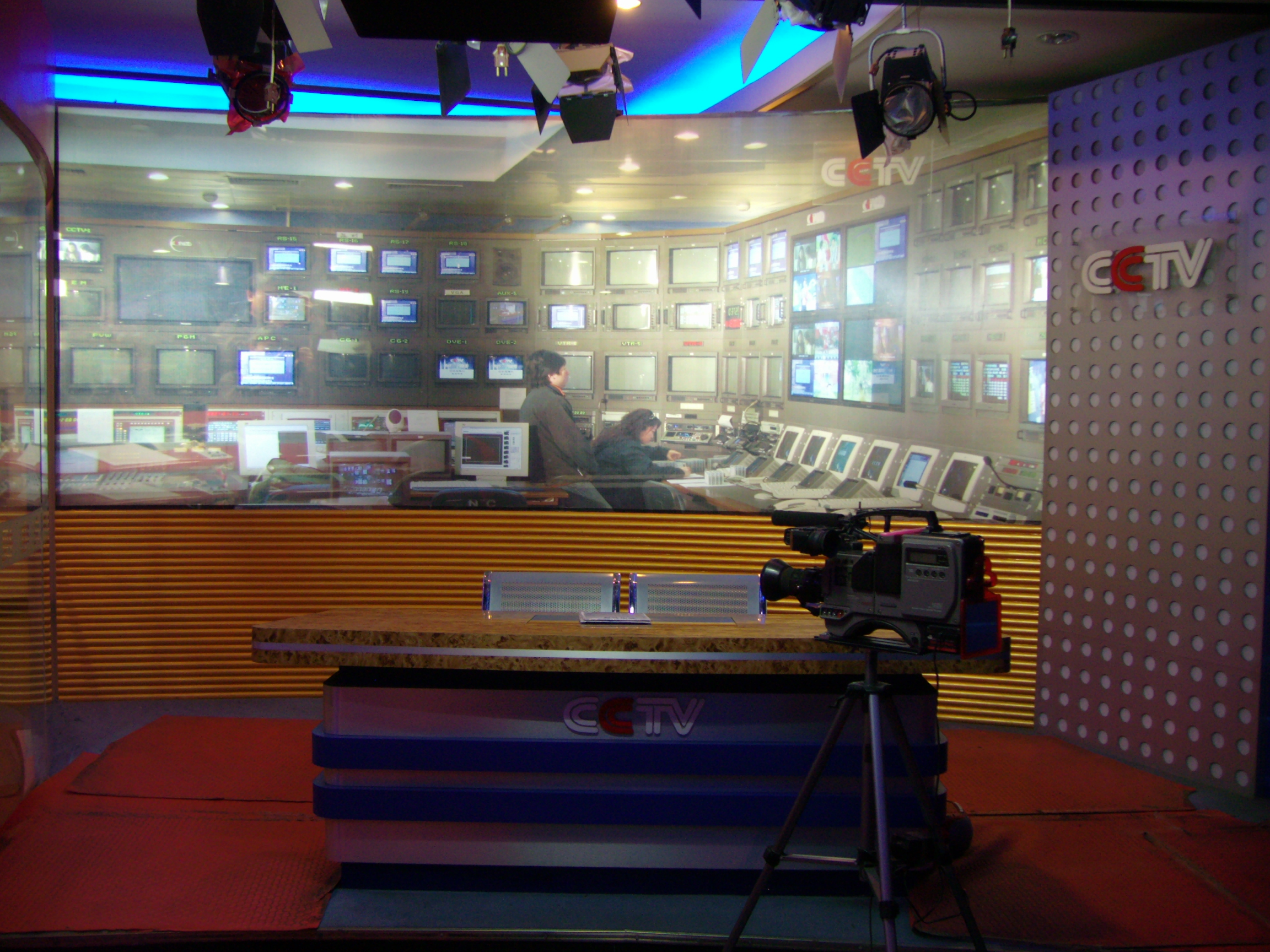

== See also ==
- List of tallest buildings in Beijing
- List of tallest towers in the world
- List of tallest freestanding structures in the world
- Fernsehturm Stuttgart – first TV tower built from concrete and prototype

Media buildings in Beijing

- China Media Group Headquarters
- CCTV Headquarters (another building that is sometimes also called "CCTV Tower")
- Beijing Television Cultural Center
- Beijing TV Centre
- Phoenix Center
