= List of tallest buildings in Beijing =

Tall buildings in Beijing
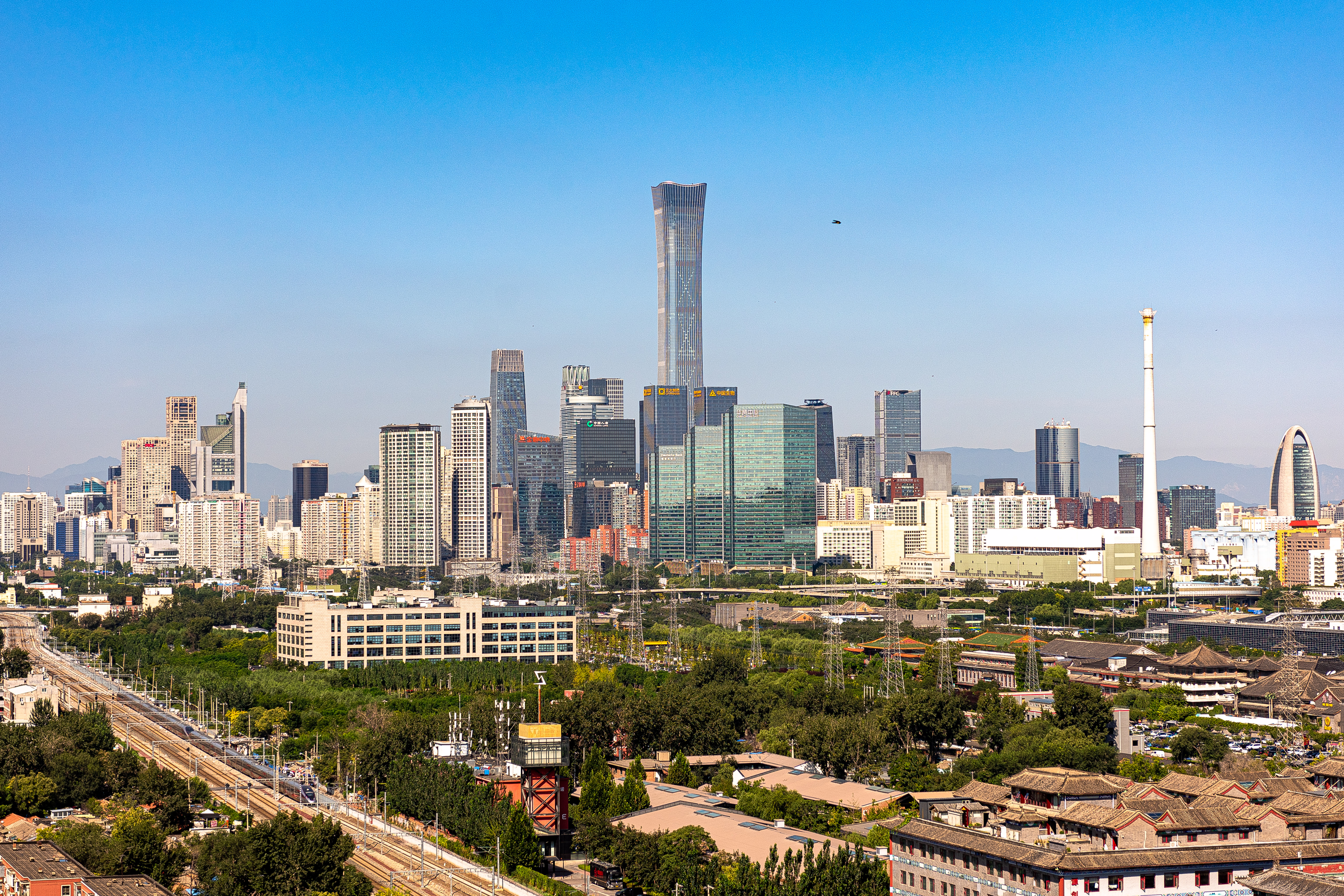
- The Beijing CBD with China Zun in the center and China World Trade Center Tower III on the left
- Tallest building: China Zun (2019)
- Tallest building height: 527.7 m (1,732 ft)
- First 150 m+ building: Capital Mansion (1989)

Number of tall buildings
- Taller than 150 m (492 ft): 70 (2025)
- Taller than 200 m (656 ft): 27 (2025)
- Taller than 300 m (984 ft): 2
- Taller than 400 m (1,312 ft): 1

This list of tallest buildings in Beijing ranks skyscrapers in Beijing by height. The tallest building in Beijing is currently the 109-storey China Zun at 528 metres (1,732 ft) tall, surpassing the 330 metres (1,083 ft) China World Trade Centre Tower III upon completion in 2018. The third tallest building as of 2020 is China World Trade Center Phase 3B at 295.6 metres (970 ft). As of 2025, there are 70 buildings in Beijing taller than 150 meters in height.

Despite being one of China's largest cities, Beijing has a relatively low number of skyscrapers compared to cites of a similar size like Shanghai or Shenzhen.

== History ==
The history of skyscrapers in Beijing began in 1959 with the completion of the Minzu Hotel. Beijing's skyline gradually expanded upward at a modest rate for three decades. The completion of the China World Trade Center Tower 1 in 1989 marked the beginning of Beijing's first building boom that lasted ten years. During this time period, four skyscrapers taller than 150 m (492 ft) were completed, including the 208 m (682 ft) Jing Guang Centre, which stood as the tallest building in Beijing from 1990–2006. A second, much larger boom began in 2004 and continues into the present, where twelve skyscrapers taller than 150 m (492 ft) were finished. Many of the skyscrapers completed during both building booms are located in Chaoyang District, including the Beijing TV Centre, Park Tower and Fortune Plaza Office Building 1, all of which served as the tallest building in the city for a time. In December 2008, the number of completed highrise buildings were increased to 895 in Beijing.

Another famous project in the city is the 234 m (768 ft), 51-storey CCTV Headquarters building, nicknamed "Big Shorts". The skyscraper is not a traditional tower, but a continuous loop of five horizontal and vertical sections, creating an irregular grid on the building's facade with an open center. With 389,079 square metres (4,188,010 sq ft) of office space, the skyscraper is the largest office building in China and the second-largest in the world, after the Pentagon. In December 2008, there were 45 projects under construction and proposed in Beijing.

== Tallest buildings ==
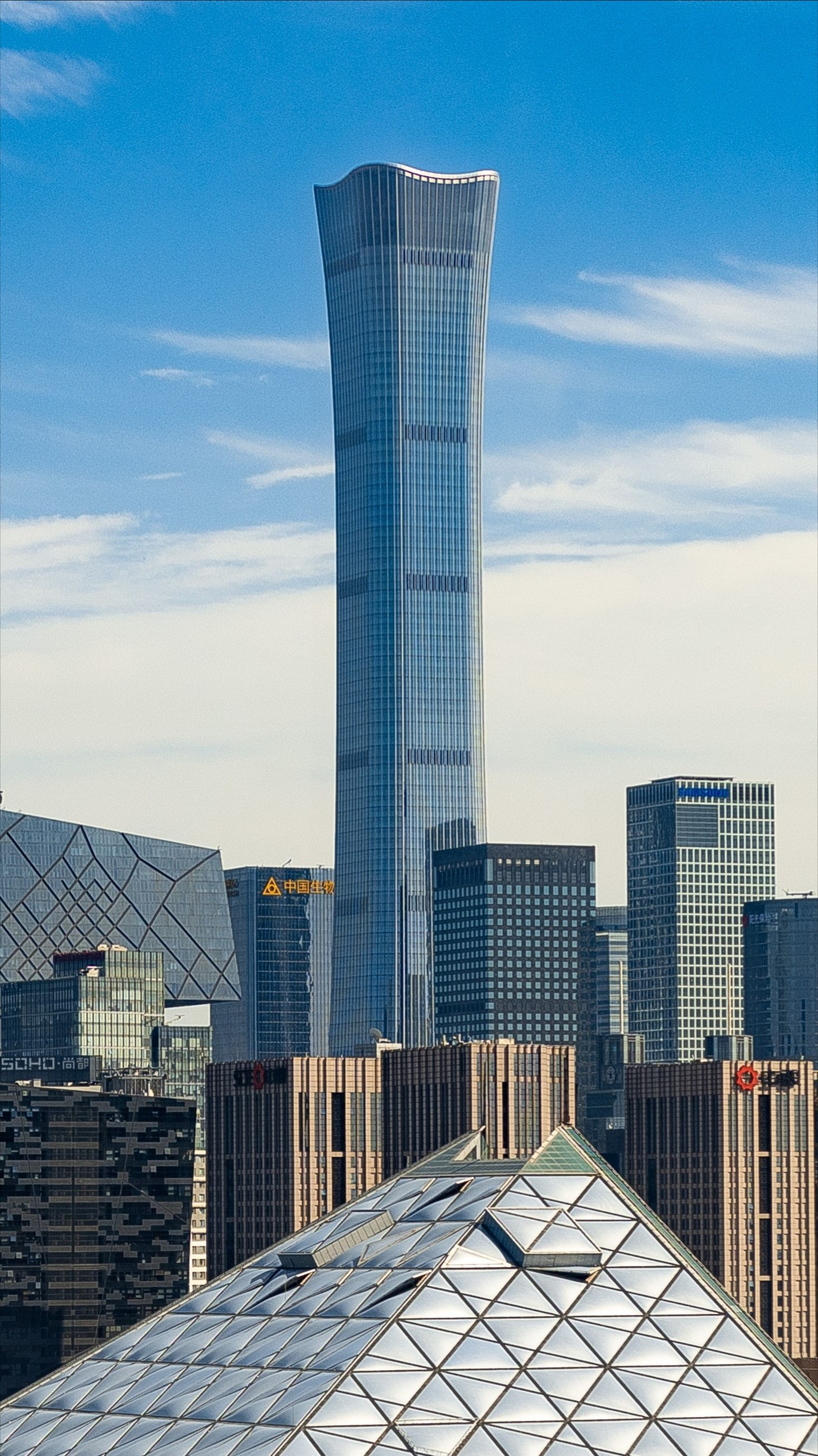
China Zun

This lists ranks Beijing skyscrapers that stand at least 150 m (492 ft) tall, based on standard height measurement. This includes spires and architectural details but does not include antenna masts. Existing structures are included for ranking purposes based on present height.

Rank	Name	Height m / ft	Floors	Year	Notes
1	China Zun	527.7 / 1,732	109	2018	The 10th-tallest building in the world as of 2018.
-	Central Radio & TV Tower	410.5/ 1,347	n/a	1992	Not an actual building since it doesn't include habitable floors.
2	China World Trade Center Tower III	330 / 1,083	74	2010	Tallest building in Beijing between 2009 and 2018.
3	China World Trade Center Phase 3B	295.6 / 970	70	2017	
4	Fortune Financial Center III	265 / 869	63	2014	
5	Beijing Greenland Center	260 / 853	63	2016	
6	Samsung China Headquarters	260 / 853	57	2018	
7	Beijing Yintai Centre - Park Tower	250 / 820	63	2008	This building is also known as Beijing Yintai Center - Tower 2.
-	Olympic Park Observation Tower	243 / 797	n/a	2014	A set of observation towers, not considered actual buildings.
8	Beijing TV Centre	239 / 784	41	2006	
9	Sino-Ocean Ledi Port Tower 2	239 / 784	45	2022	
10	Z14 Plot Development 1	238 / 781	48	2018	Also known as Zhengda International Center.
11	Z14 Plot Development 2	238 / 781	48	2018	Also known as the Center of International Chinese Merchants
12	CCTV Headquarters	234 / 768	51	2009	This building is the 9th tallest in the city. This building is nicknamed "Big Shorts".
13	Tsinghua University Campus - Z1 Lot	231 / 758	50	2018	Site of the Academy of Arts & Design of Tsinghua University.
14	Dawangjing 618 Tower 1	227 / 745	53	2018	
15	Taikang Headquarters Building	223.4 / 733	45	2021	
16	Dawangjing 626 Tower 1	220 / 722	44	2018	
17	Dawangjing 626 Tower 2	216 / 708	40	2018	
18	Jing Guang Center	208 / 682	53	1989	This is the tallest building completed in Beijing before 2000; opened in December 1989.
19	Leeza SOHO	207 / 679	46	2019	Tallest twisting atrium in the world (198 m/623 ft).
20	Sunshine Insurance Headquarters	205 / 673	42	2021	
21	Sunshine Financial Center	205 / 673	42	2021	
22	Ping An Fortune Center Tower A	203.7 / 668	45	2021	
23	Noble Center	200 / 656	41	2015	
24	Wangjing SOHO Tower 3	200 / 656	45	2014	
25	Huiya Building	200 / 656	42	2019	
26	General Times Tower B	200 / 656	43	2021	
27	National Financial Information Building	200 / 656	39	2024	
28	Fortune Heights	199.9 / 656	60	2008	
29	Beijing Lize Ping An Finance Centre	199.9 / 656	41	2020	
30	RAYZONE	199.9 / 656	42	2021	
31	Pangu Plaza Office Building	192 / 629	39	2008	
32	Xingguang Center Tower 2	190 / 623	35	2024	
33	Xingguang Center Tower 3	190 / 623	35	2024	
34	China Life Insurance Financial Center	188 / 616	38	2019	
35	Beijing Yintai Centre - Yintai Office Tower	186 / 610	42	2008	This building is also known as Silvertie Center Tower 1.
36	Beijing Yintai Centre - PICC Office Tower	186 / 610	42	2008	This building is also known as the Park Hyatt Hotel at Silvertie Center.
37	Capital Mansion	183 / 602	52	1990	
38	China Construction Group Financial Center	180 / 590	37	2017	
39	People's Daily New Headquarters	180 / 590	33	2015	
40	General Times Center Tower A	180 / 590	39	2020	
41	Ping An Finance Centre Tower B	179.9 / 590	38	2020	
42	Radiance Tower B	176 / 577	37	2017	Also known as Jinhui Mansion.
43	Sino-Ocean Ledi Port Tower 2	175 / 574	36	2024	
44	Dawangjing 618 Tower 3	169.7 / 557	37	2018	
45	Gemdale Plaza Tower A	168 / 551	35	2007	
46	China Central Place Tower 1	167 / 548	36	2006	This building is also known as Huamao Center Tower 1.
47	Beijing Nexus Center	163.9 / 538	37	2009	
48	Poly International Plaza – Dawangjing	161 / 528	43	2017	
49	Beijing Television Cultural Center	159 / 522	33	2012	Destroyed by fire in 2009, rebuilt in 2012. Also known by the name of its main occupant, Mandarin Oriental Hotel.
50	Fortune Plaza Office Building II	155 / 509	46	2006	
51	China World Trade Center Tower II	155 / 509	39	1999	
52	China World Trade Center Tower I	155 / 509	39	1989	
53	Central International Trade Center - Tower A	155 / 509	36	2005	
54	Central International Trade Center - Tower B	155 / 509	36	2005	
55	Posco Center	154 / 505	35	2015	
56	Dawangjing 618 Tower 2	153.6 / 504	37	2018	
57	Beijing IFC West Tower A/B	153 / 502	36	2010	
58	Beijing Goldfield Plaza Tower A	151.4 / 497	35	2009	
59	China Central Place Tower 2	151 / 495	32	2007	This building is also known as Huamao Center Tower 2.
60	Zhongguancun Financial Center	150 / 492	37	2006	
61	Zhonghai Plaza Tower 1	150 / 492	35	2008	
62	China Merchants Tower	150 / 492	34	1997	
63	Beijing Greenland Center Office Tower 1	150 / 492	34	2015	
64	Beijing Greenland Center Office Tower 2	150 / 492	34	2015	
65	Topwin Center & InterContinental Beijing Sanlitun	150 / 492	37	2016	
66	Heng Yi Building	150 / 492	31	2017	
67	Beijing Capital Land Lize Financial Center Hotel	150 / 492	39	2019	
68	Beijing Capital Land Lize Financial Center Tower 1	150 / 492	30	2019	
69	Ju Jie Financial Center Tower 1	150 / 492	30	2019	

* Indicates still under construction, but has been topped out.

== Tallest under construction or proposed ==
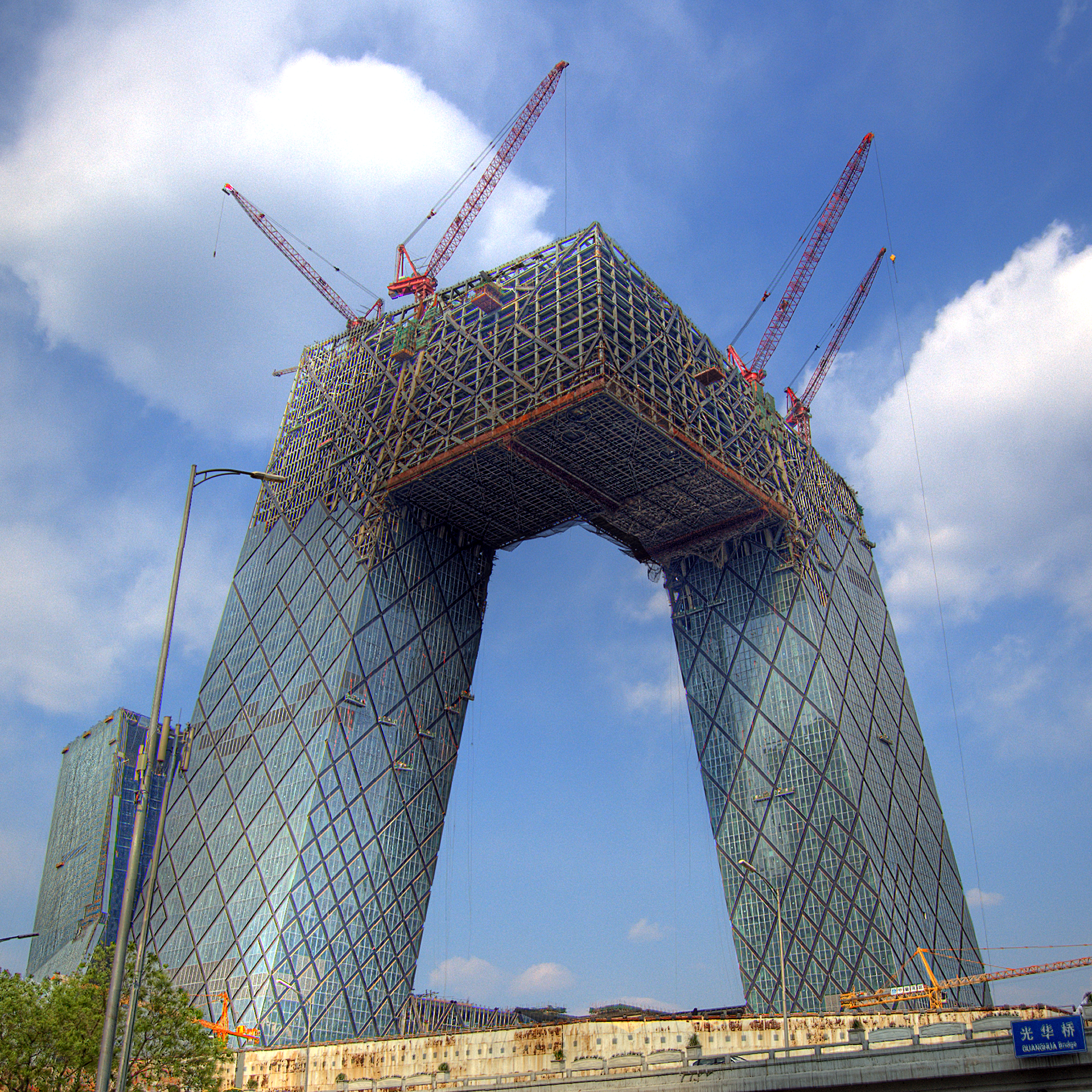
The CCTV Headquarters tower in April 2008

This lists skyscrapers that are under construction and proposed in Beijing and planned to rise over 150 m (492 ft), but are not yet completed.

=== Under construction ===
Name	Height m / ft	Floors*	Year	Notes
Tongzhou Transportation Hub Tower 1	240 / 787	unknown	2027	
Tongzhou R&F Center Tower 1	170 / 558	unknown	unknown	
Tongzhou R&F Center Tower 2	unknown	unknown		

== Timeline of tallest buildings ==
This is a list of buildings that in the past held the title of tallest building in Beijing.

Name	Street address	Years as tallest	Height m / ft	Floors	Reference
National Minority Hotel	51 Fuxingmennei Avenue	1959—1964	49 / 161	12	
ACAAC Office Building	15 West Chang'an Avenue	1964—1974	61 / 200	15	
Beijing Hotel East Wing	33 East Chang'an Avenue	1974—1984	77 / 253	20	
Xiyuan Hotel	1 Sanlihe Road	1984—1985	93 / 305	27	
CITIC Building	19 Jianguomenwai Avenue	1985—1986	101 / 331	29	
China Central Television	11 Fuxin Road	1986—1989	112 / 367	27	
China World Trade Center Tower 1	1 Jianguomenwai Avenue	1989—1990	155 / 509	39	
Jing Guang Center	Corner of Hu Jia Lou and Chao Yang Qu	1990—2006	208 / 682	53	
Beijing TV Centre	Chang An Street	2006—2007	239 / 784	41	
Park Tower	2 Jianguomenwai Avenue	2007—2008	250 / 820	63	
Fortune Plaza Office Building 1	Corner of East Third Ring Road and Chaoyangmenwai Avenue	2008	260 / 853	63	
China World Trade Center Tower 3	1 Jianguomenwai Avenue	2008—2018	330 / 1,083	74	
China Zun	Z15 plot Guanghua Road	2018–present	527 / 1,732	109	

== Notes ==
A. The Central Radio & TV Tower is not a habitable building, but is included in this list for comparative purposes. Per a ruling by the Council on Tall Buildings and Urban Habitat, freestanding TV towers are not considered to be buildings, as they are not fully habitable structures, although one could reside there its function is not office or residential.
