= Ingenhoven Associates =

ingenhoven associates
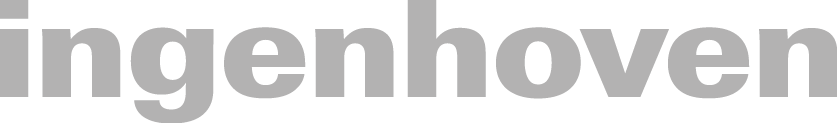
- Formerly: ingenhoven architects
- Type: Architectural practice
- Industry: architecture, interior design, landscape design, product design, research and development
- Founded: 1985
- Headquarters: Düsseldorf, Germany
- Key people: Martin Reuter (Chairman of the Management); Michael Rathgeb (Managing Director)
- Number of employees: 100
- Website: www.ingenhovenarchitects.com

ingenhoven associates is an architectural firm based in Düsseldorf, Germany. The office was founded in 1985 by Christoph Ingenhoven and became notable for its ecologically oriented designs for high-rise buildings. Former names of the company were Ingenhoven Overdiek and Partner and ingenhoven architects.

== Design ==
Ingenhoven associates designed the RWE Tower in Essen, a naturally ventilated double-skin facade high-rise building. Other low-energy office buildings by the office are the Lufthansa Headquarters in Frankfurt, the European Investment Bank in Luxembourg, the Breezé Tower in Osaka, 1 Bligh Street building in Sydney and the Marina One complex in Singapore.

== Projects (selection) ==
- 2017 Marina One Singapore
- 2020 Theatre Düsseldorf
- 2021 Kö-Bogen II Düsseldorf
- 2022 Toranomon HillsToranomon Hills Tokyo
- 2022 Lanserhof Sylt

== Awards (selection) ==
- 2006 Global Holcim Awards for Sustainable Construction Gold for Stuttgart Main Station
- 2012 International High-Rise Award for 1 Bligh
- 2021 Green Good Design Sustainability Award for Kö-Bogen II
- 2021 Iconic Awards Best of Best Kö-Bogen II
- 2021 Prix Versailles for Kö-Bogen II
- 2022 European Prize for Architecture
- 2023 MIPIM Awards, Best Hospitality, Leisure and Tourism for Lanserhof Sylt
- 2023 Green Good Design Sustainability Award for Toranomon Hills Tokyo
- 2023 AHEAD Award Hotel Newbuild Lanserhof Sylt
- 2023 WAF Award for Lanserhof Sylt
- 2024 Dezeen Award – Mixed-Use-Project of the year 2024, Calwer Passage Stuttgart
- 2025 German Sustainability Award for Companies 2025
