= Christoph Ingenhoven =

German architect

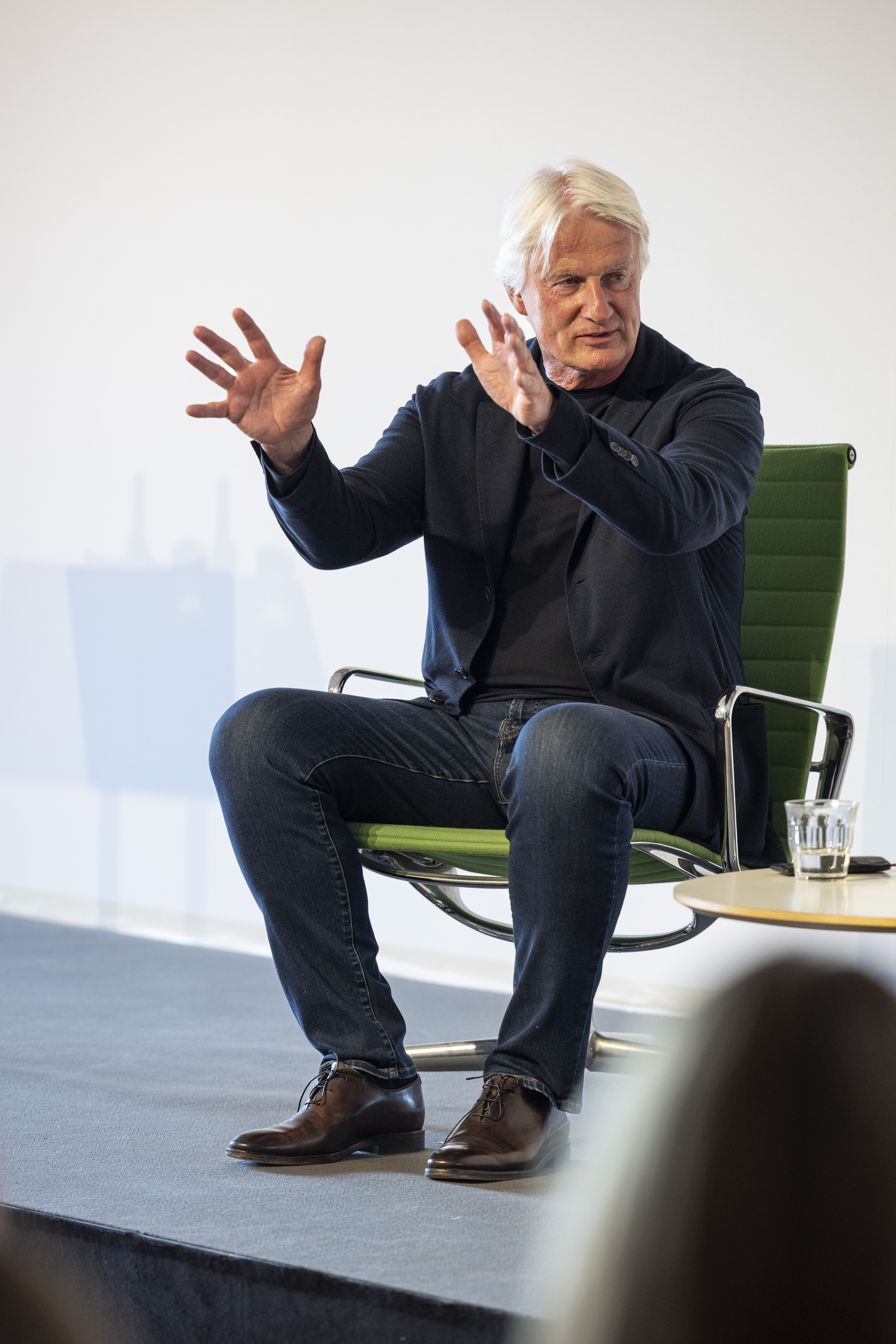
- 2022 in Düsseldorf
- Born: 8 March 1960 (age 66); Düsseldorf, Germany
- Education: RWTH Aachen, Kunstakademie Düsseldorf
- Occupation: Architect
- Practice: christoph ingenhoven architects
- Buildings: RWE Tower Essen; Stuttgart Main Station; Lufthansa Aviation Center; 1 Bligh Sydney; Marina One Singapore

Christoph Ingenhoven (born 8 March 1960) is a German architect. His major works include Lufthansa HQ in Frankfurt (2006), 1 Bligh in Sydney (2011), Marina One in Singapore (2017), Toranomon Hills Towers in Tokyo (2022), and Stuttgart Main Station (2010–).

== Career ==
Christoph Ingenhoven was born in Düsseldorf in 1960 and studied architecture at the RWTH Aachen from 1978 to 1984 and from 1980 to 1981 at the Kunstakademie Düsseldorf with Hans Hollein. In 1985, Christoph Ingenhoven founded the architecture office ingenhoven architects in Düsseldorf, which was acquired by BKW Energie in 2019. Today, he heads his architecture studio under the name christoph ingenhoven architects with headquarters in Düsseldorf.

Christoph Ingenhoven received international recognition in 1997 with the design of one of the world's first ecological high-rise buildings, the RWE Tower in Essen. Before, in 1991, the then 31-year-old Ingenhoven received a great deal of attention when he and his team competed in the international competition for the Commerzbank Tower in Frankfurt and shared jury prize with Norman Foster. The fact that Foster was commissioned to build the skyscraper prompted Frei Otto to make a public statement in which he spoke out in favor of the young German architect's design.

Christoph Ingenhoven is a founding member of the German Sustainable Building Council (DGNB) and the Bundesstiftung Baukultur, a federal foundation for architectural culture in Germany. He is member of the International Academy of Architecture.

== Style and philosophy ==
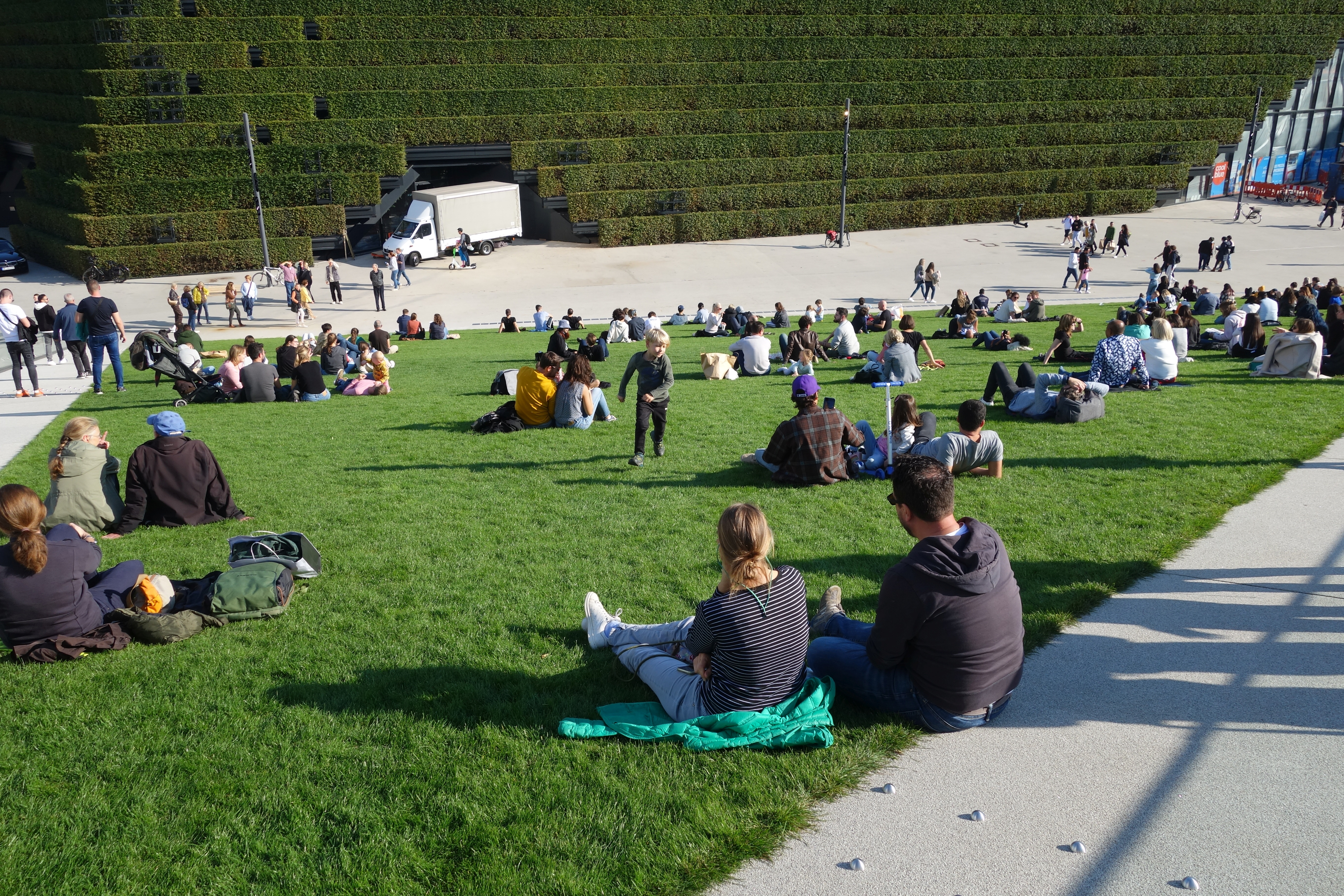
Lawn roof in front of Kö-Bogen II with Europe's largest green facade

Christoph Ingenhoven pursues an approach to sustainable architecture that strives for the highest ecological, architectural and artistic goals. The structural designs provide for the use of natural resources such as sunlight, geothermal energy, rainwater and air conditioning through natural ventilation and are adapted to the surrounding (urban) landscape as site-specifically as possible. Ingenhoven calls his concept of holistic, interdisciplinary, sustainable architecture supergreen. In addition to the ecological aspects, the supergreen concept also includes social and humanistic aspects.

== Awards and honours ==
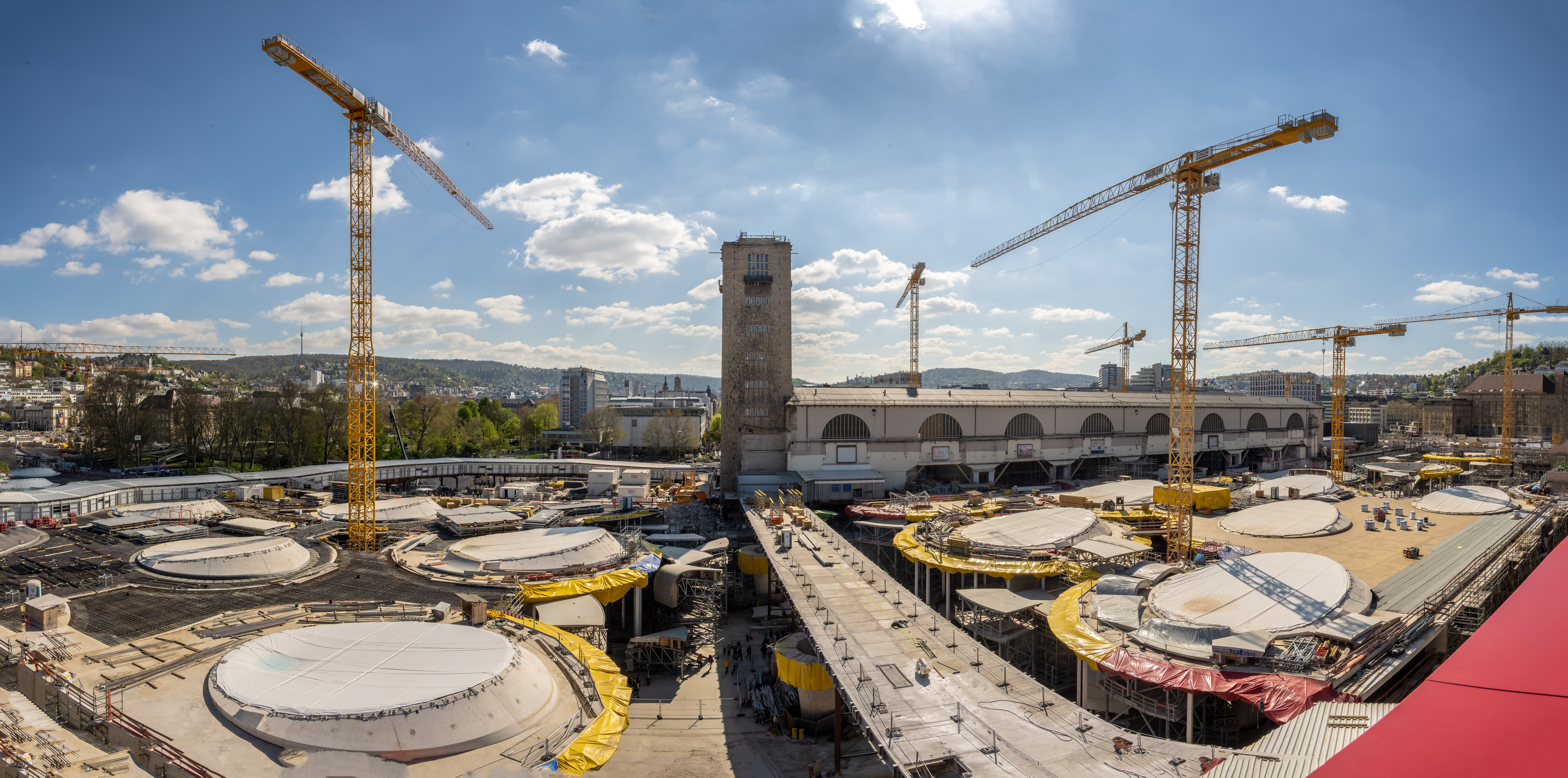
Construction work for the new railway station in Stuttgart

Christoph Ingenhoven's works received numerous national and international awards and recognitions, including the Holcim Awards for Sustainable Construction Gold for Stuttgart Main Station and the International High-Rise Award for 1 Bligh in Sydney. His projects have received several MIPIM and WAF awards, e.g. the Lanserhof Sylt won both in 2023.

Christoph Ingenhoven was recipient of Europe's highest architecture award in 2022, the European Prize for Architecture. The Saxon Academy of Arts honored Ingenhoven with the Gottfried Semper Prize 2019. The German structural engineer and architect Werner Sobek delivered the laudatory speech at the award ceremony in Dresden. In 2023, Christoph Ingenhoven has been awarded the Golden Flower, Germany's oldest environmental prize, which has been awarded biennally since 1967. In 2024, he was awarded the AW Architect of the Year. This award was the occasion for the exhibition Stuttgart Main Station. A Once-in-a-Century Project Becomes Reality at the Aedes Architecture Forum in Berlin.

== Memberships ==
- International Academy of Architecture, UNESCO
- Bundesstiftung Baukultur (founding member)
- German Sustainable Building Council DGNB (founding member)
- Council on Tall Buildings and Urban Habitat (CTBUH)
- North Rhine-Westphalia Academy for Science and Arts
- Association of German Architects (BDA)
- American Institute of Architects (AIA)
- Royal Institute of British Architects (RIBA)
- Swiss Society of Engineers and Architects (SIA)
- Australian Institute of Architects
- North Rhine-Westphalia Association of Architects (AKNW)

== Projects (selection) ==
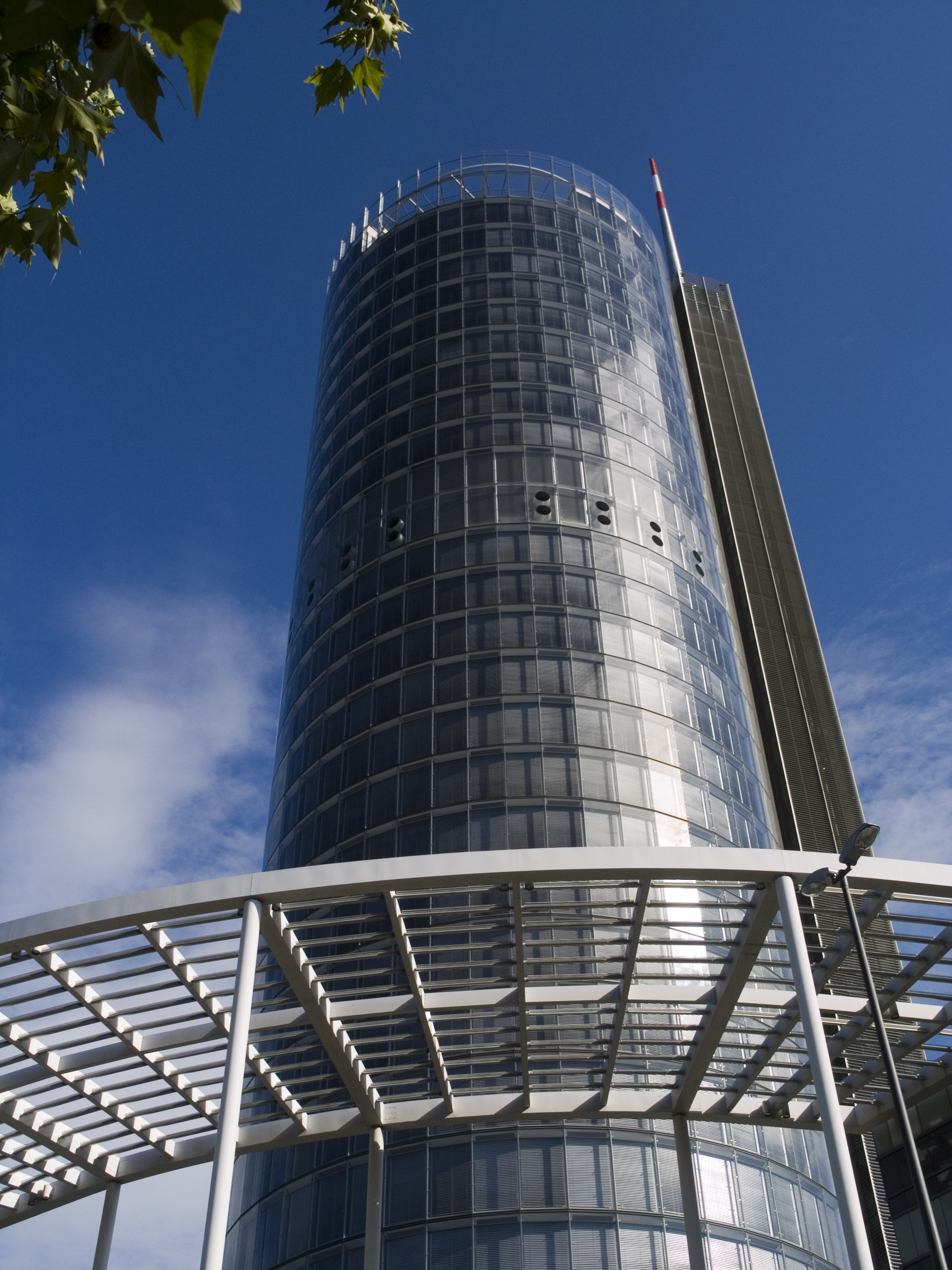
RWE Tower Essen (1997)

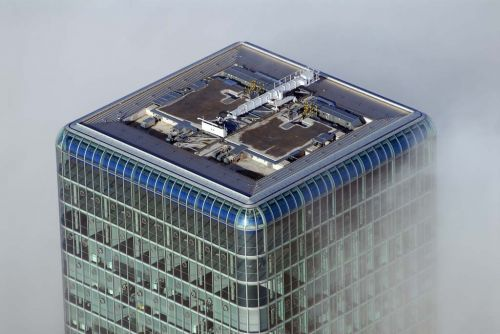
Uptown Munich - O2 Headquarters (2005)

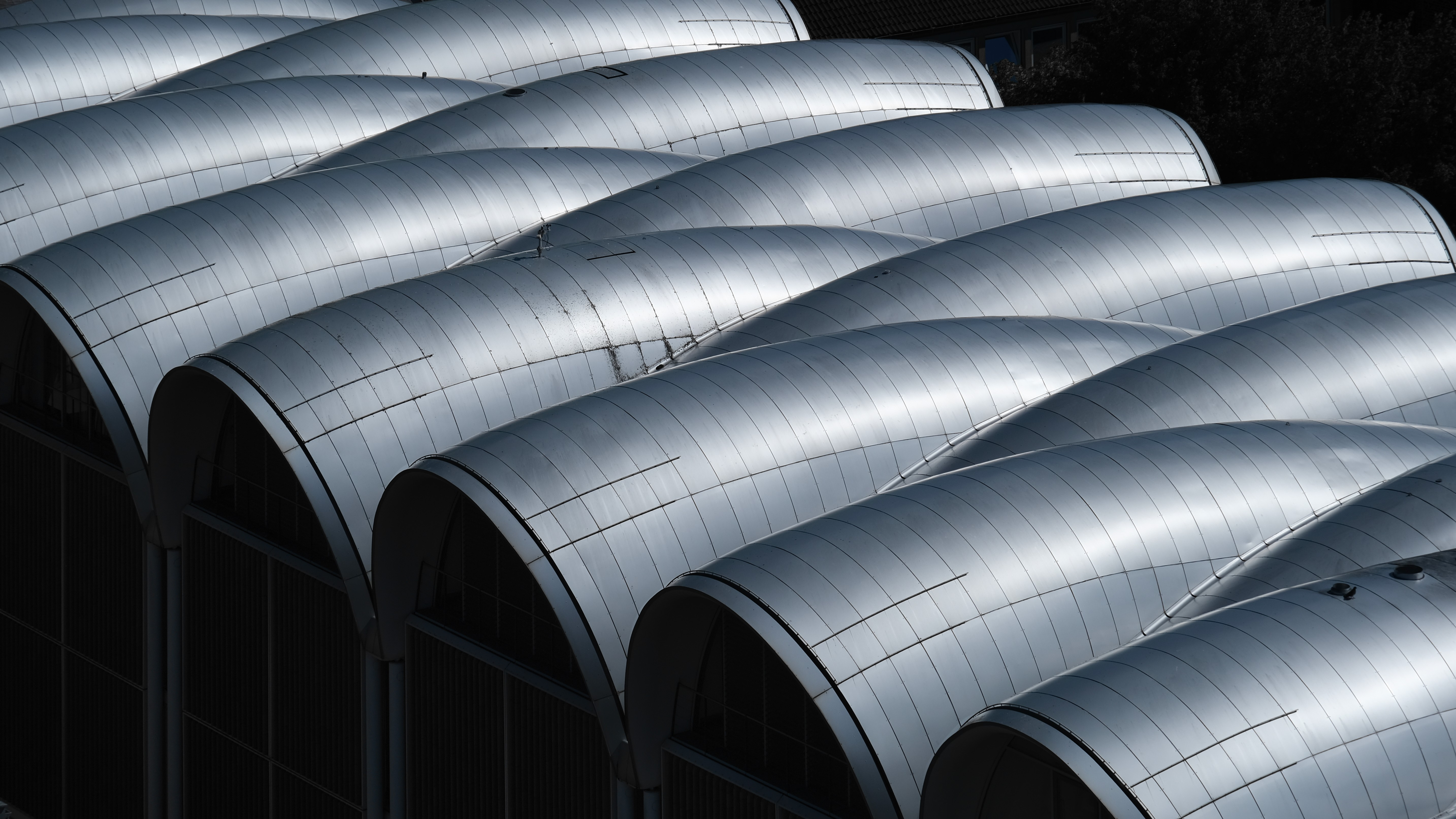
P&C Lübeck (2005)

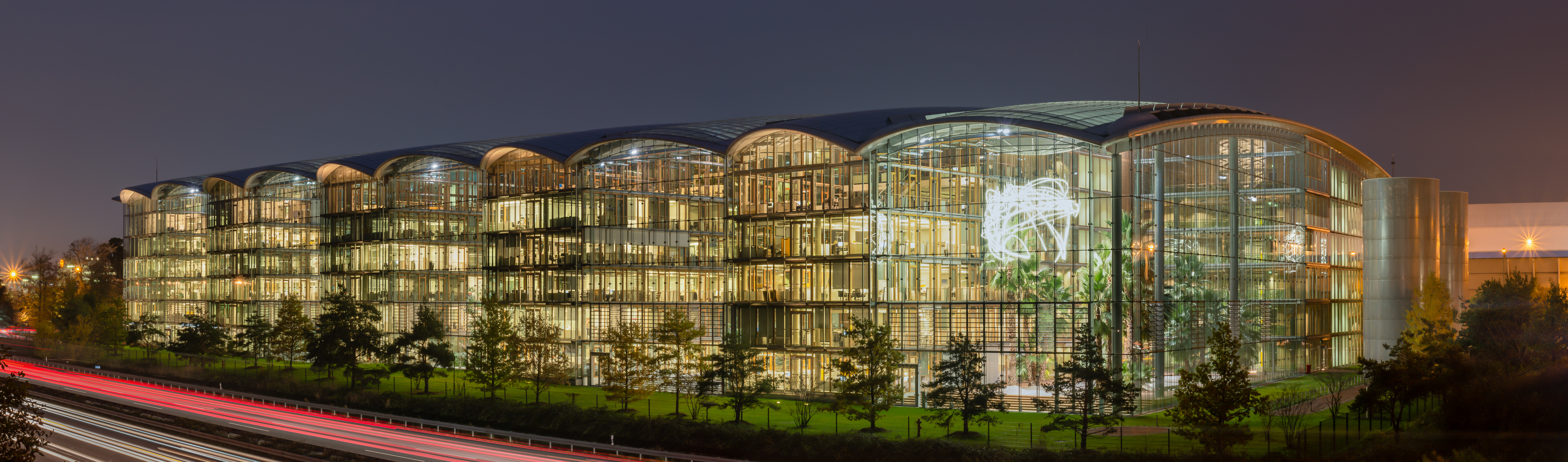
Lufthansa Aviation Center / Lufthansa Headquarters Frankfurt (2006)

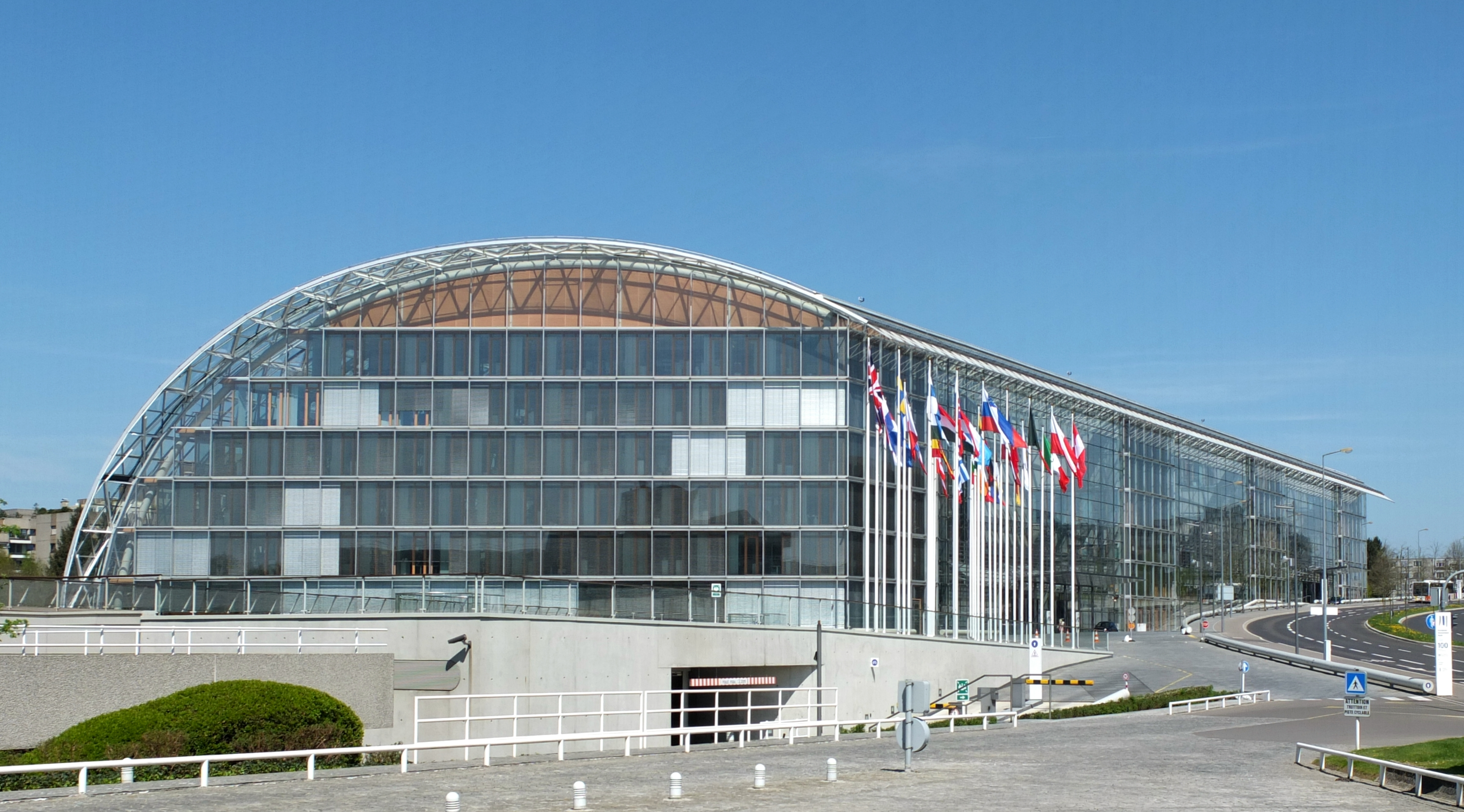
European Investment Bank Headquarters Luxembourg (2008)

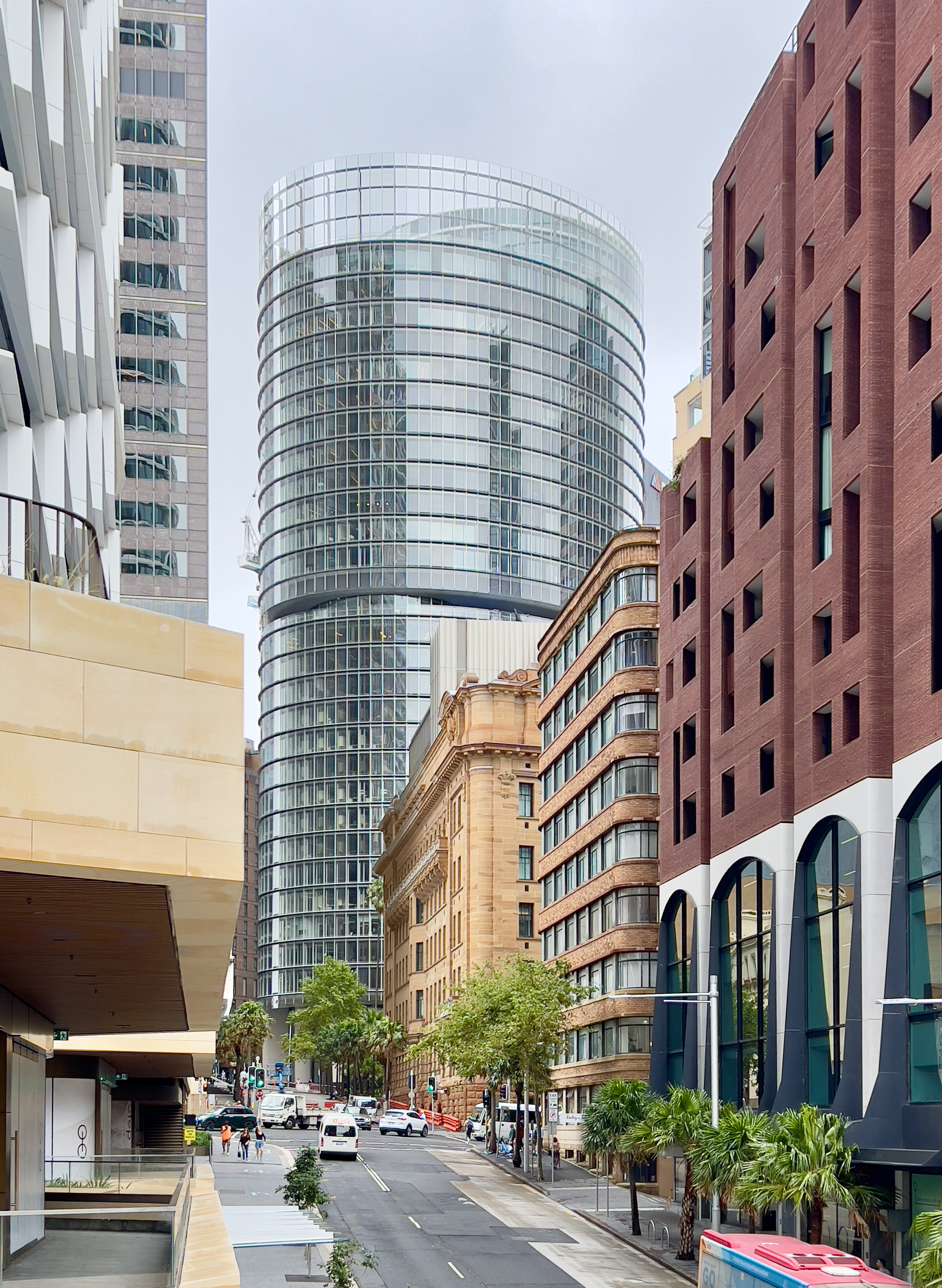
1 Bligh Sydney (2011)

=== Completed buildings ===
- 1997: RWE-Tower, Essen
- 1999–2001: Audi Pavillon for trade fairs in Frankfurt, Tokyo, Detroit and Paris
- 2005: Uptown (O2-Tower) Munich
- 2005: Peek & Cloppenburg Lübeck
- 2005: Private House Düsseldorf
- 2006: Lufthansa Aviation Center Frankfurt
- 2008: European Investment Bank Luxembourg
- 2008: Breeze Tower Osaka
- 2008: New Trade Fair Hamburg
- 2009: Sky Office Düsseldorf
- 2011: 1 Bligh Street, Sydney
- 2010: Swarovski HQ at Lake Zurich
- 2011: HDI Gerling HQ, Hannover
- 2014: Lanserhof Lake Tegern
- 2015: Institute of Mathematics at Karlsruhe Institute of Technology
- 2017: Town Hall Freiburg
- 2017: Marina One Singapore
- 2019: Oeconomicum Heinrich Heine University Düsseldorf
- 2021: Kö-Bogen II Düsseldorf
- 2021: Renovation Düsseldorfer Schauspielhaus
- 2022: Toranomon Hills Towers Tokyo
- 2022: Lanserhof Sylt
- 2023: Calwer Passage Stuttgart
- 2023: Klinik Gut St. Moritz
- 2024: Joachim-Erwin-Platz 1 Düsseldorf
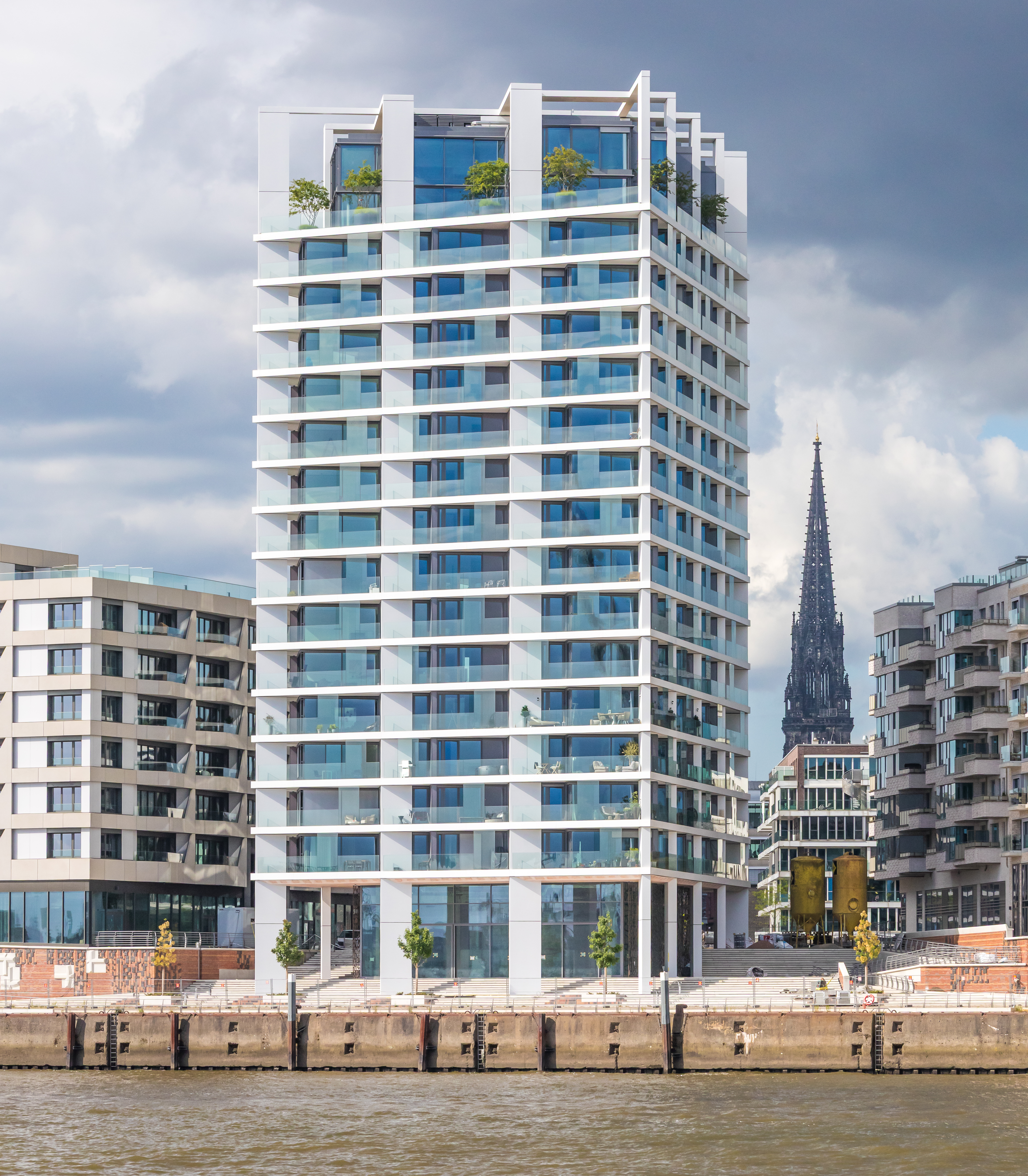
- Strandkai HafenCity Hamburg (2026)
  2026: The Crown, Strandkai HafenCity Hamburg

=== Ongoing work ===
- Stuttgart Main Station
- Dom-Hotel Cologne
- Hotel Arlberg Hospiz in St. Christoph, Austria
- Pier One Düsseldorf
- High-rise 505 George Street in Sydney
- Am Oberwiesenfeld in Munich
- Plange Mühle Campus Düsseldorf
- Kant & Kopf HafenCity Hamburg
- UNIQ Towers Düsseldorf
- 1 Spring Street Melbourne
- Heinrich Hertz Tower Hamburg
- Lanserhof at Finca Cortesin Marbella

=== Competitions and studies ===
- 1991: Commerzbank HQ Frankfurt
- 2000: Airbus Hamburg
- 2001: Central Park Berlin
- 2007: UCD University College Dublin (1st Prize)
- 2008: Bologna Central Station
- 2008: ICC International Criminal Court The Hague (1st Prize)
- 2010: Google Headquarters Mountain View
- 2023: Opera House of the Future Düsseldorf
- 2024: House of the Digital World Hamburg

== Bibliography ==
- Michael Keller/Christoph Ingenhoven (2025). Does something have to come out right away? Relax friends, architecture is architecture! Unfinished Conversations #6. Blackspace Munich. ISBN 978-3-00-085542-9
- Feireiss, Kristin/Commerell, Hans-Jürgen (2024). Christoph Ingenhoven. Stuttgart Main Station - A Once-in-a-Century Project Becomes Reality. Aedes Berlin. ISBN 978-3-94361585-2
- a+u 2015:08 (539) Feature: ingenhoven architects - supergreen
- Ingenhoven, Christoph (2022). Stadt neu denken - Es liegt an uns zu handeln! In: Brunnengräber, Achim: Das Zeitalter der Städte (in German). Jahrbuch Ökologie. Hirzel. ISBN 978-3-7776-3032-8
- Ingenhoven, Christoph (2019). Arbeiten am Raumschiff Erde oder: Die grüne Agora. In: Weibel, Peter: "Von Morgenröten, die noch nicht geleuchtet haben" (in German). Suhrkamp. ISBN 978-3-518-46943-9
- Ingenhoven, Christoph/Altenschmidt, Stefan/Lambertz, Michaela/Mösle, Peter (2018): Praxishandbuch Green Building (in German). De Gruyter. ISBN 978-3-11-027517-9
- Feireis, Kristin (2002). Energies (in German). Birkhäuser. ISBN 3-7643-6667-2
- Ingenhoven Overdiek und Partner/KMS Team (2001): 1/1 Architecture and Design: New Synergies. Birkhäuser. ISBN 3-7643-6466-1
- Ingenhoven, Christoph and Pehnt, Wolfgang (2000). Ingenhoven, Overdiek und Partner 1991–1999. Birkhäuser. ISBN 3-7643-5839-4
