= Consulate General of the United States, Düsseldorf =

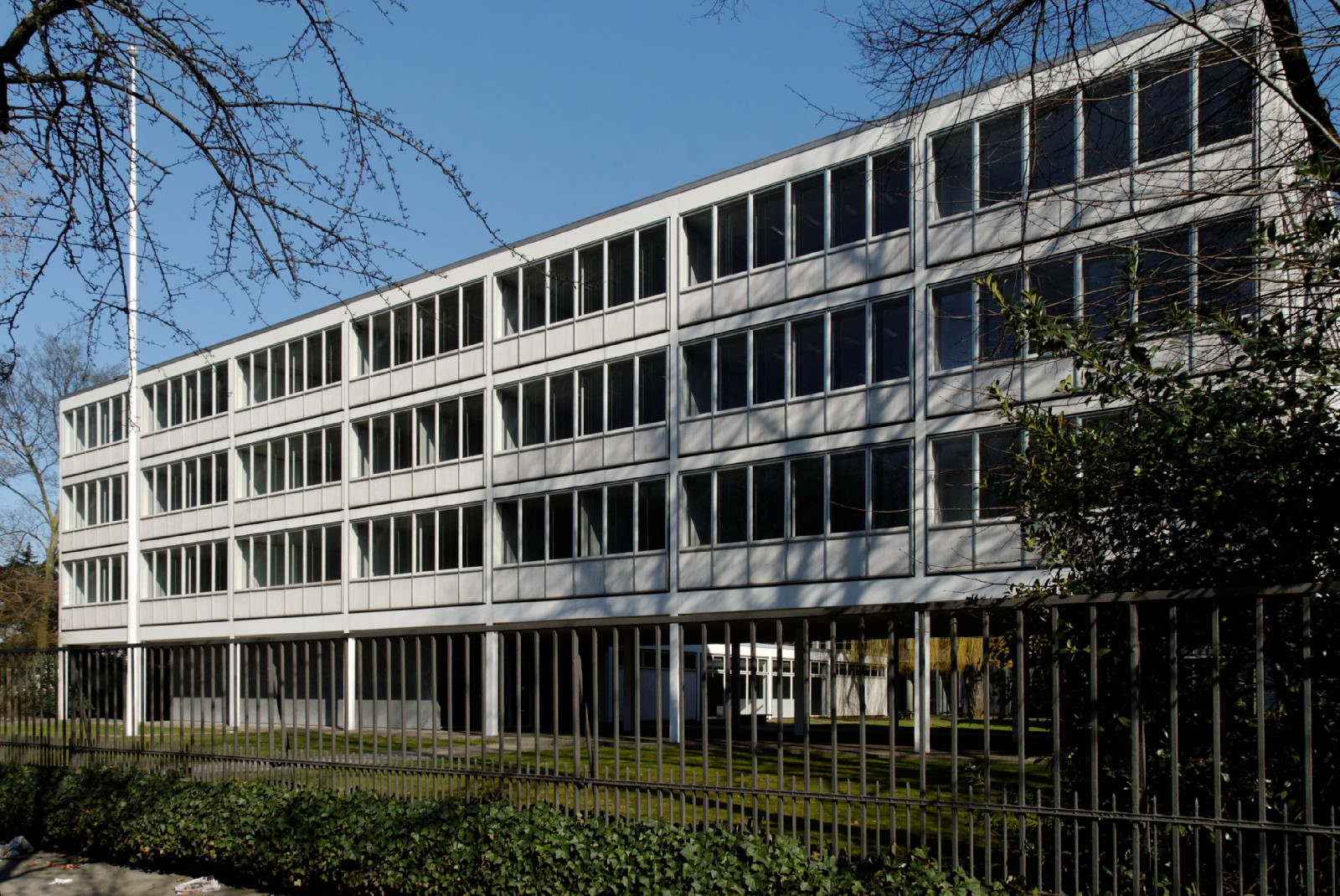
- Location: Golzheim, Düsseldorf, Germany
- Address: Willi-Becker-Allee 10, 40227 Düsseldorf, Federal Republic of Germany
- Coordinates: 51.240439°N 6.771548°E
- Opened: 1953
- Renovated: Early 1990s; 1997-1998
- Website: Official site

The Consulate General of the United States, Düsseldorf is a consular post located in Golzheim, Düsseldorf, Germany. It was built in 1953, designed by Skidmore, Owings & Merrill in the 1950s International Style. The architect Otto Apel implemented the design on-site.

== History ==
In the early 1990s, the building was modernized after the United States moved their consulate to an office building behind the main train station. From 1997 to 1998, the house was renovated by Christoph Ingenhoven and his firm Ingenhoven Associates, and an extension was built on the former parking lot.
