= Weltstadthaus (Cologne) =

Coordinates: 50°56′8.31″N 6°57′10.75″E

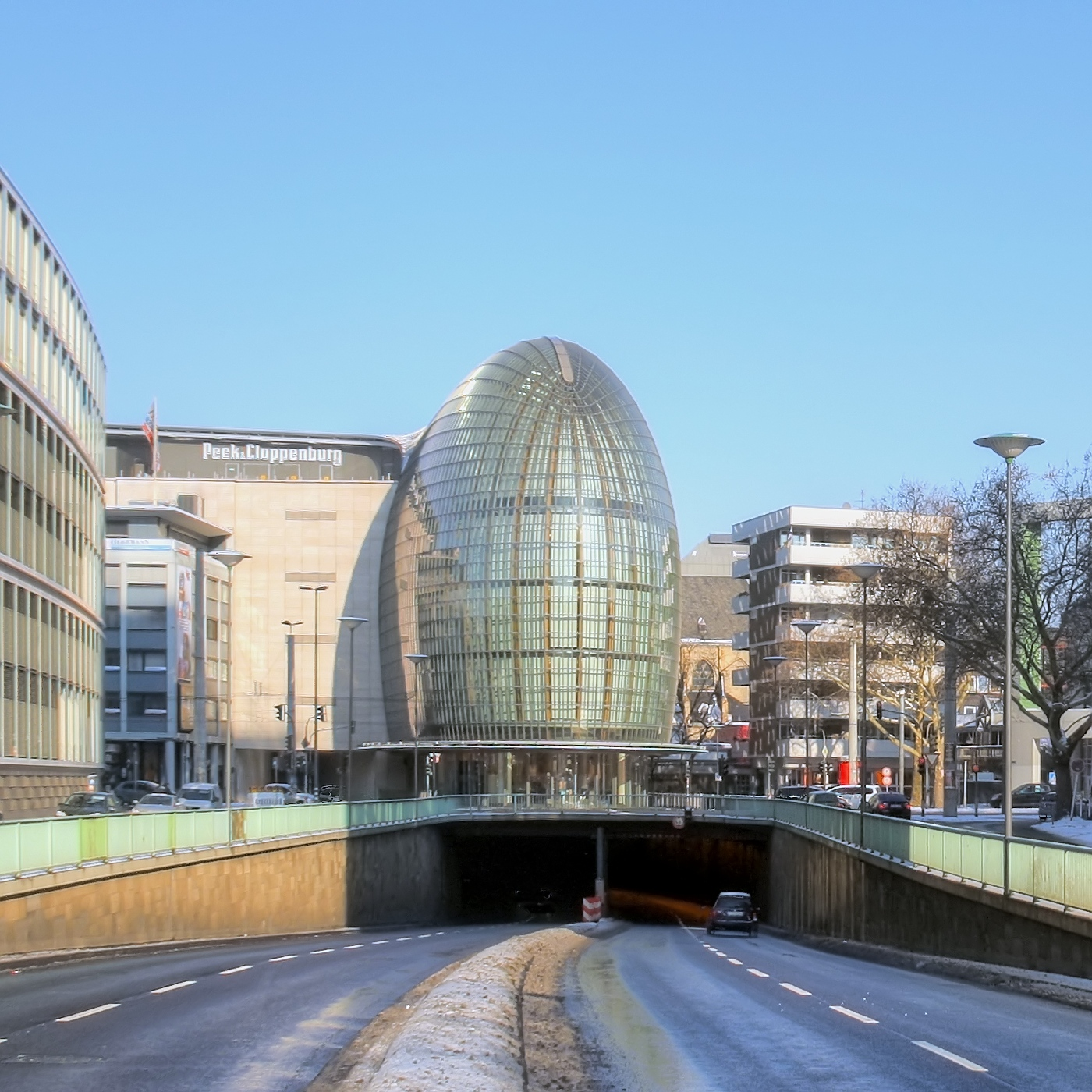
The Weltstadthaus sits atop the Nord-Süd-Fahrt

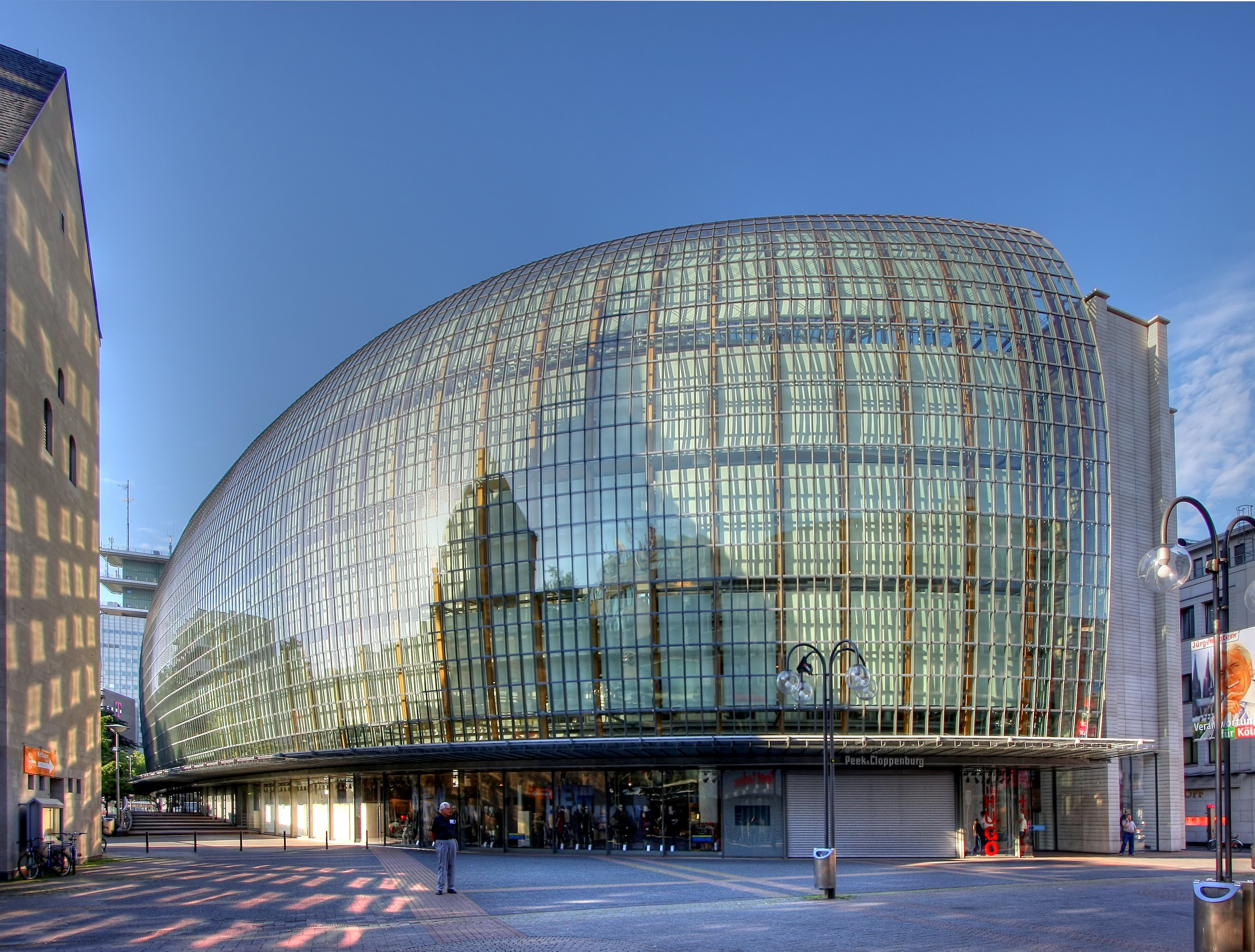
The Weltstadthaus viewed from the Schildergasse

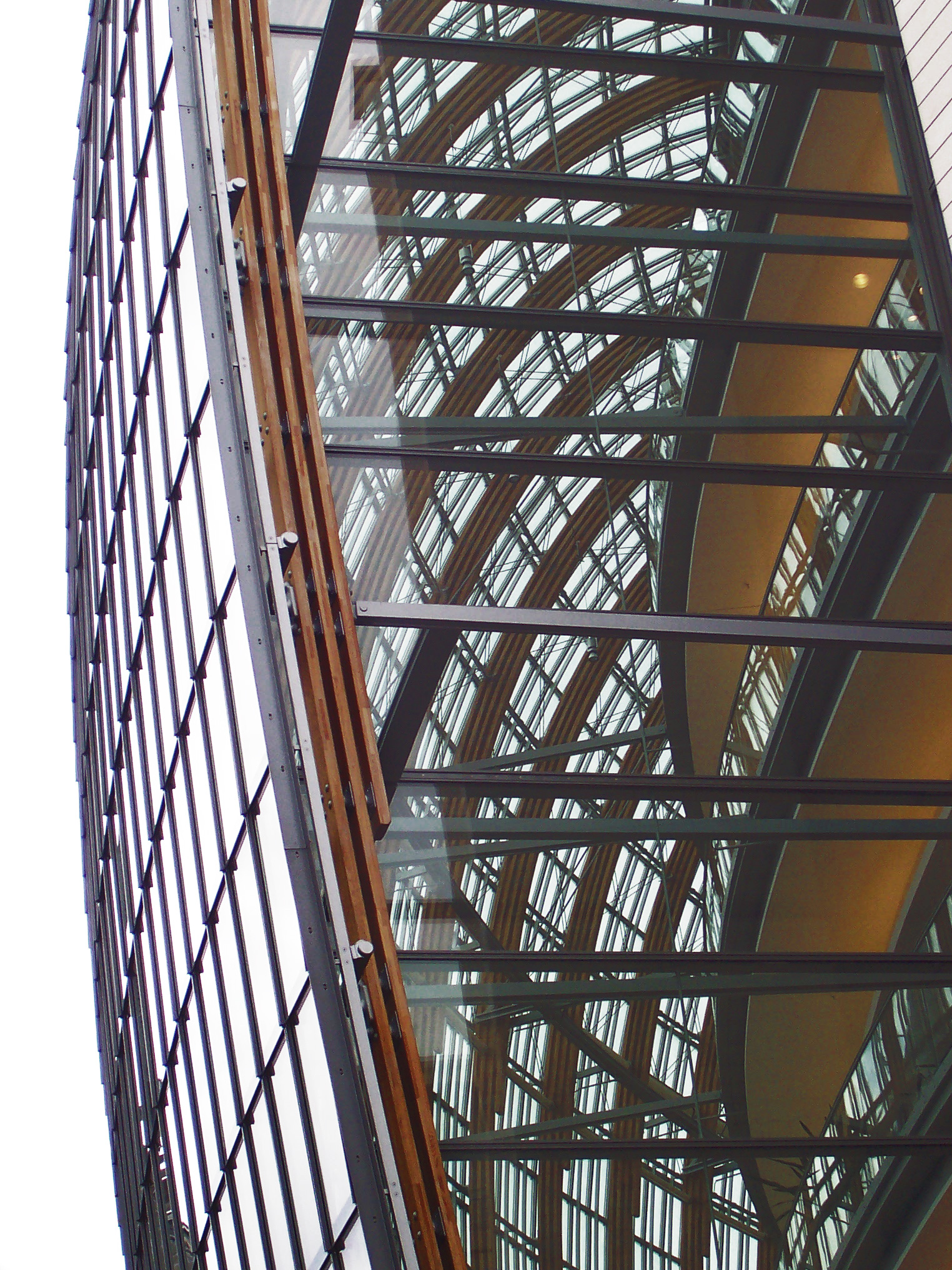
Façade construction of the Weltstadthaus

The Weltstadthaus ("global city building"), housing a department store in Cologne, Germany, was designed by Renzo Piano and completed in 2005, following a lengthy legal battle concerning the structural engineering of the core building. It covers up a main traffic artery, the Nord-Süd-Fahrt, and faces Europe's most frequented shopping mile, the Schildergasse.

== Overview ==
With its unusual, organic shape reminiscent of a ship, but also of a stranded whale -- Kölners have dubbed it the Walfisch--it provides 14.400 m² floor space, on a length of 130 m and a width of 60 m. The atrium offers a view of five stories with a height of 36 m. The 4900 m² glass façade is constructed from 6800 individual panes and 66 massive laminated beams of Siberian larch. The northern façade consists of 4.400 m² of natural stone.

Wedged between a late Gothic church, the Antoniterkirche, and nondescript post-war concrete, it consists of two distinct parts. A rectangular block of stone takes up the rhythms of the surrounding seventies' angular forms, while the partially encircling wood-and-glass construction flows toward the church that had looked somewhat displaced previously.

Municipal regulations prevent the cupola from being accessible to the general public, but it is opened on special occasions. The department store is operated by the German chain Peek & Cloppenburg, which commissioned the Piano design, which has won several prizes.

From P&C's point of view, this is one in a series of Weltstadthäuser, each designed by a different architect: in Berlin (Gottfried Böhm), Düsseldorf (Richard Meier), Frankfurt (RKW Rhode Kellermann Wawrowsky), Cologne (Renzo Piano), Leipzig (Moore Ruble Yudell), Mannheim (Richard Meier again), Stuttgart (Josef Paul Kleihues),Vienna (David Chipperfield, completed late 2011).
