= The Kind Foundation =

Charitable trust in Christchurch, New Zealand

- Registration no.: CC32107
- Headquarters: 4 Rolleston Avenue, Christchurch
- Location: New Zealand
- Key people: Chief Executive; Josie Ogden Schroeder
- Website: thekindfoundation.org.nz

The Kind Foundation, formerly YMCA Christchurch, is a charitable trust based in Christchurch, New Zealand. Historically a local trust of the national council of the YMCA, it separated from the YMCA and rebranded to The Kind Foundation in 2023, to better reflect the communities it was serving. The trust operates community facilities and wellbeing programmes in Christchurch and the wider Canterbury region.

== History ==
The original YMCA opened in Lyttelton, New Zealand in 1862. During the 1870s and 1880s, multiple fires at YMCA offices caused the loss of all their early records. In 1884 they opened a new building at their site on the corner of Cambridge Terrace and Hereford Street, where they remain to this day.

In 2023 the YMCA Christchurch announced they would rebrand to The Kind Foundation. CEO Josie Ogden Schroeder said the rebrand was intended to better reflect the communities they serve.

== Facilities ==
=== Papa Hou ===
Opened in 2023, Papa Hou is a community facility in Central Christchurch operated by The Kind Foundation. The facility cost NZ$42,000,000 to build and was funded by central government with a combination grant-and-loan scheme, as part of the Shovel-Ready Projects initiative. The building houses community facilities such as a gym, childcare, meeting rooms, a theatre and commercial kitchens. The facility replaced the smaller YMCA building on Hereford Street, which was demolished in 2024.

The building was designed by Architectus and built by Cook Brothers construction.

=== Hotel Give ===
Originally opened in 1990 as a YMCA hostel, in 2023 the building was renovated and rebranded as the Hotel Give as part of the redevelopment of the Rolleston Avenue site and Papa Hou.

=== Wainui Park ===
The foundation operates a camp facility at Wainui on Banks Peninsula. The camp is used by schools and church youth groups, and includes a lodge with kitchen facilities, and small cabins for 107 guests.

=== Arthur's Pass Outdoor Education Centre ===
Originally constructed as a recreation hall for workers constructing the Otira Tunnel, the foundation operates a lodge in Arthur's Pass village. The lodge is used by school and church youth groups for alpine nature camps.
