= 1 Bligh Street =

Skyscraper in Sydney, New South Wales, Australia

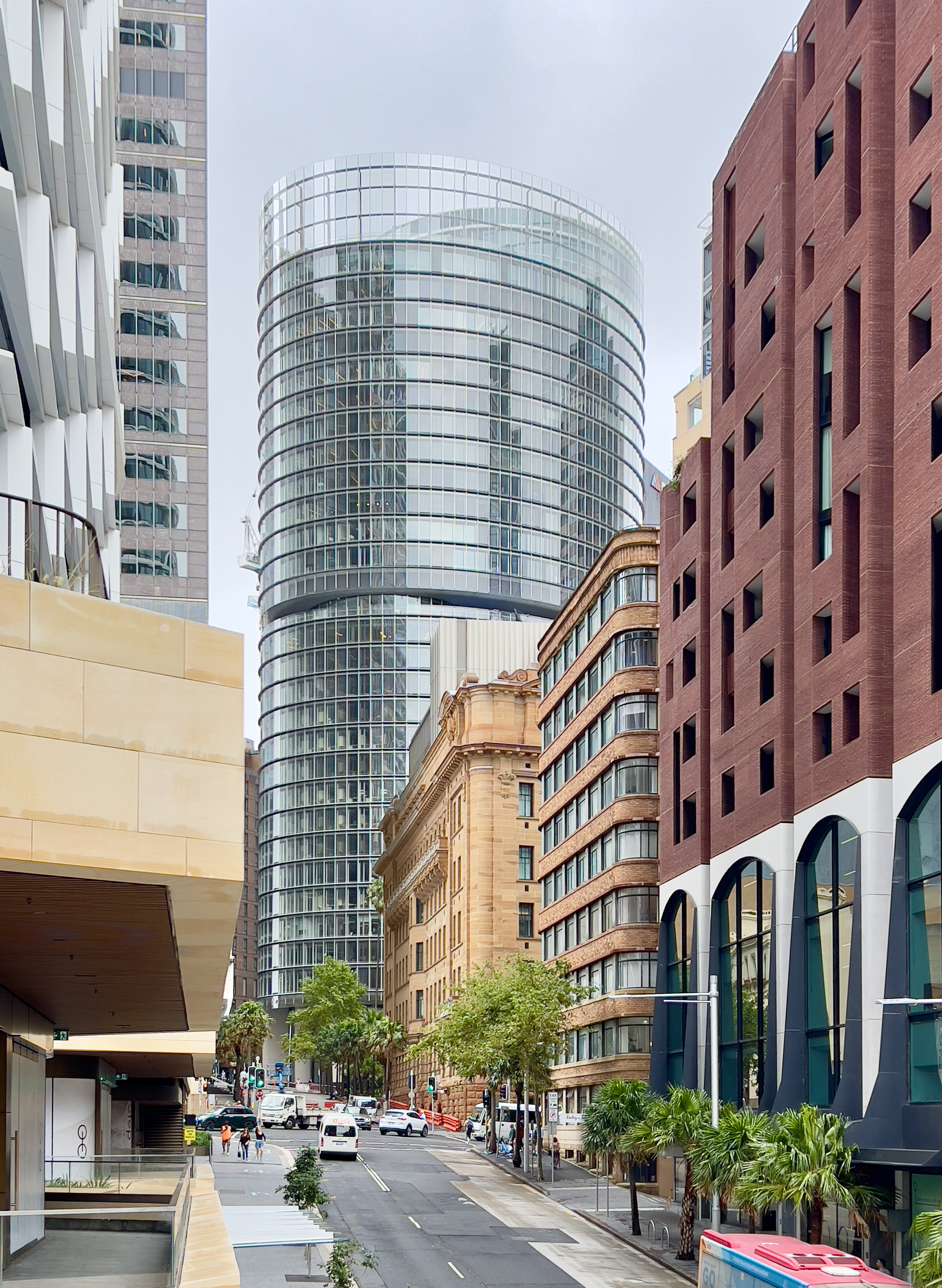
- Interactive map of the 1 Bligh Street area

General information
- Status: Completed
- Type: Commercial office building
- Location: Sydney, New South Wales, Australia
- Coordinates: 33°51′54″S 151°12′38″E
- Completed: May 2011
- Opening: August 2011
- Cost: A$270 million
- Owner: Dexus Property and the Dexus Wholesale Fund

Height
- Roof: 139 m (456 ft)

Technical details
- Floor count: 30
- Floor area: 42,700 m^{2} (460,000 sq ft)

Design and construction
- Architect: Ingenhoven in collaboration with Architectus
- Developer: Cbus Property, Dexus Property and the Dexus Wholesale Fund
- Structural engineer: Enstruct Group
- Other designers: Cundall (ESD Consultant), Arup
- Main contractor: Grocon
- Awards: International Highrise Award; 2012

Website
- www.1bligh.com.au

References
- Cbus Property

1 Bligh Street is a skyscraper in Sydney, New South Wales, Australia. The 30-storey modern style office building is located in the Sydney central business district overlooking Circular Quay, the Sydney Harbour and the Sydney Harbour Bridge.

== Design ==
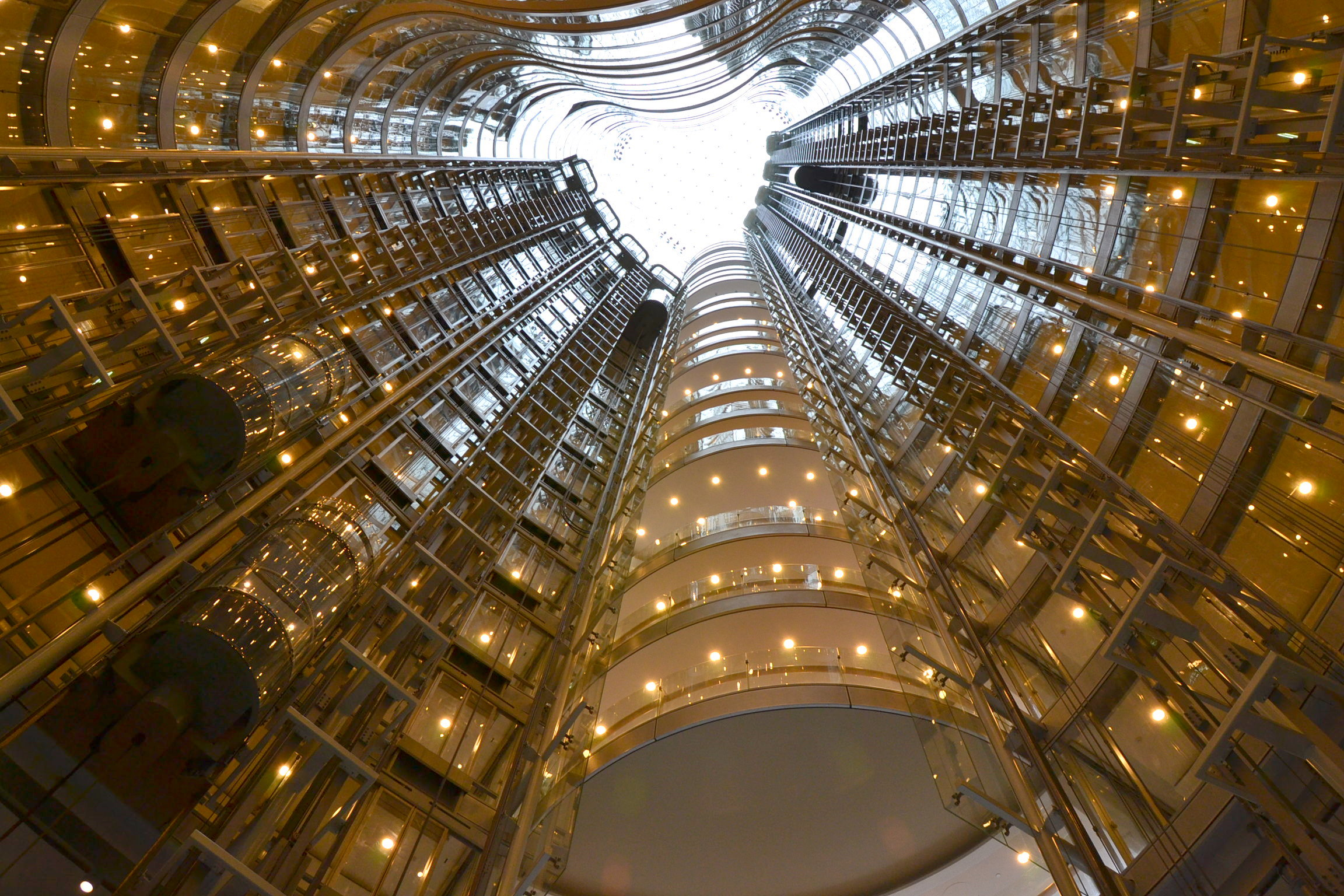
The atrium

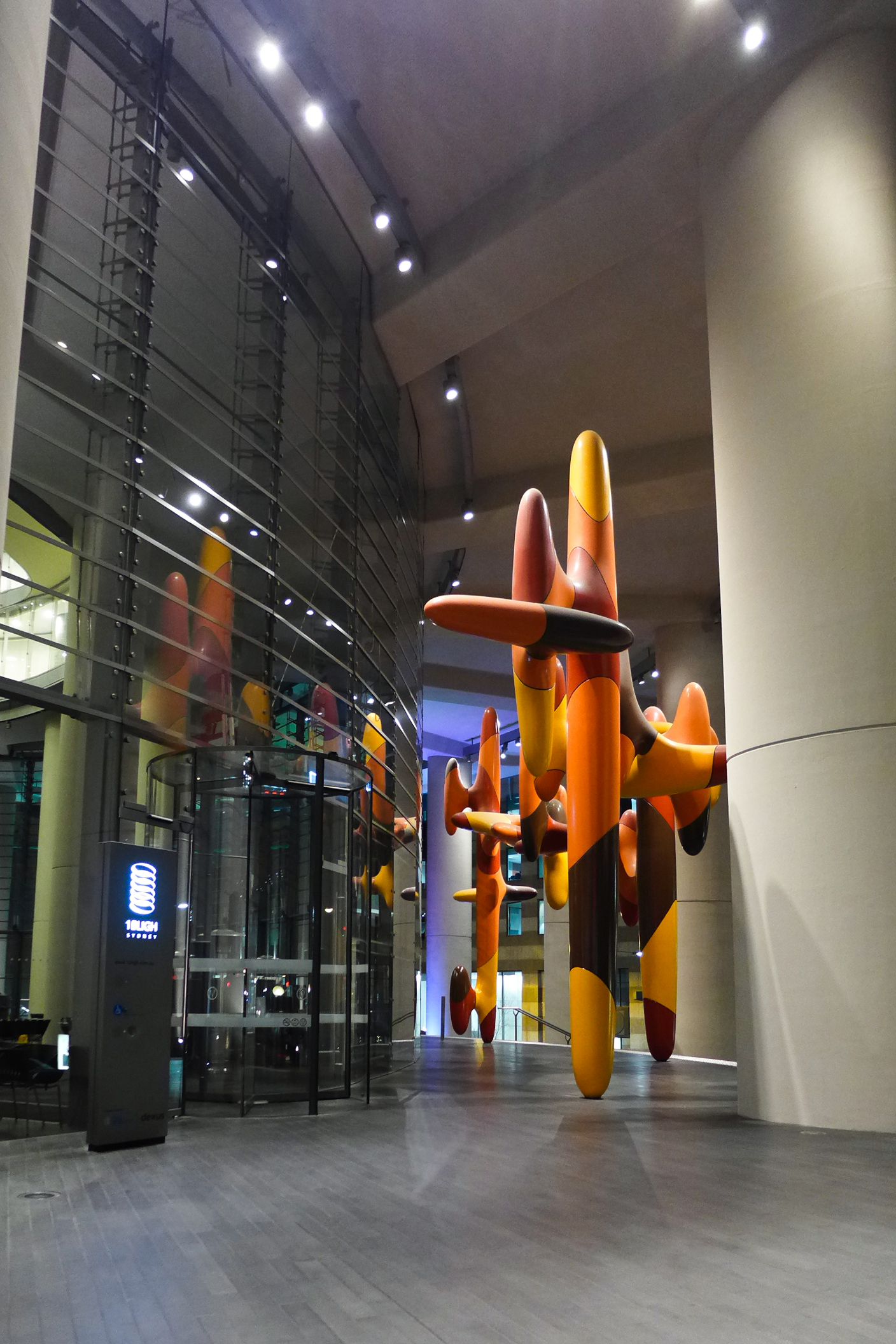
James Angus's sculpture

The premium grade office tower was designed by Ingenhoven Architects of Germany and Architectus of Australia.

It is an ecologically sustainable development and was awarded six-star green status by the Green Building Council of Australia. Green features include a basement sewage plant that recycles 90 percent of the building waste water, solar panels on the roof and air conditioning by chilled beams. It is Australia's first major high-rise building with a full double-skin façade with external louvres. These conserve energy, eliminate sky glare and optimise user comfort. The angle of the louvre blades is automatically adjusted according to their orientation to the sun. A naturally ventilated, full height (120 metres (390 ft)) atrium, on the southern side of the building, maximises natural light to each office level.

The building also houses a childcare centre, two cafés and a basement car park for 96 cars.

The large-scale aluminium sculpture at the top of the curving steps at the entrance on the corner of Bligh and O'Connell streets is by California-based Australian James Angus. The developers describe it as "a complex network of three-dimensional ellipsoidal surfaces drawn from shapes expressed in the design of the building," adding that its brightly painted colour scheme traces the underlying geometry of the sculpture.

The building was named the Best Tall Building Award in Asia & Australasia for 2012 in the Council on Tall Buildings and Urban Habitat's Skyscraper Awards, won the 2012 International Highrise Award and the 2012 Harry Seidler Award for Commercial Architecture.

== Major tenants ==
- Accor Pacific
- Bloomberg L.P.
- Clayton Utz
- Office of the Prime Minister of Australia
- Commonwealth Parliament Offices
- Oil Search
- Preqin
- Vault Systems

== See also ==
- Buildings and architecture of Sydney
- List of tallest buildings in Sydney
