= International High-Rise Award =

International architectural design award

The International High-Rise Award (German: Internationaler Hochhaus Preis) is an international award in architectural design. The award is bestowed to "a structure that combines exemplary sustainability, external shape and internal spatial quality, not to mention social aspects, to create a model design."

Initiated in 2003 by the City of Frankfurt, German Architecture Museum and DekaBank it is granted in Frankfurt am Main every two years. The prize, a statuette by artist Thomas Demand and EUR 50,000 is awarded to the planners and developers jointly.

== Recipients ==
Year	Recipients	Image
2026	ZIN, Brussels, Belgium Architects: 51N4E, l'AUC, Jaspers-Eyers Architects Developer: Befimmo	
2024	CapitaSpring, Singapore Architects: BIG, Carlo Ratti Developer: CapitaLand, Mitsubishi Estate	
2022	Quay Quarter Tower, Sydney, Australia Architects: 3XN Developer: AMP Capital	
2020	Norra Tornen, Stockholm, Sweden Architects: OMA Developer: Oscar Properties	
2018	Torre Reforma, Mexico City, Mexico; Architects: L. Benjamín Romano, Developer: Fondo Hexa	
2016	VIA 57 West, New York City, United States; Architects: Bjarke Ingels Group, Developer: The Durst Organization	
2014	Bosco Verticale, Milan, Italy; Architects: Stefano Boeri Architetti, Barreca & La Varra; Developer: Hines Italia SGR S.p.A.	
2012	1 Bligh Street, Sydney, Australia; Architects: Ingenhoven Architects, Architectus; Developer: DEXUS	
2010	The Met, Bangkok, Thailand; Architects: WOHA, Singapore, Tandem Architects, Bangkok; Client: Pebble Bay Thailand Co. Ltd., Singapore	
2008	Hearst Tower, New York City, United States; Architects: Foster and Partners, London; Client: Hearst Corporation, New York	
2006	Torre Agbar, Barcelona, Spain; Architects: Ateliers Jean Nouvel, Paris, France, with B720, Fermin Vasquez, Barcelona, Spain; Client: Layetana Developments, Barcelona, Spain	
2004	Hoftoren, The Hague, Netherlands; Architects: Kohn Pedersen Fox Associates PA, London; Developer: ING Vastgoed, The Hague	

== Bibliography ==
- Michaela Busenkell (Hrsg.), Peter Cachola Schmal (Hrsg.): Best Highrises 2012/2013: Internationaler Hochhauspreis / The International Highrise Award 2012. Katalog zur Ausstellung im Deutschen Architekturmuseum Frankfurt am Main vom 17. November 2012 bis 13. Januar 2013. Edition Detail, München 2012, ISBN 978-3-920034-70-6.
