= Schildergasse =

Coordinates: 50°56′11″N 6°57′9″E

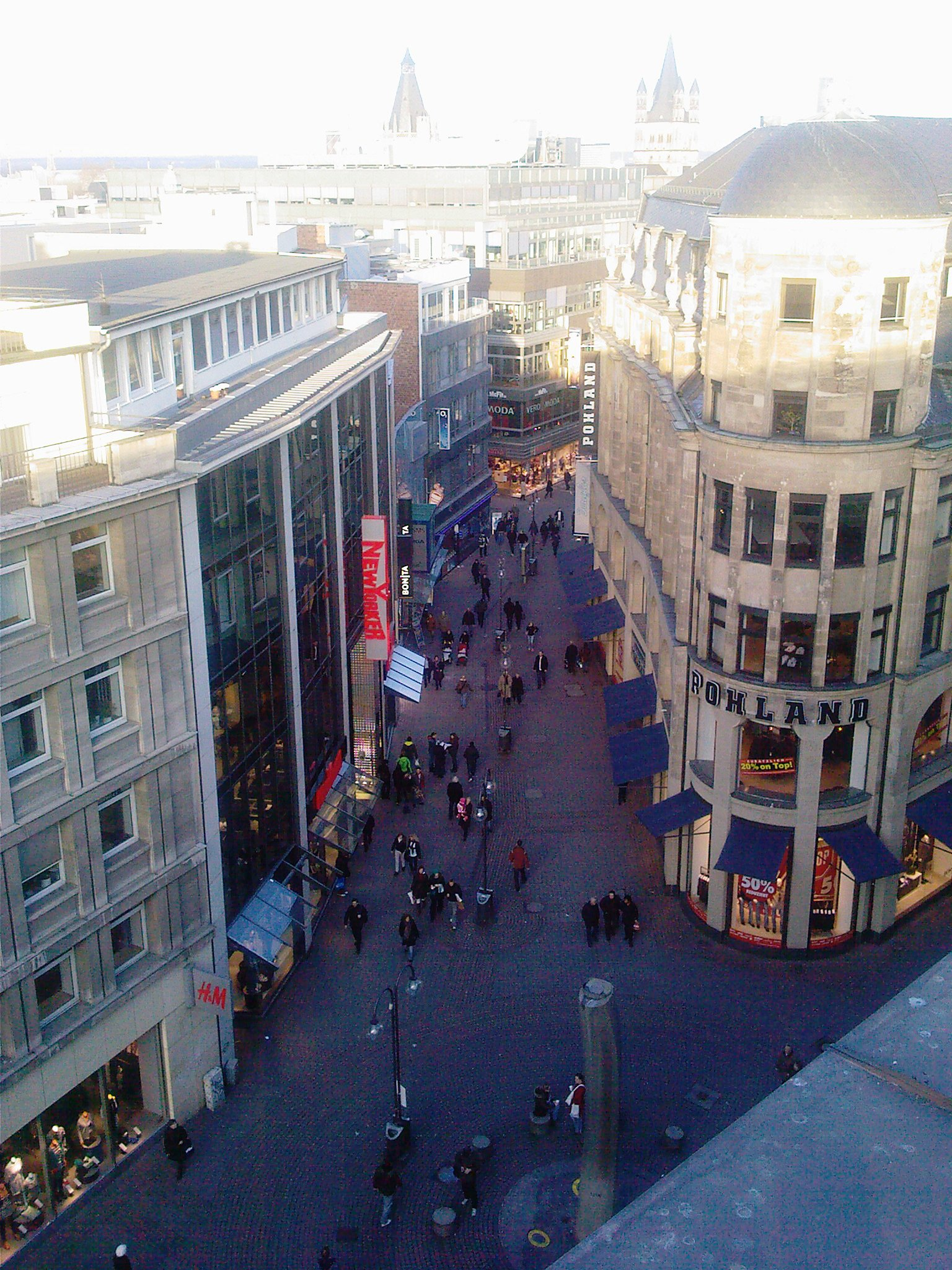
Schildergasse as seen from the rooftop of Galeria Kaufhof

The Schildergasse (German: [ˈʃɪldɐˌɡasə]; Kölsch: Schelderjaß [ˌʃéldɐˈjâs]) is a shopping street in central Cologne, Germany. With 13,000 people passing through it every hour, it is the busiest shopping street in Europe, according to a 2008 survey by GfK. The Schildergasse is a designated pedestrian zone and stretches for about 500 meters from the Hohe Straße at its eastern end to the Neumarkt at the western end.

The street dates back to Roman times, when it was the city's Decumanus Maximus. During the Middle Ages it was home to many artists who painted heraldic coats of arms, whence the street's name (Schilder means signs or escutcheons). Among today's landmarks on Schildergasse are the Atoniterkirche, the oldest Protestant church in Cologne, and Peek & Cloppenburg's Weltstadthaus, designed by Renzo Piano.

== Nearby places of interest ==
- Käthe Kollwitz Museum
- Rautenstrauch Joest Museum
- Schnütgen Museum
- Church of St. Cäcilien Basilica

== See also ==
- List of streets in Cologne
- List of leading shopping streets and districts by city
