= Peek & Cloppenburg =

German fashion store chain

Peek & Cloppenburg KG Düsseldorf
- Type: Kommanditgesellschaft
- Industry: Retail
- Founded: 20 April 1900 in Düsseldorf
- Headquarters: Düsseldorf, Germany
- Key people: Harro Uwe Cloppenburg, Patrick Cloppenburg, John Cloppenburg, Uwe Fehr, Aribert Müller, Roland Schick, Engelbert Thulfaut, Dr. Horst Clemens, Wolfgang Sauerzapf
- Products: Clothing
- Number of employees: 13,700 throughout Europe
- Website: peek-cloppenburg.com

Peek & Cloppenburg KG Hamburg
- Type: Kommanditgesellschaft
- Industry: Retail
- Founded: Netherlands 1886
- Headquarters: Hamburg, Germany
- Products: Clothing
- Website: peek-und-cloppenburg.de

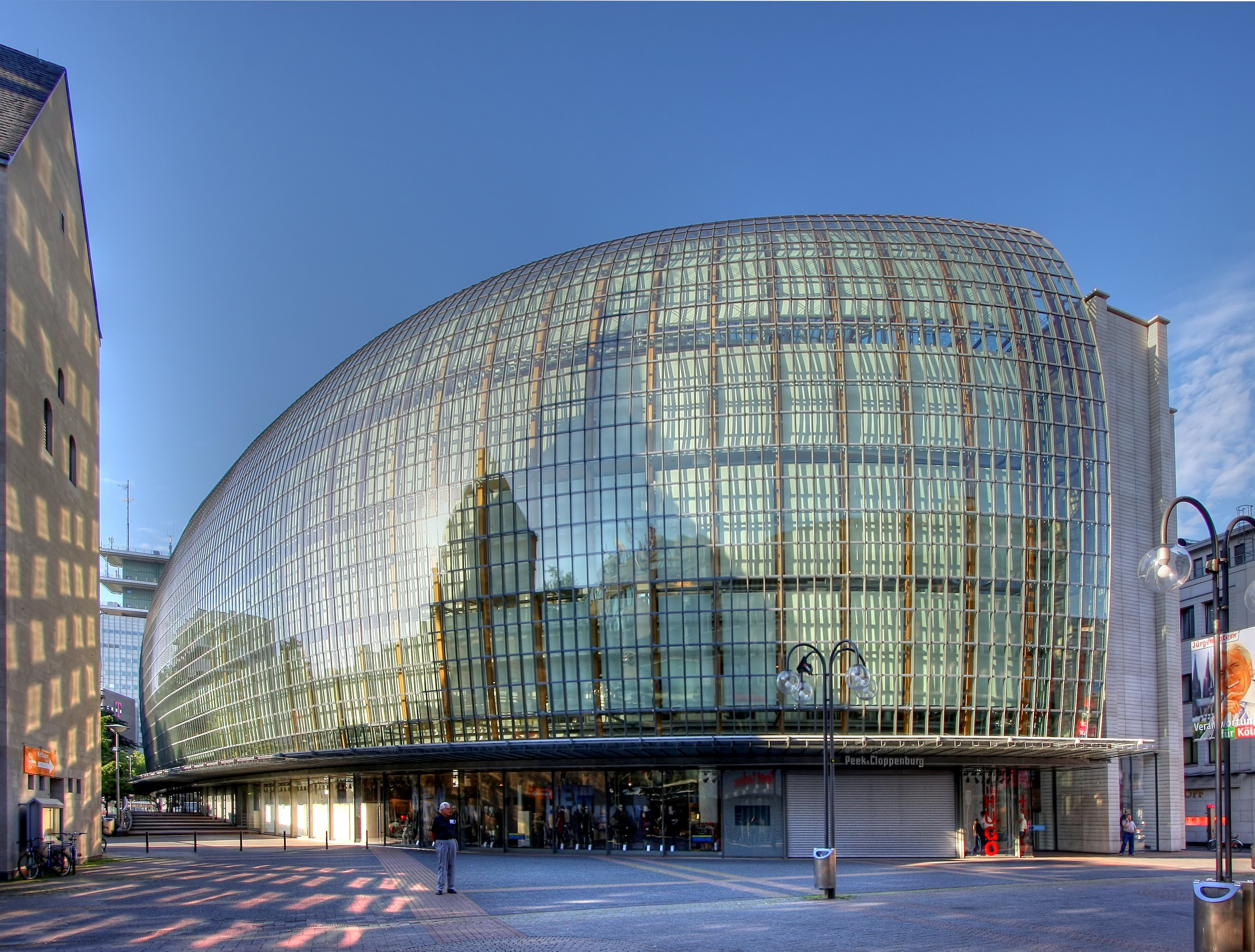
Metropolitan Store Cologne, Schildergasse

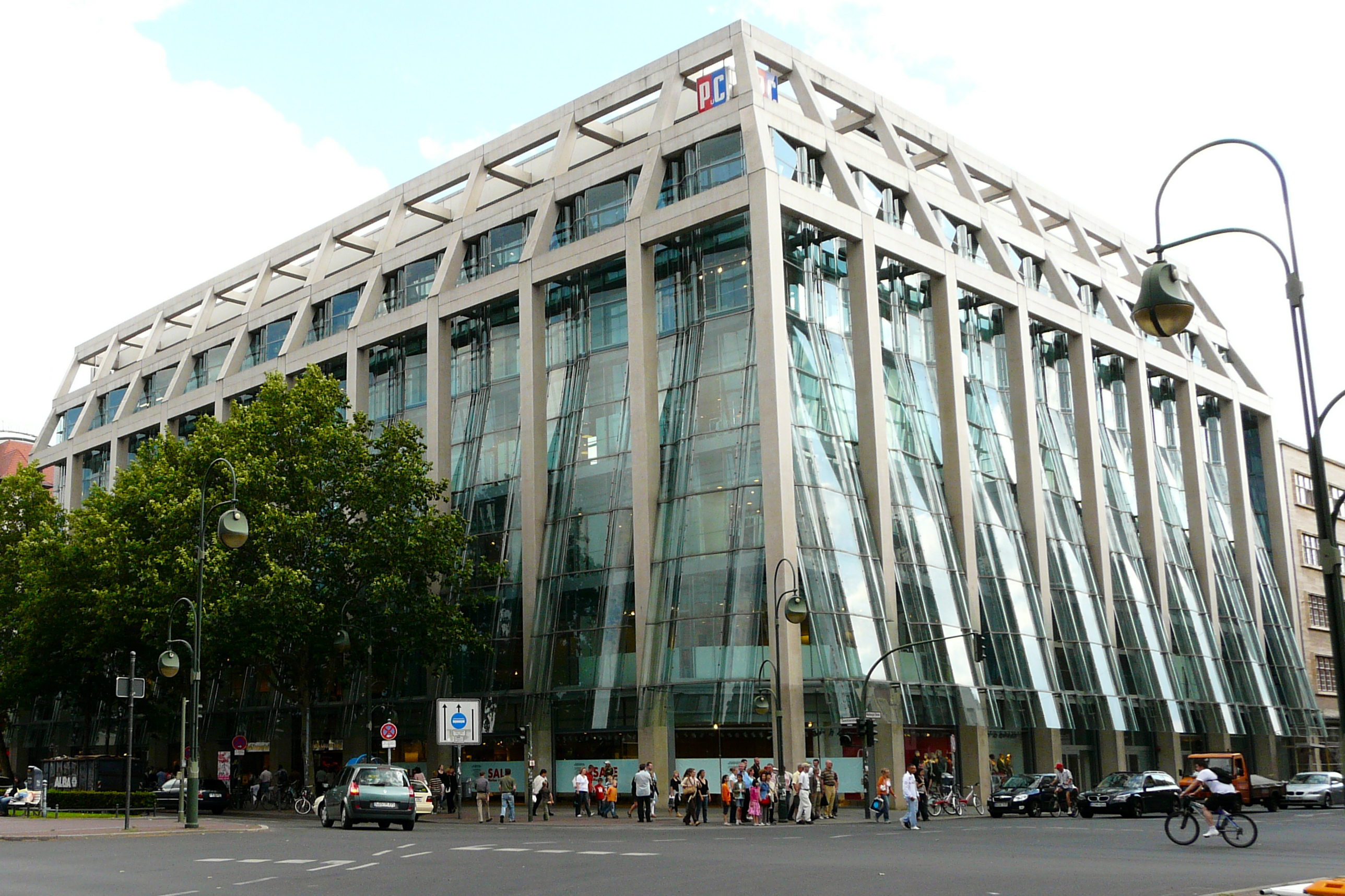
Metropolitan Store Berlin, Tauentzienstraße

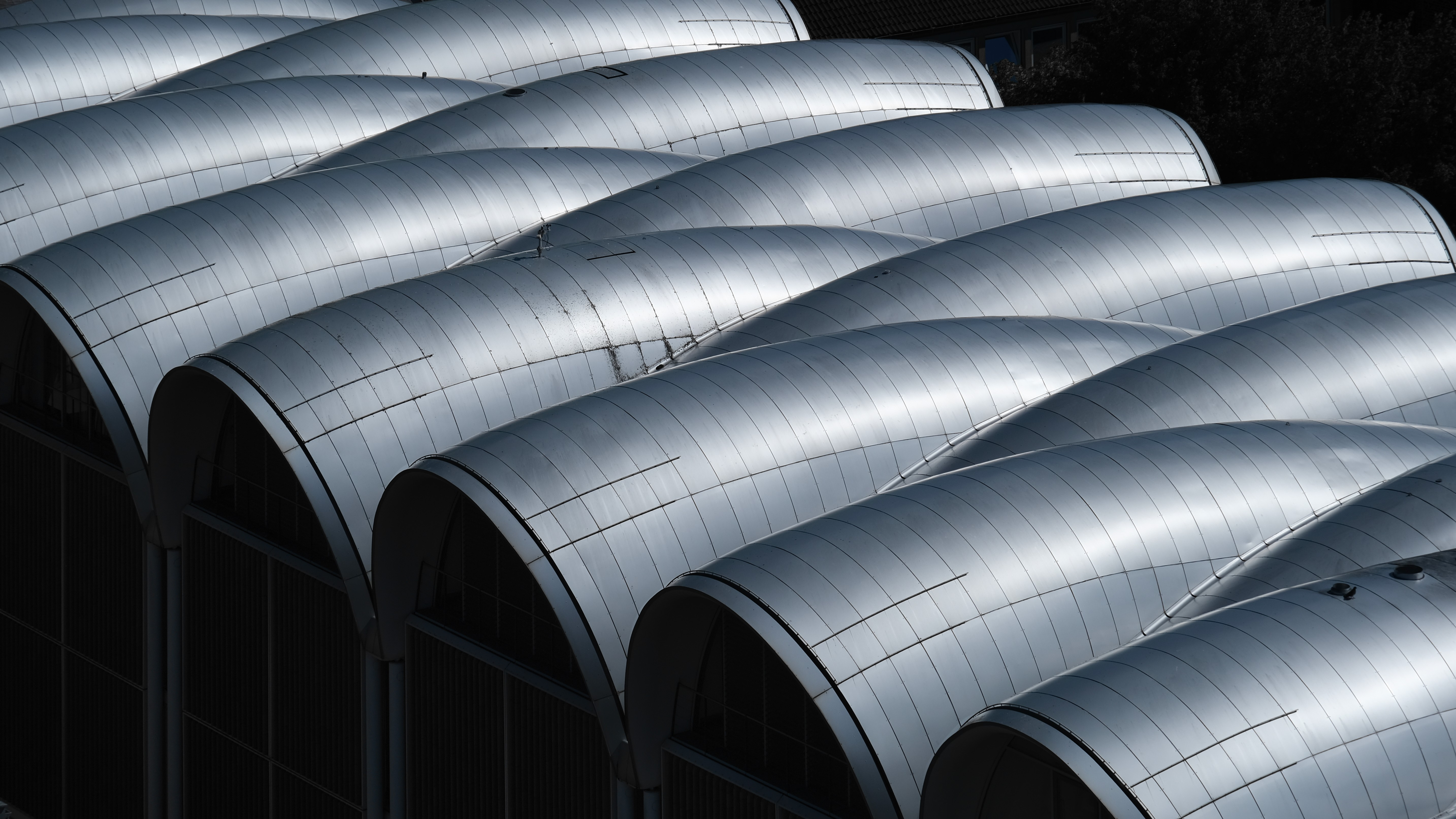
P&C in Lübeck by architect Christoph Ingenhoven

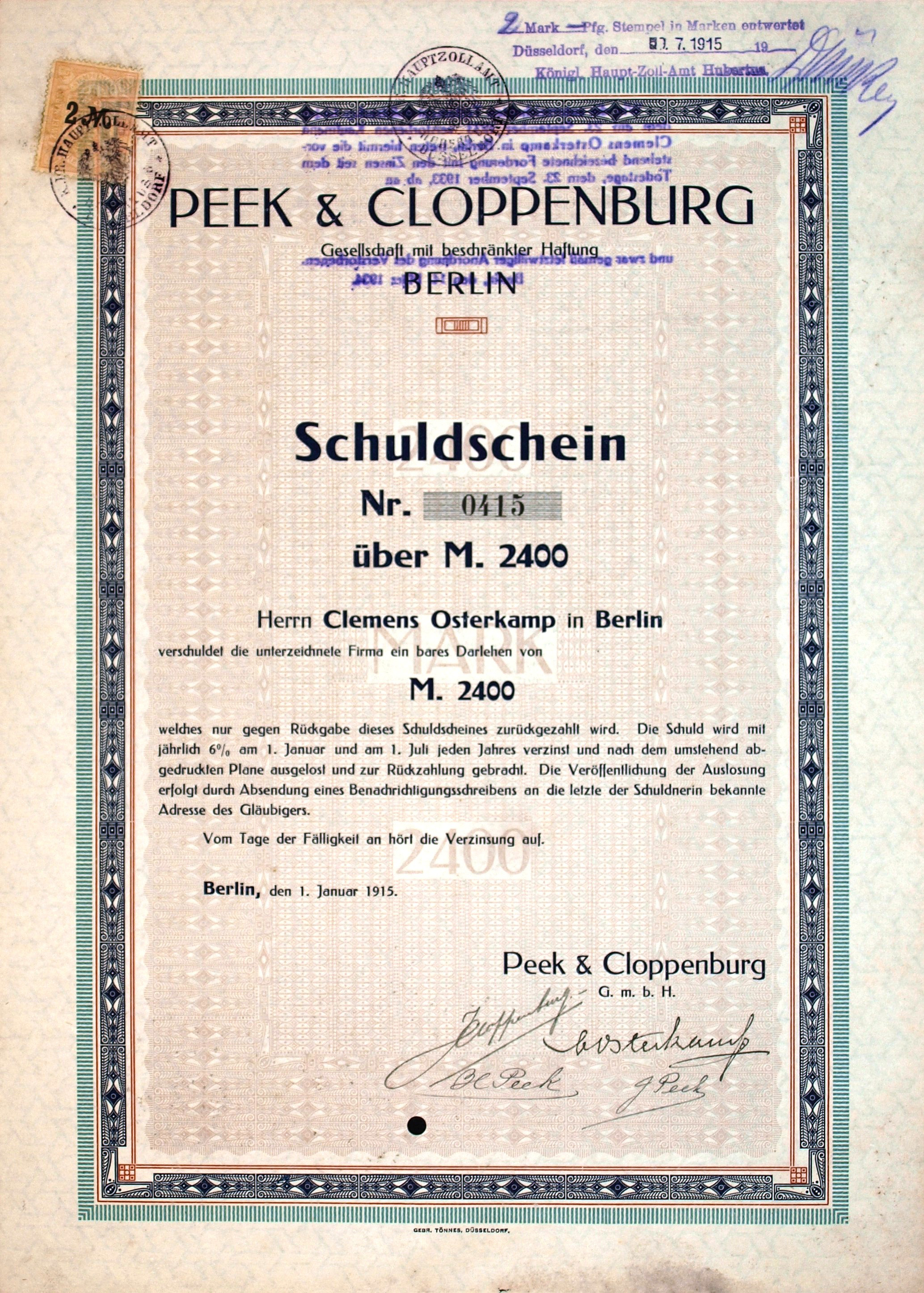
Debenture of the Peek & Cloppenburg GmbH, issued 1. January 1915

Peek & Cloppenburg is an international chain of fashion and clothing stores from Germany. The chain is operated by two separate and independent companies, Peek & Cloppenburg KG Düsseldorf (known as P&C West) and Peek & Cloppenburg KG Hamburg (known as P&C North).

== History ==
Peek & Cloppenburg has its origins in the relationship between Johann Theodor Peek (1845–1907) and Heinrich Anton Adolph Cloppenburg (1844–1922), both from the Cloppenburg area of Lower Saxony, Grand Duchy of Oldenburg, now part of Germany. In or before 1868 the men met as trainees at manufacturing companies in Zwolle and Rotterdam in the Netherlands where they visited clients in surrounding villages.

In 1869 they established a business together in Rotterdam.

A second store was opened the following year in Utrecht. Both men moved to Düsseldorf in Germany and on 20 April 1900, they founded "Peek et Cloppenburg GmbH" in that city. A short time after the company was formed they opened their first store in the center of Düsseldorf. James Cloppenburg, son of founder Anton Adolph Cloppenburg, opened the company's second store in 1901 in Berlin. Barely 20 years after the founding of the trading house in Rotterdam, there were already branches in Amsterdam, The Hague, Breda, Leeuwarden, Groningen, Haarlem, Leiden and Utrecht.

=== Foundation in Germany ===
Peek & Cloppenburg was founded in Düsseldorf in March 1901. This was followed in the same year by the opening of the first sales outlet in Düsseldorf at Schadowstrasse 31–33. To mark the company's 100th birthday, a new building designed by the New York architect Richard Meier was opened on this site with a sales area of around 14,200 square metres. Like all buildings by Richard Meier, this building also bears a white façade.

A short time later, also in 1901, James Cloppenburg, the son of Heinrich Cloppenburg and son-in-law of Johann Theodor Peek, opened the second German sales house in Berlin at Gertraudenstrasse, corner Roßstrasse 26–27. This was initially independent; the Peek family was not involved. Later (in 1911 at the latest) he brought the Berlin house into his father's company and took over the management of the entire firm.

Peek & Cloppenburg introduced the uniform size system in menswear as a novelty in its first two shops.

== Internationally ==
The two independent Peek & Cloppenburg partnerships trade in 15 countries in Europe.

=== Peek & Cloppenburg Düsseldorf ===
Peek & Cloppenburg KG Düsseldorf runs two stores in Belgium, five in the Netherlands, and two in Switzerland, in addition to its 67 stores in Germany. A subsidiary company, Peek & Cloppenburg KG Wien (Vienna), runs 43 stores in Austria, Bulgaria, Croatia, the Czech Republic, Hungary, Latvia, Lithuania, Poland, Romania, Slovakia, Serbia and Slovenia.

=== Magasin du Nord ===
In May 2021, Peek & Cloppenburg acquired Danish department store chain Magasin du Nord from British retailer Debenhams in a £120 million deal.

== Brands ==
- Both Peek & Cloppenburg Düsseldorf and Peek & Cloppenburg Hamburg sell designer and own-brand fashion for men, women, teens, and children.
- The brands McNeal (men's fashion) and Review (young fashion for men and women) have ties to the Cloppenburg family of Peek & Cloppenburg KG Düsseldorf. The two sub-brands are also sold outside of P&C in competitors' stores and have their own shops in Austria, Croatia, and Germany.

== Logo ==
The Peek & Cloppenburg logo consists of a shield with the white letters "P" and "C" on it. The shield is divided into two colours. The left side is dark red and the right side is dark blue.

- Peek & Cloppenburg Hamburg has a white "&"-sign between the two letters.
- Peek & Cloppenburg Düsseldorf has a white small letter "u" for the word "und" (meaning and) between the two letters.

== Facts ==
One son of founder Cloppenburg, James Cloppenburg (1877–1926), entered the business in 1901 and opened the second store in Berlin, Germany. The other (younger) son, Anton Cloppenburg, married the daughter of founder Johann Theodor Peek, Marie Peek (1879–1937) in 1901. Ten years later Anton Cloppenburg founded a separate private partnership of Peek & Cloppenburg in Hamburg in 1911. From this date, the Cloppenburg family was divided into the companies operating under the same name.
