= European Prize for Architecture =

- First award: 2010
- Website: Official Site

The European Prize for Architecture is an architecture prize awarded annually by the European Centre for Architecture Art Design and Urban Studies and Chicago Athenaeum: Museum of Architecture. It was established by Christian Narkiewicz-Laine, the Finnish-Lithuanian-American architect, design critic, artist, poet, and museum chief of the Chicago Athenaeum.

The Prize, according to Narkiewicz-Laine, "was established to continue and celebrate Europe’s ongoing contribution to world history and culture and to encourage our present generation of practitioners to embrace the true art of architecture together with its humanistic and social pursuits in order to make our European cities and nations true centers of advanced culture and civilization." "Throughout the centuries", Mr. Narkiewicz-Laine adds, "Europe has given the world its most important practitioners from Phidias, Vitriuvius, Michelangelo, da Vinci, and Palladio to the early modern masters, Le Corbusier, Alvar Aalto, Walter Gropius, and Eliel and Eero Saarinen. Those architects have developed numerous philosophies and visionary approaches to building, engineering, and planning that have grown from the need to invent or express a time and place in Europe’s rich history. Classicism, Byzantine, Gothic, Renaissance, Baroque, Beaux-Arts, Constructivism, Art Deco, DeStijl, and Modernism have all resulted as an expression of clearly stated European values and ideals and have given form and shape to the most famous cities in the world."

== Recipients ==
Year	Recipient	Country
2010	Bjarke Ingels	Denmark
2011	Graft architects	Germany
2012	TYIN Tegnestue	Norway
2013	Marco Casagrande	Finland
2014	Alessandro Mendini	Italy
2015	Santiago Calatrava	Spain
2016	Laboratory for Visionary Architecture	Germany
2017	Manuelle Gautrand	France
2018	Sergei Tchoban	Germany Russia
2019	Henning Larsen Architects	Denmark
2020	Wolfgang Tschapeller	Austria
2021	MECANOO	Netherlands
2022	Christoph Ingenhoven	Germany
2023	Querkraft architekten	Austria

== Host cities ==
Each year's results are announced during a ceremony that is hosted in a different European or South or North American city each time. So far, the European Prize for Architecture ceremonies (and accompanying events) have been hosted by:

Year	City	Country
2010	Madrid	Spain
2011	Buenos Aires	Argentina
2012	Istanbul	Turkey
2013	Buenos Aires	Argentina
2014	Milan	Italy
2015	New York City	United States
2022	Athens	Greece

== See also ==
- Good Design
- List of architecture prizes
