= RWE Tower =

High-rise office building in Essen, Germany, Evonik headquarters

Evonik Tower
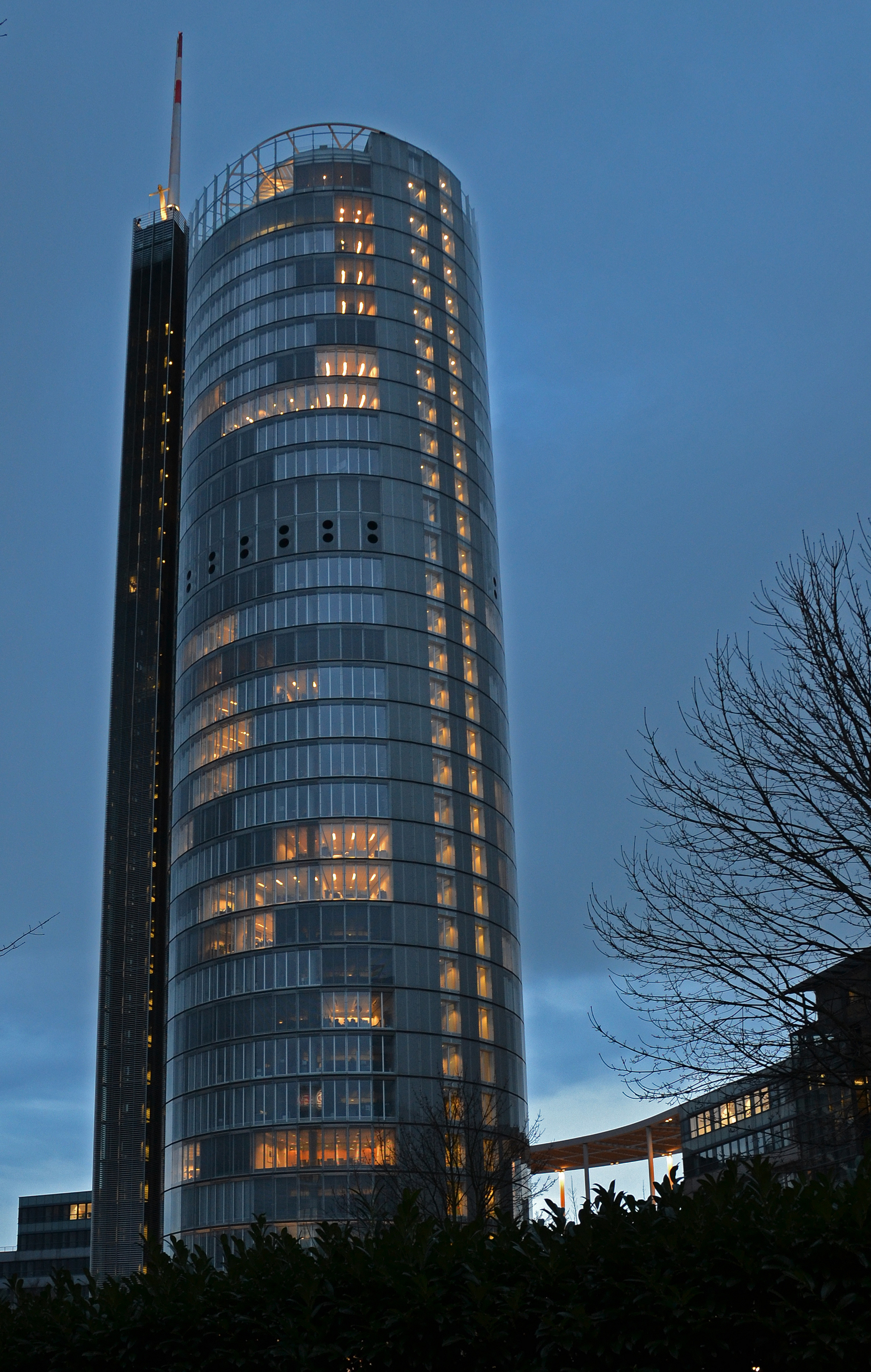
- Evonik Tower Essen
- Interactive map of the Evonik Tower area

General information
- Type: Office
- Location: Essen, Northrhine-Westphalia Germany
- Coordinates: 51°26′53″N 7°00′51″E
- Completed: 1996

Height
- Antenna spire: 162.7 m (534 ft)
- Roof: 127 m (417 ft)
- Top floor: 30

Technical details
- Floor count: 29
- Floor area: about 250,000 sq ft (23,000 m^{2})

Design and construction
- Architect: Ingenhoven Overdiek Kahlen & Partner
- Structural engineer: Buro Happold

The Evonik Tower in Essen is the highest building in the Ruhr area, and one of the highest buildings in Germany. It was tenanted by RWE and known as RWE-Turm and is now tenated by Evonik Industries (from July 1, 2026). As it shows the cultural and industrial change of the region, it is an important landmark in Essen. The skyscraper was designed by Ingenhoven Architects.
