= Architectus =

Architectural firm based in Australia and New Zealand

Practice information
- Firm type: Architecture; Interior architecture; Landscape architecture; Urban design; Urban planning; Wayfinding
- No. of employees: 800
- Location: Adelaide, Auckland, Brisbane, Canberra, Christchurch, Gold Coast, Melbourne, Newcastle, Sydney, Perth, Townsville

Website
- architectus.co.nzarchitectus.com.au

Architectus is a multi-disciplinary architecture and design practice with 13 studios across Australia and Aotearoa / New Zealand.

As the largest practice in their region, they employ more than 800 architects, interior designers, landscape architects, urban planners, urban designers, digital experts, and wayfinding specialists, who collaborate on projects of every type and size.

The firm works across a diverse range of sectors including Commercial, Defence, Infrastructure, Public and Transport, with Education and Health their two largest teams.

== Major architectural works ==
Architectus has designed some of Australasia's landmark buildings including the following projects:

Completed	Project name	Image	Location	Award	Notes
2002	AMI Stadium: South, West and East Stands		Christchurch	NZIA-Resene Supreme Award (2003: West Stand); NZIA Public Architecture Award (2010: East Stand)	
2006	Gallery of Modern Art, Brisbane		Brisbane, Queensland	RAIA Award for Public Architecture (2007)	
2006	University of the Sunshine Coast, Chancellery building		Sunshine Coast, Queensland		
2009	Saint Kentigern School Jubilee Sports Centre		Auckland, New Zealand	NZIA New Zealand Architecture Award – Public Architecture 2011; NZIA Auckland Architecture Award – Public Architecture 2009	
2010	New Lynn Transit Oriented Development		Auckland, New Zealand		
2011	Melbourne Airport International Terminal Expansion		Melbourne, Victoria		
2011	1 Bligh Street		Sydney CBD	International High Rise Award (2012); Chicago Athenaeum International Architecture Award (2008); Council on Tall Buildings and Urban Habitat's Skyscraper Award (2012); RAIA Sir Arthur G. Stephenson Award (2012); RAIA Milo Dunphy Award (2012); RAIA Urban Design (2012)	
2012	Queen Elizabeth II Courts of Law, Brisbane		Brisbane, Queensland	Australian Institute of Architects (AIA), National Award for Public Architecture, 2013; AIA (QLD) Awards, Award for Public Architecture, 2013; Master Builders Queensland Construction Awards, Award for Innovation in Environmental Management, 2012	
2014	Gold Coast Rapid Transit		Gold Coast, Queensland		
2014	St Cuthbert's College Centennial Centre for Wellbeing		St Cuthbert's College, Epsom, Auckland	2016 NZIA New Zealand Architecture Award – Education	
2015	Christchurch Bus Interchange/Whakawhitinga Pahi		Christchurch, New Zealand	2016 NZIA New Zealand Architecture Award – Public; 2016 NZIA Canterbury Architecture Award – Public	
2016	Number 5 House		Waiheke, Auckland, New Zealand	2016 NZIA New Zealand Architecture Award – Housing; 2016 NZIA Auckland Architecture Award – Housing	
2016	Augusta Building, Auckland Grammar School		Epsom, Auckland, New Zealand	2016 NZIA Auckland Architecture Award – Education	
2017	Macquarie University Incubator		Macquarie Park, New South Wales	Australian Institute of Architects (AIA), National Architecture Award, 2018; AIA, National Sustainability Awards, Education and Research, 2018; The Chicago Athenaeum Museum, International Architecture Award, 2018; AIA (NSW), William E Kemp Award for Educational Architecture, 2018; INDE.Awards, The Learning Space, 2018	
2018	St Andrew's College Centennial Chapel		Ōtautahi Christchurch	NZIA John Scott Award for Public Architecture 2018; NZIA New Zealand Architecture Award - Public, 2018	
2018	Barrack Place		Sydney, New South Wales	PCA Innovation and Excellence Awards: Rider Levett Bucknall Development of the Year Award, 2020; Colliers International Award for Best Office Development, 2020; Landcom Award for Best Sustainable Development, 2020; NSW State Development of the Year Award, 2020; Urban Land Institute (ULI) Asia Pacific Award for Excellence, 2019 Australian Institute of Architects (AIA) (NSW) City of Sydney Lord Mayor’s Prize, 2019 AIA (NSW) Commercial Architecture Commendation, 2019	
2019	State Library Victoria 2020 redevelopment (with Schmidt Hammer Lassen)		Melbourne, Victoria	Property Council of Australia (PCA) National Innovation and Excellence Awards: Best Public Heritage Development, 2021; Best Public Building, 2021; Melbourne Awards, Urban Design Award, 2021 Victorian Premier’s Design Award, Architectural Design Award, 2021 Australian Library Design Awards, National Exemplar Award, 2021 American Institute of Architects, International Region Design Awards: Open International Architecture Merit Award, 2020; Sustainable Future Award, 2020; Australian Institute of Architects (AIA) National Awards, Commendation for Public Architecture, 2020 AIA (VIC) Awards: The Melbourne Prize, 2020; Public Architecture Award, 2020; Heritage – Conservation Award, 2020	
2022	Eromanga Natural History Museum		Eromanga, Queensland	Australian Institute of Architects (QLD) Awards, Public Architecture Commendation, 2024; Darling Downs – West Moreton Regional Architecture Awards, People’s Choice Award, 2024	
2022	The Clendon Centre, Loreto Mandeville Hall		Toorak, Victoria	Australian Institute of Architects (VIC) Awards, Henry Bastow Award for Educational Architecture, 2022	
2022	Art Gallery of NSW, Naala Badu Building (Sydney Modern), in association with SANAA		Sydney, New South Wales	National Architecture Awards, National Award (Public), 2023; Australian Institute of Architects (NSW) Awards, The Sulman Award for Public Architecture (2023); Australian Interior Design Awards, Public Design, 2023; Australian Interior Design Awards, Best of State Commercial Design (NSW), 2023	
2018	St Andrew's College Centennial Chapel, St Andrew's College		Christchurch, New Zealand	2018 NZIA John Scott Award for Public Architecture	
2024	Flinders University Health and Medical Research Building		Bedford Park, South Australia	Australian Institute of Architecture (SA) Awards: South Australian Architecture Medal, 2025; The Dr John Mayfield Award for Educational Architecture, 2025; The Robert Dickson Award for Interior Architecture, 2025; Award for Sustainable Architecture, 2025; Lab Design Excellence Awards, Excellence in Interior Design, 2025 Zak Award for Excellence in Excellence in Facade Design - Architect, 2025	
2024	United Nations Africa Hall Redevelopment		Addis Ababa, Ethiopia	World Monuments Fund / Knoll Modernism Prize, 2026; Chicago Athenaeum International Architecture Awards, Restoration/Renovation Award, 2025	
2024	Macquarie Group Global Headquarters		Sydney, New South Wales	Australian Good Design Awards, Good Design Award® for Interior Design, 2025; Better Future World Design Awards, Gold Award for Interior Design – Corporate, 2026; Better Future Australian Design Awards, Gold Award for Interior Design – Corporate, 2026; Better Future Sydney Design Awards,Gold Award for Interior Design – Corporate, 2025; Master Builders Association of NSW Excellence in Construction Awards,Award for Interior Fitouts – $100 Million+ (led by Lendlease), 2025	
2025	University of New South Wales Health Translation Hub		Randwick, New South Wales	European Healthcare Design Awards, High Commendation in Design for Health and Life Sciences, 2026	
2026	Peninsula University Hospital, in association with Bates Smart		Frankston, Victoria	INDE Awards, the Health + Wellbeing Space (with Bates Smart), 2026	

== Data ==
Metric	2014	2015	2016	2017	2018	2019	2020	2021
Female Employees (as a % of total)	-	-	-	-	-	45.7	43.4	41.1
Male Employees (as a % of total)	-	-	-	-	-	54.7	56.6	58.9

== See also ==
- Architecture of Australia
- Architecture of New Zealand
