= RWTH Aachen Faculty of Architecture =

Architecture school at RWTH Aachen University

The Faculty of Architecture is one of nine faculties at the RWTH Aachen University. It comprises 22 chairs and institutes including art history, structural design or load carrying construction. The Faculty was found in 1880. Approximately 1,500 students are enrolled in the faculty.

== Degrees awarded ==
The following Degrees are awarded in architecture, urban management, art history or building history:

- Bachelor of Science
- Master of Science
- Diplom
- Magister
- Doctor
