= Marina One =

Mixed-use development in Singapore

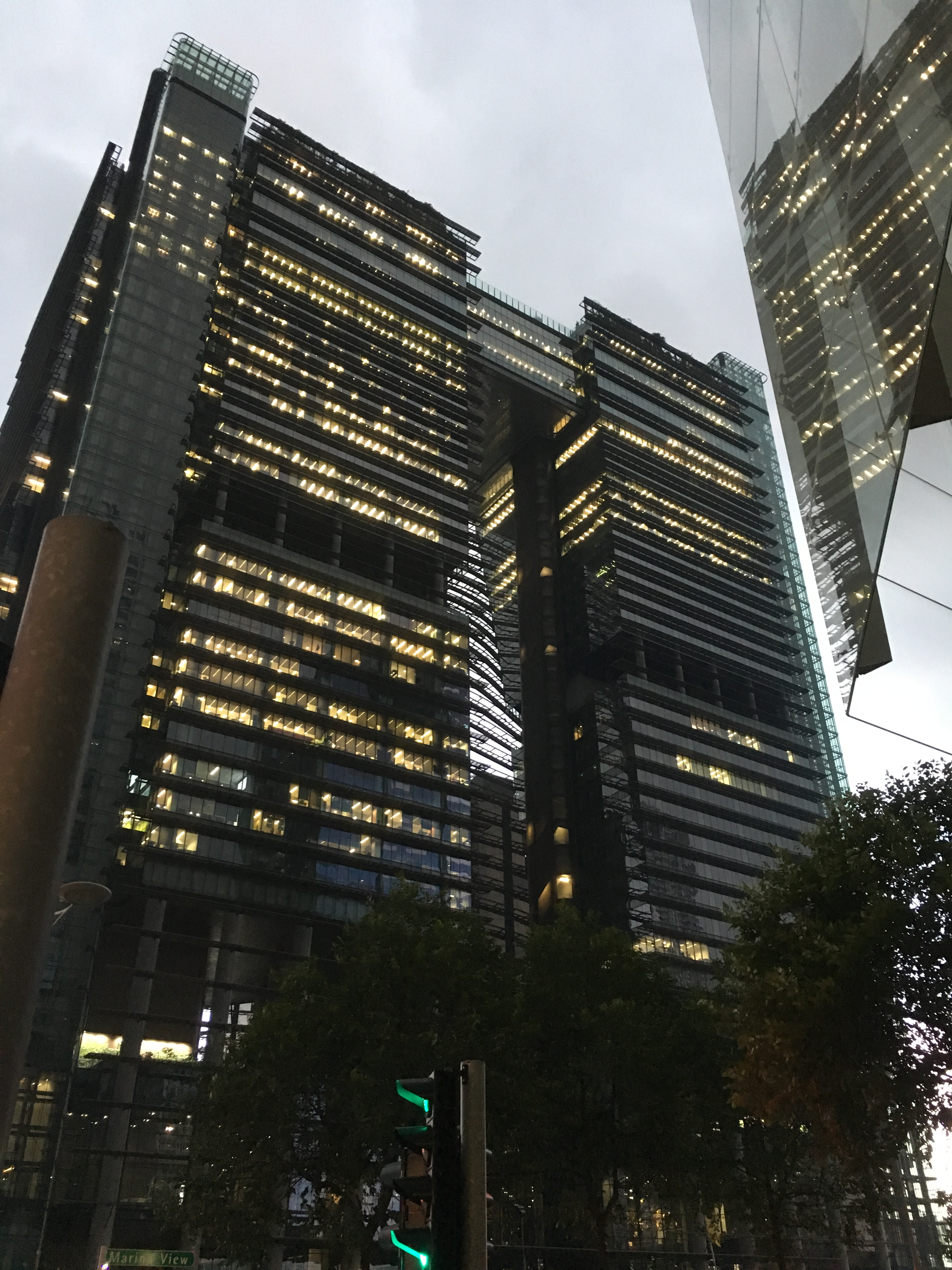
- Marina One in 2018

General information
- Status: Completed
- Type: Integrated development: residential, offices, retail
- Architectural style: Neofuturistic
- Location: 7 Straits View, Singapore 018936 (Marina One East Tower); 9 Straits View, Singapore 018937 (Marina One West Tower); 21/23 Marina Way, Singapore 018978/018979 (Marina One Residences); 5 Straits View, Singapore 018935 (The Heart), Singapore
- Coordinates: 1°16′39″N 103°51′9″E

Technical details
- Floor count: Marina One Residences: 34; Marina One East Tower and Marina One West Tower: 30

Design and construction
- Architect: Ingenhoven Architects
- Developer: M+S; UEM Sunrise (Project manager); Mapletree Investments (Project manager)
- Engineer: Beca Group

Other information
- Public transit: TE19 Shenton Way; DT17 Downtown; NS27 CC33 TE20 Marina Bay

Website
- www.marinaone.com.sg

Marina One is a mixed-use development bounded by Marina Way and Straits View in Marina South located within the Downtown Core of the city-state of Singapore.

Designed by Christoph Ingenhoven, Marina One covers a total gross floor area of approximately 3.67 million square feet. It includes two 34-storey residential towers, two 30-storey prime grade A office towers and a retail podium named 'The Heart', featuring lush greenery and landscaping by Gustafson Porter and ICN Design. Both were landscape architects behind Singapore's Gardens by the Bay, also located in Marina South.

It was developed by M+S Pte Ltd, a 60:40 joint venture between Investment fund Khazanah National and Singapore's investment company Temasek Holdings. Wholly owned subsidiaries of the two funds - Mapletree Investments and UEM Sunrise were appointed project managers.

The development broke ground on 11 July 2012 followed by the unveiling of Marina One's architectural design on 19 February 2013. It was inaugurated on 15 January 2018.

== History ==
Marina One was designed by Ingenhoven Architects. A Korean consortium of Hyundai Engineering & Construction and GS Engineering and Construction were appointed main contractors for on 5 September 2013.

Other companies involved include Architects61, Beca Carter Hollings & Ferner, Langdon & Seah, Gustafson Porter, ICN Design and Arup.

=== Unveiling ceremony ===
The design of Marina One was unveiled on 19 February 2013.

At the ceremony, the project was described as "an iconic building" which would be positioned "in an unprecedented scale on the world map as a new financial centre."

=== Groundbreaking ceremony ===
Members of the M+S Board broke ground on Marina One on 11 July 2012. Speaking at the ceremony, the chairman of M+S revealed that the development would "define new standards of luxury urban living in Singapore, creating a benchmark for international excellence in design and sustainability" in line with the Urban Redevelopment Authority's (URA) long-term vision for Marina South as a growth area in establishing a global business and financial hub.

== Green Heart ==
An estimated net floor area of 140,000 square feet retail podium in the centre of Marina One offers gastronomic and lifestyle options. The centerpiece of Green Heart will be a biodiversity garden designed and developed by Kathryn Gustafson of Gustafson Porter + Bowman. The Heart was envisaged by Christoph Ingenhoven as a sanctuary and a green civic space for communities to come together at the heart of Singapore's CBD. It will feature an array of lush greenery at the centre of the development comprising waterfalls and rooftop gardens.

Marina One was set to bring Singapore's 'City in a Garden' concept with a unique garden ecosystem within the development, providing a sanctuary and green space for communities amid the hustle and bustle of the CBD.

== Marina One Residences ==
Marina One Residences is the residential component of Marina One totalling an estimated 1.23 million square feet and comprises 1,042 apartment units over two 34-storey residential towers. The units range from one to four bedroom units and penthouses.

Marina One Residences feature a 65,000 sq. ft "Green Heart" enclave that features a 50m lap pool, a gymnasium, private dining rooms, and Teppanyaki terrances.

== Marina One Offices ==
Marina One Offices comprises two 30-storey prime Grade A commercial towers, Marina One East Tower and Marina One West Tower, with an estimated net floor area of 1.88 million square feet.

Located in Marina South, the commercial tower features two high-density 100,000 square feet net floor plates – the largest in Asia. Current tenants include Prudential, MUFG Bank and PwC Singapore.

== Marina One Retail ==
Restaurant and retail tenants at Marina One include

- 1855 The Bottle Shop
- 7-Eleven
- Arcade Fish Soup
- Cold Storage
- Standing Sushi Bar
- Fun Toast
- Starbucks

== Awards ==
Marina One has received three awards at the Asia Pacific Property Awards 2012 for Best High Rise Architecture, Best Mixed-use Architecture and Best Mixed-use Development.

The development also received recognition for its sustainable and environmentally friendly design:

- BCA Green Mark Platinum Rating for Marina One Residences
- BCA Green Mark Platinum Rating for Marina One East Tower and Marina One West Tower
- LEED Platinum pre-certified for Marina One East Tower and Marina One West Tower

Other awards include:

- FIABCI World Prix d'Excellence Awards 2020 – World Gold Winner of the Sustainable Development Category
- FIABCI-Singapore – Singapore Property Awards 2018 – Winner, Sustainable Development Category
- Singapore Excellence Awards 2018 – Marina One Residences, Top Development Excellence
- MIPIM Awards 2018 – Best Innovative Green Building
- CTBUH Awards 2018 – Award of Excellence, Best Tall Building Asia & Australasia
- LEED Platinum certified – Marina One East and West Tower
- Gold Award for Commercial and Industrial Landscape at the Singapore Landscape Architecture Awards 2019 SLAA 2019

M+S awards

- EdgeProp Singapore Excellence Awards 2018 – M+S Pte. Ltd., Top Developer

== Transportation ==
Marina One is connected with the Marina Coastal Expressway. It is connected to four out of Singapore's six MRT lines via:

- Marina Bay MRT station on the North South Line, Circle Line and Thomson–East Coast Line
- Downtown MRT station on the Downtown Line
- Shenton Way MRT station on the Thomson–East Coast Line
