= Double-skin facade =

Type of building facade

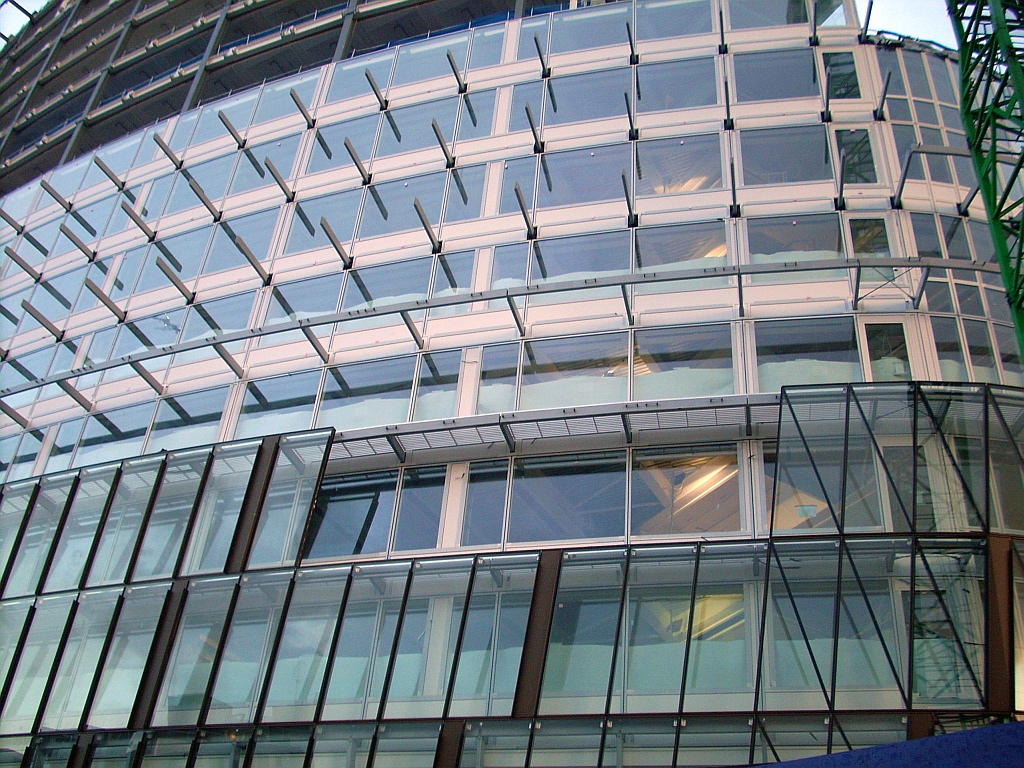
A Waagner-Biro double-skin facade being assembled at One Angel Square, Manchester. The brown outer facade can be seen being assembled to the inner white facade via struts. These struts create a walkway between both 'skins' for ventilation, solar shading and maintenance.

The double-skin façade is a system of building consisting of two skins, or façades, placed in such a way that air flows in the intermediate cavity. The ventilation of the cavity can be natural, fan supported or mechanical. Apart from the type of the ventilation inside the cavity, the origin and destination of the air can differ depending mostly on climatic conditions, the use, the location, the occupational hours of the building and the HVAC strategy.

The glass skins can be single or double glazing units with a distance from 20 cm up to 2 metres. Often, for protection and heat extraction reasons during the cooling period, solar shading devices are placed inside the cavity.

== History ==
The essential concept of the double-skin facade was first explored and tested by the Swiss-French architect Le Corbusier in the early 20th century. His idea, which he called mur neutralisant (neutralizing wall), involved the insertion of heating/cooling pipes between large layers of glass. Such a system was employed in his Villa Schwob (La Chaux-de-Fonds, Switzerland, 1916), and proposed for several other projects, including the League of Nations competition (1927), Centrosoyuz building (Moscow, 1928–33), and Cité du Refuge (Paris, 1930). American engineers studying the system in 1930 informed Le Corbusier that it would use much more energy than a conventional air system, but Harvey Bryan later concluded Le Corbusier's idea had merit if it included solar heating.

Another early experiment was the 1937 Alfred Loomis house by architect William Lescaze in Tuxedo Park, NY. This house included "an elaborate double envelope" with a 2-foot-deep air space conditioned by a separate system from the house itself. The object was to maintain high humidity levels inside.

One of the first modern examples to be constructed was the Occidental Chemical Building (Niagara Falls, New York, 1980) by Cannon Design. This building, essentially a glass cube, included a 4-feet-deep cavity between glass layers to pre-heat air in winter.

The recent resurgence of efficient building design has renewed interest in this concept. Since the USGBC rewards points for reduction in energy consumption vs. a base case, this strategy has been used to optimize energy performance of buildings.

== Examples ==
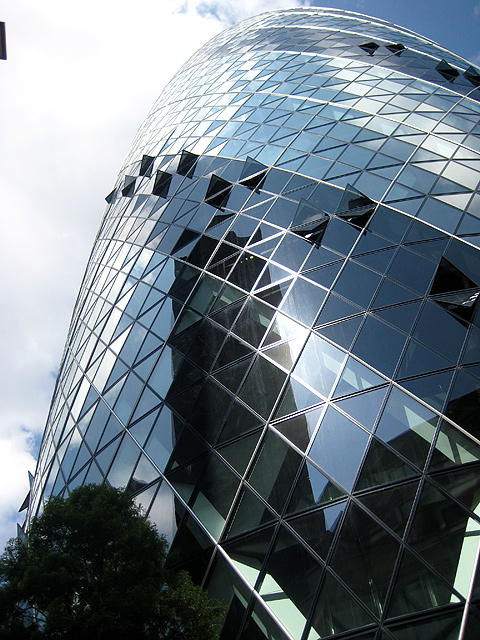
The Gherkin in London. Windows open on the outer skin to allow air to enter the cavity between the inner and outer skin.

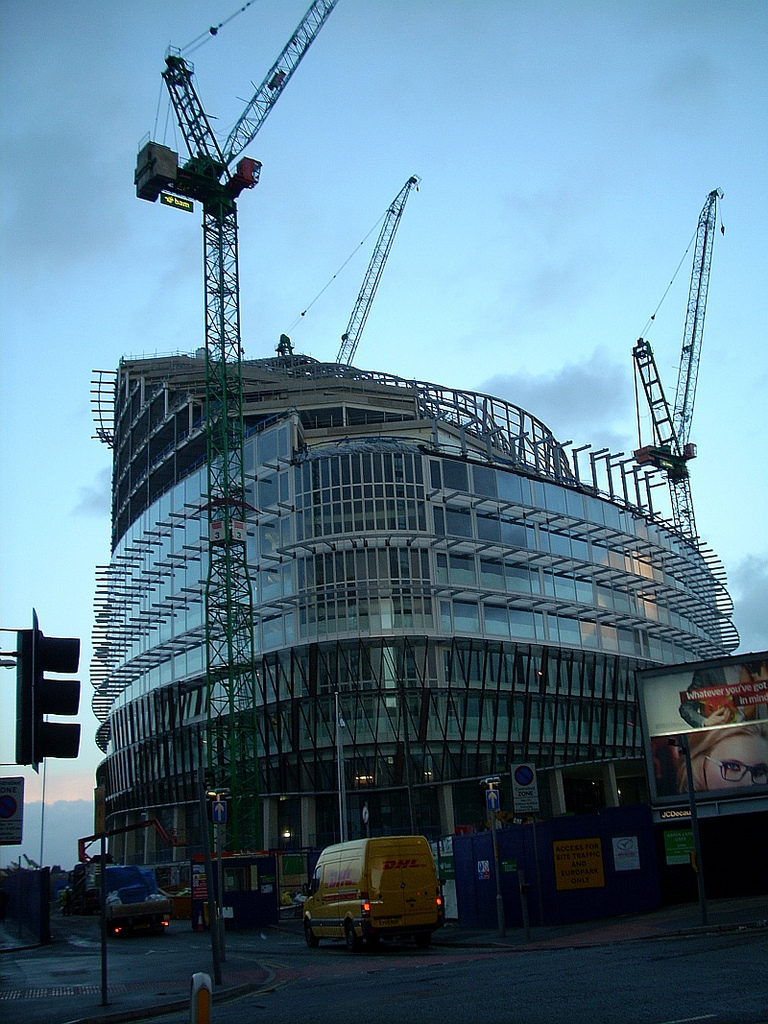
One Angel Square in Manchester. The use of a double skin is evident in construction.

Examples of notable buildings which utilise a double-skin facade are 30 St Mary Axe (also known as The Gherkin) and 1 Angel Square. Both of these buildings achieve great environmental credentials for their size, with the benefits of a double skin key to this. The Gherkin features triangular windows on the outer skin which skelter up the skyscraper. These windows open according to weather and building data, allowing more or less air to cross flow through the building for ventilation.

== Technical details ==
The cavity between the two skins may be either naturally or mechanically ventilated. In cool climates the solar gain within the cavity may be circulated to the occupied space to offset heating requirements, while in hot climates the cavity may be vented out of the building to mitigate solar gain and decrease the cooling load. In each case the assumption is that a higher insulative value may be achieved by using this glazing configuration versus a conventional glazing configuration.

Recent studies showed that the energy performance of a building connected to a double-skin facade can be improved both in the cold and the warm season or in cold and warm climates by optimizing the ventilation strategy of the facade.

== Criticisms ==
The advantages of double-skin facades over conventional single skin facades are not clear-cut; similar insulative values may be obtained using conventional high performance, low-e windows. The cavity results in a decrease in usable floor space, and depending on the strategy for ventilating the cavity, it may have problems with condensation, becoming soiled or introducing outside noise. The construction of a second skin may also present a significant increase in materials and design costs.

Building energy modelling of double-skin facades is inherently more difficult because of varying heat transfer properties within the cavity, making the modeling of energy performance and the prediction of savings debatable.

== See also ==
- Climate-adaptive building shell
- Rainscreen
