= China World Trade Center =

Complex of buildings in Beijing, China

- 中国国际贸易中心

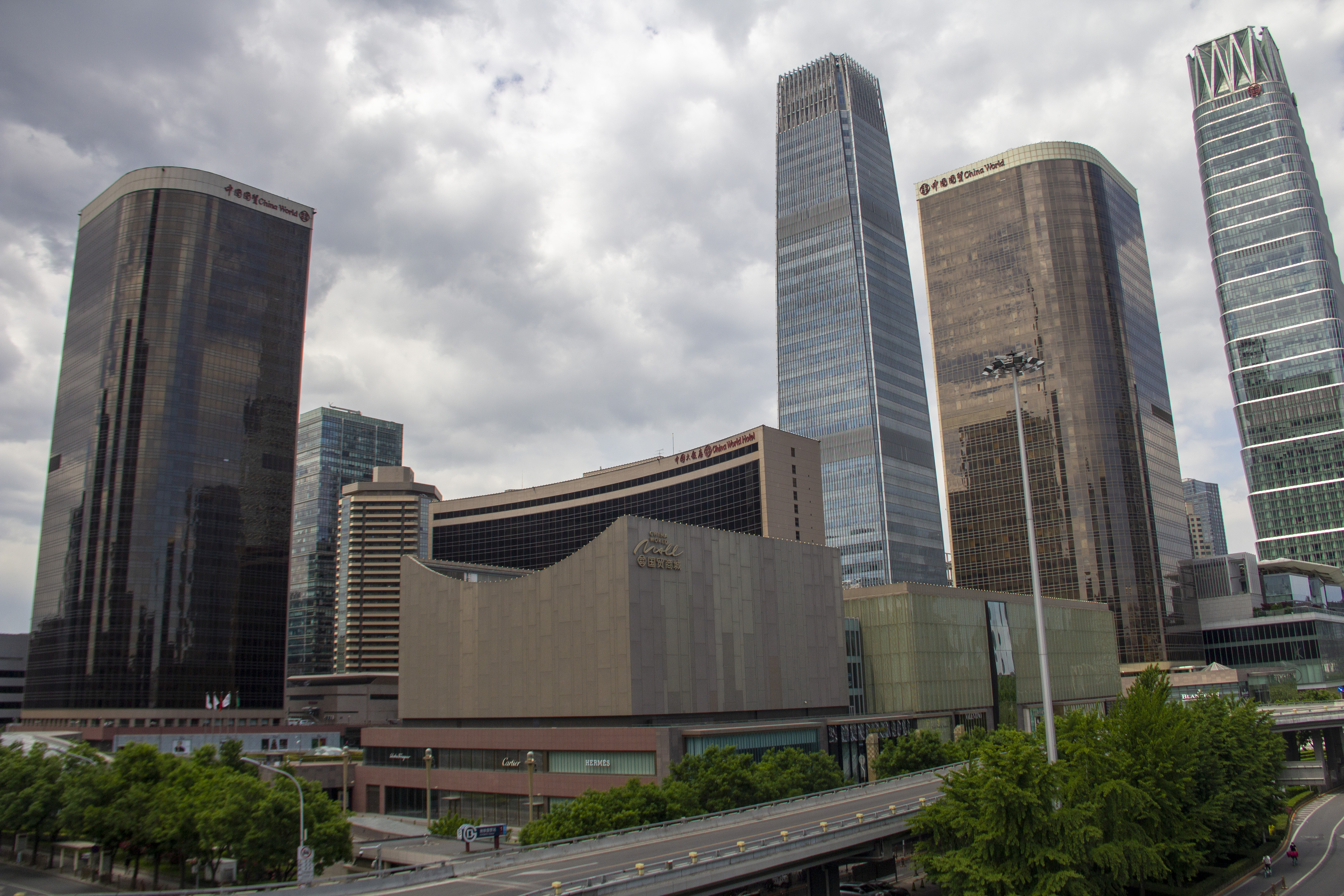

- Location within Beijing Location within Beijing

Record height
- Tallest in China World Trade Center Tower 3 until 330 m^{[I]}

General information
- Status: Completed
- Type: Building Complex
- Location: Guomao, No.1 Jianguomen Outer Street, Chaoyang District, Beijing, China
- Coordinates: 39.909°N 116.453°E
- Construction started: February 2002
- Completed: August 30, 2010
- Opened: 30 August 1990 (officially)
- Owner: Kuok Group

Height
- Height: 330 metres (1,080 ft)

Technical details
- Floor count: 79
- Floor area: 1,100,000 m^{2}

Design and construction
- Architects: Phase 1 and 2: Robert Sobel/Emery Roth & Sons, Nikken Sekkei (associate); Phase 3: Skidmore, Owings and Merrill
- Structural engineer: Arup

Other information
- Number of rooms: 1591
- Parking: 3000

Website
- China World Mall official website

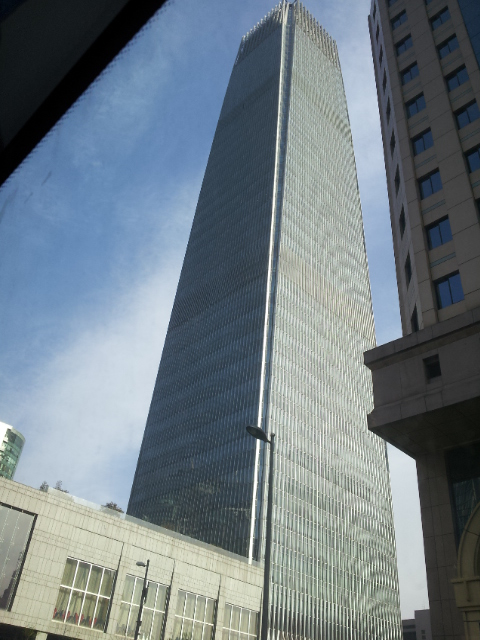
China World Trade Building viewed from Silk Market carpark

The China World Trade Center (simplified Chinese: 中国国际贸易中心; traditional Chinese: 中國國際貿易中心; pinyin: Zhōngguó guójì màoyì zhōngxīn) is located in Chaoyang District, the central business district of Beijing.

The construction of the complex started in 1985 and was completed in 2010 after the completion of the China World Trade Center Tower 3. China World Trade Center is a subsidiary group of the Kuok group founded in 1985 and owned by two cooperating companies: the China Shi Mao Investment and Kerry Industrial Company. The China World Trade Center is the largest building complex of Beijing consisting of around 14 components including hotels all of Shangri-La, shopping malls, offices, apartments, convention rooms, and an exhibition hall. It can be located in the Beijing central business district in Guomao. China World Trade Center is well known for being the largest upmarket commercial mixed-use site in the world and for keeping its reputation as an internationally friendly community. It is widely reputed as "The Place Where China Meets The World". China World Trade Center has won many awards and achievements over the past few years. One of their most notable buildings, the China World Trade Center Tower 3, is the second tallest building in Beijing and reaches up to 330 m.

Though it officially opened on 30 August 1990, it was already filling tenants by 1989. Phase 1 of construction was completed in 1990. Phase 2 was completed in 1999, and Phase 3 started in 2005. Phase 3A was completed in August 2010. The original construction was designed by architects Robert Sobel/Emery Roth & Sons with associate architect Nikken Sekkei. Phase 3 was designed by architects Skidmore, Owings and Merrill.

== Components ==
The China World Trade Center has several components with three skyscrapers and 6 main parts.

=== China World Hotel ===
China World Hotel, Beijing is a 5 star Shangri-La hotel built in 1989. It is located in the central part of the China World Trade Center and is connected to the China World Mall. The hotel is an important asset of China World Trade Center and has won many awards since its remodel in 2003. China World Hotel has 716 hotel rooms, 12 function rooms, a conference hall, banquet room and many other services and facilities. China World Hotel has won 10 Diamond Awards for its reputable restaurant chefs and lodging quality.

=== China World Summit Wing ===
China World Summit Wing is the newest part of China World Trade Center that started in 2002 and was completed in 2010. Summit Wing is a 5 star hotel located in the upper section of the China World Trade Center Tower 3. The Summit Wing has 278 hotel rooms and 8 different notable restaurants. The tower is a 330 m high and is the tallest skyscraper within Beijing.

=== Traders Hotel Beijing ===
Traders Hotel is a 4 star hotel that is mainly known for a convenient stay for business and travelers. The Traders Hotel has a total of 570 hotel rooms and 13 function rooms.

=== China World Apartments ===
The China World Apartments consist of two 30-storey towers both built in 1989. They are the North Lodge and the South Lodge towers, which are connected by a lobby section. There are overall 410 units that range from 70 m^{2} to 228 m^{2}.

=== China World Mall ===
The China World Mall was one of the first malls in China that sold branded goods - when it opened, the Chinese retail market was very small. It was originally the China World Shopping Arcade in 1990. However, it changed after an expansion during 1997. In May 2000 it opened as the 'China World Mall.' The China World Mall is overall 100,000 m^{2} and holds over 300 specialty shops. The China World Mall also has an ice rink of 800 m^{2} known as Le Cool Ice Rink. The shopping mall has 4 floors overall, including 2 basement floors, a ground floor and a second floor. The ground and second floors has offices and branded fashion shops. Basement 1 also sells branded goods as well as lifestyle, furniture, household items, sports goods, cosmetics, books, jewelry, grocery and children toys. Basement 2 is the food and entertainment area. There are several restaurants, an international food court and the ice rink in the second basement.

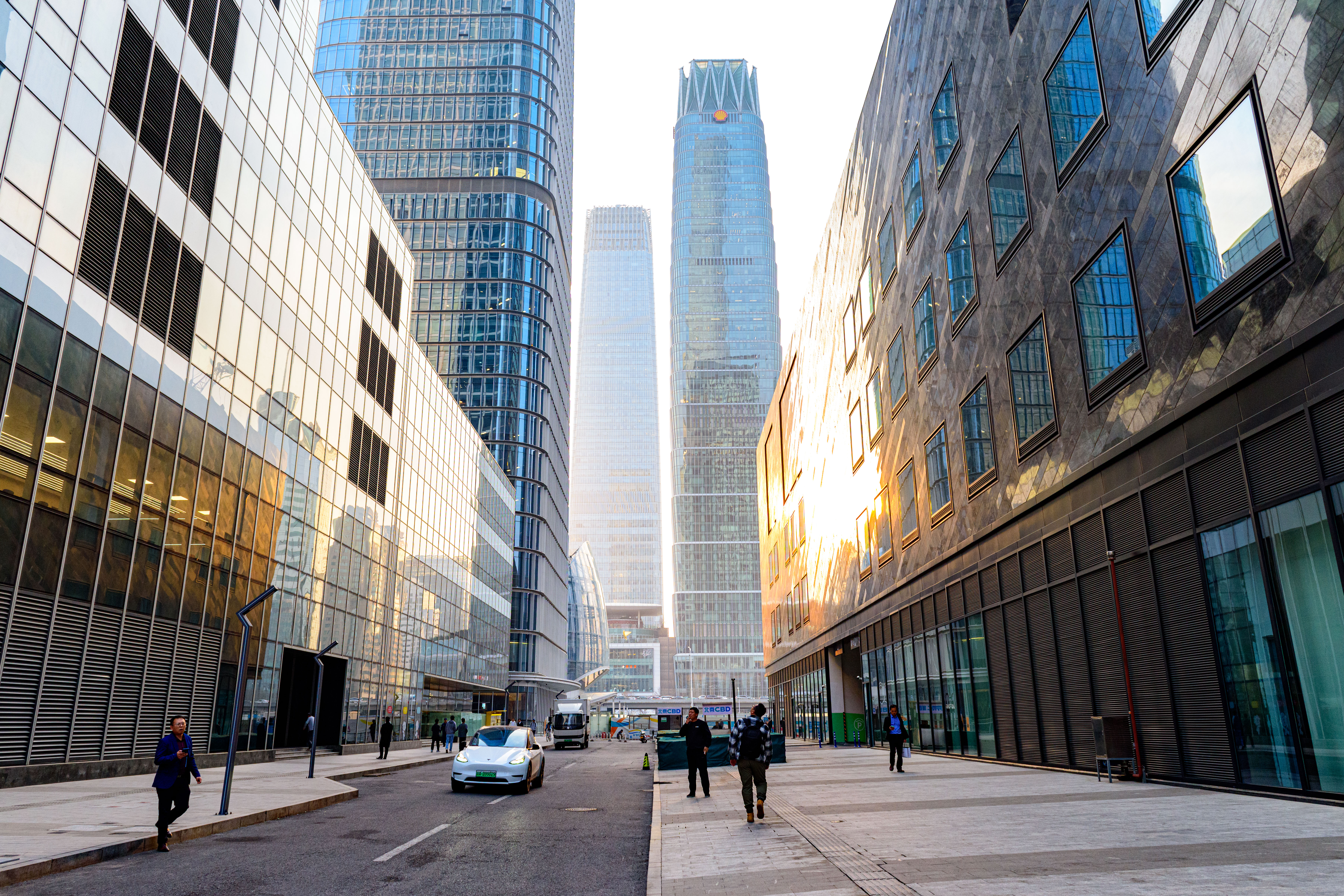
North of Jinghui St.

The mall is currently undergoing a planned Phase 3B expansion by Hollywood, California architecture firm 5+design, which will total 332,500 square meters.

=== China World Exhibition Hall ===
The China World Exhibition Hall provides traders with a forum of commerce, trade and information exchange. There have been a few influential trade shows that have been held in the hall including: China International Clothing & Accessories Fair (CHIC), Beijing International Household Electrical Appliance (HEA), PATA Travel Mart and the International Medical Instruments and Equipment Exhibition (China Med). China World Exhibition Division has four different departments: the exhibition & conference organization, exhibition services, space leasing and venue management.

== Tenants ==
- Actis Capital has an office in Room 713 of China World Tower 2
- Delta Air Lines has a city ticket office in Room 1308 of the China World Office 1. Previously Northwest Airlines had an office in L104 of the China World Trade Tower.

== Local transit ==
The China World Trade Center, also known by its Chinese abbreviated name, Guomao, is located in Chaoyang District in eastern Beijing, where the eastern Third Ring Road meets Jianguomenwai Avenue. Towers 1 and 3 are located northwest of the Guomao Overpass. Tower 2 is across the 3rd Ring Road to the northwest of the Guomao Overpass. Line 1 and Line 10 of the Beijing Subway both stop at the Guomao Station. Local public bus stops are named after Dabeiyao, the old location name for the vicinity of the World Trade Center:

- Dabeiyao (大北窑):113 421 806 807 808 809
- Dabeiyao West (大北窑西):1 9 28 99 205 609 666 668 728 729 804 805 938
- Dabeiyao North (大北窑北):113 214 402 405 421 488 503 601 673 683 686 707 729 特8 运通107
- Dabeiyao East (大北窑东):1 11 57 312 402 405 502 647 648 666 667 668 669 728 801 810 976
- Dabeiyao South (大北窑南):28 57 91 214 348 601 683 686 707 805 810 814 818 846 954 974 976 998 运通107

Beijing Airport Bus Route 1 also stops at Guomao.
