= Dongdan =

Dongdan may refer to:

- Dongdan, Beijing, crossing on Beijing's Chang'an Avenue and also a part of eastern central Beijing
- Dongdan Kingdom, puppet state established by the Liao dynasty
- Dongdan Station, interchange station on Line 1 and Line 5 of the Beijing Subway
