= Guomao, Beijing =

Area in Chaoyang District, the central business district of Beijing, China

Coordinates: 39.909819°N 116.455572°E

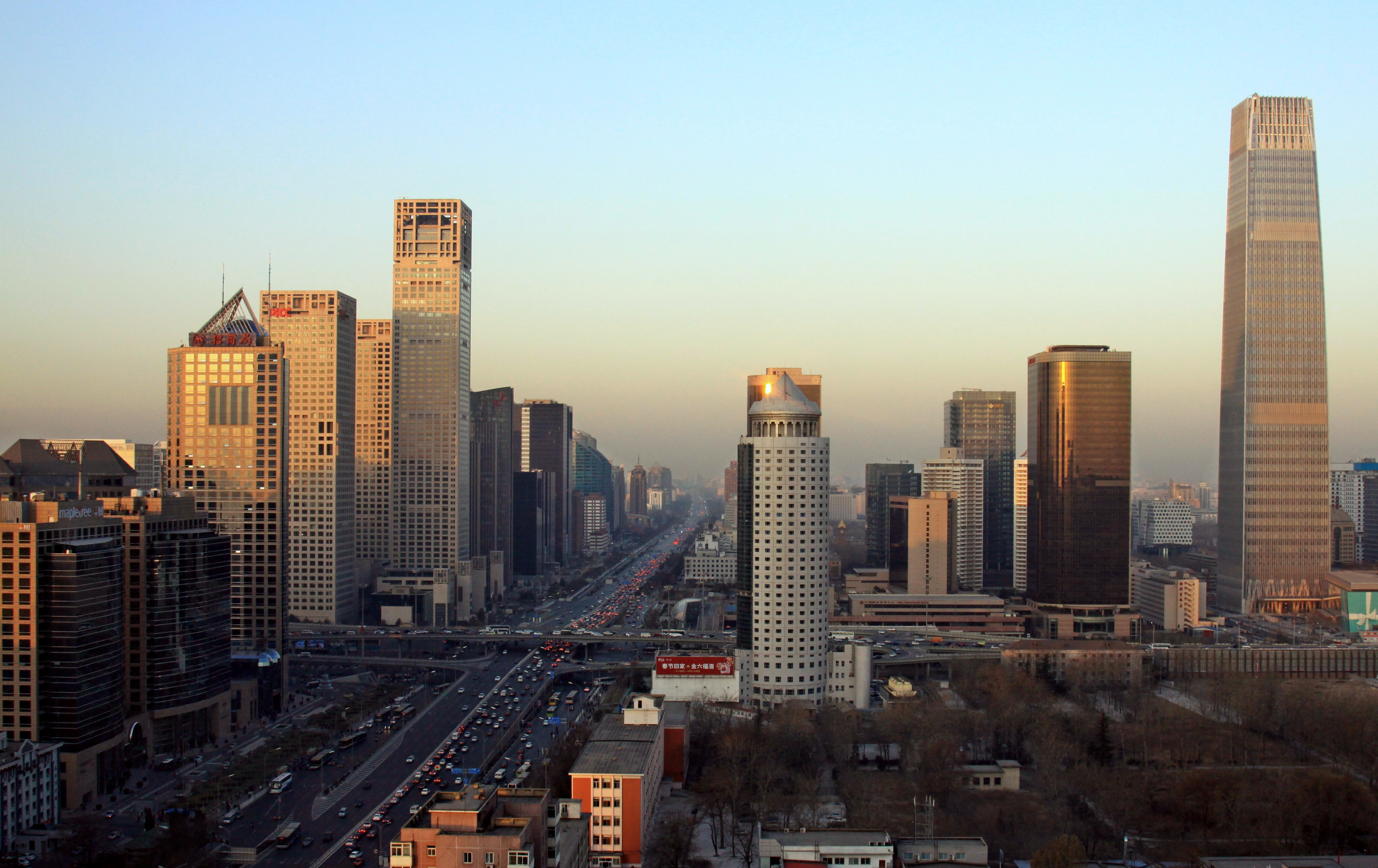
Guomao / Dabeiyao in 2009

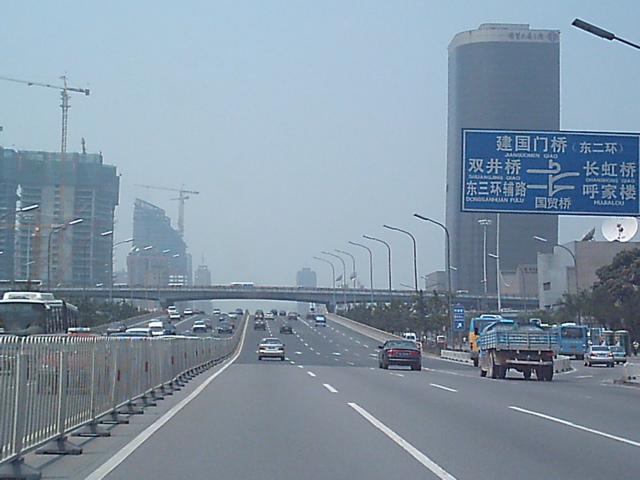
Guomao / Dabeiyao Area (August 2004 image)

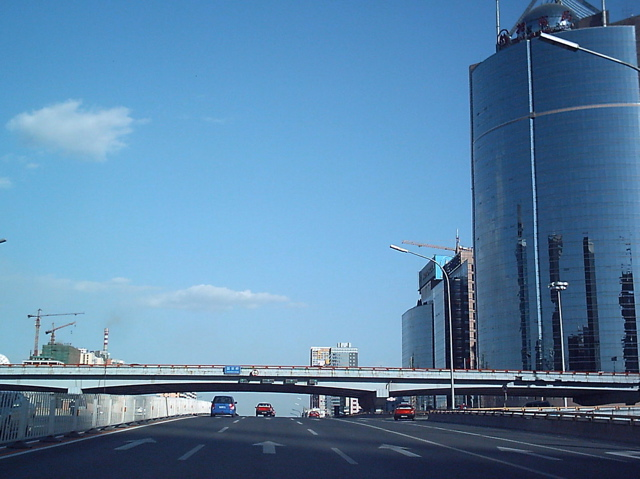
Guomao Bridge. The Guomao area is characterized by many skyscrapers.

Guomao (simplified Chinese: 国贸; traditional Chinese: 國貿; pinyin: guómào) is an area in Beijing at the center of the Beijing central business district, demarcated by the intersection of Jianguomen Outer Street and the Third Ring Road. The Chinese World Trade Center is located there. It was formerly known as Dabeiyao (simplified Chinese: 大北窑; traditional Chinese: 大北窯; pinyin: dàběiyáo), and bus stops in the vicinity still bear this name.

Guomao is also the name of the interchange station on Line 1 and Line 10.

== History ==
During the Ming Dynasty, the area was pastureland outside the city walls, and served as a hunting ground for the imperial family. During World War II, the occupying Japanese Army built a complex of kilns in the area, the largest of which in the north became a landmark. The area was then called Dabeiyao (Chinese: 大北窯; pinyin: Dàběiyáo), literally the "Great Northern Kiln".

In 1985, the China World Trade Center was built at the intersection of the 3rd Ring Road and Jianguomen Outer Street and the Beijing CBD was established in 1993. The Dabeiyao Overpass was consequently renamed the Guomao Bridge - "Guomao" is the abbreviation for the Chinese name of the China World Trade Center (simplified Chinese: 中国国际贸易中心; traditional Chinese: 中國國際貿易中心; pinyin: Zhōngguó guójì màoyì zhōngxīn). Guomao subway station was opened on September 28, 1999.

== Public transportation ==
- Beijing Subway: Guomao Station on Line 1 and Line 10
- Bus routes that stop at and around the Guomao Overpass:
  - Dabeiyao West (大北窑西):1 9 28 58 99 619 666 668 804 805 805快 938 夜1
  - Dabeiyao North (大北窑北):98 113 402 405 417 421 488 503 601 619 673 974 特8 夜30 运通107
  - Dabeiyao East (大北窑东):1 11 57 312 402 405 502 626 647 648 666 667 668 669 801 976 夜1
  - Dabeiyao South (大北窑南):28 57 72 91 98 113 348 421 601 805 805快 806 807 808 809 814 846 938快 974 976 998 夜30 运通107 专5 专10 专164
- Beijing Airport Bus: Route 1.
