= China World Trade Center Tower III =

Supertall skyscraper in Beijing, China

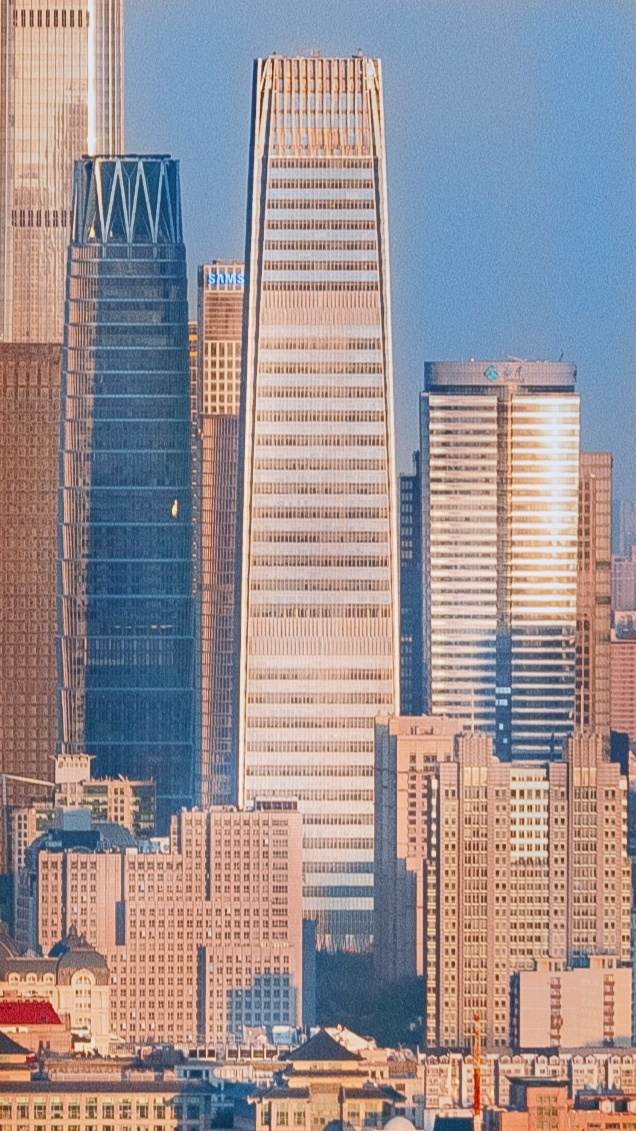
- China World Trade Center Tower III in October 2021

General information
- Status: Completed
- Type: Office, hotel and retail
- Coordinates: 39.9109336°N 116.452176°E
- Groundbreaking: March 25, 2003
- Construction started: June 16, 2005
- Completed: August 30, 2010
- Opening: November 23, 2008

Height
- Architectural: 330 m (1,083 ft)
- Top floor: 311.8 m (1,023 ft)

Technical details
- Floor count: 74
- Floor area: 280,000 m^{2} (3,013,900 sq ft)
- Lifts/elevators: 41, made by Schindler Group

Design and construction
- Architect: (United States) Skidmore, Owings and Merrill
- Structural engineer: (United Kingdom) Arup

China World Trade Center Tower III is a supertall skyscraper with 74 floors, 5 underground floors, and 30 elevators in Beijing, China. It is the third phase of development of the China World Trade Center complex in Beijing's central business district of Chaoyang at the junction of the East Third Ring Road and Jianguomen Outer Street (Jian Guo Men Wai Dajie). The building topped out at 330 m (1,083 ft) on 29 October 2007 and completed in 2010. It is the second tallest building in Beijing.

It is used for office and hotel space, with retail at its base. The building houses a 278-room 5-star hotel, a 1,600-seat grand ballroom and a carpark. The office space is located on floors 1 to 55. Floors 64 to 77 are occupied by the China World Summit Wing Hotel with a lobby on the 64th floor. Floors 79 to 81 are used for a restaurant and an observation deck. The four elevators that lead directly from the lobby to the 64th floor are Schindler 7000 and reach a maximum speed of 10 metres per second.

The building was constructed by the architectural group Skidmore, Owings & Merrill, the same company that constructed the current One World Trade Center in New York City.

In 2010, the China World Trade Center Tower III became the world's tallest building with a rooftop helipad, surpassing the U.S. Bank Tower. Its helipad is 330 m (1,083 feet) high compared to the U.S. Bank Tower's helipad at 310.3 m (1,018 feet). As of December 2018, China World Trade Center Tower III is the second-tallest building with a rooftop helipad, with the tallest being the Guangzhou International Finance Center tower, which is located in Guangzhou with a height of 439 meters (1,439 feet).

== See also ==
- China World Trade Center
- Guangzhou International Finance Center
- List of tallest buildings in Beijing
