= Dongdan station =

Beijing Subway interchange station

Dongdan 东单
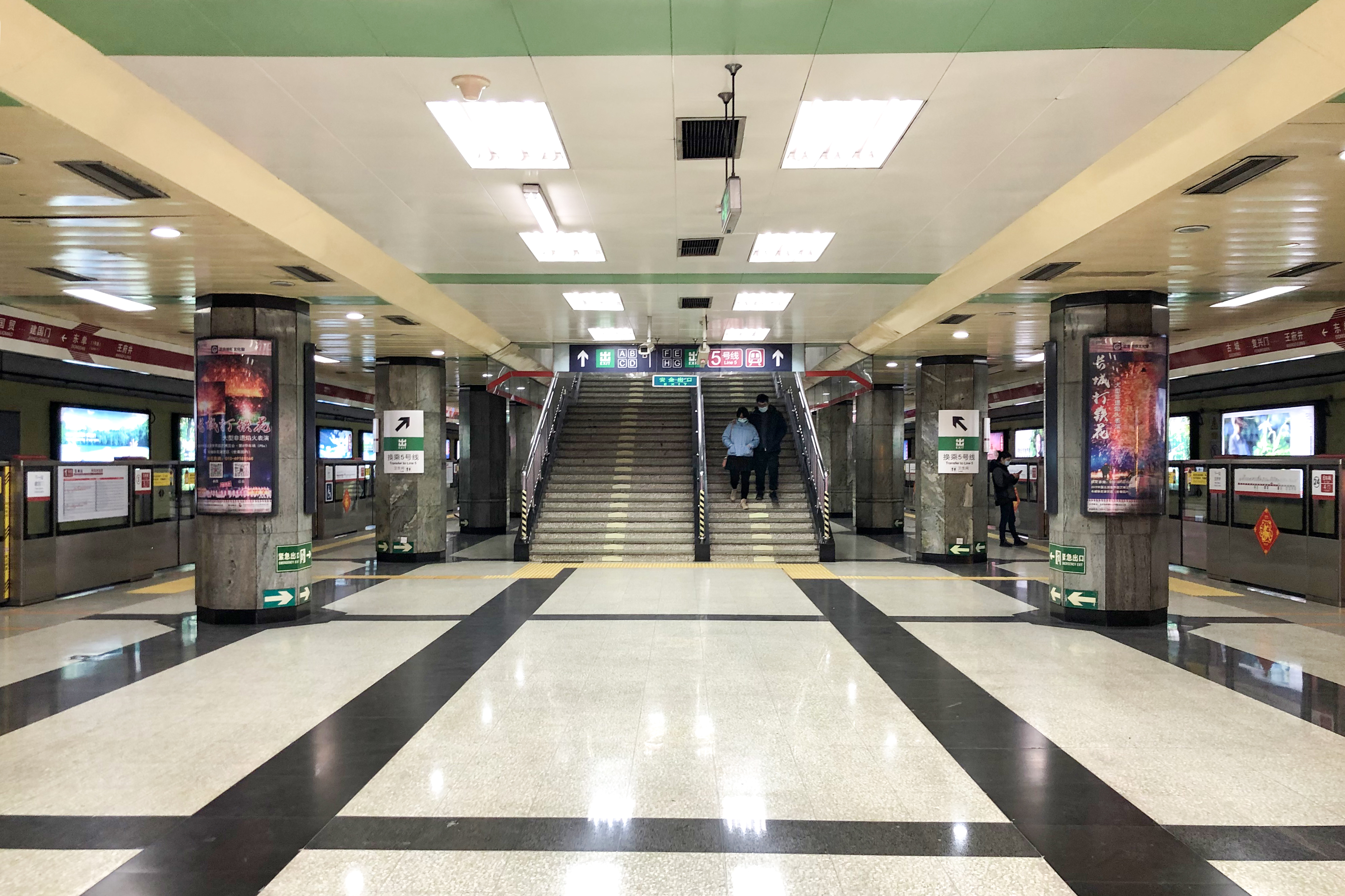
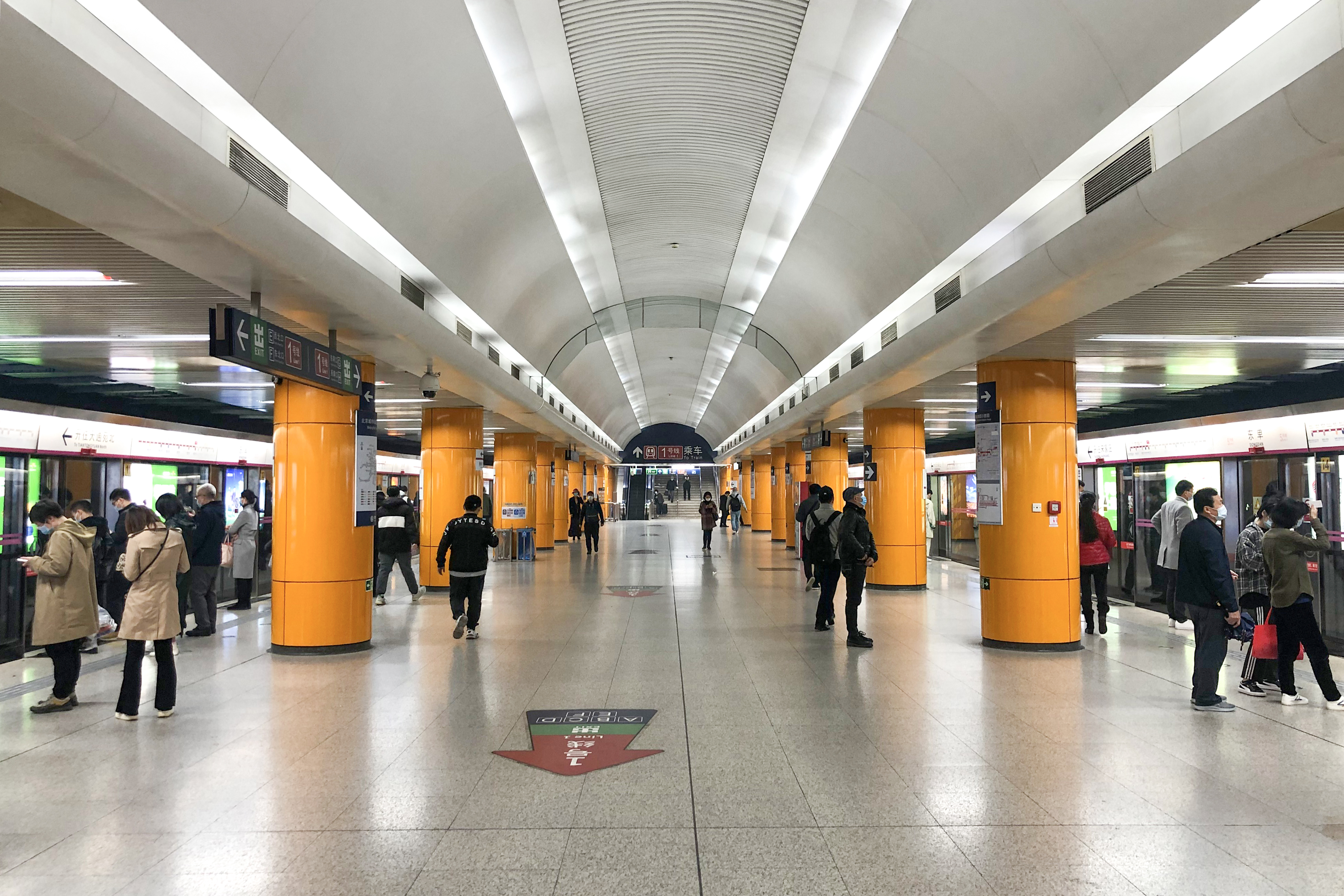
- Line 1 platform Line 5 platform

General information
- Location: East Chang'an Avenue / Jianguomen Inner Street and Dongdan North Street / Chongwenmen Inner Street; Dongdan, Dongcheng District, Beijing; China
- Coordinates: 39.908255°N 116.419845°E
- Operator: Beijing Mass Transit Railway Operation Corporation Limited
- Lines: Line 1; Line 5
- Platforms: 4 (2 island platforms)
- Tracks: 4

Construction
- Structure type: Underground
- Accessible: Yes

Other information
- Station code: 119 (Line 1)

History
- Opened: September 28, 1999; 26 years ago (Line 1); October 7, 2007; 18 years ago (Line 5)

Services
Preceding station	Beijing Subway	Following station
Wangfujing towards Pingguoyuan	Line 1	Jianguomen towards Universal Resort
Dengshi Kou towards Tiantongyuanbei	Line 5	Chongwen Men towards Songjiazhuang
Location
- Location within Beijing

Dongdan Station (Chinese: 东单站; pinyin: Dōngdān Zhàn) is an interchange station on Line 1 and Line 5 of the Beijing Subway, located at Dongdan.

== Station layout ==
Both the line 1 and line 5 station have underground island platforms.

== Exits ==
There are 8 exits, lettered A, B, C, D, E, F, G, and H. Exits A and F are accessible.

== Gallery ==
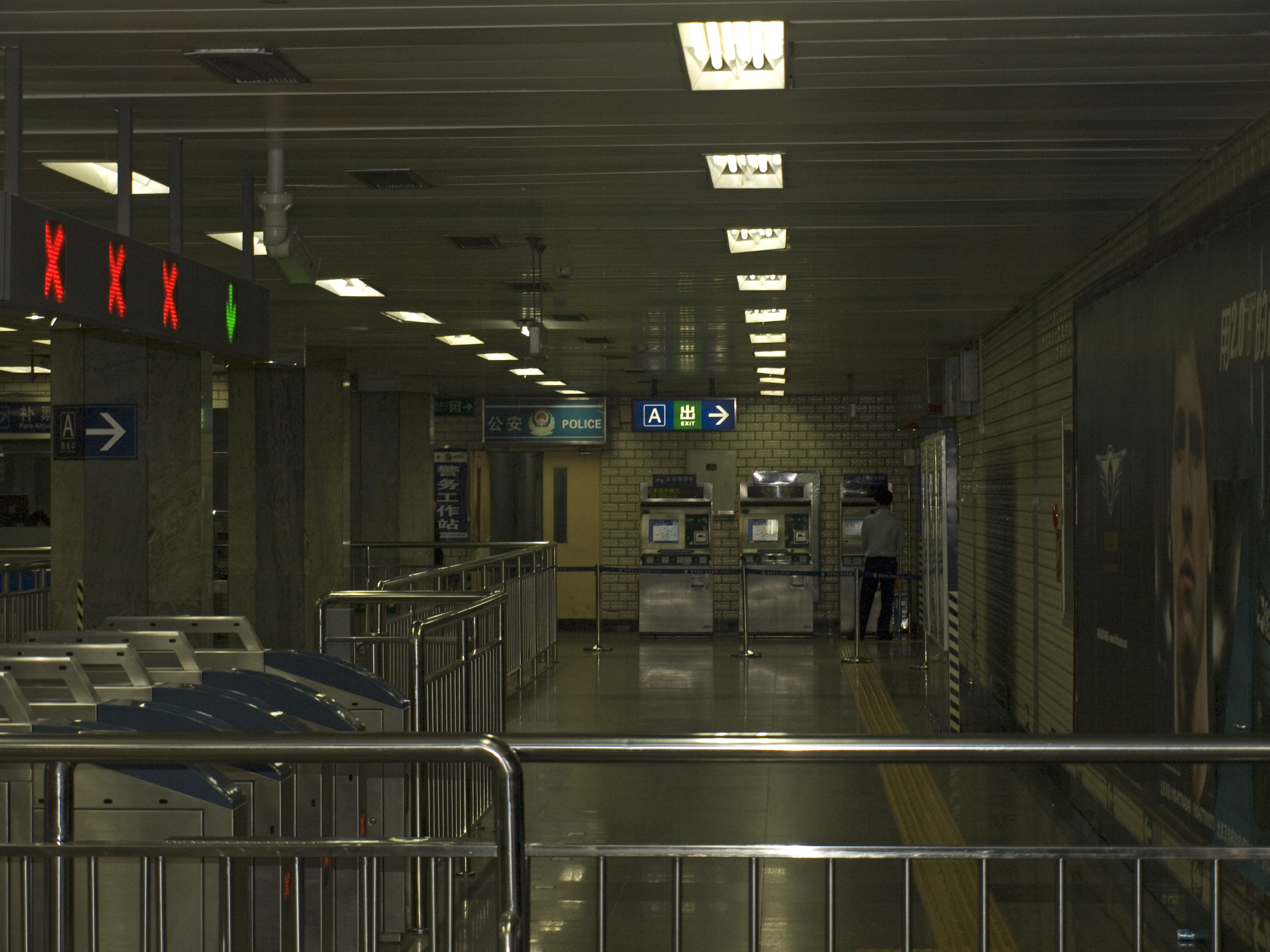
Entrance to Dongdan Station, Line 1

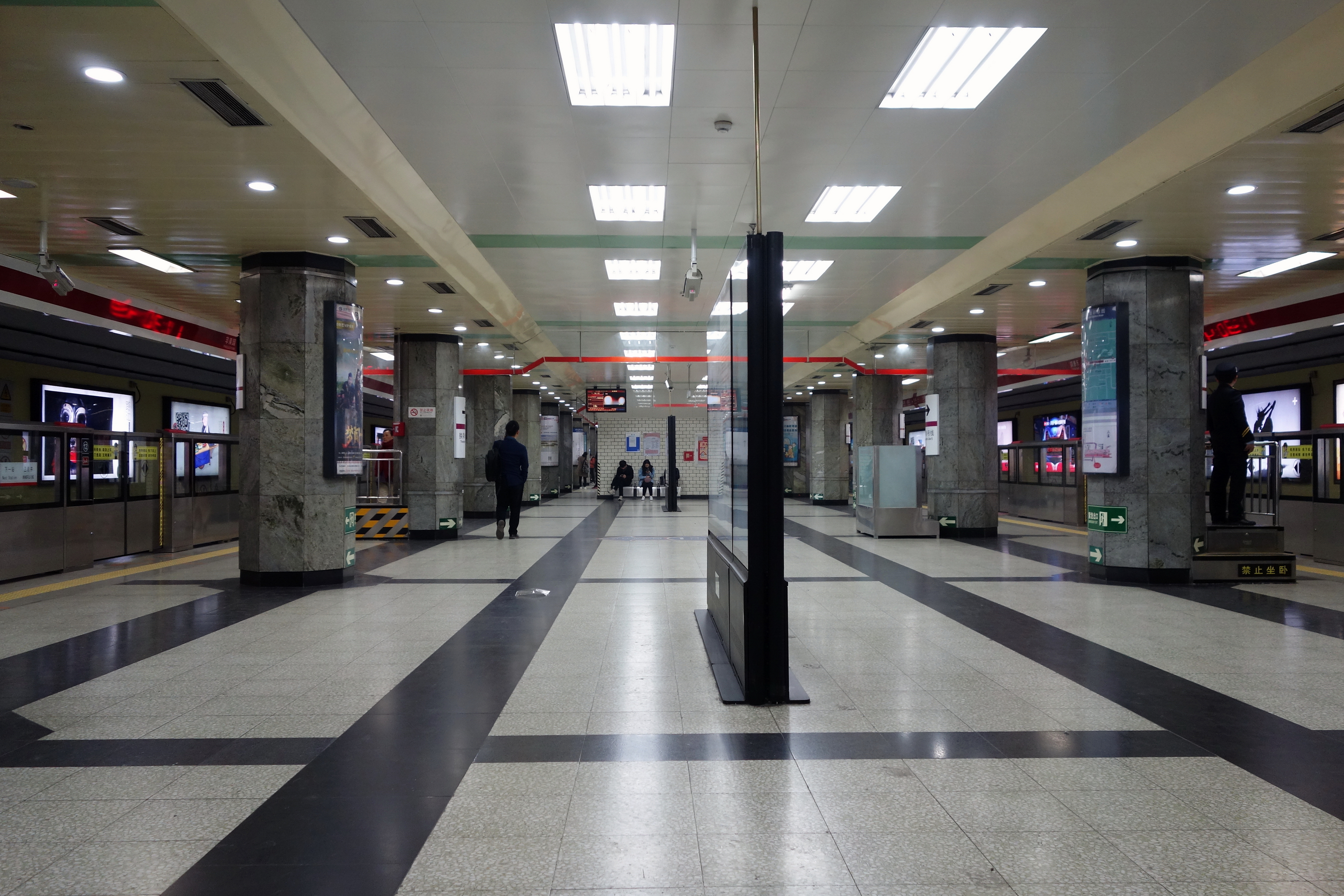
Dongdan Station Platform, Line 1 (October 2018)

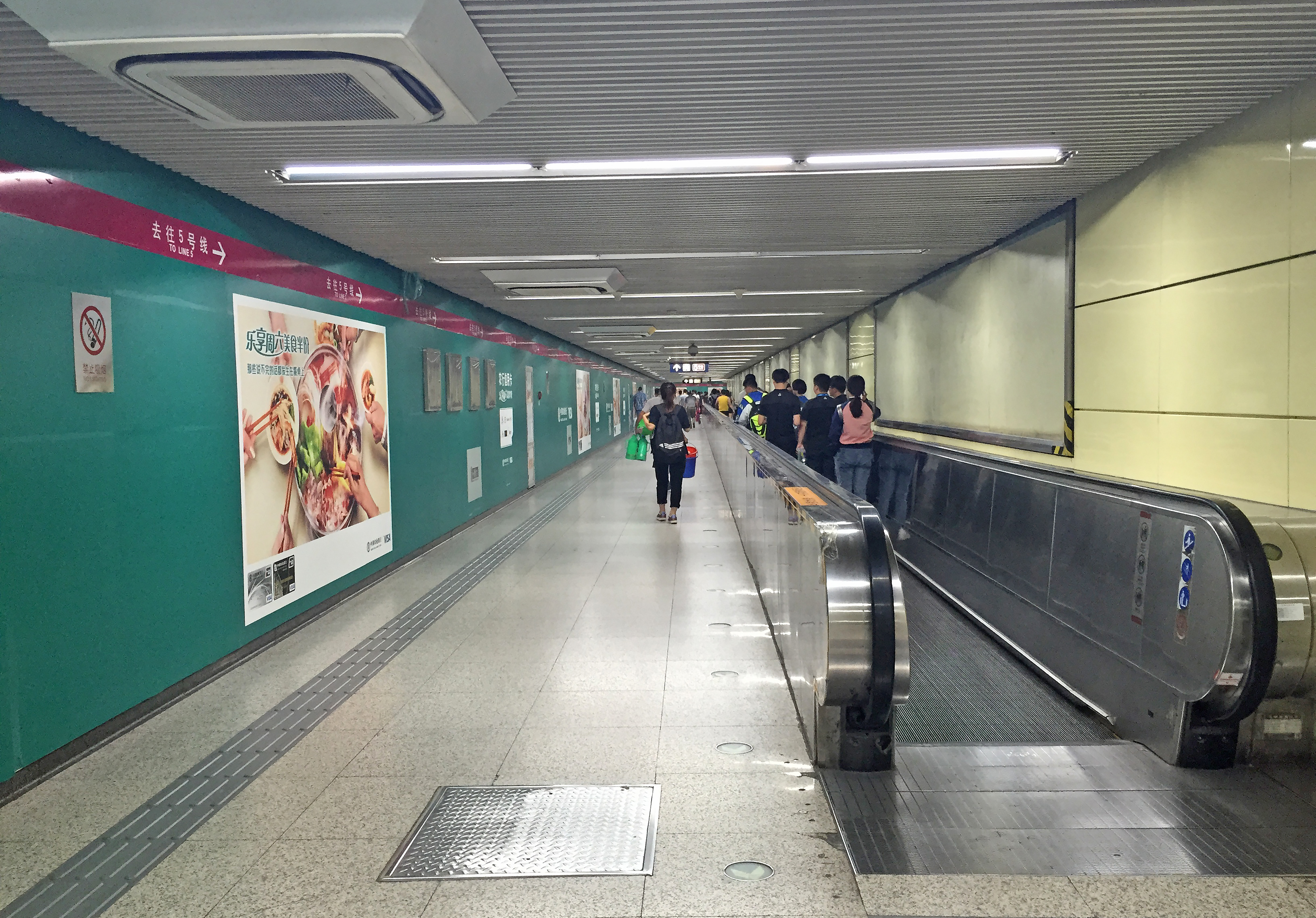
L1-L5 Interchange passage

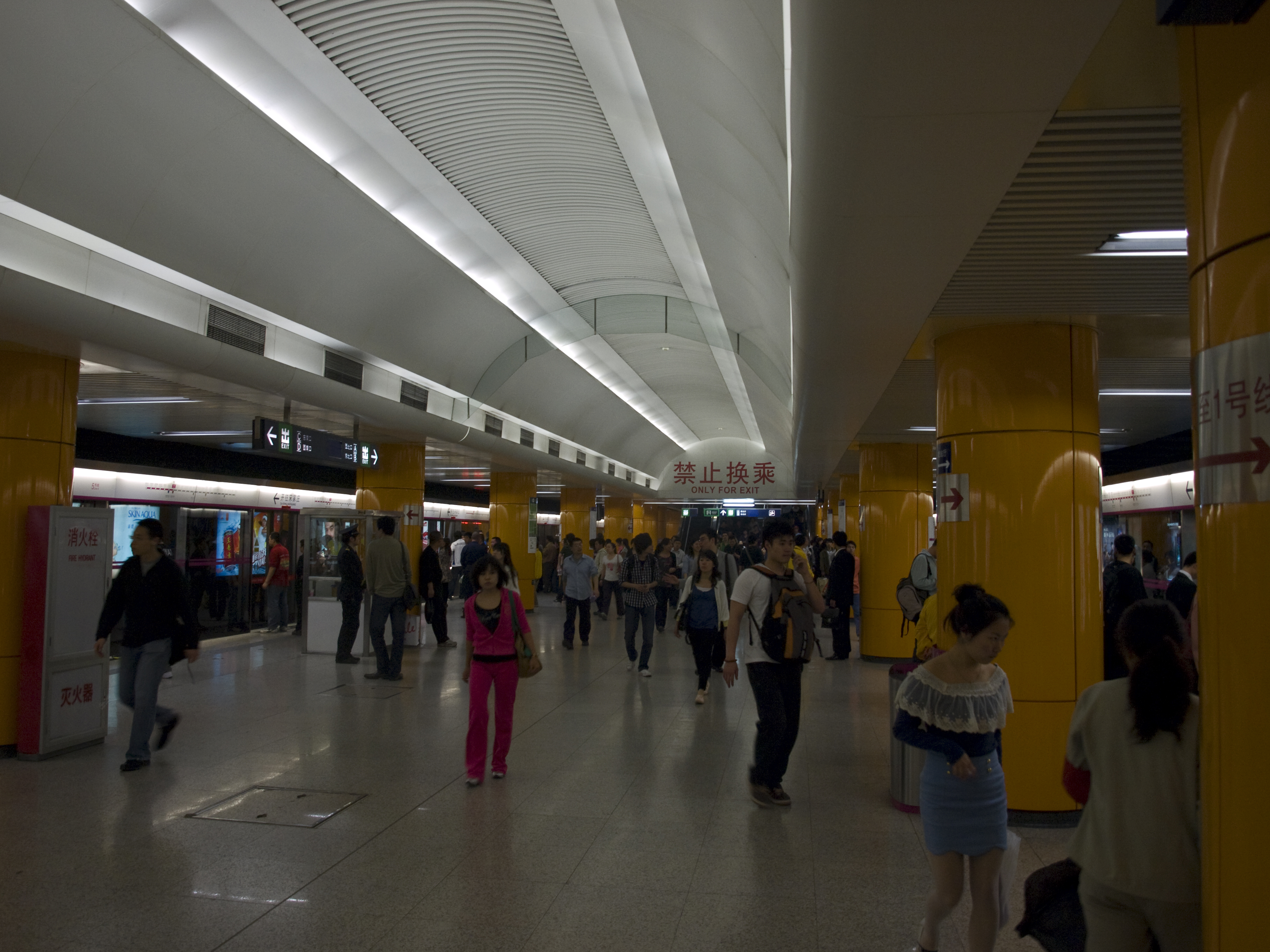
Dongdan Station (Line 5) Platform.

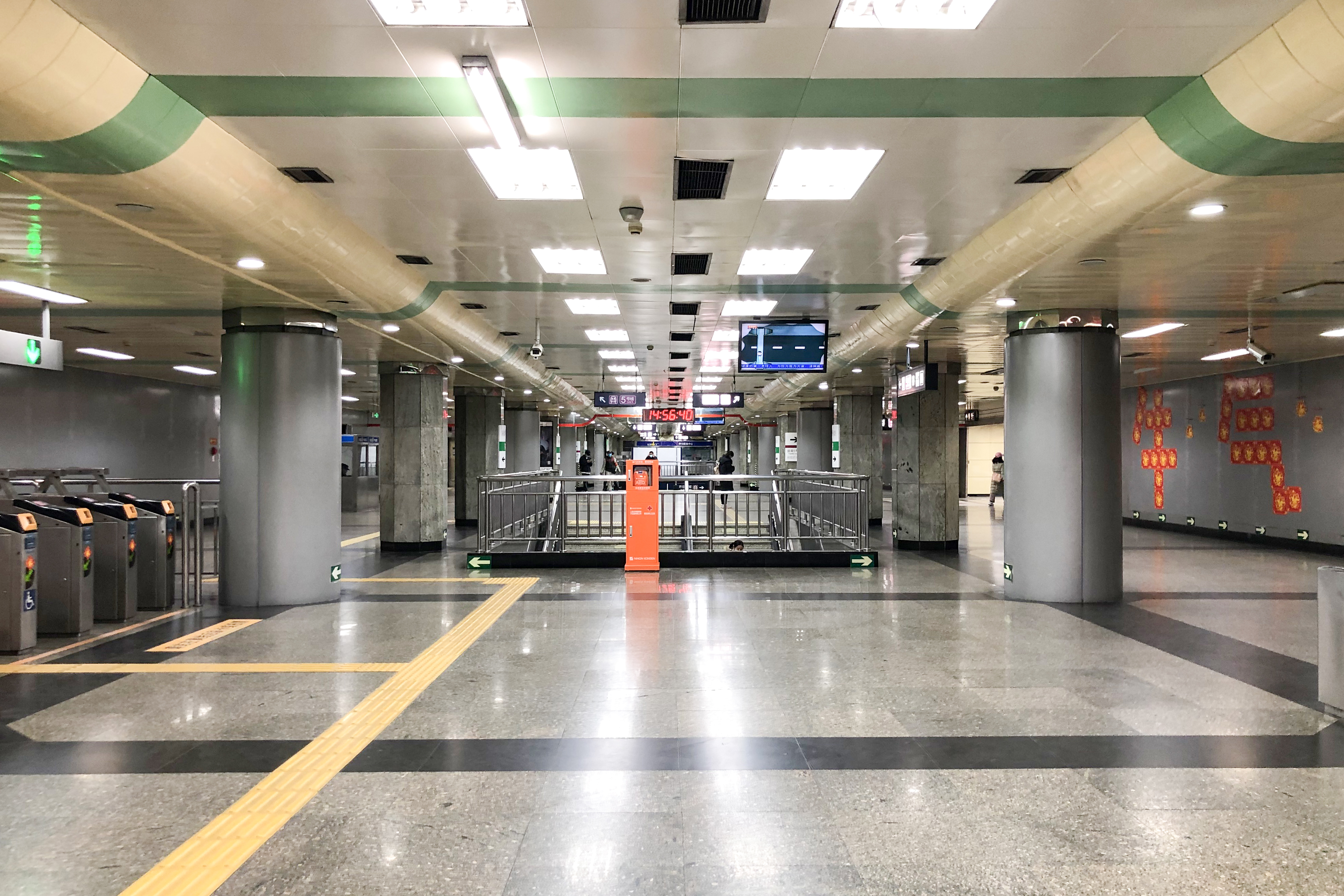
Line 1 concourse

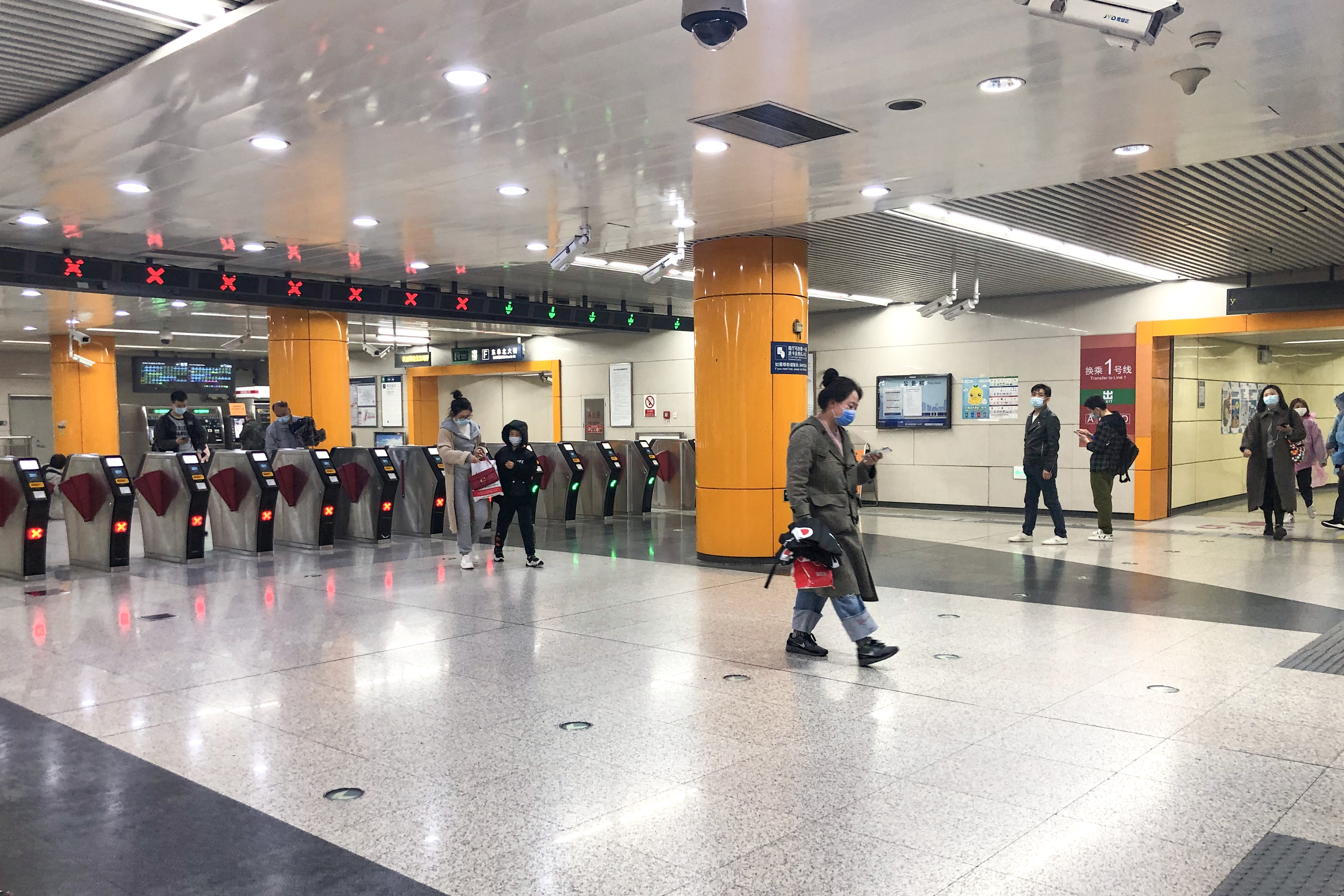
Line 5 north concourse

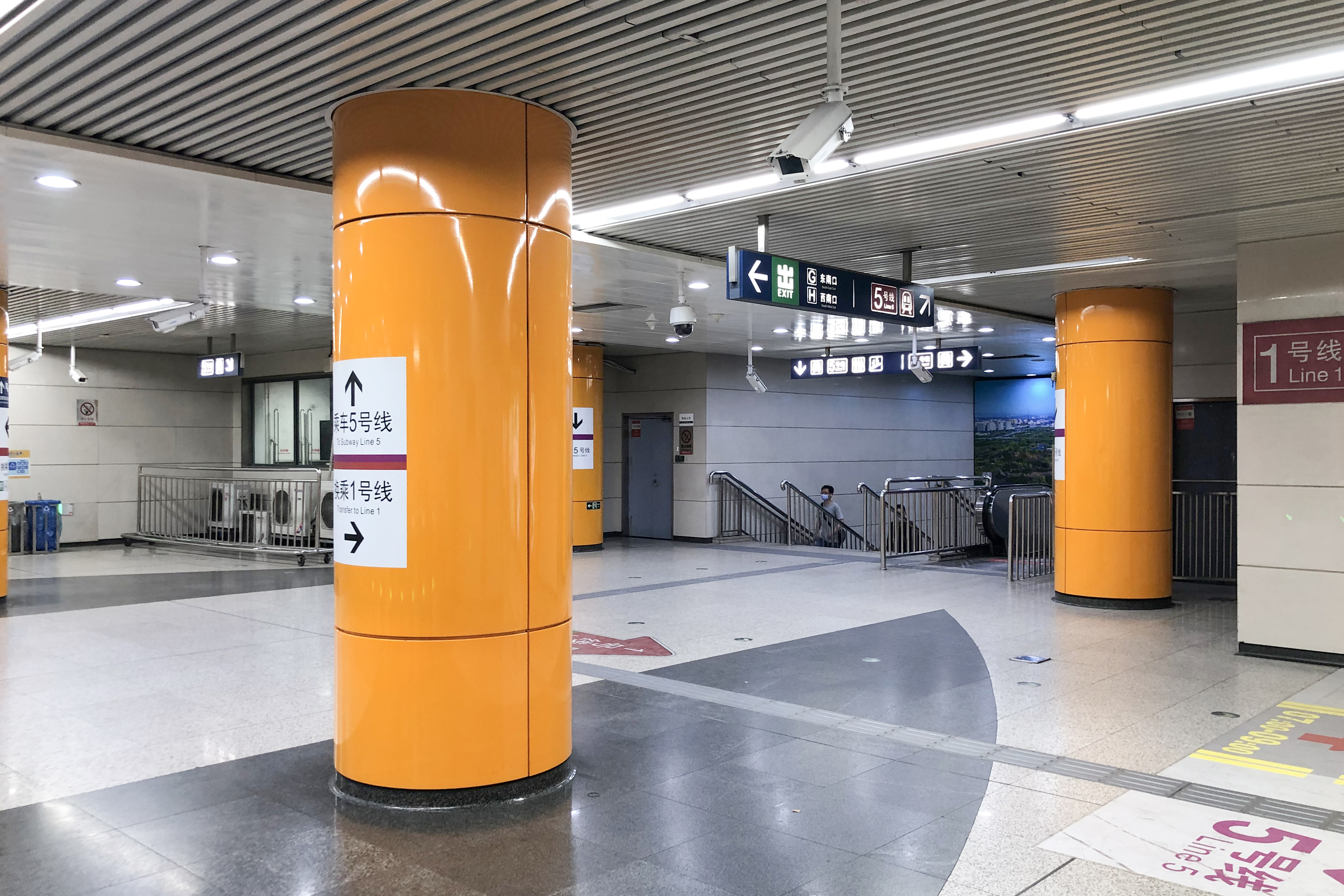
Line 5 south concourse

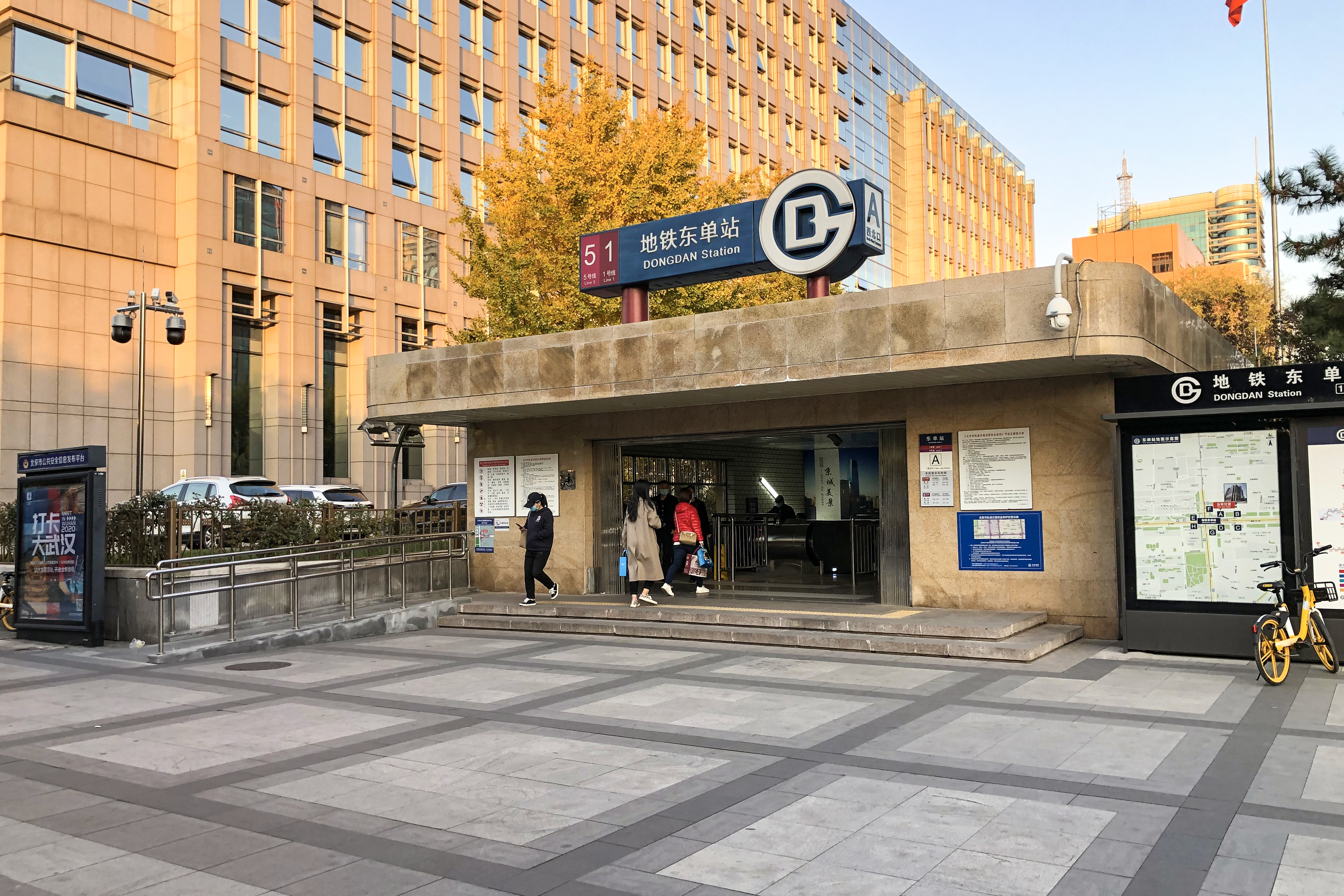
Exit A
