= Jianguo Road (Beijing) =

Road in Beijing, China

Coordinates: 39.908°N 116.538°E

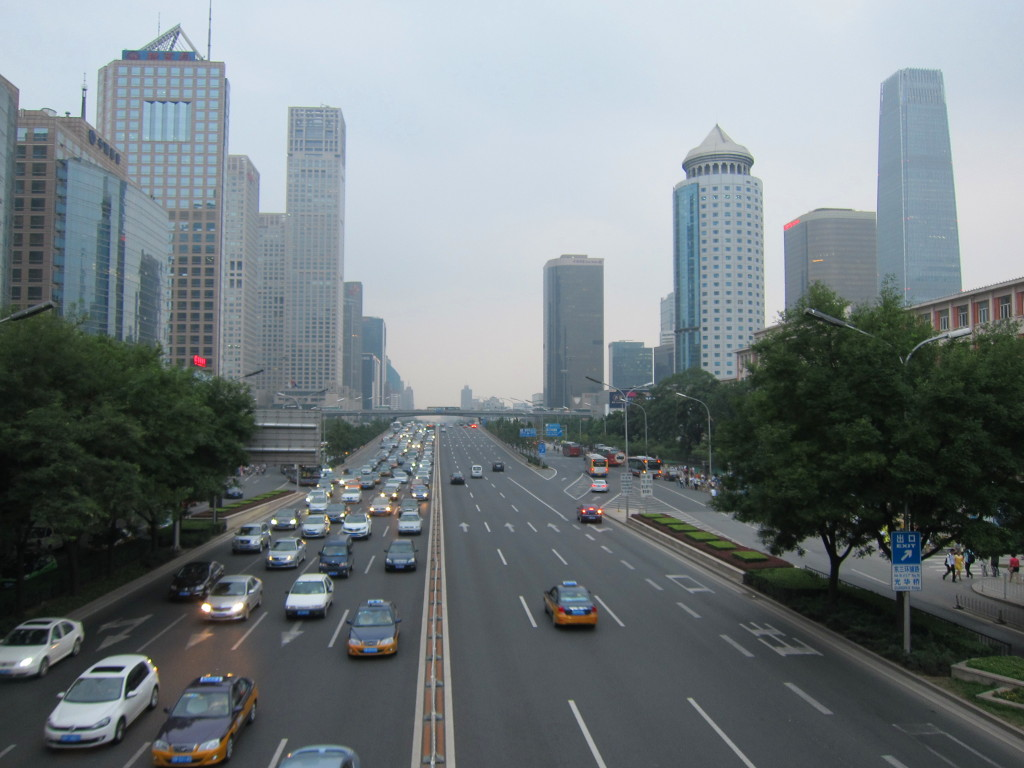
- Jianguo Road from a pedestrian bridge

Major junctions
- West end: Guomao Bridge
- East end: Jingtong Expressway

Location
- Country: China

Highway system
- Transport in China

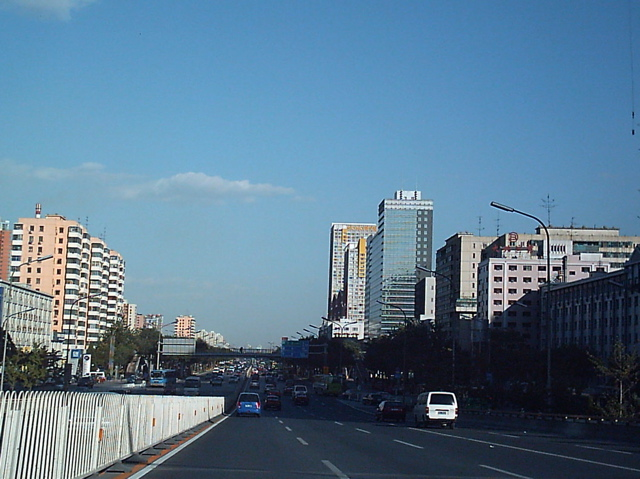

Jianguo Road (simplified Chinese: 建国路; traditional Chinese: 建國路; pinyin: Jiànguó Lù) is a major road in eastern Beijing. It forms part of the extended Chang'an Avenue.

== Route description ==
It runs from the Dabeiyao crossing (Guomao Bridge) in the west to Dawang Bridge, the start of the Jingtong Expressway in the east, although it also acts as an auxiliary road to the expressway.

It also runs through the heartland of the Beijing CBD. The Soho New Town building complex is alongside Jianguo Road.

The Jianguo Road as an auxiliary road to the Jingtong Expressway runs into Tongzhou District.

Line 1 of the Beijing subway runs along the route until Sihui East; the Batong Line runs as of the Sihui station.
