= Beijing Capital Airport Bus =

Chinese bus service

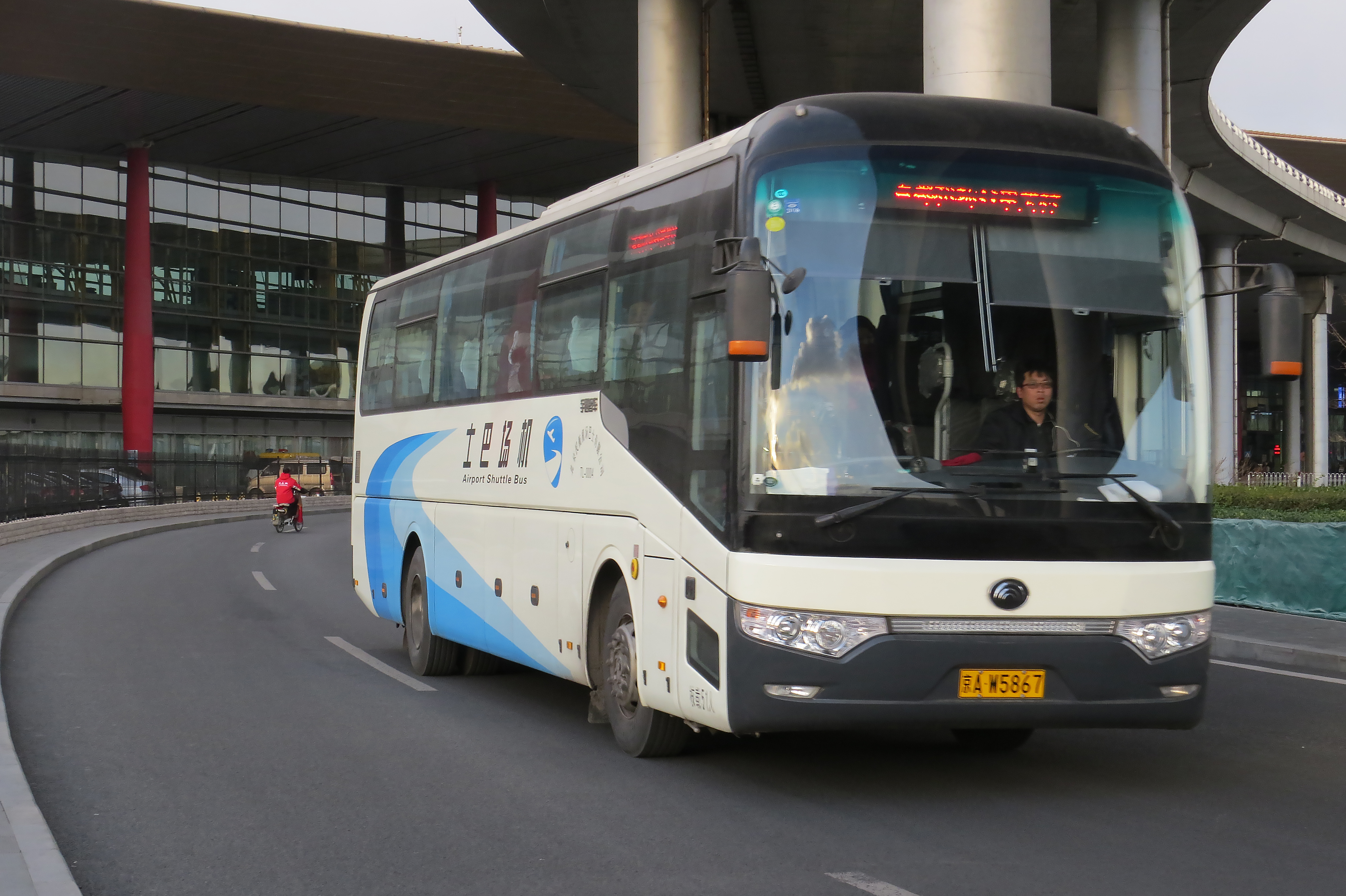
Beijing Airport Bus departing Terminal 3

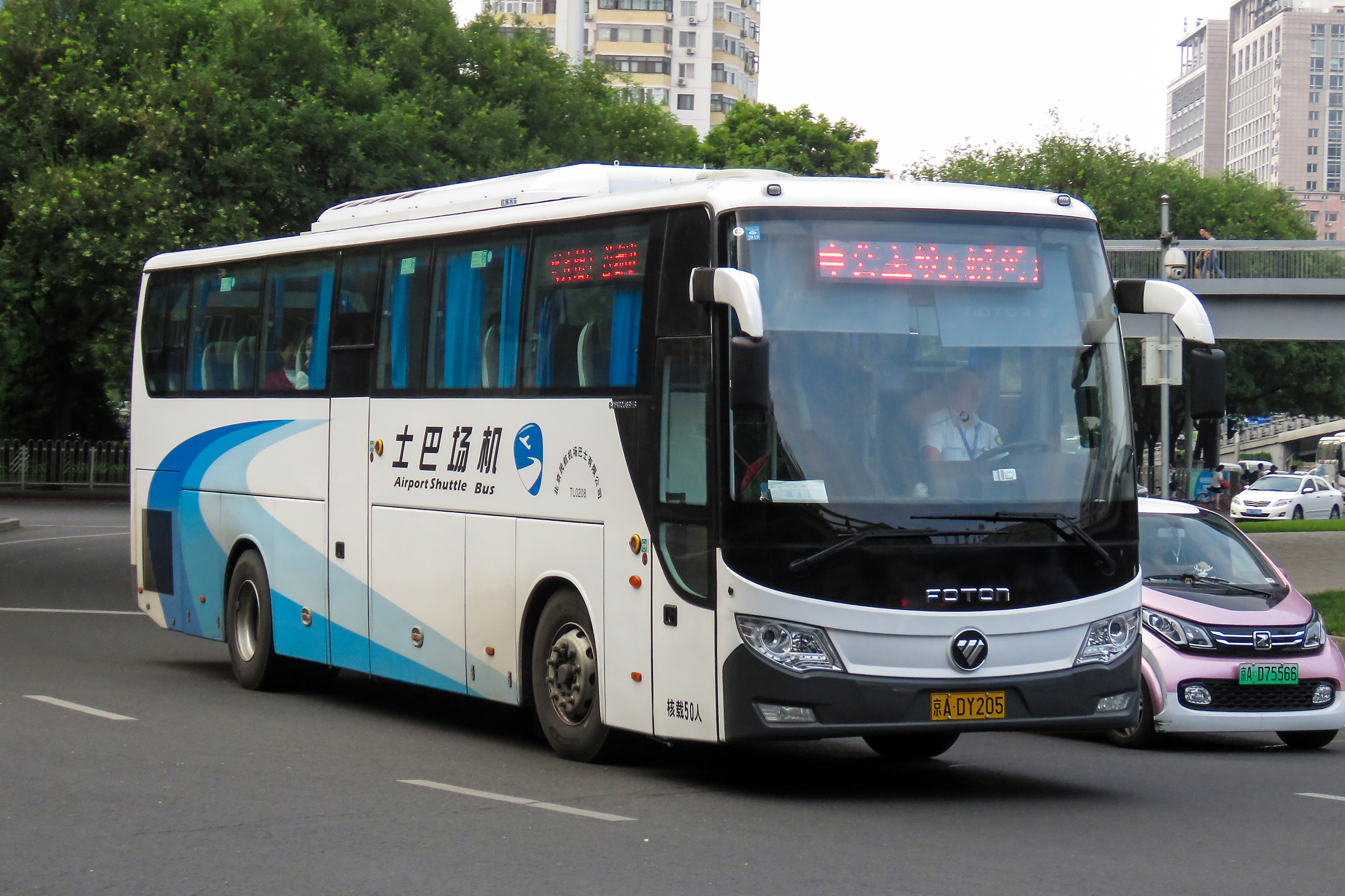
Airport bus at Hangtian Bridge.

The Beijing Capital Airport Shuttle Bus (北京首都机场巴士) is an express public bus service mainly between the Beijing Capital International Airport (Capital Airport) and points within the city of Beijing and the surrounding region. As of August 2025, there are only 5 routes. One way fare on routes to the city costs between ¥20 to ¥55 on routes.

== Tickets and information ==
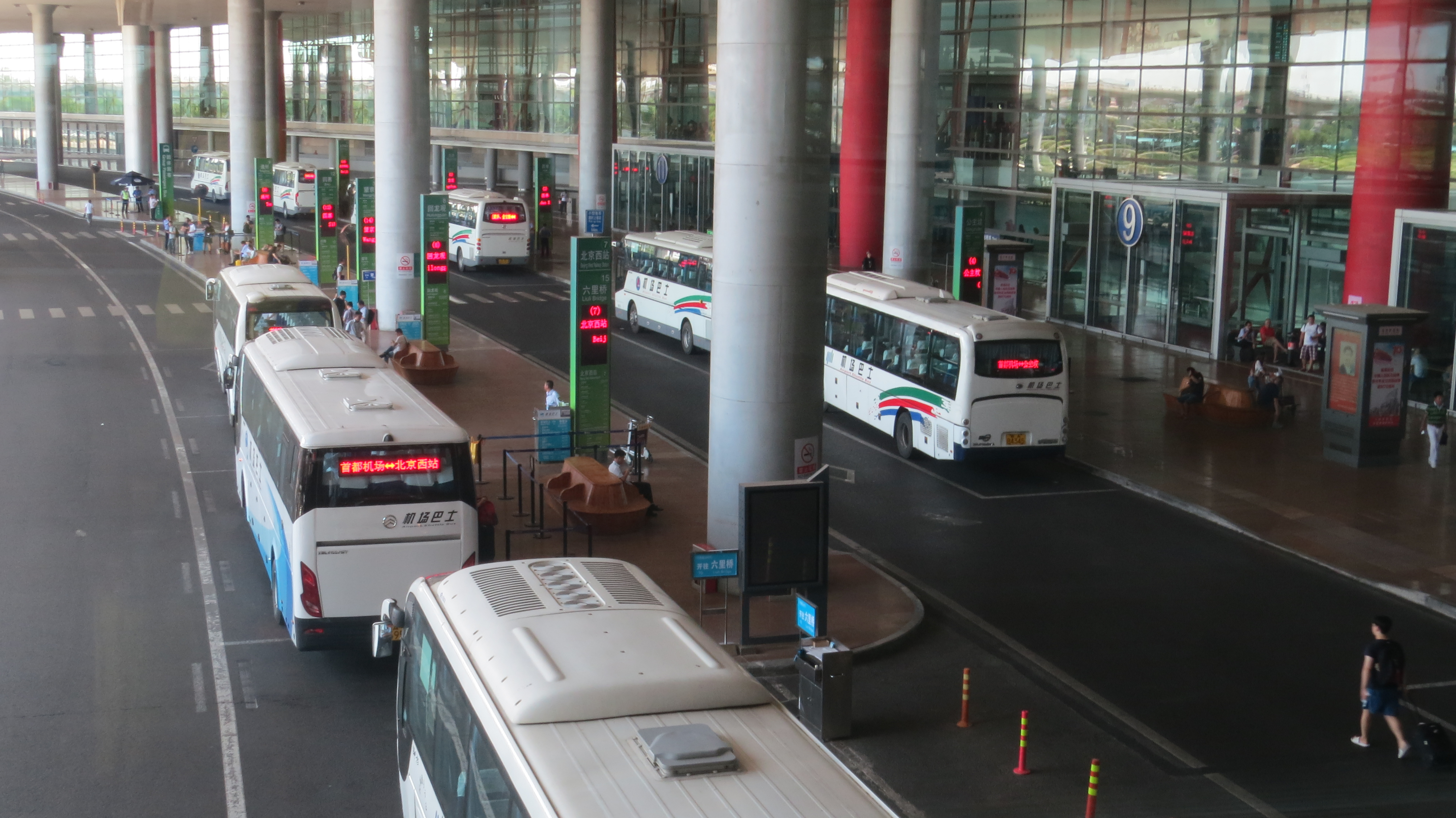
Airport Buses at Terminal 3

Ticket counter locations:

- Terminal 1: Inside Gate No. 7 on F1
- Terminal 2: Outside Gates 9, 10 and 11 on F1
- Terminal 3: in Exit Zone A, opposite Exit Zone C on F2 and next to Gate 5, 7 and 11 on F1.

Telephone Inquiry:

- General airport hotline: +86-10 96158
- Bus lines to city: +86-10-64573891 / 64594376 / 64594375
- Bus lines to other cities: +86-10-64558718

== Routes ==
=== Capital Airport – City Routes ===
Route	Destination	Stops	Hours
1	Fangzhuang	T3 – T2 – T1 –Sanyuan Bridge – Liangma Bridge – Baijiazhuang – Dabeiyao (Guomao) – Panjiayuan – Shilihe (Kingwing Hot Spring International Hotel) – Fangzhuang	7:00 - 1:00 (following day)
1	Fangzhuang	Fangzhuang (South of the East Entrance to Sports Park of Fangzhuang) – Dabeiyao (Southern Airlines Pearl Hotel) – T2 – T1 – T3	5:10-21:00
2	Xidan	T3 – T2 – T1 – West of Beixiaojie Bridge – West of Andingmen Bridge – West of Jishuitan Bridge – South of Xizhimen Bridge – East of Fuxingmen Bridge – South of Xidan Intersection (Subway Station)	7:00–24:00
2	Xidan	Xidan (Civil Aviation Building) – Chegongzhuang Subway Station, Exit B – Yonghegong Subway Station Exit B – T2 – T1 – T3	5:10–21:00
2	Xidan	T3 – T2 – T1 – Sanyuanqiao – Dongzhimen – Dongsishitiao Bridge – Chaoyangmen – Yabaolu – Beijing International Hotel (north of Beijing railway station)	24:00 to the last domestic arrival of the day
3	Beijing railway station	T3 – T2 – T1 – Dongzhimen – Dongsishitiao Bridge – Chaoyangmen – Yabao Road– Beijing International Hotel – Beijing railway station	7:00–24:00
3	Beijing railway station	Beijing railway station(Beijing railway station East Street) – International Hotel – Dongzhimen (Newsstand, south of the road, 50m east of the bridge) – Landmark Tower (West Gate) – T2 – T1 – T3	5:10–21:00
4	Gongzhufen	T3 – T2 – T1 – China International Exhibition Center – Xibahe – Anzhen Bridge – Madian Bridge – Beitaipingzhuang – Jimen Bridge – Friendship Hotel – Suzhou Bridge – Zizhu Bridge – Hangtian Bridge – Gongzhufen (Xinxing Hotel)	6:00–half hour past last arrival of the day
4	Gongzhufen	Gongzhufen (Xinxing Hotel) – Friendship Hotel (Air Ticket Office at the north gate) – Beitaipingzhuang (50m east of the intersection) – Anzhen Stop (under the flyover east of Puppet Theater) – Xibahe (Ticket Office of Shenzhen Airlines) – T2 – T1 – T3	4:30 - after half an hour of the last domestic flight. First bus runs nonstop to Airport. Stop over at Friendship Hotel and Beitaipingzhuang only after 21:00.
5	Zhongguancun	T3 – T2 – T1 – Xiaoying – Asian Games Village (Anhui Bridge) – Xueyuan Bridge – Zhongguancun (Fourth Bridge)	6:50–The next day1:00(Low Season 24:00) Every 30 minutes. Buses depart when fully seated.(Another two stopovers will be respectively made at Guangshun North Street and Huguang Middle Street after 21:00. High Season: March 1- October 26, Spring Festival. )
5	Zhongguancun	Zhongguancun (Fourth Bridge) – Beihang University (north gate) – Huixin West Street (Under the Bridge of Huixin West Street, East of Anhui Plaza) – T2 – T1 – T3	5:10–22:00 Every 30 minutes. Buses depart when fully seated.
6	Asian Games Village	T3 – T2 – T1 – Guangshun North Street – Huguang Middle Street – Yuhuili – Beiyuanludatun – Datun – Olympic Village(In front of the Gate to the Olympic Village by University of Chinese Academy of Sciences) – Best Western OL Stadium Hotel Beijing (former Labor Building)	8:00–21:00 Every 40 minutes. Buses depart when fully seated.
6	Asian Games Village	Best Western OL Stadium Hotel Beijing (former Labor Building) – CAS Institute of Geography (by Nangounihe Bus Stop) – Datun – Beiyuanludatun (by the Bus Stop opposite to Shiteng Business Hotel) – Gate A to the Fourth Zone of Wangjing West Garden – Wangjing Garden West Zone – T2 – T1 – T3	6:00–19:10 Every 40 minutes. Buses depart when fully seated.
7	Beijing West railway station	T3 – T2 – T1 – Chaoyanggongyuan Bridge (50m south of the Bridge) – Tonghuihe North Road (By the East of the New BTV Building) –In front of Beijing Energy Investment Holding Co., Ltd – Guangqumen (200m north of the west side of the intersection) – Ciqikou (100m north of the west side of the intersection) – Zhushikou (100m north of the east side of the intersection) – Caishikou (100m north of the west side of the intersection) – Guang'anmenwai (500m north of the west side of the Bridge) – West railway station (Zhongyan Hotel)	7:00–The next day1:00(Low Season 24:00) Every 30 minutes. Buses depart when fully seated.(High Season: March 1- October 26, Spring Festival. )
7	Beijing West railway station	Zhongyan Hotel (South Square of Beijing West railway station) – Guang'anmen (50m south of the east side of Baiguanglu Beikou) – Ciqikou (100m south of the west side of the intersection) – Chaoyanggongyuan Bridge (beside the bus stop at the east side road, north of the Bridge) – T2 – T1 – T3	4:50–22:00 Every 30 minutes. Buses depart when fully seated.
8	Shangdi	T3 – T2 – T1 – Baifang (Tiantong Dongyuan) – Tiantong Xiyuan Zone 1 (North Gate) – Huilongguan East Street – Huilongguan West Street – Huilongguan – Shangdi Information Industry Development Area (Holiday Inn Express)	9:00–22:40 Every 40 minutes. Buses depart when fully seated.
8	Shangdi	Shangdi Information Industry Development Area (2. Holiday Inn Express) – Xisanqi (beside Xin Long Building) – Longze Station (Light Rail Line 13) – Longhuayuan (Longhuayuan Bus Stop, south side of Huilongguan West Street) – Juzhen Community – Tiantong Xiyuan Zone 1 (North Gate) – Baifang (Tiantong Dongyuan) – T2 – T1 – T3	5:10–20:50 every 40 minutes. Buses depart when full.
9	Tongzhou	T2 – T1 – T3 – Beiguan (opposite the Qitian Leyuan) – West Street – Beiyuan – Cuiping (Xinhualian Jiayuan) – Sunflower Hotel	7:00–24:00
9	Tongzhou	Sunflower Hotel in Tongzhou District – Cuiping Beili (west gate) – Beiyuan (east of subway station) – Beiguan (east of the road 300 meters south of Beiguan Bridge, Huangmuchang bus stop ) – T3 – T2 – T1	5:30–21:00 every 40 minutes. Buses depart when full.
10	Beijing South railway station	T3 – T2 – T1 – Guangqumen (Bus Stop under Guangqumen Bridge) – Tumor Hospital (Bus Stop Opposite to Beijing Tumor Hospital on the East Second Ring Road) – West of Yuting Bridge (Bus Stop) – Beijing South railway station	9:30–21:30 Every 30 minutes.
10	Beijing South railway station	Bus Station Lane A, North Exit of Beijing South railway station – T2 –T1 – T3	7:30–19:30 every 30 minutes. Buses depart when full.
11	Yizhuang	T2 –T1 – T3 – North of Yaowahu Bridge (Redstar Macalline on the East Fourth Ring Road) –- Xiaowuji (Auto Parts Market) – West Road of Yizhuang North Ring (Huaguan Supermarket) –- Taihe Stop (No.7 Road of Yizhuang Boxing)	18:00
11	Yizhuang	Taihe Stop (No.7 Road of Yizhuang Boxing) – West Road of Yizhuang North Ring (Huaguan Supermarket) – T2 –T1 – T3	8:00

=== Nanyuan Airport– City Route ===
Destination	Stops	Hours
Xidan	Nanyuan Airport – Dahongmen (Bus Stop opposite to the Clothing Market) – Tiantan Hospital (Bus Stop) – Qianmen – Xidan	9:00 a.m. to last domestic arrival; depart when full
Nanyuan Airport	Xidan(Civil Aviation Building) – Nanyuan Airport	6:00–19:00, depart every 60 minutes.

=== Capital Airport to other cities ===
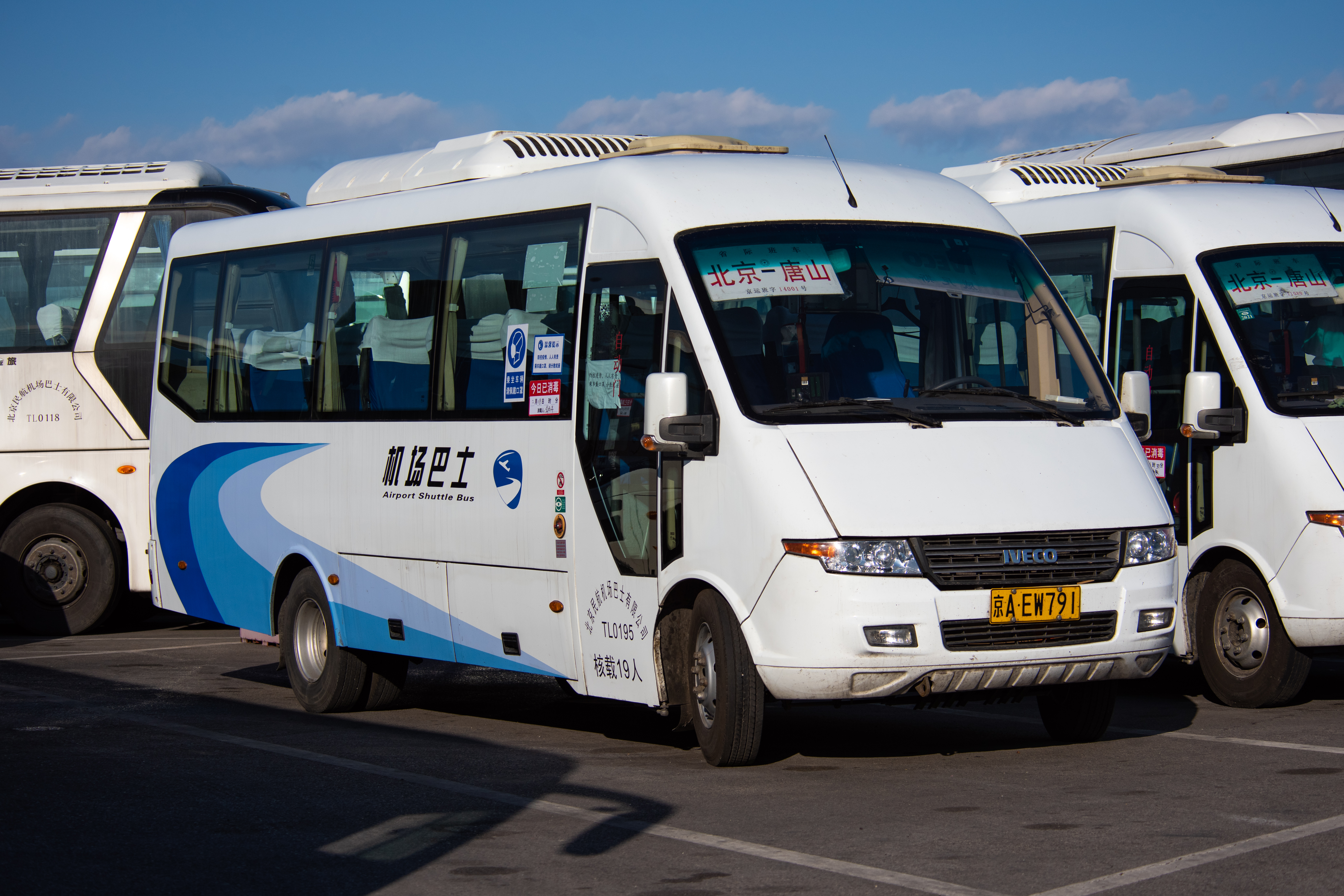
Bus from Capital Airport to Tangshan

Destination	Point of departure	Time of first & last departure	Trip length	Fare	Local Tel.
Tianjin	T2: Gate 15; T3: Gate 3	7:30-22:00	2.5 hours	¥82	+86-22-23050530
Tianjin	northeast corner of the intersection between Hongqi Rd. and Anshan West Ave.	4:00-18:00	2.5 hours	¥82	+86-22-23050530
Qinhuangdao	T2: Gate 15; T3: Gate 3	9:30-21:00	4 hours	¥140	+86-335-3067010
Qinhuangdao	Qinhuangdao Longteng Long Distance Bus Station	5:00-17:00	4 hours	¥140	+86-335-3067010
Tanggu	T2: Gate 15; T3: Gate 3	10:30 – 20:30 (4 per day)	3 hours	¥94	+86-22-66580000
Tanggu	Tanggu Bus Terminal	6:00 – 16:00 (4 per day)	3 hours	¥94	+86-22-66580000
Langfang	T2: Gate 15; T3: Gate 3	11:00 – 23:00	2 hours	¥40	+86-316-5213320
Langfang	Langfang Bus Terminal	8:00 – 18:00	2 hours	¥40	+86-316-5213320
Baoding	T2: Gate 15; T3: Gate 3	10:10 – 18:10 (five per day)	3 hours	¥95	+86-312-2018080
Baoding	Baoding City Terminal, Golden Sun Tours south of train station	5:00 – 14:00 (five per day)	3 hours	¥95	+86-312-2018080
Tangshan	T2: Gate 15; T3: Gate 3	10:15 – 18:15 (five per day)	2.5 hours	¥80	+86-312-2018080
Tangshan	West Staff Terminal in Tangshan, North part of Zhan Qian Road, Lu Bei Area	7:00 – 14:00 (five per day)	2.5 hours	¥80	+86-312-2018080

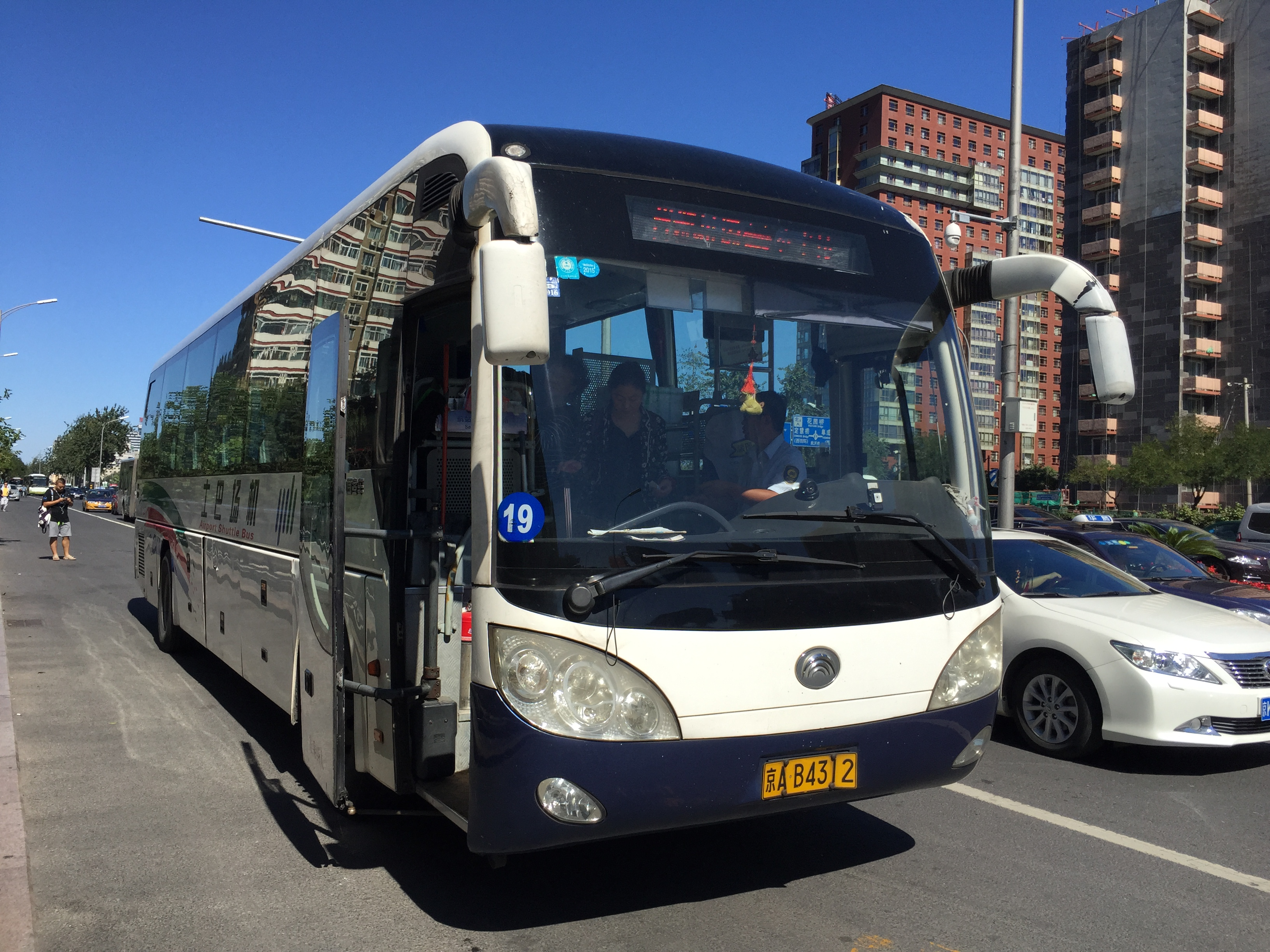
A Yutong ZK6126HA unloading passengers at Gongzhufen as Route 4.

== See also ==
- Capital Airport Express
- Beijing Bus
