= Dongdan, Beijing =

Crossing in eastern Beijing

Coordinates: 39°54′25″N 116°24′42″E

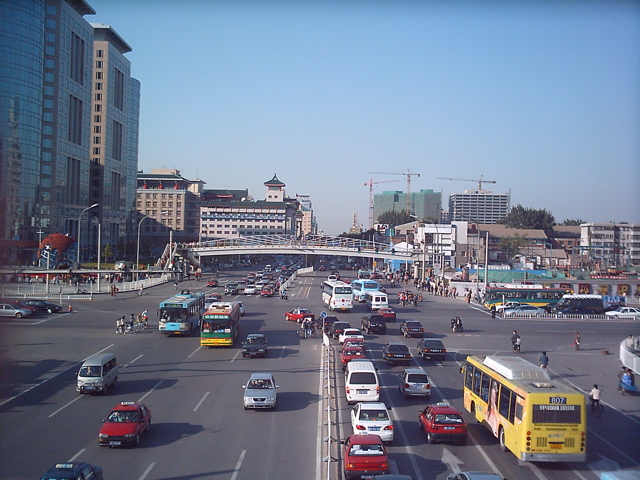
Dongdan Crossing (October 2004 image)

Dongdan (Chinese: 东单; pinyin: Dōngdān), literally "Eastern Single" or "Eastern Single Sign Gate" is the name of a crossing on Beijing's Chang'an Avenue and surrounding neighborhood. The name is derived from the single paifang or Chinese sign gate that once marked the intersection. In the checkerboard layout of Beijing, the Dongdan intersection in Dongcheng District to the east of the city centre, is balanced by Xidan or the "Western Single" in Xicheng District to the west of city centre. Dongdan and Xidan were traditionally market centers.

In the Dongdan region one finds the Oriental Plaza, and Dongdan North Street, termed "silver street" for being next to (and slightly inferior to) Wangfujing Street. Like Wangfujing, Dongdan is also home to many shops.

== Local transit ==
The Beijing Subway has a stop at Dongdan for both Line 1 and Line 5. Bus and Trolleybus 106, 108, 110, 111, 116, 684, 685 and 夜10 stop at Dongdan Intersection North (东单路口北) on Dongdan North Street. Bus 41, 127, 684, and 685 stop at Dongdan Intersection South (东单路口南) on Chongwenmennei Street. On Chang'an Avenue, Bus 1, 52, and 99 stop at Dongdan Intersection West (东单路口西). Bus 25, 39, 夜1, 夜10, and 夜17 stop at Dongdan Intersection East (东单路口东).

== See also ==
- Dongsi Subdistrict, Beijing
