= Chang'an Avenue =

Road in Beijing, China

Coordinates: 39.90757°N 116.3970°E

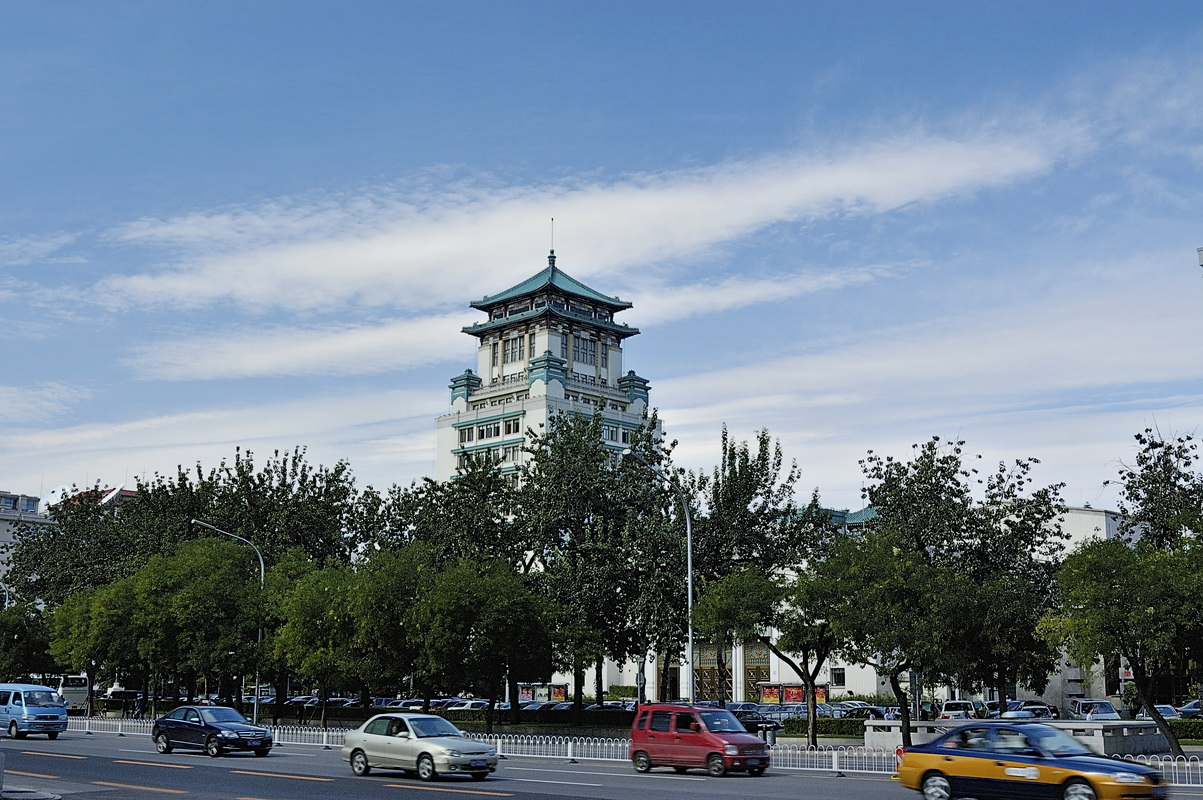
Chang'an Avenue and Cultural Palace of Nationalities

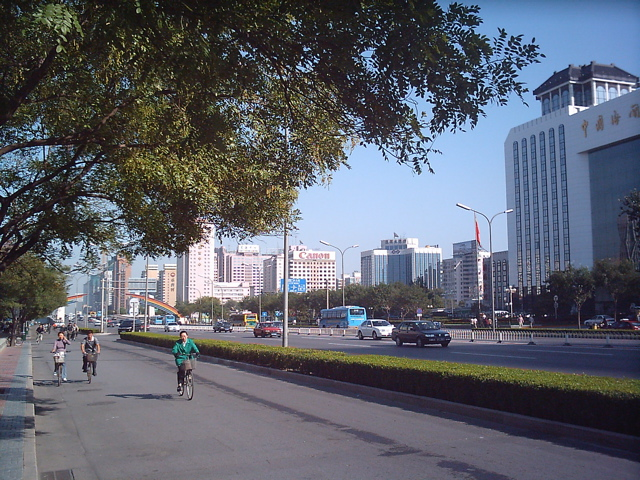
Chang'an Avenue

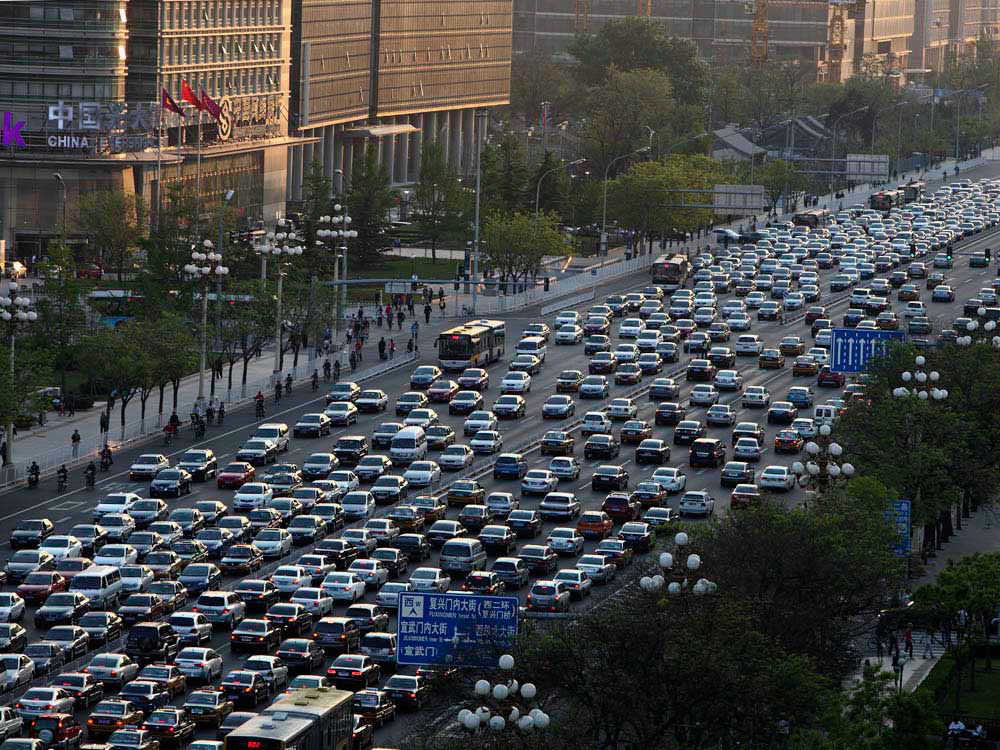
Evening traffic around Chang'an Avenue

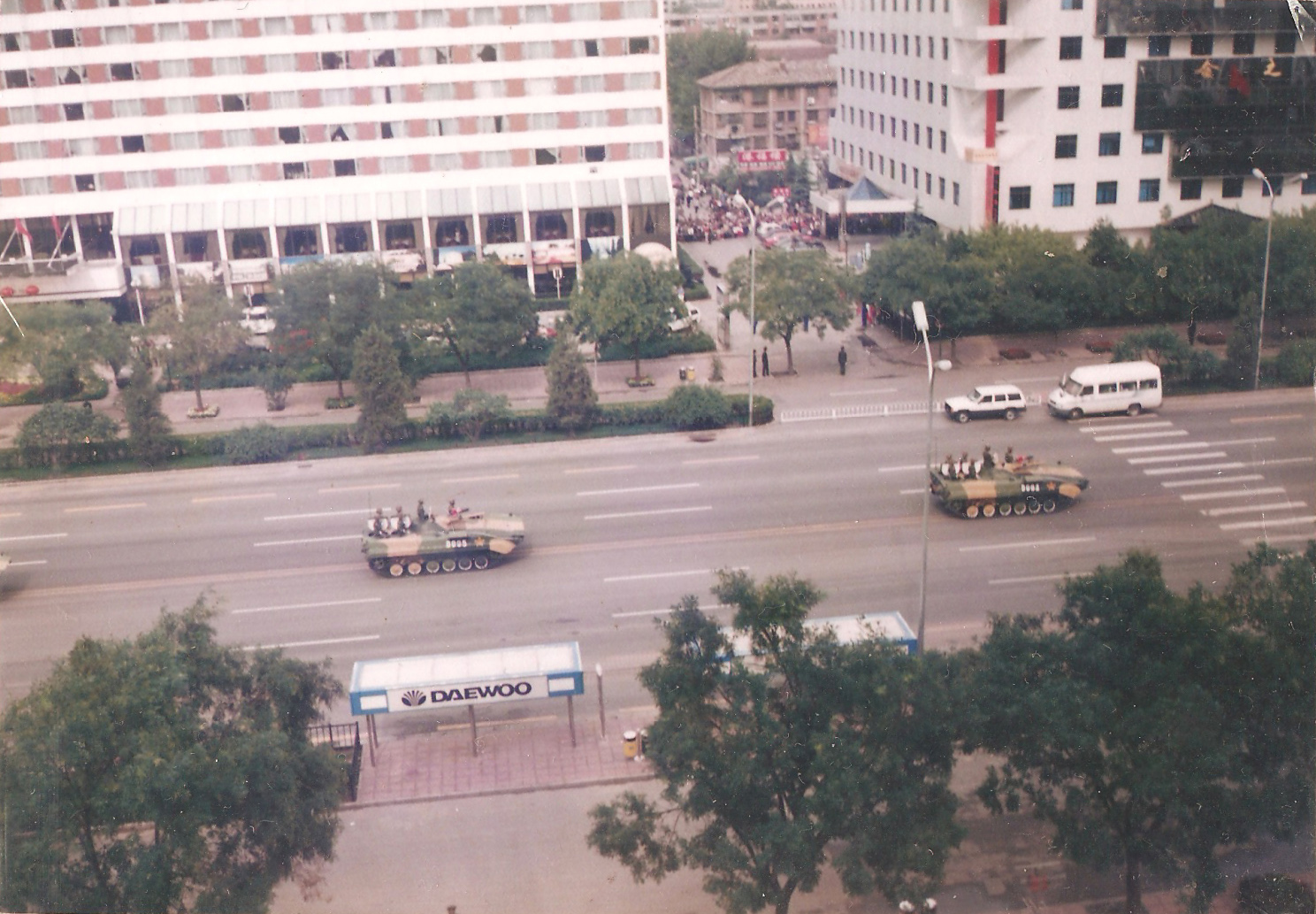
Chang'an Avenue hosts military parades. Here are armoured fighting vehicles leaving Tian'anmen Square during the 1999 National Day parade.

Chang'an Avenue (Chinese: 长安街; pinyin: Cháng'ān Jiē; lit. 'Eternal Peace Street') is a major thoroughfare in Beijing, China.

Chang'an (Chinese: 长安; pinyin: Cháng'ān) is also the old name for Xi'an which was the capital of China during the Western Han dynasty, the Tang dynasty and other periods. The Avenue has also been referred to as the Shili Changjie (Chinese: 十里长街; pinyin: Shílǐ Chǎngjiē), meaning the Ten Li Long Street, China's No. 1 Avenue and No. 1 Avenue of the Divine Land. "Chang'an Avenue" is often used as a synecdoche for the government in Beijing, akin to using "the Beltway" to refer to the American federal government.

Chang'an Avenue starts from Dongdan in the east and ends at Xidan in the west. Tiananmen and Tiananmen Square are located at the north and south of the center of the Avenue, respectively. The Avenue consists of two parts, West Chang'an Avenue and East Chang'an Avenue. The extension line extends east–west with Tiananmen Square as the center, extends westward to Shougang area, Yongding River and Western Hills, and extends eastward to Beijing City Sub-center, Grand Canal and Chaobai River. The core area of Chang'an Avenue and its extension is between Guomao Bridge of East Third Ring Road and Xinxing Bridge of West Third Ring Road (including Tiananmen area).

== History ==
The East and West Chang'an Streets were built as part of the Imperial City of Beijing. East Chang'an Street originally ran from the Left Chang'an Gate (on the east side of the square before Tian'anmen gate) to the Dongdan gate, and West Chang'an Street originally ran from the Right Chang'an Gate (on the west side of the same square) to the Xidan gate. The north side of the square, between the two Chang'an Gates, became a road after 1912 and was named "Zhongshan Road", after Sun Yat-sen. In 1940, the Inner City wall was breached at Jianguomen and Fuxingmen respectively, due east and west of the ends of the East and West Chang'an Street. Streets extending from the ends of the two Chang'an Streets were widened to become Jianguomen Inner and Outer Streets and Fuxingmen Inner and Outer Streets. The two Chang'an Streets thus became part of a major thoroughfare into and out of the Inner City, now considered the "extended" Chang'an Avenue. The two Chang'an Gates were demolished in 1952 to expand Tiananmen Square, after which the two Chang'an Streets and Zhongshan Road were merged, becoming a singular "Chang'an Avenue".

In 2009 the road was widened to 10 lanes, as part of the 60th anniversary of the founding of the People's Republic of China.

== Significance ==
Chang'an Avenue is the road directly before Tian'anmen gate and to the north of Tian'anmen Square. Because of its location, Chang'an Avenue has been associated with a number of important events in Chinese history, such as the 1989 Tiananmen Square protests and massacre (including the famous confrontation of the Tank Man), the May 4th Movement and the funeral procession of Zhou Enlai. During important celebrations in the People's Republic of China, military parades are conducted on Chang'an Avenue, with the procession travelling from East to West along the avenue, passing before Tiananmen gate. For this reason, the avenue is surfaced with reinforced concrete, to prevent tanks and other heavy vehicles from damaging the surface.

Located along Chang'an Avenue and near Tian'anmen Square are the Great Hall of the People, Zhongnanhai, and central government buildings. The National Museum of China, National Centre for the Performing Arts, Wangfujing, Beijing Concert Hall, the headquarters of the central bank of China, the People's Bank of China, and the Cultural Palace of Nationalities are also on Chang'an Avenue. Both the Beijing railway station and Beijing west railway station are located near Chang'an Avenue. Line 1 of the Beijing Subway runs under Chang'an Avenue.

Because of its sensitive location, special regulations apply to Chang'an Avenue. For example, trucks and freight vehicles are banned day and night, and no commercial advertising is allowed on the street.

== Sections ==
Note: This article considers Chang'an Avenue as the major through road from the W. 5th Ring Road through to the E. 5th Ring Road, which defines larger urban Beijing.

- Fuxing Road
- Fuxingmen Outer Street
- Fuxingmen Inner Street
- West Chang'an Avenue
- East Chang'an Avenue
- Jianguomen Inner Street
- Jianguomen Outer Street
- Jianguo Road
- Jingtong Expressway
- Tongyan Expressway

== See also ==
- History of Beijing
