= CVU Awards =

Architectural award

- Awarded for: Projects and individuals that have made extraordinary contributions to the advancement of tall buildings and the urban environment, and that achieve sustainability at the highest and broadest level.
- Country: United States
- Presented by: Council on Vertical Urbanism
- First award: 2002
- Website: verticalurbanism.org/get-involved/awards-program/

The CVU Awards (formerly known as Tall Building Awards or CTBUH Awards) recognizes projects and individuals who have made an extraordinary contribution to the advancement of tall buildings and urban environment, as well as achieving sustainability at the highest and broadest level. The annual awards are judged by an independent panel of experts commissioned by the Council on Vertical Urbanism (CVU), a non-profit organization headquartered in Chicago, Illinois. As of 2019, there are two individual lifetime achievement awards, The Lynn S. Beedle Lifetime Achievement Award and Fazlur Khan Lifetime Achievement Medal, and several categorical awards for projects and structures.

In 2019 the CTBUH award categories were changed from buildings in specific regions to buildings based on height, region, function, innovation, construction, design, engineering, and safety. The most prestigious annual award, the Overall Best Tall Building Worldwide is awarded to one of the specific categorical winners. In 2010, the CTBUH conferred the Global Icon Award, an award for a unique tall building with a profound impact both locally and globally, to the Burj Khalifa in Dubai, United Arab Emirates.

== Awards criteria ==
=== Individual awards ===
Originally conceived in 2002, the first CTBUH Award, the Lynn S. Beedle Lifetime Achievement Award recognizes an individual who has made extraordinary contributions to the advancement of tall buildings and the urban environment during his or her professional career. The 2002 award was given and named after Lynn S. Beedle, an American structural engineer and founder of the Council on Tall Buildings And Urban Habitat. In 2004 a second lifetime award was created, the Fazlur R. Kahn Lifetime Award, named after Bangladeshi-American structural engineer and architect Fazlur Rahman Khan, which recognizes an individual for demonstrated excellence in technical design and/or research that has made a significant contribution to a discipline for the design of tall buildings and the built urban environment. The award was first given in 2004 to Leslie E. Robertson, an American engineer and lead structural engineer of the Twin Towers of the original World Trade Center in New York City.

Beginning in 2006 the CTBUH Awards began recognizing CTBUH Fellows for their contribution to the Council over an extended period of time, and in recognition of their work and the sharing of their knowledge in the design and construction of tall buildings and the urban habitat. The first CTBUH Fellows in 2006 were A. Eugene Kohn, Charles A. DeBenedittis, Gilberto do Valle, and Henry Jack Cowan.

=== Structural awards ===
The Council on Tall Buildings and Urban Habitat added two categories starting in 2007 which recognize completed structures for excellence. The Best Tall Building Award recognizes projects that have made extraordinary contributions to the advancement of tall buildings and the urban environment, and that achieve sustainability and wellness at the highest and broadest level. The Beetham Tower, completed in 2006 in Manchester, England was the first recipient of the award. The second award added in 2007 was the Best Sustainable Building Award, which was awarded to Hearst Tower, completed in 2006 in New York City.

In 2008, the second year of CTBUH Awards for structures, the Council on Tall Buildings and Urban Habitat added four geographical categories for the best tall building, the regions were Americas (North and South), Asia & Australasia, Europe, and Middle East & Africa. The Best Tall Building Award was then awarded to one of the regional award winners. In 2008 the CTBUH Best Tall Building Award winners were New York Times Building in New York City; Shanghai World Financial Center in Shanghai, China; 51 Lime Street in London, England; and Bahrain World Trade Center in Manama, Bahrain. The Best Tall Building Award Winner Worldwide was announced as the Asia & Australasia winner the Shanghai World Financial Center. The Best Tall Building Award categories based on the four regions would remain in place until 2019, when new categories were added based on sustainability and building height.

In 2013 a new 10 Year Award was added. In 2014 the Urban Habitat and Performance awards were issued for the first time. The CTBUH uses the following award criteria for skyscrapers.

- The project must be completed and occupied (topped out architecturally, fully clad, and at least partially occupied), no earlier than 1 January of the previous year, and no later than 1 October of the current awards year.
- The project advanced architectural form, structure, building systems, sustainable design strategies, and provides life safety for its occupants.
- The project must exhibited sustainable qualities at a broadest level.
- The project must have achieved a high standard of excellence and quality.
- The site planning and response to its immediate context must ensure rich and meaningful urban environments.
- The contributions of the project should be generally consistent with the values and mission of the Council on Tall Buildings and Urban Habitat (CTBUH).

The criteria for the Innovation Award:

- Demonstrate a specific area of innovation within design or construction.
- Should be applicable to other tall building projects.
- Single innovative element (single project can be nominated multiple times for different innovations)
- Building can also be submitted for Best Tall Building Award

The criteria for the 10 Year Award:

- Demonstrate successful performance over time.
- Must have been completed between 10–12 years since the current award year (In the inaugural year submissions of buildings completed between 10–15 years since the current award year will be considered).

The Council on Tall Buildings and Urban Habitat bestowed a new award for Burj Khalifa at its annual "Best Tall Buildings Awards Ceremony" on 25 October 2010 when Burj Khalifa honored as first recipient of CTBUH's new Tall Building "Global Icon" Award. According to CTBUH the new "Global Icon" award recognizes those very special supertall skyscrapers that make a profound impact, not only on the local or regional context, but on the genre of tall buildings globally. Which is innovative in planning, design and execution, the building must have influenced and re-shaped the field of tall building architecture, engineering, and urban planning. It is intended that the award will only be conferred on an occasional basis, when merited by an exceptional project perhaps every ten or fifteen years.

Former CTBUH Awards Chair Gordon Gill, of Adrian Smith + Gordon Gill Architecture said:

"There was discussion amongst members of the jury that the existing 'Best Tall Building of the Year' award was not really appropriate for the Burj khalifa. We are talking about a building here that has changed the landscape of what is possible in architecture a building that became internationally recognized as an icon long before it was even completed. 'Building of the Century' was thought a more appropriate title for it."

== Award winners ==
=== Individual award winners ===
Year	Lynn S. Beedle Lifetime Achievement Award	Fazlur Khan Lifetime Achievement Medal
2002	Lynn S. Beedle	N/A
2003	Charles DeBenedittis	N/A
2004	Gerald D. Hines	Leslie E. Robertson
2005	Alan Garnett Davenport	Werner Sobek
2006	Ken Yeang	Srinivasa Iyengar
2007	Lord Norman Foster	Farzad Naeim
2008	César Pelli	William F. Baker
2009	John C. Portman Jr.	Prabodh V. Banavalkar
2010	William Pedersen	Ysrael Seinuk
2011	Adrian Smith	Akira Wada
2012	Helmut Jahn	Charles Thornton & Richard Tomasetti
2013	Henry N. Cobb	Clyde N. Baker Jr.
2014	Douglas Durst	Peter Irwin
2015	Minoru Mori	Nicholas E. Billotti
2016	Cheong Koon Hean	Ron Klemencic
2018	Larry Silverstein	Áine Brazil
2019	James Goettsch	Israel David
2020	Moshe Safdie	Wuren Wang

=== Structural awards ===
==== 2007 ====
Award	Building/Person	Location
Best Tall Building Award	The Beetham Hilton Tower	(United Kingdom) Manchester
Best Sustainable Tall Building	Hearst Tower	(United States) New York City

==== 2008 ====
Award	Building/Person	Location
Best Tall Building Overall Award	Shanghai World Financial Center	(China) Shanghai
Best Tall Building Award Americas	The New York Times Building	(United States) New York City
Best Tall Building Award Asia and Australasia	Shanghai World Financial Center	(China) Shanghai
Best Tall Building Award Europe	51 Lime Street	(United Kingdom) London
Best Tall Building Award – Middle East & Africa	Bahrain World Trade Center	(Bahrain) Manama

==== 2009 ====
Award	Building/Person	Location
Best Tall Building Overall Award	Linked Hybrid Building	(China) Beijing
Best Tall Building Award Americas	Manitoba Hydro Tower	(Canada) Winnipeg
Best Tall Building Award Asia and Australasia	Linked Hybrid Building	(China) Beijing
Best Tall Building Award Europe	Broadgate Tower	(United Kingdom) London
Best Tall Building Award Middle East & Africa	Tornado Tower	(Qatar) Doha

==== 2010 ====
Award	Building/Person	Location
Best Tall Building Overall	Broadcasting Place	(United Kingdom) Leeds
Best Tall Building Americas	Bank of America Tower	(United States) New York City
Best Tall Building Asia & Australasia	Pinnacle @ Duxton	Singapore
Best Tall Building Europe	Broadcasting Place	(United Kingdom) Leeds
Best Tall Building Middle East & Africa	Burj Khalifa	(United Arab Emirates) Dubai
Global Icon Award	Burj Khalifa	(United Arab Emirates) Dubai

==== 2011 ====
The Council on Tall Buildings and Urban Habitat announced the winners of its annual "Best Tall Building" awards for 2011 on June 15, 2011.

Award	Building/Person	Location
Best Tall Building Overall	KfW Westarkade	(Germany) Frankfurt
Best Tall Building Americas	8 Spruce Street	(United States) New York City
Best Tall Building Asia & Australasia	Guangzhou International Finance Center	(China) Guangzhou
Best Tall Building Europe	KfW Westarkade	(Germany) Frankfurt
Best Tall Building Middle East & Africa	The Index	(United Arab Emirates) Dubai

==== 2012 ====
Award	Building/Person	Location
Best Tall Building Overall	Doha Tower	(Qatar) Doha
Best Tall Building Americas	Absolute Towers	(Canada) Mississauga
Best Tall Building Asia & Australasia	1 Bligh Street	(Australia) Sydney
Best Tall Building Europe	Palazzo Lombardia	(Italy) Milan
Best Tall Building Middle East & Africa	Doha Tower	(Qatar) Doha
Tall Building Innovation Award	Al Bahar Towers	(United Arab Emirates) Abu Dhabi

==== 2013 ====
Award	Building/Person	Location
Best Tall Building Overall	CCTV Headquarters	(China) Beijing
Best Tall Building Americas	The Bow	(Canada) Calgary
Best Tall Building Asia & Australasia	CCTV Headquarters	(China) Beijing
Best Tall Building Europe	The Shard	(United Kingdom) London
Best Tall Building Middle East & Africa	Sowwah Square	(United Arab Emirates) Abu Dhabi
Tall Building Innovation Award (Co-Winners)	Broad Sustainable Building (BSB) Prefabricated Construction Process	(China) Changsha
	KONE UltraRope	(Finland) Espoo
10 Year Award	30 St Mary Axe	(United Kingdom) London

==== 2014 ====
Award	Building/Person	Location
Best Tall Building Overall	One Central Park	(Australia) Sydney
Best Tall Building Americas	Edith Green – Wendell Wyatt Federal Building	(United States) Portland
Best Tall Building Asia & Australasia	One Central Park	(Australia) Sydney
Best Tall Building Europe	De Rotterdam	(Netherlands) Rotterdam
Best Tall Building Middle East & Africa	Cayan Tower	(United Arab Emirates) Dubai
Urban Habitat Award	The Interlace	Singapore
10 Year Award	Post Tower	(Germany) Bonn
Tall Building Innovation Award	BioSkin	
Performance Award	International Commerce Centre	Hong Kong

==== 2015 ====
Award	Building/Person	Location
Best Tall Building Overall	Bosco Verticale	(Italy) Milan
Best Tall Building Americas	One World Trade Center	(United States) New York City
Best Tall Building Asia & Australasia	CapitaGreen	Singapore
Best Tall Building Europe	Bosco Verticale	(Italy) Milan
Best Tall Building Middle East & Africa	Burj Mohammed Bin Rashid Tower	(United Arab Emirates) Abu Dhabi
Urban Habitat Award	PARKROYAL on Pickering	Singapore
10 Year Award	Turning Torso	(Sweden) Malmö
Tall Building Innovation Award	HOLEDECK®	
Performance Award	Chifley Tower	(Australia) Sydney

==== 2016 ====
Award	Building/Person	Location
Best Tall Building Overall	Shanghai Tower	(China) Shanghai
Best Tall Building Americas	VIA 57 West	(United States) New York City
Best Tall Building Asia & Australasia	Shanghai Tower	(China) Shanghai
Best Tall Building Europe	The White Walls	(Cyprus) Nicosia
Best Tall Building Middle East & Africa	The Cube	(Lebanon) Beirut
Urban Habitat Award	Wuhan Tiandi Site A	(China) Wuhan
10 Year Award	Hearst Tower	(United States) New York City
Tall Building Innovation Award	Pin-Fuse	
Performance Award	TAIPEI 101	(Taiwan) Taipei

==== 2018 ====
Award	Building/Person	Location
Best Tall Building Overall	Oasia Hotel Downtown	Singapore
Best Tall Building Americas	American Copper Buildings	(United States) New York City
Best Tall Building Asia & Australasia	Oasia Hotel Downtown	Singapore
Best Tall Building Europe	The Silo	(Denmark) Copenhagen
Best Tall Building Middle East & Africa	Zeitz MOCAA	(South Africa) Cape Town
Urban Habitat Award	World Trade Center Master Plan	(United States) New York City
10 Year Award	Shanghai World Financial Center	(China) Shanghai
Tall Building Innovation Award	MULTI	
Construction Award	The EY Centre	(Australia) Sydney

==== 2019 ====
Award	Building/Person	Location
Best Tall Building Worldwide	Salesforce Tower	(United States) San Francisco
Best Tall Building under 100 meters	Forma Itaim	(Brazil) São Paulo
Best Tall Building 100–199 meters	Amorepacific Headquarters	(South Korea) Seoul
Best Tall Building 200–299 meters	Shenzhen Energy Headquarters	(China) Shenzhen
Best Tall Building 300–399 meters	Salesforce Tower	(United States) San Francisco
Best Tall Building 400 meters and above	Ping An Finance Center	(China) Shenzhen
Best Tall Office Building	European Patent Office	(Netherlands) Rijswijk
Best Tall Residential or Hotel Building	277 Fifth Avenue	(United States) New York City
Best Tall Mixed-Use Building	Kampung Admiralty	Singapore
Urban Habitat - Single Site Scale	Kampung Admiralty	Singapore
Urban Habitat - District/Master Plan Scale	Central Park, Sydney	(Australia) Sydney
Renovation Award	CHAO Hotel	(China) Beijing
Interior Space Award	Amorepacific Headquarters	(South Korea) Seoul
Structural Engineering Award	181 Fremont	(United States) San Francisco
MEP Engineering Award	Britam Tower	(Kenya) Nairobi
Geotechnical Engineering Award	181 Fremont	(United States) San Francisco
Façade Engineering Award	Azrieli Sarona Tower	(Israel) Tel Aviv
Fire & Risk Engineering Award	Morpheus	Macau
10 Year Award	The Pinnacle@Duxton	Singapore
Tall Building Innovation Award	Viscoelastic Coupling Damper (VCD)	
Construction Award	Atira La Trobe Street	(Australia) Melbourne

==== 2021 ====
Award	Building/Person	Location
Best Tall Building Worldwide	Vancouver House	(Canada) Vancouver
Best Tall Building Americas	Comcast Technology Center	(United States) Philadelphia
Best Tall Building Asia	Asia Financial Center	(China) Beijing
Best Tall Building Europe	White Tree	(France) Montpellier
Best Tall Building Middle East & Africa	ToHA Tower 1	(Israel) Tel Aviv
Best Tall Building Oceania	ARC by Crown Group	(Australia) Sydney
Best Tall Building under 100 meters	25 King	(Australia) Brisbane
Best Tall Building 100–199 meters	Vancouver House	(Canada) Vancouver
Best Tall Building 200–299 meters	Telus Sky	(Canada) Calgary
Best Tall Building 300–399 meters	Raffles City Chongqing	(China) Chongqing
Best Tall Building 400 meters and above	CITIC Tower	(China) Beijing
Best Tall Office Building	ToHA Tower 1	(Israel) Tel Aviv
Best Tall Residential or Hotel Building	Vancouver House	(Canada) Vancouver
Best Tall Mixed-Use Building	Daphne Cockwell Health Sciences Complex	(Canada) Toronto
Urban Habitat - Single Site Scale	DUO Tower	Singapore
Urban Habitat - District/Master Plan Scale	Hudson Yards - Eastern Yards	(United States) New York City
Renovation Award	Hanwha Headquarters	(South Korea) Seoul
Interior Design Award	UTS Central	(Australia) Sydney
Structure Award	Vancouver House	(Canada) Vancouver
MEP Engineering Award	Museum Tower Kyobashi	(Japan) Tokyo
Geotechnical Engineering Award	Claridge's	(United Kingdom) London
Façade Engineering Award	Lakhta Center	(Russia) St. Petersburg
Fire & Risk Engineering Award	CITIC Tower	(China) Beijing
10 Year Award 2020	Burj Khalifa	(United Arab Emirates) Dubai
10 Year Award 2021	1 Bligh Street	(Australia) Sydney
Innovation Award	Baker Brace	
Construction Award	Rainier Square Tower	(United States) Seattle

==== 2022 ====
Award	Building/Person	Location
Best Tall Building Worldwide	The David Rubenstein Forum	(United States) Chicago
Best Tall Building Americas	The David Rubenstein Forum	(United States) Chicago
Best Tall Building Asia	Qingdao Hai Tian	(China) Qingdao
Best Tall Building Europe	One Crown Place	(United Kingdom) London
Best Tall Building Middle East & Africa	Azrieli Town Tower	(Israel) Tel Aviv
Best Tall Building Oceania	Collins Arch	(Australia) Melbourne
Best Tall Building under 100 meters	The David Rubenstein Forum	(United States) Chicago
Best Tall Building 100–199 meters	Olderfleet	(Australia) Melbourne
Best Tall Building 200–299 meters	One Dalton Street	(United States) Boston
Best Tall Building 300–399 meters	The St. Regis Chicago	(United States) Chicago
Best Tall Building 400 meters and above	One Vanderbilt Avenue	(United States) New York City
Best Tall Office Building	Tour Trinity	(France) Paris
Best Tall Residential or Hotel Building	111 West 57th Street	(United States) New York City
Best Tall Mixed-Use Building	Collins Arch	(Australia) Melbourne
Best Tall Non-Building	CopenHill	(Denmark) Copenhagen
Urban Habitat - Single Site Scale	OōEli	(China) Hangzhou
Urban Habitat - District/Master Plan Scale	Wesley Place	(Australia) Melbourne
Renovation Award	55 Southbank Boulevard	(Australia) Melbourne
Interior Design Award	Beijing Lize Ping An Finance Centre	(China) Beijing
Structure Award	Ten Degrees Croydon	(United Kingdom) London
Geotechnical Engineering Award	18 Robinson	Singapore
Façade Engineering Award	Arlozorov 17	(Israel) Tel Aviv
Life Safety Design Award	Mjøstårnet	(Norway) Brumunddal
10 Year Award	De Karel Doorman	(Netherlands) Rotterdam
Innovation Award	HydroSKIN	
Construction Award	Sydney Greenland Centre	(Australia) Sydney
Systems Award	TrIIIple Towers	(Austria) Vienna

==== 2023 ====
Award	Building/Person	Location
Best Tall Building Worldwide	Quay Quarter Tower	(Australia) Sydney
Best Tall Building Special Recognition	DJI Sky City	(China) Shenzhen
Best Tall Building Americas	Engineering Laboratories - Pontificia Universidad Javeriana	(Colombia) Bogota
Best Tall Building Asia	CapitaSpring	Singapore
Best Tall Building Europe	Sara Kulturhus	(Sweden) Skellefteå
Best Tall Building Middle East & Africa	Atlantis The Royal Resort	(United Arab Emirates) Dubai
Best Tall Building Oceania	Quay Quarter Tower	(Australia) Sydney
Best Tall Building under 100 meters	Valley	(Netherlands) Amsterdam
Best Tall Building 100–199 meters	Lighthouse 2.0	(Denmark) Aarhus
Best Tall Building 200–299 meters	CapitaSpring	Singapore
Best Tall Building 300–399 meters	The Spiral	(United States) New York City
Best Tall Building 400 meters and above	Guangxi China Resources Tower	(China) Nanning
Best Tall Non-Building	Lotus Tower	(Sri Lanka) Colombo
Urban Habitat Award	Quay Quarter Lanes	(Australia) Sydney
10 Year Award	The Interlace	Singapore
Innovation Award	Urban Sequoia NOW	
Construction Award	Quay Quarter Tower	(Australia) Sydney
Systems Award	PingAn Property & Casualty Insurance Tower	(China) Shenzhen
Future Project Award	Atlassian Central	(Australia) Sydney
Repositioning Award	Quay Quarter Tower	(Australia) Sydney
Structure Award	Quay Quarter Tower	(Australia) Sydney
Space Within Award	Quay Quarter Tower	(Australia) Sydney

== See also ==
- Council on Tall Buildings and Urban Habitat
- List of architecture prizes
