= Ole Scheeren =

German architect

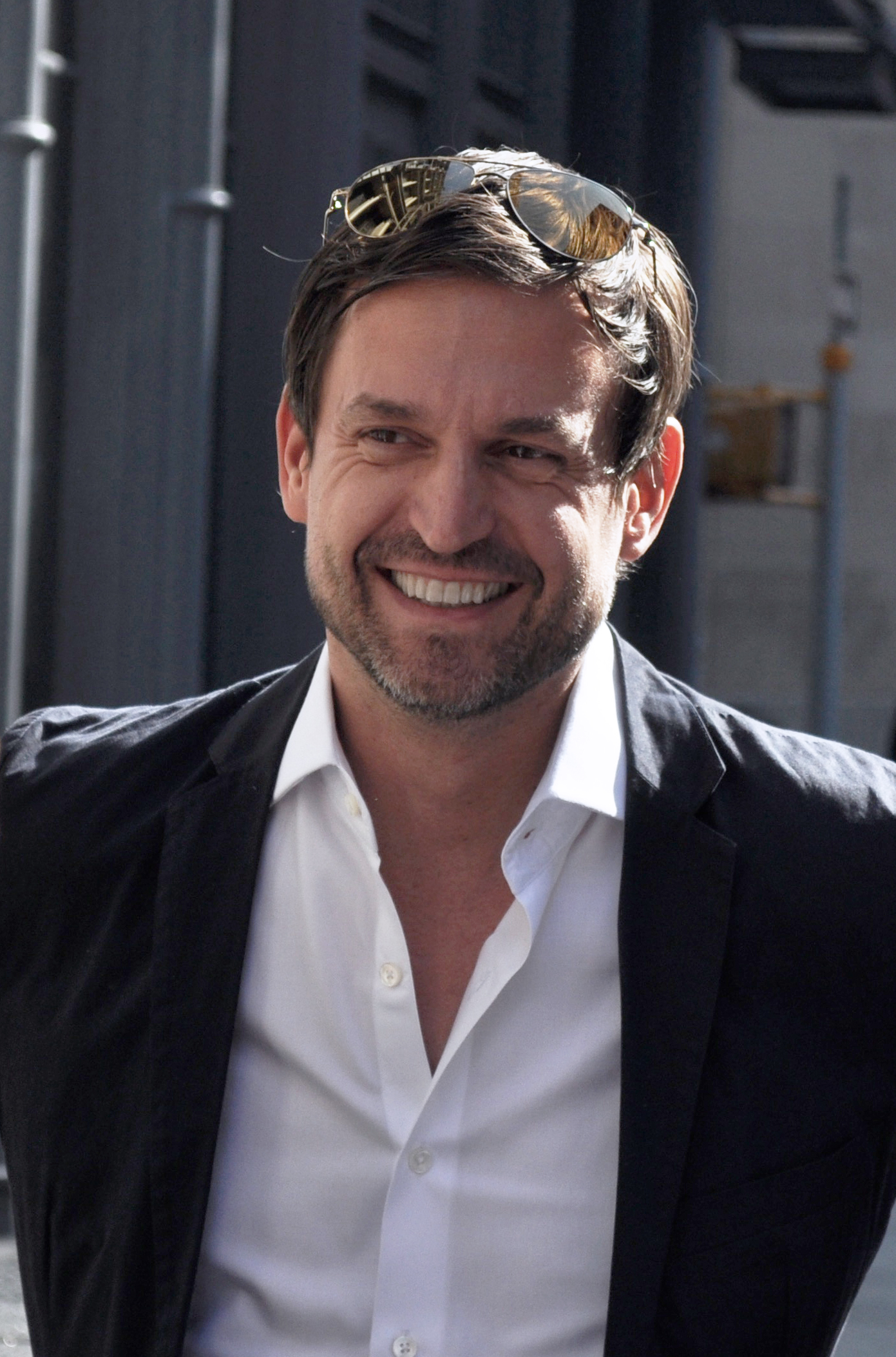
- Ole Scheeren in New York (September 2016)
- Born: 6 January 1971 (age 55); Karlsruhe, Germany
- Education: Architectural Association School of Architecture
- Occupation: Architect
- Parent: Dieter Scheeren (father)
- Website: buro-os.com

Ole Scheeren (born 6 January 1971) is a German architect, urbanist and principal of Büro Ole Scheeren with offices in Beijing, Hong Kong, London, Berlin and Bangkok and was a visiting professor at the University of Hong Kong from January 2010.

== Biography ==
=== Early life and career ===
Ole Scheeren is the son of the German architect Dieter Scheeren, who was a professor of architecture and civil engineering at the RheinMain University of Applied Sciences in Wiesbaden, Hesse.

Already at the age of 14 he was working at his father's office designing furniture and finished his first architectural project at the age of 21. As a twenty-year-old he traveled with his rucksack through rural China and lived there with the locals spending three months before his studies began. Ole Scheeren studied at the Institute of Technology (KIT) in Karlsruhe, at the École Polytechnique Fédérale (EPFL) in Lausanne and made a thesis at the Architectural Association School of Architecture in London receiving the RIBA Silver Medal in 2000 for his work called "MexT Project" which analysed social, territorial and economical phenomena in relation with space and architecture.

After working in Germany, New York and London, Ole Scheeren began his work at the Office for Metropolitan Architecture (OMA) in Rotterdam in 1995. In 2002 he became partner and director of the offices in Beijing and Hong Kong and responsible for the entire Asia business for more than 10 years.

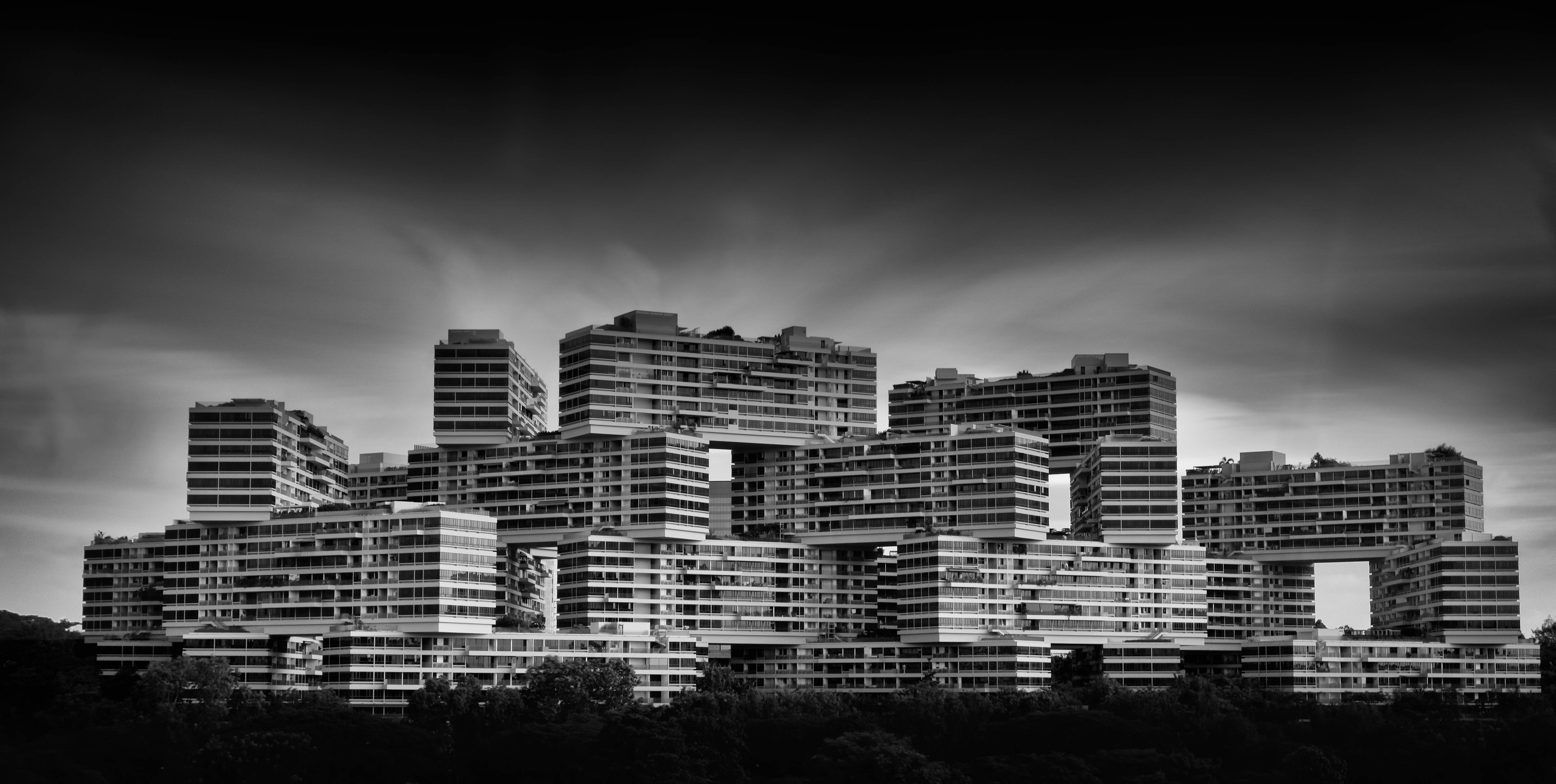
The Interlace in Singapore

As Partner-in-charge of OMA's largest project to date, he successfully led the realization of the China Central Television Station (CCTV) and the Television Cultural Centre (TVCC) in Beijing. His other projects include MahaNakhon, a 314-meter mixed-use tower in the city of Bangkok owned until 2017 by Pace Development; The Scotts Tower, featuring high-end apartments in Singapore; The Interlace, a 1040-unit residential complex in Singapore; a project for Shenzhen's new city centre; as well as the Taipei Performing Arts Center. He also directed OMA's work for Prada and completed the Prada Epicenters in New York (2001) and Los Angeles (2004). He also led numerous other projects including the Beijing Books Building, the Los Angeles County Museum of Art, the Leeum Cultural Center in Seoul, and a masterplan for Penang Island in Malaysia.

In March 2010, Ole Scheeren left OMA and started his own architecture firm named Büro Ole Scheeren.

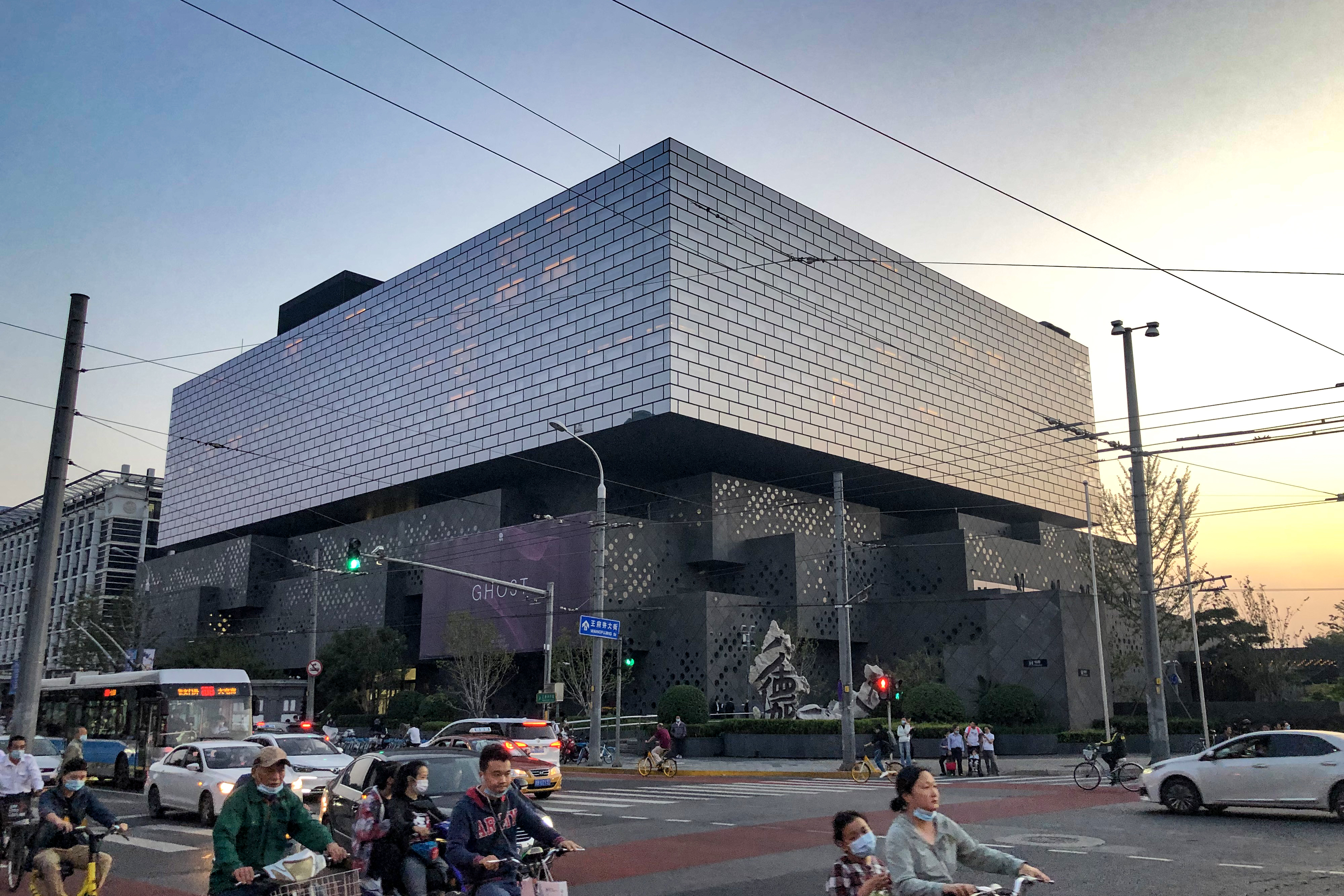
Guardian Art Center in Peking

As principal of Büro Ole Scheeren Group, Scheeren has completed a series of projects in Asia, including Guardian Art Center, the new exhibition space and headquarters for China's oldest art auction house constructed in close proximity to the Forbidden City in Beijing; DUO, a contemporary twin-tower mixed-use development comprising residences, offices, Andaz Singapore hotel and retail gallery in Singapore; and MahaNakhon, at 314-meters used to be Thailand's tallest tower and housing the Ritz-Carlton Residences.

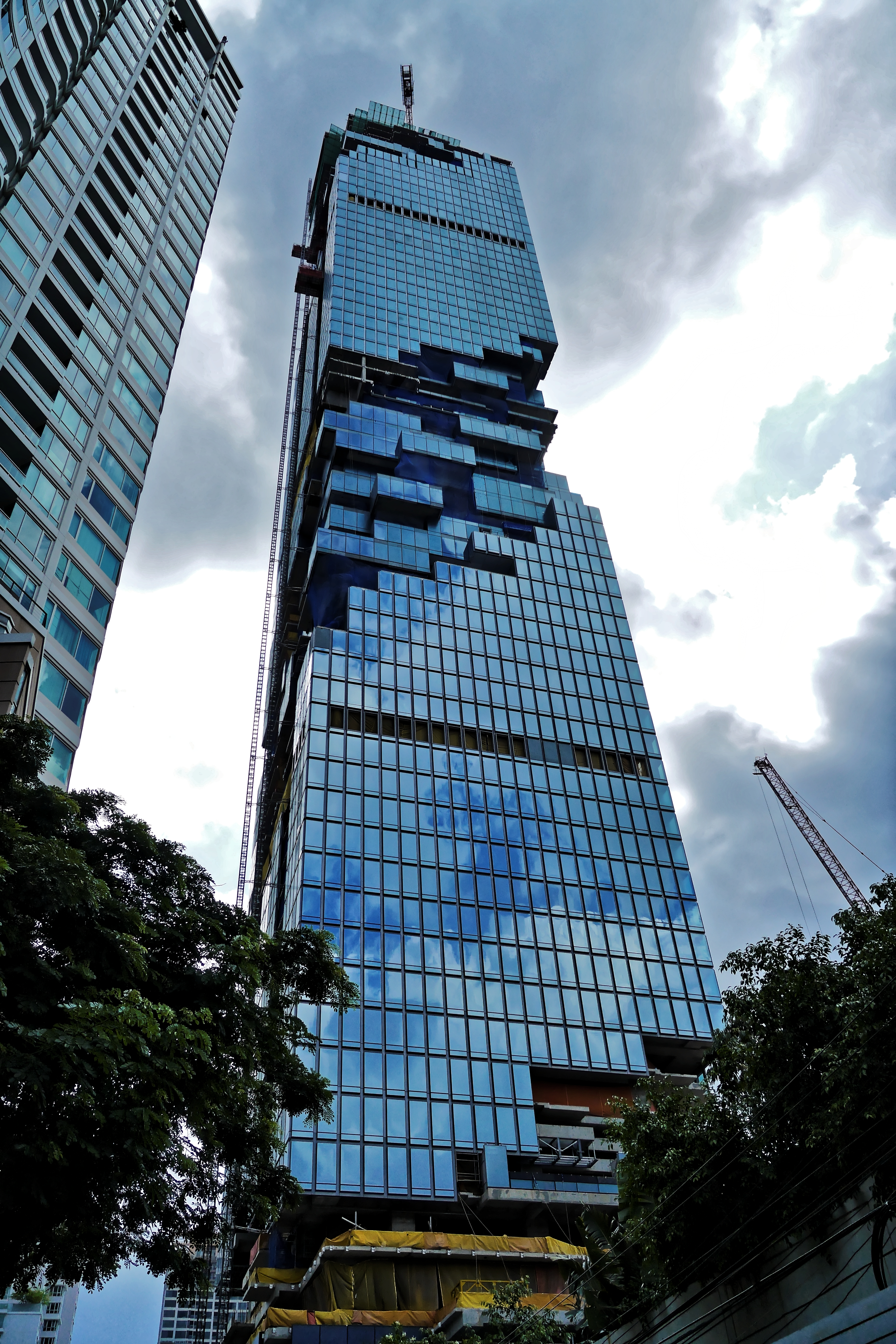
MahaNakhon project in Bangkok

Ole Scheeren currently has several projects under development around the world, including one in North America; Fifteen Fifteen by Ole Scheeren will be a high-rise tower adjacent to Vancouver's Crown Life Plaza. Empire City in Ho Chi Minh City, a large-scale, three tower complex that tops out at 333 meters is currently under construction. Further current projects under construction include the Headquarters named Shenzhen Wave in Shenzhen for the Chinese Tech-giant ZTE, the hotel-resort Sanya Horizons on the Hainan Islands in China, and the luxury boutique-hotel ABACA Resort in the Philippines.

Scheeren also delivered the scheme for redeveloping Riverpark Tower, the adaptive reuse of an existing office tower into a residential high-rise in Frankfurt, Germany. Empire City in Ho Chi Minh City, a large-scale, three tower complex that tops out at 333 meters.

Scheeren has contributed to various arts and culture projects and exhibitions throughout his career, including the International Highrise Award, Milan Triennale, China Design Now in London, Cities on the Move in London and Bangkok, Media City Seoul and the Rotterdam Film Festival. In 2006 he designed two exhibitions for the MoMA in New York and Beijing featuring the CCTV Headquarters project. He regularly lectures at various international institutions and conferences and serves on juries for awards and competitions. In December 2022 the ZKM | Center for Art and Media Karlsruhe dedicated the solo exhibition "ole scheeren : spaces of life" to the work of Ole Scheeren. Peter Weibel, the former artistic and scientific director of the ZKM, curated the show in close dialogue with the architect.

In September 2015 Scheeren held a speech at TED in London with the title "Why great architecture should tell a story?"

=== Personal life ===
Ole Scheeren has lived in Beijing since 2004 and dated Hong Kong actress Maggie Cheung from 2007 to 2011.

== Awards ==
- 2023: CTBUH 10 Years Award – The Interlace, Singapore
- 2021: CTBUH Urban Habitat Award 2021 – DUO, Singapore
- 2019: CTBUH Award of Excellence – DUO, Singapore and MahaNakhon, Bangkok
- 2015: World Building of the Year 2015 – The Interlace, Singapore
- 2015: Best Mixed-Use Development 2015 – MahaNakhon, Bangkok – Asia Pacific Property Awards
- 2014: Global Urban Habitat Award – The Interlace, Singapore – The Inaugural CTBUH Urban Habitat Award
- 2013: Best Tall Building Worldwide – CCTV Headquarters, Beijing – 12th Annual CTBUH Awards
- 2012: Best Futura Project – DUO, Singapore – MIPIM Asia Awards
- 2010: Green Mark Gold Plus – The Interlace, Singapore – Building and Construction Authority
- 2010: Best Architecture – The Interlace, Singapore – Asia Pacific Property Awards
- 2008: Architecture's Ten Best – CCTV Headquarters, Beijing – The New Yorker
- 2008: Best Building Site – CCTV Headquarters, Beijing – Wallpaper* Magazine
- 2008: Best New Global Design – CCTV Headquarters, Beijing – International Architecture Awards
- 2008: International Highrise Award, Frankfurt (finalist) – TVCC, Beijing
- 2007: The World's Most Ambitious Projects – CCTV Headquarters, Beijing – The Times
- 2000: RIBA Silver Medal (Royal Institute of British Architects)
- 1997: Studienstiftung des Deutschen Volkes
- 1990: Scheffel Medal (Student's Award in Baden-Württemberg)

== Filmography ==
- "Deutsche Architekten in China“, Germany, 2016, Director: Rainer Traube, Production: DW-TV (Deutsche Welle), Launch: 31 September 2016 by DW-TV (Deutsche Welle).
- "Megacitys – Bauen für Millionen“, Germany, 2013, 44 Min., Moderator: Ranga Yogeshwar, Production: WDR, Set: Quarks und Co, Launch: 25 June 2013 by WDR, Table of contents from WDR, online-Video from WDR.
- "Biennale Venezia 2012“, Germany, 2012, Director: Werner Herzog, Production: DW-TV (Deutsche Welle).
- "Faszination Wolkenkratzer - CCTV in Peking“, Germany, 2009, 30 min., Director: Horst Brandenburg, Production: ARTE Television, Launch: 5 July 2009 by ARTE Television.
