= The Interlace =

Apartment building in Singapore

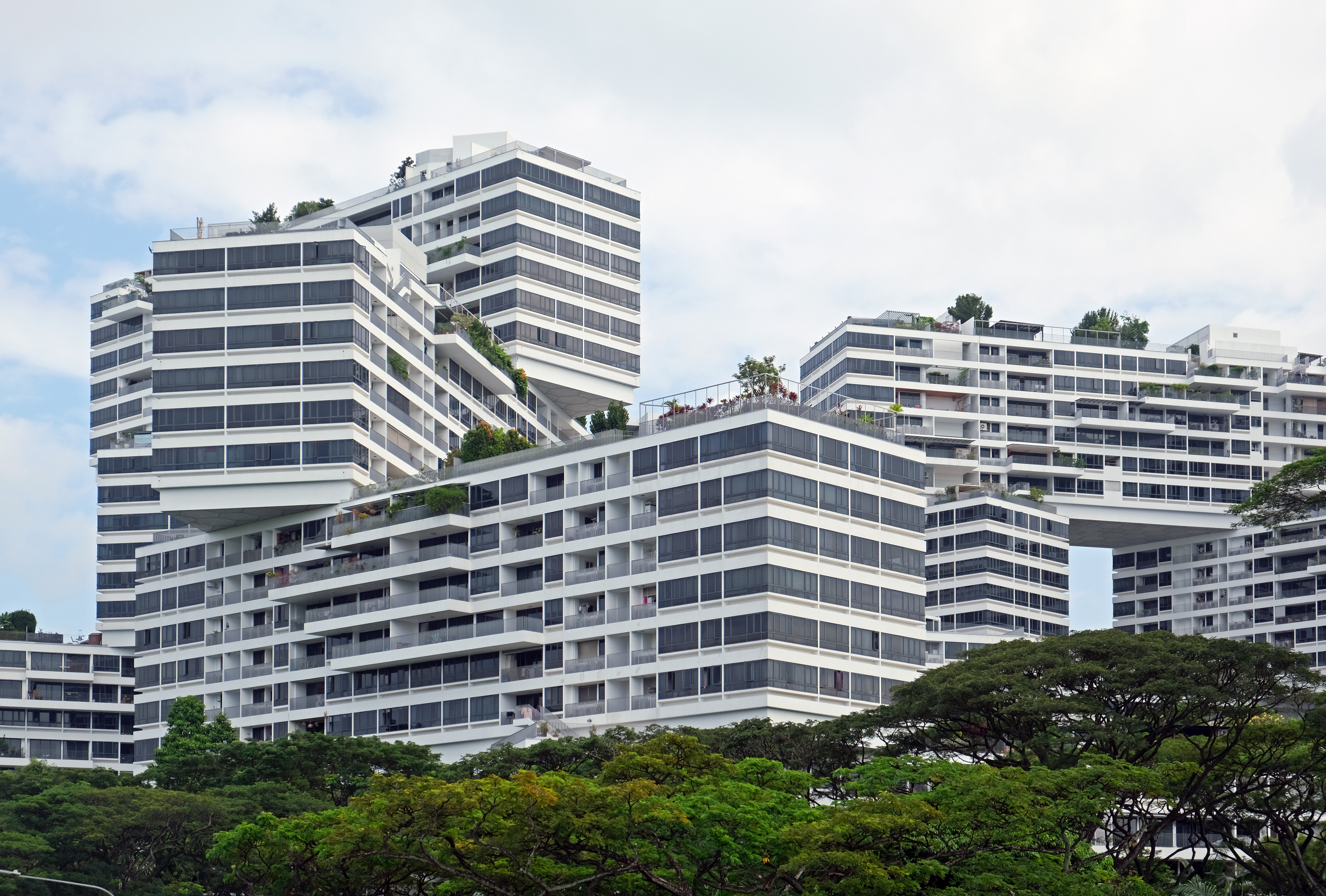
- The Interlace, as seen from the Alexandra Road in 2025

General information
- Architectural style: Contemporary architecture
- Location: 180 Depot Road, Singapore 109684, Singapore
- Coordinates: 1.28259°N 103.80324°E
- Construction started: 2007; 19 years ago
- Completed: 2013; 13 years ago

Height
- Architectural: 88.7 m (291 ft)
- Roof: 88.7 m (291 ft)

Technical details
- Floor count: 25
- Floor area: 170,000 m^{2} (1,800,000 sq ft)
- Lifts/elevators: 43

Design and construction
- Architect: RSP Architects Planners & Engineers
- Architecture firm: List: OMA; RSP Architects Planners & Engineers
- Developer: CapitaLand
- Structural engineer: T. Y. Lin International
- Services engineer: RSP Architects Planners & Engineers
- Awards: World Building of the Year (2015); Urban Habitat Award

Other information
- Number of rooms: 1040
- Parking: 1183

The Interlace is a 1,040-unit apartment building complex located at the boundary between Bukit Merah and Queenstown, Singapore. Noteworthy for its break from the typical tower design in cities with high population densities, it resembles Jenga blocks irregularly stacked upon each other. Designed by The Office for Metropolitan Architecture (OMA), it was awarded the World Building of the Year title at the 2015 World Architecture Festival.

The 170,000 m (560,000 ft) Interlace complex sits on 8 ha (20 acres) of land, at the corner of Depot Road and Alexandra Road. It has 31 interconnected residential blocks to maximize natural light and create communal spaces with units ranging in size from 74 m^{2} (800 ft^{2}) to 590 m^{2} (6,300 ft^{2}) for the penthouses at the top of each block. Recreational facilities include swimming pools, a gym, and tennis courts.

== History ==
The Interlace's site formerly housed the 607 units Gillman Heights Condominium, which is 50 percent owned by the National University of Singapore (NUS). The property was subsequently sold to CapitaLand through a collective sale but the sale was controversial as NUS held a 16 percent stake in Ankerite, a private fund that was a subsidiary of CapitaLand.

The Interlace was designed by Ole Scheeren and the architecture firm OMA. The project architects who followed the project through to completion while resolving design and compliance issues were RSP Architects Planners & Engineers. The project was commissioned in 2007 and finished in 2013. The property has a 99-year lease from the Singapore government since 2009. The property is surrounded by several parks that are connected and promote the Singapore Green initiative of 2012.

== Architecture ==
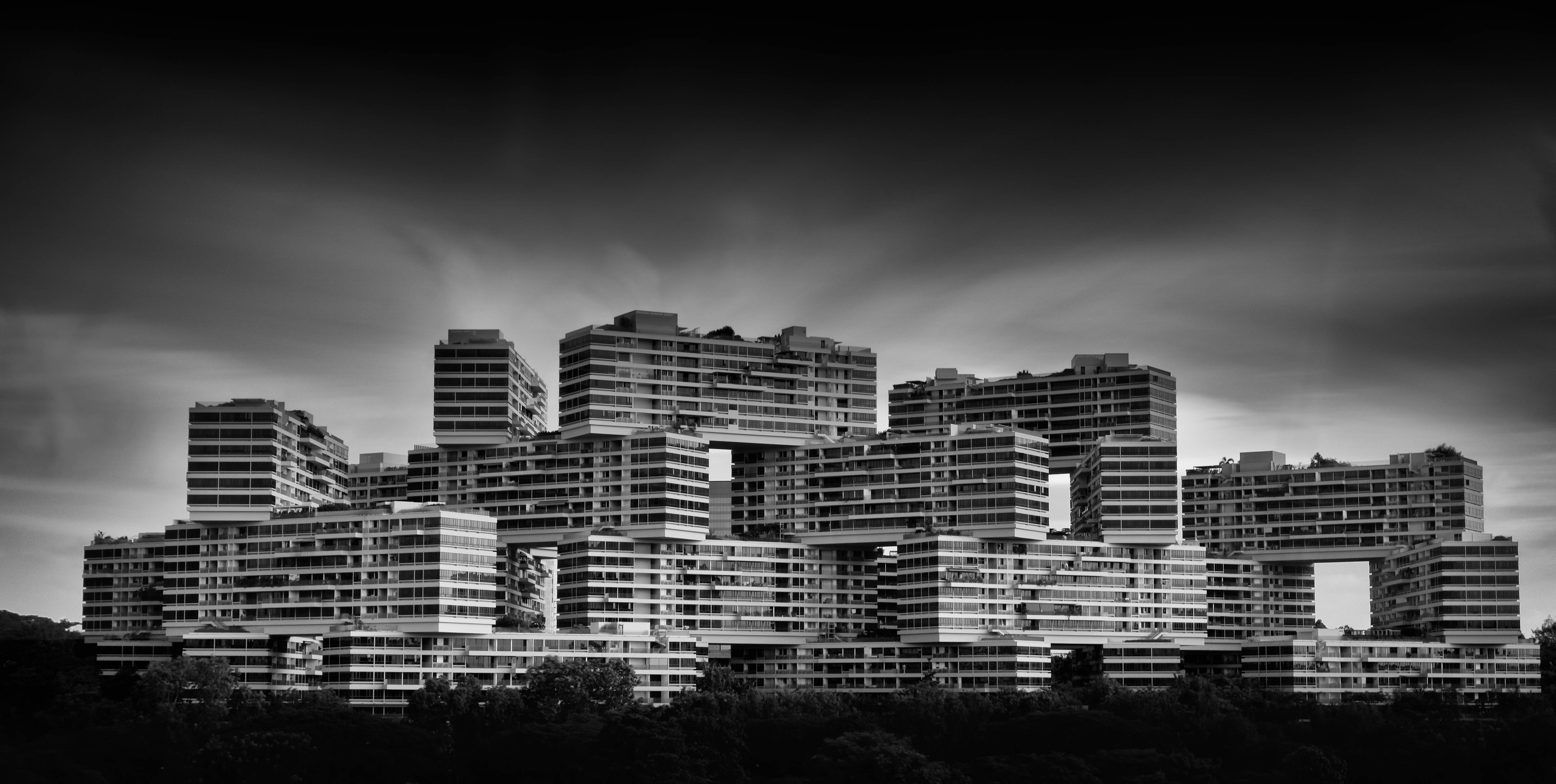
Overview of the complex

Interlace consists of six storey blocks staggered in a hexagonal arrangements surrounding eight courtyards. The blocks are stacked four high at the center to provide maximum of 24 floors. This provides almost every home with a wide view of the surrounding areas. The courtyards have swimming pools.

== Reception ==
The architecture community have praised the Interlace, with the project winning World Building of the Year 2015. It has been viewed as a challenge to traditional architecture not just in Singapore, but all over the world by CNBC. Geoffrey Montes, writing for Architectural Digest, described the building as "striking residential complex." Laura Raskin praised the design by saying "Architect Ole Scheeren hypothesized that dense urban residential living didn't have to occur in an isolating skyscraper--and he was right", although Raskin was equivocal about whether the building would ultimately deliver on its ambitions, noting "it is unclear whether the Interlace will be successful in creating the kind of communal society Scheeren envisioned." Interlace won the Urban Habitat Award in 2014.
