= KfW =

German state-owned investment and development bank

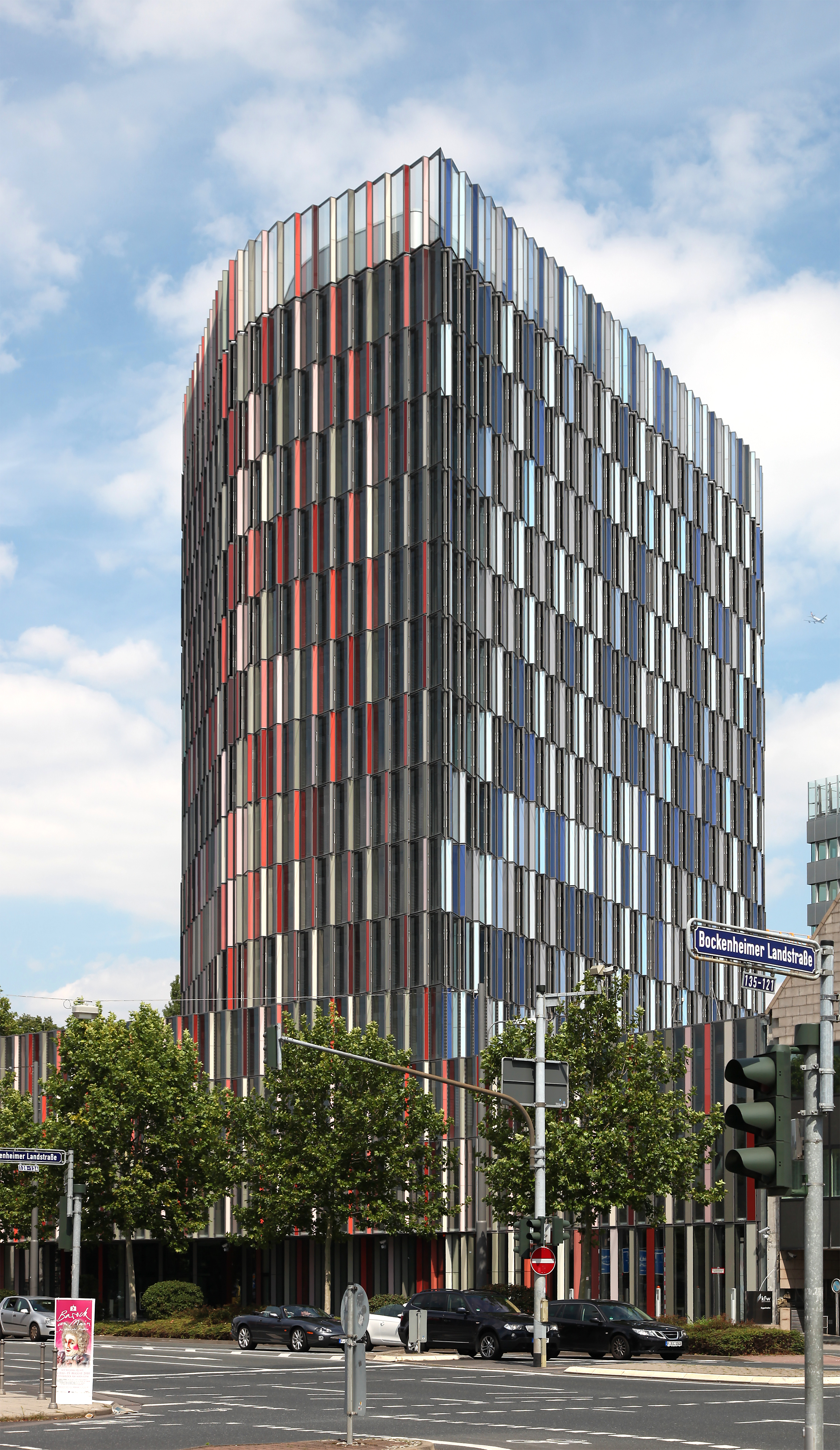
- KfW Westarkade, the headquarters of KfW in Frankfurt
- Formerly: Kreditanstalt für Wiederaufbau
- Type: Public law legal entity (Statutory corporation)
- Industry: Financial services
- Founded: November 1948; 77 years ago
- Headquarters: KfW Westarkade, Frankfurt, Germany
- Key people: Stefan Wintels (CEO); Lars Klingbeil (Chair of Supervisory Board)
- Products: Housing finance, small and medium enterprise finance, export finance, import finance, foreign investment finance, development aid
- Operating income: ▲€1.903 billion (2025)
- Net income: ▼€1.002 billion (2025)
- Total assets: ▼€540.7 billion (2025)
- Total equity: ▲€40.6 billion (2025)
- Owner: Federal Republic of Germany (80%); States of Germany (20%)
- Number of employees: 8,699 (2025)
- Website: www.kfw.de

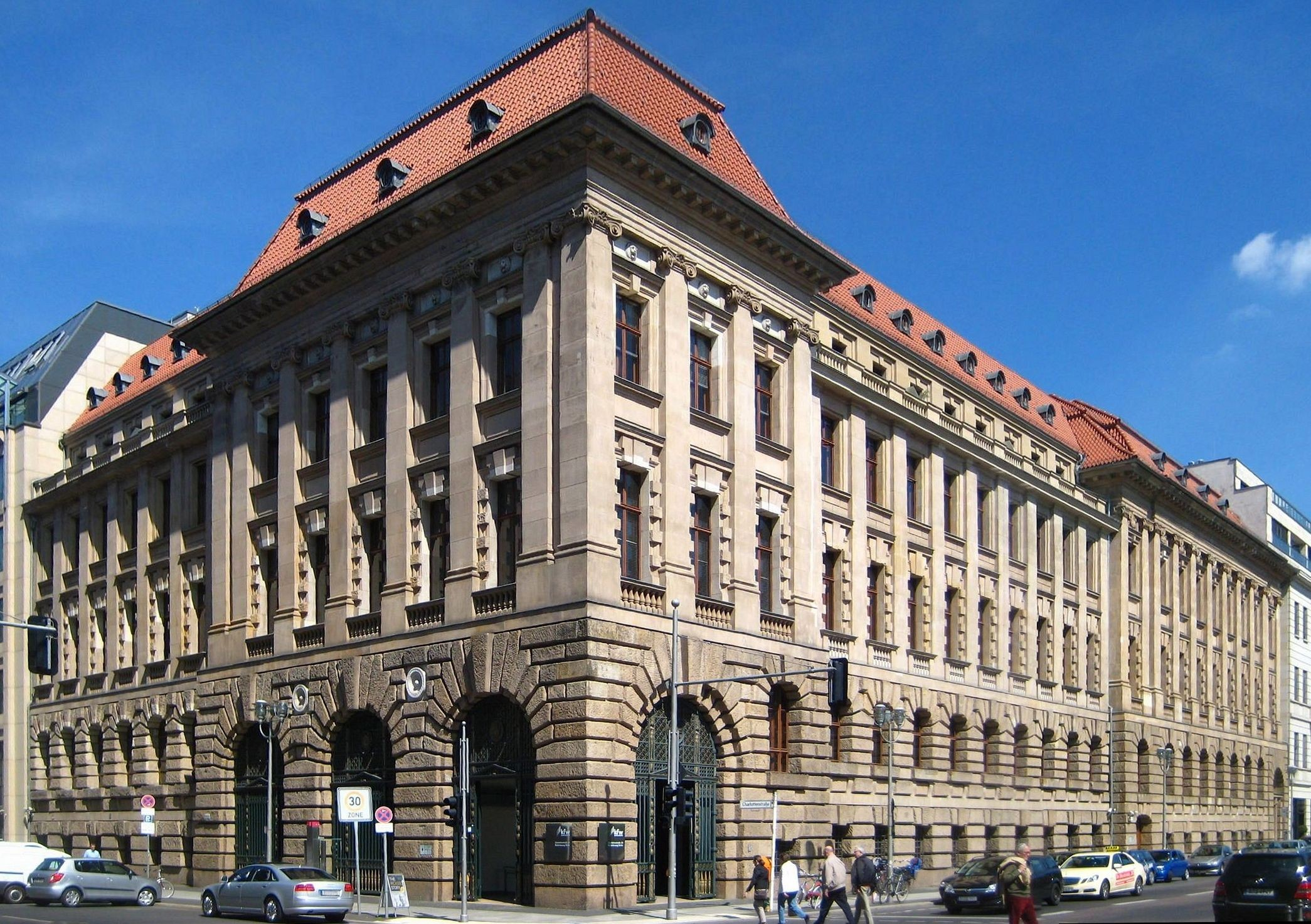
Former Berliner Handels-Gesellschaft headquarters annex on Charlottenstrasse 33 (1911), now Berlin office of KfW

The KfW, which together with its subsidiaries DEG, KfW IPEX-Bank and FuB forms the KfW Bankengruppe ("banking group"), is a German state-owned investment and development bank, based in Frankfurt. As of 2025, it is one of the world's leading development banks, ranking third globally by total assets according to the Sovereign Wealth Fund Institute. It also remains Germany's third largest bank overall. Its name originally comes from Kreditanstalt für Wiederaufbau ("Credit Institute for Reconstruction"). It was formed in 1948 after World War II as part of the Marshall Plan.

In 2024, Germany was the second-largest provider of development co-operation among the Development Assistance Committee (DAC). Germany's total official development assistance (ODA) decreased to USD 32.4 billion (preliminary data), representing 0.67% of gross national income (GNI). Bilateral co-operation, primarily led by the Federal Ministry for Economic Cooperation and Development (BMZ), constitutes the bulk of this assistance, while the Federal Foreign Office oversees humanitarian aid and crisis prevention.

== Governance ==
KfW is owned by the Federal Republic of Germany (80 percent) and the States of Germany (20 percent). It is led by a five-member executive board headed by CEO Stefan Wintels, which in turn reports to a 37 member Board of Supervisory Directors. The chair and deputy chair of the Board of Supervisory Directors are the German Federal Ministers of Finance and of Economic Affairs, with the positions alternating annually between them. Currently, the chairman is Lars Klingbeil, Federal Minister of Finance.

In 2009, Caisse des Dépots, Cassa Depositi e Prestiti, KfW and European Investment Bank founded the Long-Term Investors Club.

== Operations ==
KfW banking group covers over 90% of its borrowing needs in the capital markets, mainly through bonds that are guaranteed by the federal government. This allows KfW to raise funds at advantageous conditions. Its exemption from having to pay corporate taxes due to its legal status as a public agency and unremunerated equity provided by its public shareholders allow KfW to provide loans for purposes prescribed by the KfW law at lower rates than commercial banks. KfW is not allowed to compete with commercial banks, but it facilitates their business in areas within its mandate. KfW banking group has three business units with distinct functions, as well as several subsidiaries.

Lending by KfW group's two main business units, accounting for more than 90% of total lending, is in Germany and, to a limited extent, in other European countries. However, its largest subsidiary, KfW IPEX-Bank GmbH, predominantly lends internationally. A smaller subsidiary, the German Investment Corporation (DEG), and one of the group's smaller business units, KfW Development Bank, are exclusively active in the international arena, each within their particular business areas.

== Subsidiaries and group units ==
=== Housing and environment ===
KfW Förderbank (KfW promotional bank), the group's largest business unit, committed €47.6 billion in 2014, mostly for housing and environmental protection in Germany. By 2024, the unit had shifted its focus toward mobilising private capital for the "green transformation," with a business volume of €111.3 billion.

In the housing sector, it actively promotes energy-efficient construction and affordable housing, having evolved its earlier standards (KfW-40/60) into the current "Federal Funding for Efficient Buildings" (BEG) framework. Regarding environmental protection, its mandate has expanded from early renewable energy incentives to large-scale decarbonisation and offshore wind projects.

Since 2006, KfW has also been engaged in education by providing student loans to finance living expenses during undergraduate, postgraduate, and doctoral studies. The loan is independent of the student's or their parents' income and offers monthly disbursements of up to €650 for students at state-recognized universities in Germany.

=== Small and medium enterprises ===
KfW Mittelstandsbank (KfW small and medium enterprises bank), the group's second-largest business unit, provides financial assistance to German small and medium enterprises (SMEs), including individual entrepreneurs and start-ups. In addition to standard loans, it offers equity and mezzanine financing to strengthen the capital base of young companies. By 2024, its annual financing volume reached €29.5 billion. The unit's strategy increasingly focuses on digital innovation and the "green transformation" of the German Mittelstand, supported by a group-wide balance sheet total that stood at €545.4 billion at the end of 2024.

KfW has been very active in securitization before this market collapsed during the subprime mortgage crisis. Through securitization it helped commercial banks to transfer risks from their housing and SME portfolios to the capital market. KfW also provides loans to European commercial banks to help them finance SMEs, housing and infrastructure (so-called global loans).

=== Development aid ===
KfW Entwicklungsbank (KfW Development Bank) provides financing to governments, public enterprises and commercial banks engaged in microfinance and SME promotion in developing countries. It does so through loans close to market terms using its own resources ("promotional loans"), soft loans that blend KfW resources with support from the federal government's aid budget ("development loans"), as well as highly subsidized loans and grants, the latter two coming entirely from the federal aid budget. Different country groups are offered different financing conditions depending mainly on their per capita income. All these financing instruments are part of what is officially called development cooperation and is often also called "development aid".

In German aid, the work of KfW Development Bank is called "financial cooperation" which is complemented by "technical cooperation" by GIZ and other public agencies. The main sectors of financial cooperation are water supply and sanitation, renewable energy and energy efficiency, as well as the development of the financial sector. KfW Development Bank also works, among other sectors, in health, education, agriculture, forestry, solid waste management. It provided €7.4 billion in loans and grants in 2014.

=== Export and project finance ===
The largest subsidiary of KfW banking group is KfW IPEX-Bank. KfW IPEX-Bank is active in project finance and corporate finance related to German or European exports. It also promotes foreign investments in Germany. Unlike KfW, it competes directly with commercial banks. Therefore, and in response to concerns voiced by the European Commission concerning unfair competition, KfW IPEX-Bank has become legally and financially independent in 2008. KfW IPEX-Bank's main sectors of activity are ports, airports, toll roads, bridges and tunnels, railways, ships, planes, telecommunications, energy, and manufacturing. In 2014 the balance sheet total of KfW IPEX-Bank amounted to €26.3 billion.

Another subsidiary of KfW banking group, the German Investment Corporation (DEG), takes minority equity stakes and provides loans to private companies investing in developing countries. It pursues a business model broadly similar to that of the International Finance Corporation of the World Bank Group. Its main sectors of activity are banking, agro-business, renewable energy, telecommunications and manufacturing. It lent 1.2 billion in 2008.

=== State shareholding ===
On behalf of the German state, KfW holds shares in a variety of corporations, including Deutsche Post, Deutsche Telekom, Commerzbank, and CureVac.

=== Advisory services ===
In 2013, KfW agreed to help establish a Portuguese financial institution to foster economic growth and boost job creation in the country.

== Awards ==
The magazine Global Finance rated KfW as the safest bank in the world in its "World's 50 Safest Banks 2014" rating. The rating was based on long-term foreign currency ratings from Fitch Ratings and Standard and Poor's and the long-term bank deposit ratings from Moody's Investors Service.

== Controversy ==
In September 2008, as investors were scrambling to get their funds out of Lehman Brothers, KfW accidentally wired €320 million to the collapsing investment bank; Germany's largest circulation newspaper, Bild, called KfW "Germany's Dumbest Bank" at the time. The bank subsequently fired two board members over the transfer.

Due to a technical glitch, KfW again accidentally transferred 7.6 billion euros to four other banks in February 2017 but recovered the funds, incurring costs of 25,000 euros.

== See also ==
- Reconstruction Finance Corporation (United States)
- List of development aid agencies
- List of national development banks
- List of banks in Germany
