= Cities on the Move =

Cities on the Move was a major traveling exhibition curated by Hou Hanru and Hans Ulrich Obrist . The exhibition toured to various locations from 1997 to 1999, presenting the cultural impact of East Asia's rapid urban development in the late twentieth century through a mix of visual art, architecture, and film.

The exhibition opened in 1997 at the Vienna Secession in Austria, and then traveled in various forms to MoMA PS1, New York; CAPC Musée d’art contemporain de Bordeaux; the Louisiana Museum of Modern Art, Denmark; Hayward Gallery, London; Bangkok; and Kiasma, Helsinki. Overall, it involved more than 150 architects, artists, filmmakers, and designers. According to Asia Art Archive, Cities on the Move was “a landmark event in contemporary exhibition-making for its extensive use of urbanism theories, its strong involvement of architects, and its attempt to recreate an ever-evolving city within an exhibition space”, which included a continuous programme of performances, screenings, and discussions during the exhibition period.

== Background ==
The exhibition's origins can be traced to 1990, when curators Hou Hanru and Hans Ulrich Obrist both moved to Paris, and Hou introduced Obrist to Chinese and Hong Kong art for the first time. Conceived during a period of rapid urban and economic growth in East Asia, the exhibition's first iteration opened just a few months after the beginning of the 1997 Asian financial crisis, which saw the economic collapse of multiple countries in the region.

== Exhibition Concept, History and Venues ==
Cities on the Move presented “the dynamic and highly creative situation of contemporary urban visual culture in East Asia” in the context of the unprecedented growth of cities in the region. The exhibition curators Hou Hanru and Hans Ulbrecht Obrist chose cities as a site to explore themes of modernisation such as consumerism, monumental architecture, traffic congestion, privacy and public space, and competitive urbanism.

Over two years and across seven locations, the exhibition's curators and artists experimented with different strategies to respond to the unfolding sociocultural, economic, and political crises in Asia. In each setting, the project took on various forms through new commissions, artists, groupings and themes.

=== Secession Vienna ===
Cities on the Move was first installed on the eve of the hundredth anniversary of the Vienna Secession. It took place from 26 November 1997 to 18 January 1998.

=== CAPC Musée d’art contemporain de Bordeaux ===
The exhibition was staged at CAPC Musée d’art contemporain de Bordeaux in France from 5 June to 30 August 1998.

=== MoMA PS1, New York ===
The exhibition took place at MoMA PS1 in New York from 18 October 1998 to 10 January 1999.

=== The Louisiana Museum of Modern Art, Humlebæk, Denmark ===
The exhibition was staged at Louisiana Museum of Modern Art in Humlebæk, Denmark, from 29 January to 21 April 1999.

=== Hayward Gallery, London ===
The exhibition took place at the Hayward Gallery, London, from 13 May to 27 June 1999.

=== Bangkok ===
The Bangkok edition of Cities on the Move took place between 9 and 30 October 1999. The exhibition was a collective endeavour by the Siam Society with the support and artistic contributions of the Asia Europe Foundation, in collaboration with European Union member states and the European Commission.

Based on the exhibition concept of Hou and Obrist, the Bangkok exhibition was co-ordinated by Ole Scheeren, Thomas Nordanstad and Albert Paraviwongchirachai, exhibition director of the Siam Society. More than 100 artists and architects from China, Indonesia, Japan, Korea, Malaysia, Philippines, Singapore, Thailand, and Europe took part.

Since the city had "no museum for contemporary art that could host a show like Cities on the Move", the organisers chose the city itself as the exhibition space, turning the life, people, and infrastructure of the city into the content of the exhibition.

=== Kiasma, Helsinki ===
The exhibition was staged at the Kiasma Museum of Contemporary Art, Helsinki, from 5 November to 19 December 1999.

== Participating Artists ==
- Aaron TAN
- Andar MANIK
- Arahmaiani
- Arata ISOZAKI, 磯崎新
- CAI Guoqiang, 蔡國強
- CHAN Michael, 陳詩華
- Chandraguptha THENUWARA
- Charles CORREA
- CHEN Shaoxiong, 陳劭雄
- CHEN Zhen, 陳箴
- CHI Tinan, 季鐵男
- Chitti KASEMKITVATANA
- CHOI Jeonghwa, 최정화
- CHOI Wook, 최욱
- Duang Prateep Foundation
- Ellen PAU
- Eric KHOO
- Fiona TAN
- Fumihiko MAKI
- Gary CHANG, 張智強
- GENG Jianyi, 耿建翌
- Hanayo, 花代
- Heri Dono
- HO Hingkay Oscar, 何慶基
- HO Siukee, 何兆基
- HO Tao, 何弢
- HUANG Chinho, 黃進河
- HUANG Yong Ping, 黃永砅
- Itsuko HASEGAWA, 長谷川逸子
- Judy Freya SIBAYAN
- Karl-Heinz Klopf
- Katsuhiro MIYAMOTO
- Kazuyo SEJIMA, 妹島和世
- Ken LUM, 林蔭庭
- Ken YEANG
- Khengsoon TAY
- KIM Jinai, 김진애
- Kimsooja, 김수자
- Kisho KUROKAWA
- Kiyonori KIKUTAKE
- KNTA
- KOO Jeonga, 구정아
- Lee Bul
- LIANG Juhui, 梁鉅輝
- LIEW Kungyu
- LIN Yilin, 林一林
- Mariko MORI, 森万里子
- Marintan SIRAIT
- Matthew Mingfook NGUI
- MINN Sohnjoo, 민손주
- Miwa YANAGI, やなぎみわ
- Navin RAWANCHAIKUL
- Nobuyoshi ARAKI, 荒木経惟
- Osamu ISHIYAMA, 石山修武
- Richard HO
- Riken YAMAMOTO
- Rirkrit Tiravanija
- Ryuji MIYAMOTO, 宮本隆司
- Sarah SZE
- SEUNG Hyosang, 승효상
- SHEN Yuan, 沈遠
- SHI Yong, 施勇
- Simryn Gill
- Sumet Jumsai
- Surasi KUSOLWONG
- Takahiro TANAKA, 田中隆博
- Takashi HOMMA, ホンマタカシ
- Takashi Murakami
- Toyking TING
- Toyo ITO, 伊藤豐雄
- TSANG Tsouchoi / King of Kowloon, 九龍皇帝, 曾灶財
- Tsuyoshi OZAWA, 小沢剛
- WANG Du, 王度
- WANG Jianwei, 汪建偉
- WANG Junjieh, 王俊傑
- Wong & Ouyang Associates
- WONG Hoycheong, 黃海昌
- XU Tan, 徐坦
- YIN Xiuzhen, 尹秀珍
- Yutaka SONE, 曾根裕
- ZHAN Wang, 展望
- ZHANG Peili, 張培力
- ZHANG Yonghe, 張永和
- ZHENG Guogu, 鄭國谷
- ZHOU Tiehai, 周鐵海
- ZHU Jia, 朱 加
