= KfW Westarkade =

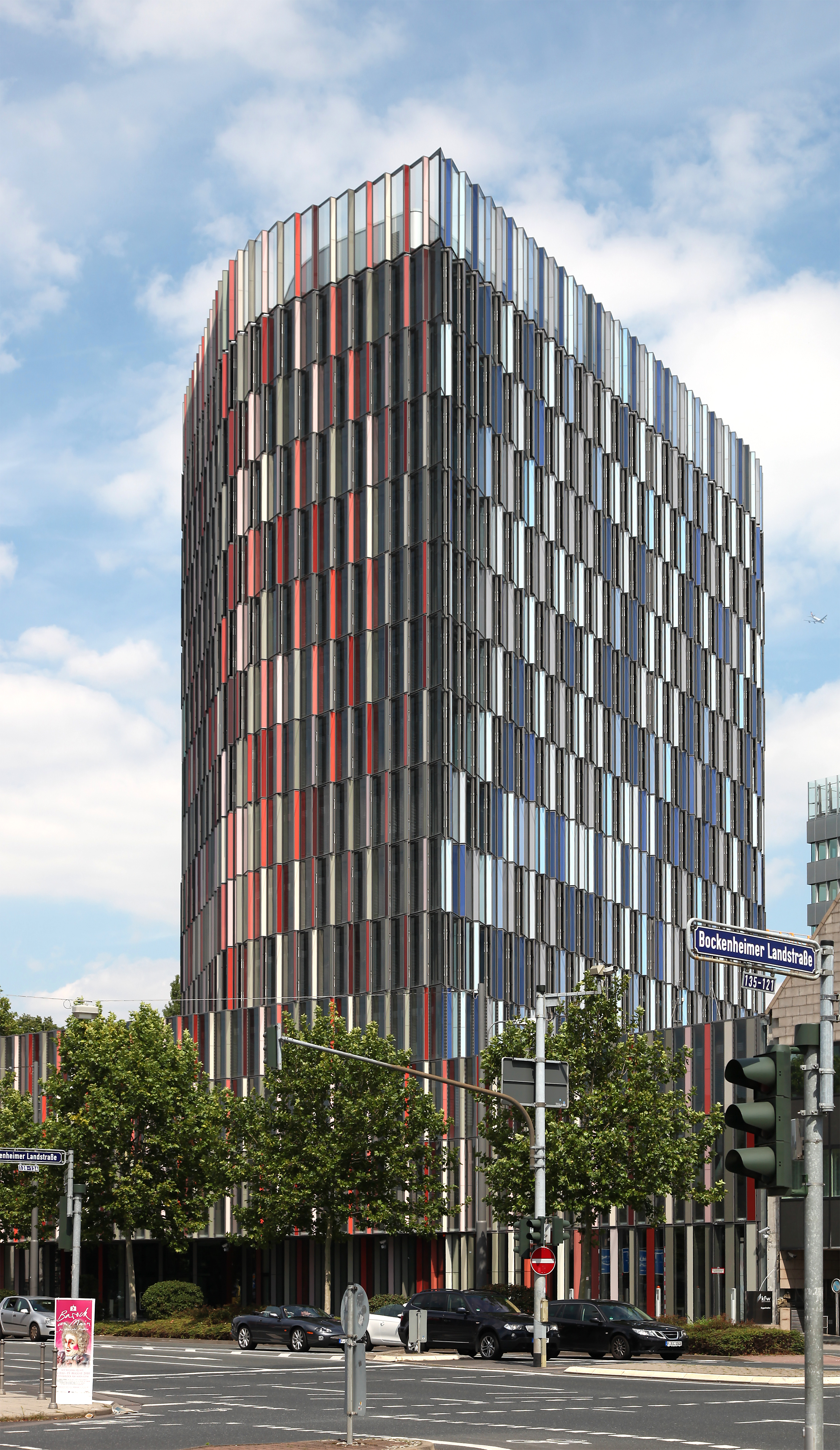
- The Westarkade in 2010
- Interactive map of the KfW Westarkade area

General information
- Status: Completed
- Type: Office building
- Location: Zeppelinallee 6, Frankfurt, Germany
- Coordinates: 50°07′15.22″N 8°39′15.99″E
- Construction started: 2007
- Completed: 2010
- Owner: KfW Bankengruppe

Height
- Tip: 60.1 m (197 ft)
- Roof: 56 m (184 ft)
- Top floor: 47.7 m (156 ft)

Technical details
- Floor count: 14
- Floor area: 39,000 m^{2} (420,000 sq ft)
- Lifts/elevators: 8

Design and construction
- Architects: Sauerbruch Hutton & Architekten Theiss Planungsgesellschaft mbH
- Structural engineer: Werner Sobek Group GmbH
- Main contractor: Züblin

Other information
- Public transit access: Bockenheimer Warte; 16 Bockenheimer Warte; 32, 36, 50, N1 Bockenheimer Warte

References
- CTBUH ArchDaily

KfW Westarkade is a 60.1-meter (197 ft) office building located in Frankfurt, Germany. The 14-storey building completed in 2010, is located in the Westend district in Frankfurt and serves as the headquarters for KfW, the German state-owned development bank. The KfW Westarkade is an example of sustainable architecture, which was led by three key factors, natural ventilation, activated slabs and geothermal energy, and the building is one of the first office towers in the world predicted to run on less than 90KWh/m^{2} of primary energy per year. The KfW Westarkade was named the Council on Tall Buildings and Urban Habitat 2011 Best Tall Building Overall.

== Background ==
The KfW Westarkade began construction in 2007 following the demolition of the library which had previously sat at the space. The Westarkade contains conference facilities and office space for 700 people, and served to expand the KfW campus in the area, which includes buildings constructed from the 1970s through to 1990s.

== See also ==
- List of tallest buildings in Frankfurt
- List of tallest buildings in Germany
- List of tallest buildings in Europe
