= DUO =

Mixed-use development in Singapore

General information
- Status: Completed
- Type: Residential, offices, retail, hotel
- Location: Bugis, Singapore
- Coordinates: 1.2995°N 103.8583°E

Height
- Roof: Residences Tower: 192.8m AMSL; DUO Tower: 185.35m AMSL

Technical details
- Floor count: Residences Tower: 49; DUO Tower: 39

Design and construction
- Architects: Buro Ole Scheeren (Lead design architect); DP Architects (Executive architect)
- Developer: M+S; UEM Sunrise Berhad (Project Manager); CapitaLand Limited (Project Manager)

Website
- www.marinaone.com.sg

DUO is a contemporary twin-tower integrated mixed-use development in Singapore, comprising residential accommodation, offices, a hotel and a retail gallery.

Duo, together with Marina One at the Marina Bay area - both mixed-use developments - were developed at the same time by M+S, a joint venture between the sovereign wealths of Singapore and Malaysia - Temasek Holdings and Khazanah Nasional. It was designed by Ole Scheeren.

There are two main towers – one comprise offices and a luxury boutique hotel Andaz (part of Hyatt group), while the other tower comprise 660 residential units. The complex was opened on 15 January 2018. On 8 October 2019, one of the towers which include the Andaz Hotel component of the development was sold for $475 million to Hoi Hup Realty.

== Site plans ==
DUO is bordered by Ophir Road, Rochor Road and Beach Road. The complex is directly connected to the Bugis MRT station served by the East–West Line and Downtown Line.

== Awards ==
DUO won the Silver award in the “Best Futura Project” category at MIPIM Asia Awards 2012.

DUO received the Council of Tall Buildings’ Urban Habitat Award 2021.

== Gallery ==
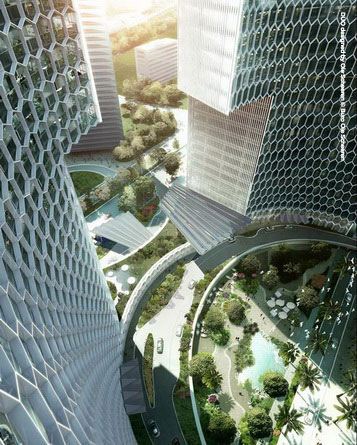
Artist's impression of DUO's driveway and landscaped plaza
