= Lynn S. Beedle =

American structural engineer

- Born: Lynn Simpson Beedle; December 7, 1917; Orland, California, U.S.
- Died: October 30, 2003 (aged 85); Hellertown, Pennsylvania, U.S.
- Education: University of California, Berkeley (BS, 1941); Lehigh University (MS, PhD 1952)
- Known for: Council on Tall Buildings and Urban Habitat (Founder); Plastic design of steel frames Structural stability research
- Military career
- Branch: United States Navy
- Rank: Lieutenant Commander
- Unit: Norfolk Naval Shipyard
- Conflicts: World War II (Bikini Atoll nuclear tests)

Dr. Lynn S. Beedle (December 7, 1917 – October 30, 2003) was an American structural engineer, the founder and the director of the Council on Tall Buildings and Urban Habitat, and known for his design and building of skyscrapers. The New York Times has called him "an expert on tall buildings".

Beedle is also credited with making Lehigh University in Bethlehem, Pennsylvania a center of research for civil and structural engineering because of his "groundbreaking studies on the properties of steel structures".

== Early life and education ==
Beedle was born in Orland, California. In 1941, he graduated from the University of California, Berkeley, with a B.S. degree in civil engineering, and joined the US Navy where he commanded underwater explosion research at the Norfolk Naval Shipyard in Virginia and served as Deputy Officer in Charge of the Nuclear testing at Bikini Atoll in 1946. Following the war, Beedle joined the faculty at Lehigh University as a research instructor. While teaching, he completed his graduate education, earning an M.S. in 1949 and a Ph.D. in 1952.

== Awards ==
Beedle was elected to the National Academy of Engineering in 1972 "for contributions to steel structures research and design practice, especially plastic design and residual stress effects." The Council on Tall Buildings and Urban Habitat honored Beedle with creation of the Lynn S. Beedle Achievement Award. Beedle was a recipient of a lifetime achievement award from the American Society of Civil Engineers. He received Franklin Institute’s Frank P. Brown Medal, and the John Fritz Medal, the Berkeley Engineering Alumni Society Distinguished Engineering Alumnus Award, and was named Distinguished Professor of Civil Engineering by Lehigh University.
