= China Now =

"CHINA NOW" was the largest festival of Chinese culture ever in the UK. It launched in February 2008, with a series of high-profile events to mark the beginning of the Chinese New Year.

== About the festival ==
Throughout the first half of 2008, until the opening ceremony of the Beijing Olympics, China Now coordinated over 1300 events, performances and activities. It showcased of art, design, cuisine and culture, science, business and technology, education and sport – an inspirational celebration of vibrant, dynamic 21st-century China.

As a non-profit organisation, China Now aimed to build partnerships between artists, cultural leaders, schools, businesses and communities across the UK and China. Through an array of participatory events and activities, China Now offered insight into China’s heritage and brought the diversity of modern Chinese culture to life. The organizers hope that new connections and relationships developed over the course of the festival will cement partnerships between China and the UK that will last long into the future.

China Now was conceived by the business community and was chaired by Stephen Green, Group Chairman of HSBC Holdings plc. It was supported by the Premier of the People’s Republic of China, Wen Jiabao, the Ambassador of the People’s Republic of China to the United Kingdom, Madame Fu Ying, and the British Prime Minister, Gordon Brown, as well as that of all its founding partners and sponsors.

‘Between the Chinese New Year celebrations next February and the opening ceremony of the Beijing Olympics, the UK will be bringing together a festival of celebrations showcasing the very best of modern China.’ said Stephen Green, Group Chairman, HSBC Holdings plc in 2007.

Madame Fu Ying, Ambassador of the People’s Republic of China to the United Kingdom believes that ‘China Now has a very positive purpose as it seeks to advance the UK public’s understanding of contemporary China.’

== Events of the festival (incl. other China-related events in London in 2008) ==
- Opening by Ken Livingstone, Mayor of London
- China-UK Women's Cultural Festival, incl. display of photographs
- The First Emperor, exhibition at the British Museum
- Chinese New Year events at the British Museum (9 Feb 2008) - incl "Monkey Suite" by Damon Albarn and Jamie Hewlett
- China Design Now, exhibition at the V&A
- Icons of Revolution, Mao badges then and now, exhibition at the British Museum
- Manhua! China Comics Now, exhibition.
- Poems by Bei Dao and Yang Lian displayed on the London underground
- Olympic torch relay in London (6 April 2008)
- China Media Festival, at SOAS (18-19 June 2008)
- China in London: Spotlight on Beijing - season of contemporary Chinese cinema and a special focus on the work of film-maker Tian Zhuangzhuang, at the ICA
