= CCTV Headquarters =

Skyscraper in the central business district of Beijing, China

- 中央广播电视总台光华路办公区
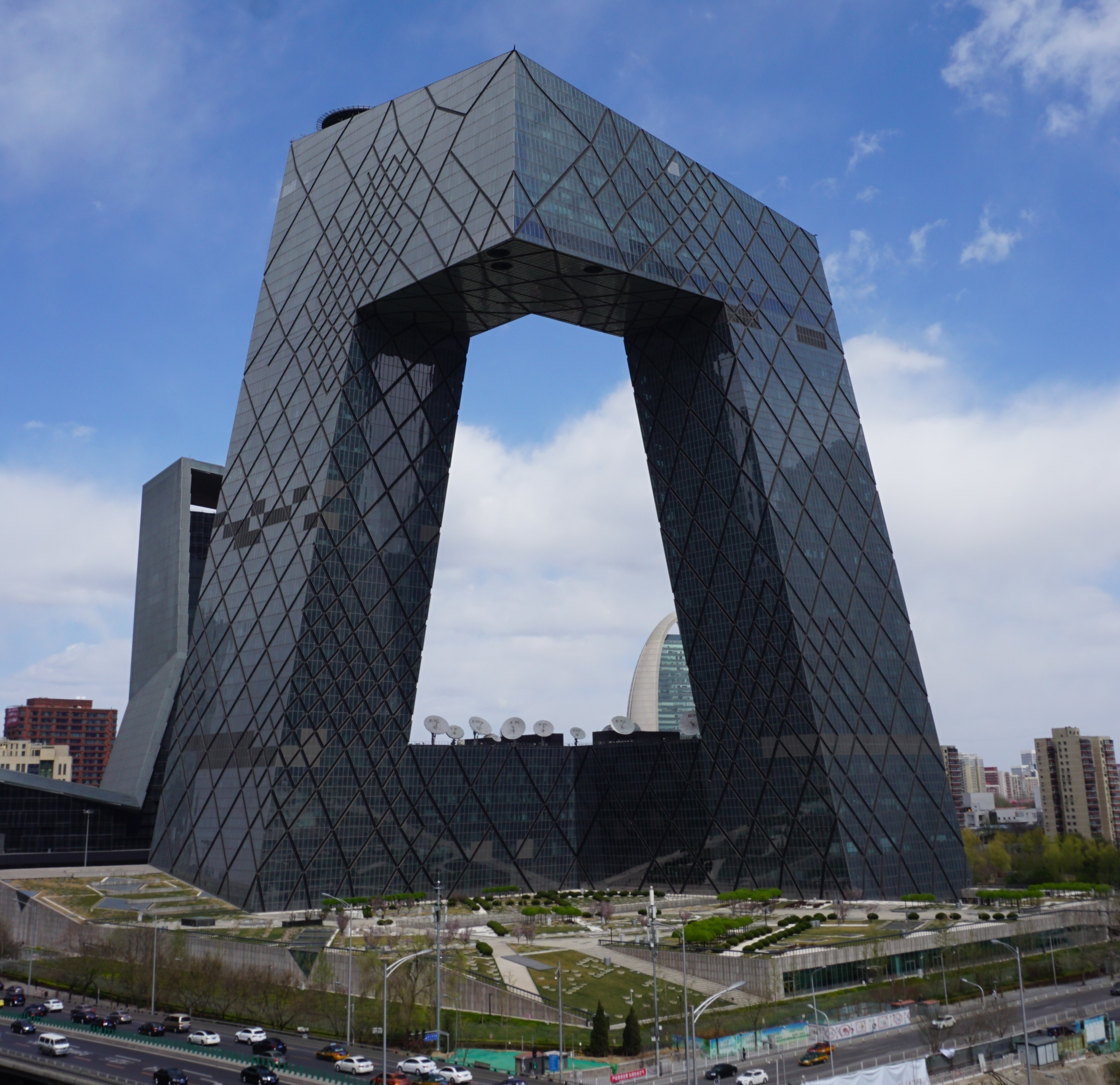
- CCTV Headquarters in 2019
- Interactive map of the CCTV Headquarters area
- Alternative names: China Central Television Headquarters; China Media Group (CMG) Office Block at Guanghua Road; Central Chinese Television Tower

General information
- Location: East Third Ring Road; Guanghua Road; Beijing, China
- Coordinates: 39.91347°N 116.45805°E
- Construction started: 1 June 2004
- Completed: 16 May 2012
- Owner: China Media Group
- Operator: China Media Group

Height
- Roof: 234 m (768 ft)

Technical details
- Floor count: 51; 3 below ground
- Floor area: 389,079 m^{2} (4,188,010 sq ft)
- Lifts/elevators: 75

Design and construction
- Architects: Office for Metropolitan Architecture; East China Architectural Design & Research Institute
- Developer: China Media Group
- Structural engineer: Ove Arup & Partners
- Main contractor: China State Construction and Engineering Corporation

CCTV Headquarters
- Simplified Chinese: 中央广播电视总台光华路办公区
- Traditional Chinese: 中央廣播電視總台光華路辦公區
- Literal meaning: Central Radio and Television Station Guanghua Road Office Area
Transcriptions
Standard Mandarin
- Hanyu Pinyin: Zhōngyāng Guǎngbō Diànshì Zǒngtái Guānghuá Lù Bàngōng Qū

The CCTV Headquarters is a 51-floor skyscraper consisting of two conjoined towers that sits on the East Third Ring Road, Guanghua Road in the Beijing Central Business District (CBD). It serves as the headquarters for China Central Television (CCTV) and is the world's 10th largest office building. Rem Koolhaas and Ole Scheeren of OMA were the architects in charge for the building, while Cecil Balmond at Arup provided the complex engineering design.

The building's construction began on 1 June 2004 and its façade was completed in January 2008. The structure was feted by some architectural critics as "the greatest work of architecture built in this century" and was named the 2013 Best Tall Building Worldwide by the Council on Tall Buildings and Urban Habitat.

== Background and critical reception ==
Architecture critics claim that "Mr. Koolhaas, of the Office for Metropolitan Architecture, has always been interested in making buildings that expose the conflicting energies at work in society, and the CCTV building is the ultimate expression of that aim," thus giving rise to "the slippery symbolism of its exterior." According to Koolhaas, the design embodies his "optimism about the intentions of the Chinese state", which he describes as better able to care for the public system than Western capitalism.

The main building is not a traditional tower, but a loop of six horizontal and vertical sections covering 473,000 m^{2} (5,090,000 sq ft) of floor space, creating an irregular grid on the building's façade with an open center. The construction of the building is considered to be a structural challenge, especially because it is in a seismic zone. Rem Koolhaas has said the building "could never have been conceived by the Chinese and could never have been built by Europeans. It is a hybrid by definition". The loop of its design is intended to symbolize concepts of collectivity, communication, continuity, and integration. Because of its radical shape, it is said that a taxi driver first came up with its nickname dà kùchǎ (大裤衩), roughly translated as "big boxer shorts". Locals often refer to it as "big pants".

The building was built in three buildings that were joined to become one and a half buildings on 30 May 2007. In order not to lock in structural differentials, this connection was scheduled in the early morning when the steel in the two towers cooled to the same temperature. The CCTV building was part of a media park intended to form a landscape of public entertainment, outdoor filming areas, and production studios as an extension of the central green axis of the CBD.

The Office for Metropolitan Architecture won the contract from the Beijing International Tendering Co. to construct the CCTV Headquarters and the Television Cultural Center by its side on 1 January 2002, after winning an international design competition. The jury included architect Arata Isozaki and critic Charles Jencks. It is among the first of 300 new towers in the new Beijing CBD. Administration, news, broadcasting, and program production offices and studios are all contained inside.

CCTV Headquarters was officially opened by the chairman on 1 January 2008. Among the distinguished guests at the opening were Hu Jintao, Jiang Zemin, Wen Jiabao and Guo Jinlong.

CCTV Headquarters went on to be feted by architecture critics as perhaps "the greatest work of architecture built in this century", and was awarded the 2013 Best Tall Building Worldwide from the Council on Tall Buildings and Urban Habitat.

== 2009 fire ==
An adjacent building in the complex, the Television Cultural Center, caught on fire, ignited by fireworks on Lantern Festival day, 9 February 2009, before the building's scheduled completion in May 2009. It was to have the Beijing Mandarin Oriental Hotel, a visitor center, a large public theater, two recording studios with three audio control rooms, a digital cinema and two screening rooms. The 160-metre-tall (520 ft) Mandarin Oriental Hotel was badly damaged and one fire fighter was killed. The director of the project and 19 others were imprisoned. On 25 October 2009, scaffolds were set up in the front gate of CCTV which indicated the renovation of the building had begun. As of 9 February 2010, the main CCTV tower was still unoccupied.

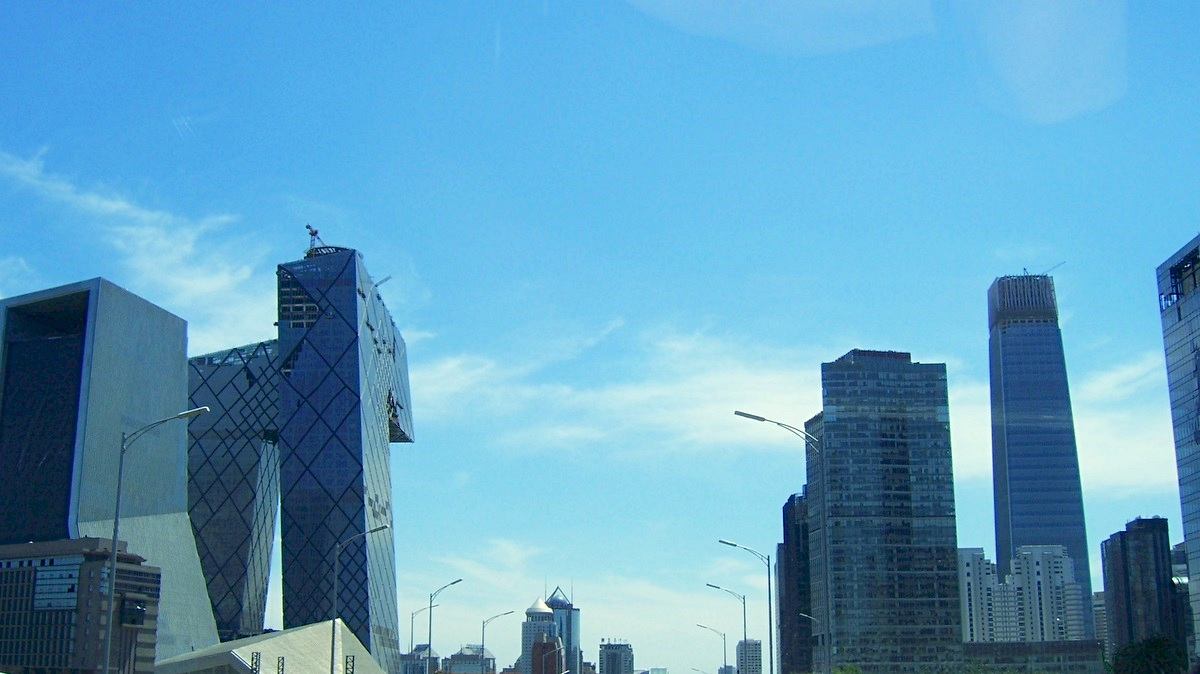
Beijing's CBD with the CCTV tower and China World Trade Center Tower 3 nearing completion (July 2008)

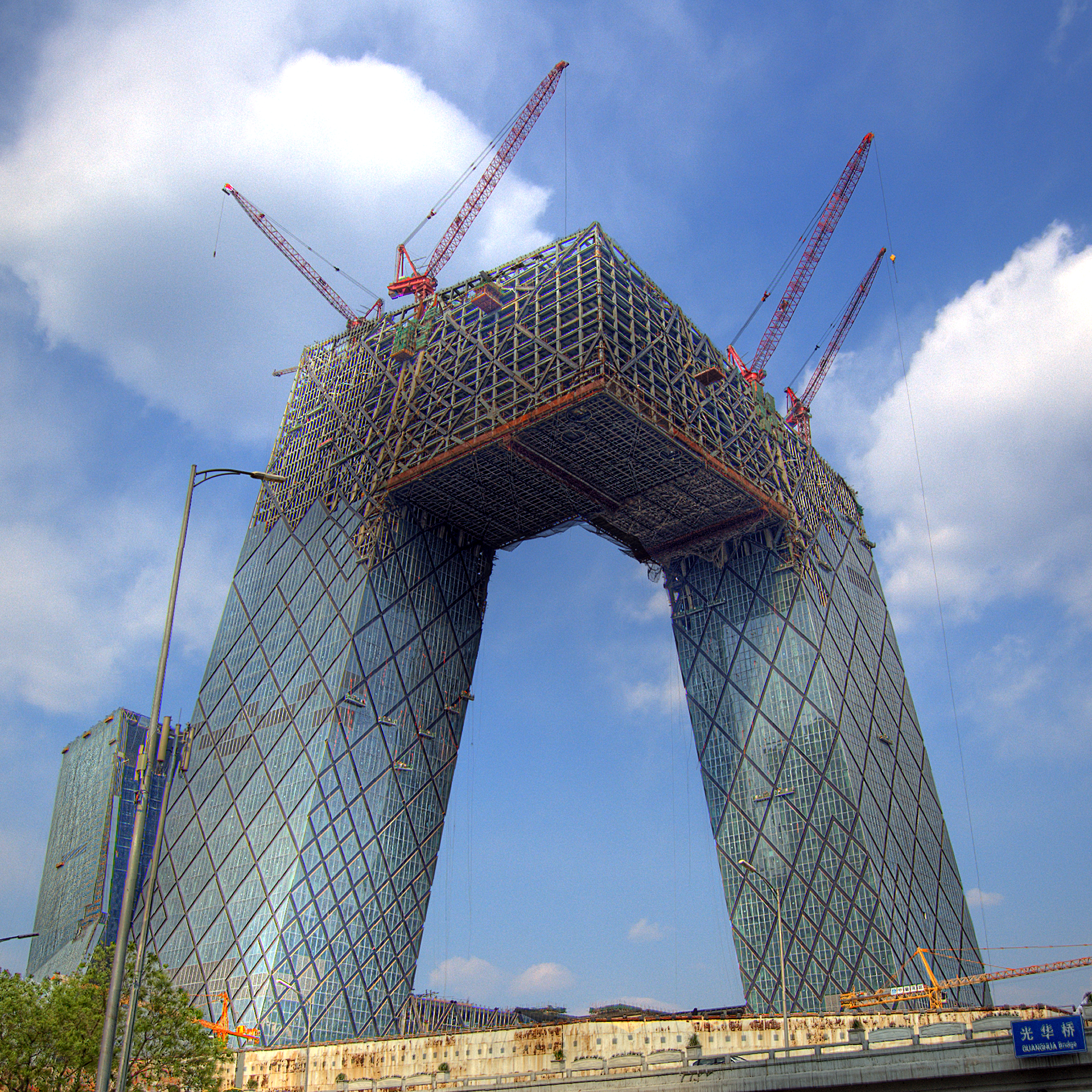
CCTV headquarters in China, Beijing district nearing completion (April 2008)

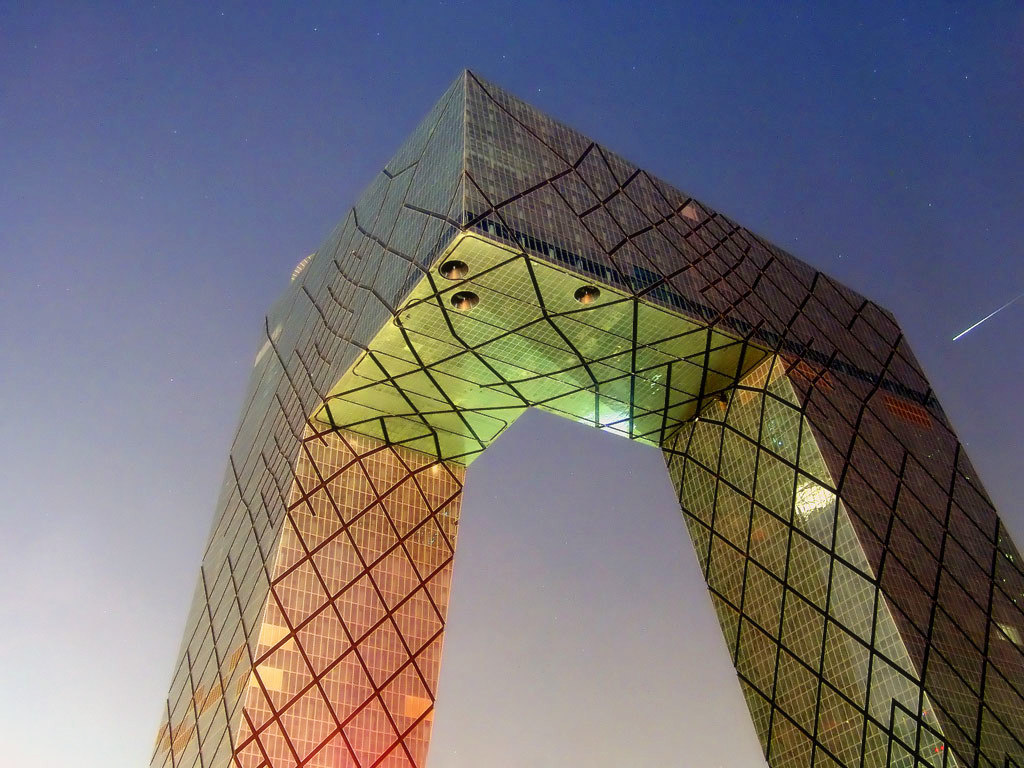
CCTV Headquarters complete (2009)

== See also ==
- Diagrid
- List of tallest buildings in Beijing

Media buildings in Beijing

- China Media Group Headquarters (former CCTV headquarters)
- Central Radio & TV Tower
- Beijing Television Cultural Center
- Beijing TV Centre
- Phoenix Center
