= Council on Vertical Urbanism =

International body

Coordinates: 41°52′50.2″N 87°37′29.9″W

- Abbreviation: CVU
- Formation: 1969; 57 years ago
- Founder: Lynn S. Beedle
- Type: Non-profit
- Purpose: Studies and reports on all aspects of tall buildings and urban design
- Headquarters: Bethlehem, Pennsylvania, U.S. (1969–2003); Chicago, Illinois, U.S. (2003–present)
- Region served: International
- Members: Over 450,000 individuals
- CTBUH Chair: Steve Watts of alinea Consulting
- Chief Executive Officer: Javier Quintana de Uña
- Website: verticalurbanism.org

The Council on Vertical Urbanism (CVU), formerly known as the Council on Tall Buildings and Urban Habitat (CTBUH), is an international body in the field of tall buildings, including skyscrapers, and sustainable urban design. A nonprofit organization based at the Monroe Building in Chicago, Illinois, United States, the CVU announces the title of "The World's Tallest Building" and is widely considered to be an authority on the official height of tall buildings. Its stated mission is to study and report "on all aspects of the planning, design, and construction of tall buildings."

The CVU was founded at Lehigh University in Bethlehem, Pennsylvania, in 1969 by Lynn S. Beedle, where its office remained until October 2003 when it relocated to the Illinois Institute of Technology in Chicago. On October 6, 2025, the Council on Tall Buildings and Urban Habitat was renamed and rebranded as the Council on Vertical Urbanism, as part of a broader mandate "to define and steward responsible density in cities worldwide."

== Ranking tall buildings ==
The CVU ranks the height of buildings using three different methods:

1. Height to architectural top: This is the main criterion under which the CVU ranks the height of buildings. Heights are measured from the level of the lowest, significant, open-air, pedestrian entrance to the top of the building, inclusive of spires but excluding items such as flagpoles and antennae.
2. Highest occupied floor: Height to the floor level of the highest floor that is occupied by residents, workers or other building users on a consistent basis.
3. Height to tip: Height to the highest point of the building, including antennae, flagpoles, and technical equipment.

A category measuring to the top of the roof was removed from the ranking criteria in November 2009. This is because flat-topped skyscrapers are not as common in the modern era, as skyscrapers with intricate spire designs and parapet features atop their roofs make it more difficult to define the roof of a building.

The CVU insist that a building should only be added to the official tallest list when it is (i) topped out structurally and architecturally, (ii) fully clad, and (iii) open for business, or at least partially open. This became the CVU official definition of a building's "completion".

The CTBUH maintains an extensive database (named The Skyscraper Center) of the tallest buildings in the world, organized by various categories. Buildings under construction are also included, although not ranked until completion. The CTBUH also produces an annual list of the 10 tallest buildings completed in that particular year.

== Events ==
The CVU also hosts annual conferences and a World Congress every three to five years. The 2012 World Congress was held in Shanghai from September 19 to 21. The next World Congress was held in Chicago between October 28 and November 2, 2019. The CVU also bestows Tall Building Awards each year, with four regional awards to the Americas, Europe, Africa and the Middle East, and Asia and Australasia. Among these four regional awards, one is given the "Best Tall Building Award Overall." There are also two lifetime achievement awards. Starting in 2010, these awards are presented at a symposium and dinner held on the Illinois Institute of Technology's campus. In 2012, the CVU added two new awards for Innovation and Performance.

== Publications ==
In addition to the monthly newsletter and daily updated global news archive, the CTBUH used to published a quarterly CTBUH Journal. The Journal includes peer-reviewed technical papers, in-depth project case studies, book reviews, interviews with prominent persons in the tall building industry, and much more. The CVU now publishes the Vertical Urbanism Magazine.

The CVU also publishes guidebooks, reference manuals, and monographs related to the tall building industry. In 2006 it published the book 101 of the World's Tallest Buildings in conjunction with author and CVU member Georges Binder, a reference to 101 of the world's tallest skyscrapers. It includes photos, plans, details on architects, engineers and stakeholders, and comprehensive technical data on each building. Since 2008 it has published a Best Tall Buildings book to accompany that year's awards.

== Awards ==
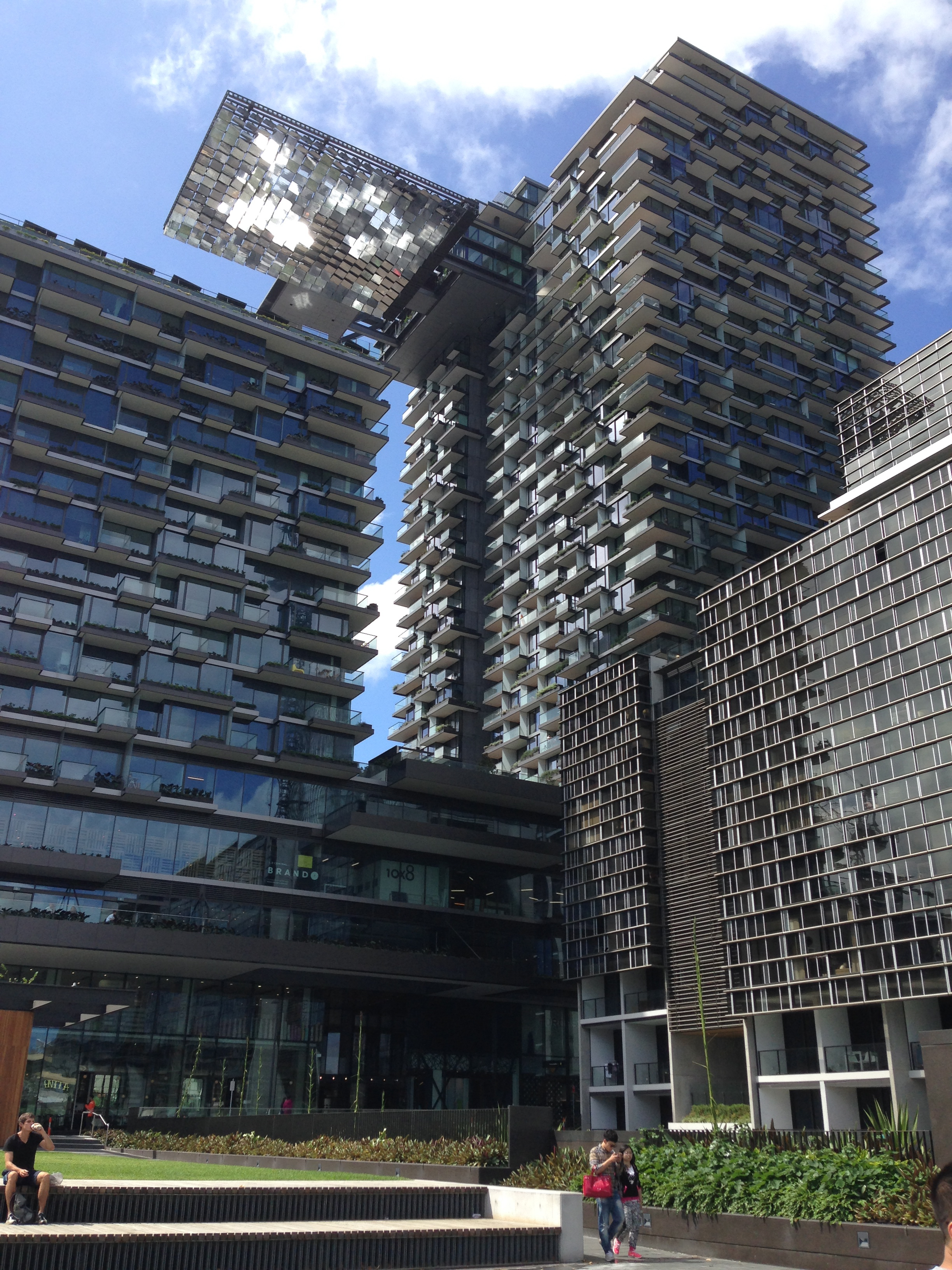
The 2014 winner of the CTBUH Skyscraper Award, One Central Park in Sydney, Australia

The CVU grants several awards every year.

=== Best Tall Building Overall Award ===
- 2007: Beetham Tower, Manchester, UK
- 2008: Opera Grand Tower, Dubai, UAE
- 2009: Linked Hybrid, Beijing, China
- 2010: Broadcasting Place, Leeds, UK
- 2010: Global Icon award, Burj Khalifa is the first recipient of this award announced on 25 October 2010, Dubai, United Arab Emirates
- 2011: KfW Westarkade, Frankfurt, Germany
- 2012: Doha Tower, Doha, Qatar
- 2013: CCTV Headquarters, Beijing, China
- 2014: One Central Park, Sydney, Australia
- 2015: Bosco Verticale, Milan, Italy
- 2016: Shanghai Tower, Shanghai, China
- 2018: Oasia Hotel Downtown, Singapore
- 2019: Salesforce Tower, San Francisco, United States
- 2021: Vancouver House, Vancouver, Canada
- 2022: David Rubenstein Forum, Chicago, United States
- 2023: Quay Quarter Tower, Sydney, Australia
- 2024: Pan Pacific Orchard, Singapore
- 2025: ZIN in No(o)rd, Brussels

Sourced from The Skyscraper Centre.

== Research ==
The CVU works with institutions of higher-education from around the world in researching projects related to tall building design.

Building as used on the CVU www.skyscrapercenter.com

== See also ==
- CTBUH Skyscraper Award
- Emporis
- Vanity height
