= Hua Lamphong (disambiguation) =

Hua Lamphong is the common colloquial name of the Bangkok railway station. The name may also refer to:

- Hua Lamphong Station, the historical terminus of the Paknam Railway
- Hua Lamphong MRT station, an underground station of the Bangkok MRT
- Hua Lamphong Road and Hua Lamphong Canal, historical names of Rama IV Road and the canal whose course it now occupies
- Wat Hua Lamphong, a Buddhist temple
