= Scala Cinema (Bangkok) =

Cinema in Bangkok, Thailand

Coordinates: 13°44′44″N 100°31′53″E

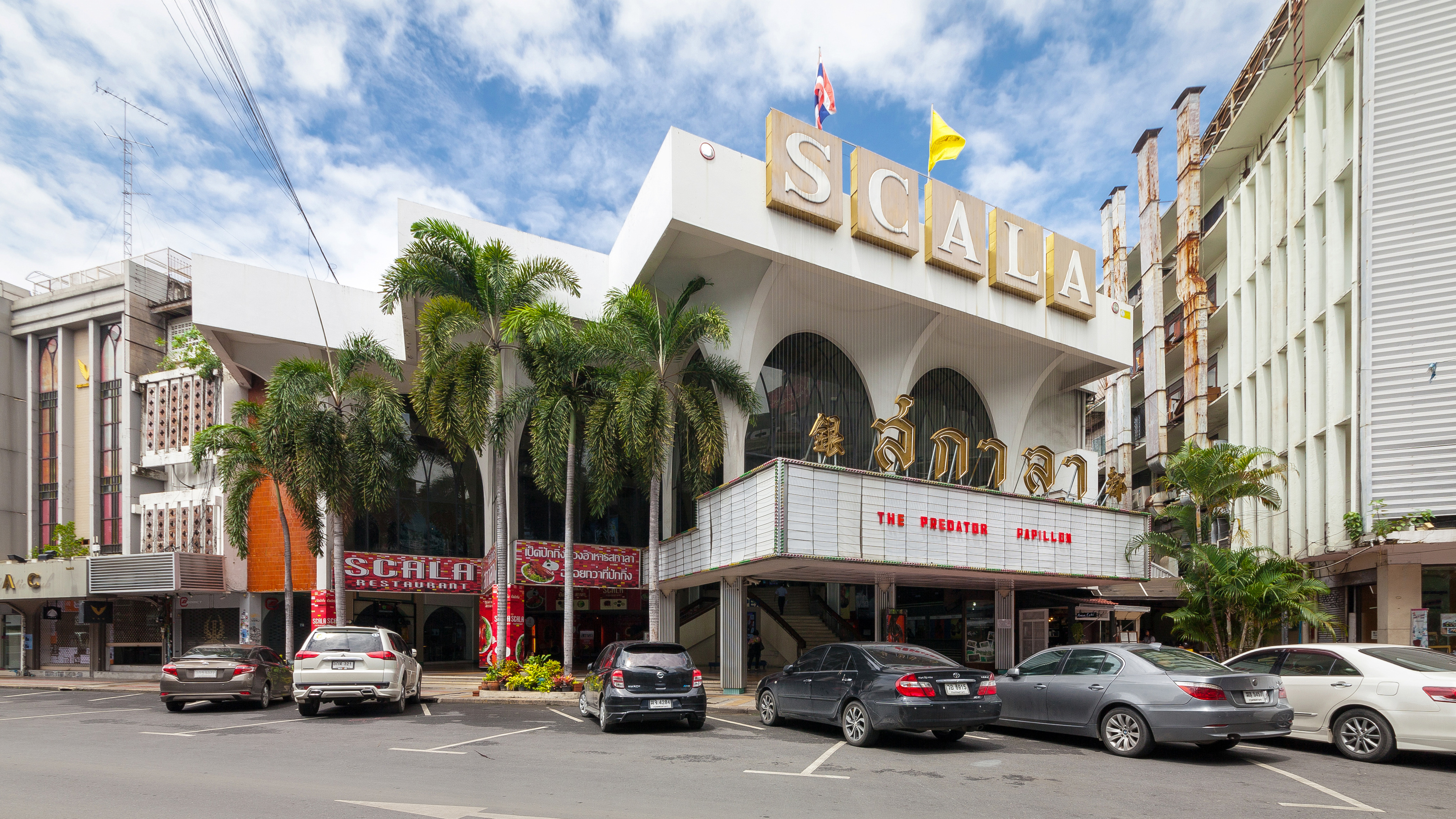
The Scala, 2018

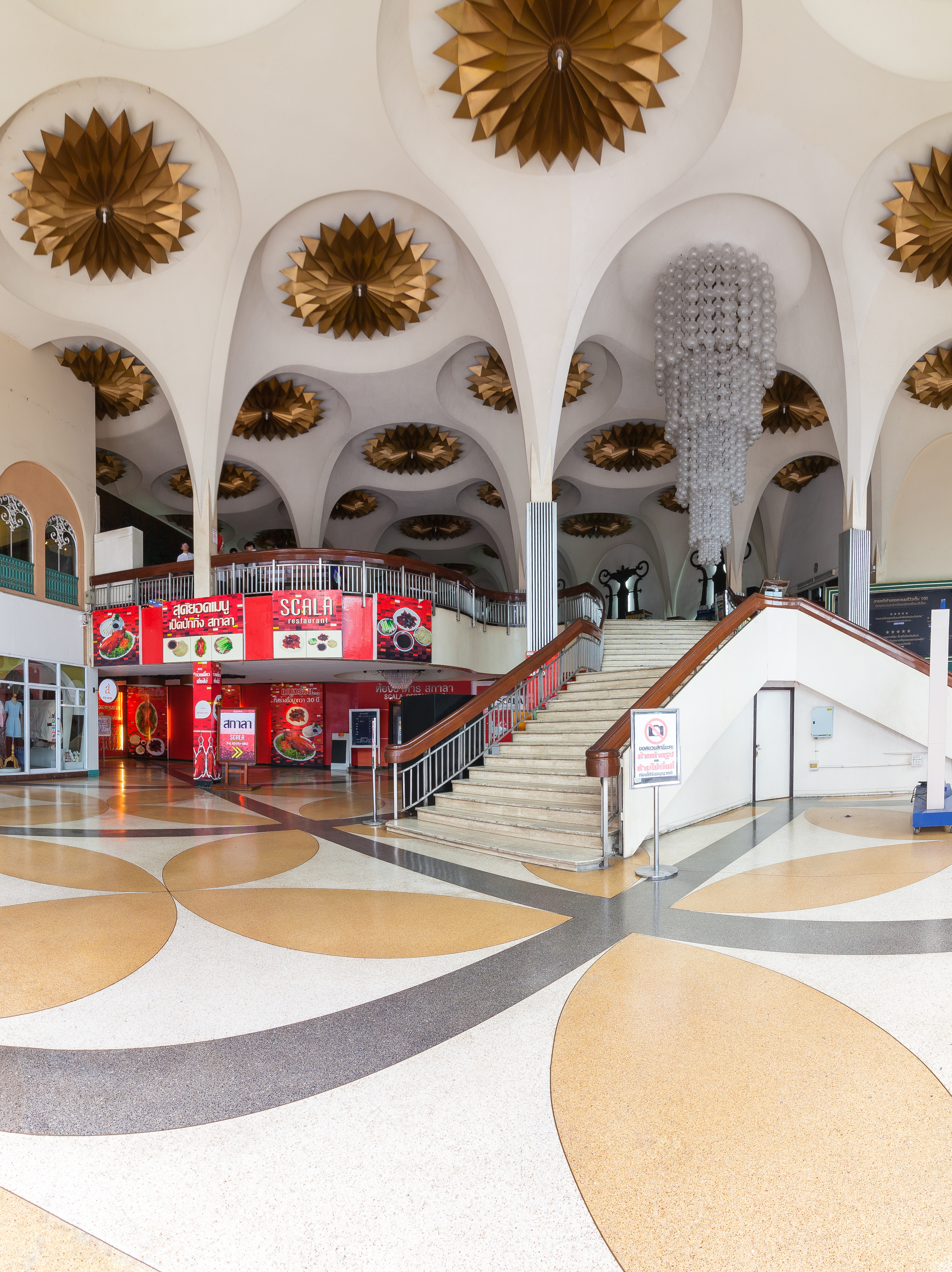
Scala lobby

The Scala Cinema (Note: Thai: โรงภาพยนตร์สกาล่า) was a thousand-seat (Note: Some sources claim 800 seats, other sources say 1,000 seats.) movie theater in Bangkok, Thailand, named after the Teatro alla Scala, Milan's opera house. Scala opened on 31 December 1969 with a screening of The Undefeated (1969), a US Western starring John Wayne and Rock Hudson. It closed on 5 July 2020, showing, as its last film, Cinema Paradiso. The Scala, called "...the finest movie theater left in Southeast Asia" was the last stand-alone cinema in Bangkok, down from roughly 140 movie houses in the 1950s and 1960s.

The area where Scala Cinema once stood is currently under development by Central Pattana to build a mixed-use development called § CenTRal cENtrAL.

== History ==
Scala, in the Siam Square shopping area, was one of the Apex group of cinemas which included Siam Cinema, Lido Cinema, and Scala. The 800-seat Siam Cinema opened on 15 December 1966 with The Battle of the Bulge as its first screening. Siam burnt down during the 2010 Thai political protests. In 1968, the Apex Group built the 1000-seat Lido Cinema. It closed its doors when its lease expired in May 2018, but was reopened in 2019 as a performing arts venue, Lido Connect.

The Scala was the last remaining standalone single-screen cinema in Bangkok, offering film aficionados a retro film-going experience. The president of Apex attributed Scala's closing to the impact of the COVID-19 pandemic and changing consumer preferences. Its last screening was shown amid rumours that the building will be demolished to make way for new development.

Designed by architect Chira Silpakanok, the building is late-Modernist in design with interior decorations in the Art Deco style. A grand staircase dominated the interior, illuminated by a huge Italian chandelier. The cinema received the ASA Architectural Conservation Award in 2012. The building's future is uncertain as Chulalongkorn University, owners of the property, searches for a new tenant. The Scala hosted film festivals such as the Bangkok International Film Festival, the Silent Film Festival, and was itself the subject of a documentary film shown at the Salaya International Documentary Film Festival in 2016.

== Final films ==
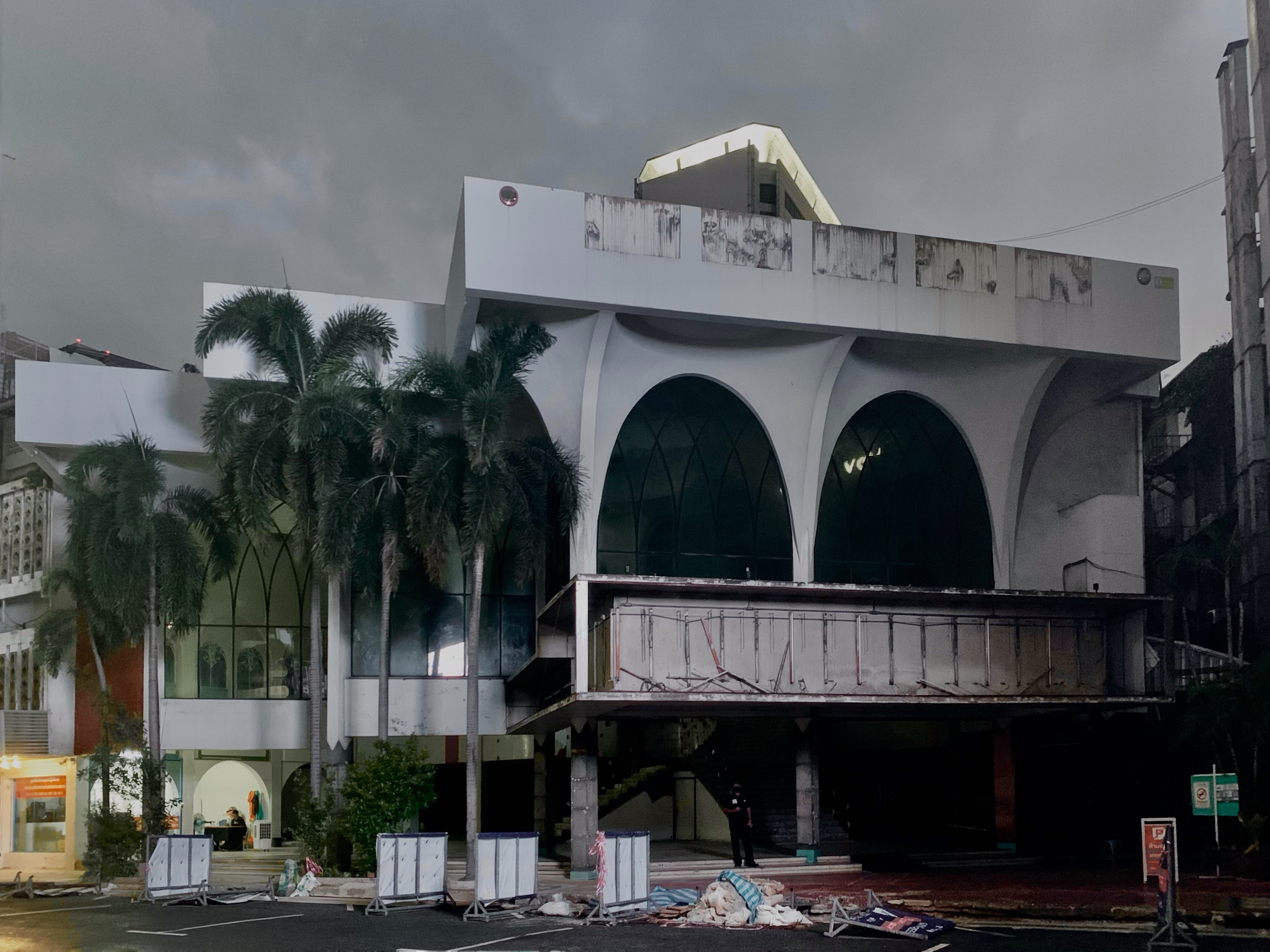
Scala in July 2021, four months prior to it being thorn down

On Scala's last day, four movies curated by the Thai Film Archive were shown. They included two Italian classics by Michelangelo Antonioni: Blowup at noon; followed by a double-bill of Thai documentaries The Scala, and Phantom of Illumination, which pay homage to standalone movie theaters at 15:00; and Giuseppe Tornatore's Nuovo Cinema Paradiso, Scala's last film, at 18:00.

== Death of the Thai grand cinema ==
In the heyday of big screen cinema, there were 700 stand-alone cinemas in Thailand, according to cinema historian Philip Jablon. One hundred-forty of them were in Bangkok alone. By 2019, only three remained in Thailand: the Scala in Bangkok, Det Udom Mini Theatre in Ubon Ratchathani, and Chum Phae Cineplex in Khon Kaen. Jablon observes that, "What's surprising is that it went from so many to [almost] zero," he said. "I can't think of anywhere else that this kind of culture, technology and buildings have completely disappeared. All over the world, stand-alone movie theatres have declined. But I don't know anywhere it declined to the point of being extinct, except Thailand. It's funny because people still go to the movies in Thailand. Thailand has a strong film industry and also imports a lot of movies. Yet, the old-fashioned way of watching a movie has completely died."

Writer Sonthaya Subyen, together with his colleague Morimart Raden-Ahmad, set out to capture what remains of Thailand's cinemas for their 2014 book, Once Upon a Celluloid Planet: Where Cinema Ruled. "Stand-alone theaters used to be city landmarks and the only mass entertainment place for people of all ages," he observed. According to the authors, stand-alone theaters flourished in Thailand between the 1950s and the 1970s before seeing attendance decline in the 1980s with the coming of VHS tapes. "Similar to attending temple fairs, locals dressed up to go to stand-alone theaters". Usually found in city centers near central markets, theaters became community gathering points. "They supported one another, the theater and the community."

== CenTRal cENtrAL ==
CenTRal cENtrAL

General information
- Status: Under construction
- Construction started: July 2024
- Completed: 2029
- Opening: March 2027 (shopping mall); late 2029 (office building); 2029 (hotel)
- Owner: Property Management of Chulalongkorn University
- Operator: Central Central , a joint venture between Central Pattana and SF2059, a subsidiary of Mitsubishi Estate Asia

Technical details
- Size: 11,324 m²

Design and construction
- Developer: Central Pattana

CenTRal cENtrAL (Note: Thai: เซ็นทรัล เซ็นทรัล) is a mix-use development under construction located on Block A of Siam Square, an area owned by Property Management of Chulalongkorn University, on the west of Siam Area and on the southeast corner of Pathum Wan Intersection where Phaya Thai Road and Rama I Road intersect. The area is being developed by Central Pattana under 30-year lease. and to be managed by Central Central company limited, a joint venture between Central Pattana and SF2059, a subsidiary of Mitsubishi Estate Asia The building will contain a shopping mall, office building and a hotel within the same 42-storey building. It's expected to be the lastest building owned by Central Group in the area of downtown Bangkok. (The others are CentralWorld, Central Chidlom and Central Embassy) The shopping mall part of the building is expected to open in March 2027, followed by the office building later in the same year, followed by the hotel in 2029.

=== History ===
CenTRal cENtrAL is located on Block A of Siam Square, a commmercial neightbourhood owned by Property Management of Chulalongkorn University (PMCU). Scala Cinema once operated on this area until its closure on 5 July 2020 due to the Covid-19 pandemic. PMCU would later announce the bidding for property developers for the plot of land. On 9 July 2021, PMCU had announced that Central Pattana won the auction for the plot of land, securing the 30-year lease.

Central Pattana initial plan involve renovating the former cinema building into a small community mall. However, Central Pattana would later alter the plan into building a skyscraper, which would need the former cinema building to be demolished in the process. The demolition of all buildings on the Block A started in November 2021.

Later in 2022, Central Pattana announced the new plan to develop Block A It later filed an EIA report. After the EIA report got approved in 2024, the construction commence in July of the same year. Later, in February 2026, the official name of the development is revealed to be CenTRal cENtrAL Before revealing official trailer on 6 July 2026, it also announced partnership with Mitsubishi Estate Asia to be a co-investor in the project, similar to another shopping mall named Central Village. CenTRal cENtrAL is currently due to be the 5th flagship shopping mall owned by Central Group after The Central Phaholyothin, as well as the 5th mixed-use development-style shopping mall in Bangkok Metropolitan Region after Mega Bangna.

=== Design and floor plan ===
CenTRal cENtrAL is planned to be distinctive from the other shopping malls and mixed-use development within downtown Bangkok by targeting the younger generations such as teenagers and students in the area. Planning to offer different products and services than the others in the nearby Siam Square, Pathum Wan Intersection, Ratchaprasong Intersection as well as Sam Yan. By featuring the open area for showcasing skills of younder generations, while the stores would also especially cater towards newer generations. Some area are also planned to be dynamic. Allowing cycling and changing the store tenants to better suit the demands.

CenTRal cENtrAL is planned to have multiple zones within the same building base. With the total of 42 floors, 2 mezzaines and 5 basement floors. Gross Floor Area of 134,200 m². Consisting of:

- CenTRal cENtrAL shopping mall, located on the 1st to 7th floor, key tenants include Tops Food Hall supermarket, fashion stores, restaurants, a gym, Hyrox training center, entertainment hall and co-working space.
- CenTRal cENtrAL office building, located on the 10th to 20th floor, total floor area of 36000m².
- 25hours Bangkok Hotel, located on the 21st to 41st floor, offering 345 rooms.
- Parking, located on the 5 basement floors, offering parking of 875 cars.

The architecture of the building features parts that are inspired by Vaults to pay homage to the former Scala Cinema building. Part of the building is also planned to be a public park named "Skyline Theatre". The building is also planned to directly connect to One Siam Skywalk, an elevated walkway that connects National Stadium BTS station of Silom Line, with other buildings next to Pathum Wan Intersection such as Siam Discovery, MBK Center, Bangkok Art and Culture Centre and Siam Pathum Wan House building.
