= History of rail transport in Thailand =

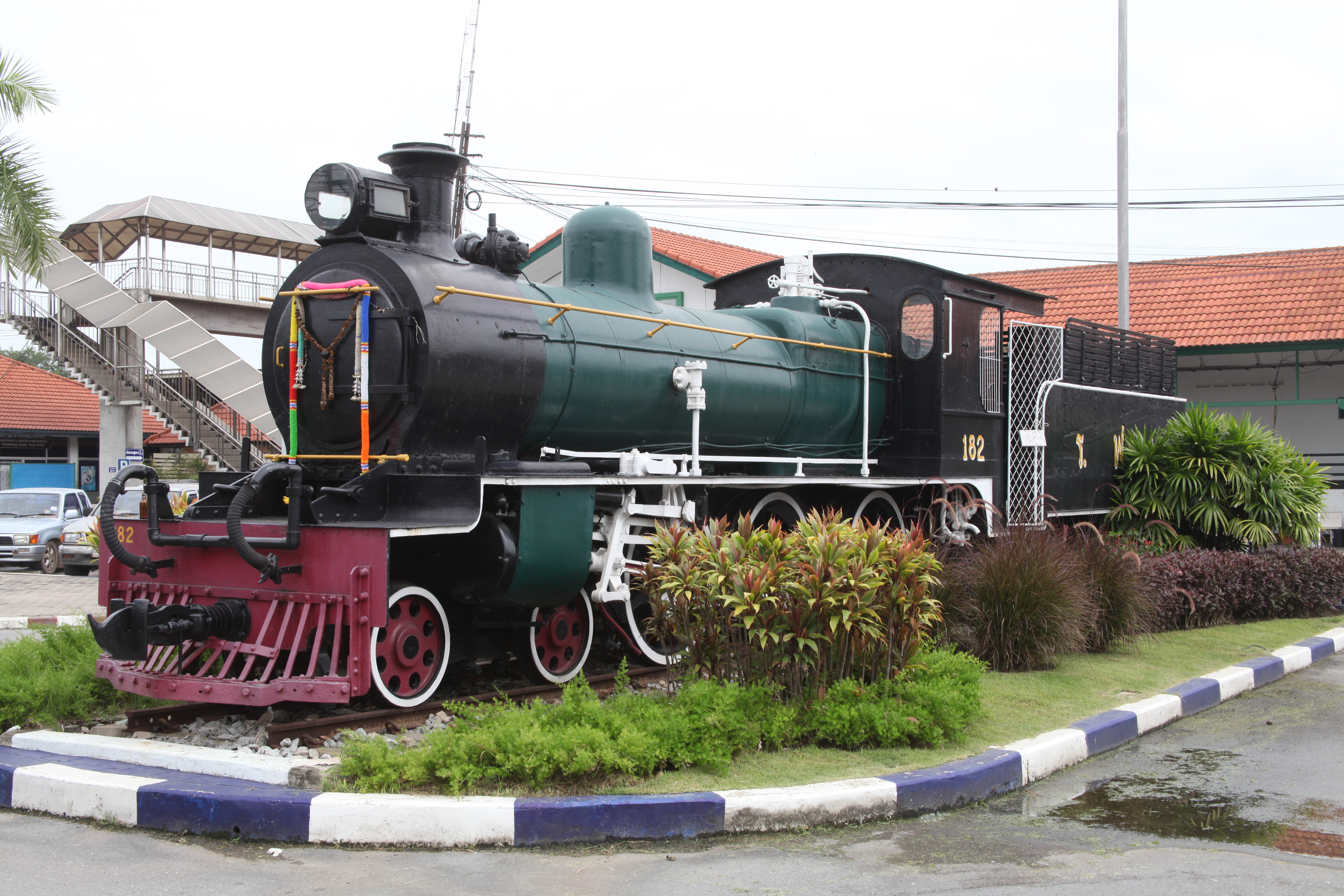
Memorial locomotive outside the Chachoengsao Junction Railway Station.

The history rail transport in Thailand began with the opening of the Paknam Railway on 11 April 1893.

== Previous history ==
The Kingdom of Siam, the country's name at that time, now known as Thailand. The first Siamese railway projects, which were discussed from the 1840s onwards, were aimed at linking the then British Burma to the Chinese market, which was to be run over Northern Siam for reasons of accessible terrain, a project that had been operating in various variations up to the 1880s, but never realized. A second, early-discussed railway project was to traverse the Isthmus of Kra the narrowest point of the Malay Peninsula with a railway because the Kra Canal was technically unworkable. However, as the British feared the importance of Singapore, this railway was not built even though the Siamese government had agreed in 1859.

The King of Siam received a model railway in 1856 as a gift from Queen Victoria, which is now exhibited in the Bangkok National Museum. In 1871 King Chulalongkorn (Rama V), who ruled since 1868, first used railways even during state visits to Java and British India. In 1864, the Dutch colonial administration commissioned the first railroad in Southeast Asia.

== Early projects (1880s-1917) ==
=== First projects ===
In the 1880s, the Siamese government issued various private consortia concessions for the construction of railways. However, these consortia were mostly speculative companies, which never even built their routes. In the end, the first viable railway in Siam emerged from a privately financed initiative: on 11 April 1893, the metre-gauge Bangkok-Samut Prakan route (Paknam) was opened by the king. The king had inaugurated construction in 1891.

=== Establishment of state railway ===
The construction of a railway network was initially managed by the Ministry of Foreign Affairs, as the technology and knowledge required was imported from abroad. In 1890, responsibility shifted to the Ministry of Public Works, where the Royal Railway Department (RRD) was created.

The government commissioned Sir Andrew Clarke in 1888 to work out plans for a railway network. By 1890 they were complete. In November 1888 the railway engineer de:Karl Bethge (from Krupp) came to Siam and was given these plans by the Siamese government for his assessment. It was agreed to build a route from Bangkok to Saraburi to Nakhon Ratchasima (also known as Korat). The Siamese government called Bethge, engaged in Germany in the Royal Prussian Building Commission, to Thai state service. He became head of the RRD in 1890.

==== Northeast Railway ====
In 1891, by law, the Nakhon Ratchasima Railway Company, the majority of which was located within the province, was established with the aim of building a railway from Bangkok to Khorat in standard gauge (1435 mm). Due to pressure from the British, the work was awarded to the English firm, Murray Campbell, contrary to Bethge's advice. After two years of preparation, the construction of the Northeastern Railway began on 9 March 1892 by the proclamation of King Chulalongkorn. The tools used for the first cut of the spade, a richly ornamented spade and the associated wheelbarrow, are now also exhibited at the Bangkok National Museum. The management of construction was assumed by George Murray Campbell.

Karl Bethge engaged other German engineers for railway construction, Hermann Gehrts (1854-1914) and Luis Weiler (1836-1918), both of the Prussian State Railways. Weiler reported to his father, who was also a railway engineer, in numerous letters. These are almost all preserved and are now in the archives of the Deutsches Museum in Munich.

On 1 September 1896, the railway administration cancelled the contract with the British company since it did not carry out the construction work in accordance with the contract. The work was now continued on its own initiative. At the same time Nakhon Ratchasima Railway Company was nationalized and converted into a State Railways administration. The completed route was 135 kilometers long at this time. In December 1896, King Chulalongkorn took the opportunity to travel by train to the construction site. On an overhanging rock at 136.5 miles he wrote his name on a rock, the heavily weathered lettering is still visible today. On 26 March 1897, the first section from Bangkok to Ayutthaya was opened. This date is currently the "official birthday" of the State Railway of Thailand. Before the railway opened, a trip between Bangkok and Khorat (Nakhon Ratchasima) took five days, by train it was reduced to six hours. The line was officially opened on 21 December 1900 by King Chulalongkorn.

=== Network expansion ===
On 24 February 1898, the government adopted the principle that all the main routes in the country should be established as national railways. Karl Bethge died of cholera in 1900, and his successor, Hermann Gehrts, retired in 1904. In the spring of 1904, therefore, Luis Weiler in Haifa who was working on the construction of the Hejaz Railway became the director general of Siamese railways. As he assumed his position, the northeast railway was finished.

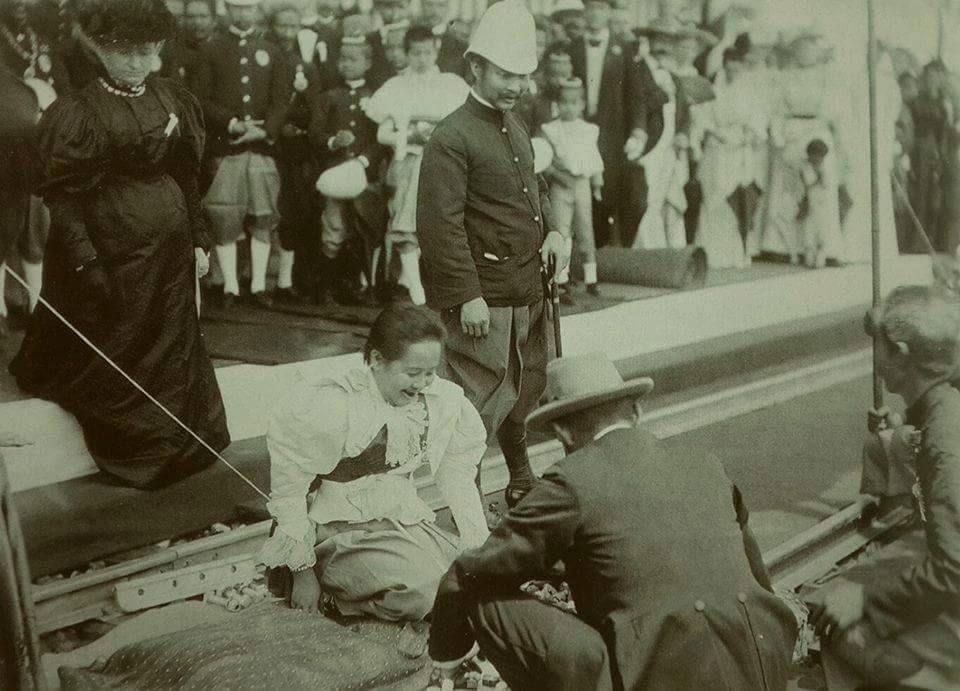
King Chulalongkorn and Queen Saovabha Phongsri opening a railway line in 1900.

Ensign of the Royal State Railways of Siam in 1898 (Original)

German companies such as Henschel and Krupp distinguished themselves by the delivery of locomotives. In 1909 a total of 49 locomotives from Germany went to the Siamese state railway. Other rolling stocks were imported from Germany, Belgium, The Netherlands, and the United Kingdom.

==== Eastern Railway ====
Another project was the Eastern Railway. In 1901 an engineer's survey of the route was commissioned. However, both the southern and eastern railways were complicated by geopolitics: to the south and west of Siam were British colonies and to the east French possessions. The French considered Siamese railway construction, creeping towards French Indochina, as a threat, likewise Siam also feared French influence increasing in the region. When, shortly thereafter, a revolt broke out in northern Thailand, the state committed its resources to the construction of the Northern Railway, (Bangkok to Chiang Mai).

==== Northern Railway ====
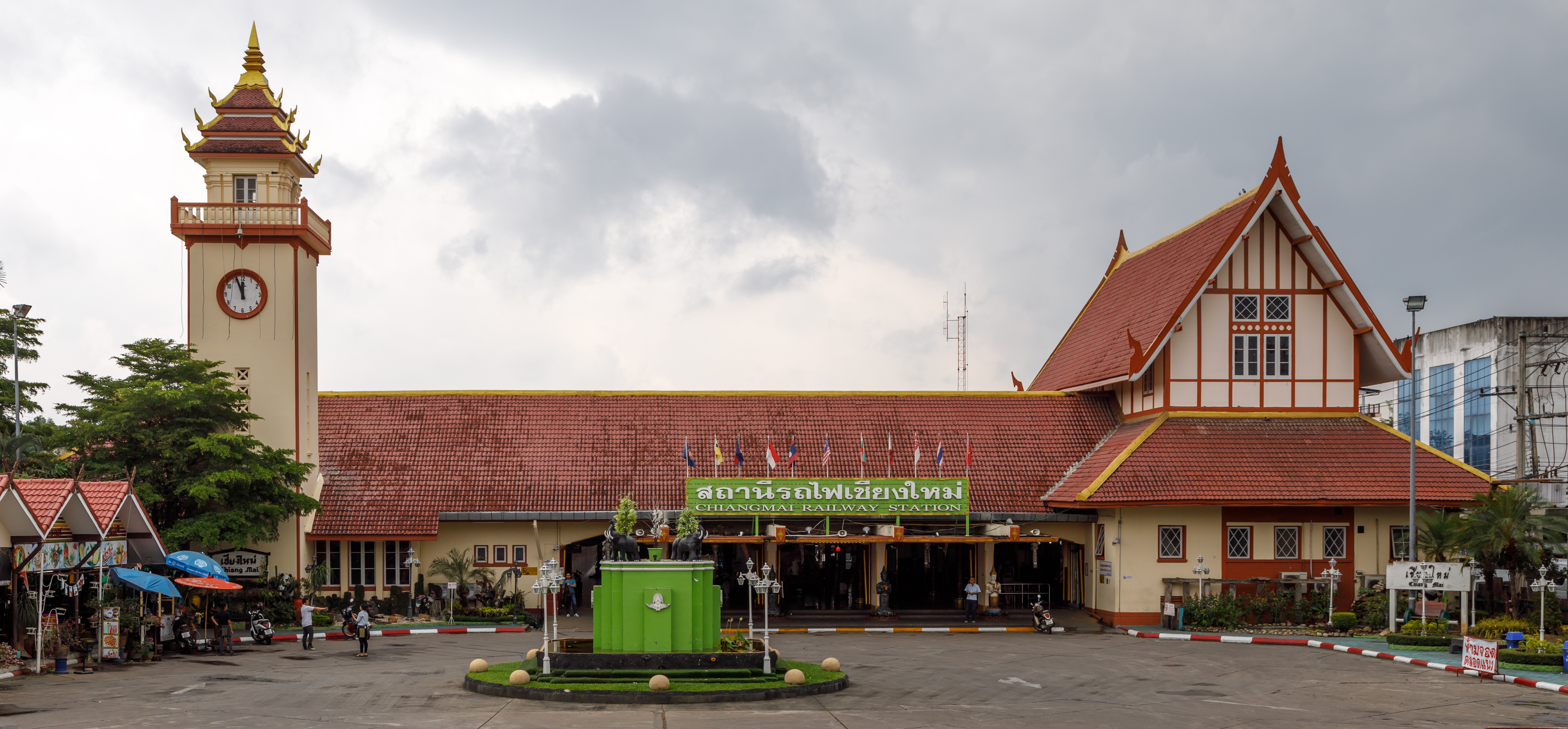
Chiang Mai Railway Station

There has been substantial amount of pressure from the foreigners for a state railway to the north. The construction of the Northern line started once the Khorat line opened to traffic in 1898. The line was decided to divert from the Northeastern Line at Ban Phachi Junction, contrary to the Punchard Survey which suggests a junction at Saraburi. The first section to Lopburi was opened in 1901.

Due to financial strains, the government loaned a total of 4-million pounds from English and French banks, accelerating the pace of the construction, opening up to Uttaradit by 1909.

The construction was greatly slowed down after reaching the northern mountains. Furthermore, with the start of the construction of the Southern Railway in 1909, further extension of the Northern Line was halted and some engineers were relocated to the southern construction site.

In 1912, the construction was resumed, planning to reach Lampang and Chiang Mai. Although the construction was again stagnated due to the resource shortages caused by World War I. As a result, while the construction reached Lampang by 1918, the 109 km section to Chiang Mai was only opened in 1922.

===== Northern Railway gallery =====
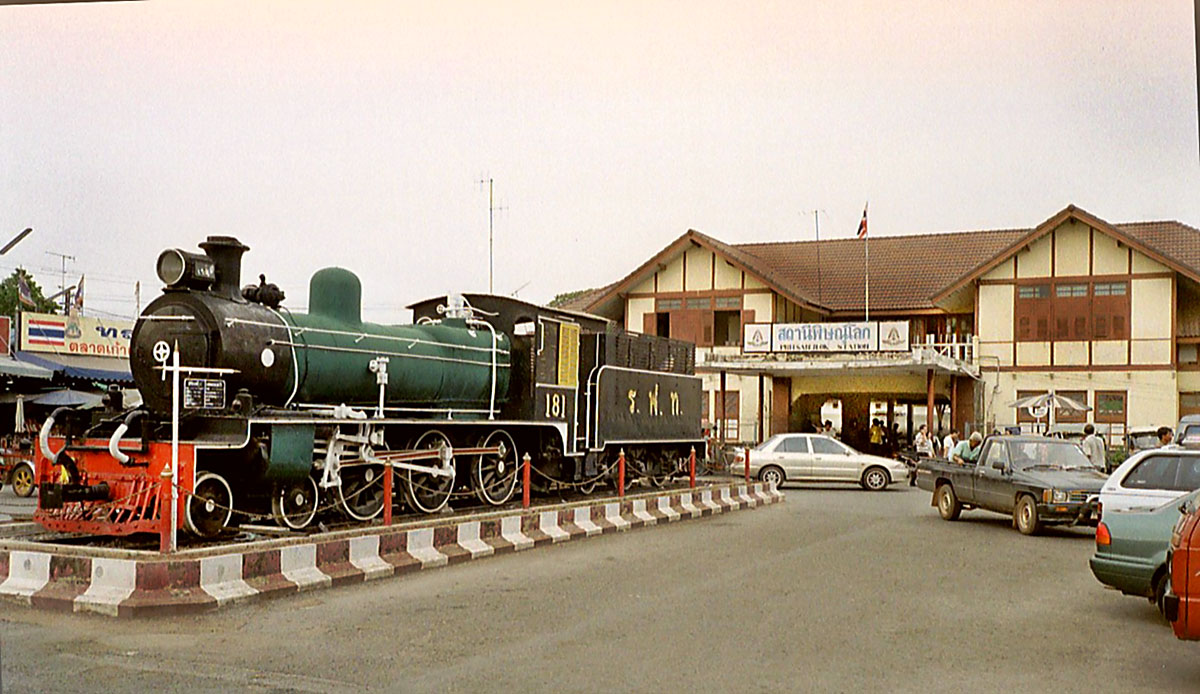
Phitsanulok station (ca. 1920 by German architect Karl Siegfried Döring).

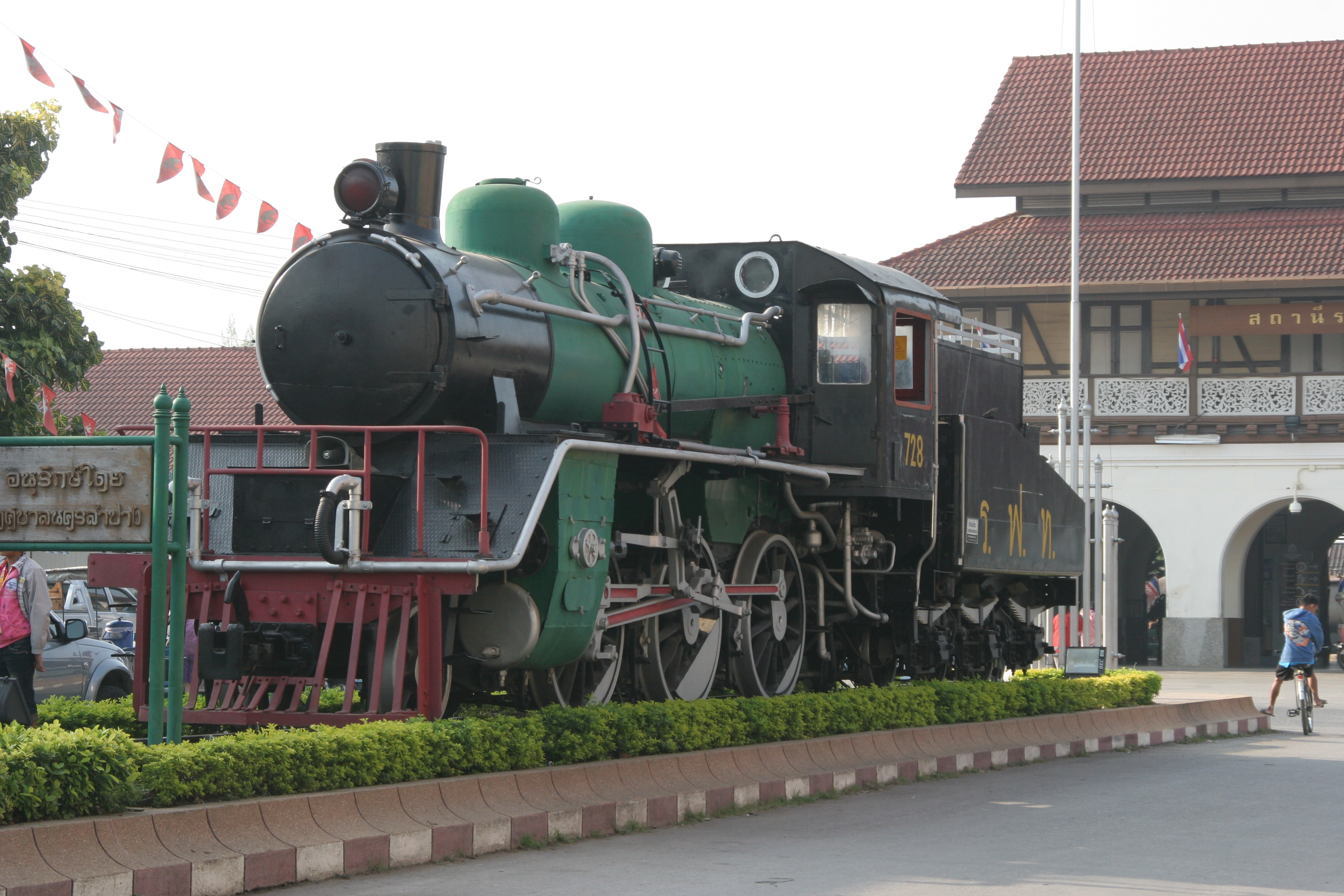
Class C56 imported from Japan on display

==== Southern Railway ====
With the completion of the northeastern railway, planning for the Southern Railway to Phetchaburi began, and its construction began in April 1900. In contrast to the previously established railway network east of the Chao Phraya River, which was built in standard gauge, the state railway chose metre-gauge to lower construction cost as well as to ease the transition to Burma and Malaya which also used the metre-gauge. This decision was made easier as the southern railway was cut off from the rest of the network as there was no bridge across the Chao Phraya River. The southern route, therefore, did not depart from Bangkok's main railway station, Hua Lamphong Station, but had its own terminus in Thonburi, at the Thonburi Station. Its station building was designed by the German architect Karl Siegfried Döhring in the style of the Brick Expressionism.

In 1909, a British engineer, Henry Gittins, was appointed as the head of the project. Later in 1913, the group separated into an independent body as the Southern Railway Department, with the RRD then renamed as the Northern Railway Department. The construction was separated into three sections with construction on all three commencing simultaneously in order to shorten construction time.

In 1921, the entire line was opened, becoming Siam's first international railway.

=== Effects of World War I ===
Siam joined the First World War in 1917, forcing the firing of 28 German engineers employed in the RRD. To solve the engineer shortage, King Vajiravudh ordered the unification of the Southern and Northern Railway Departments on 5 June 1917 into the Royal Railway Department under Prince Kamphaeng Phet, becoming the first Thai to head the department.

== The Interwar period and World War 2 (1917-1945) ==
Siam's participation in the war enhanced its stance on the international stage. With the prospect of potential colonization subsiding, Siam becoming an international railway hub of Southeast Asia became a possibility which was fulfilled by the Japanese occupation force in the Second World War.

=== Postwar expansion ===
==== Eastern Railway ====
While the project was initially suspended in 1906 due to fear of French intervention, the line to Aranyapratet was reconsidered. While the transport demand for the line was expected to be relatively low, King Vajiravudh pressed the project forward as a gesture of goodwill.

In 1926, the 194 km line to Aranyapratet was opened, however due to the French side prioritizing the construction of roads, the construction of the rail on the French Indochina side had not yet started.

==== Unification of railways ====
There were two main issues preventing the unification of the lines on the East Bank and West Bank of the Chao Praya River: The difference in gauge sizes and the lack of a bridge connection.

While the Northern and Northeastern lines, on the East Bank, use the standard-gauge (1435 mm), the Southern line, on the West Bank, uses the meter-gauge (1000 mm). In the end, it was decided that all standard-gauge lines were to be converted to metre-gauge in order to make potential international connections more convenient since all the neighbouring countries adopted the metre-gauge. The conversion started in 1920 and took ten years to complete.

Along with the standardisation of the track gauge, it was also decided to unify the two workshops into one central workshop, thus requiring a connection across the river. The construction of the Rama VI bridge was then started in 1922 and opened to traffic in 1927.

==== Coordination with roads ====
As part of the engineer shortage in World War I, the Department of Ways, in charge of constructing and maintains main roads, were put under the jurisdiction of Prince Kamphaeng Phet. The policy adopted by the state regarding land transport then became rail-oriented with roads only functioning as feeder roads or secondary transport to places where rail is unable to reach.

==== Locomotive improvements ====
In 1929, the RRD proposed a plan to electrify the 90 km section between Bangkok to Ban Phachi. However, the plan was rejected due to the fact that electrified railways were still new to Southeast Asia and electric locomotives would not be able to be utilized in other sections.

In the end, the RRD adopted diesel locomotives instead - becoming a dieselization pioneer. In 1928, two diesel mechanical locomotives were introduced, with 13 more ordered and put into service in the early 1930s.

=== The 1932 revolution ===
After the 1932 revolution, the Royal Railway Department, previously holding the authority equivalent to a ministry, was downgraded to a department. With itself now at the same level as the Department of Ways, the RRD lost its full control over land transportation.

The People's Party government began to divert to a road-oriented plan, formulating the national road construction eighteen-year plan in 1936. Rail expansion stagnated during the 1930s as budgets were concentrated in the construction of new roads. However, competition between roads and rails did not occur immediately as the newly built roads were unpaved and of poor quality due to the rapid nature of their construction.

=== World War 2 ===
Thailand's participation in the Second World War and its support of Japanese military expansion led to the Thai railway being expanded due to its role in Japan's supply lines and to its being bombed by allied forces.

==== Expansion of International Railway ====
As the Japanese forces began to advance into mainland Southeast Asia, a supply line was needed and thus they constructed a number of military railway lines connecting previously disconnected networks as an effort to improve its supply situation for their campaigns in Burma and British Malaya.

===== Eastern railway =====
After the Franco-Thai War, Thailand inherited parts of French Indochina and its railway in the east. At that point, the railway from Phnom Penh and Aranyapratet has not yet been fully constructed, with the section between Mongkol Borey and Aranyapratet still unfinished. In October 1941, the construction of the remaining section began, and on 8 December, Japanese troops invaded Thailand, took over the construction and finished the missing link in about two weeks. Trains started running between Phnom Penh and Bangkok on 22 December.

Since the Eastern line was originally planned as a feeder line, it faced serious capacity limit and strain from the extensive use by the Japanese military.

===== Connection to Burma =====
The Japanese army also planned a rail connection between Thailand and Burma as part of a connection from Burma to Manchuria and Tokyo for its plan of the Greater East Asia Co-Prosperity Sphere.

While the Japanese forces had already secured Burma by 1942, it had relied on water transport for supplies and needed a land route. As a result, a railway crossing the Tenasserim range from Nong Pladuk to Thanbyuzayat started construction in July 1942 and was scheduled to be completed by the end of 1943.

Allied prisoners of war and labourers began the construction, but due to the severe jungle environment and floods, the construction work did not progress as expected.

In order to hasten construction, in February 1943 the planned transport capacity for the route was reduced, from 3000 tons per day to 1000 tons per day, and a deadline was ordered to be the end of August. More prisoners of war and labourers were put to work, however, due to inappropriate health measures, more than one-third of the labourers died.

The line opened in October 1943 and was used as a part of Operation U-Go.

==== Shortage of rolling stock ====
To supply its advancing forces in British Malaya, the Japanese army began to utilize Thai railway immediately and on 9 December 1941, military trains began to run from Bangkok to the south, many of which never returned to Bangkok, as of March 1942 around one-third of Thailand's wagons had been left in Malaya. Military trains operated on the Southern, Eastern, and Northern lines, causing a shortage of rolling stock, particularly on the Northeastern line.

The number and frequency of civil trains were reduced significantly, from 166 per day before the war to 96 per day by 1943.

=== Bombings by the Allied forces ===
Due to the Thai railway becoming a vital part of the Japanese's supply line, the Thai railway and facilities needed for its operation became one of the targets of allied bombings, with major bridges becoming targets. By 1944, the railway network was already severely damaged with major railway bridges destroyed, including the Rama VI bridge which became completely unusable by the end of 1944.

By the end of the war, the Thai railway was heavily damaged, with as much as 40 km of tracks being destroyed. The Makkasan Railway Depot, needed to repair rolling stocks, was also heavily damaged.

== Post-war reconstruction and development (1945-1958) ==
=== Damage from the war ===
The state of Thai railway was left in a dire state by allied bombings and overuse of locomotives and tracks during the war.

==== Locomotive shortage and lacking facilities ====
Originally in Thailand at the time, there were 186 steam locomotives, 105 of which were now unusable with 78 being in irreparable condition. A similar situation was also found with diesel locomotives, passenger coaches, and freight cars.

Measures were put in place in order to prevent further damaging of the locomotives, however some damage was inevitable.

Satisfactory repair of disabled wagons was further prevented by the Makkasan Railway Depot being severely damaged, as well as the lack of resources and equipments.

=== Recovery ===
As part of the recovery effort, Thailand purchased a total of 142 locomotives from the allied countries, 74 steam locomotives from Japan (50 of which were already brought to Thailand, intended to be used on the Thai-Burma railway) and 68 locomotives from the United States.

The Thai government continued to purchase more rolling stocks, in 1948 Thailand ordered 50 steam locomotives, 200 passenger cars, and 500 wagons from Japan. Another order for 50 more steam locomotives and 500 wagons was also made in 1950. Thailand also took deliveries of 7 diesel electric locomotives from Switzerland that were ordered before the war.

==== First World Bank loan ====
In 1950, Thailand received aid in the form of a US$25.3 million loan from the World Bank in order to assist in the reconstruction of basic infrastructure. As per the conditions of the loan, Thailand was not allowed to use it to construct any new line or purchase locomotives, as the World Bank views that new rail lines should be built using the national budget and rehabilitation of the Makkasan Railway Depot was more important in order to maintain and repair existing rolling stock.

===== Reorganization of the Royal Railway Department =====
Another condition set by the World Bank was for the Royal Railway Department to be reorganized into an independent state enterprise in order to give it more flexibility and maintain profit. As such, on 1 July 1951, the Royal Railway Department became a new state enterprise under the name of the State Railway of Thailand (SRT).

Though the SRT should be more profitable and flexible in theory, in practice the government restricted fare hikes in fear of public opposition.

==== Second World Bank loan ====
Later, in 1955, the SRT formulated a five-year priority investment program and submitted it to the World Bank, receiving another $12 million loan to improve rail transport in Thailand.

By 1960, Thailand's rolling stock fleet, through the help of foreign aids and loans, increased rapidly to 8,391 cars, compared to about 4,000 in the prewar days.

==== Improvement in infrastructure ====
To further increase rail's transport capacity, the rail infrastructure, particularly the traction system and the tracks, underwent refurbishment.

===== Improved traction =====
All couplers in Thailand at that point were A.B.C. couplers, introduced in 1903 to comply with the same system in Malaya. The A.B.C. couplers had various flaws: connecting and separating wagons require manpower to perform the task manually, and its maximum load is only 10 tons, restricting transport capacity in mountainous areas.

The SRT decided to introduce new automatic couplers, in order to reduce connection and separation time and increase loading capacity. As Japan managed to quickly switch to automatic couplers in 1925, engineers were dispatched to Japan to study the process. It was decided that the switching process in Thailand was to be done gradually line by line, starting from the Northern line, to the Northeastern line, and the Southern line. The operation started by the end of 1957 and finally ended in 1960.

===== Improved tracks =====
Prior to the replacement, Thailand main lines used 50-pound rails, with some replacement parts in the Northeastern line being 60-pound rails. Though foreign consultants recommended converting to 80-pound rails, due to high cost the World Bank advised a conversion to 70-pound rails. The replacement operation began in 1955 using part of the second World Bank loan, and by 1960, 45% of Thai railway were using 60-pound or heavier rails.

However, as the 70-pound rails quickly began to show signs of wear, they were replaced with 80-pound rails starting in 1966, and later 100-pound rails in the 1990s.

Along with the replacement of rails, shorter rails were also welded together into longer tracks.

=== New lines construction and closure ===
==== End of international railway ====
During the war, Thai railway functioned as an international railway, supplying the Japanese army into Burma and Malaya. With the war ended, international trains ceased operation.

The Eastern line connecting to Cambodia reverted to domestic use, ending at Aranyapratet, after the territory taken during World War II was returned to France.

The Thai-Burma railway also ceased operation as the Burmese side of the tracks were retrieved and used to restore their domestic rail, making it so that the Thai side can only function as a domestic line. While there has been attempts to reconnect the line, due to negligible demand for passenger or freight service the connection remains closed.

==== Plans for new lines ====
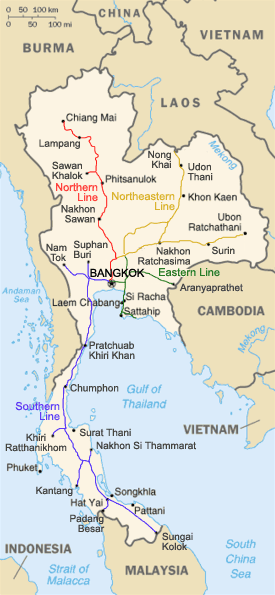
State Railway of Thailand route map (2006)

In 1949, five new lines were approved for construction: Kaeng Khoi-Buayai line, Surat Thani-Thanoon line, Udon Thani-Nong Khai line, Kumphawapi-Nakhon Phanom line, and Buayai-Mukdahan line. Priority was given such that the first three lines were to be built in the first half of the decade, and the remaining two being built in the latter five years. However, due to budget shortfalls, there were several delays and in 1958, all construction work was temporarily suspended. As a result, the last two lines were never constructed and the Surat Thani-Thanoon line was only partially built, leaving the Kaeng Khoi-Buayai line and Udon Thani-Nong Khai line as the only two completely finished lines out of the five planned.

The Kaeng Khoi-Buayai line were to be a bypass route for the Northeastern line since the Dong Phayayen pass had become a bottleneck. The first section between Kaeng Khoi and Suranarai opened in 1956.

The Surat Thani-Thanoon line resumed construction in 1951 and opened to traffic as far as Khiri Rat Nikhom in 1956, and due to budget shortfalls further extension to Thanoon was never built.

The Udon Thani-Nong Khai line began construction in 1954. The line became a priority after the United States government needed access to Laos, and so with aid from the United States the line was rapidly built and was completed in 1955 with the terminus in the city's downtown. The line was also extended to reach the Mekong River in 1958.

In response to increasing tension in the region due to the Cold War, military lines were also planned.

The government planned a new line between Nong Pladuk and Lopburi as a bypass from the Southern line to the Northern line for military purposes. As the two lines were separated by the Chao Praya River with the only connection being the Rama VI Bridge, the bypass would allow the Northern and Southern lines to connect even if the bridge was rendered unusable or destroyed. The construction of the section between Nong Pladuk and Suphanburi then began in 1954. Due to budget shortfalls, the remaining section from Suphanburi to Lopburi was never constructed.

== The decline of rail transport (1958-1980s) ==
=== Competition with road transport ===
The state of the national highways before 1958 were generally poor and unpaved, particularly in sections distant from Bangkok. The poor condition of these roads meant that rail transport continued to be an important mode of national transportation even during the road-oriented period from the policy shift after the 1932 revolution.

The Mittraphap Road, built with help from United States' foreign aid, was the first high-standard highway in Thailand. It opened to traffic in 1958, with an extension to Nong Khai completed in 1965. With its opening, the Sarit government began a shift in transport policy, and from 1963 onwards construction of high-quality highways in Thailand progressed rapidly. The total length of paved roads increased from 3,123 km in 1960 to 10,000 km in 1970 and 39,931 km in 1990.

Along with the increase in high-standard highways, the number of motor vehicles also increased rapidly, further increasing the use of road transport and decreasing the demand for rail transport.

==== Closure of railways in Bangkok ====
The Highway-oriented policy was also implemented in Bangkok. Tramways were abolished in order to widen the streets and by 1968, all tram services were suspended. Level crossings also generated congestion, as such there were plans to rid the inner city of railways and replace them with roads. The Paknam line and Meaklong line became victims of the policy, the Paknam line was abolished entirely to make way for the Rama IV Road and the Maeklong line was shortened to eliminate level crossings in the inner city.

===== Proposed relocation of the terminus =====
The main railway north of Hua Lampong station has caused traffic congestion due to the level crossings. In 1959, a plan was proposed to relocate the terminus to Bang Sue station and close the Hua Lampong station. However, as the relocation would include many facilities as well as a need for a new connection to the Eastern line, the relocation plan was found to be more expensive than elevating tracks within the city.

In December 1960, the freight transport service was moved to Bang Sue, while the plan to relocate the passenger terminus was eventually canceled in 1964, instead opting for a plan to eliminate level crossings. In 1966, an agreement was made between the SRT and the Bangkok municipality to construct 14 bridges, however the construction of bridges was stalled due to disagreements. Later the Hopewell plan aimed to solve the disagreement by fully elevating the railways, however it too was eventually stalled.

=== Rail's adaptation ===
With the competition with motor vehicles increasing, the railway began to implement new measures to improve its service such as the modernization of its rolling stocks, introduction of new faster and more frequent routes, and new special routes to attract more passengers.

==== Dieselization of locomotives ====
An important step in modernizing rail transport in Thailand was the decision to replace the entire locomotive fleet with diesel locomotives.

By the 1950s, the SRT had stopped purchasing steam locomotives and diesel locomotives were gradually added to replace them. In 1961, following a rapid depletion of firewood needed to run steam locomotives, the SRT finally decided to completely dieselize its locomotives by the end of the 1970s. Over that period, the number of diesel locomotives increased rapidly, from 64 cars in 1960 to 244 cars in 1975, while steam locomotives' prevalence decreased dramatically, from 306 in 1960 to only 7 in 1985, with some remaining maintained for special occasions.

Diesel locomotives allowed trains to run faster and require less frequent refueling.

==== Long-distance night trains ====
To accommodate increasing numbers of passengers, the SRT began to operate long-distance night time trains. In 1965, the rapid train between Thonburi and Su-ngai Kolok began night time operation, along with other rapid and express routes. Ordinary trains, running shorter distances, also began operating night time services as well in the 1960s, with the first service between Bangkok and Phitsanulok starting in 1961.

=== New line constructions ===
Thailand saw little expansion of its railway network after the 1960s, only seeing an increase of about 360 km from 1960 to 1990. The plan to construct five new lines, introduced in the 1950s, was partly suspended by the Sarit government, with only two lines, the Kaeng Khoi-Buayai line and the Suphan Buri line, resuming construction.

== 21st Century Developments ==
As of 2026, the government of Thailand was in the process of implementing a multi-phase rail improvement project that included double-tracking approximately 1,500 kilometers of high-traffic routes, as well as the addition of a high-speed Bangkok-Nakhon Ratchasima rail line which was expected to begin operating by 2028 and eventually extend to Nong Khai.

Additionally, the Thai government is in the process of constructing a 14-line rail system within the capital city of Bangkok and its adjacent provinces. This urban network is projected to include over 500 kilometers of railway, approximately half of which was already operational as of May 2026.

== See also ==
- Rail transport in Thailand
- History of rail transport
- History of rail transport by country
