= Chamchuri Square =

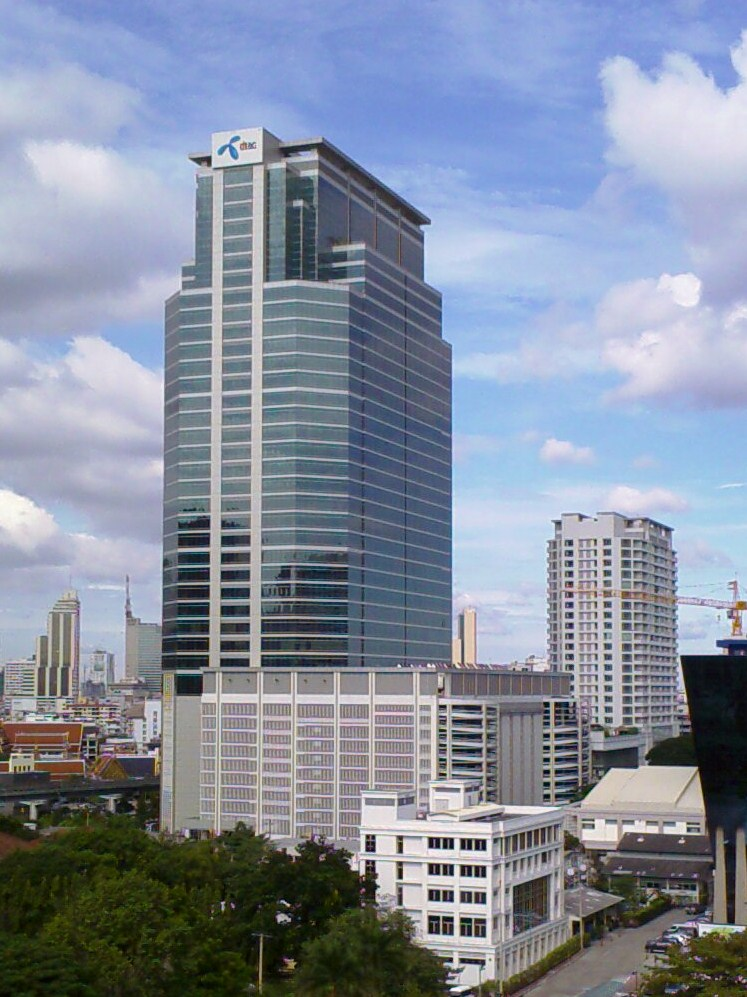
- Chamchuri Office Tower (left) and Residence Tower (right, to the back)

General information
- Type: High-rise building complex
- Location: 319 Phaya Thai Road, Pathum Wan, Bangkok, Thailand
- Coordinates: 13°43′58″N 100°31′50″E
- Construction started: 1994 (halted in 1996, restarted in 2005)
- Completed: 2008
- Opening: July 2008
- Owner: Chulalongkorn University
- Management: CB Richard Ellis (office space)

Height
- Roof: Office tower: 173 m (568 ft)

Technical details
- Floor count: Office tower: 40; Residential tower: 23
- Floor area: 274,500 m^{2} (2,955,000 ft^{2})
- Lifts/elevators: Office tower: 28

Design and construction
- Developer: Siam Techno City (1994–96); Ruam Nakhon Construction (2004–05); Powerline Engineering (2006–08)

Chamchuri Square is a high-rise building complex located in Bangkok, Thailand. It consists of a commercial office tower, a residential tower and a podium housing a shopping mall which connects the two. Owned by Chulalongkorn University, construction on the complex began in 1994 but was halted from 1996 to 2005 and later completed in 2008. With forty floors and a height of 173 metres (568 ft), the office tower is the thirty-eighth-tallest building in Thailand as of 2009.

== History ==
Originally known as CU Hi-tech Square, the project, owned by Chulalongkorn University, was to be developed by Siam Techno City Co, Ltd., a joint venture majorly owned by Thai Farmers' Bank (now Kasikornbank), Loxley Group and the Japan International Development Organization (Jaido), with Thai Shimizu Co., Ltd. as contractor, and sales management by Chesterton Thai Property Consultants. Construction began in 1994 with completion expected by 1997 and an estimated project value of seven billion baht. The original design consisted of a forty-storey office tower and a thirty-nine-storey residential tower, with a central linking podium (referred to as the atrium) featuring a convention centre, retail shops and direct access to the to-be-constructed MRT. Parking space was to be provided underground as well as in the lower levels of the office tower. The development concept was based on visions of a hi-tech office building and convention centre equipped with advanced intelligent systems.

In 1996, due to poor sales outlook, work on the project was halted when the towers had only reached their thirteenth floors. The original development plans became abandoned amidst the ensuing 1997 Asian financial crisis, which saw sharply falling demand for commercial office space, and Hi-tech Square stood derelict among Bangkok's many uncompleted buildings for the next near-decade.

In 2002, the university's Property Management Office decided to revive the project and approved 300 million baht from the university's funds for development of the project, with additional investment expected to come from the private sector. The first phase of reconstruction, which was subcontracted to Ruam Nakhon Construction (RNC Thailand), consisted of repairing and completing the basement and atrium, and began in late 2004, due for completion by the end of 2005. However, due to flooding, only 70 percent of the work was completed on time. The remaining development, costing an estimated 2.7 billion baht which was funded solely by the university after failing to attract private investment, was awarded to Powerline Engineering PCL, which began work in April 2006. The project underwent a few changes in design, including the reduction of the residential tower's height to 23 floors and the abandonment of the convention centre in favour of an "edutainment centre" concept, and was renamed Chamchuri Square. Construction was completed in early 2008, and the complex opened on 9 July the same year.

== Design and location ==
The Chamchuri Square complex consists of a forty-storey office building (Chamchuri Office Tower) with parking space on the second to tenth floors; a twenty-three-storey luxury apartment building (Residence Tower) featuring 126 standard rooms let for thirty-year long-term leases; and the four-storey connecting "atrium" section (Chamchuri Square). The atrium section, which is promotionally billed as "the Edutainment Gateway", is a shopping mall with 22,300 square metres (240,000 ft^{2}) of retail space featuring several bookshops, restaurants, education service centres, as well as miscellaneous service and retail shops. It is notably home to a branch of the Chulalongkorn University Book Center and an exhibition centre of the National Science Museum. The atrium is also used as a small-scale event venue.

Located on 21 rai (3.4 ha; 8.3 acres) of Chulalongkorn University land on the northeastern corner of Sam Yan Intersection (Phaya Thai and Rama IV Roads) next to the Thai Red Cross Society and opposite Wat Hua Lamphong, Chamchuri Square is directly connected to the MRT's Sam Yan Station; it was the first building to feature such an internal connection.

The taller of the two buildings, Chamchuri Office Tower, at 173 metres (568 ft) in height, was the thirty-eighth-tallest building in Thailand as of 2009. With 89,029 square metres (958,300 ft^{2}) of leasable class A office space, it was the largest office building to be completed in the country since before the 1997 financial crisis. Its office space is managed by CB Richard Ellis, which in late 2008 leased 61,500 square metres (662,000 ft^{2}) to Dtac, the building's largest tenant, in what was the largest-ever office lease in Thailand.
