= Banthat Thong Road =

Road in Bangkok, Thailand

Coordinates: 13.745°N 100.524°E

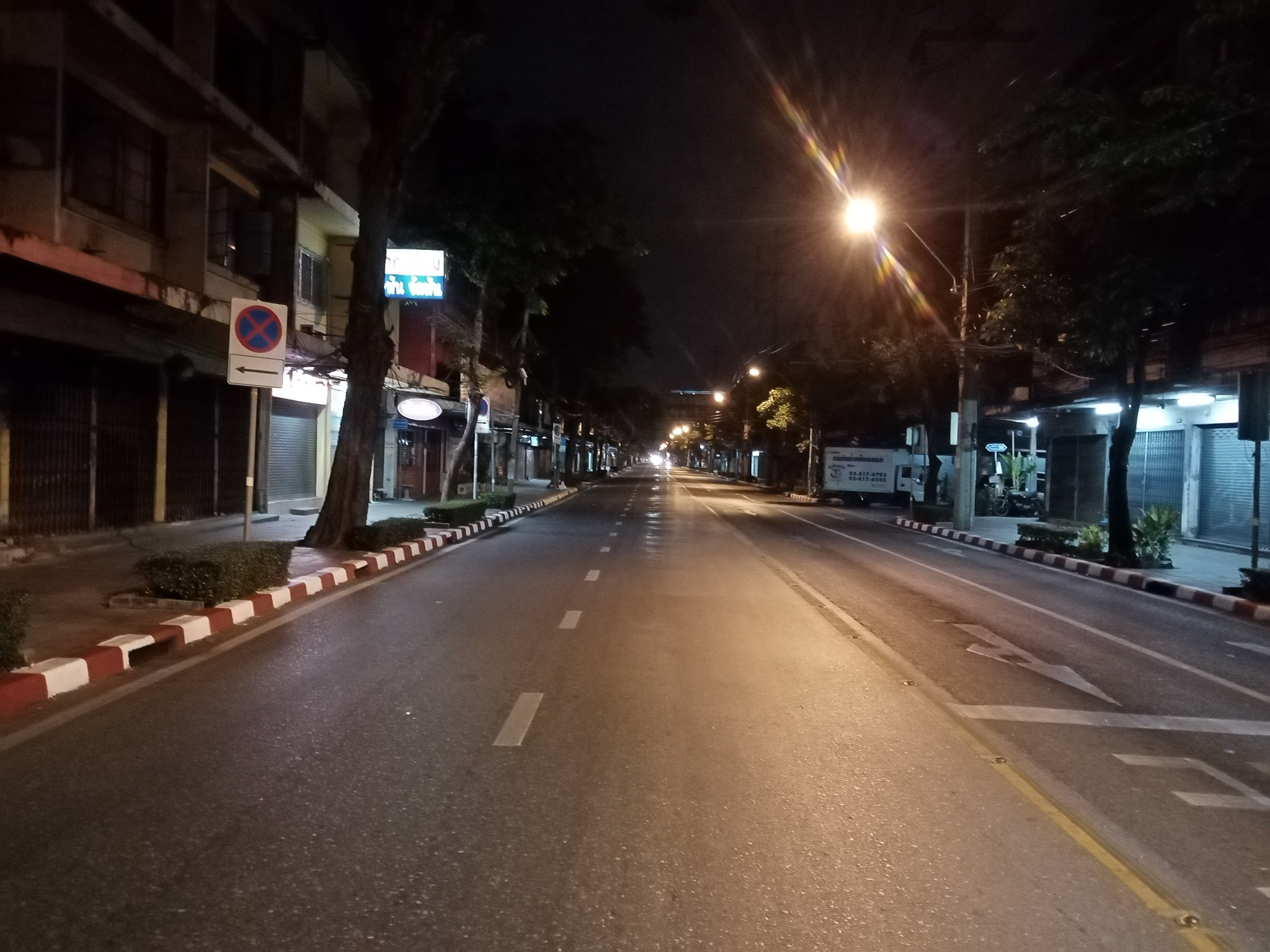
Banthat Thong Road in the area of Saphan Lueang at dawn

Banthat Thong Road (Thai: ถนนบรรทัดทอง, pronounced [tʰā.nǒn bān.tʰát tʰɔ̄ːŋ]) is a street in Bangkok. It runs 2.2 kilometres (1.4 mi) from its junction with Rama IV Road at Saphan Lueang Intersection, through Pathum Wan and Ratchathewi districts, north to Phet Phra Ram Intersection, where it meets Phetchaburi Road. It crosses Rama I Road at Charoen Phon Intersection, near the National Stadium, and the area is home to a large number of sporting goods shops. The southern section of the road runs parallel to the canal Khlong Suan Luang, which also gives its name to the neighbourhood. The area's land is owned by Chulalongkorn University, whose Office of Property Management (PMCU) redeveloped most of the neighbourhood in the 2010s. The area is host to a variety of street food vendors and restaurants, and is a popular tourist attraction. In 2024, Time Out ranked Ban Tad Thong as the world's 14th coolest street. In 2025, Thai media reported that visitor numbers to Banthat Thong had plunged from a peak of 15,000 to 30,000 per day to just 2,000 to 5,000 visitors daily, amidst complaints about inauthentic food in the area and how the neighbourhood has lost its soul, now catering mostly to Chinese tourists.

== History ==
The original section of the road, running from Saphan Lueang to Charoen Phon, was built in the 1910s and formed the southernmost part of Prathat Thong Road, which continued north towards Samsen Water Treatment Plant. Prathat thong (Thai: ประทัดทอง) is the Thai name for the Quassia amara plant, and the road was named for the plant's appearance as a pattern in Chinese porcelain, as was a common trend at the time. King Vajiravudh renamed the road as Rama VI Road in 1920.

In 1912, as preparations were being made for the establishment of the Civil Service College of King Chulalongkorn (later to become Chulalongkorn University) in the area near the then-newly built road, Chao Phraya Yommarat (Pan Sukhum), the Minister of the Capital, voiced opposition to the plan, noting that the location of Prathat Thong Road—secluded yet not far from residential areas—was ideal for prostitute dens, which at the time were legal and served as a revenue source for the government. However, his opposition came too late for any action to be altered, and prostitution was later criminalized.

Sometime later, the road became split: the section north of Uruphong Intersection continues to be known as Rama VI, while the section south of Charoen Phon became known as Banthat Thong, a corruption of its original name. The road now continues north from Charoen Phon Intersection, crossing Saen Saep Canal at Charoen Phon Bridge toward Phetchaburi Road. From Saphan Lueang to the bridge, the road forms the boundary between Pathum Wan District's Rong Mueang and Wang Mai subdistricts.

== Neighbourhoods ==
=== Saphan Lueang ===
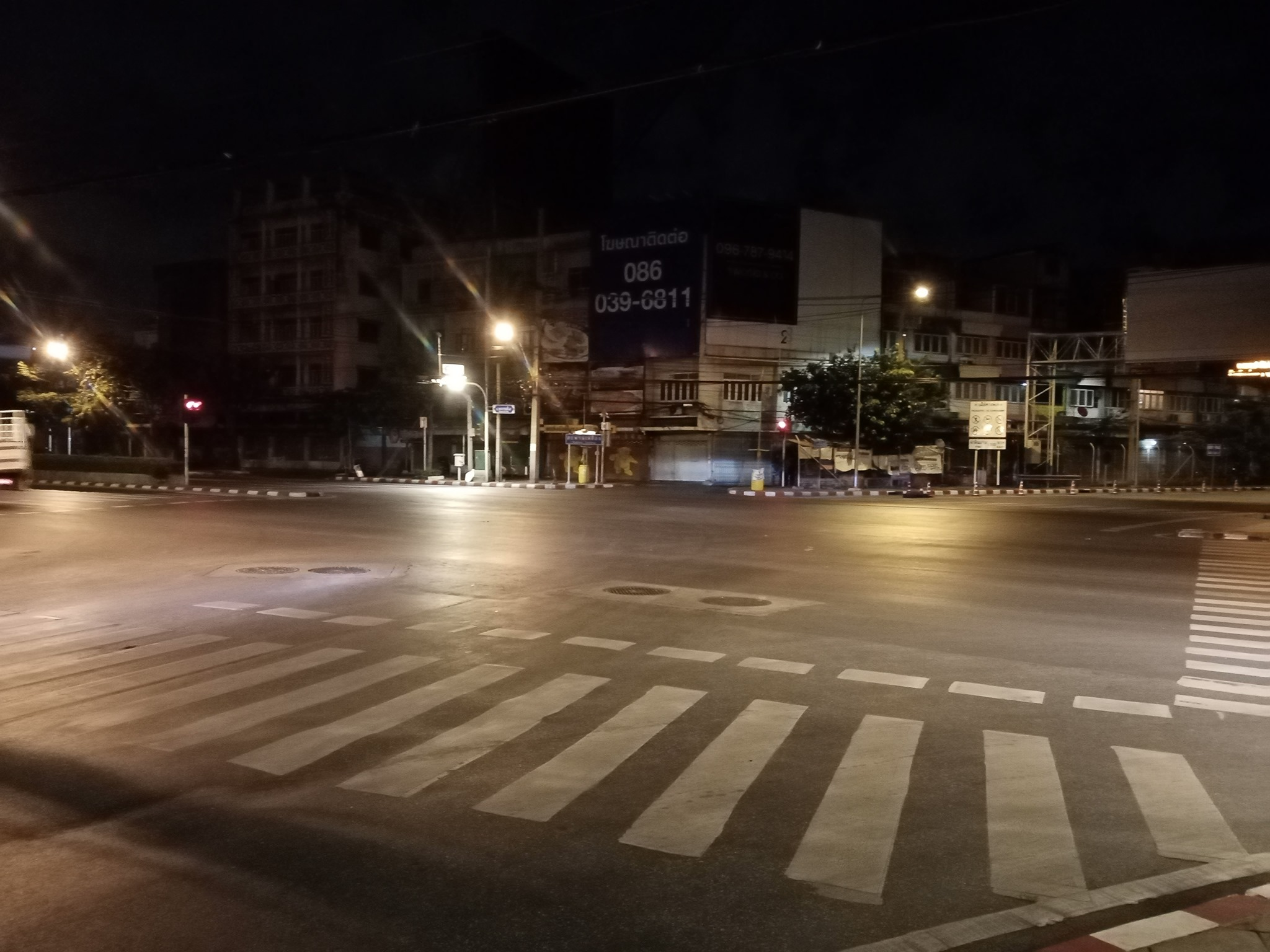
Saphan Lueang intersection at dawn (taken from Banthat Thong side)

Saphan Lueang, also written as Saphan Luang (Thai: สะพานเหลือง, pronounced [sā.pʰāːn lɯ̌a̯ŋ]), is a four-way intersection and a neighbourhood at the end of Banthat Thong Road. It is located within Rong Mueang sub-district, Pathum Wan district. It shares a border with Maha Phruttharam sub-district, Bang Rak district and Wang Mai sub-district in its district, where Rama IV meets Banthat Thong Roads and the Sirat Expressway. The next intersection on Rama IV Road is Sam Yan.

The term Saphan Lueang means yellow bridge, and was named for a yellow bridge crossing over a canal called "Khlong Luang" (คลองหลวง) that had been nearby. Later on the bridge was demolished and Rama VI Road was built over the canal, but the road's name stayed "Saphan Lueang".

Saphan Lueang is an area close to Hua Lamphong, Sam Yan and Si Phraya Road. It's also the site of one of oldest Protestant churches in Bangkok, Sapanluang Church, and had many famous restaurants as well. Among the many restaurants in the area, two noodles shops received the Bib Gourmand from Michelin Guide in 2018.

=== Suan Luang ===
Named for the canal that runs parallel to the road to the west, the Suan Luang area lying between the road and the campus of Chulalongkorn University is owned by the university and rented out for revenue. The northern part of the area lies adjacent to the National Stadium complex, and is home to many sporting goods shops. The southern area, which lies adjacent to the Sam Yan neighbourhood, used to be home to a large number of Chinese-run shophouses, many dealing primarily in car parts (similarly to the Sieng Kong area of Talat Noi). In the 2010s, PMCU redeveloped most of the neighbourhood, creating the Chulalongkorn University Centenary Park as well as several shopping arcades. The redevelopment has transformed the neighbourhood into a gastronomic destination, with many new shops as well as longstanding establishments lining the shopfronts of Banthat Thong. The neighbourhood, together with Sam Yan, was named the "coolest neighbourhood" in Bangkok by Time Out in 2020. However, the re-development has also prompted criticism of gentrification from conservation groups and students, especially Netiwit Chotiphatphaisal.

=== Charoen Phon ===
Charoen Phon is the name of the intersection where Banthat Thong crosses Rama I Road, as well as the nearby bridge where the road crosses Khlong Saen Saep into Ratchathewi District. The National Stadium complex lies just east of the intersection on Rama I Road. In addition to the area's many sporting goods shops, Stadium One, a large fitness complex and sports-oriented shopping mall, opened in the intersection's southeastern corner in 2018. The area is reachable by the National Stadium BTS station.

From Charoen Phon Bridge, the historic Ban Khrua community extends along the banks of Saen Saep Canal. It is one of Bangkok's oldest Muslim communities, first settled around the turn of the 18th–19th centuries during the reign of King Rama I.

From the 1960s to the early 1980s, Charoen Phon was known as a centre for clothing tailors.
