= Hua Lamphong MRT station =

Mass Rapid Transit station in Thailand

Coordinates: 13.7373°N 100.5180°E

หัวลำโพง Hua Lamphong
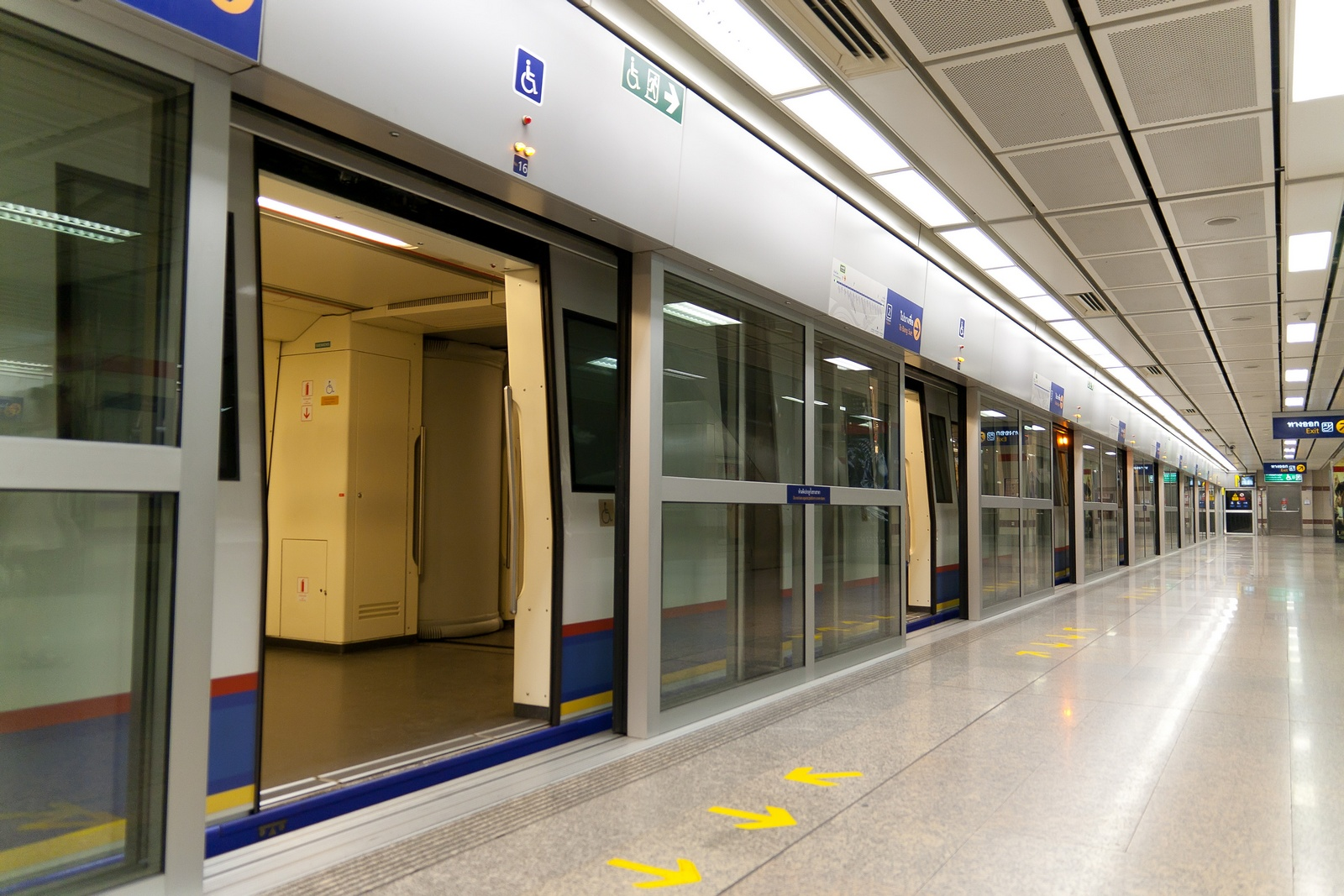
- Platform 2

General information
- Location: Pathum Wan, Bang Rak, Bangkok
- System: MRT
- Owner: Mass Rapid Transit Authority of Thailand (MRTA)
- Operator: Bangkok Expressway and Metro Public Company Limited (BEM)
- Line: MRT MRT Blue Line
- Platforms: Island platform
- Tracks: 2
- Connections: Intercity trains and commuter trains at Bangkok railway station

Construction
- Structure type: Underground

Other information
- Station code: BL28

History
- Opened: 3 July 2004; 22 years ago

Passengers
- 2021: 1,934,104

Services
Preceding station	Metropolitan Rapid Transit	Following station
Wat Mangkon towards Lak Song	Blue Line	Sam Yan towards Tha Phra via Bang Sue
Location

Hua Lamphong station (Thai: สถานีหัวลำโพง, pronounced [sā.tʰǎː.nīː hǔa lām.pʰōːŋ], RTGS: Sathani Hua Lamphong) is a rapid transit station on the Blue Line of the Bangkok MRT in Thailand. It is located underground on Rama IV Road in front of Bangkok (Hua Lamphong) railway station, more commonly known as Hua Lamphong railway station. It is the first station of Paknam Railway, the first railway line in Thailand, as well as the former central station.

== History ==
=== Construction and Royal Opening ===
Hua Lamphong Station was developed as part of the M.R.T. Chaloem Ratchamongkon Line (the Blue Line Project), which was Thailand's first underground rapid transit system designed to alleviate severe traffic congestion in Bangkok. On 19 November 1996, King Bhumibol Adulyadej (Rama IX) and Queen Sirikit presided over the foundation stone-laying ceremony for the project, which took place at the site of this station.

The construction of the station required advanced engineering techniques because it was located beneath Rama IV Road, a major traffic artery, and was adjacent to the historic Bangkok Railway Station (Hua Lamphong) and the Khlong Phadung Krung Kasem canal. The station officially opened for public service on 3 July 2004, with the grand opening ceremony also being held at Hua Lamphong Station, presided over by King Bhumibol Adulyadej.

== Services ==
Hua Lamphong Station is Bangkok's main transport hub. Hua Lamphong Station is Bangkok's main transport hub. MRT Blue Line : This is the main train line that runs through the station. It connects people to important areas such as Yaowarat (Chinatown), Sam Yan, Silom, and Sukhumvit. It also goes across the river to the Thonburi side (Tha Phra and Lak Song). SRT Intercity Trains: The MRT station is directly connected to the Bangkok Railway Station (Hua Lamphong). The SRT Intercity Trains run directly from the station to provinces in Northern, Northeastern, Eastern, and Southern Thailand. Public Buses (BMTA) : Public Buses (BMTA): Many bus routes stop near the station on Rama IV Road. Key bus numbers include:

Route 4 : Khlong Toei – Phasi Charoen

Route 25 : Pak Nam – Tha Chang

Route 34 : Rangsit – Hua Lamphong

Route 40 : Southern Bus Terminal – Ekkamai

Route 73 : Route 73: Huai Khwang – Saphan Phut

Canal Boat : The Khlong Phadung Krung Kasem boat service has a pier near the station. It is a convenient way to travel to the Chao Phraya River.

The Bangkok MRT app, developed by BEM, provides information on the MRT Blue Line and Purple Line. It helps plan journeys, including checking fares, travel times, station exits, train schedules, and parking. The app also tracks travel history for EMV card users. The app is available for free on both iOS and Android.

Features of the Bangkok MRT Application :

Route Search : Plan your trip with fare and travel time calculations

Station Information : View exit locations, facilities, and connection points

Check Train Times : Information on the first and last trains

EMV Card : Check travel history for those using credit or debit cards (contactless)

Parking Services : Check information for Park & Ride buildings. The payment method in MRT

The station provides a direct connection with Bangkok railway station via an underground pathway

Hua Lamphong station was the terminus of the MRT Blue Line between 2004–2019

=== Transition from Terminus to Through-Station ===
From its opening in 2004 until mid-2019, Hua Lamphong Station served as the southern terminus of the MRT Blue Line, with all trains terminating here and reversing back towards Bang Sue Station.

On 29 July 2019, the Mass Rapid Transit Authority of Thailand (MRTA) opened the first phase of the Blue Line extension from Hua Lamphong to Lak Song for public trial operations. This expansion transformed Hua Lamphong from a terminal station into an intermediate through-station. To enter the extension, the rail tunnels were engineered to descend sharply to a depth of approximately 30 meters below ground level to safely pass beneath the Chao Phraya River before rising back up to the surface at Itsaraphap Station.

== Station layout ==
G (Ground floor)	-	Bus stop
B1 (Concourse)	Concourse	Exits 1–4, Ticket machines
B1 (Concourse)	Platform 2	Blue towards Tha Phra via Bang Sue (Sam Yan)
B1 (Concourse)	Island platform, doors will open on the right
B1 (Concourse)	Platform 1	Blue towards Lak Song (Wat Mangkon)

== Interior ==
=== Station Symbol ===
The symbol features a semi-circular silhouette of the Bangkok Railway Station (Hua Lamphong) building. It consists of the standard shape positioned above its own inverted reflection. The color red is used to represent its status as a major business district and marketplace.

=== Station Layout ===
- Type : Underground station.
- Dimensions : 23 meters wide and 206 meters long
- Depth : The platform is located 14 meters below ground level
- Platform Design : Central Platform (a single platform serving tracks on both sides)

=== Entrances & Exits ===
- Exit 1 : Bangkok Centre Hotel, Maha Phruttharam Road, Wat Traimit, Odeon Circle, and Maitri Chit Road. (Escalator available)
- Exit 2 : Bangkok Railway Station (Hua Lamphong), Rong Mueang Road (side of the station), bus stop in front of the station, and Khlong Phadung Krung Kasem pier. (Escalator and Elevator available)
- Exit 3 : Bangkok Bank (Hua Lamphong Branch), Rong Mueang Road (Rama IV side), and bus stop for Sam Yan direction. (Escalator available)
- Exit 4 : Tang Hua Pak Building and bus stop for Yaowarat direction. (Elevator available)

== Exhibition ==
=== Permanent Exhibition ===
The concourse level of Hua Lamphong Station features a permanent exhibition dedicated to the history and development of the MRT Chaloem Ratchamongkon Line. Because this station holds significant historical importance as the venue for both the foundation stone-laying ceremony in 1996 and the official opening ceremony in 2004, the Mass Rapid Transit Authority of Thailand (MRTA) designed this exhibition space to serve as an educational area for the general public and tourists.

==== The permanent exhibition is divided into three main sections ====
- Project Background : Chronological records and the objectives of developing the underground rail network to alleviate traffic congestion in Bangkok.
- Engineering and Construction :Technical information and photographs detailing the underground tunnel boring process beneath the city's historic districts.
- Displays and Models : Historical photographs of the royal opening ceremonies, along with a scale model of the MRT train.

== Service hours ==
Destination		Day	First Train	Last train
Blue Line
Platform 1
BL38	Lak Song	Monday - Friday	05:55	00:08
BL38	Lak Song	Saturday - Sunday (Public Holidays)	05:57	00:08
Platform 2
BL01	Tha Phra	Monday - Friday	05:53	23:30
BL01	Tha Phra	Saturday - Sunday (Public Holidays)	06:02	23:30
BL01	Tha Phra	Last Train connected to Purple Line	–	22:43
