= Waziya Cinema =

- ဝဇီယာရုပ်ရှင်ရုံ
- Location in Yangon, Myanmar
- Former names: New Excelsior Theatre

General information
- Architectural style: Beaux-Arts
- Location: 327/329 Bogyoke Aung San Road, Yangon, Myanmar
- Coordinates: 16.7783°N 96.1589°E
- Completed: 1920s
- Owner: Myanmar Motion Picture Organization

Technical details
- Floor count: 2

Design and construction
- Architect: Unknown

The Waziya Cinema (Burmese: ဝဇီယာရုပ်ရှင်ရုံ; formerly known as the Excelsior and New Excelsior Theatre) is a cinema in Yangon, Myanmar. Located near the Yangon Central Railway Station, it is the last remaining theater from the city's historic "Cinema Row" on Bogyoke Aung San Road. US ambassador to Myanmar Derek Mitchell called it "one of the few remaining symbols of free speech, creativity and self-expression from a bygone era."

== History ==
The building was originally constructed in the 1920s and has been used as both a live theatre and a cinema throughout the decades. In 1964, after it was nationalised by the Burma Socialist Programme Party-led government, the theater was renamed Waziya Cinema. It reverted to a live theater in 1985 and returned to cinema use in 1999 when the Ministry of Information leased it to the Myanmar Motion Picture Organization (MMPO).

In 1931, the cinema hosted Hollywood actor Douglas Fairbanks.

=== Restoration efforts ===
Photographer Philip Jablon, known for documenting historic theaters, visited the Waziya in the 2010s. He contacted the Yangon Heritage Trust and the US embassy to Myanmar to discuss restoring the cinema. As of 2025, the building is currently being renovated into a red-carpet theatre.

== Architecture ==
The Waziya Cinema is a notable example of Beaux-Arts architecture in Southeast Asia. The façade features white Ionic columns with gilded accents, and the original teak paneling is still present in the lobby. The portico roof serves as a terrace, alongside open-air arcades.

== See also ==
- Architecture of Myanmar
- Cinema of Myanmar
- Yangon Heritage Trust
- History of Yangon
