= Sam Yan =

- สามย่าน
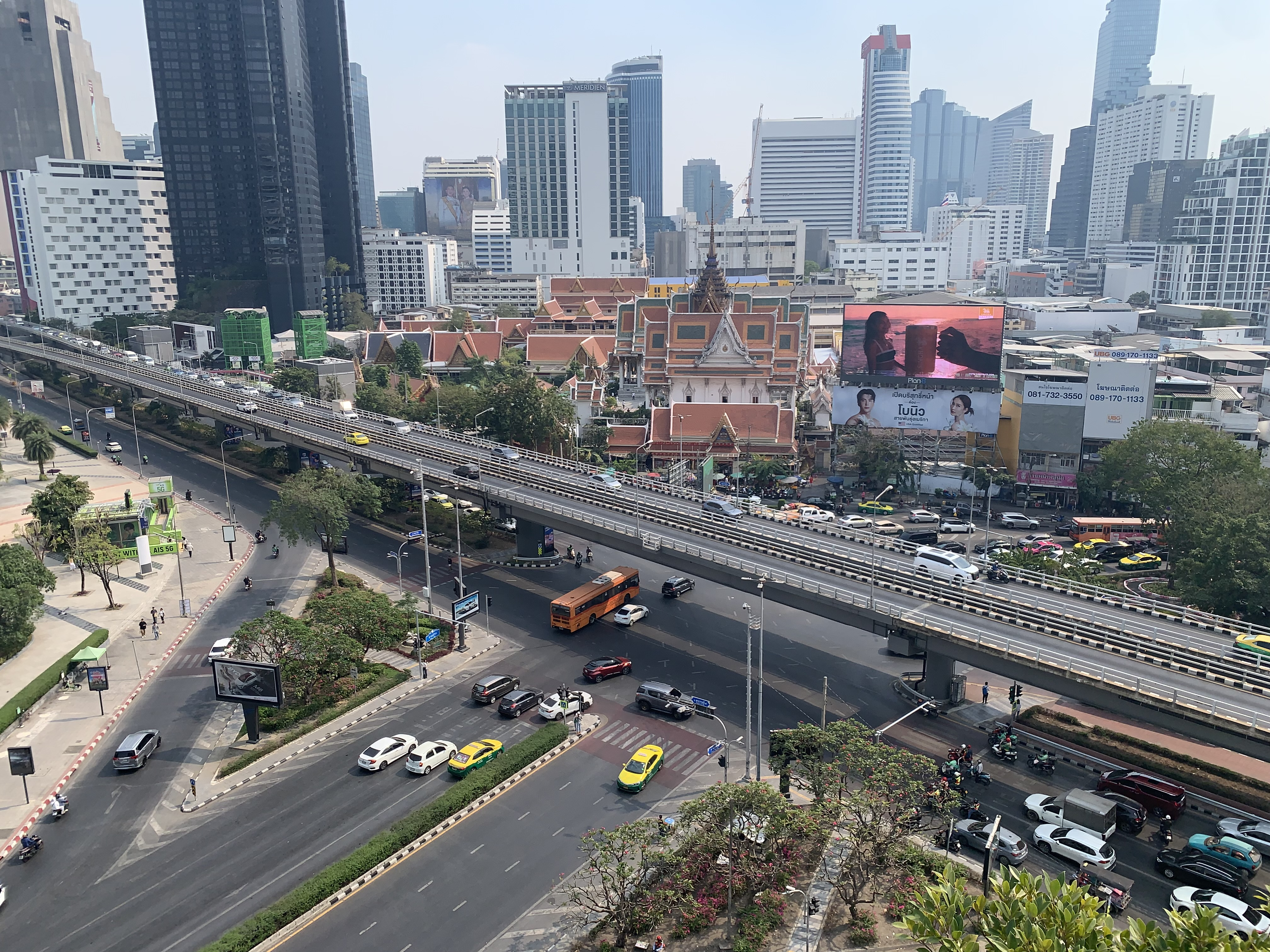
- Aerial view of Sam Yan Intersection in 2025, An Entrance to Sam Yan MRT station and Wat Hua Lamphong can be seen
- Interactive map of Sam Yan

Location
- Pathum Wan and Bang Rak, Bangkok, Thailand
- Coordinates: 13°43′58″N 100°31′43″E
- Roads at junction: Phaya Thai (north); Si Phraya (southwest); Rama IV (east–west)

Construction
- Type: Four-way at-grade intersection with bidirectional flyover

Sam Yan (Thai: สามย่าน, RTGS: Sam Yan, pronounced [sǎːm jâːn]) is the name of an intersection and its nearby neighbourhood in Bangkok, Thailand. It connects Rama IV Road with Phaya Thai and Si Phraya roads, and is located within Pathum Wan District, next to its border with Bang Rak. The neighbourhood lies in the intersection's northwest corner on land owned by Chulalongkorn University, and is famous for its restaurants. It is served by Sam Yan MRT station on the Blue Line.

== Location ==
Sam Yan Intersection is where Rama IV (which runs in a roughly east-west direction) meets Phaya Thai Road to the north and Si Phraya Road to the southwest. Originally consisting only of an at-grade intersection, the Thai–Japan Flyover Bridge, constructed in 1992, now allows Rama IV traffic to bypass Sam Yan, as well as the eastward Henri Dunant and Sala Daeng intersections.

The intersection area is served by the Sam Yan Station of the MRT, which connects to the Chamchuri Square complex and Samyan Mitrtown in the intersections' northeastern and northwestern corners, respectively. Wat Hua Lamphong sits on the intersection's southeastern corner, while the large campus of Chulalongkorn University lies alongside Phaya Thai Road to the north of the intersection.

Tai Sia Huk Chou Shrine, a white Chinese shrine dedicated to Sun Wukong is on Phaya Thai Road front of Chamchuri Square.

== History ==
The neighbourhood known as Sam Yan lies in the northwest corner of the intersection. The name "Sam Yan" can be translated as "the neighbourhood of three", referring to the meeting point of the three roads.

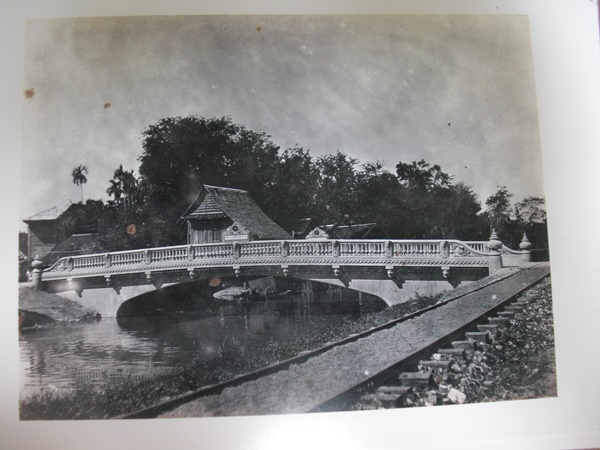
Chaloem Dej 57 Bridge

In 1910, Chaloem Dej 57 Bridge (สะพานเฉลิมเดช 57, RTGS: Saphan Chaloem Det Ha Sip Chet, [sà.pʰaːn t͡ɕʰa.lɤ̌ːm dēːt sìp cʰèt]) was constructed across Khlong Hua Lamphong to connect Phaya Thai and Si Phraya Roads at Sam Yan. This bridge was part of the "Chaloem" series, built annually to commemorate King Rama V's birthday, alongside Chaloem Sawan 58 Bridge.

The bridge once stood at the centre of the intersection where Sam Yan now lies. Later, the canal was filled in to widen Rama IV Road, and the bridge was demolished, transforming the area into the junction seen today.

Sam Yan, along with the neighbouring Saphan Lueang, is predominantly inhabited by Thai-Chinese communities. Historically, they were engaged in trading used car parts, a business that expanded along Rama IV Road from areas such as Sieng Kong and Talat Noi in Chinatown. As a result, the local culture reflects this heritage, evident in shrines and festivals like San Chao Mae Tub Tim (Mazu shrine), San Chao Pho Suea (Xuanwu shrine), and the Sun Wukong Shrine mentioned earlier. Their performing arts include traditional Chinese opera and related cultural expressions.

The university began developing the area's real estate for rent in 1963, and until the late 2000s, the neighbourhood consisted of various shophouses which held many well-known restaurants. At the heart of the neighbourhood was Sam Yan Market, a permanent foodstuff marketplace established in 1965, whose cheap upstairs restaurants were popular with students. In 2008 the university, which owns and manages the area's real estate through its Office of Property Management, began work on development plans which required the demolition of old establishments at the immediate intersection. Sam Yan Market was relocated a few hundred metres away to the northwest nearer Suphachalasai Stadium, and most shop owners followed. The plot of land was finally developed into the Samyan Mitrtown mixed-use project by Golden Land Property Development, and opened in 2019.

Sam Yan, together with the adjacent Suan Luang neighbourhood (also on university land), continues to be well known as a gastronomic destination. Sam Yan, together with Suan Luang, was named the "coolest neighbourhood" in Bangkok by Time Out magazine in 2020. However, the re-development has also prompted criticism of gentrification from conservation groups and students, especially Netiwit Chotiphatphaisal.
