= Henry Gittins =

British engineer (1858–1937)

Henry Gittins CBE
- Born: 1858
- Died: February 1937 (aged 78–79); London
- Occupation: Engineer
- Known for: Railway pioneer in Canada and Siam

Henry Gittins CBE (1858 – February 1937) was a British engineer and railway pioneer in Canada and Siam who served as Chief Engineer of Royal State Railways of Siam from 1917 to 1922.

== Early life ==
Born in Clifton, Bristol in 1858, Gittins served his articles at a firm of architects in Bristol.

== Career ==
In 1881, Gittins went to Canada and was employed as an engineer on the construction of the Canadian Pacific Railway.

In 1888, he went to Siam as a member of the Punchard survey team, which included fellow engineers Gallwey, Smiles, Hurst and Angier, a British organisation which had been assigned a concession to build railways in the country following a meeting between the governor of the Straits Settlements and the King of Siam in Bangkok in 1876. After completing initial surveys of the country, a German engineer was appointed, for political reasons, to organise the Government Railway Department and oversee the construction work which led to bitterness and recrimination, and the cancellation of the contract between the British and the government.

After the cancellation of the contract for the construction, the work was taken over by the State Department and Gittins transferred to the Department in May 1892. He worked in all branches of the department, worked in many parts of the country, and in 1905 was promoted to senior divisional engineer. The following year, it was expected that he would be appointed director but the German staff threatened to resign if he was promoted, and to avoid a diplomatic imbroglio, he withdrew from the executive. In 1906, he was appointed to the position of adviser to the government minister in control of communications, which included the railways.

In 1909, he transferred again to the newly established rail department formed for the construction of and operation of a southern line from Bangkok to the frontier with British Malaya, which was free from German influence, and he was appointed as head of the department. Within seven years, with the assistance of a £4 million loan arranged in London by the Federated Malay States, he oversaw the completion of the Southern Line and its opening to traffic.

In 1917, when Siam joined the Allies in the First World War, the Germans employed in government service were forced to leave, and the northern and southern Rail Departments were amalgamated to form Royal State Railways of Siam under Prince Purachatra as Commissioner-General, with Gittins appointed as Chief Engineer and Adviser. The prince had been educated at Harrow and Cambridge and served in the Royal Engineers, and he and Gittins became close colleagues and friends as they worked together on developing railways in the country bringing the network to a high state of efficiency.

In 1922, he retired having been connected with the railways of Siam for 33 years, and as reported at the time: "He came to a railess land, and leaves it with Chiang Mai in the north and Penang at the heel of the peninsula, connected to Bangkok by rail, the Menam to be bridged for railway purposes, extensions of the Korat and Eastern line to the frontier underway, and the preliminary negotiations for connection with the Burmah system perceptibly advanced".

He settled in London where the Siam government often sought his advice on railway matters. He married and had two sons. He died in London in February 1937, aged 78.

== Honours ==
- Order of the White Elephant, and Order of the Crown of Siam.
- Appointed Commander of the Order of the British Empire (CBE) in the 1920 Birthday Honours.
