= Si Phraya Road =

Road in Bang Rak District, Bangkok, Thailand

Coordinates: 13°43′53″N 100°31′20″E

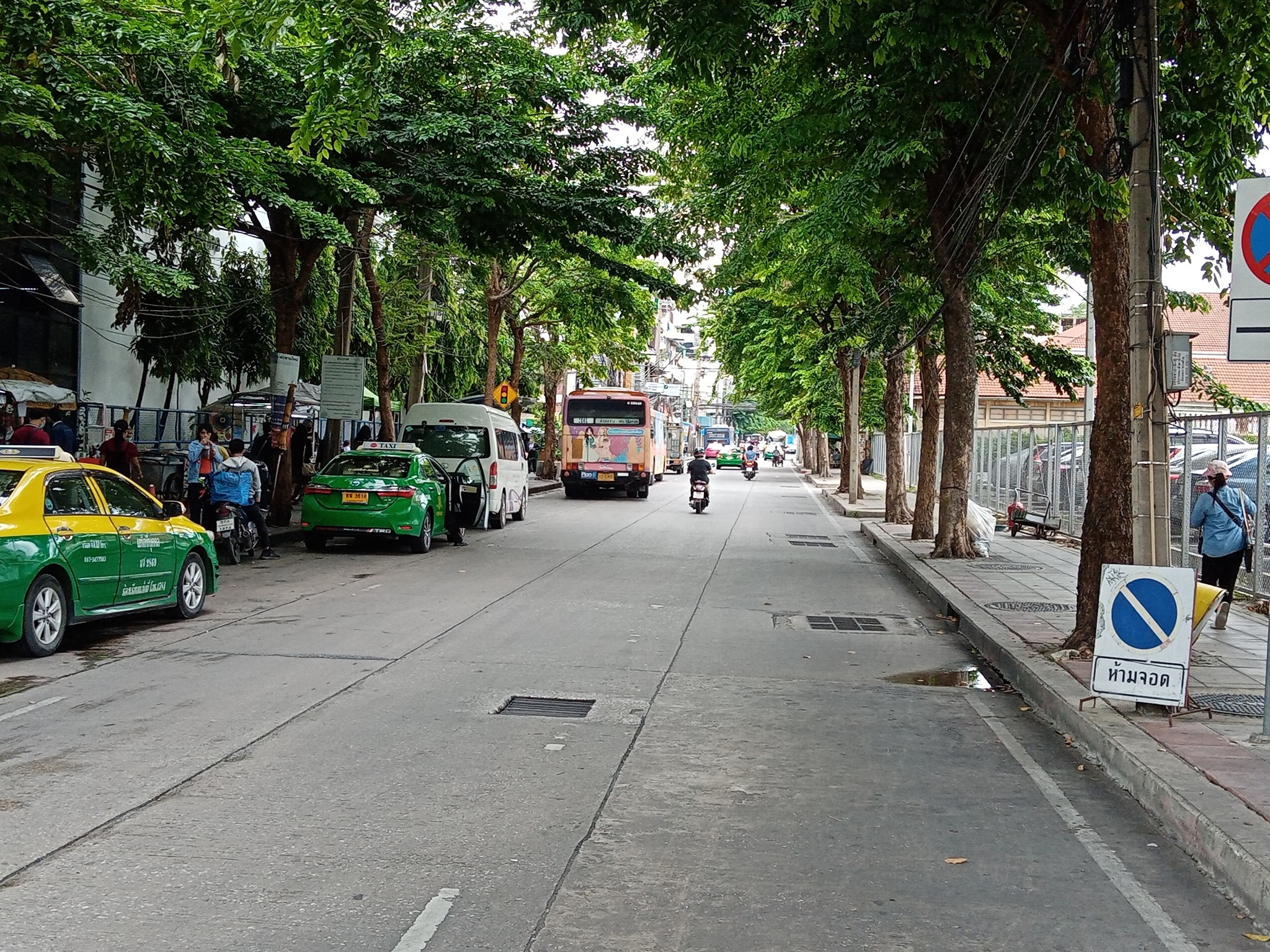
The beginning of the road; view from near Si Phraya Pier toward Si Phraya Intersection, where it meets Charoen Krung Road

Si Phraya Road (Thai: ถนนสี่พระยา, pronounced [sìː pʰráʔ.jāː]) is a road in Bang Rak District, Bangkok, Thailand. It divides the areas of Maha Phruettharam and Si Phraya subdistricts. Built in 1906 by four noblemen of the rank phraya (hence the name, which means 'four phraya'), the road runs from Si Phraya Pier at the mouth of the Phadung Krung Kasem Canal to Sam Yan Intersection, where it meets the Phaya Thai and Rama IV Roads.

== History ==
At the turn of the 19th–20th centuries, the area beyond Bangkok's old city boundary marked by Phadung Krung Kasem Canal was seeing rapid growth, with increasing numbers of Western expatriates and well-to-do members of society settling in the area that is now Bang Rak District. Enterprising businessmen, the first of whom was Luang Sathon Rajayutka, who built Sathon Road around 1890, made large profits through development of the area. Several investors followed suit, including four noblemen of the rank phraya who bought land between Phadung Krung Kasem Canal and Surawong Road, and built a road through the area, linking Charoen Krung and Hua Lamphong (now Rama IV) Roads. The four men were Phraya Inthrathibodi Siharatrongmueang, Phraya Phiphatkosa, Phraya Noraritratchahat, and Phraya Noranatphakdi. A fifth nobleman, later to become Phraya Sunthonphimon, was also a partner, though he held the title of Luang Manatmanit (a lesser rank) at the time. They donated the road for public use, and King Chulalongkorn named the road Si Phraya to commemorate the act. The road was officially opened by the King on 15 November 1906.

The road ran from the area of Captain Bush Lane (also later known as "Si Phraya Pier", after the road), near the mouth of Phadung Krung Kasem Canal where the Hongkong and Shanghai Bank was located, to Wat Hua Lamphong, which is now on the corner of Sam Yan intersection. The United Club had been located on its corner with Charoen Krung since the 1880s, and the intersection soon became a fashionable European shopping centre. The road was home to members of the upper class, high-ranking officials, and Western expatriates. Some historic buildings still stand along the road and its side streets, including 1 Naret Road, the residence of the Balankura family, which is an unregistered ancient monument.

Sap Road, a soi-like short street connecting Si Phraya and Surawong Roads, is the current location of the Embassy of Russia. During World War II, it was known as a centre for prostitutes.
