= Property Management of Chulalongkorn University =

- Office of Property Management, Chulalongkorn University
- สำนักงานจัดการทรัพย์สิน จุฬาลงกรณ์มหาวิทยาลัย
- Abbreviation: PMCU
- Type: University department
- Field: Real estate development
- Parent organization: Chulalongkorn University
- Website: pmcu.co.th

The Office of Property Management, Chulalongkorn University (Thai: สำนักงานจัดการทรัพย์สิน จุฬาลงกรณ์มหาวิทยาลัย), branded as PMCU, is an administrative department of the university, responsible for managing its real estate portfolio, which include areas in Bangkok's city centre set aside as its endowment by its founder, King Vajiravudh. PMCU manages neighbourhoods and commercial areas including Siam Square, Sam Yan and Suan Luang (on Banthat Thong Road), as well as land leased to shopping malls and commercial developments such as MBK Center, Chamchuri Square and Samyan Mitrtown.

== History ==
The university began commercial real estate development in 1963, with the Suan Luang and Sam Yan neighbourhoods surrounding the university. The development of Siam Square into a retail area followed in 1964. The precursor to PMCU was established as a bureau in 1968, and it was reorganised as an administratively independent department in 1973.

In the 2010s, PMCU undertook extensive re-development of the Suan Luang and Sam Yan areas, prompting criticism of gentrification at the expense of old neighbourhoods and cultural sites.
