= Samyan Mitrtown =

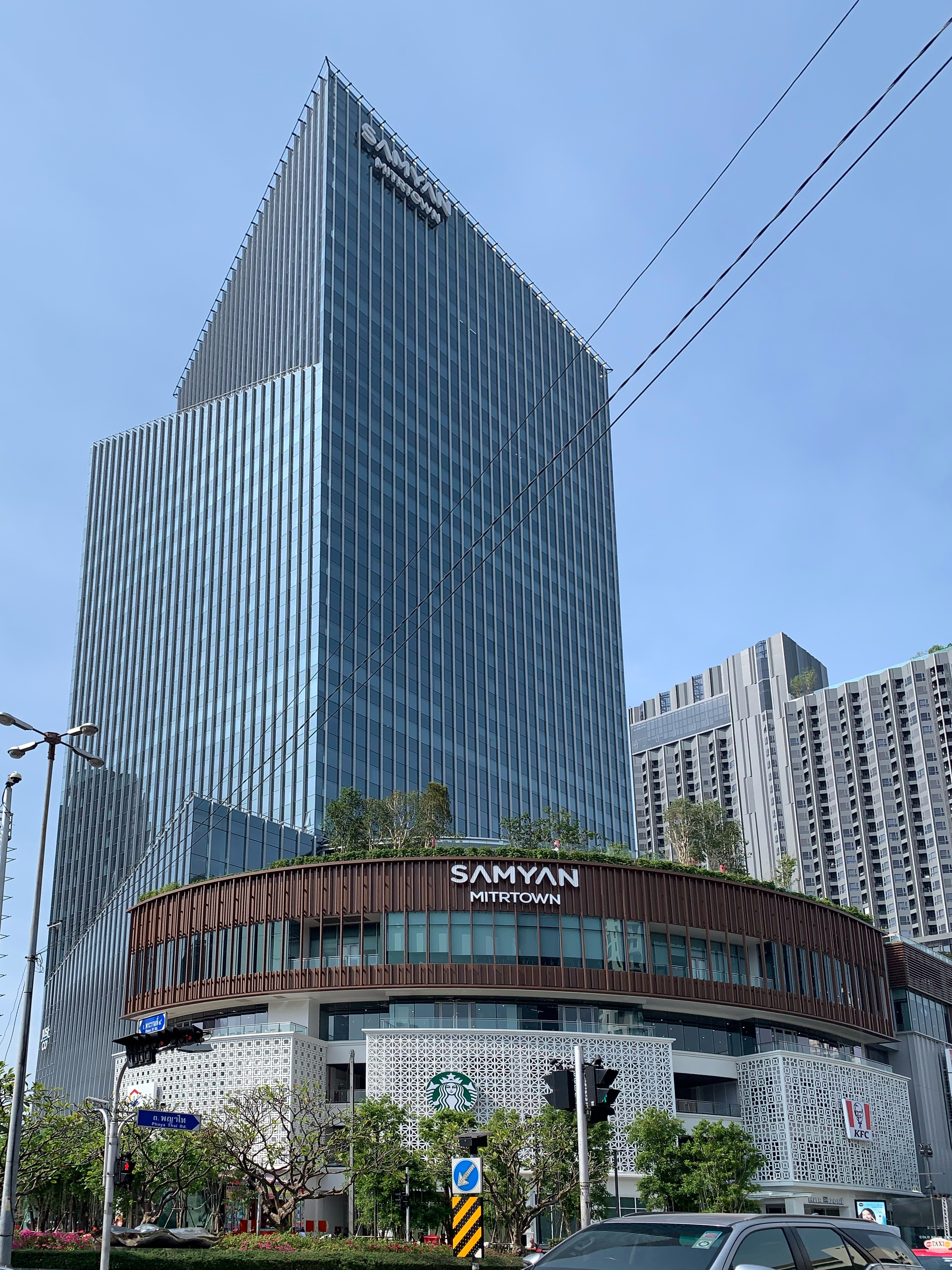
- Location: 944 Rama IV Road, Wang Mai, Pathum Wan, Bangkok, Thailand
- Coordinates: 13°44′3″N 100°31′42″E
- Opened: 20 September 2019
- Developer: Golden Land Property Development
- Floor area: 222,000 square metres (2,390,000 sq ft)
- Floors: 6 (Samyan Mitrtown Mall); 31 (Mitrtown Office Tower); 33 (Triple Y Hotel & Residence)
- Parking: 1,578
- Public transit: Sam Yan Station
- Website: www.samyan-mitrtown.com

Samyan Mitrtown (Thai: สามย่านมิตรทาวน์, pronounced similar to "midtown") is a mixed-use shopping, office, residential and leisure development located in Bangkok, Thailand. With a gross floor area of 222,000 square metres (2,390,000 sq ft), the ฿9 billion complex comprises Samyan Mitrtown Mall, Mitrtown Office Tower, Triple Y Residence and Triple Y Hotel.

== History ==
The project is situated on a 14-rai (2.2 ha; 5.5-acre) plot of Chulalongkorn University land on the northwest corner of Sam Yan Intersection, where Phayathai Road meets Rama IV Road. The area was previously a retail neighbourhood that had been cleared for redevelopment in 2008. The project, originally valued at ฿8.5 billion, was announced in 2016 and was developed by Golden Land Property Development, the property arm of the TCC Group owned by Thai billionaire businessman Charoen Sirivadhanabhakdi, under a lease agreement with the university.

Samyan Mitrtown officially opened on 20 September 2019. The name is a multilingual play on words, using the Thai word มิตร ([mít]; RTGS: mitr), meaning 'friend', in place of the English mid-.

== Facilities ==
The 6-storey Samyan Mitrtown Mall has a total rental space of 36,000 square metres (390,000 sq ft). Among its facilities include the Samyan CO-OP, a 500-seat reading and working space conceptualized in collaboration with Kasikornbank, which is free to the public and open for 24 hours.

It also has a 24-hour zone which offers several lifestyle services targeting students, workers, foreign tourists and locals with Samyan and its neighboring areas.

Also part of the complex is the Mitrtown Office Tower which features open space and flexible workspaces, the Triple Y Residence and Triple Y Hotel which offers 516 leasehold condominium units and 102 rooms, respectively.

=== Anchors ===
Samyan Mitrtown's major retail anchors include:

- Big C Foodplace
- 7-Eleven
  - Kudsan Bakery & Coffee
- HomePro S
- SportsWorld
- Medium and More
- Apron Walk Samyan
- C-ASEAN Samyan CO-OP
- Samyan Food Legends by MBK
- Celebrity Fitness
- House Samyan 3 Cinemas (Moved from House RCA)
- Samyan Mitrtown Hall
- Samyan Sky Garden
- Triple Y Hotel & Residence
- Mitrtown Office Tower
