= Chulalongkorn University Book Center =

Chain of bookstores in Thailand

- Company type: Bookstore
- Founded: June 18, 1975; 50 years ago
- Number of locations: 7
- Area served: Thailand
- Owner: Chulalongkorn University
- Website: www.chulabook.com

The Chulalongkorn University Book Center is a chain of bookstores operated by Chulalongkorn University in Thailand. It operates seven stores located at Sala Phra Kiao (Coronet Pavilion) within the university campus, Siam Square, Naresuan University, Suranaree University of Technology, Burapha University, Chulachomklao Royal Military Academy and Chamchuri Square. It offers a wide selection of books, carrying over 100,000 Thai and foreign-language titles, as well as educational media and supplies and stationery. It also offers online retailing services through its website.
