= Chira Silpakanok =

Thai architect

- Born: 7 May 1928
- Died: 25 January 2013 (aged 84)
- Education: Chulalongkorn University
- Occupation: Architect
- Buildings: Indra Hotel; Scala Cinema

Colonel Chira Silpakanok (Thai: จิระ ศิลป์กนก, also spelled Jira, 7 May 1928 – 25 January 2013) was a prominent Thai architect of the post-World War II period. His works were influential in the popularization of Modernist architecture in Thailand, and include such buildings as the Indra Hotel and the Scala Cinema.
