= Sam Yan MRT station =

Mass Rapid Transit station in Thailand

สามย่าน Sam Yan
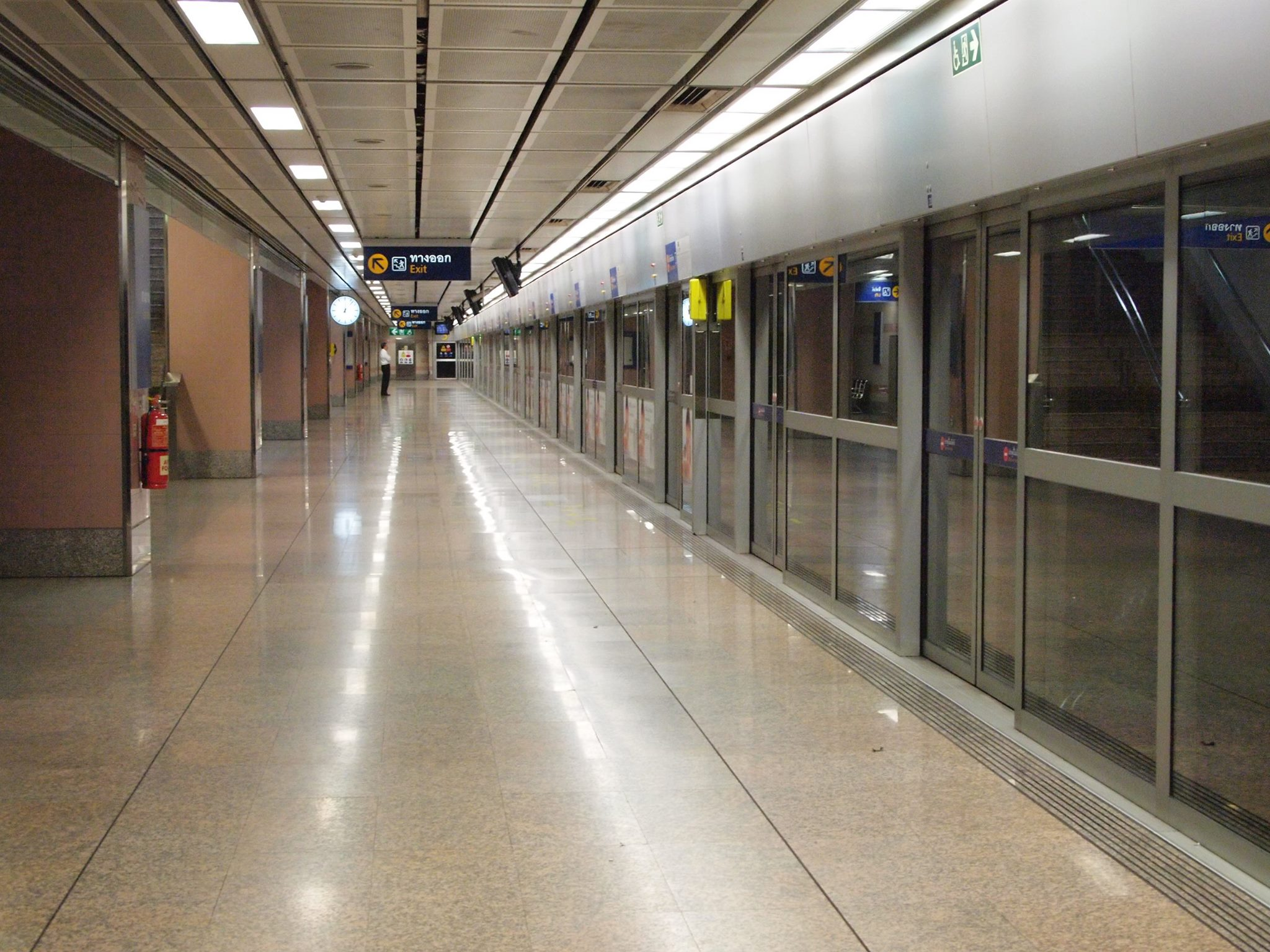

General information
- Location: Pathum Wan and Bang Rak, Thailand
- Coordinates: 13°43′58″N 100°31′46″E
- System: MRT
- Owner: Mass Rapid Transit Authority of Thailand (MRTA)
- Operator: Bangkok Expressway and Metro Public Company Limited (BEM)
- Line: MRT MRT Blue Line
- Platforms: 2 side split platforms (3 exits, 2 elevators)

Construction
- Structure type: Underground

Other information
- Station code: BL27
- Website: เว็บไซต์ BMCL

History
- Opened: 3 July 2004; 22 years ago

Passengers
- 2021: 3,542,328

Services
Preceding station	Metropolitan Rapid Transit	Following station
Hua Lamphong towards Lak Song	Blue Line	Si Lom towards Tha Phra via Bang Sue
Location

Sam Yan station (Thai: สถานีสามย่าน, pronounced [sā.tʰǎː.nīː sǎːm jâːn]) is a Bangkok MRT rapid transit station on the Blue Line. The station is located under Rama IV Road near Sam Yan intersection. Chamchuri Square, Chulalongkorn University, Samyan Mitrtown and Wat Hua Lamphong are located next to the station.

== Station layout ==
G Ground floor	Street level	Bus Stop, Wat Hua Lamphong, Thai Red Cross Society.
B1; Concourse	Concourse Level	Exits 1–2, Ticket Vending Machines, underground tunnel to Chamchuri Square and Samyan Mitrtown.
B2; Platform	Platform 2	Blue towards Tha Phra via Bang Sue (Si Lom)
B2; Platform	Side platform, doors will open on the right
B4; Platform	Platform 1	Blue towards Lak Song (Hua Lamphong)
B4; Platform	Side platform, doors will open on the left

== Nearby Attractions ==
- Chulalongkorn University
- Chamchuri Square (Connected underground)
- Wat Hua Lamphong
- Sam Yan Market
- Bang Rak District Office
- Snake Farm (Queen Saovabha Memorial Institute), Thai Red Cross Society
- Sam Yan Mitrtown (Connected underground)
