= Central Village =

Central village may refer to:

- Central Village, Connecticut
- Central Village, Liverpool, a large redevelopment project in Liverpool, England
