= F. H. Smiles =

Scottish surveyor

- Born: 1862; Edinburgh
- Died: 10 May 1895 (aged 32–33); Ban Chan, Cambodia
- Burial place: Sanka, Cambodia
- Occupation: Surveyor
- Known for: Pioneer surveying and mapping in Siam

F. H. Smiles (1862 – 10 May 1895) was a Scottish surveyor who was involved in the establishment of Siam's (now Thailand's) railway network at the end of the nineteenth century, and who pioneered work in mapping out the official boundaries of the Kingdom.

== Career ==
F. H. Smiles AMICE was born in Edinburgh in 1862. He joined a civil engineer in Glasgow as a trainee surveyor and upon qualification joined Punchard, McTaggart, Lowther and Co. of London.

In 1888, Punchard and Co. were awarded a contract by the Siamese Government for railway surveys and Smiles went to Siam to join Sir Andrew Clarke who had been commissioned by the government to formulate plans for the construction of a railway network in Siam. Whilst working as a member of Clarke's railway survey department of nine engineers, he surveyed many parts of the Kingdom including the route between Bangkok and Chiang Mai.

In November 1891, he joined the Royal Survey Department as assistant to the Director General, James McCarthy who, under instructions from the King Chulalongkorn who was seeking to modernise Siam, was carrying out an extensive survey of the country and its borders with a view to constructing an accurate map of Siam.

Smiles spent three years carrying out survey work for the government in all parts of Siam. Whilst near Siem Reap (in present day Cambodia) he contracted dysentery at Ban Chan and died on 10 May 1895. He was buried in the nearby town of Sanka.
