= Philip Jablon =

American researcher (born 1978 or 1979)

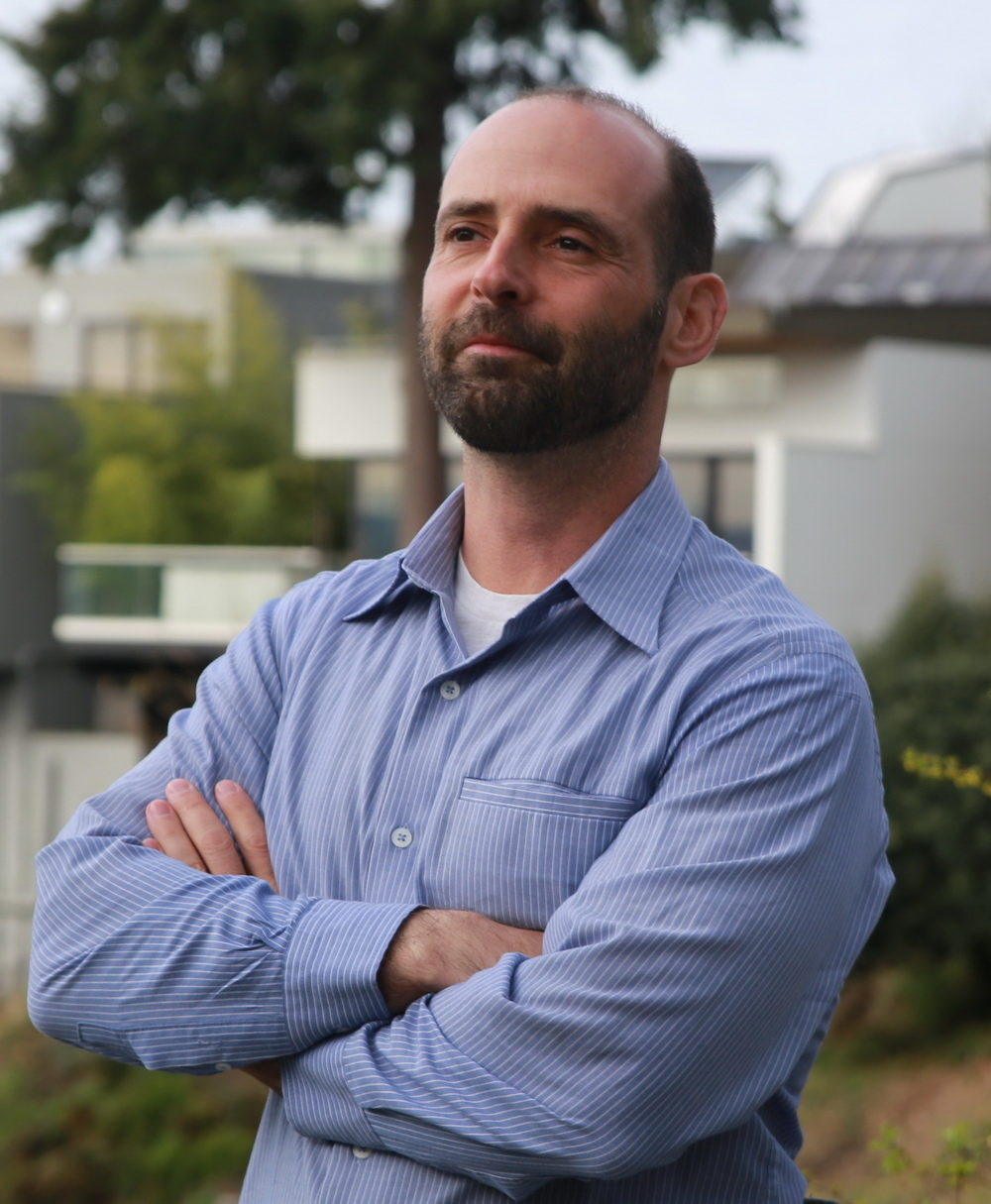
- Born: 1978 or 1979 (age 46–47); Philadelphia, Pennsylvania, U.S.
- Occupation: Researcher
- Years active: 2009–present
- Known for: Documenting movie theaters in Southeast Asia
- Notable work: Southeast Asia Movie Theater Project; Thailand's Movie Theatres: Relics, Ruins and the Romance of Escape

Philip Jablon (born 1978 or 1979) is an American independent researcher, known for photographing and documenting historic movie palaces and stand-alone movie theaters in Thailand and neighbouring countries through his blog, the Southeast Asia Movie Theater Project.

Jablon first came across Thailand's old stand-alone theaters while studying at Chiang Mai University, and was inspired to photograph and document the disappearing buildings. He started publishing photos through his blog in 2009 and has since continued with the project. His work has been exhibited and published in book form.

== Biography ==
Jablon is from Philadelphia. He says his interest in Asian culture began around age 12–13, when he saw the Hong Kong film Police Story 3: Super Cop. He graduated in Asian studies from Temple University, and began graduate studies in sustainable development at Thailand's Chiang Mai University in 2006. His project documenting stand-alone movie theaters in Thailand began in 2009, after coming across an old theater in Chiang Mai, only to find that it had already been demolished when he returned to visit a few months later. He started the blog as a side project during a time when he was having difficulty with his master's thesis. Eventually, he adopted the subject as his thesis topic, and continued working on the project after graduating.

Jablon has photographed and documented old stand-alone theaters throughout Thailand, as well as in Myanmar, Laos and, to a lesser extent, Cambodia and Vietnam. He would travel from town to town, photographing the buildings and interviewing staff and locals. He has received sponsorship from the Jim Thompson Foundation and the Thai Film Archive, though more recently he has been paying out of his own pocket. Jablon's documentation effort came as the buildings were fast disappearing—he reckons about thirty stand-alone theaters were still operating in Thailand when he began the project, a number that had fallen to four by 2016. Of the almost 250 buildings he had photographed by 2019, probably half had disappeared.

Jablon's work has been shown at various international exhibits, and he has written as an advocate for architectural conservation. His first book, Thailand's Movie Theatres: Relics, Ruins and the Romance of Escape, was published in 2019. He now splits time living in Philadelphia, where he works and saves up funds for his research, and Chiang Mai.

== Works ==
=== Publications ===
- The Decline of Thailand's stand-alone movie theaters and the contraction of the urban commons: A social history of modernity (master's thesis). Chiang Mai: The Graduate School, Chiang Mai University. 2010.
- "The 'Southeast Asia Movie Theater Project'". Austrian Journal of South-East Asian Studies. 3 (2): 278–286. 31 December 2010. ISSN 1999-253X.
- Thailand's Movie Theatres: Relics, Ruins and the Romance of Escape. Bangkok: River Books. 2019. ISBN 9786164510234.

=== Exhibits ===
- Traces (curated by Gridthiya Gaweewong and Mary Pansanga), at Jim Thompson Art Center, 24 April – 23 July 2009
- Future's Ruins (curated by Brian Curtin), at H Project Space, 28 January – 29 May 2016
- Bangkok Edge Festival, 13–14 February 2016
- Forgotten in Plain Sight: Photographs of Southeast Asia's Vanishing Movie Theaters, at PhilaMOCA, 3–25 August 2016
- Luang Prabang Film Festival, December 2017

=== Lectures ===
- "The Southeast Asia Theater Project", TEDxChiangMai 2014, 27 September 2014
- "The Life, Death and Rebirth of the Stand-Alone Movie Theater in Thailand and ASEAN", The Siam Society, 18 August 2015
- Slideshow Evening & Bar 21 Screening, Bangkok Screening Room, 20 December 2018
