= Paknam Railway =

First railway line in Thailand (1893–1960)

- Tram in Paknam station in 1959

Overview
- Status: Defunct
- Owner: Paknam Railway Company (1886–1936); State Railway of Thailand (1936–1960)
- Locale: Central Thailand
- Termini: Hua Lamphong; Pak Nam
- Stations: 23

Service
- Type: Tram

History
- Opened: 11 April 1893
- Successor: Rama IV Road
- Closed: 1 January 1960

Technical
- Line length: 21 km (13 mi)
- Number of tracks: 2
- Track gauge: 1,000 mm (3 ft 3 3/8 in) metre gauge

The Paknam Railway was Thailand's first railway line, established in 1893. Stretching 21 km (13 mi), it was a narrow gauge line. The line was constructed by the Paknam Railway Company established by a British navigator Alfred John Loftus and the Danish naval commander Andreas du Plessis de Richelieu. Construction commenced on 10 July 1891. The company was granted a 20-year concession to run the line. The opening of the railway on 11 April 1893 was attended by King Rama V who had in fact invested half of the 400,000 Baht funding required for construction of the line.

Initially, there were four steam locomotives constructed by Krauss & Co. of Munich, and four trains ran in each direction daily. There were twelve stations in all, with trains taking one hour to travel over the line. The line was initially a financial success. A motor-tramway service was introduced in 1908 and the line was electrified in 1926. After the end of the concession period, the line was purchased outright by the government in 1936 but there was little further investment in the line. By this time competition from buses running between Bangkok and Paknam was already impacting the railway's finances. During World War II the railway enjoyed a resurgence due to the impact of fuel shortages on the bus companies. Services were temporarily suspended in 1942 due to record flooding in Bangkok but services were restored soon after with twelve trips daily..

After the end of World War II, competition with buses and private cars again increased and by the 1950s the railway was operating at a loss. Several plans for modernisation were proposed but none were realised. In the end the Paknam Railway was closed at the end of 1959 to allow for the construction of Rama IV Road..

== See also ==
- History of rail transport in Thailand
- Rail transport in Thailand
