= Wat Hua Lamphong =

- (Thai: วัดหัวลำโพง
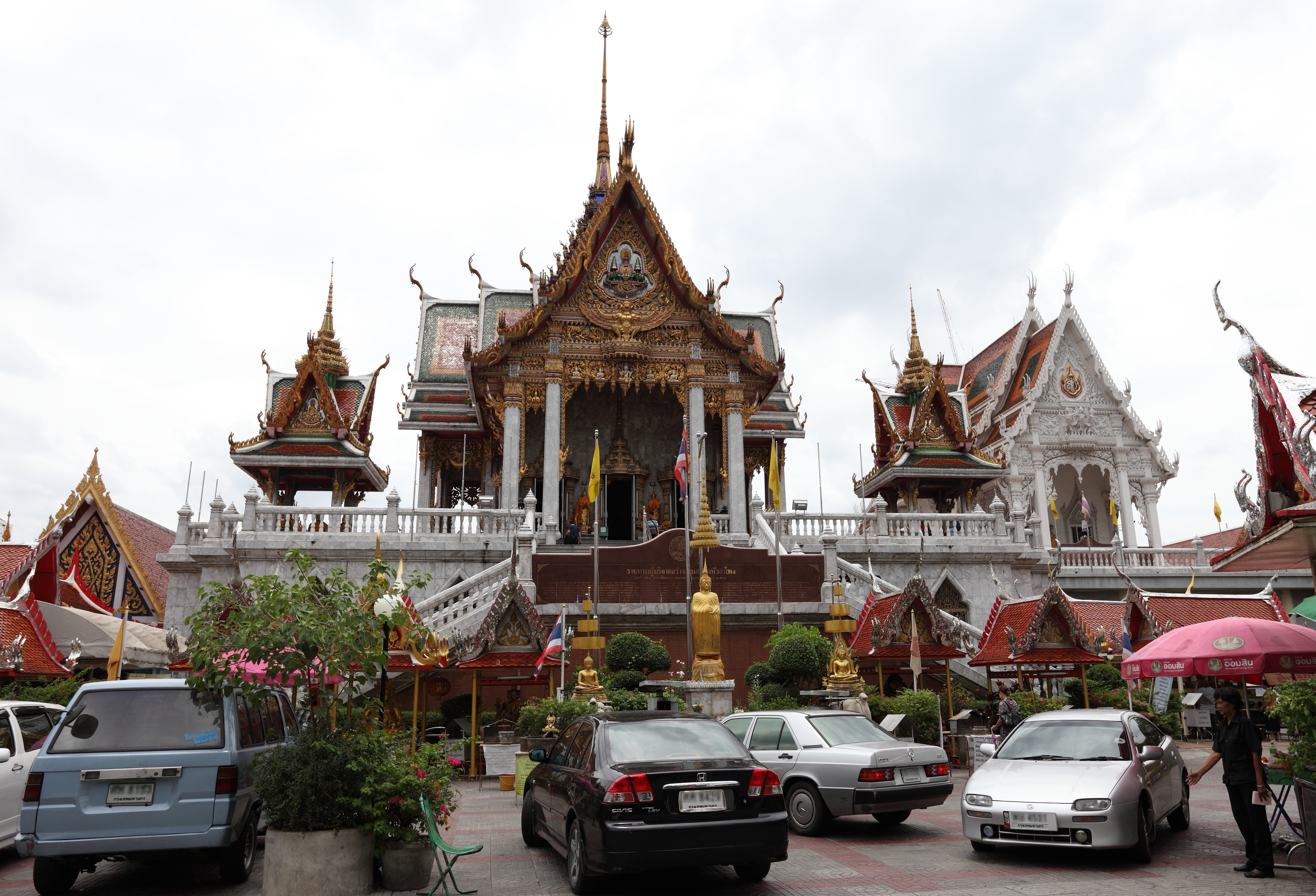
- Wat Hua Lamphong

- Location within Bangkok

Religion
- Affiliation: Theravada Buddhism

Location
- Country: Thailand
- Interactive map of Wat Hua Lamphong
- Coordinates: 13°43′55″N 100°31′45″E

Wat Hua Lamphong (Thai: วัดหัวลำโพง, pronounced [wát hǔa.lām.pʰōːŋ]) is a Royal Buddhist temple, third class, in the Bang Rak District of Bangkok, Thailand.

It is located on Rama IV Road, with Si Lom Road and Suriwong Road in Bangkok's modern business district to the southeast, and Si Phraya Road to the northwest. It is a block from The Montien hotel, and approximately 1 km from the city's main Hua Lamphong railway station. An entrance to Sam Yan Station on the Bangkok metro is located outside the main entrance to the temple compound on Rama IV road.

== History ==
Wat Hua Lamphong was renovated to celebrate the 50th anniversary of the ascension to the throne of King Bhumibol Adulyadej (Rama IX) in 1996. The royal seal of what became known as the Kanchanapisek, or Golden Jubilee, year, showing two elephants flanking a multi-tiered umbrella, features extensively in the temple's remodelling.

== Style and Layout ==
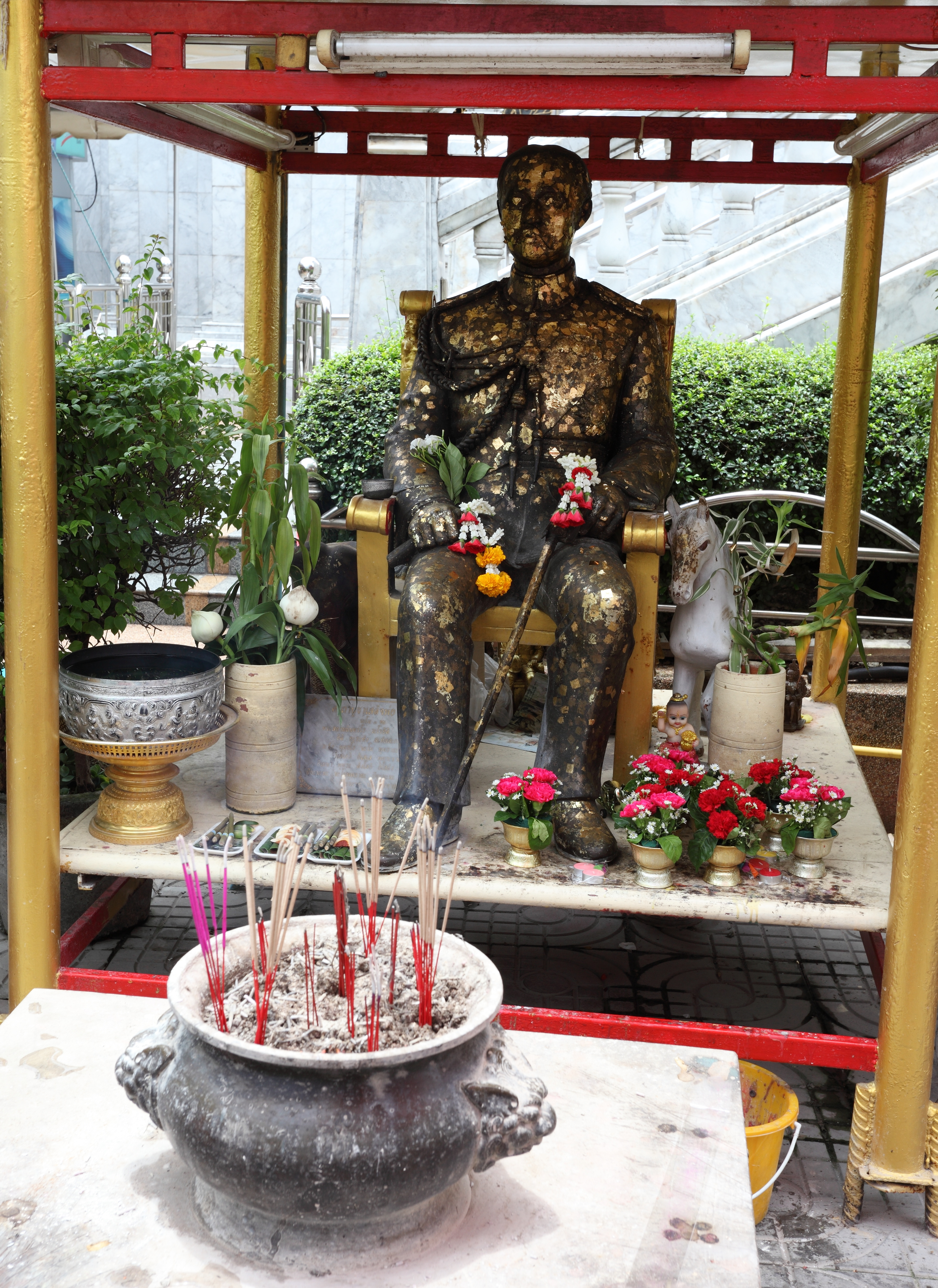
King Rama V shrine at Wat Hua Lamphong

Inside the temple compound, the ubosot and viharn are unusual in being raised on a one-story high platform, accessed by a wide staircase. The platform also supports the temple's chedi.

The compound in front of and below the ubosot platform is home to a number of shrines dedicated to important Thai Buddhist figures, including King Chulalongkorn (Rama V), and the Hindu god Ganesha.

The temple compound also contains a crematorium, and living quarters for monks.

== See also ==
- List of Buddhist temples in Thailand
