= Rama IV Road =

Road in Bangkok, Thailand

Coordinates: 13°43′50.04″N 100°32′03.1″E

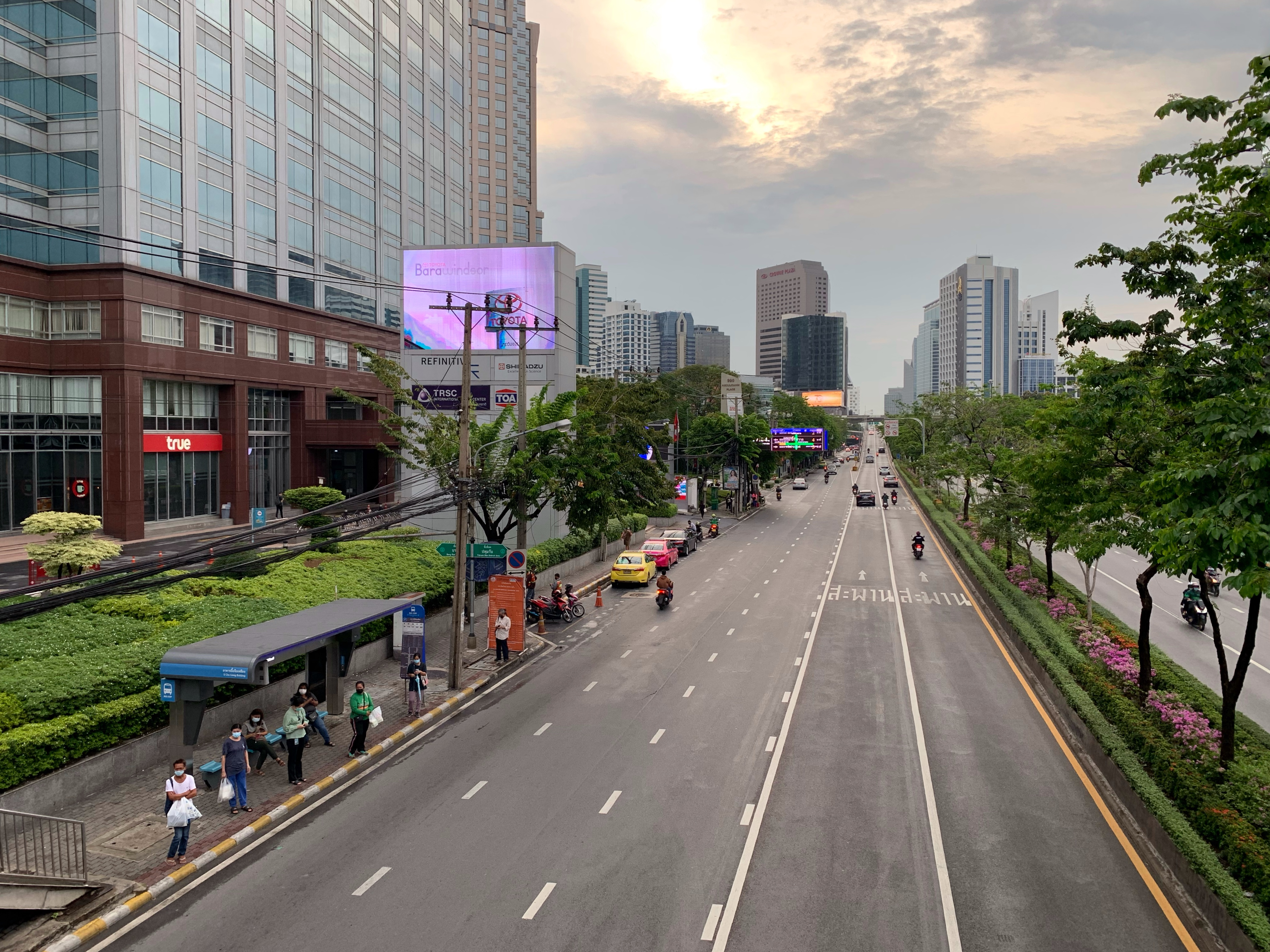
Rama IV Road by the Lumphini Park at the border of Khet Bang Rak and Khet Pathum Wan (taken from Khet Bang Rak side)

Rama IV Road (Thai: ถนนพระรามที่ 4, RTGS: Thanon Phra Ram Thi Si; usually shortened to ถนนพระราม 4, RTGS: Thanon Phra Ram Si) is a main road in Bangkok, Thailand. It starts at Mo Mi Junction in the area of Bangkok's Chinatown in Samphanthawong and Pom Prap Sattru Phai Districts and ends at the junction with Sukhumvit Road (Phra Khanong Junction) in Khlong Toei District near Bangkok Port, also known as Khlong Toei Port.

Bordering the road are the Hua Lamphong railway station, Wat Hua Lamphong, Sam Yan, Lumphini Park and Rama VI Memorial Plaza, King Chulalongkorn Memorial Hospital and Queen Saovabha Memorial Institute, One Bangkok, the Metropolitan Electricity Authority, and the headquarters of Channel 3. The MRT Blue Line snakes underneath Rama IV Road between Wat Mangkon MRT station and Queen Sirikit National Convention Centre MRT station.

== History ==
This road was built in the year 1857 during the reign of King Mongkut (Rama IV) and can be considered as the first real road in Thailand. It was built about four years before Charoen Krung Road. The road was built at the request of foreign merchants and businessmen, who complained of the difficulty and waste of time of travelling to trade in the capital. To solve this issue, they proposed to set up their stores for trading goods around Khlong Phra Khanong up to the Bang Na area and requested that the government dig up a shortcut canal from Bang Na to Khlong Phadung Krung Kasem, which was one of the outer city moats during that time.

King Mongkut ordered that a new canal be dug up in front of Phlan Phairi Rap Fort (around the Hua Lamphong area), cutting through fields to connect to Khlong Phra Khanong. At the same time, Khlong Phra Khanong was also extended to reach the Chao Phraya River. The soil dug up would be used to pave a road running along the north of the canal. The King named the new canal Khlong Thanon Trong ("straight road canal"), and it is also came to be known as Khlong Hua Lamphong. The road that ran along the bank of the canal was given various names by the community, ranging from Trong Road, Hua Lamphong Road, and Wua Lamphong Road. It was later declared in 1919, during the reign of King Vajiravudh (Rama VI), to rename Outer Hua Lamphong Road, covering the stretch between the intersections with Charoen Krung and Luang Sunthorn Kosa, to Rama IV Road in memory of King Mongkut who had initially ordered its construction.

In 1947, Khlong Hua Lamphong was drained to make way for an extension of the road. The Paknam Railway, Thailand's first railway line, followed the route of Rama IV Road from 1893 until it closed in 1960 due to under-use and increased road traffic. Several flyovers were added in the 1980s and 1990s to improve traffic flow.

== Development ==
As of 2019 the real estate bordering the road, particularly a 3.5 kilometre section stretching from Sam Yan to Klong Toey intersection, has attracted property investments totaling 185 billion baht and more investment is forecast.
