= Siam InterContinental Hotel =

Former Hotel in Bangkok, Thailand

Coordinates: 13°44′50″N 100°32′05″E

Siam Intercontinental Hotel
- 1967 postcard photo of the hotel
- Interactive map of the Siam Intercontinental Hotel area
- Hotel chain: InterContinental Hotels & Resorts

General information
- Status: Demolished
- Type: Hotel
- Location: 991 Rama I Road, Pathum Wan; Bangkok 10330, Thailand
- Opening: 1966
- Closed: June 30, 2002; 23 years ago
- Owner: Bangkok Intercontinental Hotels Company

Design and construction
- Architect: Joseph P. Salerno
- Known for: Longest operating international chain hotel in the Thailand, First hotel in 4-star hotel in Bangkok

The Siam InterContinental Hotel was a luxury hotel in Bangkok, Thailand. It stood on Rama I Road, in the neighbourhood now known as Siam in Pathum Wan District, on land leased from Sa Pathum Palace. It opened as part of Pan Am's InterContinental hotel chain in 1966, operated by the Bangkok Intercontinental Hotels Company. It stood until 2002 when it was demolished to make way for the Siam Paragon shopping mall. The Siam InterContinental was Bangkok's first luxury international-brand hotel, and was also particularly known for the striking design of its main building, by American architect Joseph P. Salerno.

== See also ==
- Erawan Hotel
- Dusit Thani Bangkok
