= Siam area =

Commercial area in Bangkok, Thailand

Coordinates: 13°44′44″N 100°32′3″E

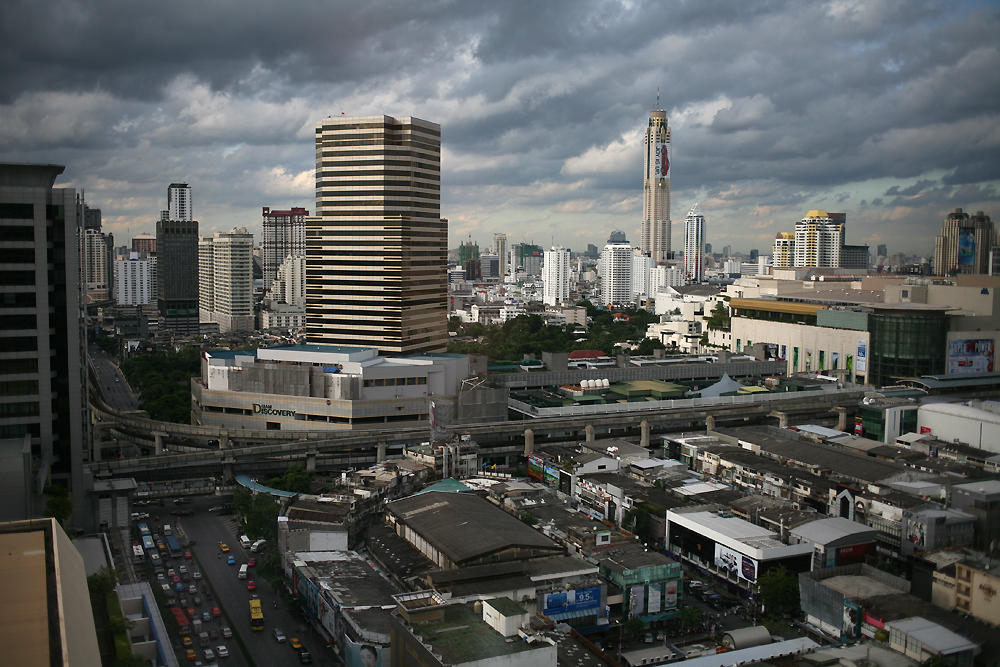
The Siam area, with the low-rise Siam Square in the lower-right corner. Beyond the tracks of the BTS Skytrain are, from left, Siam Discovery, Siam Center and Siam Paragon, and behind them, the greenery of Sa Pathum Palace.

Siam (Thai: สยาม, RTGS: Sayam, pronounced [sā.jǎːm]) is a shopping district in the heart of Bangkok, the capital of Thailand. It is situated alongside a stretch of Rama I Road in the city's Pathum Wan District, from Pathum Wan Intersection to Chaloem Phao Junction, beyond which it meets the adjacent Ratchaprasong neighbourhood. The area is home to multiple large shopping malls, and, together with Ratchaprasong, forms what has been termed the city's central shopping district, functioning as the modern-day city centre.

The area is named for Siam Square, a low-rise retail area owned and developed by Chulalongkorn University, as well as several enclosed malls opposite it which all bear Siam as part of their names: Siam Discovery, Siam Center and Siam Paragon, the last of which replaced the Siam Inter-Continental Hotel in 2002. The properties occupy land leased from the Sa Pathum Palace, which is privately owned by Prince Mahidol Adulyadej's branch of the Royal Family. Also within the neighbourhood are MBK Center and the Bangkok Art & Culture Centre on opposite corners of Pathum Wan Intersection.

The area's commercial development initially took place during the 1960s and 1970s alongside Ratchaprasong, and together they gradually supplanted the Wang Burapha area as the city's centre of urban retail and youth culture. The BTS Skytrain, which opened in 1999 with its central interchange Siam Station serving the area, helped cement the neighbourhood's prominence.

== History ==
King Mongkut (Rama IV) had built a palace and a royal temple (Wat Pathum Wanaram) near the present-day Siam area around 1855, while the land where Siam is now located was acquired by his successor King Chulalongkorn (Rama V) during the 1880s for the establishment of royal villas. The area north of Rama I Road (then known as Sa Pathum or Pathum Wan Road) was gifted to Prince Mahidol Adulyadej, and became Sa Pathum Palace. The area south of the road was intended as the estate of Crown Prince Vajirunhis's Windsor Palace, but the Prince died young and the palace was eventually given by Chulalongkorn's successor King Vajiravudh (Rama VI) for the campus of Chulalongkorn University, which was established in 1917.

The areas along the road were originally left unused by the university, until a fire in 1962 destroyed the shantytown that had come to occupy the area and the university subsequently evicted the residents. The area was then developed as a low-rise retail neighbourhood, and opened as Siam Square in 1963, around the same time as similar developments in nearby Ratchaprasong, where the air-conditioned Thai Daimaru department store famously opened in 1964. On the opposite side of Rama I Road, the Siam Inter-Continental Hotel was built on land leased from Sa Pathum Palace as part of the American airline Pan Am's international luxury hotel chain, and opened in 1966. It was operated by the Bangkok Intercontinental Hotels Company (BIHC), who would also build the Siam Center shopping centre, which opened in 1973. Mahboonkrong (later to become known as MBK Center) opened on a nearby plot of university land in 1985, the same year as World Trade Center (now Centralworld) in Ratchaprasong, and the two brought formidable competition to the scene. BIHC opened its second mall, Siam Discovery, in 1997 amidst that year's financial crisis and construction of the BTS Skytrain.

By the 1990s, the neighbourhood, and Siam Square in particular, had become known as the city's main lifestyle destination for urban youth, taking over the role previously held by the Wang Burapha area in the 1950s–1960s. The opening of the BTS in 1999, with its central interchange at Siam Station, further cemented the prominence of the area, which, together with Ratchaprasong, has been observed to function as a central shopping district, marking the modern-day city centre. The Siam Inter-Continental closed down in 2002, and was replaced by Siam Paragon, the neighbourhood's largest mall, which opened in 2005. The Bangkok Art & Culture Centre opened in 2008.

The area's central location led it to be occupied by Red-Shirt protesters in 2010, which ended in a violent military crackdown. Subsequent protest groups have also rallied in the area.

== Description ==
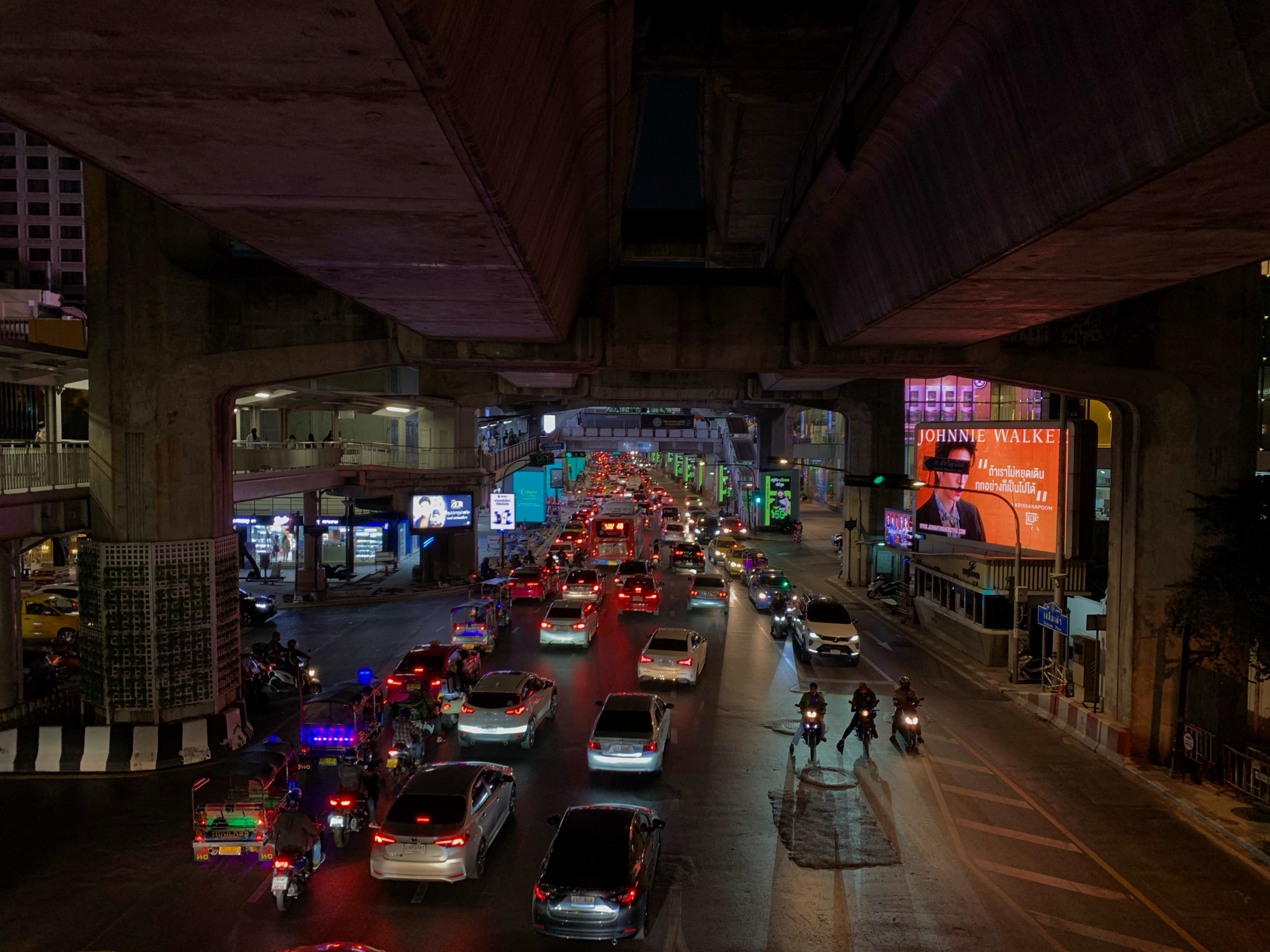
Chaloem Phao Junction

The Siam area lies along Rama I Road, from the corners surrounding Pathum Wan Intersection, where Rama I crosses Phaya Thai Road, to Chaloem Phao Junction, where it meets Henri Dunant Road. Siam Square occupies the entire block between the junctions on the road's south side, while Siam Discovery, Siam Center and Siam Paragon occupy the north side from west to east. The Bangkok Art & Culture Centre sits on the northwest corner of Pathum Wan Intersection, while MBK Center occupies the southwest corner, on Chulalongkorn University land. Beyond MBK to the west is the National Stadium complex, while east of Chaloem Phao, Wat Pathum Wanaram (on the road's north side) separates the string of malls from those of Ratchaprasong; the head quarters of the Royal Thai Police is opposite it on the south side.
