= Rama I Road =

Street in Bangkok, Thailand

Coordinates: 13°44′56.5″N 100°31′0.5″E

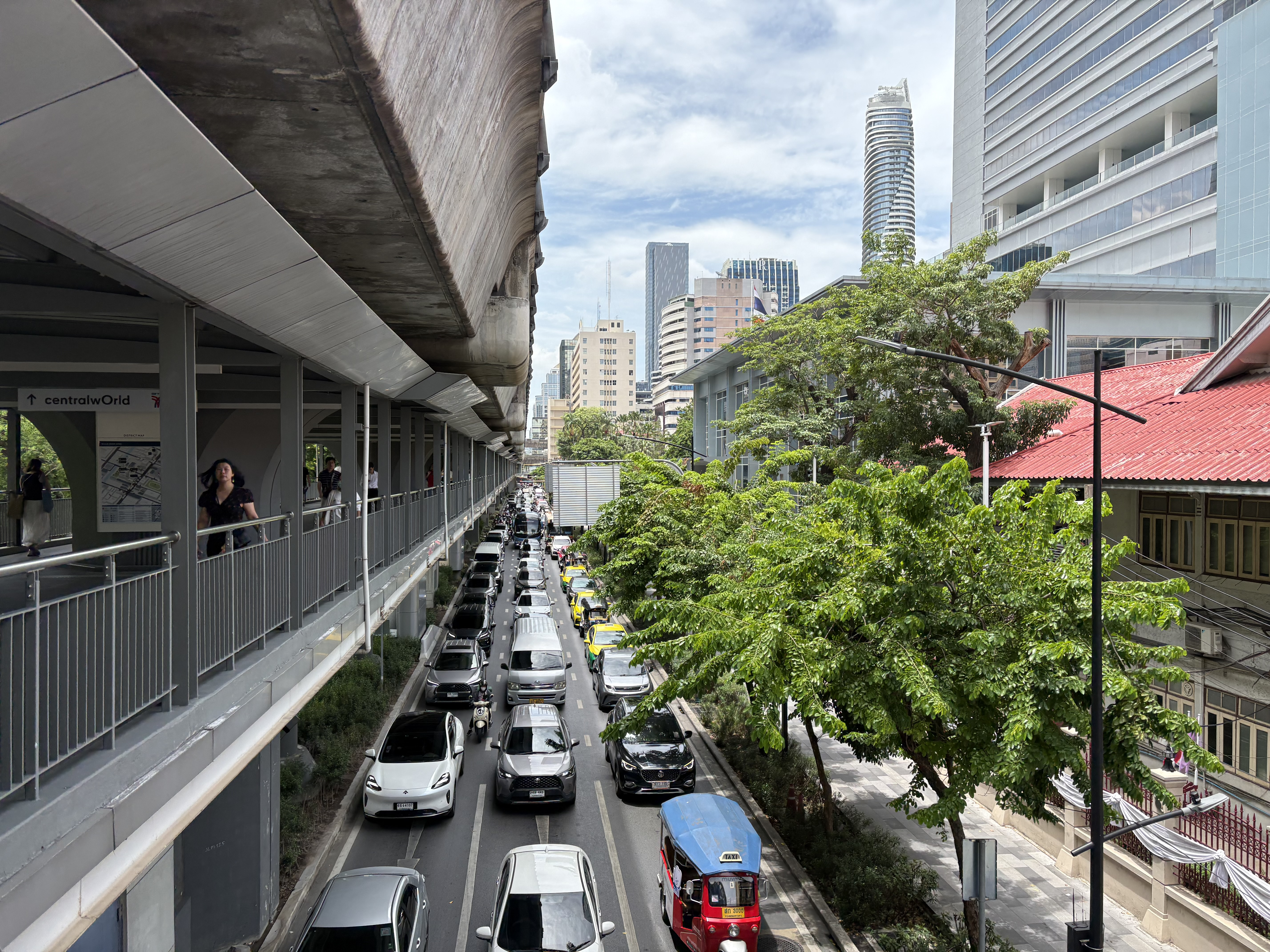
Rama I Road in front of the Royal Thai Police Headquarters

Rama I Road (Thai: ถนนพระรามที่ 1, RTGS: Thanon Phra Ram Thi Nueng; usually shortened to ถนนพระราม 1, RTGS: Thanon Phra Ram Nueng) is a road in Bangkok. It starts from the end of Bamrung Mueang Road where it intersects Krung Kasem Road at the border between the districts of Pom Prap Sattru Phai and Pathum Wan. From this point, it crosses Kasat Suek Bridge, also known as Yotse Bridge, which runs above Khlong Phadung Krung Kasem and the railway running from nearby Hua Lamphong railway station. Continuing east, it ends at Ratchaprasong intersection, a four-way intersection of Ratchadamri Road, Rama I Road and Phloen Chit Road. The total distance is 2.8 kilometres (1.7 mi).

Rama I Road runs through the shopping district Siam, with many department stores being situated on the road such as MBK Center, Siam Discovery, Siam Paragon, and Siam Square. Other landmarks on the road include the Jim Thompson House, the Bangkok Art and Culture Centre, the Scala Cinema, and the Buddhist temple Wat Pathum Wanaram.

== History ==
Originally, it was named Pathum Wan Road after Pathum Wan District. Late, King Vajiravudh renamed the road "Rama I" to commemorate the King Phutthayotfa Chulalok, also known as Rama I, who was the founder of the Rattanakosin Kingdom (now Thailand) and the first monarch of the reigning Chakri dynasty. The renaming alludes to a popular belief that Rama I, who at that time was serving as a general of King Taksin, had used the road to enter the inner city after returning from a war.
