= Queen Savang Vadhana Museum =

- พิพิธภัณฑ์พระพันวัสสาอัยยิกาเจ้า
- Established: 17 December 2008
- Location: วังสระปทุม, 195 Phaya Thai Rd, Khwaeng Pathum Wan, Pathum Wan, Bangkok, Thailand
- Coordinates: 13.747937°N 100.533812°E
- Type: History museum
- Owner: House of Mahidol
- Website: http://www.queensavang.org/queensavang/

The Queen Savang Vadhana Museum (Thai: พิพิธภัณฑ์พระพันวัสสาอัยยิกาเจ้า) is a Thai cultural museum exhibiting the royal duties of Queen Savang Vadhana, the consort of King Rama V. It was established in 2008 in the queen's former mansion within the Sa Pathum Palace in Bangkok.

== History ==
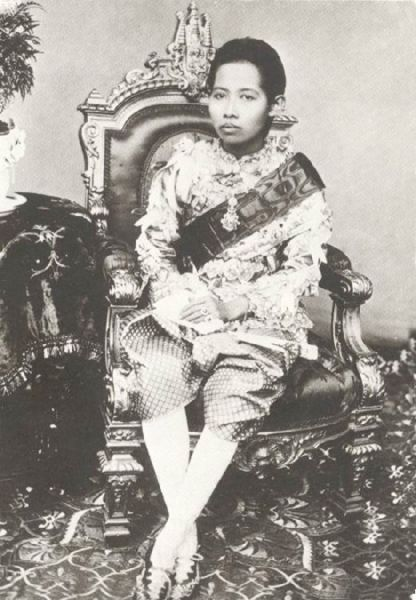
Queen Savang Vadhana

The Queen Savang Vadhana Museum is housed at the Phra Tamnak Yai, a mansion which previously belonged to its namesake queen. The mansion served as her primary residence from 1916 until her death in 1955. The Phra Tamnak Yai was completed between 1914 and 1915. Its interiors were personally planned by the queen, who focused on flow of the wind directions of each season. After her demise, it was later passed down to her daughter-in-law, Srinagarindra, before being inherited by the daughter of King Rama IX, Maha Chakri Sirindhorn upon the former's death.

On 27 October 2005, Queen Savang Vadhana Foundation was established by Princess Sirindhorn to document and act as a resource centre detailing the life and royal activities of the late queen, who during the reign of King Rama V was known for her exhibitions of Siamese art and culture. As part of the celebrations of the King Rama IX's 80th Birthday Anniversary on 5 December 2007, the King, in his speech, requested the mansion to be used to display the activities of Queen Savang Vadhana as representation of people during her time. This announcement was followed by the opening of the museum on 17 December 2008 by Princess Sirindhorn at the Phra Tamnak Yai.

The mansion, and therefore the museum, is access-restricted; it is located in the compound of the Sa Pathum Palace, which presently serves as the royal residence of Princess Sirindhorn, and is only open seasonally to the public through special appointment.

== Exhibit ==
The museum houses a main exhibition and the Phra Tamnak Yai exhibition, separated into two and three parts, respectively. The former exhibit details the history of the building as well as the queen's life. The latter exhibits collections separated into three time periods corresponding to the lifetime of her son, Prince Mahidol.

The second floor of the mansion features a bedroom which leads out to the balcony where the queen presided over the royal wedding ceremony of her grandson, Rama IX.
