= Pathum Wan Subdistrict =

Pathum Wan ปทุมวัน
- Khwaeng
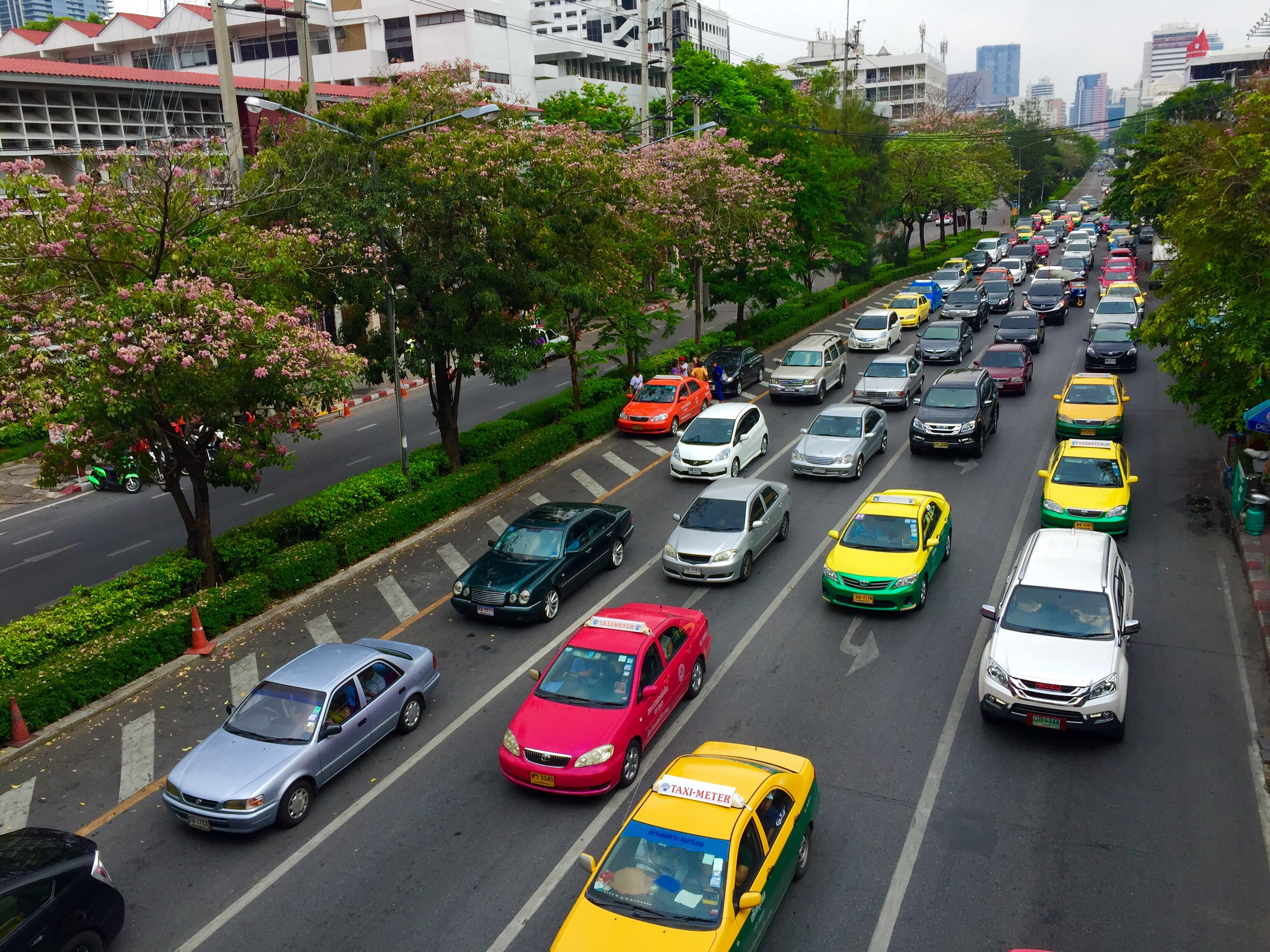
- Phayathai Road in Pathum Wan Subdistrict

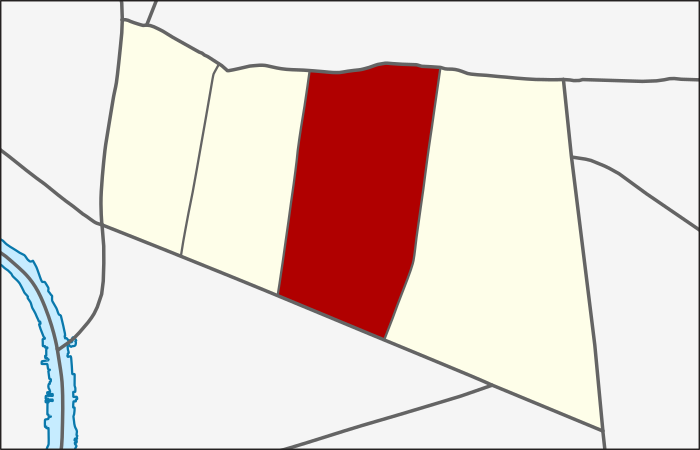
- Location in Pathum Wan district
- Country: Thailand
- Province: Bangkok
- Khet: Pathum Wan

Area
  - Total: 8.37 km^{2} (3.23 sq mi)

Population (2019)
  - Total: 5,384
- Time zone: UTC+7 (ICT)
- Postal code: 10330
- TIS 1099: 100703

Pathum Wan (Thai: ปทุมวัน, pronounced [pa.tʰum wan]) is a khwaeng (subdistrict) of Pathum Wan District, in Bangkok. In 2019, it had a population of 5,384.
