= Pathumwananurak Park =

Public park in Bangkok, Thailand

Coordinates: 13°44′56″N 100°32′21″E

- สวนปทุมวนานุรักษ์
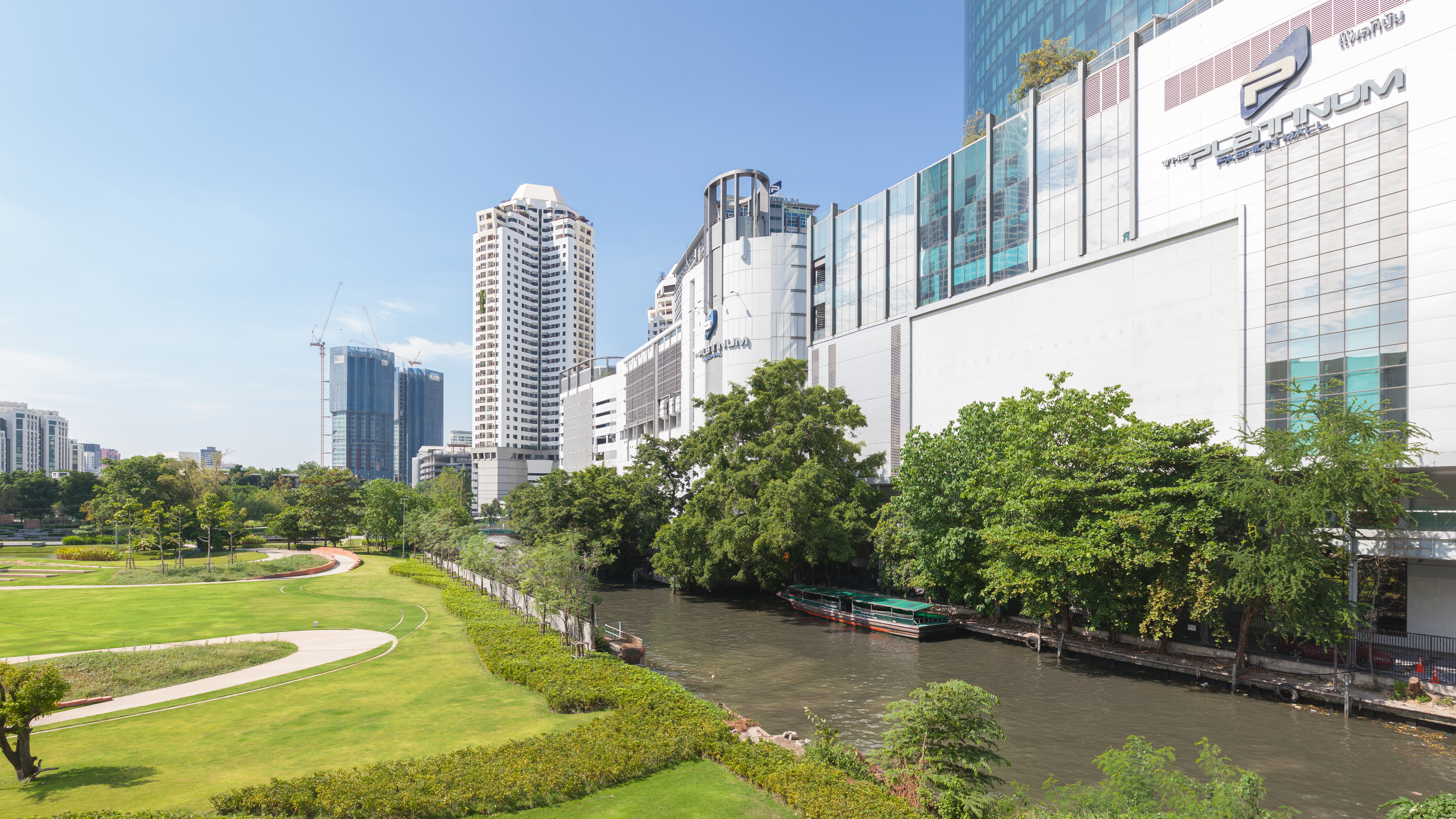
- Type: Urban park
- Location: Pathum Wan, Bangkok, Thailand
- Area: 40-rai (6.4 ha; 16-acre)
- Opening: 2023

Pathumwananurak Park (Thai: สวนปทุมวนานุรักษ์) is a park in Bangkok, Thailand.

Completed in December 2018 for the Crown Property Bureau by landscape architecture firm Landprocess, the park was unable to open to the public due to two residential houses remaining on the property. The park is adjacent to CentralWorld shopping mall and Saen Saep Canal. The houses were demolished in January 2023.
