= Pathum Wan district =

Pathum Wan ปทุมวัน
- District (khet)
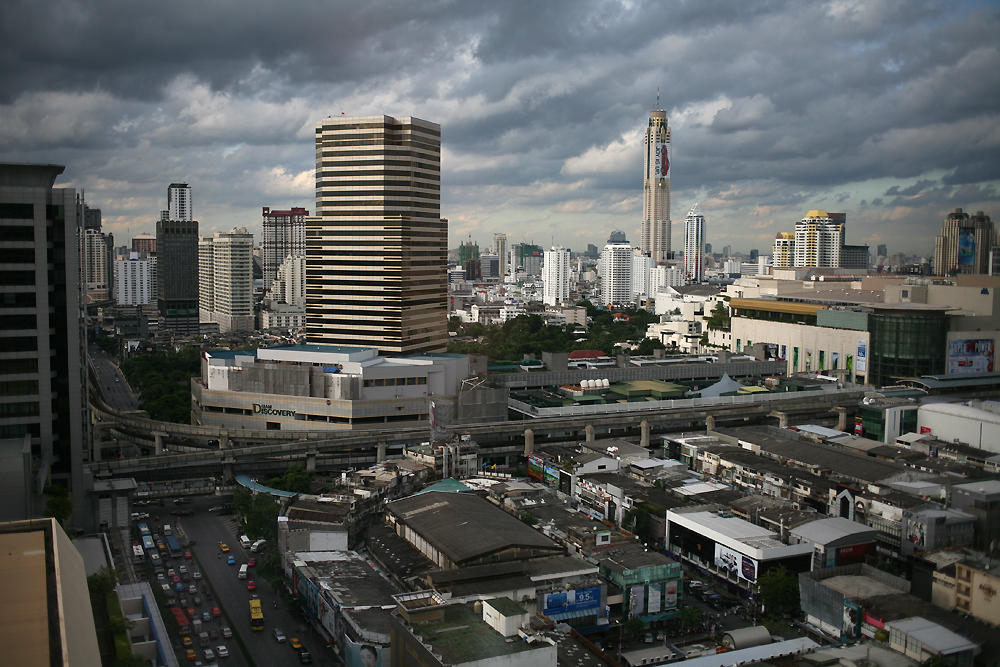
- The Siam area, with Siam Square in the foreground

- Location in Bangkok
- Coordinates (district office): 13°44′42″N 100°31′20″E
- Country: Thailand
- Province: Bangkok
- Seat: Rong Mueang
- Khwaeng: 4
- Established: 1915

Area
  - Total: 8.37 km^{2} (3.23 sq mi)

Population (2019)
  - Total: 47,685
  - Density: 5,700/km^{2} (14,800/sq mi)
- Postal code: 10330
- Geocode: 1007

Pathum Wan (Thai: ปทุมวัน, pronounced [pā.tʰūm.wān]) is one of the fifty districts (khet) of Bangkok, Thailand. It lies just beyond the old city boundary of Khlong Phadung Krung Kasem and was a rural area on the eastern outskirts of the city when royal villas were built there in the late nineteenth century. The district was officially established in 1915, and covers an area of 8.37 square kilometres (3.23 sq mi). A large part of the district area is taken up by the campus of Chulalongkorn University and the green expanses of Lumphini Park and the Royal Bangkok Sports Club. By the turn of the 20th–21st centuries, the district had become known as the modern-day city centre, home to the prominent shopping areas of Siam and Ratchaprasong.

== History ==
When King Rama I established Bangkok as his capital in 1782, he had canals dug including Khlong Maha Nak, which extended eastward from the fortified city proper of Rattanakosin Island. Communities formed along its bank, including Ban Khrua, a Muslim community mainly of Cham settlers, which stood at the end of the canal. As the canal was extended further eastward and became known as Khlong Bang Kapi (later Khlong Saen Saep), the outlying areas were cleared for paddy fields, though apart from the canal's banks the areas remained sparsely populated.

=== Urban development ===
By the reign of King Mongkut (Rama IV, 1851–1868), the city had spread beyond its original walls, and Khlong Phadung Krung Kasem was dug to extend the city's periphery in 1852. The eastern fringe of the city was then dominated by expansive rice fields, with Thung Bang Kapi occupying the areas along Bang Kapi Canal. The area that is now Pathum Wan was occupied by royal paddy fields by the canal, between Khlong Phadung Krung Kasem and Ban Khrua to the west and the Bang Kapi fields to the east. Some Lao war captives had also been settled in the area following the razing of Vientiane in 1827.

Sometime before 1855, Mongkut had part of the royal fields south of the canal landscaped with ponds and waterways, which were planted with decorative lotuses, for leisurely visits. A royal villa was built there, which was named Pathum Wan, meaning "lotus forest" (from Pali paduma + vana). A temple, named Wat Pathumwanaram, was also built next to the palace. The King made annual visits to the palace and the temple, at first travelling by boat. A road was later built, continuing eastward from Bamrung Mueang Road, linking the palace to the city. It was originally known as Sa Pathum or Pathum Wan Road before being renamed Rama I Road in 1920.

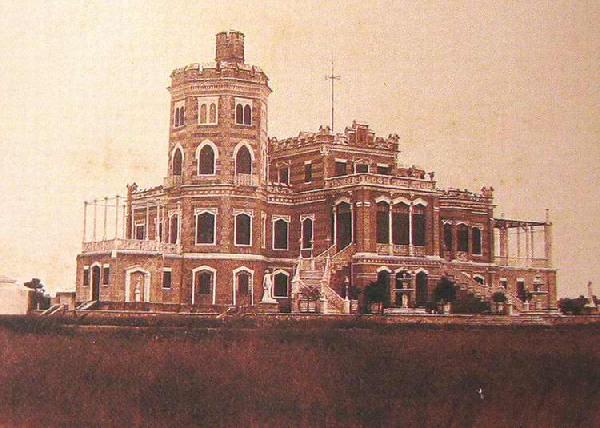
Windsor Palace, which stood from 1884 to 1935, occupied extensive grounds in what is now Wang Mai Subdistrict.

With the royal development, the area began to attract more residents, and more palaces were built during the following reign of King Chulalongkorn (Rama V, 1868–1910). The King had a palace built for Prince Svasti Sobhana west of Pathum Wan Palace in 1880, and commissioned Windsor Palace in 1881 for his own son Prince Vajirunhis, buying up large amounts of land for what was to be its extensive grounds. He also later gifted a plot of land to another son, Prince Mahidol Adulyadej, though it was Mahidol's mother Queen Savang Vadhana who oversaw the construction Sa Pathum Palace there after Chulalongkorn died in 1910.

Windsor Palace had become vacant following Vajirunhis's death in 1895, and its grounds became the site of several successive educational institutions which became established as Chulalongkorn University in 1917 by King Vajiravudh (Rama VI, r. 1910–1925). By then, several canals, roads and railways had been built through the area. West of the university grounds the Bangkok Railway Station, the country's main terminus, had been built in 1916. To the east, the Phloen Chit area was developed by the enterprising businessman Nai Lert around the same time. When the administration of Bangkok's districts was reorganized in 1915, the district was established as Amphoe Pathum Wan, bounded by Khlong Saen Saep to the north, the Chong Nonsi Railway to the east, Khlong Hua Lamphong to the south, and Khlong Phadung Krung Kasem to the west. Its status, along with Bangkok's other districts', was later changed from amphoe to khet in 1972.

=== 20th century ===
Pathum Wan District saw increasing development throughout the 20th century, especially since the 1970s when the area along Rama I and Phloenchit roads became developed as a major shopping and commercial district. The Erawan Hotel opened on Ratchaprasong Intersection in 1956, and the Thai Daimaru department store, famous for introducing air conditioning and the escalator, opened on the opposite corner in 1964. Siam Square was developed as a low-rise retail area by Chulalongkorn University the same year, and the Siam Inter-Continental Hotel opened opposite it in 1966. Rajadamri Arcade—a modern, enclosed shopping mall—opened at Ratchaprasong in 1972, and Siam Center (next to the Inter-Continental) followed the next year. Gradually, Siam and Ratchaprasong supplanted the Wang Burapha area as Bangkok's centre of urban retail and youth culture. With the opening of the BTS Skytrain in 1999, the location of its central interchange at Siam station helped cement the neighbourhood's prominence as Bangkok's modern-day city centre. The area's prominence led to its occupation by anti-government protesters in 2010, which ended in a violent military crackdown.

The legal case about demolishing a high-rise on Soi Ruamrudee, was finally decided in 2025 by the Supreme Administrative Court; "The ruling means that no more legal barriers to demolition remain", according to media. The high-rise was built in 2005, without proper authority.

== Geography and administration ==
Pathum Wan District occupies 8.369 square kilometres (3.231 sq mi) in Bangkok's Phra Nakhon side (east of the Chao Phraya River). It is bordered by Dusit and Ratchathewi districts to the north across Khlong Saen Saep, Watthana and Khlong Toei to the east across the Maenam railway, Sathon and Bang Rak to the south across Rama IV Road, and Pom Prap Sattru Phai and Samphanthawong to the west across Khlong Phadung Krung Kasem.

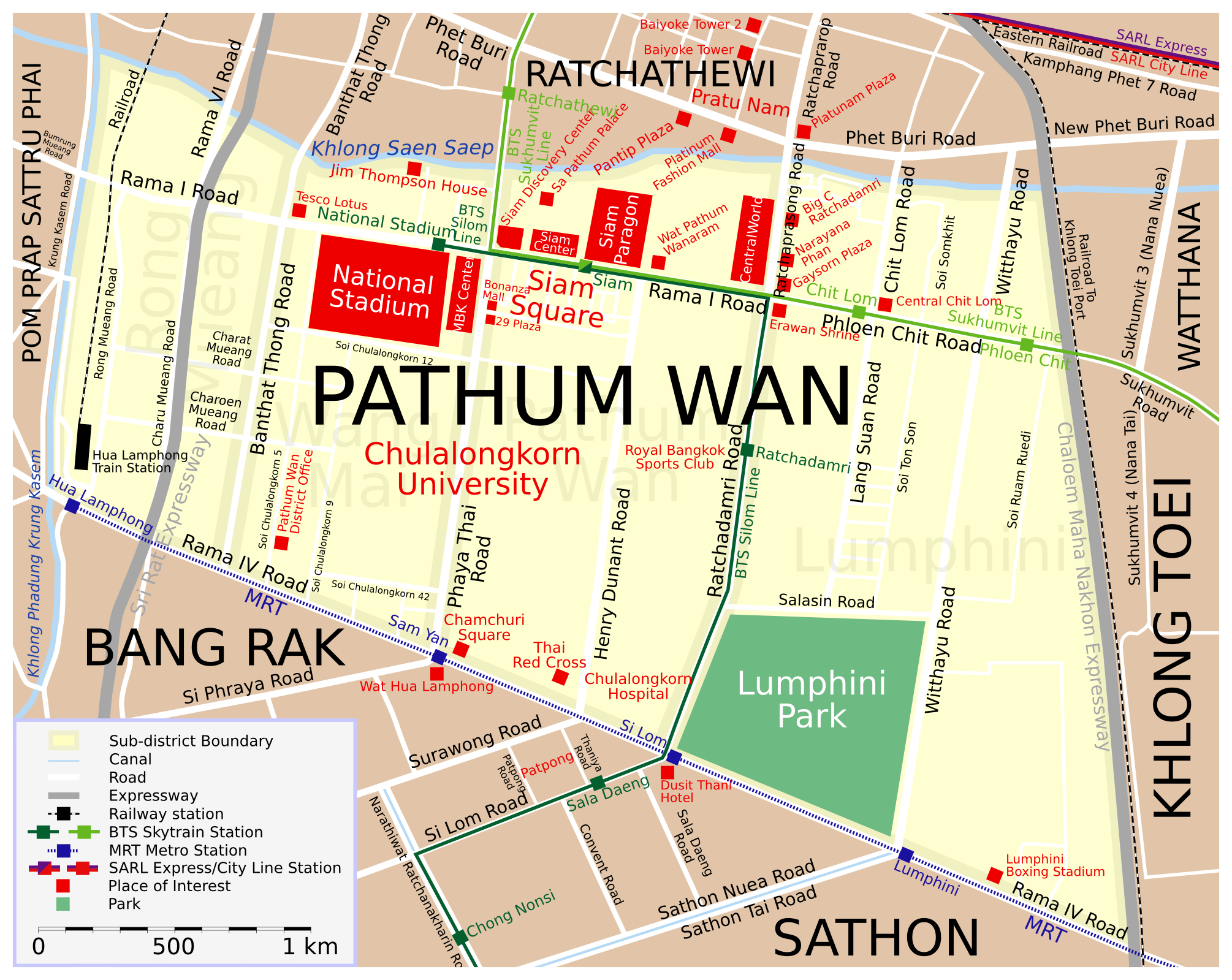
District map

The district is served by two major thoroughfares running roughly west–east: Rama I–Phloen Chit near Saen Saep Canal and Rama IV Road along the district's southern edge. They are crossed by several roads running north–south: Rama VI–Charu Mueang, Banthat Thong, Phaya Thai, Henri Dunant, Ratchadamri, Chit Lom–Lang Suan, and Witthayu. The Si Rat and Chaloem Maha Nakhon expressways run above Phra Ram VI–Charu Mueang and alongside the Maenam railway, respectively.

Banthat Thong, Phaya Thai and Ratchadamri roads divide the district into four subdistricts (khwaeng). They are, from east to west: Rong Mueang, Wang Mai, Pathum Wan and Lumphini. Together, they have a registered population of 47,685 as of October 2019.

	Name		Area (km^{2})	Population (2019)
1.	Rong Mueang	รองเมือง	1.423	16,827
2.	Wang Mai	วังใหม่	1.423	6,877
3.	Pathum Wan	ปทุมวัน	2.276	6,022
4.	Lumphini	ลุมพินี	3.247	17,959

=== Neighbourhoods ===
Rong Mueang remains the district's least developed area, occupied mostly by low-rise residential neighbourhoods. Rama VI Road crosses Rama I at Phong Phraram Intersection, and becomes known as Charu Mueang Road towards Rama IV to the south. The subdistrict's most prominent landmark is the Bangkok Railway Station (commonly known as Hua Lamphong), which lies in its southwestern corner at Hua Lamphong Intersection; the railway yard occupies most of the area along Phadung Krung Kasem Canal.

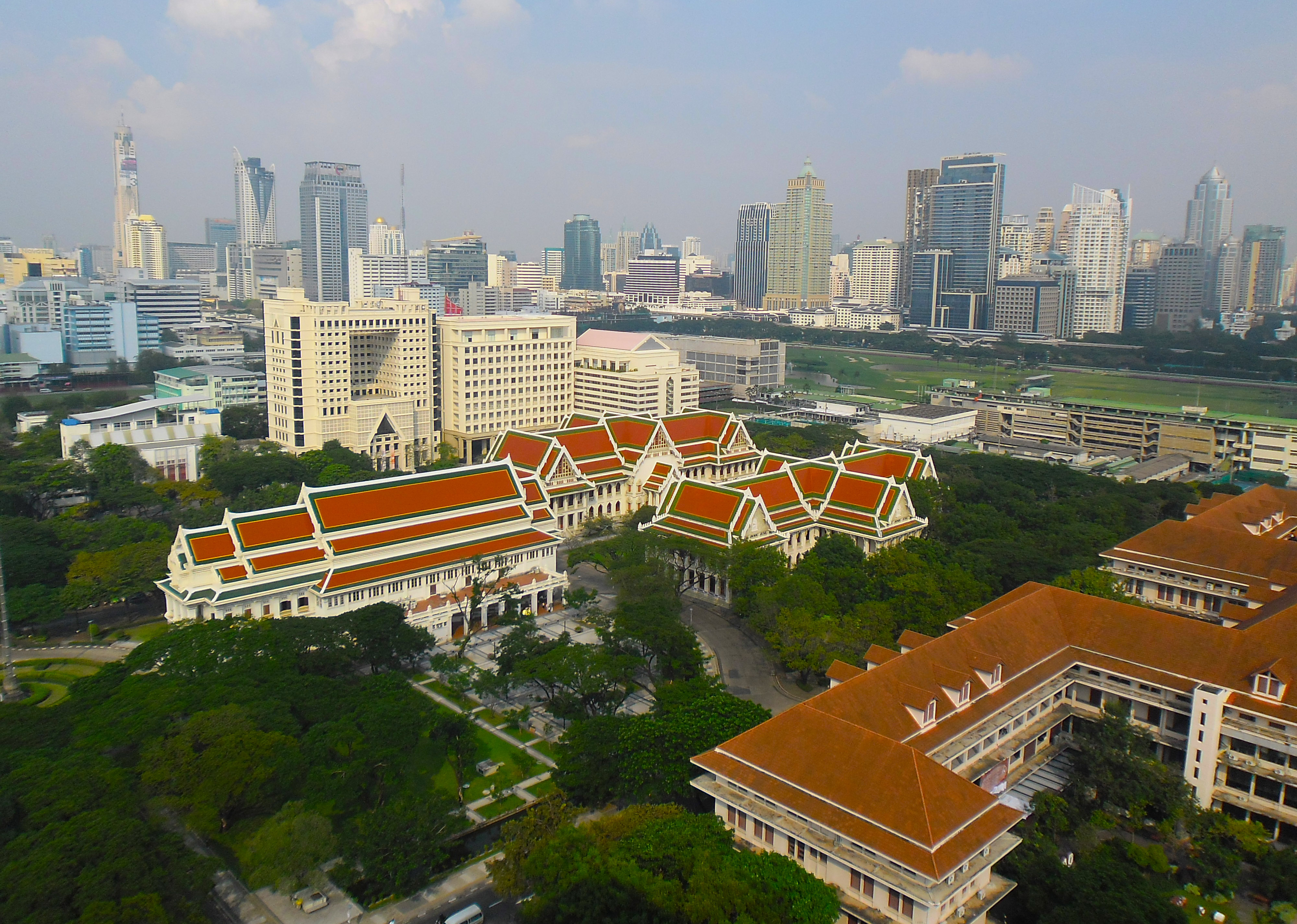
The campus of Chulalongkorn University and the Royal Bangkok Sports Club form open spaces against the backdrop of Ratchadamri skyscrapers (background, right).

The area of Wang Mai and Pathum Wan subdistricts (the former is known after another name of Windsor Palace) is dominated by the campus of Chulalongkorn University, which owns most of the land between Banthat Thong, Rama I, Henri Dunant and Rama IV roads. The neighbourhoods of Suan Luang (the east side of Banthat Thong) and Sam Yan (on the intersection of the same name where Phaya Thai Road meets Rama IV) are managed and developed for revenue by the university's Property Management Office.

Along Rama I Road, Charoen Phon Intersection (where it crosses Banthat Thong) is marked by the nearby National Stadium, which stands on the former location of Windsor Palace. Opposite the stadium complex to the north still lies part of the historic Ban Khrua community (though the main settlement is across Saen Sap Canal in Ratchathewi District). East of the stadium complex, the length of Rama I Road from Pathum Wan Intersection (where the road crosses Phaya Thai Road) to Chaloem Phao (where it meets Henri Dunant) serves the major shopping area known as Siam, after the retail area of Siam Square and several shopping centres opposite it. Further east, past Wat Pathumwanaram, the chain of shopping malls continues through the Ratchaprasong area (the intersection where Rama I is crossed by Ratchadamri Road) and along Phloen Chit Road (which continues off from Rama I). The coterminous areas of Siam and Ratchaprasong have been observed to form a "central shopping district" marking the city centre, as opposed to the central business district concept usually found elsewhere.

The area of Lumphini Subdistrict south of the shopping area consists mainly of luxury residential towers and hotels along Ratchadamri, Lang Suan and Witthayu Roads, as well as numerous embassies. The subdistrict's main feature, giving it its name, is Lumphini Park, which sits between Ratchadamri and Witthayu roads and fronts Rama IV from Sala Daeng to Witthayu intersections. Lower-income neighbourhoods form the residential communities of Polo (off Witthayu Road, opposite the park) and Bon Kai (on Rama IV Road, in the district's southeast corner).

== Notable locations ==
=== Shopping ===
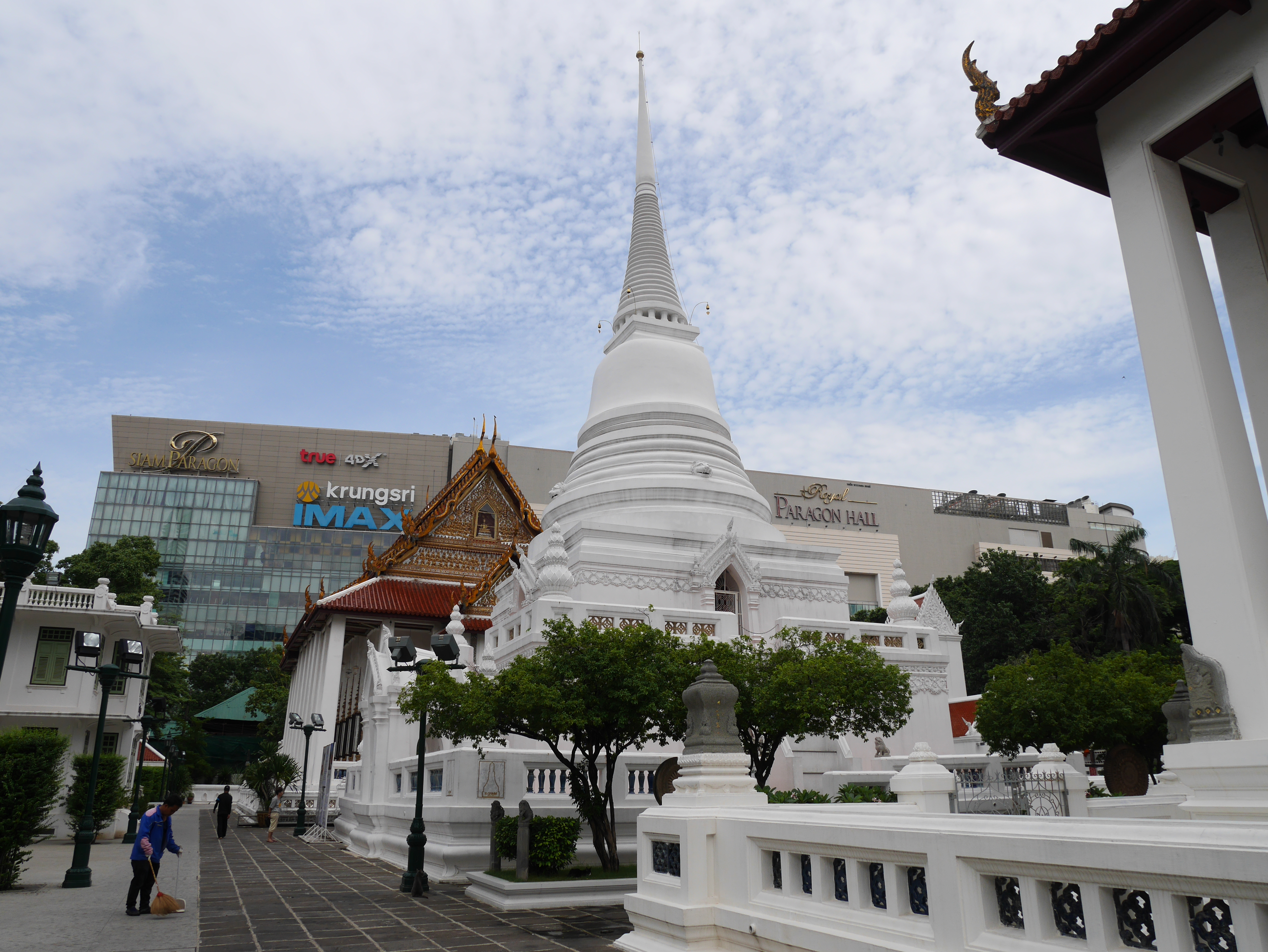
Wat Pathum Wanaram forms an oasis of tranquillity flanked by the Siam Paragon (in back) and CentralWorld (not shown) shopping malls.

Pathum Wan is best known for the shopping district of Siam and Ratchaprasong. Siam Square is a low-rise area consisting of many small blocks of shops and buildings, sitting opposite the enclosed malls MBK Center on one side, and Siam Discovery, Siam Center and Siam Paragon (the last of which stands on the former site of the Siam Inter-Continental) on the other. The Ratchaprasong intersection is lined by the CentralWorld, BigC Ratchadamri (on the former site of Rajadamri Arcade), Narayana Phan, and Gaysorn shopping malls, as well as Central Chidlom, the Central Group's flagship department store.

=== Culture ===
On the opposite corner of Pathum Wan Intersection from Siam Square is the Bangkok Art and Culture Centre, which shares the contemporary art scene with several galleries operated by Chulalongkorn University. The Jim Thompson House museum is popular as a tourist attraction. It is a complex of traditional Thai houses near the Ban Khrua community from where the designer sourced the silk he popularized internationally.

The Erawan Shrine stands on a corner of Ratchaprasong, in front of the Grand Hyatt Erawan hotel (which replaced the Erawan in 1991). It is a famous place of worship where locals and tourists come to make wishes, but also the site of Bangkok's deadliest terrorist attack in 2015. Formal religious sites in the district include Wat Pathumwanaram, Wat Borom Niwat, Wat Duang Khae, Wat Chamni Hatthakan, Wat Sa Bua, Wat Chai Mongkhon, Masjid Indonesia, and the Holy Redeemer Church.

=== Institutions ===
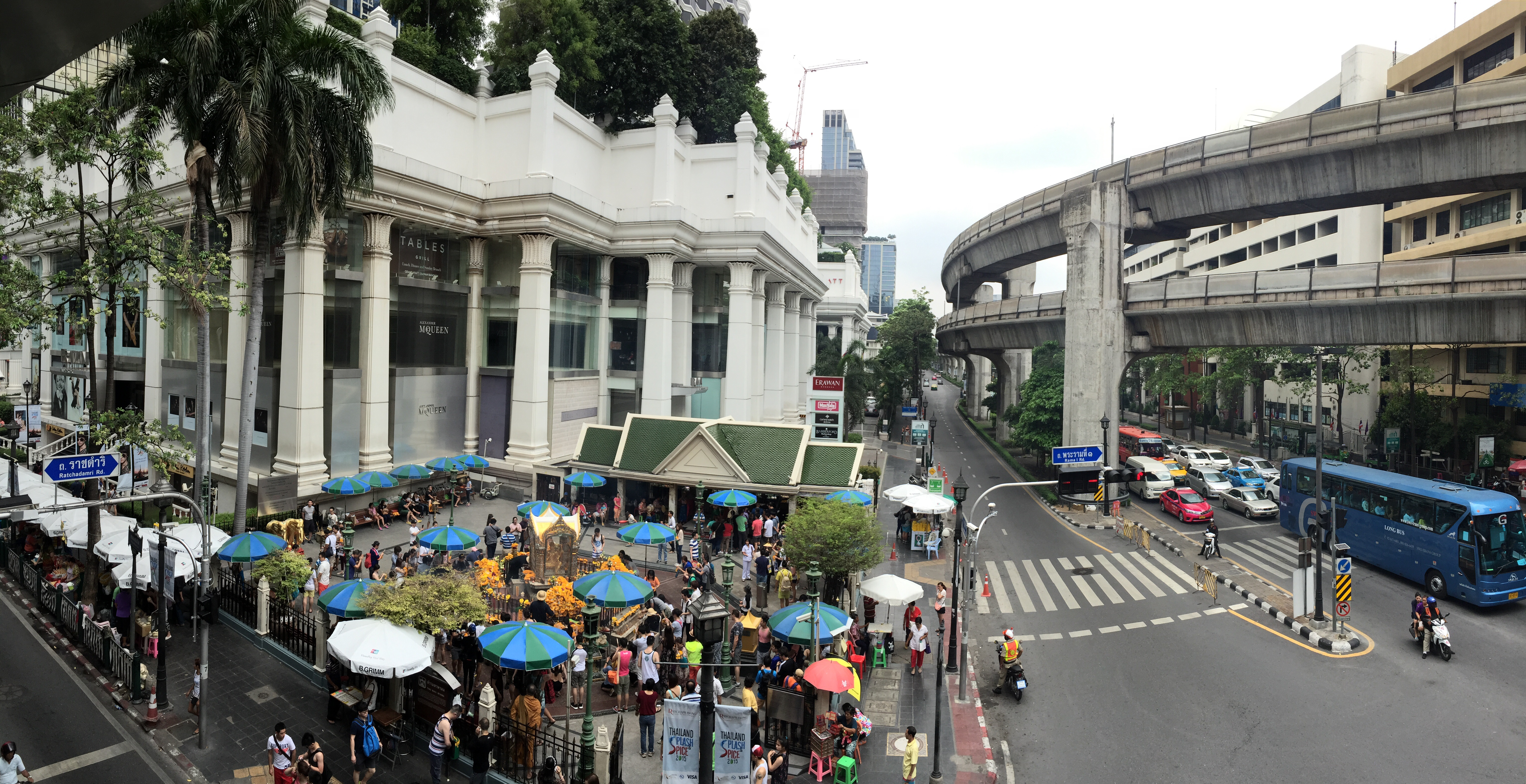
The Erawan Shrine at Ratchaprasong Intersection

Much of the district's area is occupied by public institutions, most notably Chulalongkorn University, whose campus occupies several large blocks, mainly between Phaya Thai Road (which bisects it) and Henri Dunant Road. The latter is named after the founder of the Red Cross, as the Thai Red Cross Society straddles its southern end, with the Queen Saovabha Memorial Institute (famous for its snake farm) on one side and King Chulalongkorn Memorial Hospital (one of the country's largest teaching hospitals, affiliated with the university) on the other. Another major public hospital, Police General Hospital, is within the Royal Thai Police headquarters between Chaloem Phao and Ratchaprasong intersections. The offices of the State Railway of Thailand (next to the Bangkok Railway Station) and the Ministry of Energy sit beside Khlong Phadung Krung Kasem in Rong Mueang. Other educational institutions include the rival technical colleges Pathumwan Institute of Technology (on the former site of Prince Svasti Sobhana's palace) and the Uthenthawai campus of Rajamangala University of Technology Tawan-ok, and schools Triam Udom Suksa School, Chulalongkorn University Demonstration School, the Patumwan Demonstration School of Srinakharinwirot University, and Mater Dei School (the last of which is the only private institution).

=== Sports ===
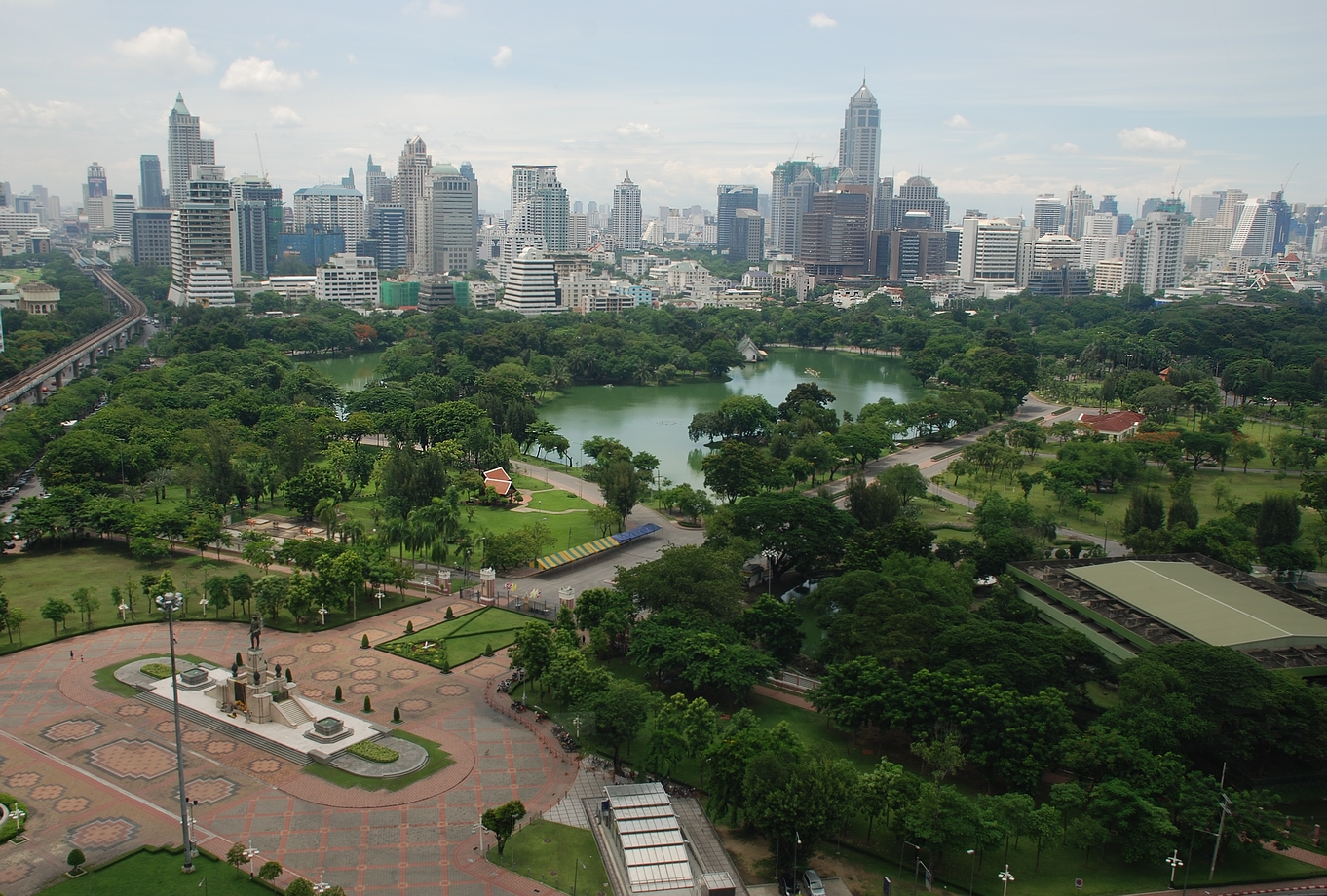
Lumphini Park

Sports venues also form distinctive features in the district. In addition to the public National Stadium, the exclusive Royal Bangkok Sports Club (RBSC), with its golf course, forms a large green area between the two hospitals and gave Henri Dunant Road its former name: Thanon Sanam Ma or Racecourse Road. It has a second branch at the RBSC Polo Club off Witthayu Road. The Lumpinee Boxing Stadium used to stand on Rama IV Road near Witthayu Intersection, but was relocated in 2014. Sporting activities also take place in Lumphini Park—one of the largest parks in the city—and its various facilities. Newer parks built in the 2010s include Chulalongkorn University Centenary Park on Banthat Thong and Pathumwananurak Park near Ratchaprasong. The latter was developed by the Crown Property Bureau, which, like the university, owns a lot of land in the area, especially in Lumphini Subdistrict. Other green spaces include the compound of Sa Pathum Palace—the area's only remaining royal residence—and the embassies of the United States and the Netherlands, two of the many diplomatic missions lining Witthayu Road or occupying office towers in the area.

== Festivals ==
Every year around Christmas and New Year, shopping centres, hotels and sidewalks in the Ratchaprasong shopping district are decorated with lights. It was started by The Peninsular Plaza (closed since 1 March 2022) and the Regent Hotel, and later expanded to Sogo (now out of business), Amarin Plaza, CentralWorld, Central Chidlom, Gaysorn and more. The Bangkok Metropolitan Administration (BMA) provides lights along the BTS Skytrain pillars.

== Transportation ==
Pathum Wan is served by multiple public transport systems. Both lines of the BTS Skytrain and the Blue Line of the MRT serve the district's neighbourhoods, while the Khlong Saen Saep water bus stops at multiple piers along its northern edge. Multiple bus lines run on the major streets, while both expressways have entrances and exits on Rama IV Road.

The Siam Station serves as the main interchange between the BTS's Sukhumvit and Silom lines. The other stations are Chit Lom and Phloen Chit on the Sukhumvit Line, and National Stadium and Ratchadamri on the Silom Line. The MRT runs beneath Rama IV Road along the district's southern edge, with Hua Lamphong, Sam Yan, Si Lom, and Lumphini stations serving their respective neighbourhoods.

Prior to the opening of Krung Thep Aphiwat Central Terminal, the current central station in Chatuchak district of Bangkok, Hua Lamphong railway station was the central station of Bangkok.

== Gallery ==
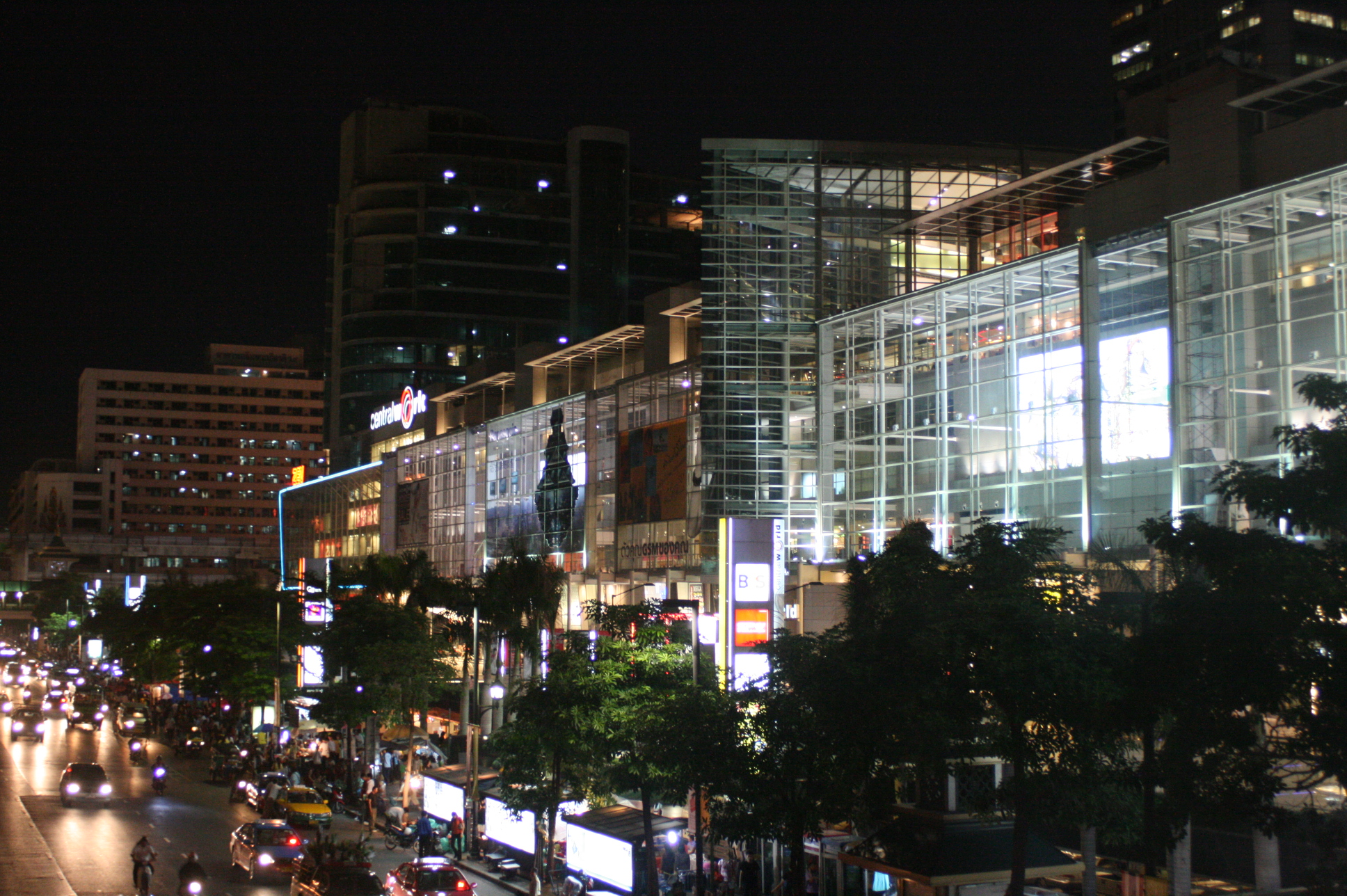
CentralWorld at night

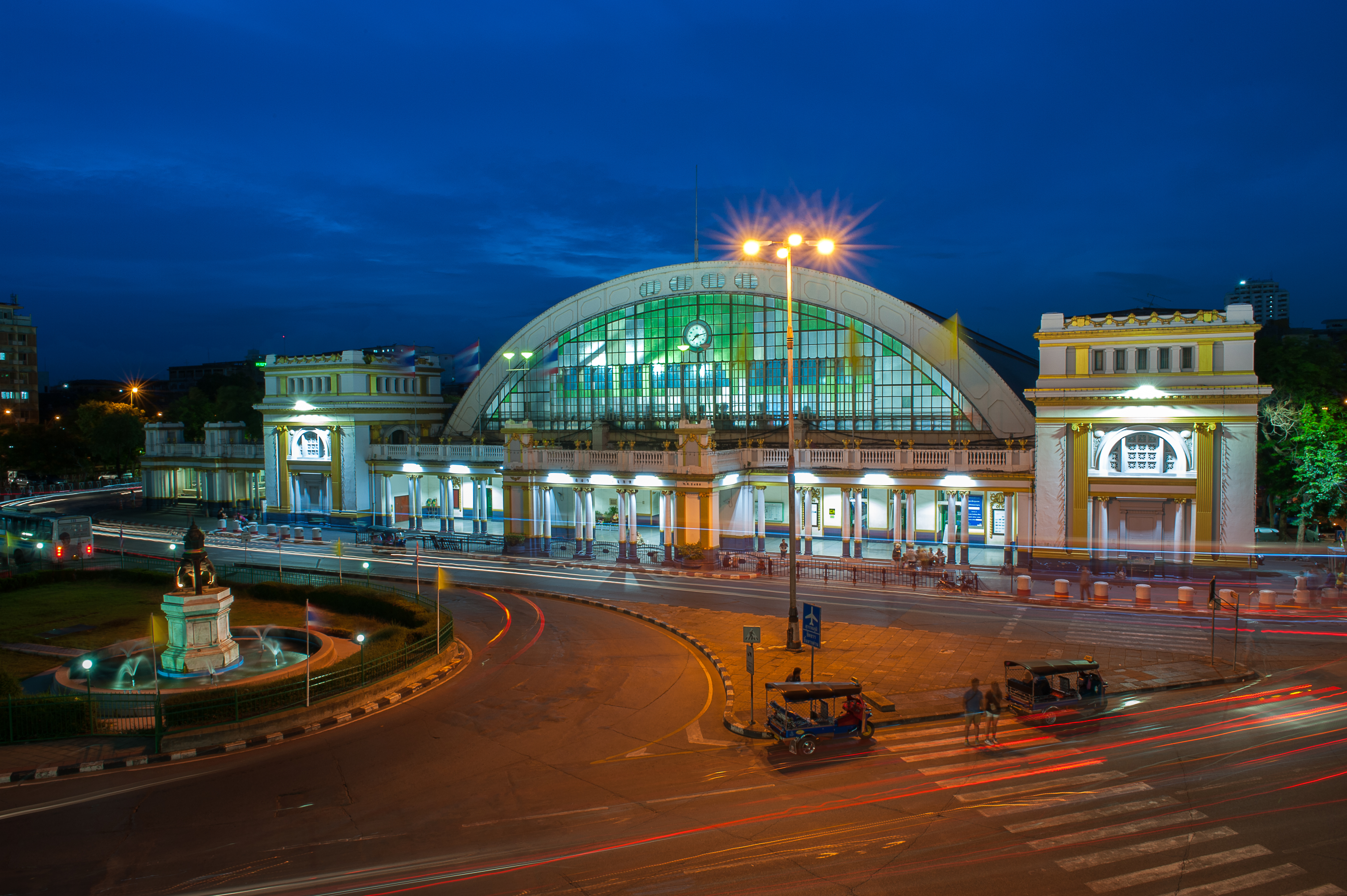
Hua Lamphong Railway Station

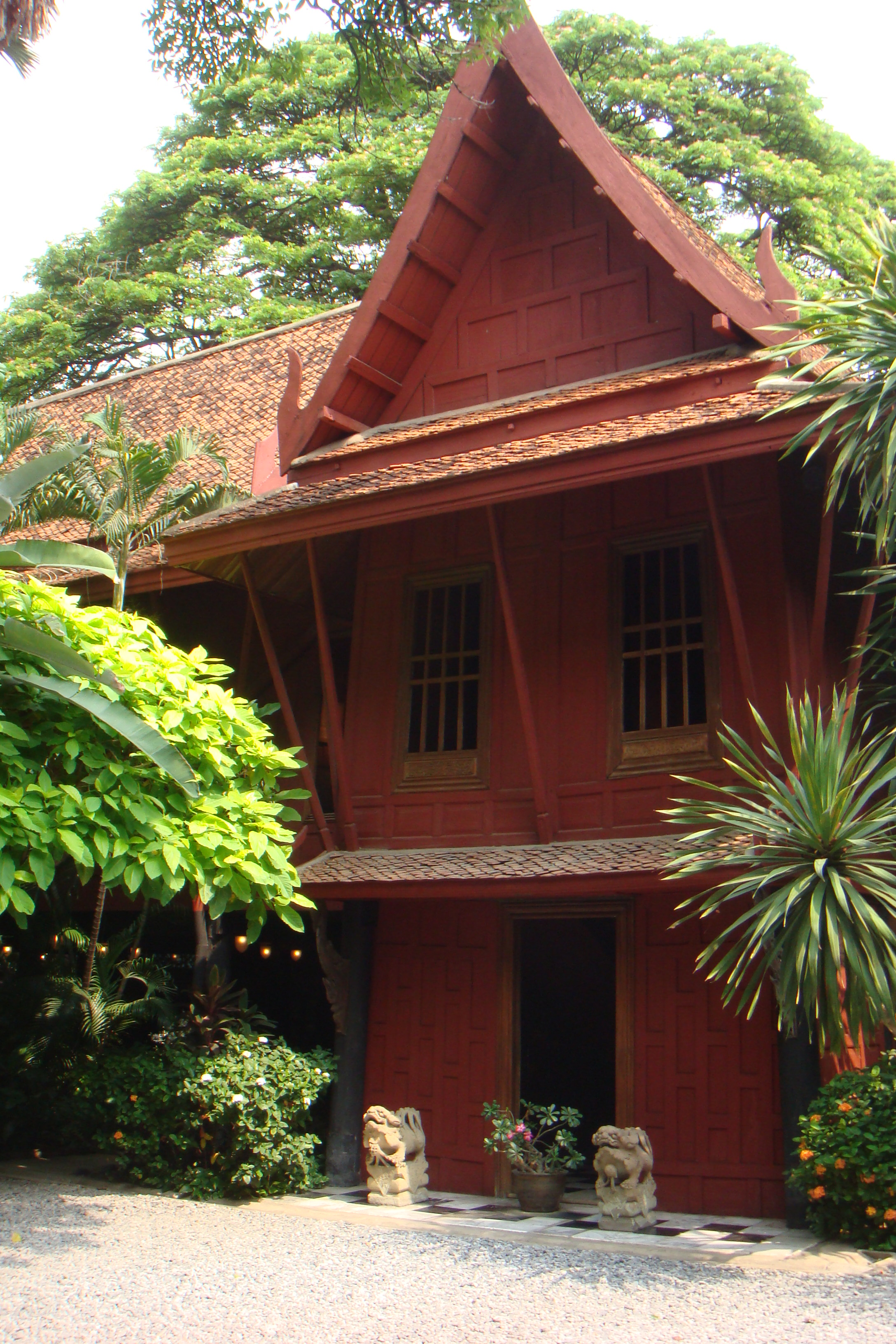
Jim Thompson House

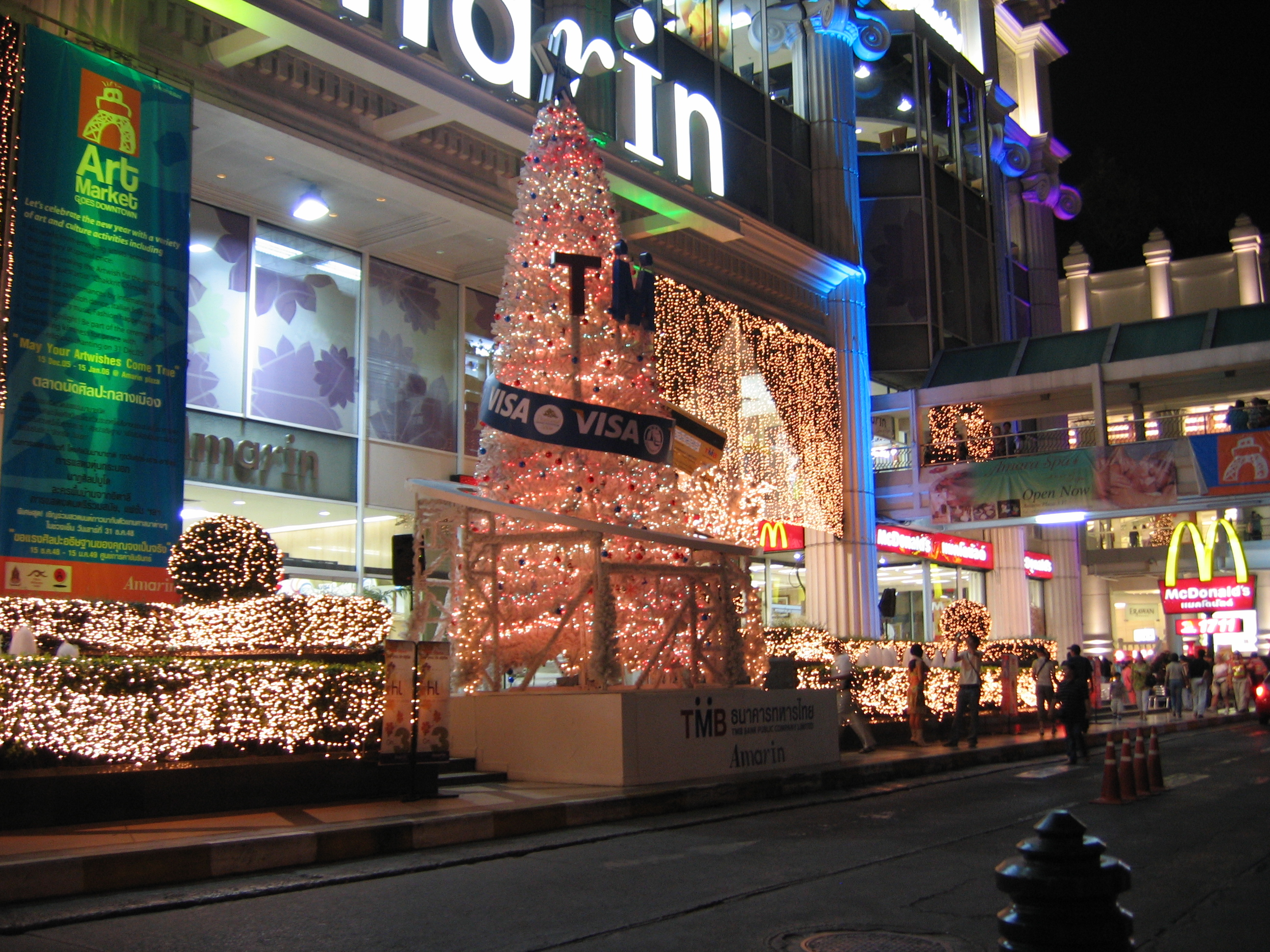
Lights, Gaysorn Amarin

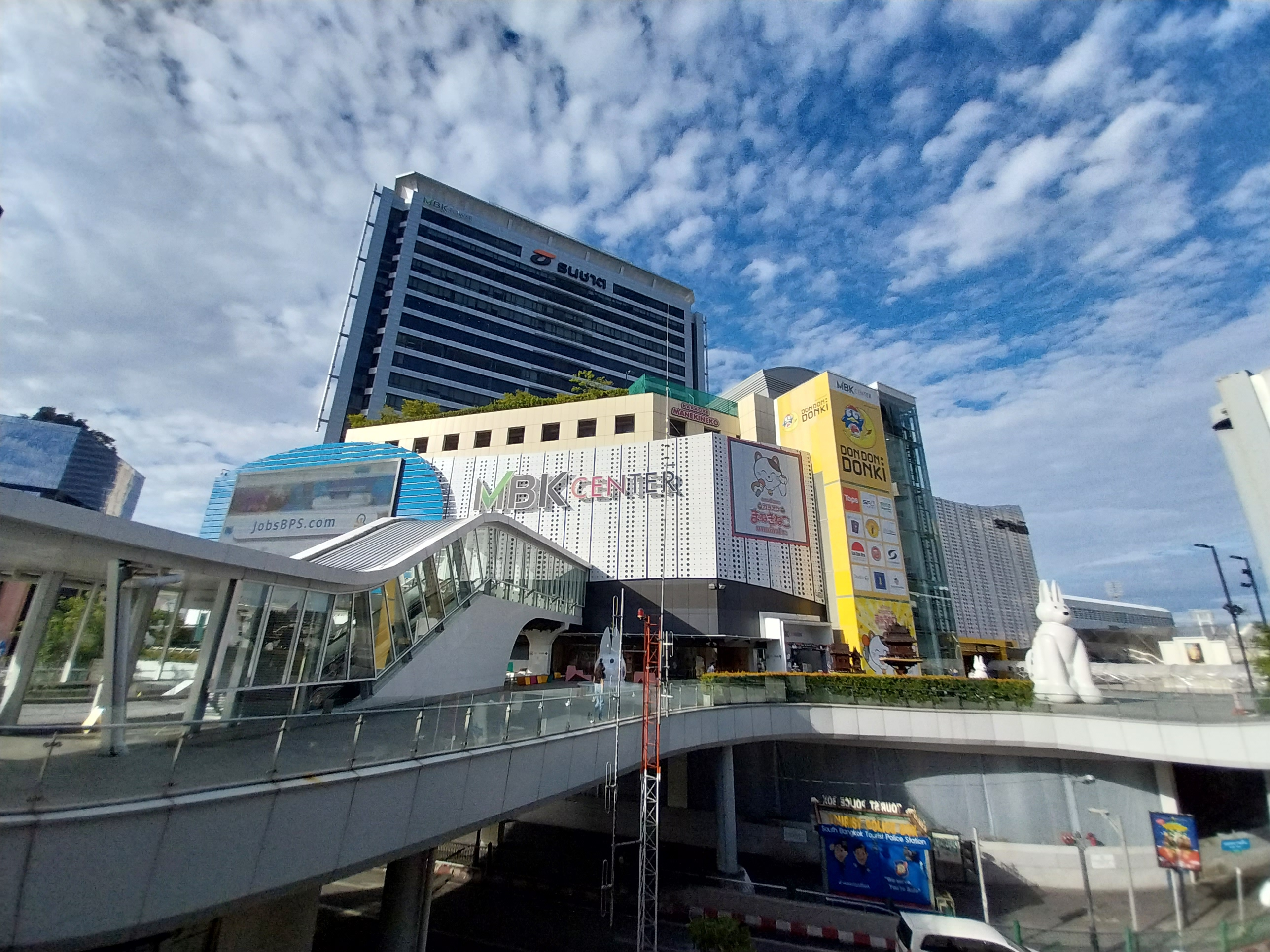
MBK Center on Rama I Road

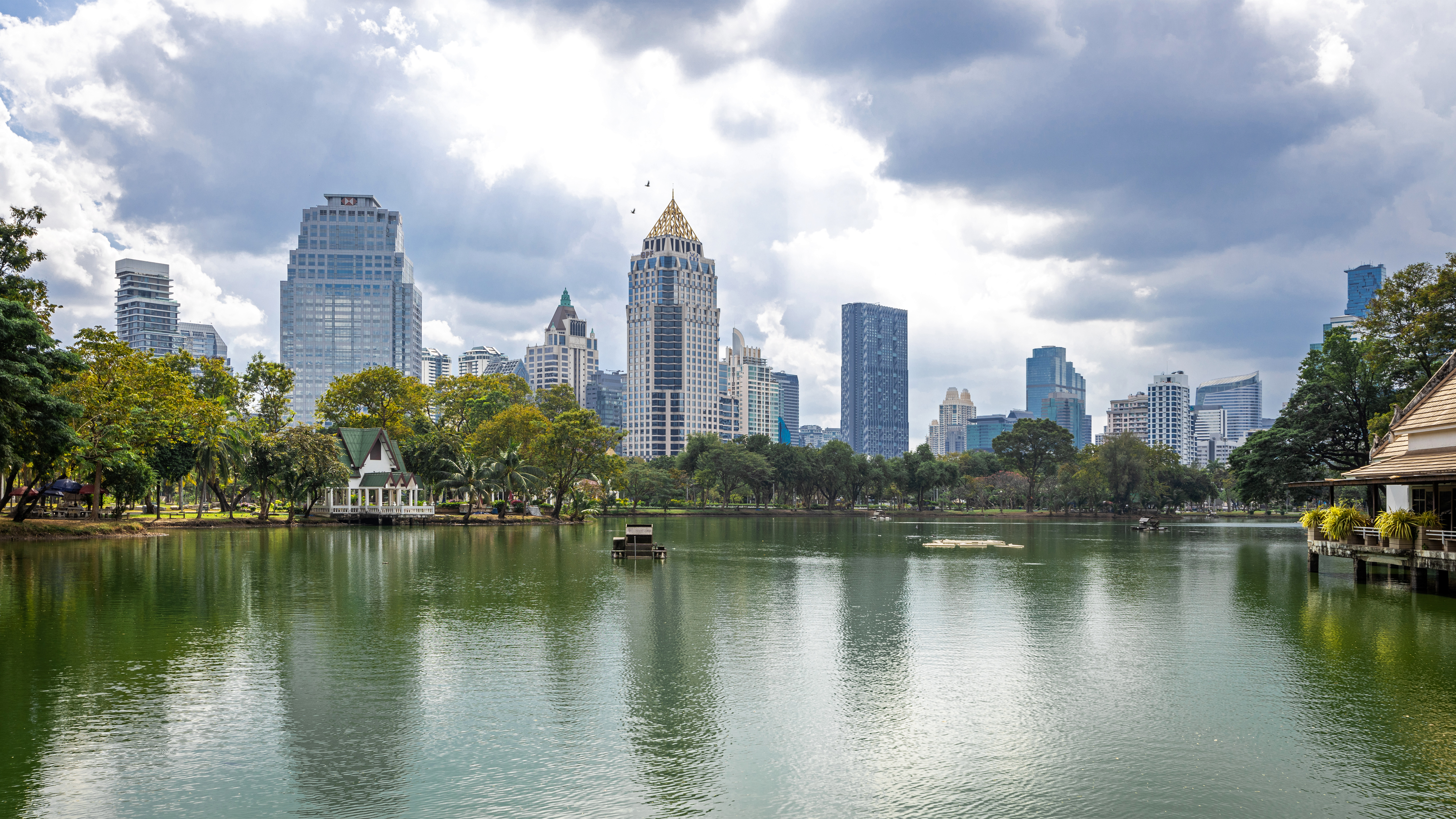
Lake, Lumphini Park

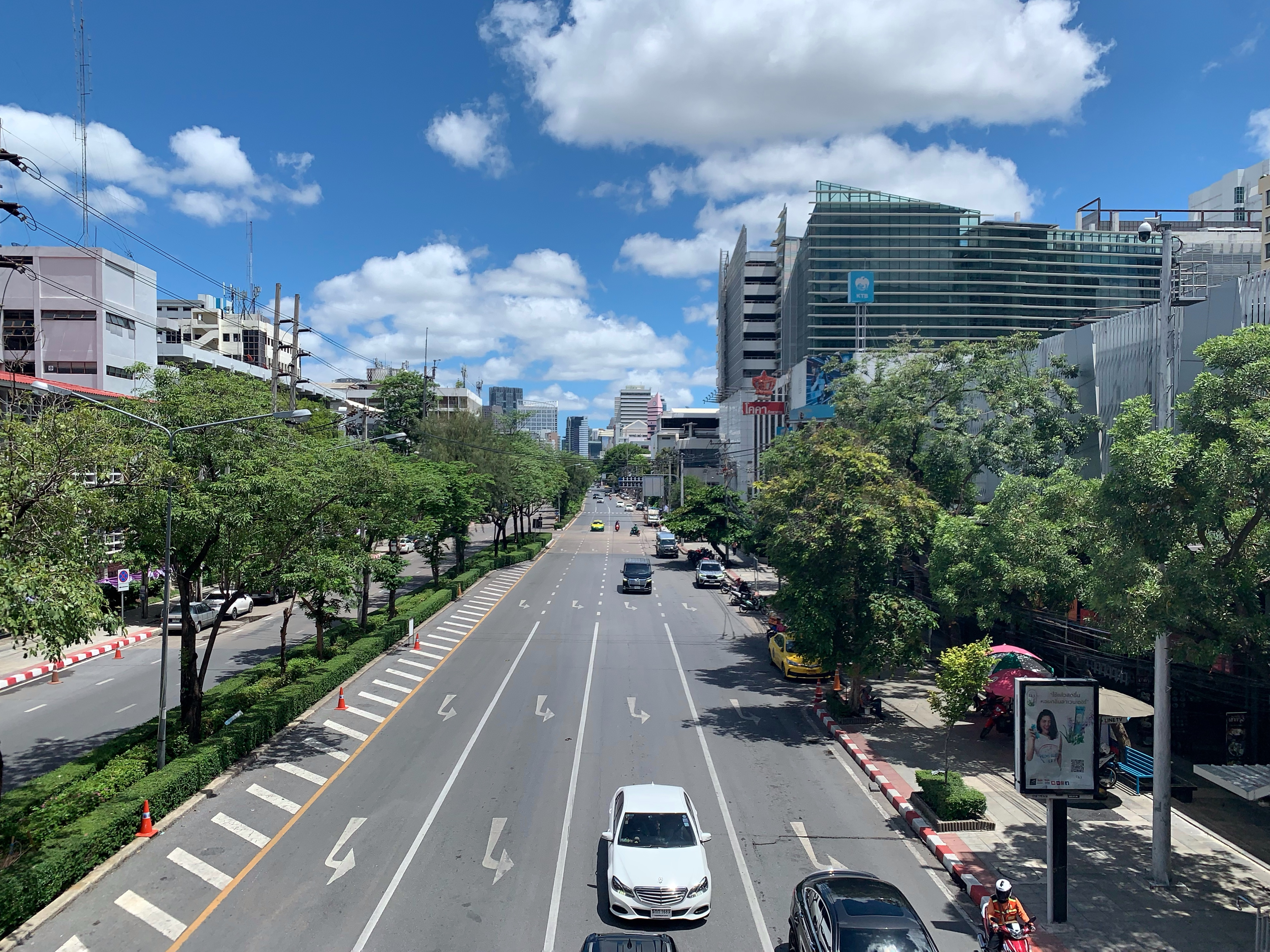
Henri Dunant Road

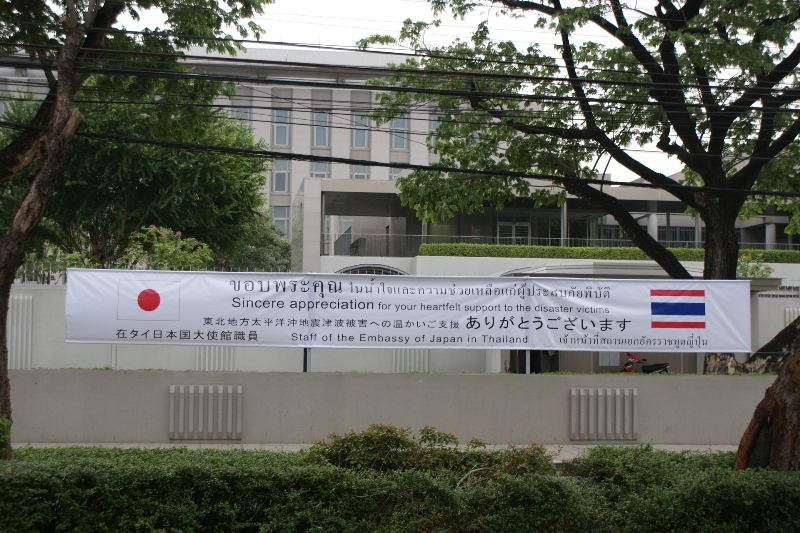
Embassy of Japan on Witthayu Road ('Wireless Road') near Lumphini Park

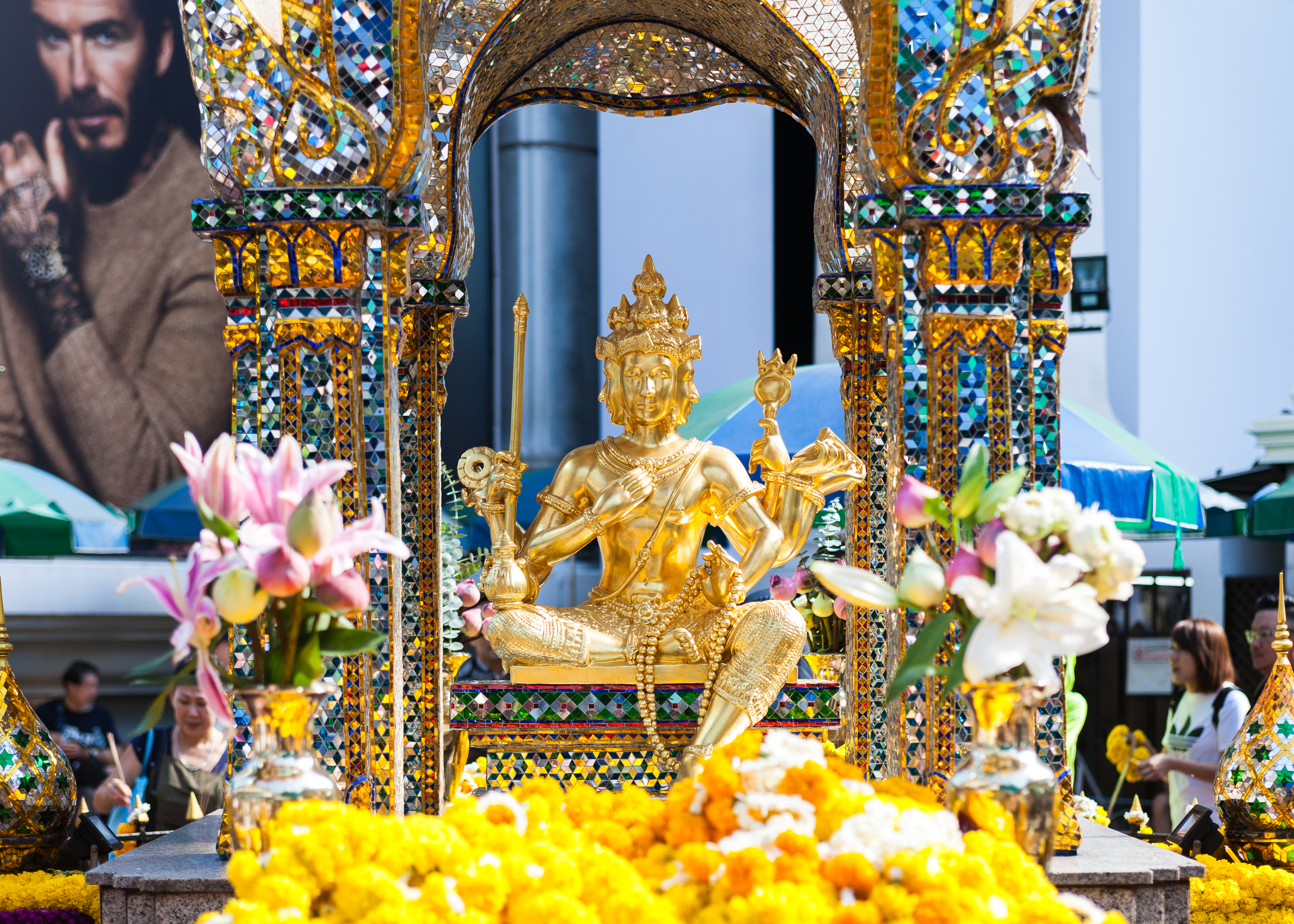
Erawan Shrine, Ratchaprasong Intersection

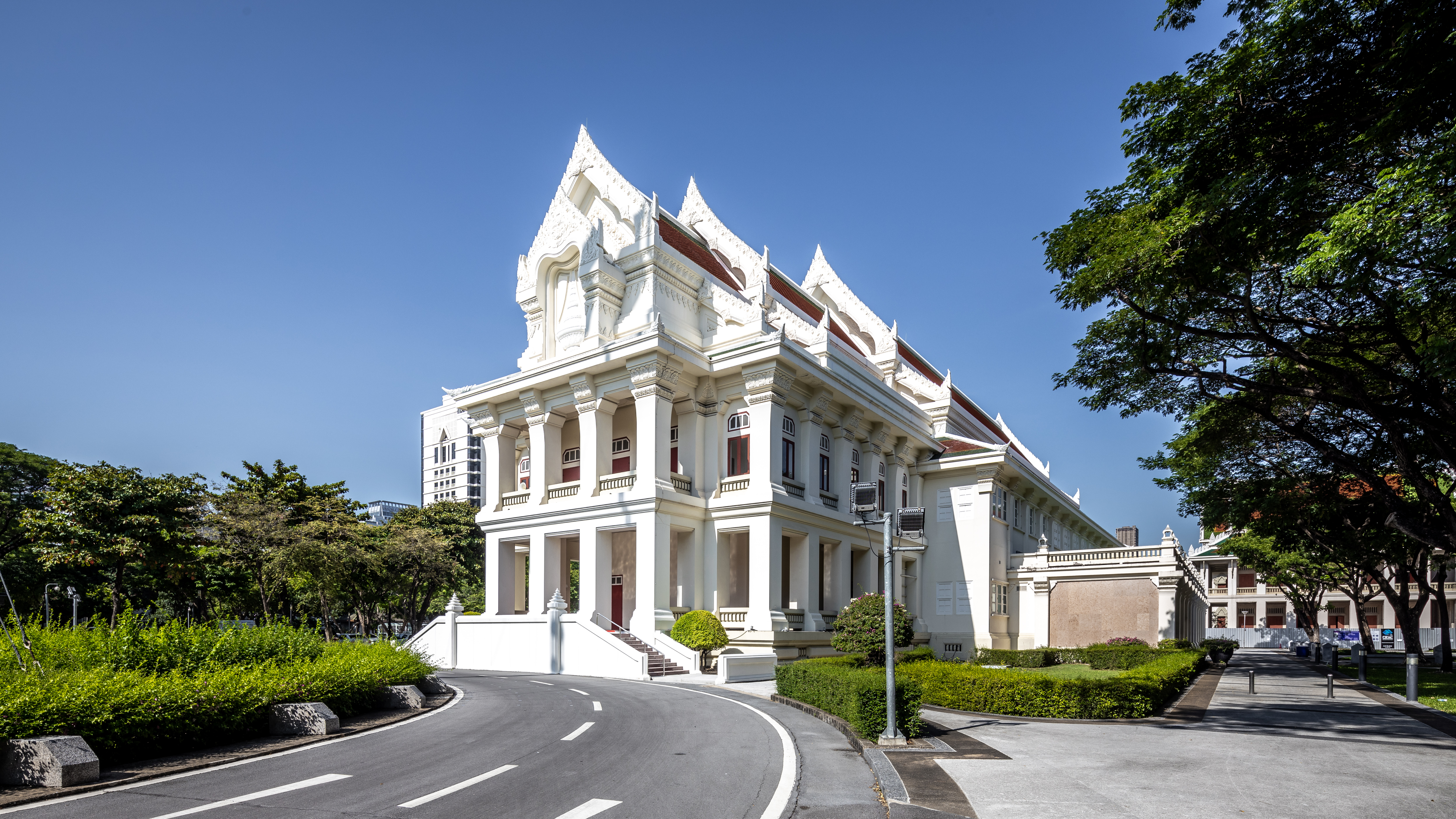
Auditorium, Chulalongkorn University
