= Wat Pathum Wanaram =

Buddhist temple in Bangkok, Thailand

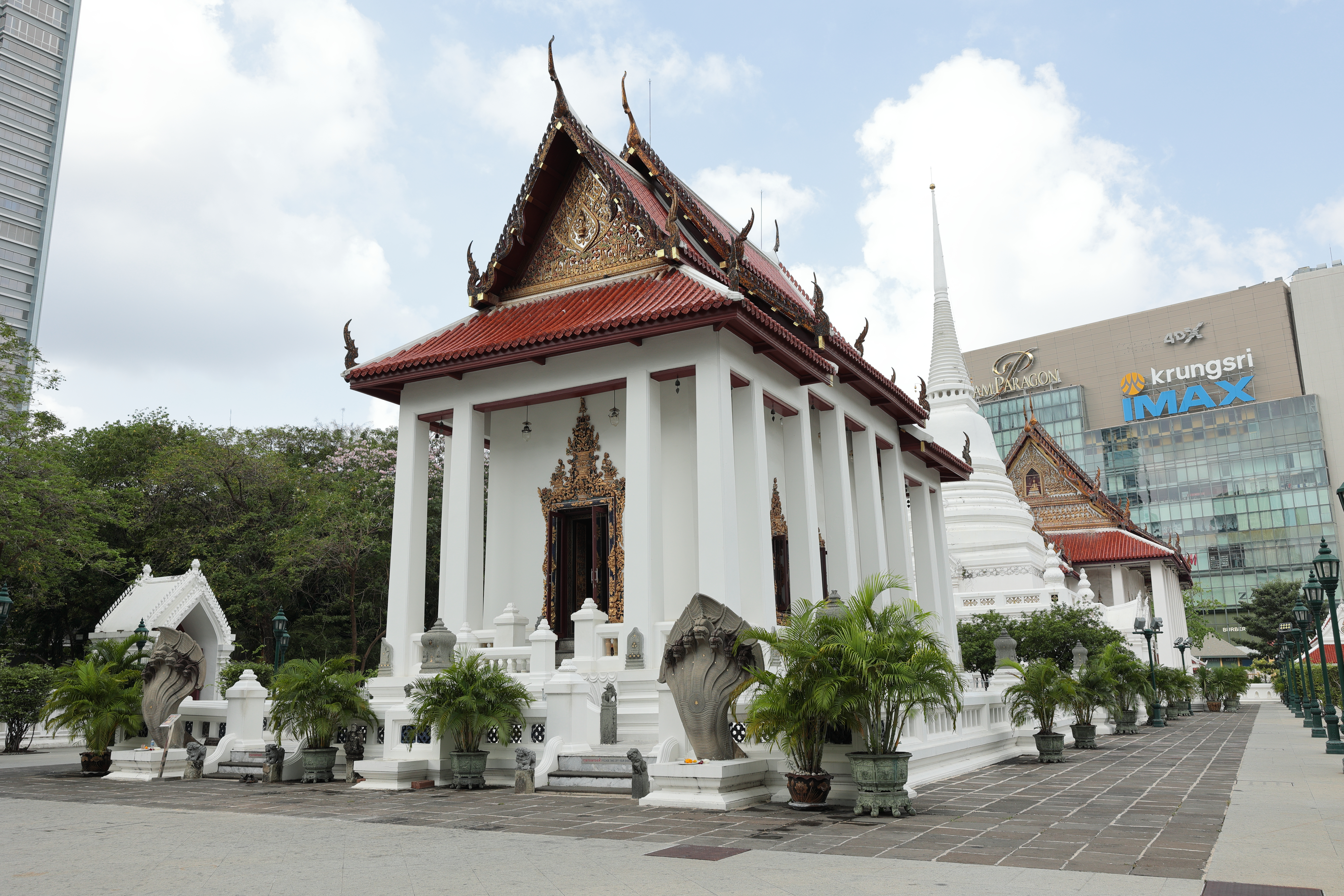
- Wat Pathum Wanaram

- Location within Bangkok

Religion
- Affiliation: Buddhism

Location
- Country: Thailand
- Coordinates: 13.745815°N 100.536537°E

Architecture
- Founder: King Mongkut (Rama IV)
- Completed: 1857

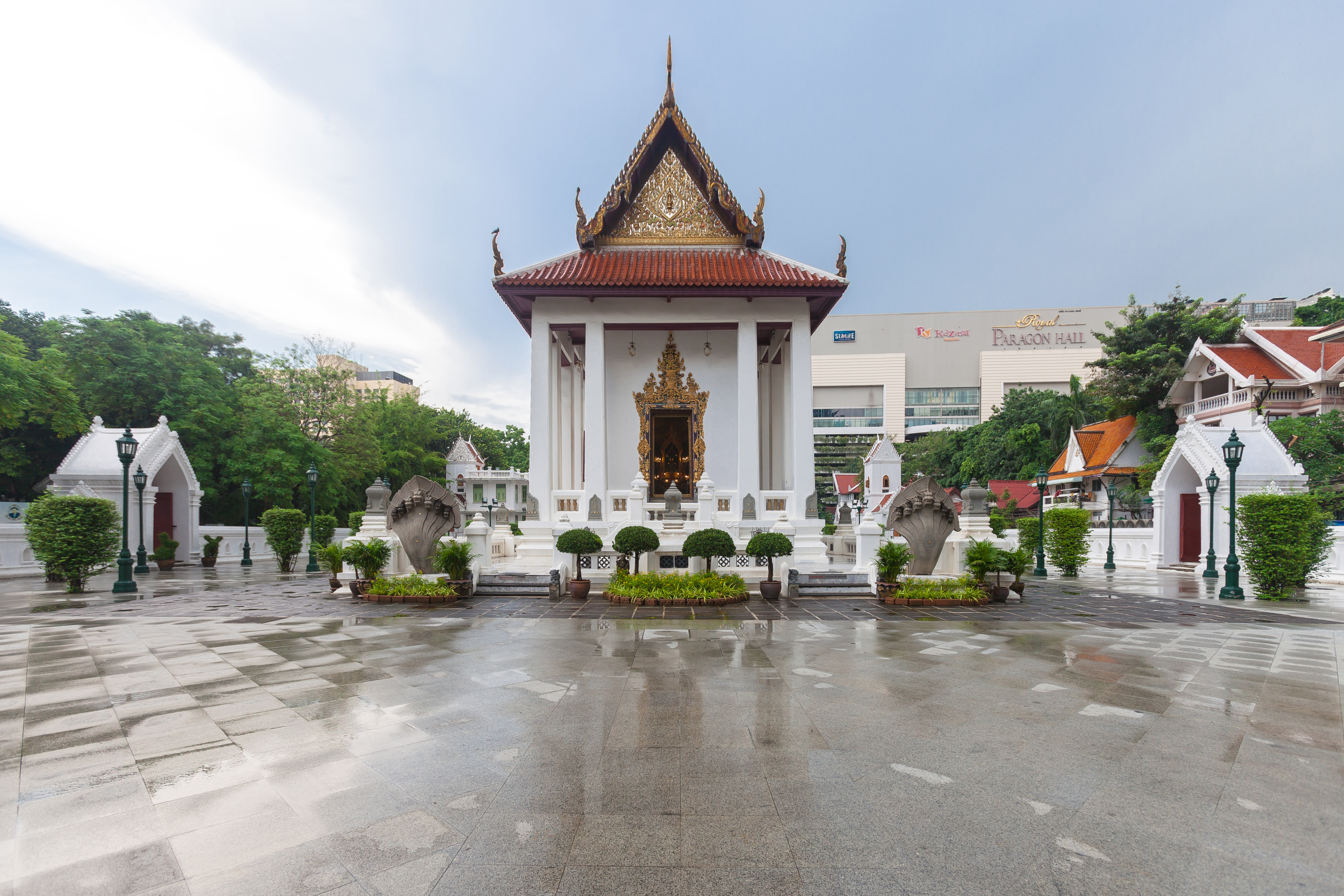
Ubosot of Wat Pathum Wanaram

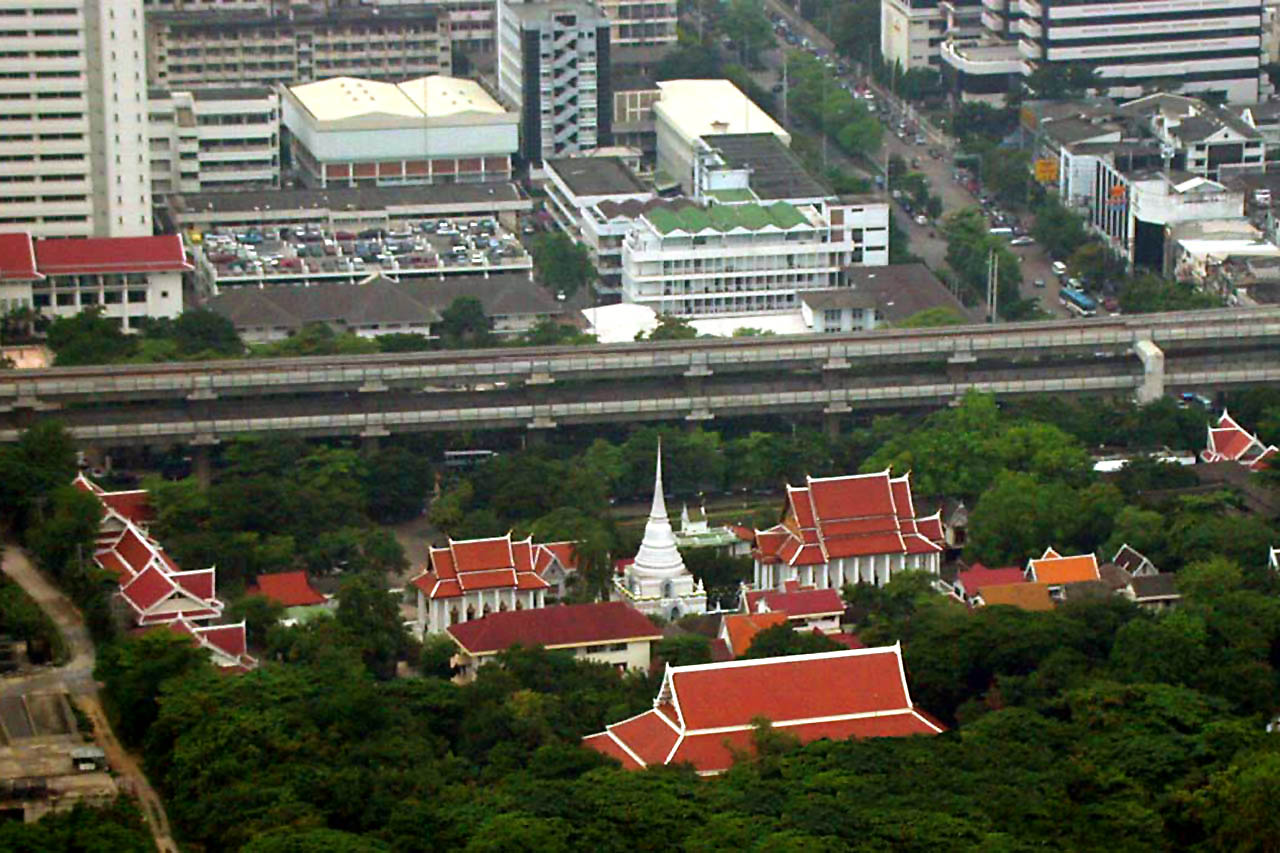
Wat Pathum Wanaram seen from Baiyoke Tower 2

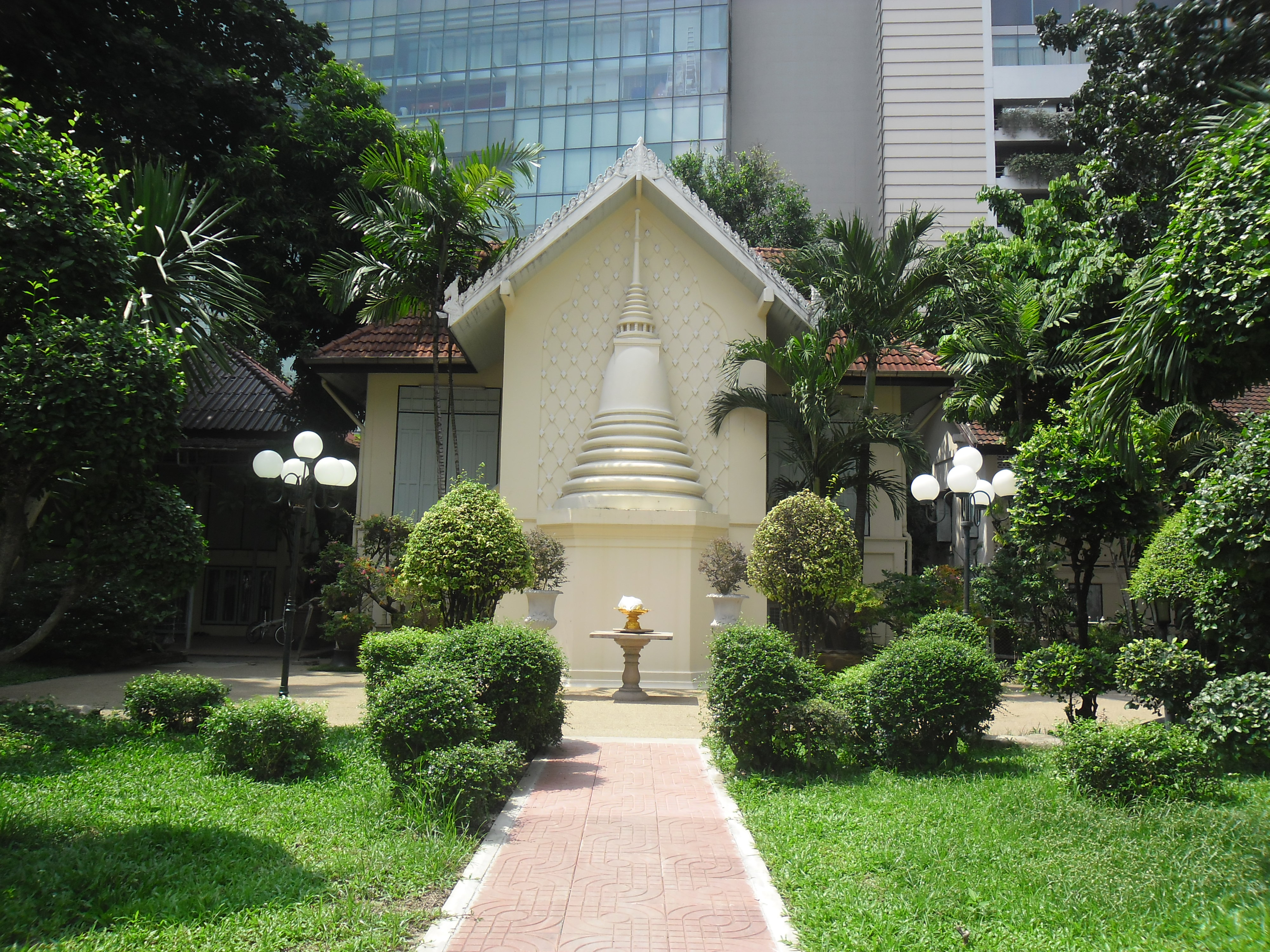
House of Mahidol Memorial

Wat Pathum Wanaram (Thai: วัดปทุมวนาราม) or Wat Pathum for short is a Buddhist temple in Bangkok, Thailand. It is located in the Pathum Wan District, between the two shopping malls Siam Paragon and CentralWorld, and across the street of Siam Square.

== History ==
The temple was founded in 1857 by King Mongkut (Rama IV) as a place of worship near his Sa Pathum Palace. At the time of its founding the area was still only rice fields, only accessible via the Khlong Saen Saeb. The temple is a third class royal temple of the Thammayut Nikaya order. The full name of the temple is Wat Pathum Wanaram Ratcha Wora Viharn (วัดปทุมวนารามราชวรวิหาร).

Among the various buildings of the temple is a sala partially reconstructed from the crematorium of the late Princess Mother of Thailand. The crematorium was a rare example of ancient craftsmanship featuring ornate stencils and lacquered sculptures. Known in Thai as phra men, it represents Mount Meru, the heavenly abode of the gods.

== House of Mahidol Memorial ==
The ashes of Thai Royal Family members in the line of Queen Savang Vadhana and Prince Mahidol Adulyadej are interred at House of Mahidol Memorial inside the temple.

== Incident ==
In 2010, during the crackdown of Red Shirts anti-government protesters, Wat Pathum Wanaram was used as a "safe zone" for injured people to get first aid. On 19 May 2010, six people were killed by bullets shooting from outside the temple.

== See also ==
- Siam District
- Wat Borommaniwat Ratchaworawihan
