= Pathumwan Institute of Technology =

- สถาบันเทคโนโลยีปทุมวัน
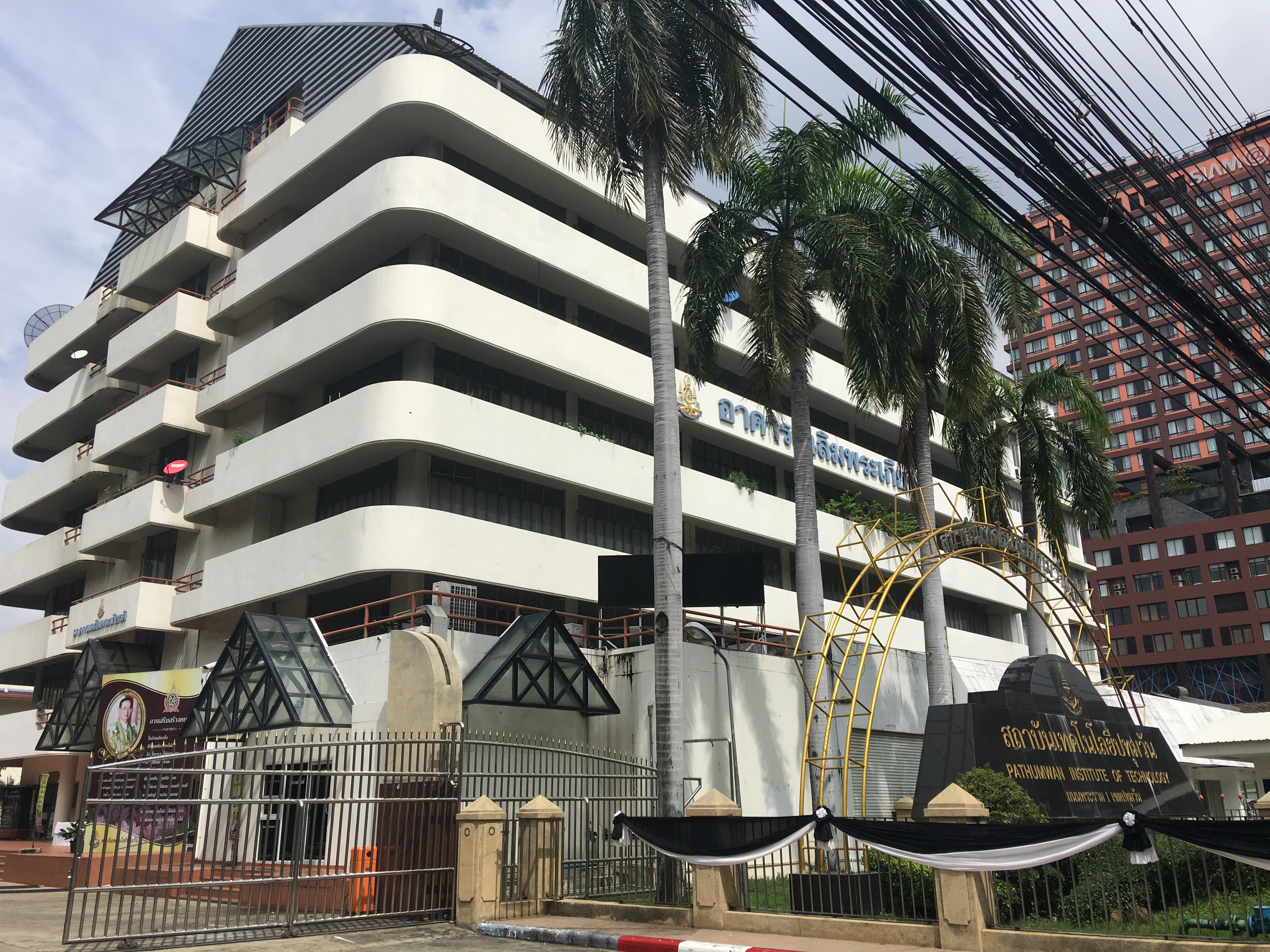
- Motto: เรียนดีมีงานทำ (Official)
- Type: Public
- Established: 1999 (founded as a technical school in 1932)
- Founder: Thai Naval Officers
- Academic affiliations: Bachelor degree, Master degree and Doctoral degree
- Royal conferrer: Maha Chakri Sirindhorn, Princess Royal of Thailand on behalf of the King
- Location: Pathum Wan, Bangkok, Thailand; 13°44′50″N 100°31′31″E
- Colors: Yellow Scarlet
- Website: Official website

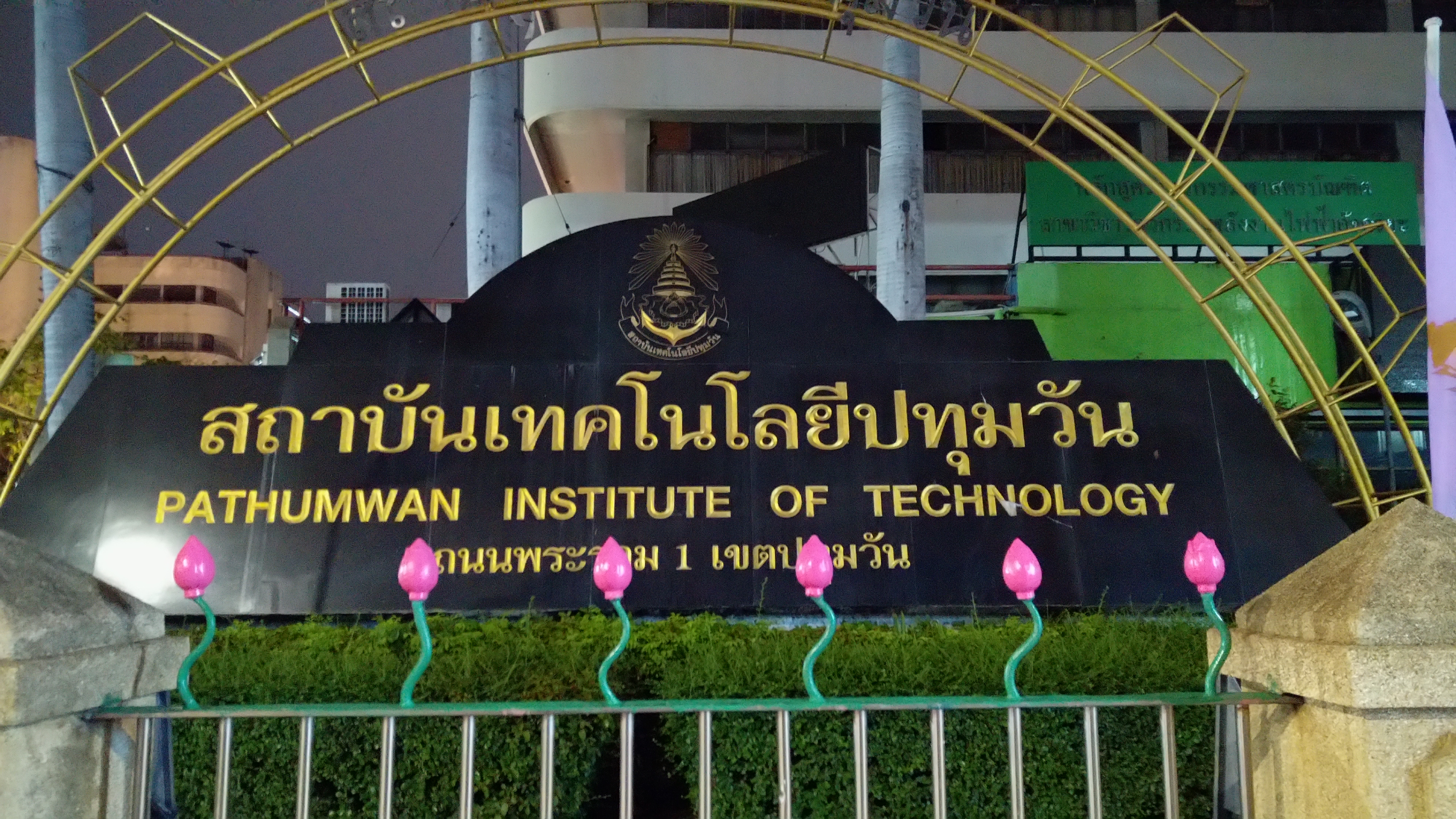
Nameboard of the Pathumwan Institute of Technology.

The Pathumwan Institute of Technology (Thai: สถาบันเทคโนโลยีปทุมวัน, RTGS: Sathaban Theknoloyi Pathumwan) is a Thai public university in Pathum Wan District, Bangkok, Thailand.

Established in 1932 as a technical school by a group of Thai naval officers, the institute was upgraded to technical college in 1975. It eventually became a public university known as Pathumwan Institute of Technology in 1999, the name was given by King Bhumibol Adulyadej (Thailand's King Rama IX).

In the present, Pathumwan Institute of Technology enrolls in undergraduate, graduate and doctoral programs for engineering. The institute developed new education standard to support in high level research of technology and engineering. The institute have operates with educational university and work experience learning in company. The institute has sign contract to cooperative with many company and enterprise for new project about real experience for students during industrial working. In 2018, electrical engineering students in undergraduate, graduate and doctoral levels called their name are Entaneer like engineering students of Chiangmai University, King Mongkut's University of Technology Thonburi, King Mongkut's Institute of Technology Ladkrabang, King Mongkut's University of Technology North Bangkok and Khon Kaen University.

The institute has two academic units: the faculty of engineering and the faculty of science and technology.
