= Jim Thompson House =

Museum in Bangkok

Coordinates: 13°44′57″N 100°31′42″E

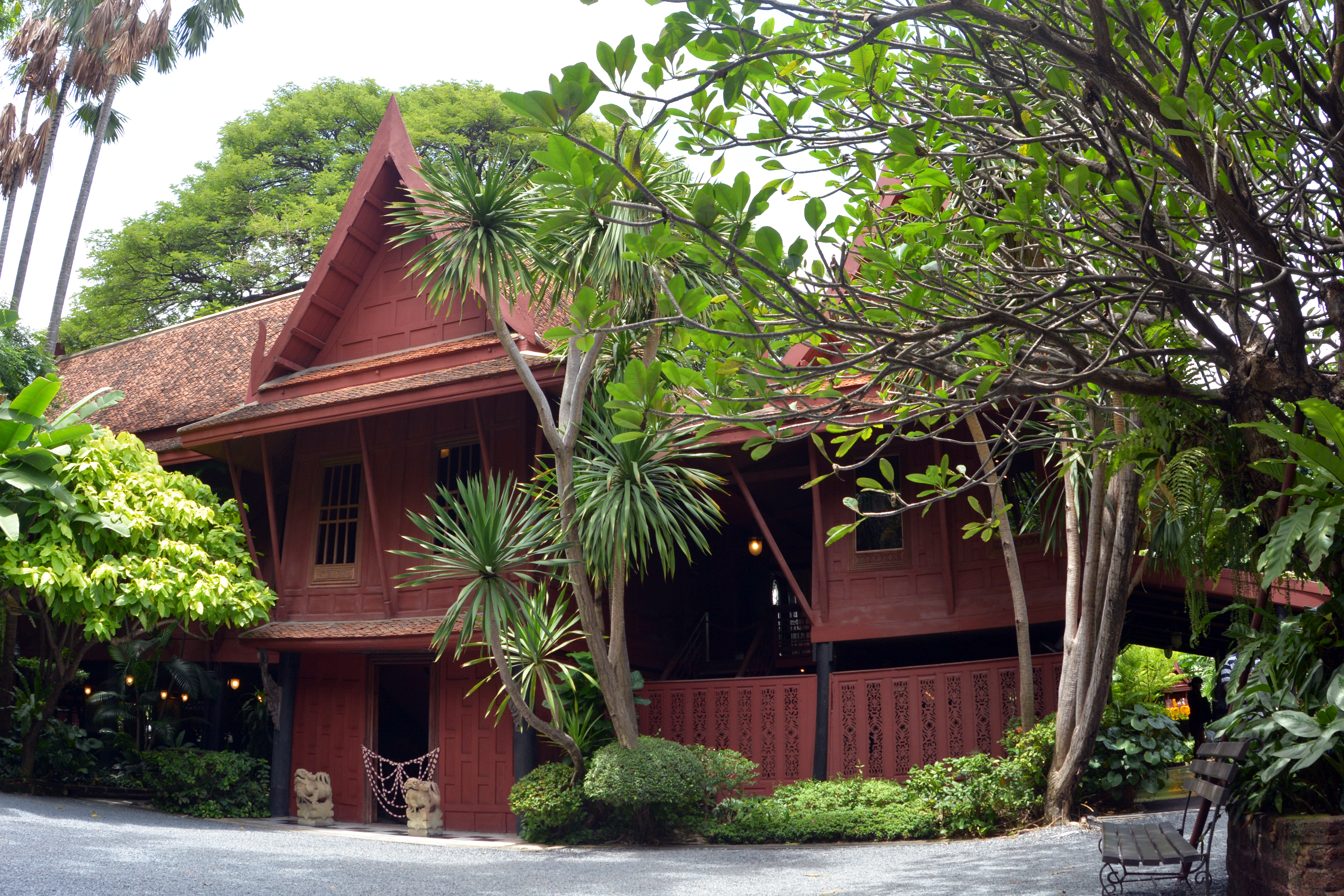
- Location: Pathum Wan, Bangkok, Thailand

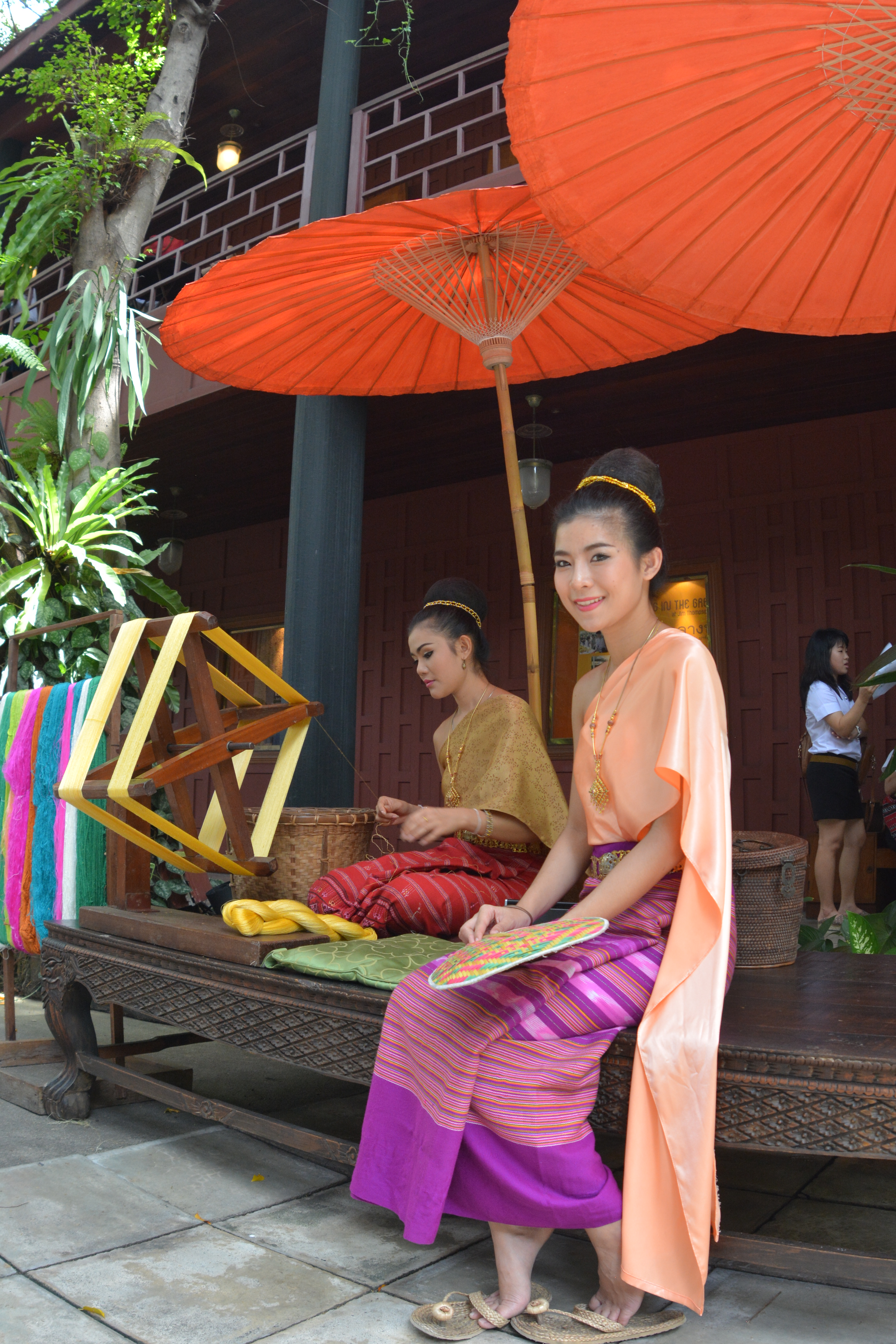
Silk loom, Jim Thompson House

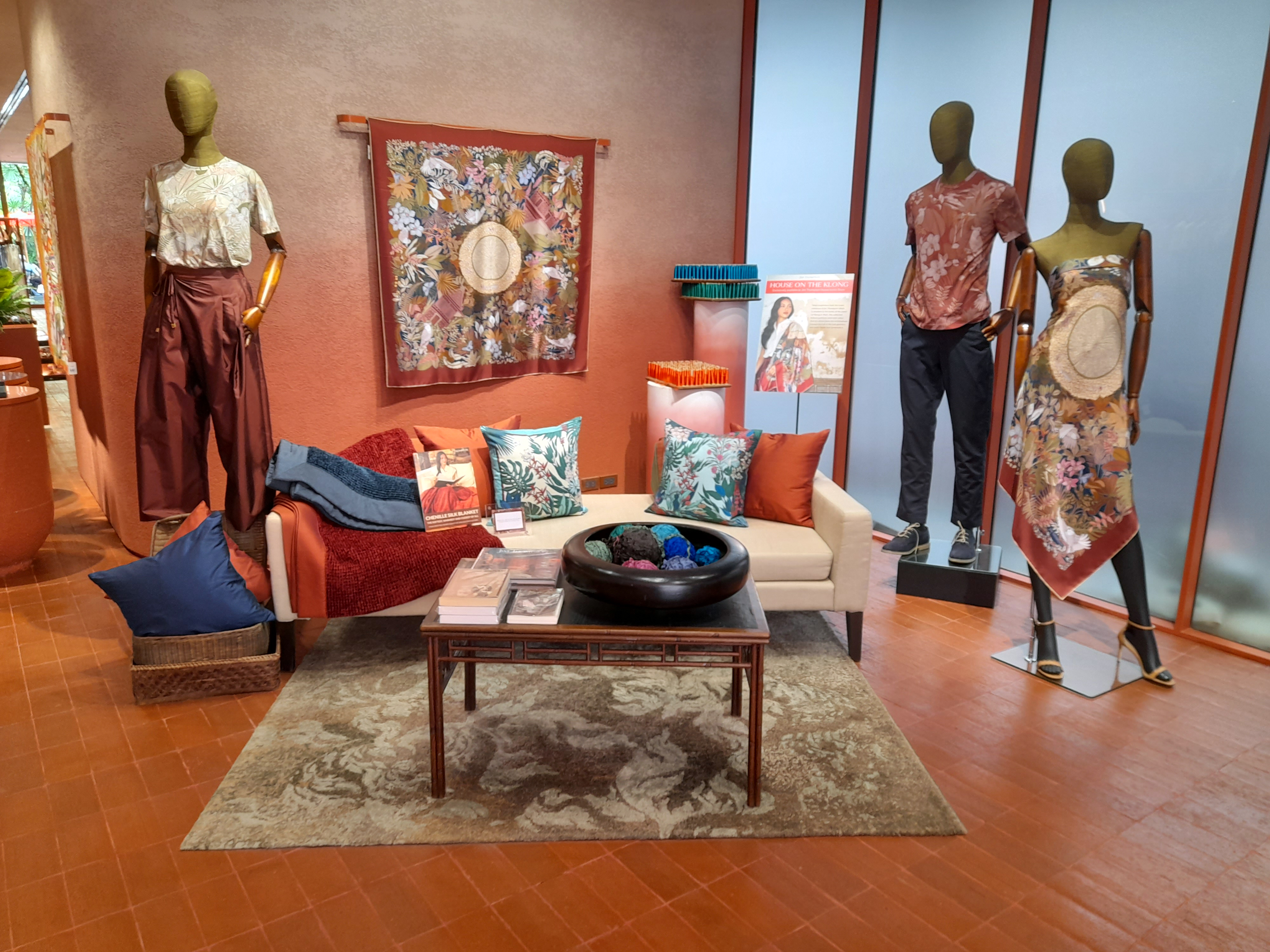
Sales outlet of Jim Thompson House

The Jim Thompson House is a museum in central Bangkok, Thailand, housing the art collection of American businessman and architect James Harrison Wilson Thompson or simply Jim Thompson, the museum designer and former owner. Built in 1959, the museum spans one rectangular rai of land (approximately half an acre or 2023.43 square meters).

Following his relocation to Bangkok and the establishment of the Thai Silk Company Ltd. in 1948, Thompson also became a major collector of Southeast Asian art, which was not well known among Westerners at the time. Attracted by the subtlety of their craftsmanship and expression, he built a large collection of historical Buddhist statues and traditional Thai paintings made of wood, cloth, and paper that depicted the life of Buddha and the legend of Vessantara Jataka. He collected secular art not only from Thailand but from Burma, Cambodia, and Laos, frequently travelling to those countries on buying trips. His collection also consisted of white and blue porcelain from China, which made its way into Thailand around the 16th and 17th centuries.

In 1958, he began what was to be the pinnacle of his architectural achievement, a new home to live in and to showcase his art collection. The museum was planned to consist of a complex combination of six traditional Thai-style houses, primarily constructed of wood, and various old Thai structures that were collected from all parts of Thailand in the 1950s and 1960s. His home sits on a klong (canal) Saen Saep across from Bangkrua, where his company's weavers were then located. Most of the 19th-century houses were dismantled and moved from Ayutthaya, but the largest, a weaver's house (now the living room), came from Bangkrua.

After Thompson's disappearance in Malaysia in 1967, the house came under the control of The James H. W. Thompson Foundation under the royal patronage of Princess Maha Chakri Sirindhorn. The house is at 6 Soi Kasemsan 2, Rama 1 Road, Pathumwan, one block away from Bangkok National Stadium; guided tours are available.

== Literature ==
- Lenzi, Iola (2004). Museums of Southeast Asia. Singapore: Archipelago Press. p. 200. ISBN 981-4068-96-9.
