= Thai Daimaru =

Department store

The building exterior, pictured 1966

Thai Daimaru was a department store in Bangkok, operated by the Japanese department store chain Daimaru. It first opened on Ratchaprasong Intersection (at the current location of CentralWorld) in 1964, and famously introduced air conditioning and escalators to the Thai public. It reopened as part of the modern shopping mall Rajadamri Arcade in 1972, and later relocated to Seri Center on Srinagarindra Road when its lease expired in 1994. The store was initially very successful, but struggled to keep up with rising competition from Thai-owned companies in its later decades. With the fallout of the 1997 Asian financial crisis, Daimaru sold off its Thailand operations to Premier Group in 1998. Operations under the Daimaru brand ceased in 2000.
