= Sa Pathum Palace =

Royal residence in Bangkok

Coordinates: 13.7481°N 100.5320°E

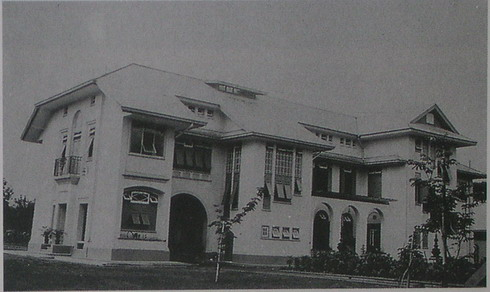
Sa Pathum Palace

Sa Pathum Palace (Thai: วังสระปทุม, RTGS: Wang Sa Pathum) is a royal residence in Pathum Wan District, Bangkok, Thailand. It has been a residence of the Thai Royal Family, especially the House of Mahidol, since the 19th century, and is the official residence of Princess Sirindhorn.

== History ==
King Chulalongkorn intended to give his son, Prince Mahidol Adulyadej, a plot of land on Pathumwan Road for the building of a private residence. As the prince was still a student abroad the plan was not realised until the reign of King Vajiravudh, when land was granted to the prince in 1914.

Queen Savang Vadhana the prince's mother moved out of the Grand Palace and built a residence on the land. Under the queen's supervision the palace design and construction was undertaken by the Italian Paolo Remidi. The design of the palace was European, the exterior was painted in bright colours to protect the building from heat. The construction was completed in 1916.

After Prince Mahidol's permanent return to Siam in 1928, he lived at the Sa Pathum Palace with his wife Princess Srinagarindra and his mother. He died at the palace on the 24 September 1929. Queen Savang Vadhana died in 1955 and the palace became the official residence of Princess Srinagarindra, the princess mother. The princess died in 1995 and King Bhumibol Adulyadej, her son, gave the palace to Princess Sirindhorn as her official residence.

== Museum ==
After Princess Sirindhorn moved into the palace, the princess set about creating the Queen Savang Vadhana Museum in memory of her great-grandmother Queen Savang Vadhana, a consort of King Chulalongkorn and the grandmother of King Bhumibol Adulyadej. It was opened in 2008 inside Sa Pathum Palace. It is open from mid-December to March.

== Notable events ==
=== Wedding of Prince Mahidol Adulyadej and Sangwan Talapat ===
The royal wedding of Prince Mahidol Adulyadej and Sangwan Talapat (later Srinagarindra) was held at Sa Pathum Palace on 10 September 1920. The ceremony was presided over by Prince Mahidol Adulyadej's half-brother, King Vajiravudh.

=== Wedding of King Bhumibol Adulyadej and Sirikit Kitiyakara ===
The royal wedding of King Bhumibol Adulyadej and Sirikit Kitiyakara was held at Sa Pathum Palace on 28 April 1950. The ceremony was presided over by Queen Savang Vadhana, Bhumibol's grandmother.
