= Siam Square =

Shopping area in Bangkok, Thailand

Coordinates: 13°44′39.95″N 100°31′59.3″E

- สยามสแควร์

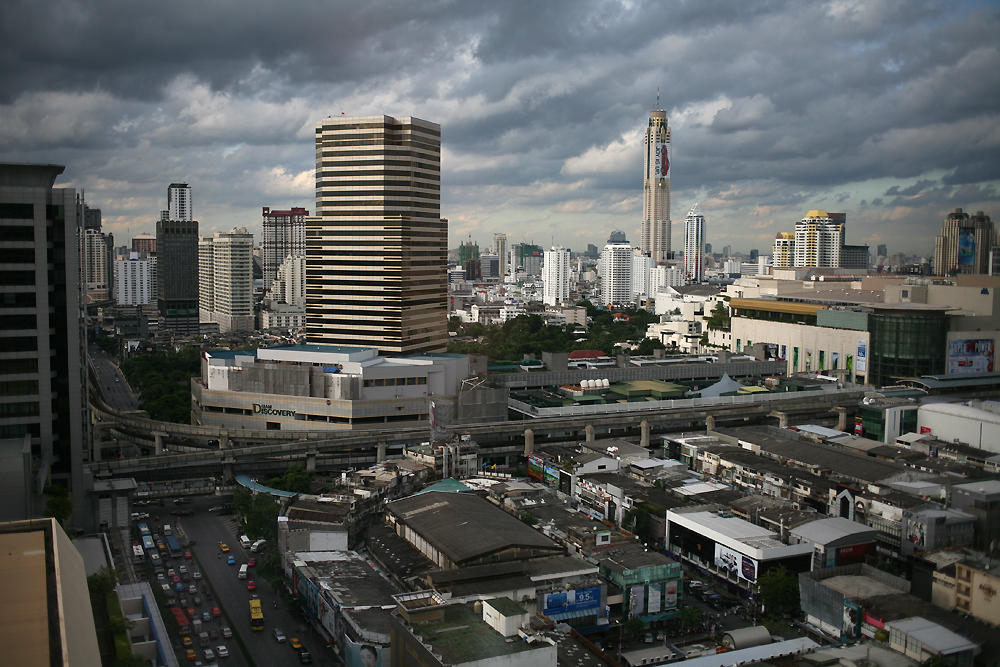
- Address: Phaya Thai Rd.-Rama I Rd., Pathum Wan, Pathum Wan, Bangkok
- Owner: Property Management of Chulalongkorn University
- Public transit: Siam BTS Station; National Stadium BTS station; Chit Lom BTS station

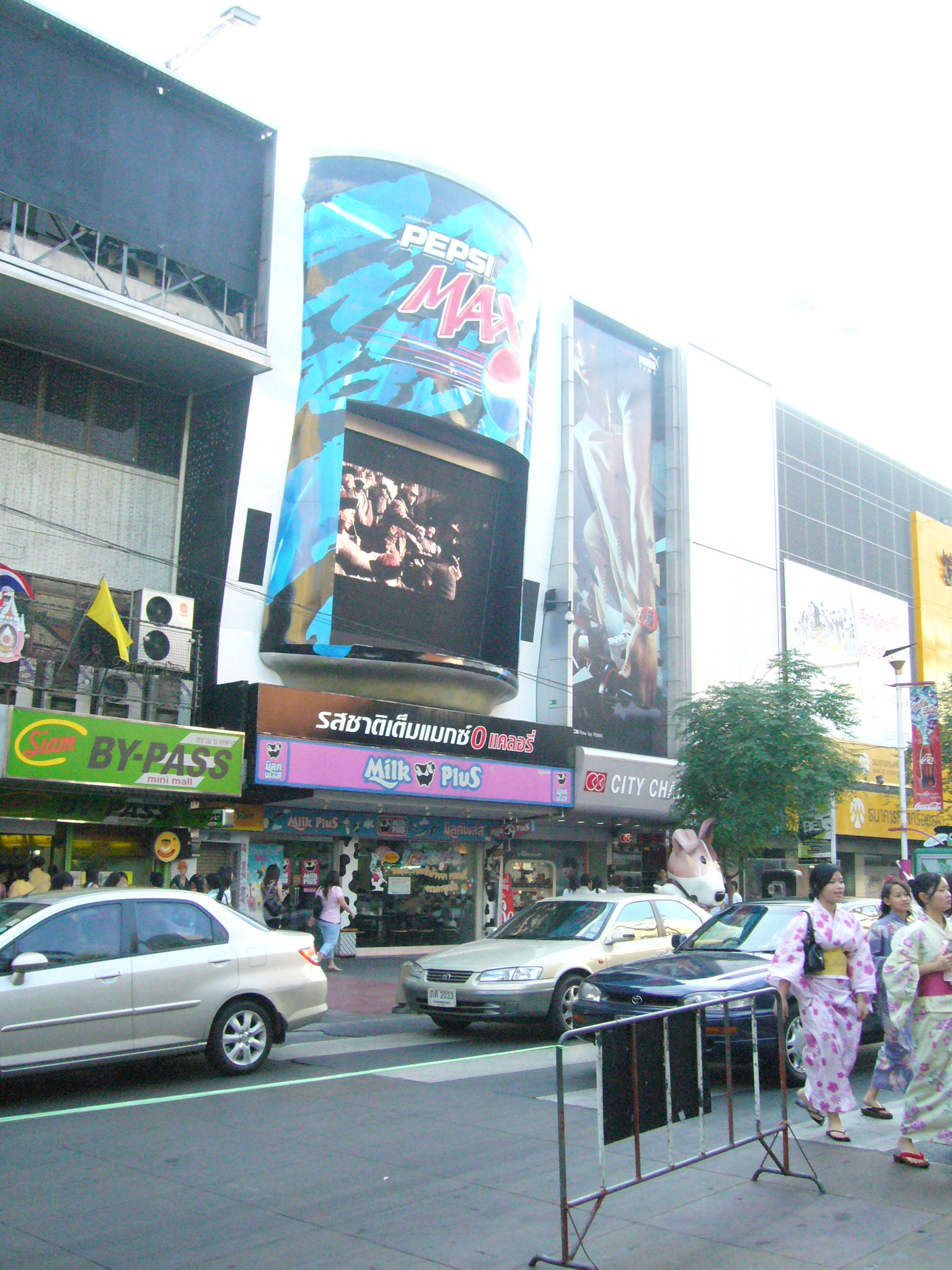
Siam Square Soi 7, a main road of Siam Square area

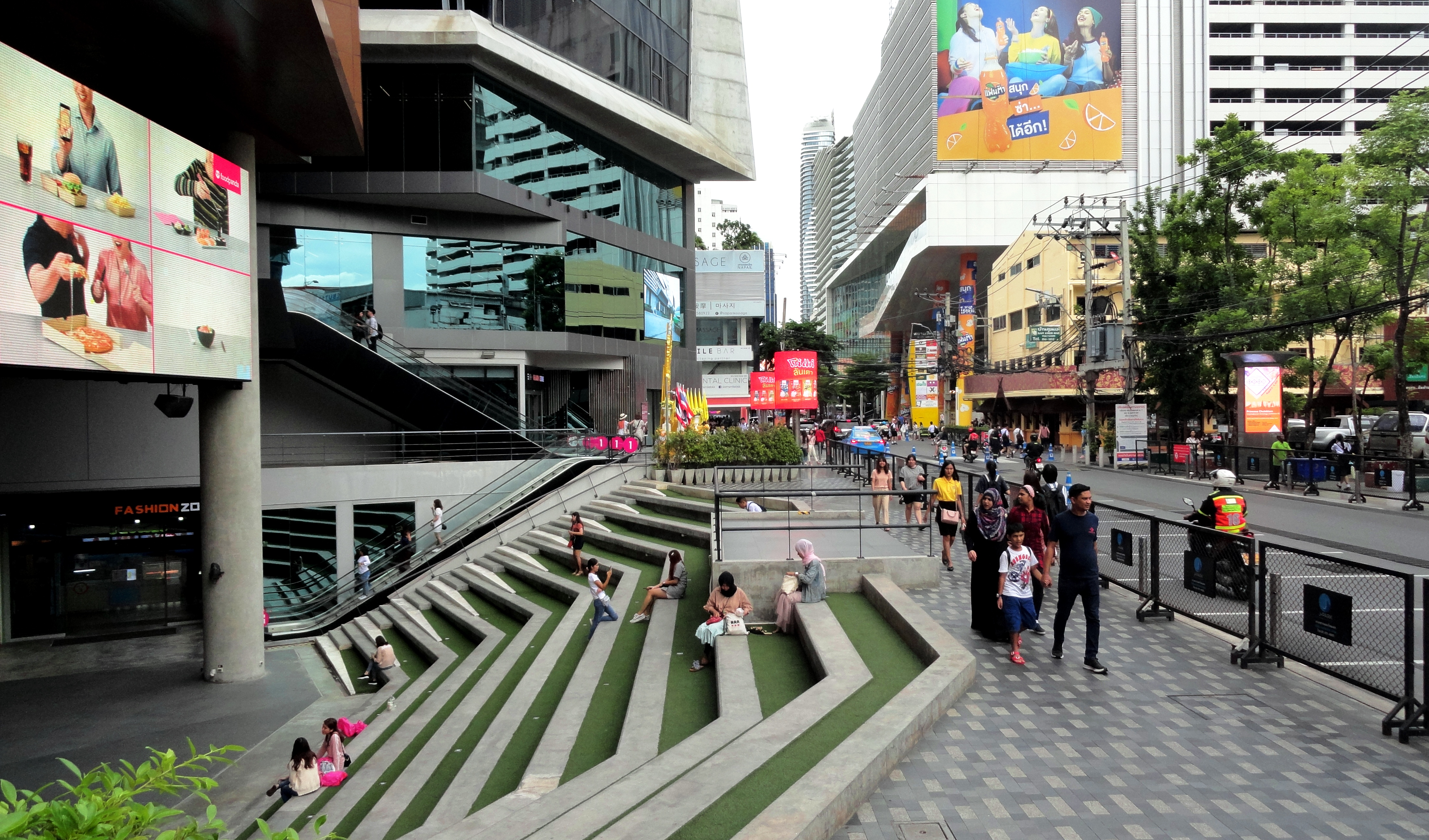
The entrance of Siam Square One

Siam Square (Thai: สยามสแควร์, pronounced [sā.jǎːm sā.kʰwɛ̄ː]) is a shopping and entertainment area in the Siam area of Bangkok, Thailand. The square is located at the corner of Phayathai Road and Rama I Road and is owned by Chulalongkorn University, managed by its Property Management Office, known as "Chula Property". It is connected to nearby shopping centers and shopping districts, such as MBK Center, Siam Paragon, and Ratchaprasong shopping district, by a skywalk.

== History ==
The area of Siam Square, which belongs to Chulalongkorn University, was originally full of wooden houses and slum areas, until a fire incident evacuated the villagers from the area. After the fire, General Prapas Charusatien (Thai: ประภาส จารุเสถียร) director of Chulalongkorn University at that time, decided to develop the area of Siam Square into a commercial place in order to prevent the slum community that originally resided there from returning. The Southeast Asia Company was the first to develop this area as an open-air shopping mall. The first building was constructed in 1962 and finished in 1963, with Associated Professor Lert Urasayanan as the architect and Professor Rachot Kanchanawanit as the engineer.

The original name of the square was Pathum Wan Square (Thai: ปทุมวันสแควร์), because it is in Pathum Wan District. However, Kobchai Sosothikul, founder of Seacon Development Co. and owner of the project at that time, felt that the name was too small and renamed it to Siam Square after the whole country, Siam being the old name of Thailand.

Later in 1991, various tutoring schools began opening in the Siam Square area, targeting students from the many schools nearby.

Siam Square entered a period of downturn In 1996, when the Thai economy was in a state of recession from IMF debt. The nearby construction of the BTS Skytrain at that time also caused traffic jams that drove customers to other shopping districts. To combat this issue, Chulalongkorn University initiated a project to turn Siam Square into a center of technology and development, with many improvements to the area in 1999 and 2000. One such development was relocating the parking lot behind the Lido cinema to the Witthayakit Building, opening up the space for outside companies to invest in developing the area, which became known as "Center Point" and served as a center of recreation for teenagers.

== Present day ==
Siam Square is maintained by the University Property Management Office of Chulalongkorn University. It has been compared to a "one-tenth miniature" of Bangkok in terms of catering for diverse needs, with over 4,200 shops in many styles and also many other types of services including many successful Thai businesses, tutor schools, restaurants, cafes, fashion, art, design, and many new emerging businesses.

The customers or visitors vary from young-aged school and college students to office workers and foreign tourists, although most are students coming to attend the tutoring institutions concentrated in the area: at least 30 schools are located here, making Siam Square the number one tutoring center in the country.

Siam Square is a popular destination and traffic hub, with at least 400,000 people traveling to and through Siam Square each day.

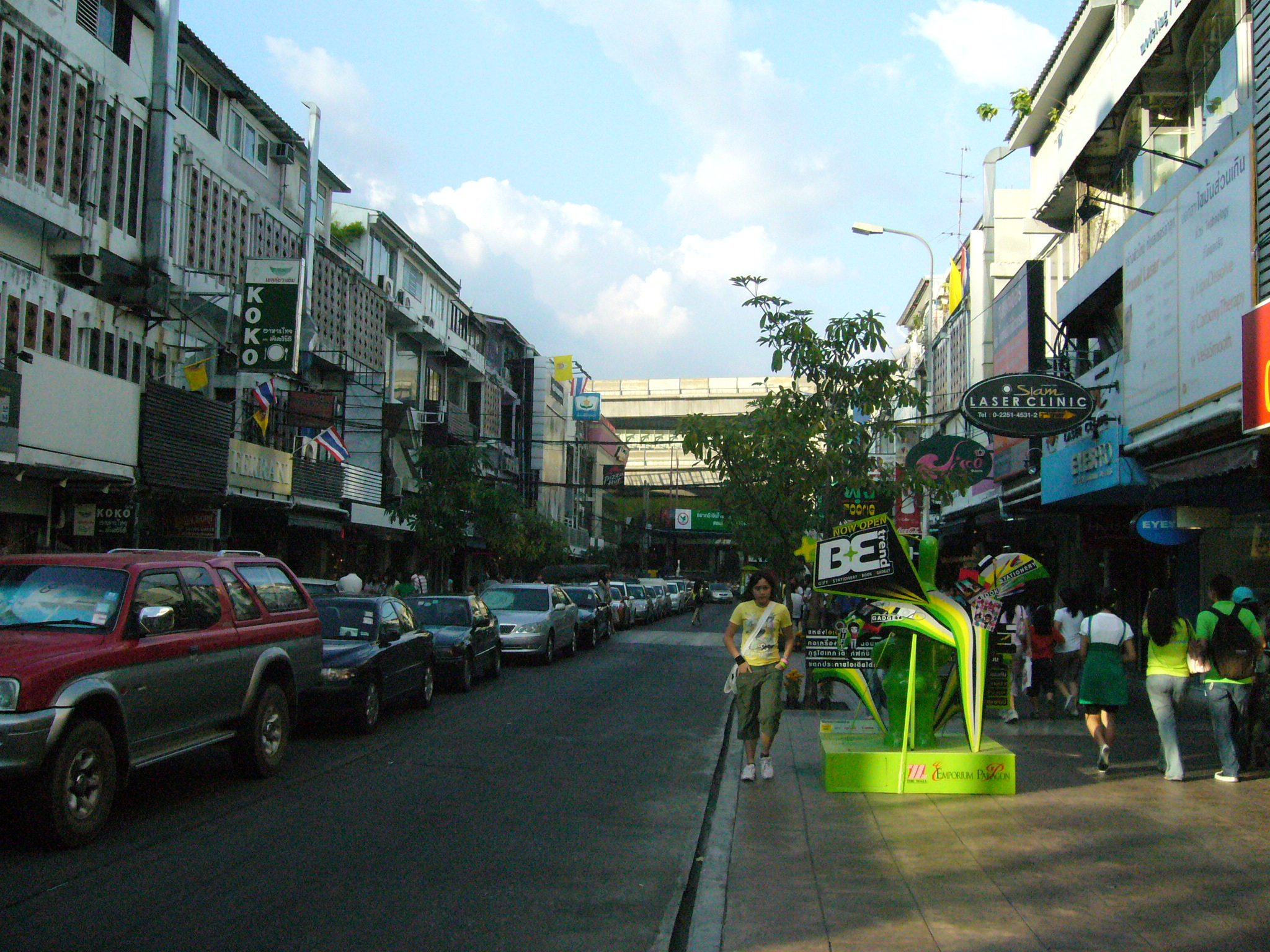
Siam Square Soi 3

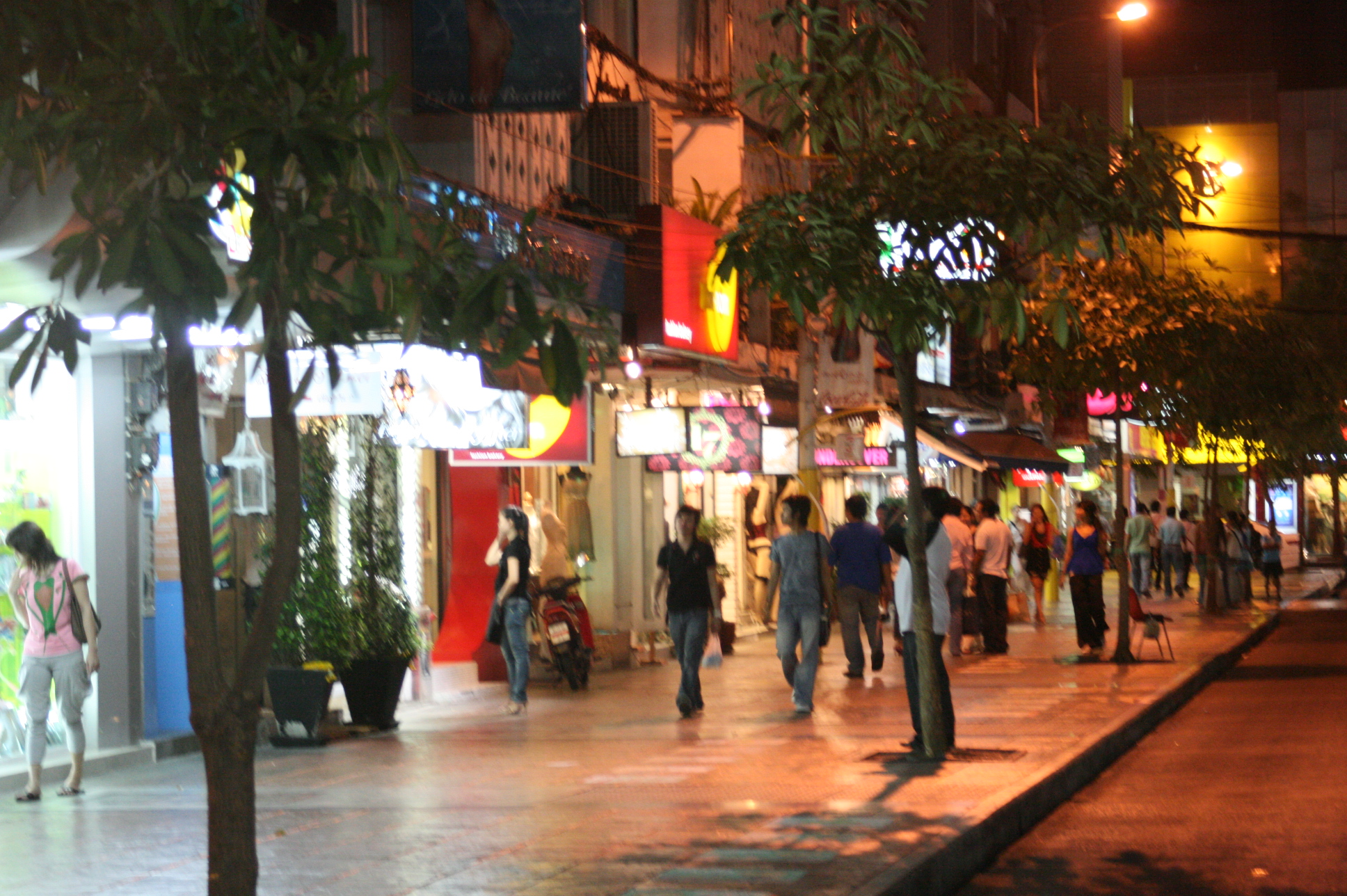
Footpath in Siam Square

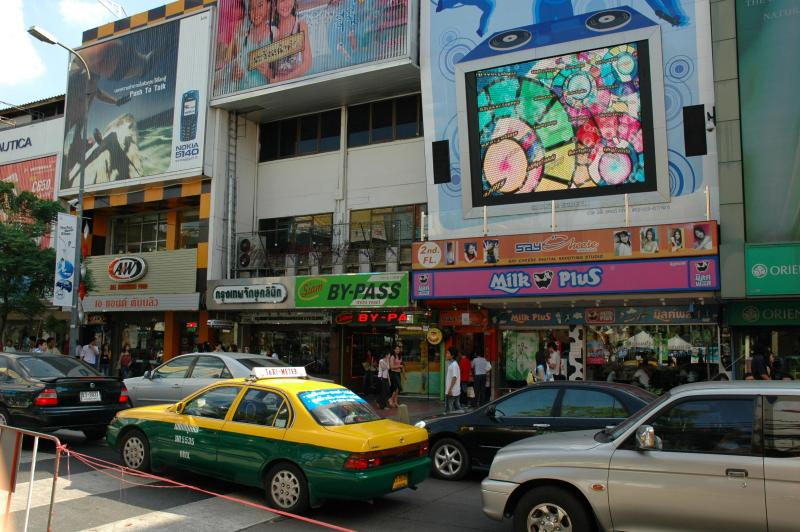
Main road in Siam Square Area

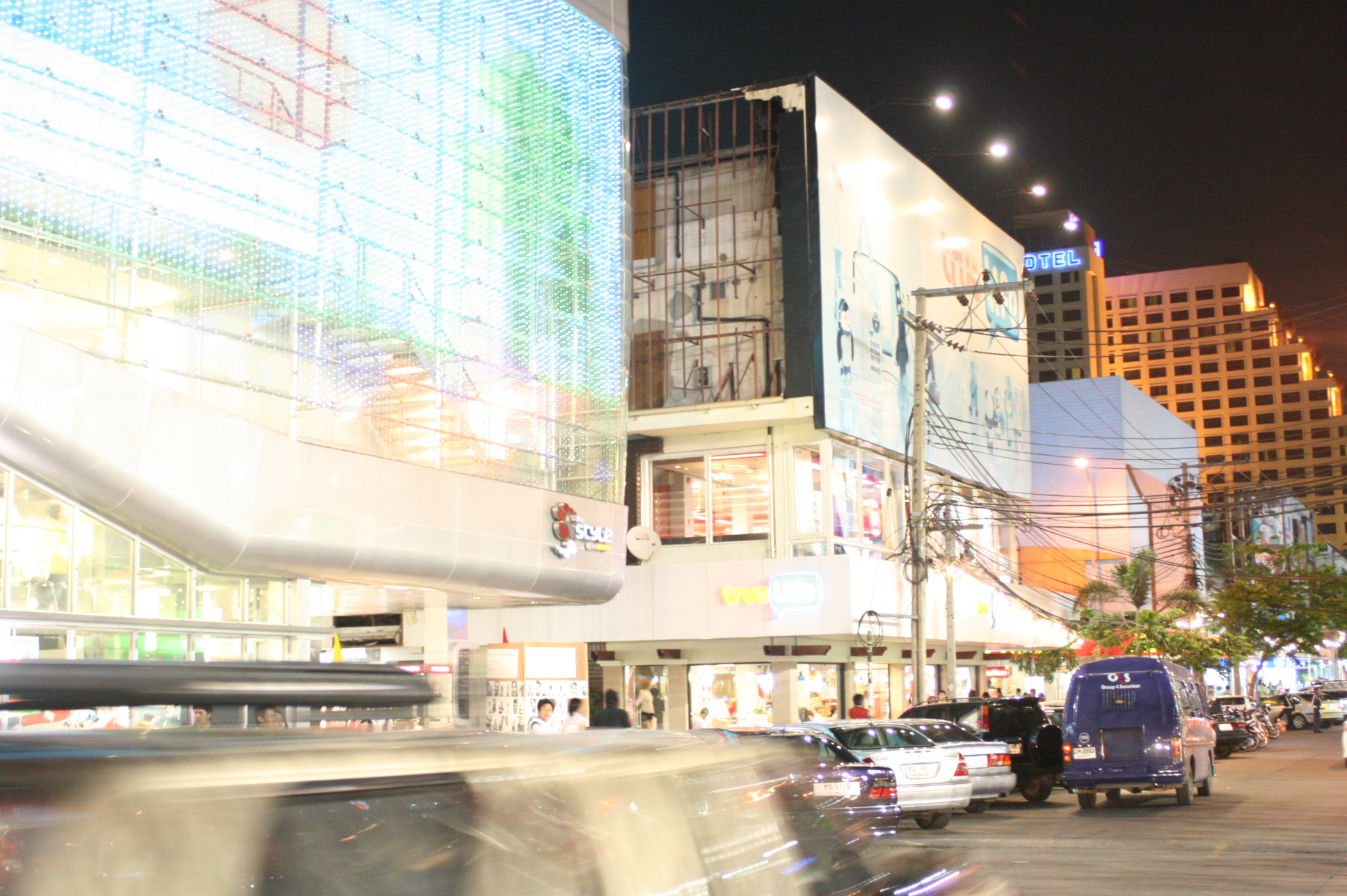
Main road in Siam Square Area

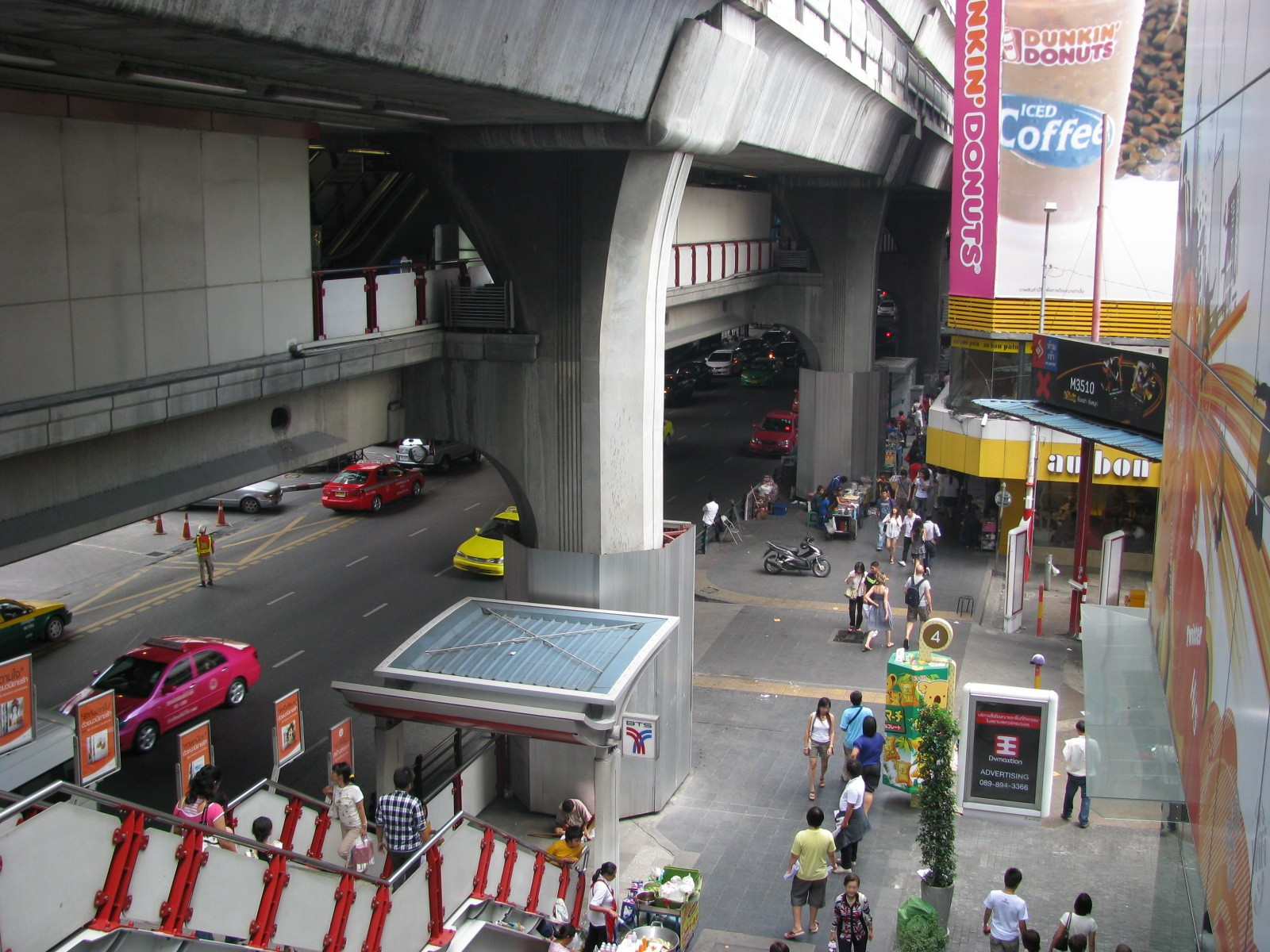
Near Siam BTS station

== Location ==
The area is located at the corner of Phayathai Road and Rama I Road, prominently in front of Siam BTS station, which can be considered as the center of Bangkok.

=== Transportation ===
Due to its location in the heart of Bangkok, many means of transportation are available.

==== BTS stations ====
Aside from Siam station, Siam Square is close to National Stadium BTS station and Chit Lom BTS station.

==== Bus ====
There are several bus lines that pass through Siam Square, with five soi having bus stops.

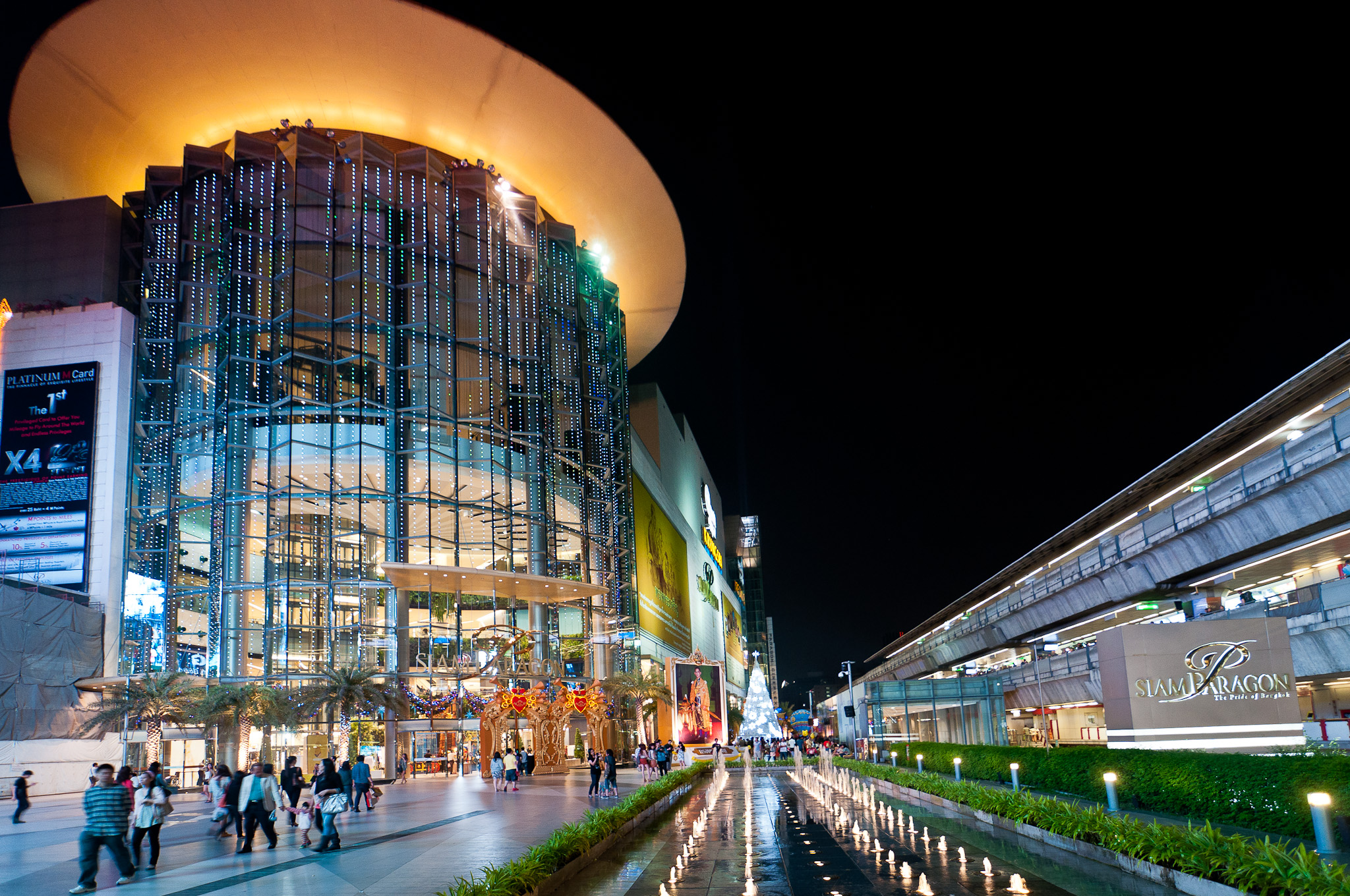
Siam Paragon

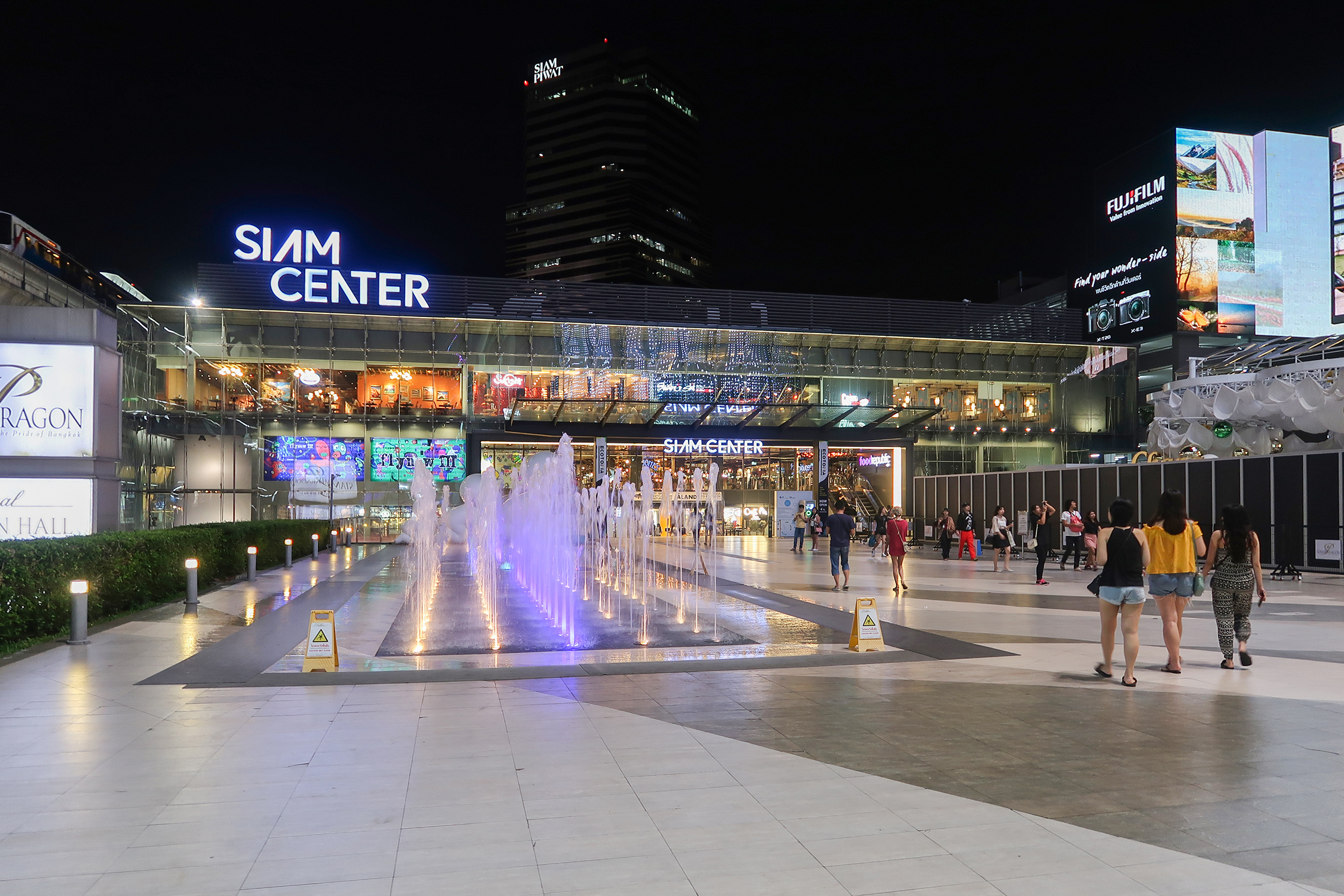
Siam Center

==== Skywalk ====
A skywalk Begins at National Stadium BTS station, passing by Siam BTS station and connecting to Chit Lom BTS station. It connects to various shopping malls; all of the following can be reached by skywalk:

- Siam Square One (In the Siam Square area.)
- Center Point Siam (In the Siam Square area.)
- Siamkit (In the Siam Square area.)
- SiamScape (In the Siam Square area.)
- Siam Paragon
- Siam Center
- Siam Discovery
- MBK Center
- CentralwOrld
- Gaysorn Village
- The Market Bangkok
- The Platinum Fashion Mall
- Erawan Bangkok
- Amarin
- Central Chidlom
- Central Embassy

== Popular attractions ==
Siam Square is a composite of many different entertainment options. From Cinemas, and bowling alleys to aquarium and museum. This area has it all, due to the advantage of being connected to many other popular places that can easily be reached with a skywalk. Siam Square is like the center of shopping and entertainment in Thailand. These are some of the most popular attractions.

=== Sea Life Bangkok Ocean World (Siam Paragon) ===
One of the largest aquariums in Southeast Asia. With the size of 3 Olympic pools and over 30,000 marine animals from across the world.

=== Wat Pathum Wanaram ===
The temple was built by King Rama IV in 1857 as a place of worship. This place is a rare example of ancient craftsmanship featuring ornate stencils and lacquered sculptures.

=== Madame Tussauds (Siam Discovery Center) ===
A wax museum with 10 exhibit rooms of lifelike wax figures, based on real life.

=== Bangkok Art and Culture Centre (BACC) ===
An art center with the widest range of contemporary art, design, music, theatre, and film in Bangkok. It regularly hosts changing exhibitions from both Thai and International artists.

Working Hours: Sunday Monday Tuesday Wednesday Thursday Friday Saturday 10:00am–10:00pm

== Cinemas ==
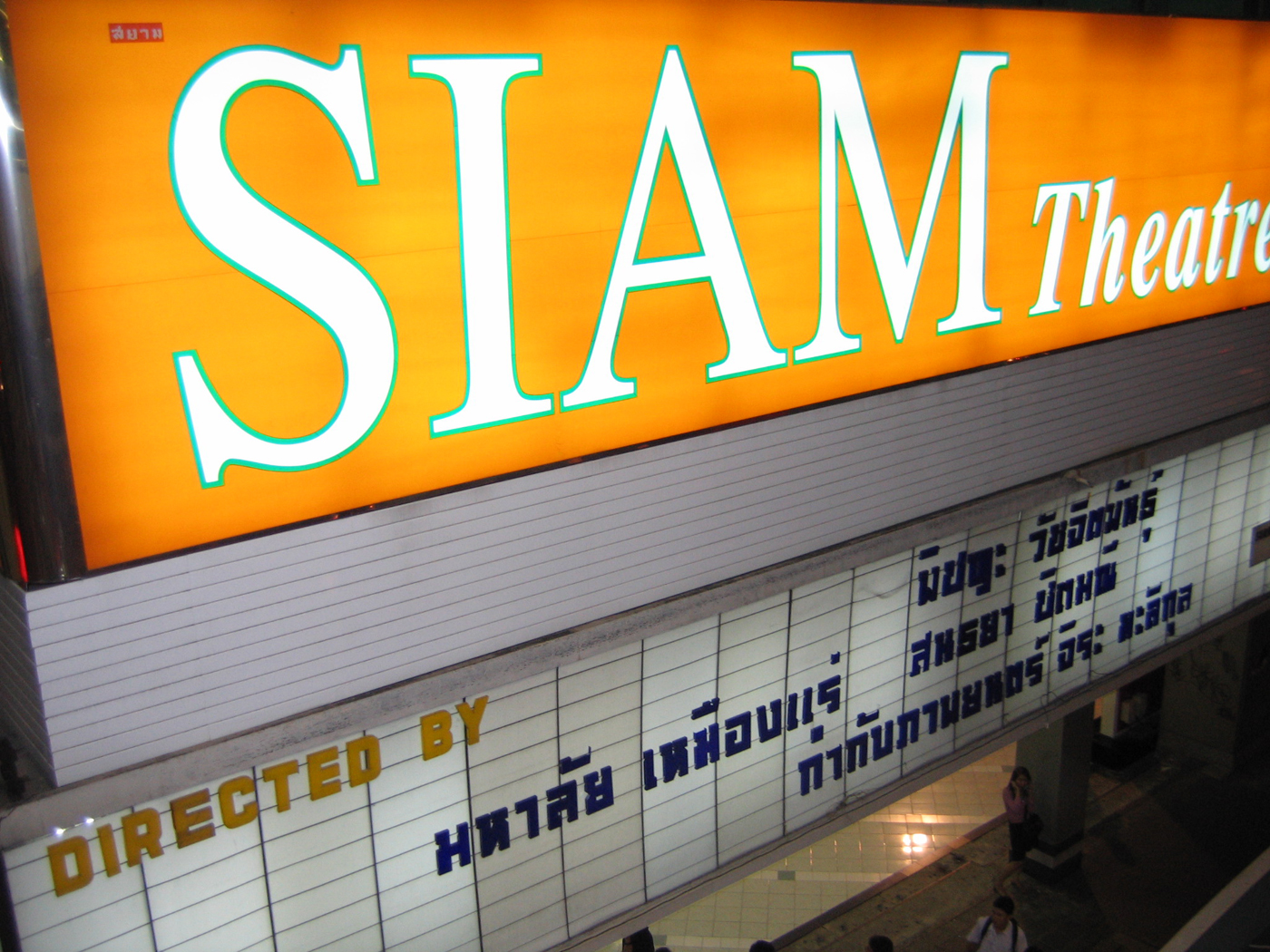
The Siam Theatre.

- The Siam – Opened in 1966, it stayed in operation for 44 years until it burned down during the 2010 Thai military crackdown, It was demolished a year later. The site has since been replaced with Siam Square One Shopping Center.
- Lido Theater – Opened in 1968 as a standalone, it was converted into a 3-screen cinema in 1994 before closing down for renovations in June 2018 which saw 2 of the 3 theatres repurposed for other uses. It often runs independent films not screened elsewhere in Bangkok. Concerts and other events are occasionally held here. It now operates a small-scale shopping center under the name Lido Connect.
- Scala Cinema – The 900-seat single-screen cinema opened in 1969, and was considered one of the finest movie houses in Asia. It was the final standalone movie theater in operation before closing in mid-2020 and was demolished by 2021 by its landowner, Chulalongkorn University to make way for re-development. The site, along with the adjacent buildings which were also demolished is still empty as of 2023.

== See also ==
- List of shopping malls in Thailand
- Siam Center
