= Chit Lom BTS station =

Metro station in Bangkok, Thailand

Chit Lom ชิดลม
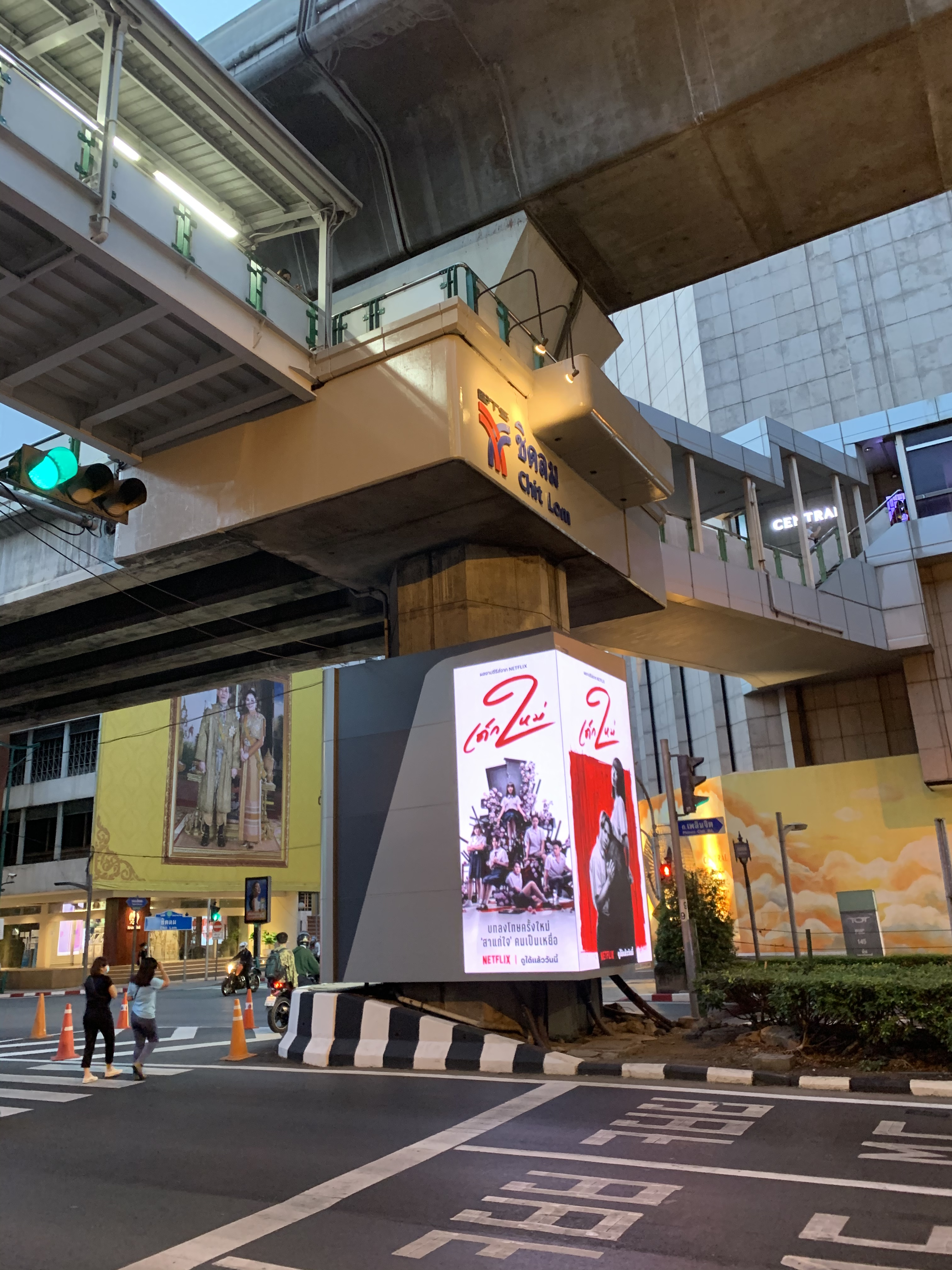

General information
- Location: Pathum Wan; Bangkok; Thailand
- Coordinates: 13°44′38.79″N 100°32′35.15″E
- System: BTS
- Owner: Bangkok Metropolitan Administration (BMA); BTS Rail Mass Transit Growth Infrastructure Fund (BTSGIF)
- Operator: Bangkok Mass Transit System; Public Company Limited (BTSC)
- Line: Sukhumvit Line

Other information
- Station code: E1

History
- Opened: 5 December 1999

Passengers
- 2021: 3,154,058

Services
Preceding station	BTS Skytrain	Following station
Siam towards Khu Khot	Sukhumvit Line	Phloen Chit towards Kheha
Location

Chit Lom Station Traditional sign

Chit Lom station (Thai: สถานีชิดลม, pronounced [sā.tʰǎː.nīː t͡ɕʰít lōm]) is a BTS skytrain station, on the Sukhumvit Line in Pathum Wan District, Bangkok, Thailand. The station is located on Phloen Chit Road at Chit Lom intersection to Lang Suan and Chit Lom Road. It is also linked by Skybridge directly to Central Chidlom department store, and Sky Walk to Ratchaprasong intersection where Central World, Gaysorn Plaza and Erawan Shrine is situated next to Pratunam clothing market within walking distance from the intersection. The Sky Walk also links the station with Siam station, with cluster of luxury shops in Siam Square and Siam Paragon shopping mall.

== See also ==
- Bangkok Skytrain
