= Ratchaprasong =

Intersection and shopping district in Bangkok, Thailand

Coordinates: 13°44′40″N 100°32′24″E

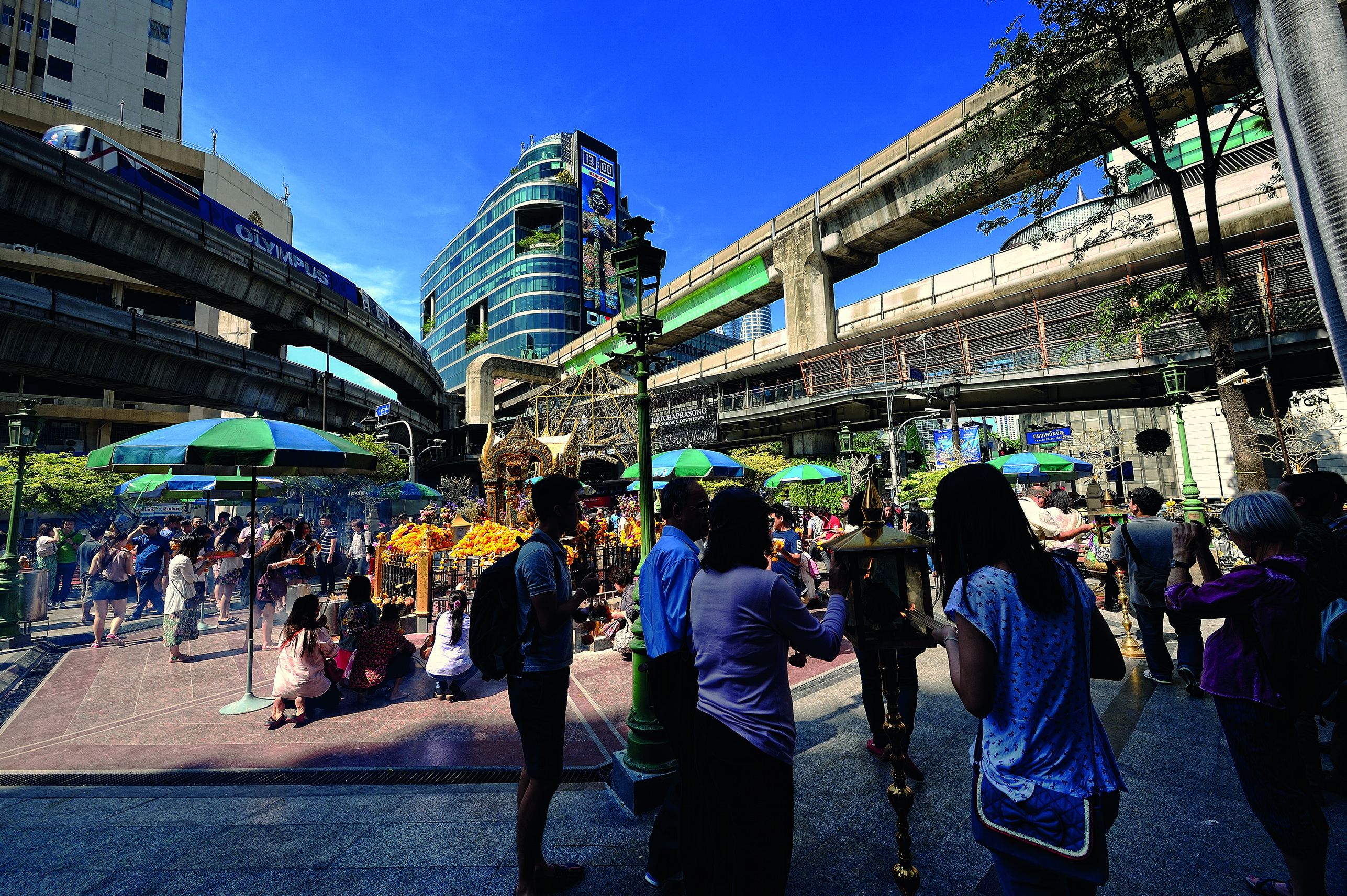
Ratchaprasong junction and the Erawan Shrine, January 2015

Ratchaprasong (light green) adjacent to Siam District (yellow) in Pathum Wan

Ratchaprasong (Thai: ราชประสงค์, pronounced [râːt.t͡ɕʰā.prā.sǒŋ]; also spelled Rajprasong) is the name of an intersection, and a shopping district named after it, in Pathum Wan District, Bangkok, adjacent to the Siam area, at the BTS Skytrain's Chit Lom Station and the intersection of Phloen Chit, Rama I, and Ratchadamri Roads. The area is home to many shopping malls and hotels.

== Attractions ==
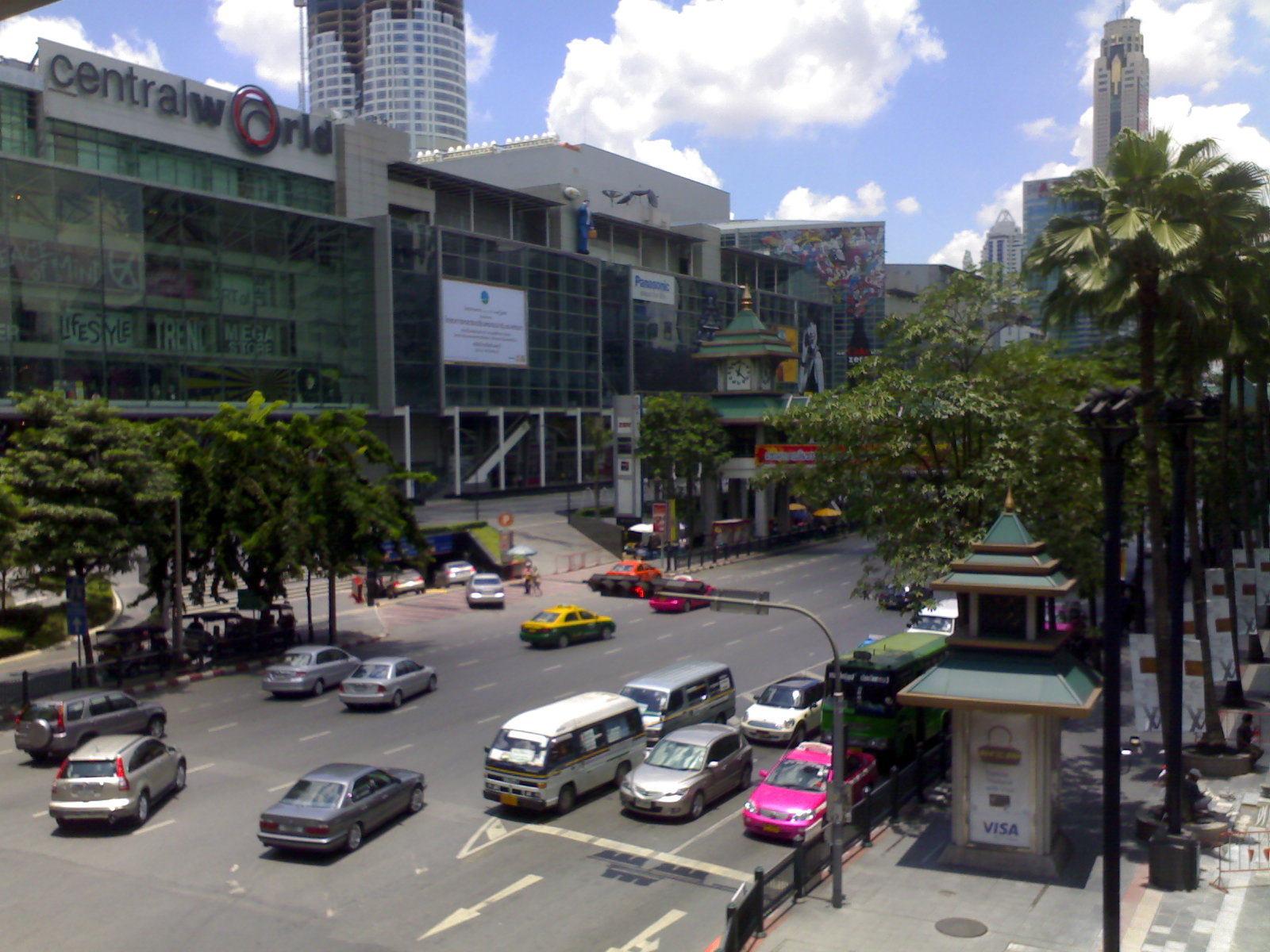
Central World

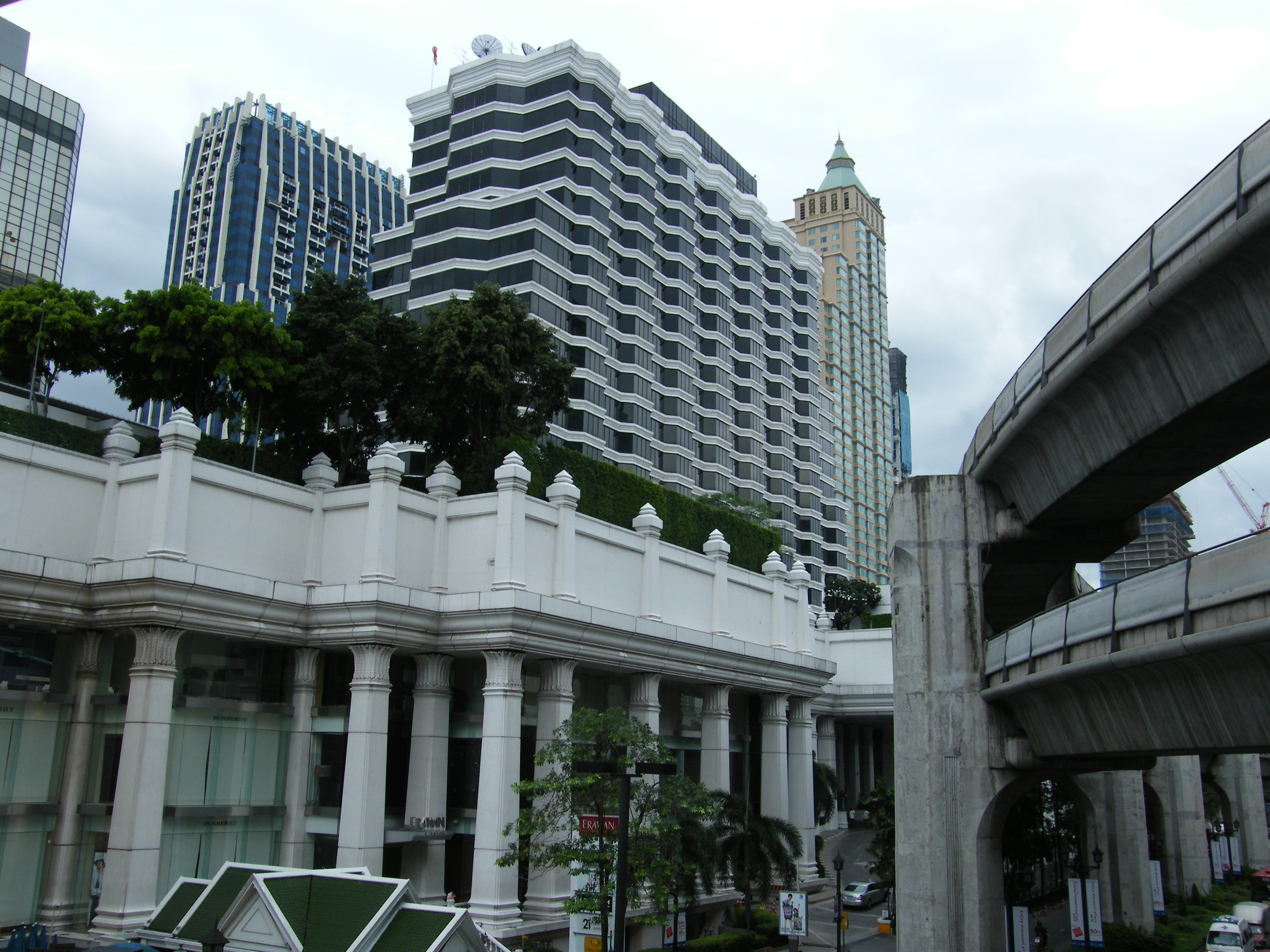
Grand Hyatt Erawan Hotel

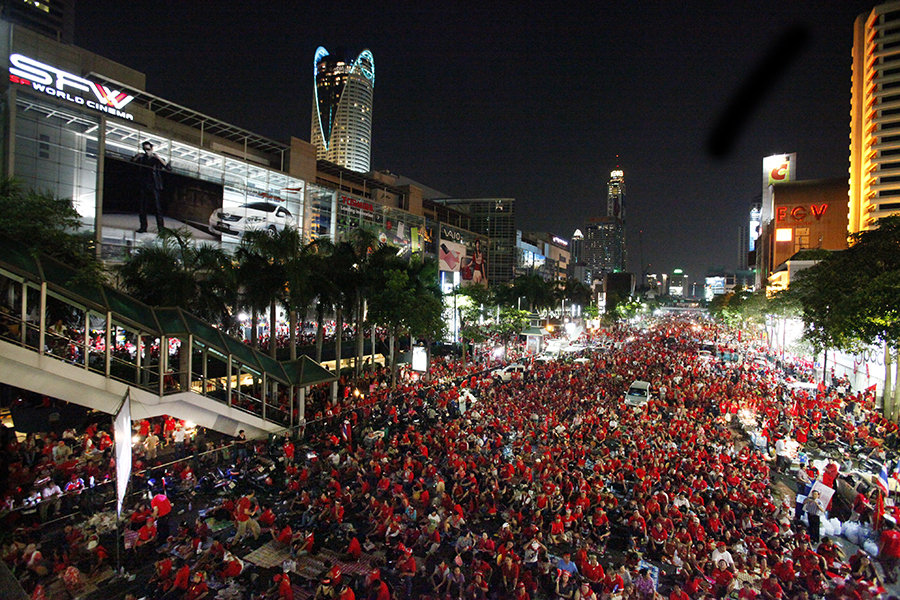
Red Shirts demonstration at the junction (2010)

- Erawan Shrine – A Hindu/Buddhist shrine in Bangkok, Thailand, that houses a statue of four-faced Brahma Sahampati, has regular dance performances put on by a troupe paid by worshippers whose prayers at the shrine were answered.
- Eight other shrines are located in the area as well: Phra Mae Laksami (Lakshmi), Phra Mae Uma (Parvati), Phra Trimurati (Trimurti), Phra Phi Khanet (Ganesh), Phra In (Indra), Phra Narai Song Suban (Narayana riding on garuda), Phra Narai Song Nak (Narayana riding on naga), and Thao Chatulokkaban (Four Heavenly Kings). For Phra Trimurati has long been mistaken for Trimurti, but in 2017 it was revealed that in fact, it is Sadasiva or five-faced Shiva. Sadasiva is worshiped as the god of love. Therefore, there are often many youngers who come to pray for love, especially on Thursday nights at 9:30 p.m. or Valentine's Day. From the presence of nine Hindu shrines, hence, Ratchaprasong is known among Thai people as "Intersection of Gods".
- Festive season lights – Every year around Christmas and New Year, Ratchaprasong is heavily decorated with lights. The decorations were started by The Peninsular Plaza (closed since 1 March 2022) and The Regent hotel (now Four Seasons Hotel Bangkok), and later expanded to Sogo (now a part of Amarin Plaza), CentralWorld, Central Chidlom, and Gaysorn. Bangkok Metropolitan Administration also provides lights along the BTS Skytrain pillars. During the period, it is the brightest lit area of Bangkok.
- Foreign Correspondents' Club Thailand – Located in the penthouse of the Maneeya Building, the FCCT hosts guest speakers, talks on current events, movie screenings, and art and photographic exhibitions.

== Shopping ==
- Central Chidlom – Flagship department store of Thailand's biggest retail chain.
- CentralWorld – Southeast Asia's second largest shopping mall.
- Gaysorn Village – An upscale shopping centre devoted to designer-label luxury goods.
- Gaysorn Amarin – Formerly the Sogo Department Store, has shops devoted to Thai traditional arts and handicrafts as well as restaurants and other retailers.
- Big C Ratchadamri – Has shops, fitness centre, and 10-screen EGV Metropolis cineplex.

== Hotels ==
- Grand Hyatt Erawan – Built on the site of the original Erawan Hotel; also has a shopping arcade
- Holiday Inn Bangkok
- Intercontinental Bangkok – Has connecting bridge to Gaysorn through its President Tower shopping arcade.
- Anantara Siam Bangkok Hotel – Formerly Four Seasons and The Regent Bangkok, at BTS Ratchadamri Station.
- Hansar Hotel, at BTS Ratchadamri Station
- Sawasdee Langsuan Inn (Chit Lom–Sukhumwit) 93/4 Soi Lang Suan 5, Phloen Chit Road, Bangkok.
- Arnoma Hotel, Bangkok

== Transportation ==
- BTS Skytrain
  - Chit Lom Station connects to Central Chidlom, Maneeya Center, Grand Hyatt Erawan, Gaysorn, and CentralWorld. The walkway extends to Siam Station.
  - Ratchadamri Station – a few metres walk to the Four Seasons Hotel Bangkok and Royal Bangkok Sports Club.
- MRT Subway
  - Lumphini Station a few metres walk to Lumphini Park.
  - Si Lom Station a few meters walk to Lumphini Park, Dusit Thani Hotel, and Chulalongkorn Hospital.
  - Sam Yan Station a few meters walk to The Thai Red Cross, Wat Hua Lamphong, and Chulalongkorn University.
  - Hua Lamphong Station connects to Hua Lamphong Central Train Station.
- Khlong Saen Saep Express Boat service – Pratu Nam Pier is nearby.
- BMTA city buses – more than 20 bus lines pass through the area.

== Incidents ==
In 2010, the Ratchaprasong intersection was one of the main sites of the 2010 Thai political protests. From March to May the Red Shirt protesters occupied a large area around Ratchaprasong intersection in civil disobedience aimed at reinstalling the government under Thaksin Shinawatra. The stage area and the surrounding tent city became known as "the red city". The major shopping malls and five star hotels in the vicinity were forced to close during the occupation. Most residents of the area moved out for security concerns and because of the inconvenience.

After weeks of failed negotiations, the Thai army moved in to clear the Ratchaprasong intersection on 19 May 2010. The violent government crackdown against the "Red Shirt" protesters resulted in the deaths of about 90 civilians and soldiers. Buildings in the area were set on fire as the military moved into the intersection area; this resulted in the partial destruction of Bangkok's largest shopping mall, the CentralWorld complex. Some Red Shirt protesters were accused of setting the fire and tried for arson but were acquitted. As of June 2012, reconstruction at the Ratchaprasong intersection is complete.

In 2014, there were demonstrations protesting Yingluck Shinawatra's government.

In August 2015, a bomb exploded at the Ratchaprasong intersection killing twenty people and injuring 125.

The area once again saw demonstrations during the 2020–2021 Thai protests.

== See also ==
- Siam Square – another adjacent shopping area
