= 2015 Bangkok bombing =

2015 terrorist attack in Thailand

Coordinates: 13.74444°N 100.54056°E

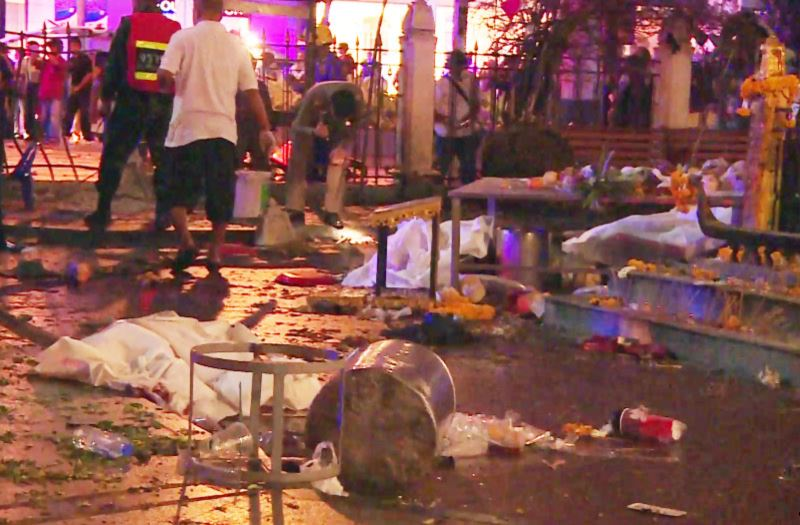
- Erawan Shrine after the explosion

- 2015 Bangkok bombing (Bangkok)
- Location: Ratchaprasong intersection, Pathum Wan district, Bangkok, Thailand
- Date: 17 August 2015; 18:55 ICT (UTC+07:00)
- Attack type: Bombing; mass murder
- Weapon: Pipe bomb filled with TNT
- Deaths: 20
- Injuries: 125
- Perpetrator: Grey Wolves (suspected)
- Assailants: Adem Karadağ; Mieraili Yusufu

On 17 August 2015, a bombing took place inside the Erawan Shrine at the Ratchaprasong intersection in Pathum Wan district, Bangkok, Thailand, killing 20 people and injuring 125. Thai police were reported to have arrested two Uyghur suspects with associations to the Turkish ultra-nationalistic organization Grey Wolves, the second of whom confessed to having been the bomber. He later retracted his confession. In 2026, both defendants were convicted and sentenced to death.

== Prior incidents ==
Prior to this bombing incident, there were two other bombings in Thailand in the same year. In February 2015, two bombs exploded on the Siam BTS Station outside the nearby Siam Paragon shopping mall, injuring three people. The attack was believed to have been politically motivated. In April 2015, a car bomb exploded in Ko Samui, injuring seven.

== Attack ==
On 17 August 2015, at 18:55 ICT (11:55 UTC), a bomb exploded inside the grounds of the Erawan Shrine, near the busy Ratchaprasong Intersection in Bangkok's city centre. The Royal Thai Police said that 3 kilograms (6.6 lb) of TNT had been stuffed in a pipe bomb and left under a bench near the outer rim of the grounds surrounding the shrine, and that an electronic circuit suspected to have been used in the attack was found 30 metres (98 ft) from the scene. Surveillance footage showed a suspect leaving a backpack at the scene shortly before the explosion.

No one has yet claimed responsibility for the attack. The attacks are thought to have targeted Thailand's tourism and economy, but there has been a range of inconsistencies in the statements of Thai authorities about those arrested and the reasons for the attack. The Thai government has at times suggested the bombers acted to avenge a crackdown on their human trafficking network, to take revenge for Thailand's deportation of a group of Uyghurs back to China in July 2015, to strike a blow for the insurgents fighting the Thai government in the deep south, or for reasons related to Thailand's domestic politics. The government has implicated a range of other suspects in the bombing, mostly Thai opponents of the military regime.

The site of the bombing had been cleaned, and the crater paved over with cement, by 19 August.

=== Second incident ===
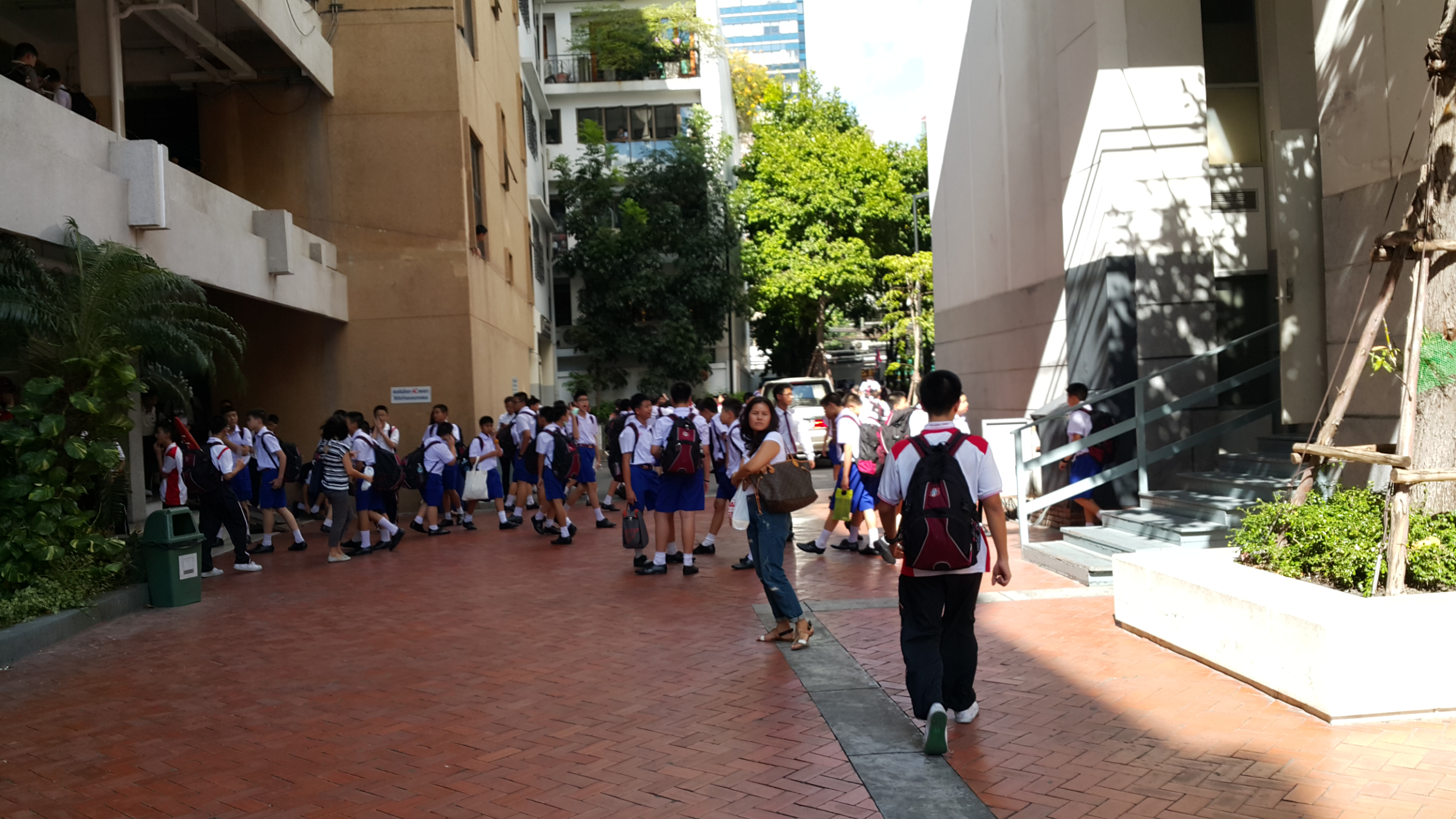
Students of Assumption College being evacuated shortly after the explosion at the next-by Sathon pier

In a separate attack in Bangkok, an explosive device was thrown from a bridge near a boat pier shortly after 13:30 ICT on 18 August 2015, but it caused no injuries. The device, possibly a grenade, appeared to have been thrown to the busy Sathon pier under the Taksin Bridge in Bangkok but landed in water of Chao Phraya river by the Saphan Taksin BTS station where it exploded. The district's deputy police chief said, "If it did not fall in the water then it certainly would have caused injuries." Some damage was done to the bridge.

== Victims ==
Casaulties by nationality
Nation	Deaths	Injuries
Thailand	6	60
China (Note: Includes one British national resident in Hong Kong)	7	36
Malaysia	5	2
Indonesia	1	1
Singapore	1	3
Austria	—N/a	2
Japan	—N/a	1
Maldives	—N/a	2
Mali	—N/a	1
Oman	—N/a	2
Philippines	—N/a	2
Qatar	—N/a	1
Taiwan	—N/a	3
Unknown nationality	—N/a	25
Total	20	163
Some victims had multiple citizenships.

Most of the victims of the explosion were tourists visiting the shrine. The Royal Thai Police reported that 20 people died and 125 had been injured.

The dead included six Thais, five Malaysians, five mainland Chinese, two from Hong Kong (including one British national resident in Hong Kong), one Indonesian, and one Singaporean. In addition, citizens of Austria, China, Hong Kong, Indonesia, Japan, Malaysia, Mali, the Maldives, Oman, the Philippines, Qatar, Singapore and Taiwan were among those injured.

All of the 14 non-Thai fatalities, from Malaysia, China, Hong Kong, Indonesia and Singapore, were ethnic Chinese.

== Reward ==
Police offered a one million baht reward for information leading to the arrest of the bomber. On 20 August this was increased to two million baht by an anonymous Thai businessman, and later to three million baht (US$84,000). A further two million baht (US$56,000) was offered by a prominent member of the Red Shirt movement and another two million by Panthongtae Shinawatra, son of former prime minister Thaksin Shinawatra, as well as five million baht (US$140,000) for "those officials who investigate and make arrests". On 31 August, national police chief Somyot Poompanmoung awarded the three million baht to members of the police whose work led to the arrest of a suspect in the bombings. This suspect later confessed to being the individual seen on CCTV in the first bombing. One million baht came from police chief Somyot and the rest came from his friends. At the end of September 2015, police awarded themselves a second reward, essentially for making substantial progress in the investigation.

== Investigation ==
Investigators said they were "certain" that a man shown leaving a backpack at the scene of the explosion was responsible for the blast. The security camera footage, which has been broadcast internationally, shows the man in shorts and a yellow T-shirt taking off a dark-coloured backpack while sitting on a bench and then standing up, putting the backpack underneath the bench and walking away while looking at his phone. The suspect likely had arrived by tuk-tuk from an alley near Hua Lamphong.

Some newspapers alleged that the man captured on security footage at the Erawan Shrine bomb attack was named by authorities as Mohamad Museyin, and that investigators are focusing their efforts on budget hotels in the Sathon Road area of Bangkok where they believe the suspect stayed. However, this information was quickly dismissed by Thai authorities.

Thailand's chief of police said the attack was carried out by a network and released a sketch of the "unidentified foreign man" who was identified in CCTV footage as being the bomber. A warrant was issued for his arrest the same day the reward was announced. Police are also saying that two other people, wearing red and white T-shirts, seen in the same footage were being treated as suspects. These two suspected accomplices were later identified and cleared by police. Police said that the bombing was not international terrorism, but said that it involved several teams and at least 10 people. Military junta leader Prayut Chan-o-cha warned against speculating about the reason for the bombing too soon as, "It could affect international affairs".

A taxi driver later confirmed that he picked up the suspect, and described him as "not in a hurry. He seemed to be calm, like a regular customer, and not Thai. He also spoke in an unclear language on the way."

Video from shortly after the first bombing showed someone in a blue shirt kicking an item into the canal where the second explosion occurred the next day. On 27 August, an arrest warrant was issued for this unnamed individual.

On 29 August 2015, police arrested a 28-year-old man in connection to the bombing. He is not believed to have been the bomber but is suspected of involvement. His nationality was unknown but he had a fake Turkish passport, as well as at least 11 other Turkish passports and over 200 passports in all in his apartment, along with bomb-making components. The Turkish embassy in Bangkok denied that the bomb suspect arrested by Thai police and troops on Saturday was a citizen of Turkey. A second foreigner was detained near the Cambodian border on 1 September, and authorities planned to conduct DNA tests using DNA found on taxis the bomber used.

On 30 August, authorities raided an apartment building in Bangkok, initially telling reporters nothing suspicious had been found. However, on 31 August the authorities announced in a special broadcast that more bomb-making materials had been found and issued arrest warrants for 26-year-old Wanna Suansan, who is living in Turkey, and a foreign male named Jusuf. A photo of a suicide vest was displayed but authorities denied it was connected to the bombing.

Thai authorities state that the bombings were carried out by the Pan-Turkic Turkish ultra-nationalist organization Grey Wolves in retaliation for Thailand's deportation of Uyghur terrorist suspects back to China instead of allowing them to travel to Turkey for asylum. A Chinese ethnic Uyghur man, Adem Karadağ, was arrested by the Thai police in connection with the bombing after fake Turkish passports and bomb-making materials were found in his apartment.

The arrested suspect confessed to Thai authorities that he came from Turkey and travelled to Vietnam on a fake passport, and then travelled through Laos and Cambodia, paying bribes to Thai border police in Sa Kaeo to cross the border from Cambodia. He is believed to have provided Uyghurs with fake passports to go to Turkey.

Adem Karadağ, 31, was identified as the bomber on 26 September while being held in police custody, based on his own confession as well as other evidence.

== Trial ==
In February 2016, Karadağ, also known as Bilal Mohammed, retracted his earlier confession that his lawyer said was a result of torture. His co-defendant, Mieraili Yusufu, 26, also denied the charges. The Military Court has set 20–22 April 2016 for the inspection of evidence. In 2018, it was estimated that it could take several more years for the trial of the suspects to be wrapped up.

The progress in trials have been criticised for being slow. A court observer report from a 2017 trial cited a lawyer's notion that the trial is likely to end as late as 2022.

The trials continued in January 2020.

On 22 November 2022, the court resumed the trial of the "two members of China’s Muslim Uyghur minority" since the suspension of the court proceedings due to the COVID-19.

On 7 November 2024, the court acquitted Wanna Suansan of involvement in the bombing due to insufficient evidence.

=== Final verdict ===
On 11 June 2026, the Bangkok South Criminal Court sentenced both Karadağ and Yusufu to death.

== Motivations ==
Many theories were raised as to what the motivation could have been. Initial suspects were of varying degree of Islamic terrorism, from domestic separatist movement in South Thailand to possible involvement of international groups associated with the Islamic State terrorism. The official press briefs changed as the investigation progressed. It was initially the Muslim Uyghur retaliation, a highly doubted suggestion that was later dropped. A month later, it was hinted by the police to be associated with former prime minister Thaksin Shinawatra and the people-smuggling operators. However, no official confirmation has been announced concerning the motivation and the suspects are still in custody, facing slow series of trials as of 2022, six years later.

Former National Intelligence Agency director-general Bhumarat Taksadipong believed it was carried out by a radical domestic political group and strongly opposed the accused Uyghur involvement.

=== Uyghurs theory ===
Mainstream reports cited the attack as a retaliation on Thailand's decision on deporting the Muslim Uyghur immigrants back to China. It was in July, a month prior to the bombing, that Thai government deported more than a hundred of the Muslim minorities. The action was condemned by international human right groups and the US government, as well as infuriated many Turks. The consulate of Thailand in Istanbul was attacked the following day alongside the Chinese counterpart. The Thai embassy later issued a recommendation that its citizens in Turkey shall refrain from displaying symbols of Thailand in public. Then Thai prime minister Prayut Chan-o-cha justified the deportation stating that Thailand has been offering asylums for the Uyghurs for so long, now it no longer affords to take care of the Uyghur children", ending the press interview with an infuriating tone.

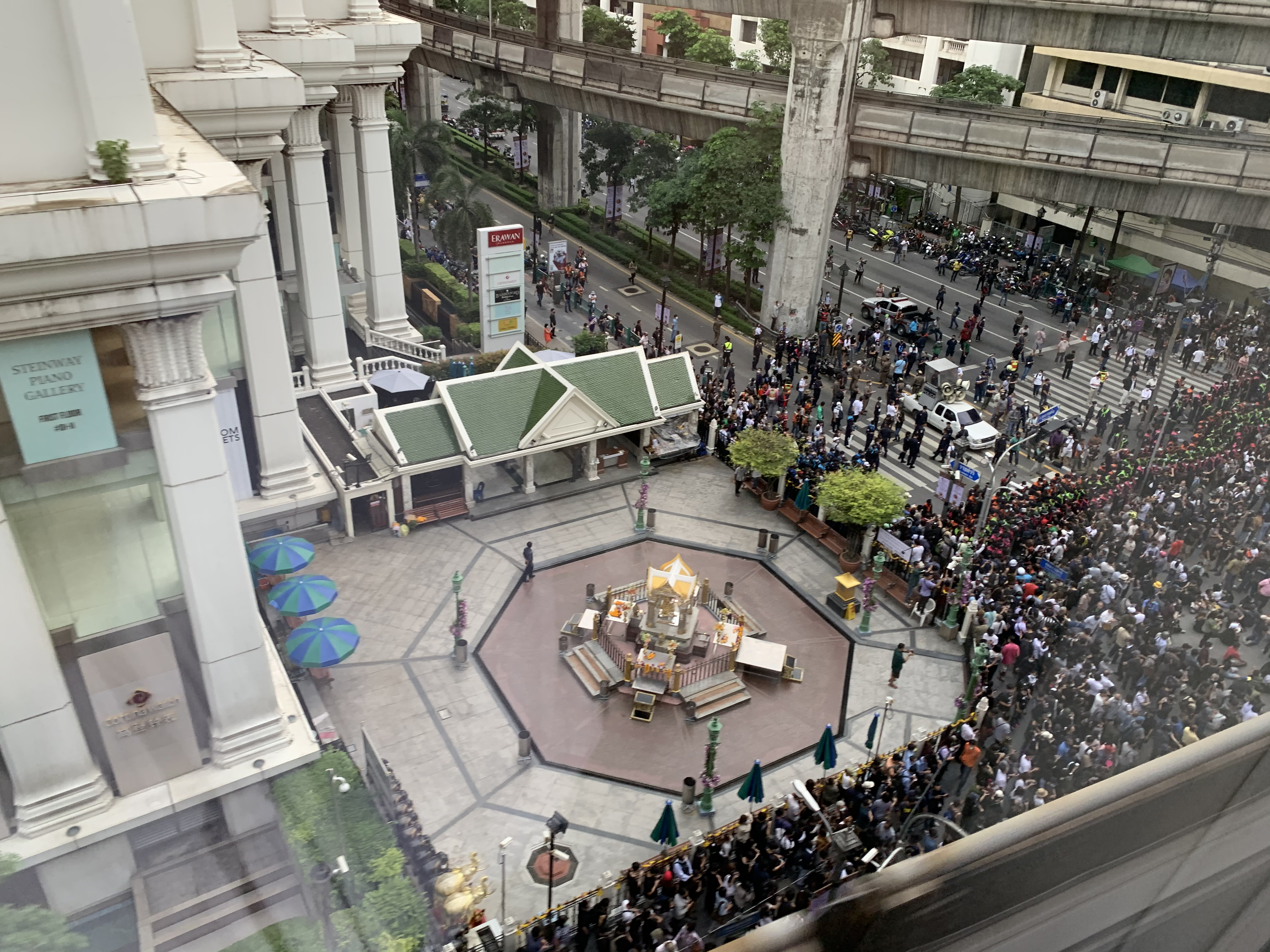
A pro-democracy demonstration at Ratchaprasong in 2020 with the Erawan Shrine visible - a similar gathering here in 2021 featured an Uyghur flag and was condemned by those who think Uyghurs were accountable for the 2015 bombing here.

As the suspects were officially declared to be Muslims associating with the Turkish and Uyghur communities, the theory gained traction, alongside the speculation of that the site - Erawan Shrine - is a place of worship that goes against the Muslim aniconist practice. The accusation was later dropped a few days later by the authority in favor of a "local insurgency". Bangkok-based security analyst Anthony Davis supported the Uyghur possibility. He believed the attack was carried out by nationalist Turkish terrorists who were as well responsible for the attacks on Thai consulate in Istanbul a month earlier. Some members of the Thai public still believe it was the Uyghurs. As recent as 2021, in the wake of pro-democracy protests, protesters waving an Uyghur flag while demonstrating in the Ratchaprasong vicinity were condemned by opposers for supporting the same separatists that "terrorized" the very intersection in 2015.

The accusation on Uyghurs have been doubted by many experts, including Former National Intelligence Agency director-general Bhumarat Taksadipong. Thai expert on critical terrorism studies Kridikorn Wongsawangpanit criticised the government for confidently blaming the Uyghurs too early. "It was so early that [I am] certain that there no way they [the government] could have collected enough evidences and analyzed in this short period of time," he added. Vorasakdi Mahatdhanobol, then Director of Chinese Studies Center at Chulalongkorn University denied this accusation as it was "a too simple decision" for the perpetuators which only "have negatively affected the Uyghurs".

=== Domestic actors ===
Wongsawangpanit listed the junta, who came into power from the 2014 Thai coup, among the likeliest suspects. In a BBC News report, Thai political expert Pavin Chachavalpongpun claimed that the junta "could be taking advantage of this situation to assert its legitimacy and justify staying in power longer". A similar notion was similarly nodded by Wongsawangpanit.

Police commissioner-general Somyot Poompanmoung hinted the attack was of an "internal insurgency". This was believed to be implying to either the Red Shirts political group associated with former prime minister Thaksin Shinawatra, or the South Thailand separatists.

== Reactions ==
Thai military junta leader Prayut Chan-o-cha called it the "worst-ever attack" on his country, saying, "there have been minor bombs or just noise, but this time they aim for innocent lives. They want to destroy our economy, our tourism."

The foreign ministry announced that mostly Western countries issued travel warnings. Twelve countries—Austria, Belgium, Denmark, France, Japan, Malaysia, Singapore, South Korea, Sweden, Switzerland, Taiwan, and the United States—issued "Level 2" advisories urging citizens to take extra care during trips to the country. Nine others—Australia, Canada, China, Germany, Italy, Ireland, New Zealand, Russia, and the United Kingdom—recommended a higher degree of caution, or "Level 3" warnings. Hong Kong advised its people to avoid non-essential travel to Thailand, or "Level 4" warning. The Netherlands instructed its people to be alert, or a "Level 1 warning."

== Effect on economy ==
Malaysia Airlines reported that there were no flight cancellations to Bangkok. After Hong Kong raised its travel advisory for Bangkok to "red alert", which prevented the purchase of compulsory travel insurance, the number of tourists from major Asian markets dropped by 10%. Hong Kong downgraded its travel advisory to amber on 22 September.
