= Gaysorn Village =

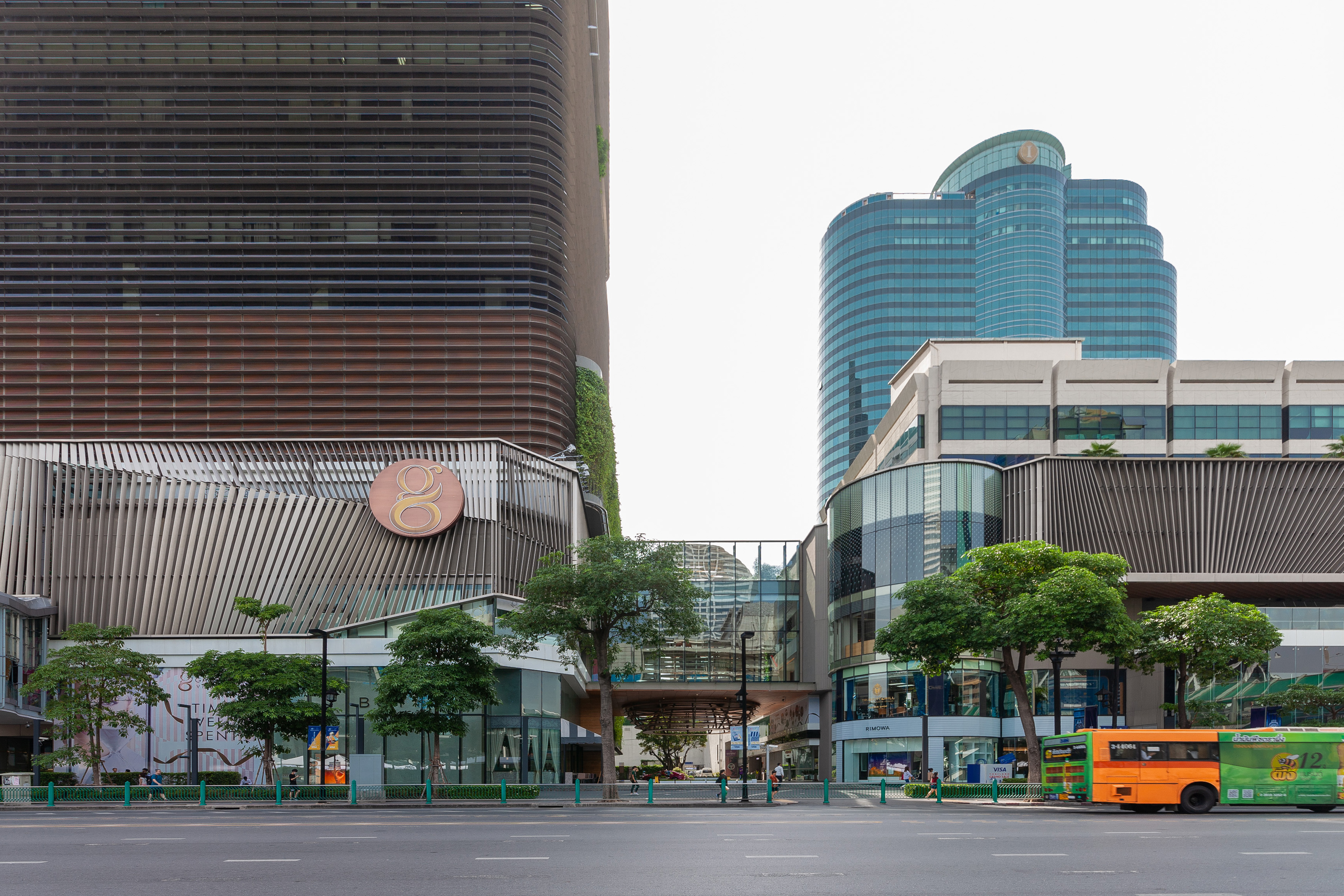
- Gaysorn Tower (left) and Gaysorn Village (right)

General information
- Location: 999 Phloen Chit Road, Lumphini, Pathum Wan District, Bangkok, Thailand
- Coordinates: 13.745887°N 100.540729°E
- Opening: October 16, 1994
- Owner: Gaysorn Property

Technical details
- Floor area: Gaysorn Shopping Centre 41,500 sqm Gaysorn Tower 63,000 sqm Amarin Plaza including Amarin Tower 76,000 sqm

Website
- www.gaysornvillage.com

Gaysorn Village is a building complex in the Ratchaprasong area of Bangkok. It also includes the Gaysorn Tower, an office tower block, and the Amarin Plaza shopping centre.

The shopping mall building has five levels with more than 100 shops over an area of 12,600 square metres. The basement has parking for 416 cars, doorman and valet parking service. Gaysorn is managed by Gaysorn Land Asset Management Co., Ltd., a partnership between by Gaysorn Group & Hongkong Land Limited. Gaysorn Shopping Centre is a part of Ratchaprasong Shopping district in Bangkok.

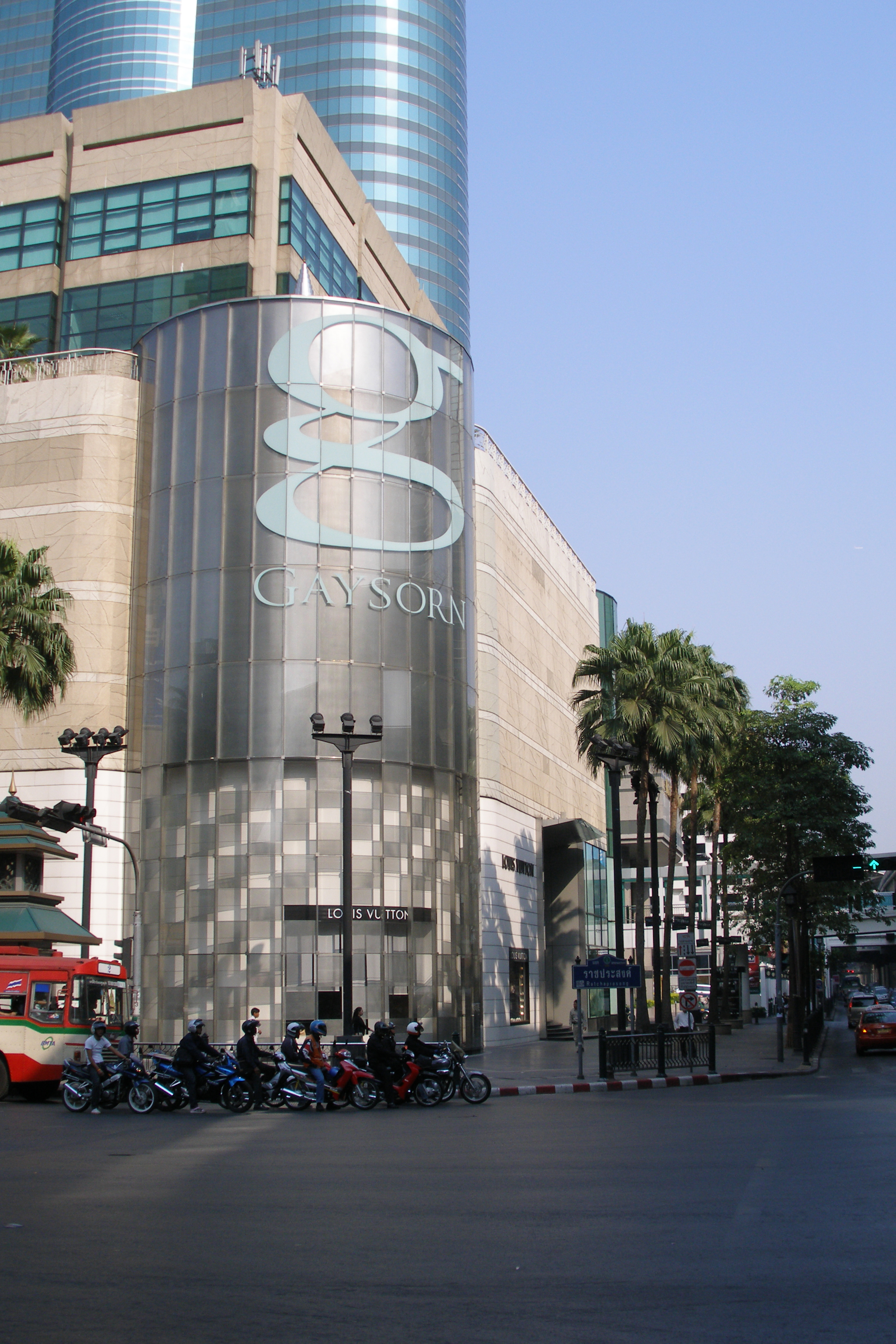
Gaysorn

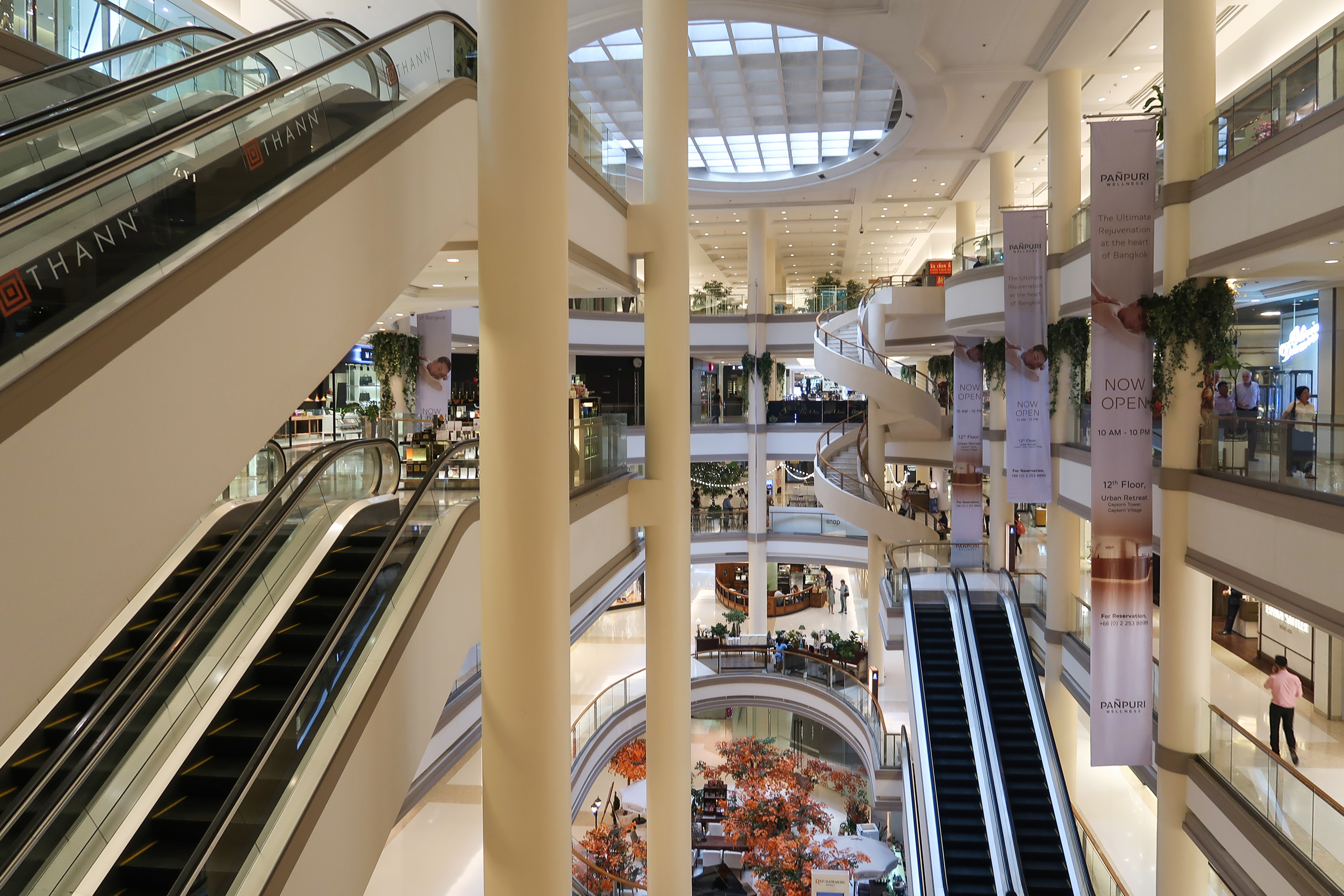
Gaysorn Atrium Gallery

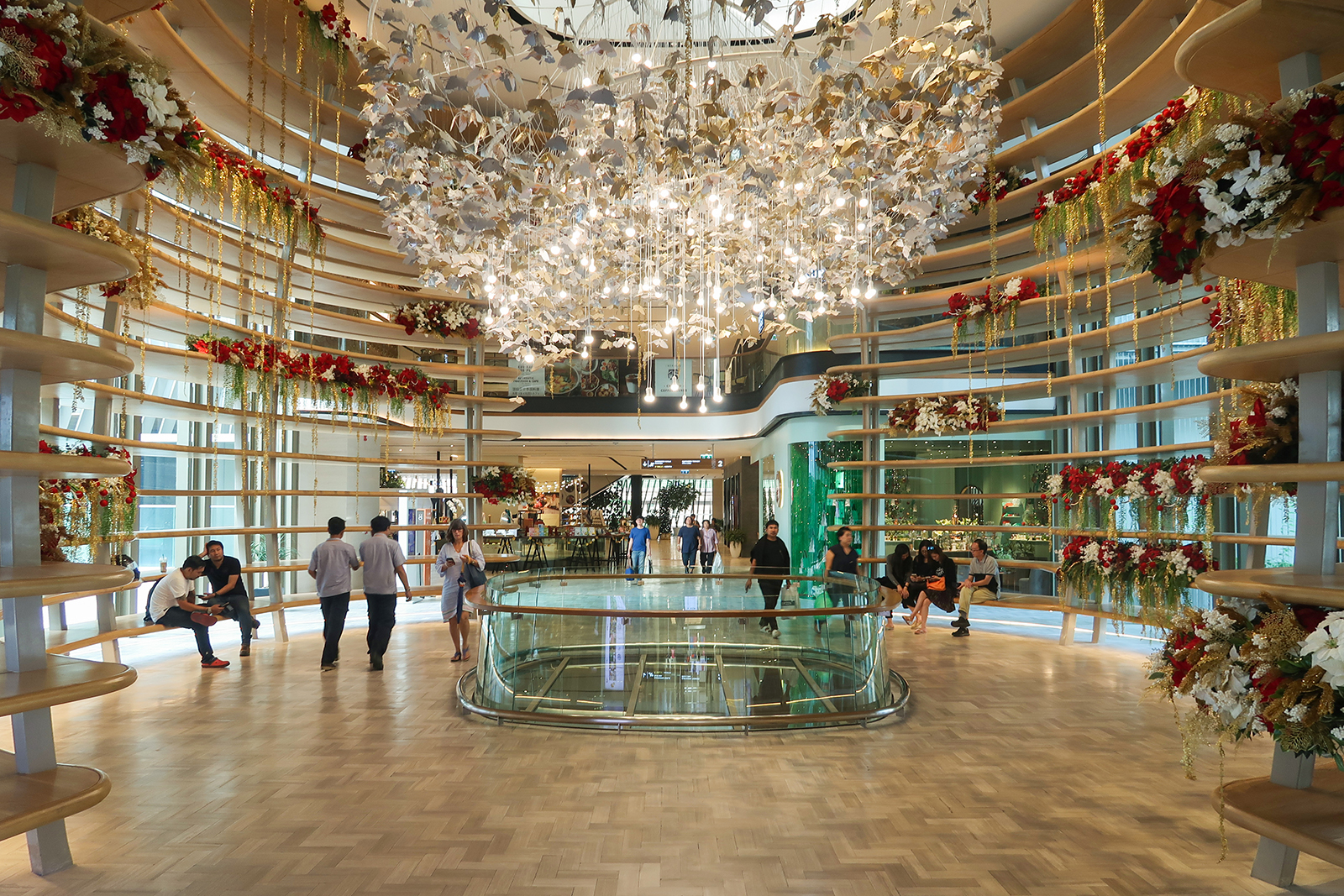
Gaysorn Cocoon

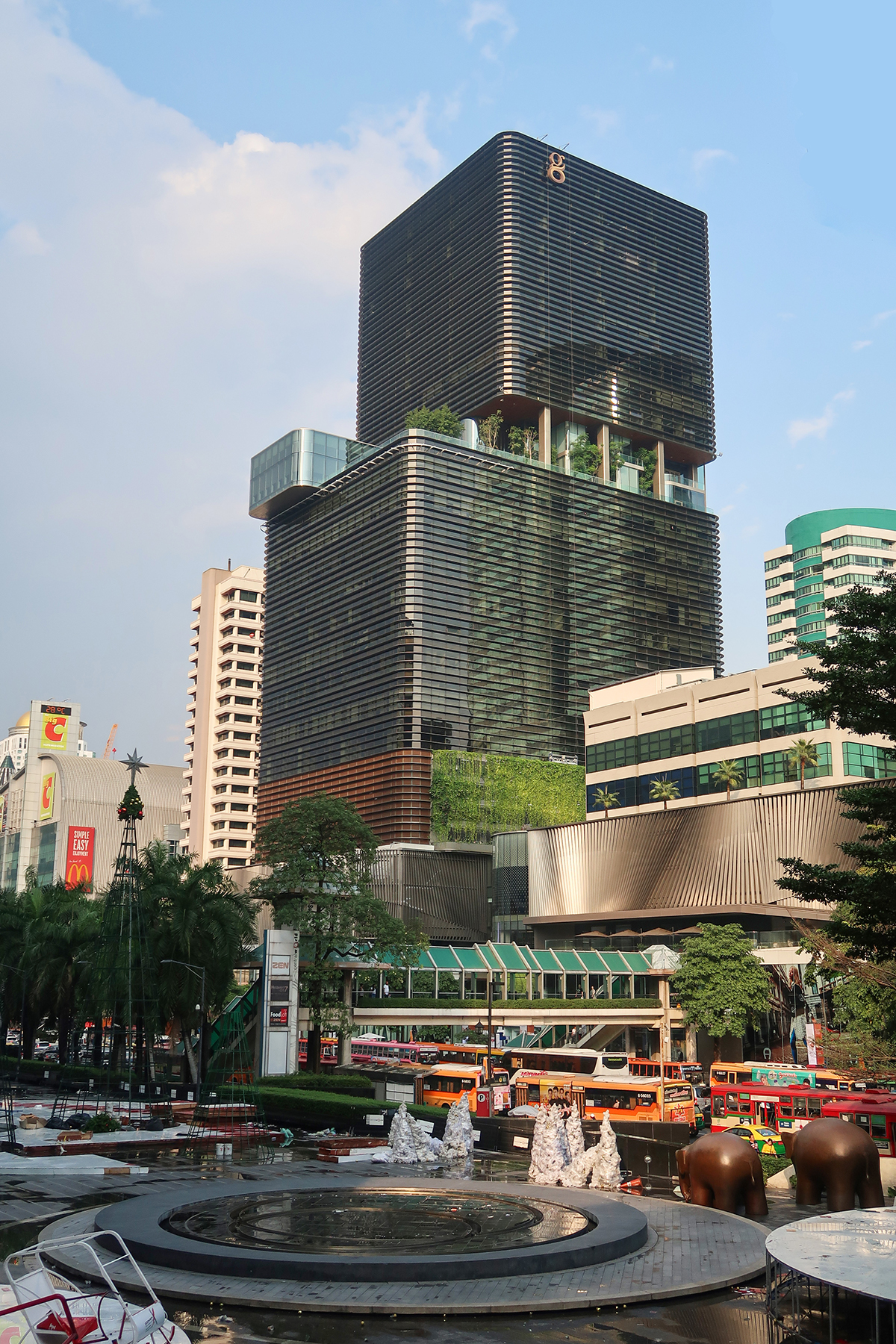
Gaysorn Tower completed in 2017

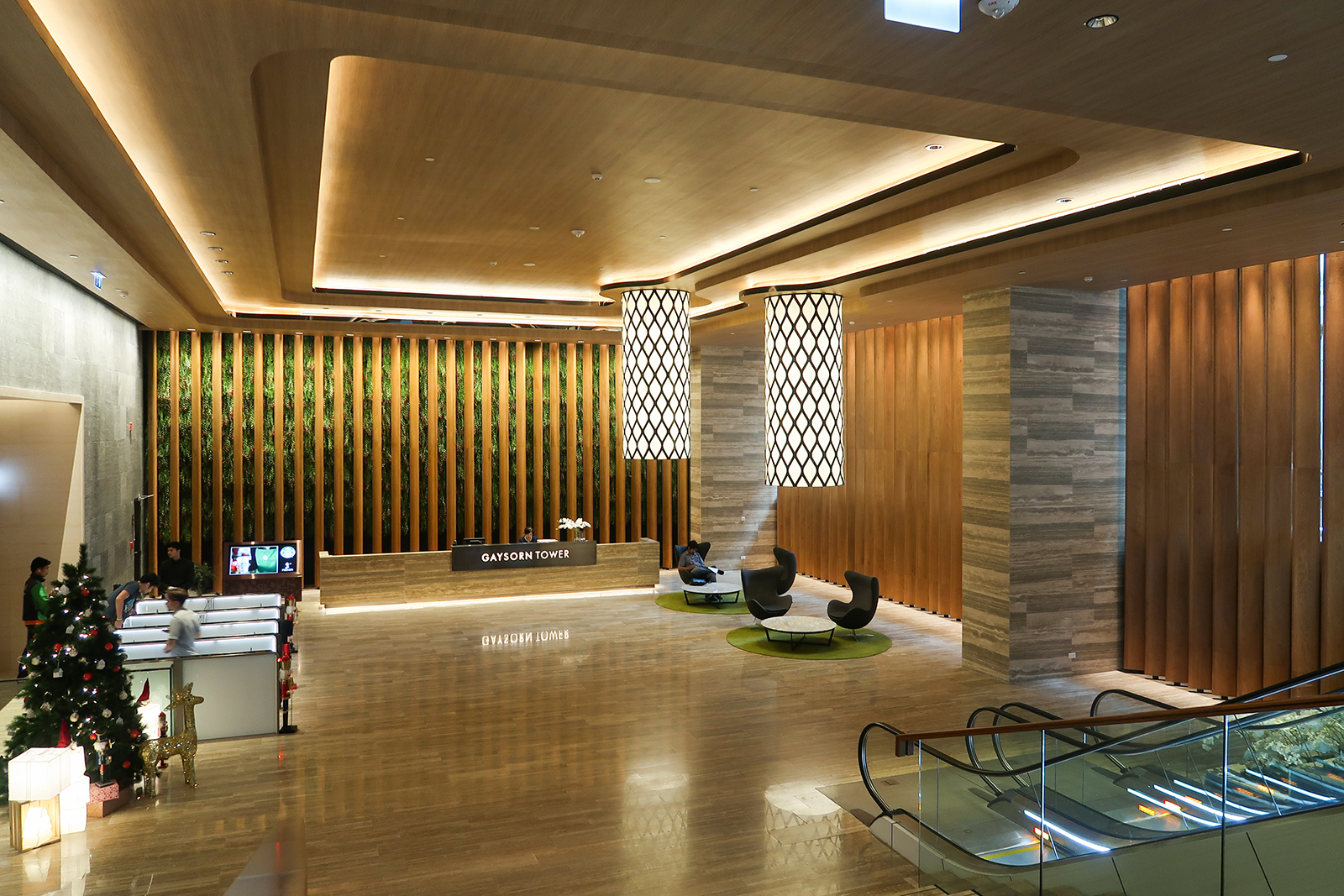
Gaysorn Tower office lobby

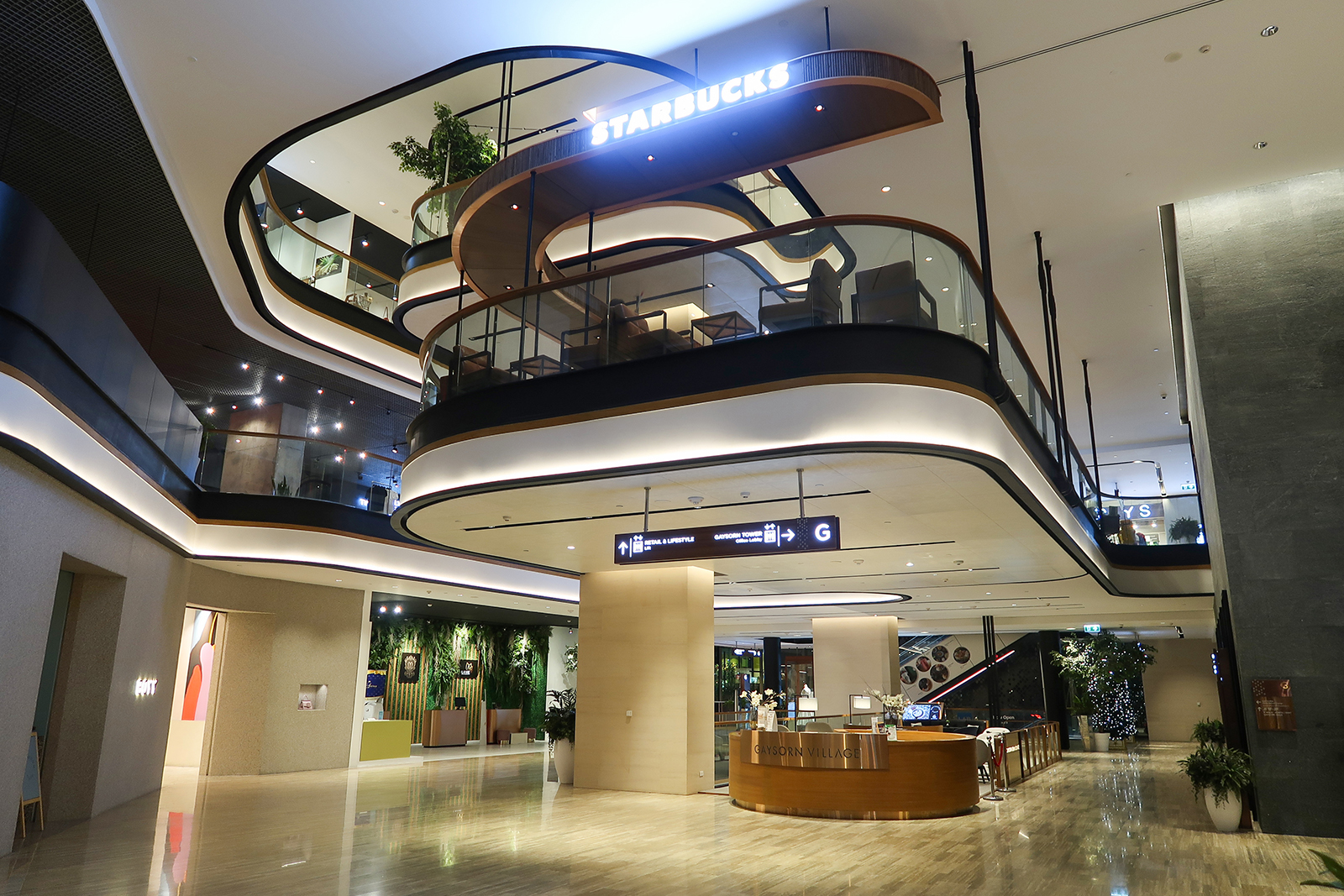
Gaysorn Walk

== Transportation ==
- BTS Skytrain Sukhumvit Line - Gaysorn has a direct skybridge link on its second floor to Chit Lom Station, InterContinental Hotel, Grand Hyatt Erawan Bangkok, Holiday Inn, Erawan Bangkok, Amarin Plaza and to CentralWorld.
