= Siam BTS station =

Skytrain station in Bangkok, Thailand

Siam สยาม
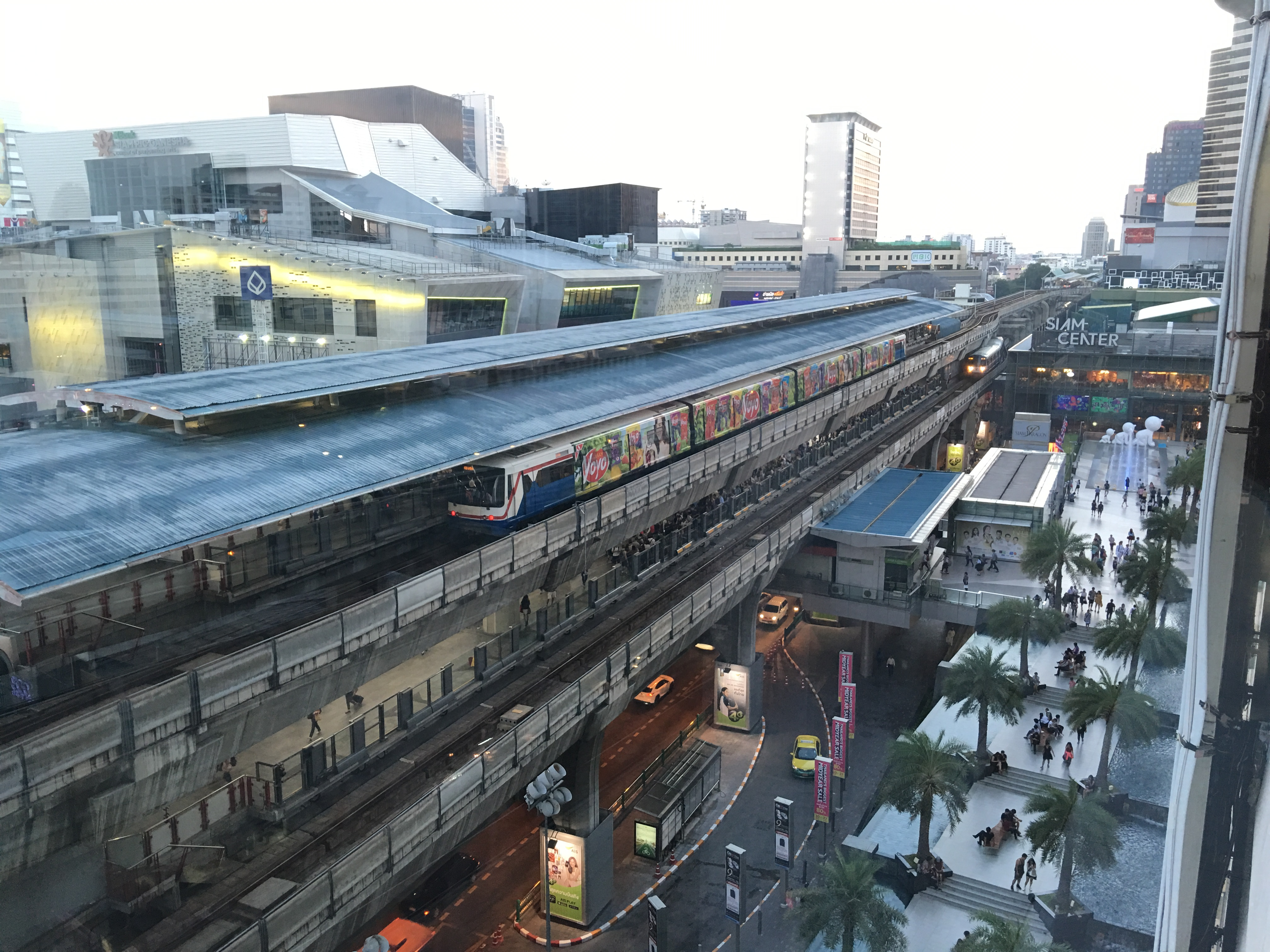
- Siam BTS Station, viewing from Siam Paragon.

General information
- Location: Pathum Wan; Bangkok; Thailand
- Coordinates: 13°44′44.23″N 100°32′3.22″E
- Owner: Bangkok Metropolitan Administration (BMA); BTS Rail Mass Transit Growth Infrastructure Fund (BTSGIF)
- Operator: Bangkok Mass Transit System; Public Company Limited (BTSC)
- Lines: Sukhumvit Line; Silom Line
- Platforms: 2 Island platform
- Tracks: 4
- Connections: BMTA Bus

Construction
- Structure type: Elevated

Other information
- Station code: CEN

History
- Opened: 5 December 1999; 26 years ago
- Electrified: Third rail 750 V DC

Passengers
- 2021: 6,160,924

Services
Preceding station	BTS Skytrain	Following station
Ratchathewi towards Khu Khot	Sukhumvit Line	Chit Lom towards Kheha
National Stadium Terminus	Silom Line	Ratchadamri towards Bang Wa
Location

Siam station (Thai: สถานีสยาม, RTGS: Sathani Sayam, pronounced [sā.tʰǎː.nīː sā.jǎːm]) is the cross-platform interchange station on the Sukhumvit and Silom Lines of the BTS Skytrain. It is Located on Rama I Road to the west of Pathum Wan intersection in the heart of Siam area, a shopping area in Pathum Wan district, Bangkok, Thailand. It is the largest and busiest station on the BTS with 40,000–50,000 passengers per day.

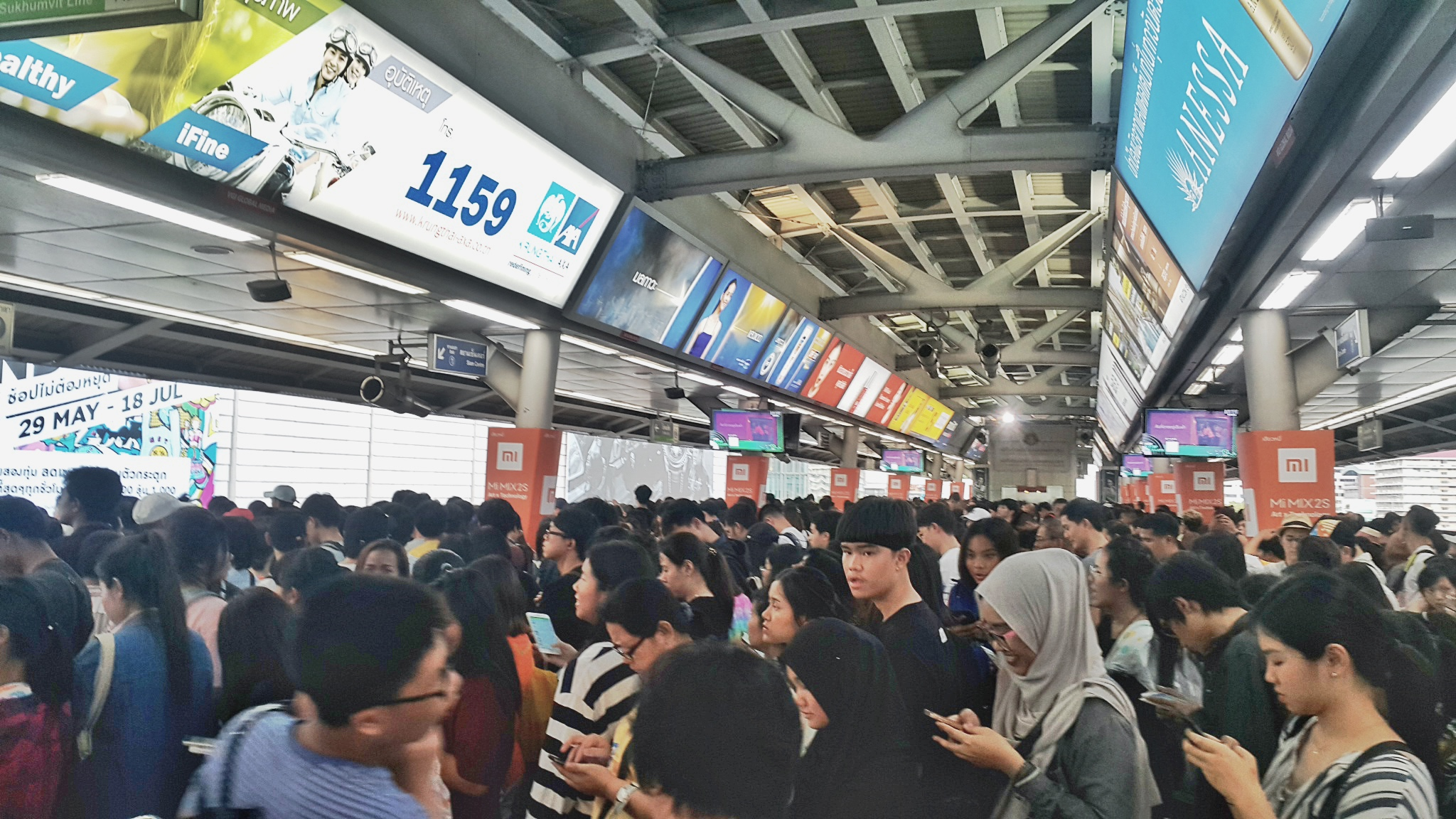
Crowded people on Siam BTS station on the rush hour in Bangkok, Thailand

== Facilities ==
Siam station is one of four BTS stations utilising an island platform, the other being Samrong, Wat Phra Sri Mahathat and Ha Yaek Lat Phrao, and is the only station on the Silom line to feature an island platform. At Siam, this is to facilitate transfer between lines. The upper level allows transfer between trains heading to Khu Khot and the National Stadium. The lower interchange level allows transfers between trains heading to Bang Wa and Kheha.

The station is located on Rama I Road to the west of Pathum Wan intersection in the heart of Siam area. The station is linked via skybridges to the Siam Square One, Siam Paragon, Siam Center and Centerpoint of Siam Square shopping centres. It is also adjacent to Siam Square. Additionally, an elevated walkway (called Sky Walk) connects Siam station to Central World Plaza, the Ratchaprasong junction and Chit Lom station.

== Station layout ==
Floor 4 (Platform)	Platform 2	Sukhumvit Line towards Khu Khot (Ratchathewi)
Floor 4 (Platform)	Island platform, doors will open on the left; doors will open on the right
Floor 4 (Platform)	Platform 4	Silom Line towards National Stadium (Terminus)
Floor 3 (Platform)	Platform 1	Sukhumvit Line towards Kheha (Chit Lom)
Floor 3 (Platform)	Island platform, doors will open on the right; doors will open on the left
Floor 3 (Platform)	Platform 3	Silom Line towards Bang Wa (Ratchadamri)
Floor 2 (Ticket Booths)	ticket sales floor	Exit 1-6, BTS Passenger and Tourist Service Center; Sale of tickets, ticket vending machines, shops Siam Paragon, Siam Center, Centerpoint Siam Square, CentralWorld - Royal Sky Walk
Ground Floor (Street Level)	-	Bus stop, Siam Square; Scala Cinema, Novotel Hotel, Wat Pathum Wanaram, Royal Thai Police; Police General Hospital, Faculty of Pharmaceutical Science, Chulalongkorn University, Faculty of Veterinary Science, Chulalongkorn University and Chulalongkorn University

== Bus connections ==
BMTA BUS

- 15: Kanlapaphruek Depot – Bang Lamphu
- 16: Kamphaengphet Depot - Mochit 2 – Surawong Road
- 21: Wat Khu Sang – Chulalongkorn University
- 25: Pak Nam – Sanam Luang
- 54: Rama 9 Depot - Huai Khwang (Loop)
- 73: Siam Park Depot – Memorial Bridge
- 79: Borommaratchachonnani Depot – Ratchaprasong
- 141: Samae Dam Depot – Chulalongkorn University
- 204: Huai Khwang – Victory Monument - Ratchawong Pier (Ordinary Bus)
- 204: Huai Khwang – Din Daeng - Ratchawong Pier (Air-Conditioner Bus)
- 501: Min Buri – Hua Lamphong
- 508: Pak Nam – Tha Raj Woradij

Smart BUS

- 40: Lam Sali - Southern Bus Terminal (Pinklao)
- 48: Ramkhamhaeng University Bangna Campus - Wat Pho

CU POP BUS

- 1: Sala Phrakiao - BTS Siam (Loop)
- 4: Sala Phrakiao - BTS Siam - Faculty of Education

== Nearby landmarks ==
- Siam Square
- Scala Cinema
- Faculties of Pharmaceutical Sciences, Dentistry and Veterinary Medicine of Chulalongkorn University
- Wat Pathum Wanaram
- Royal Thai Police Headquarters
- Police General Hospital

=== Shopping ===
- Siam Center
- Siam Discovery
- Siam Paragon
- CentralWorld

=== Hotels ===
- Centara Grand and Bangkok Convention Centre
- Novotel Siam Square Hotel
- Siam Kempinski Hotel Bangkok
- Chatrium Hotel Grand Siam Bangkok

== See also ==
Other interchange stations in Bangkok with paid area integration.

- Krung Thep Aphiwat Central Terminal (Bang Sue Grand Station)
- Muang Thong Thani MRT station
- Tao Poon MRT station
- Wat Phra Sri Mahathat station
