= Central Chidlom =

Shopping mall in Bangkok, Thailand

Coordinates: 13°44′40″N 100°32′40″E

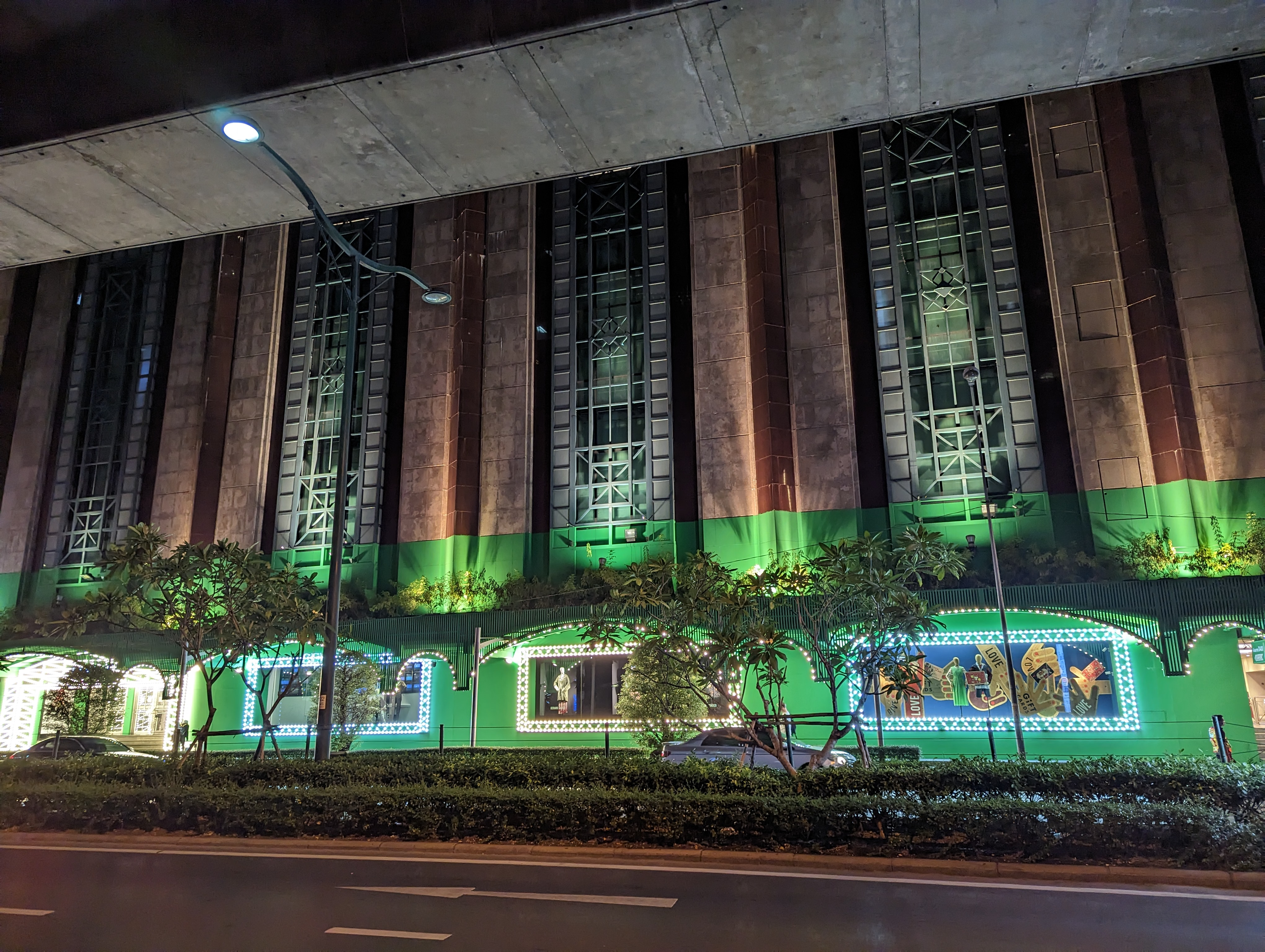
- Central Chidlom by night
- Location: 1027 Ploenchit Road, Pathum Wan, Bangkok 10330
- Opened: 23 January 1973
- Manager: Central Group
- Owner: Central Group
- Floors: 7
- Website: www.central.co.th

Central Chidlom is a large department store located in Bangkok, Thailand. It is the flagship store of the Central Group. The store has a total of seven floors and sells many luxury products. It is accessible by either BTS Skytrain or several city buses.

== History ==
In 1973, Central Group opened Central Chidlom on an area of over 7 rai (11,000 m^{2}; 120,000 sq ft) with an investment budget of 80 million baht (US$2,477,164.00) under the concept of " One Stop Shopping ". It is the first branch that sells products in all departments. including imported products from all over the world At first, The mall was built with only four floors.

=== 1995 fire damage ===
On November 22, 1995, Central Chidlom was caught fire due to a short circuit. The fire was burning in the building for more than 24 hours. The damage was not less than 1,535 million baht (US$47,543.83). Expensive products. and documents were lost to the fire. This caused the headquarters to be moved to CentralPlaza Ladprao.

After the fire and the building fell apart Central decided to build a new building. The mall was then renovated and reopened again in November 1997. The fire was caused due to short circuit in the building, However it is widely theorized that the fire was caused by a group of people that was angry at Central Group which they decided to seek revenge by burning the building.

== Location ==
Central Chidlom is located in Pathum Wan District on Chit Lom road

== Facilities ==
=== Anchors ===
==== Main anchors ====
- Central Department Store

==== Key tenants ====
- SuperSports – A large sporting equipment shop.
- PowerBuy – Thai electronics store
- B2S Think Space – Book and stationery store
- Tops Food Hall – This premium-level supermarket offers household products, fresh fruits and vegetables, dairy products, butcheries and seafood. There are also a wine cellar, a food court and a variety of restaurants and fast food outlets.
- Lofter(old Foodloft) – Thai food court on 6th Floor
- Muji
