= WMO (disambiguation) =

The World Meteorological Organization is a specialized agency of the United Nations.

WMO may also refer to:

- Waste Management Organization/Organisation — see short descriptions of Nuclear Waste Management Organization (Canada) and ONDRAF
- Waste Motor Oil, used engine oil
- Wayanad Muslim Orphanage, Kerala, India
- Weak memory order — see memory ordering
- West Mountain Observatory
- Wheatland Music Organization
- Wireless Monitoring Organisation, India
- Wonderful Music of, a music label — see Wonderful Music of Donovan and The Singing Detective
- World Mahjong Organization
- World Memon Organization
- World Migration Organization
- World Mime Organisation
- World Muay Thai Organization / World Muaythai Organization — see MBK Fight Night § History
- WMO 2015, or Social Support Act 2015, a Dutch law
- War Memorials Trust § War Memorials Officer campaign
- Widgiemoolthalite's IMA symbol (Wmo)
- White Mountain Airport's IATA code and FAA LID
- Wom language (Papua New Guinea)'s ISO 639-3 code
- Wangmo County (Chinese: 望谟县, romanized: Wàngmó Xiàn), Guizhou province, China 's division code (also 522326) — see list of administrative divisions of Guizhou
- Windows Mobile — see Template:VgPlatforms
