= Vehicle registration plates of Switzerland =

Swtizerland/Schweiz/Suisse/Svizzera/Svizra
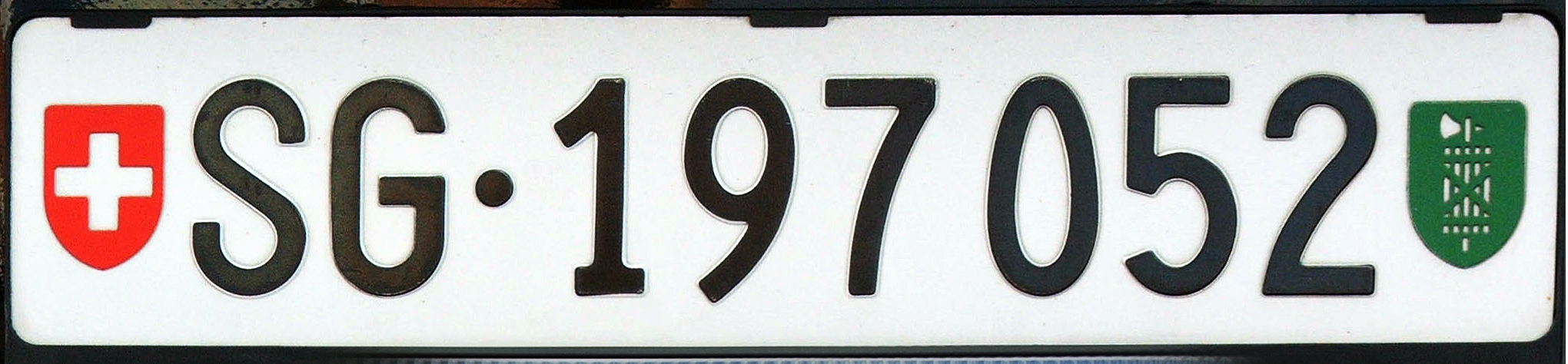
- Rear plate from Canton of St. Gallen, long format
- Country: Switzerland
- Country code: CH

Current series
- Serial format: AB·123456
- Front plate: 300 mm × 80 mm (11 3/4 in × 3 1/4 in)
- Rear plate: 300 mm × 160 mm (11 3/4 in × 6 1/4 in); 500 mm × 110 mm (19 3/4 in × 4 1/4 in)
- Introduced: 1972 (current size); 1987 (long rear format)

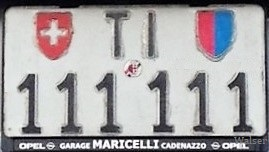
Rear plate, Canton of Ticino, high format

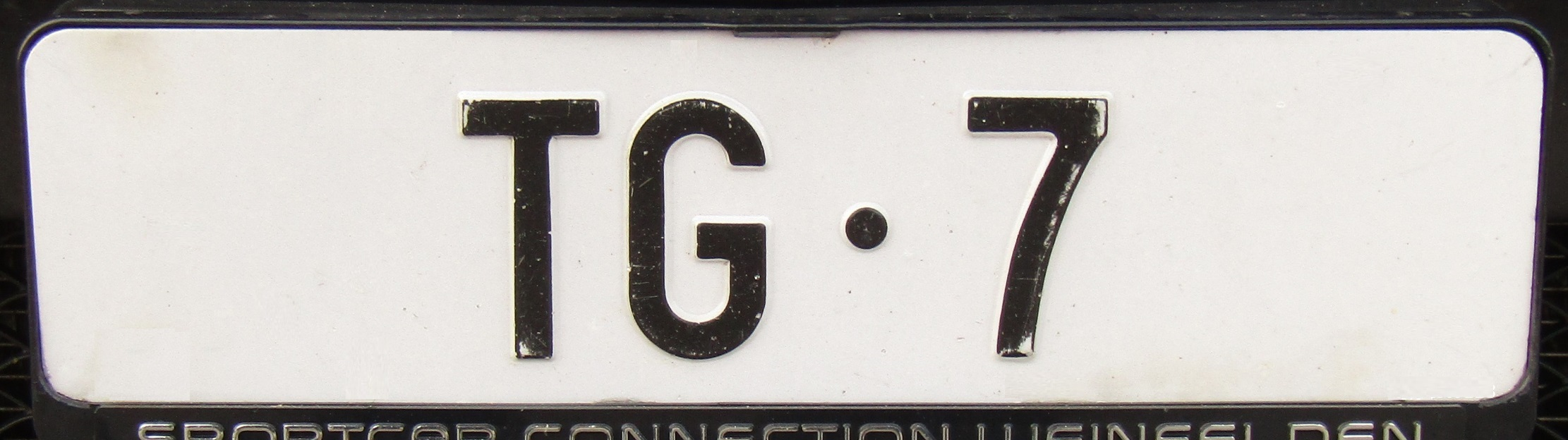
Front plate, Thurgau

Vehicle license plates of Switzerland, are composed of a two-letter code for the canton and a number with up to 6 digits. The rear plates also display the coats of arms of Switzerland and the respective canton. In 1987, the optional long format for rear plates, which had been abolished in 1972, was reintroduced.

The vehicle license number plates are assigned to the car owner and not to the vehicle. If the owner changes the vehicle, the same vehicle license number plates are attached to the new vehicle. The previous vehicle receives the vehicle license number plates of the new owner. It is also possible to own two (or more) vehicles that share the vehicle license number plates: the plates are physically unmounted from one vehicle and mounted on another, provided the vehicles in question are owned by the same owner of the vehicle license number plate. In some cantons, when vehicle license number plates are returned and retired, they are made available again after a certain time.

== Canton codes ==

Code	Flag	Canton
AG	Flag of Aargau	Aargau
AI	Flag of Appenzell Innerrhoden	Appenzell Innerrhoden
AR	Flag of Appenzell Ausserrhoden	Appenzell Ausserrhoden
BE	Flag of Bern	Bern
BL	Flag of Basel-Country	Basel-Landschaft
BS	Flag of Basel-City	Basel-Stadt
FR	Flag of Fribourg	Fribourg
GE	Flag of Geneva	Geneva
GL	Flag of Glarus	Glarus
GR	Flag of Graubünden	Grisons
JU	Flag of Jura	Jura
LU	Flag of Lucerne	Lucerne
NE	Flag of Neuchâtel	Neuchâtel
NW	Flag of Nidwalden	Nidwalden
OW	Flag of Obwalden	Obwalden
SG	Flag of St. Gallen	St. Gallen
SH	Flag of Schaffhausen	Schaffhausen
SO	Flag of Solothurn	Solothurn
SZ	Flag of Schwyz	Schwyz
TG	Flag of Thurgau	Thurgau
TI	Flag of Ticino	Ticino
UR	Flag of Uri	Uri
VD	Flag of Vaud	Vaud
VS	Flag of Valais	Valais
ZG	Flag of Zug	Zug
ZH	Flag of Zurich	Zürich

Until 2020, vehicles in the Italian enclave of Campione d'Italia were registered in Ticino, but are now to be registered in the Italian town of Como.

== Types ==
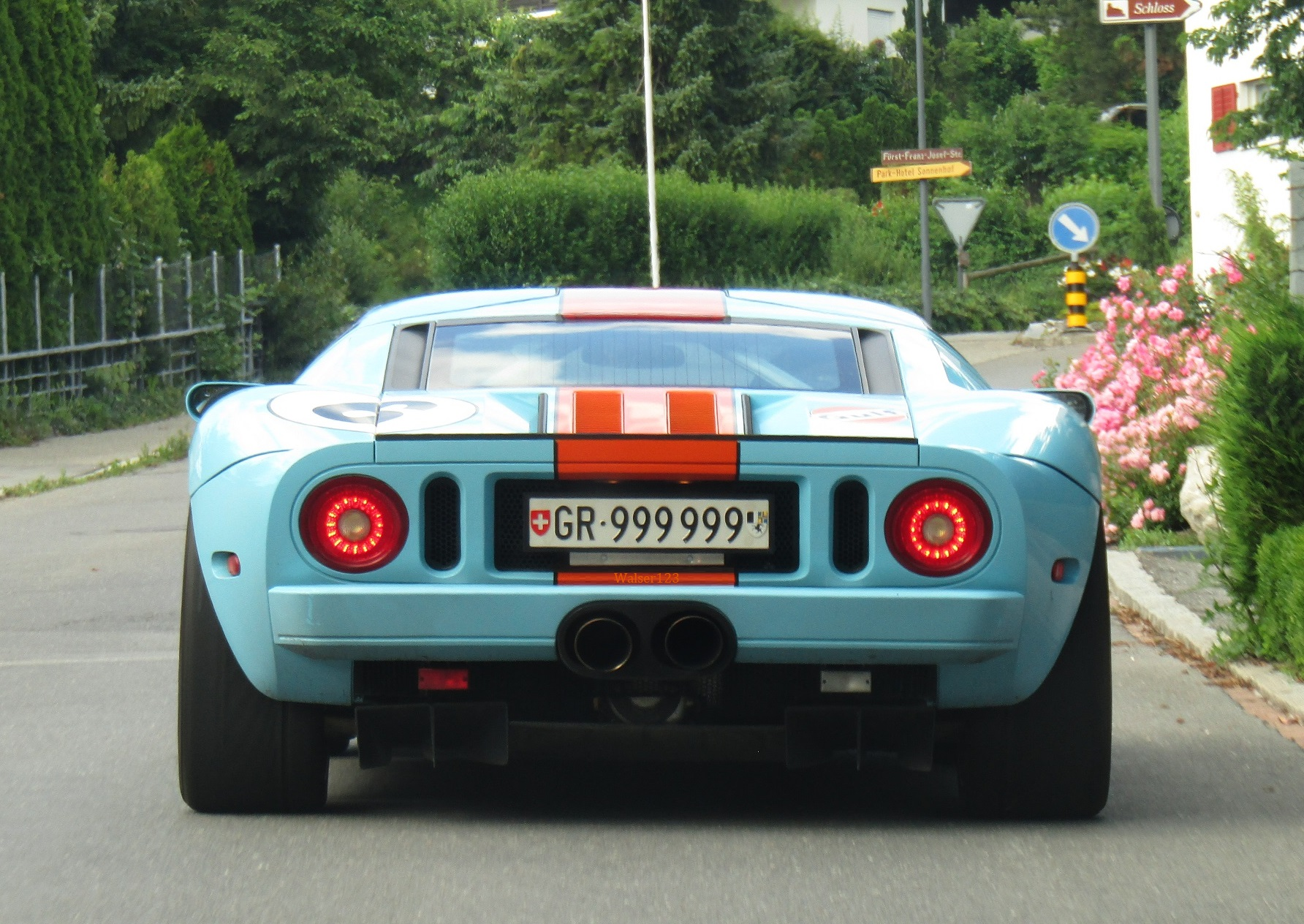
Personalized plate "999999" from Canton of Graubünden

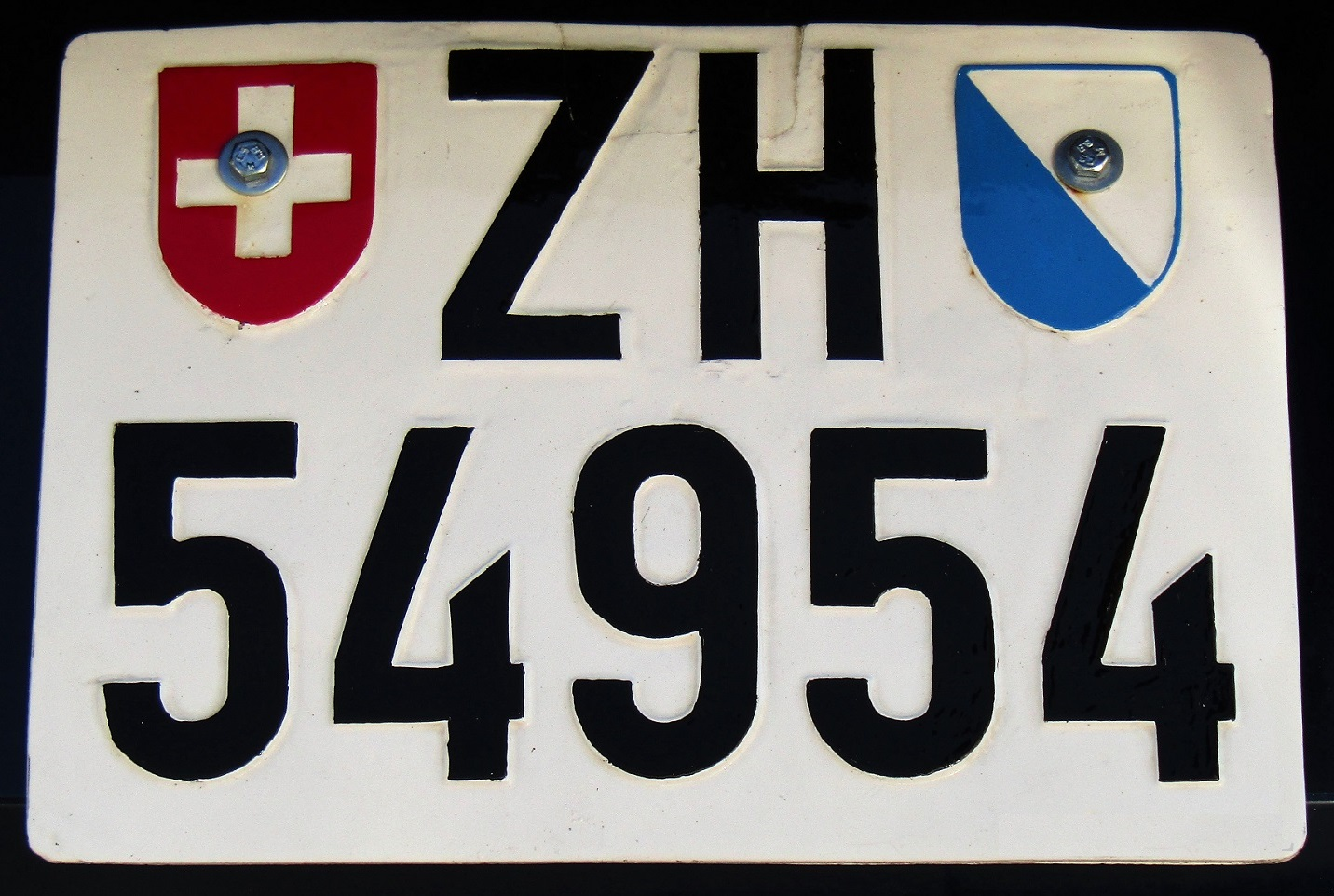
Old style rear plate, from Canton of Zürich

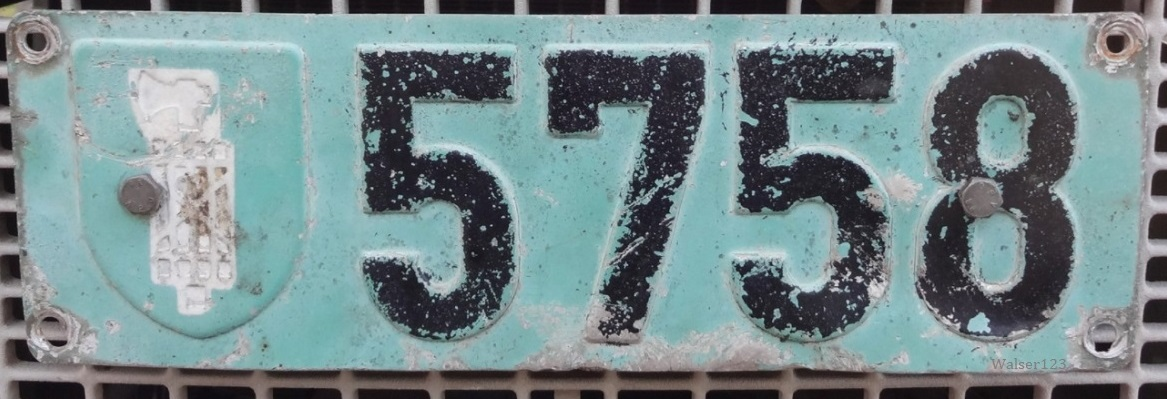
Old style tractor plate from Canton of St. Gallen

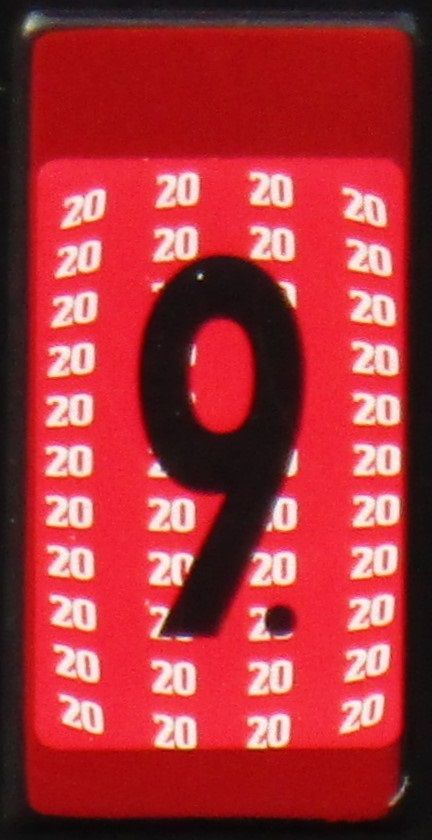
Control mark for temporary registrations

Standard type for motor vehicles, motorcycles and trailers
Utility vehicles e.g. for construction, snow removal, fire brigade etc.
Exceptional vehicles that do not comply with mass and weight regulations
Agricultural vehicles
Military vehicles
For vehicle dealers and workshops, additional letter "U"
Temporary registration, with control mark showing the expiry date
Temporary, duty unpaid, with control mark and letter "Z"
Motorcycles and electric vehicles
Light motor vehicles and small motorcycles limited to 45 km/h
Mopeds and E-Bikes
Segway vehicles
Bicycle carriers, rear plate only

== Diplomatic plates ==
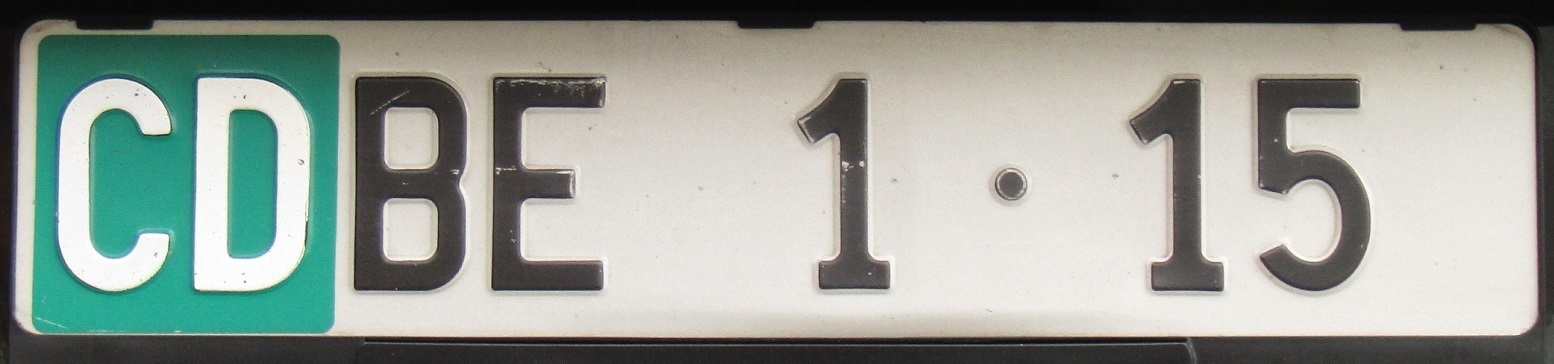
1 = Ambassador, 15 = Liechtenstein

Consular plate, 38 = Iraq

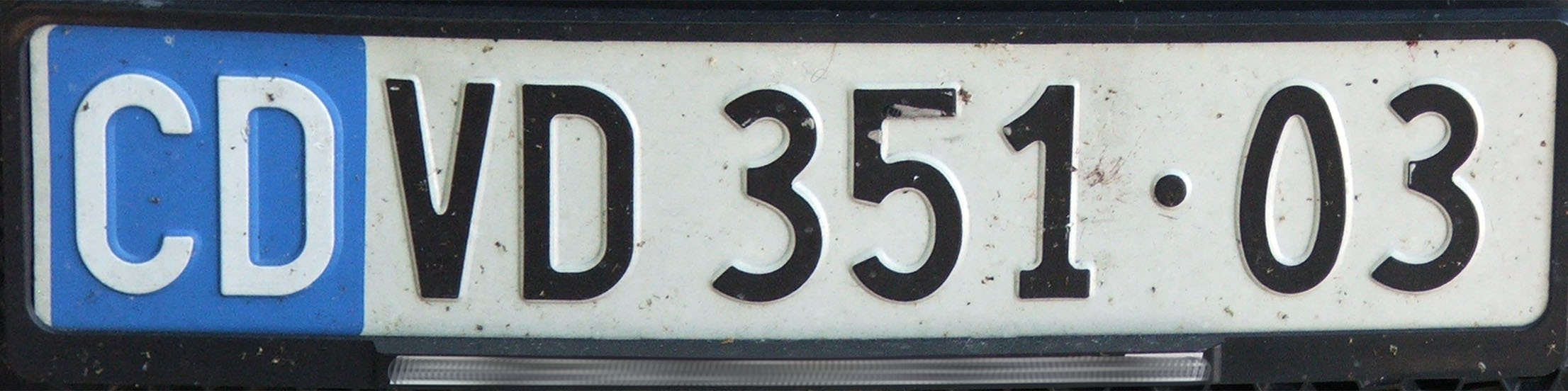
UN Mission, 03 = WHO

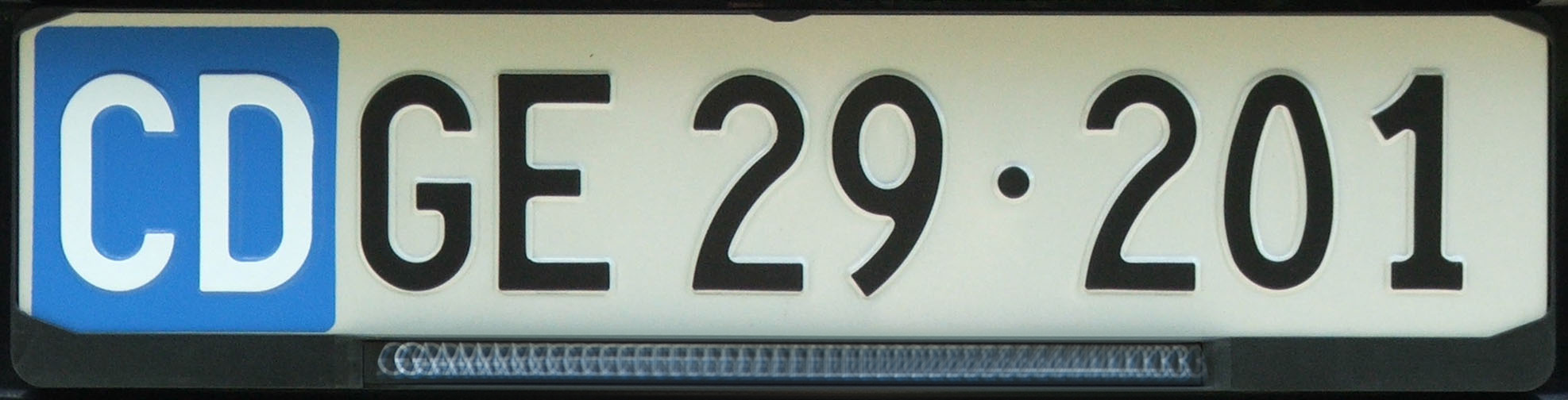
Int. Organization, 201 = EU

Swiss diplomatic plates display one of the prefixes "CD", "CC" or "AT", followed by a canton code, a serial number and a code for the country or organization. Low serial numbers are reserved for ambassadors or the head of an organization and their deputies.

CD

- Official cars of the diplomatic missions.
- Motor vehicles of the members of the diplomatic staff of these missions.

CC

- Vehicles of consular posts headed by a professional official.
- Motor vehicles of consular officials.

CD

- Vehicles of permanent missions or other representations to intergovernmental organizations and motor vehicles for the members of the diplomatic staff of these missions.
- Vehicles of institutional beneficiaries such as intergovernmental organizations, international institutions, secretariats or other bodies set up under an international treaty, independent commissions, international courts, arbitral tribunals and other international bodies, who enjoy privileges, immunities and facilities, as well as the motor vehicles of the highest-ranking officials of these institutional beneficiaries, who enjoy diplomatic status in Switzerland.

AT

- Vehicles belonging to members of the administrative and technical staff of diplomatic missions.

=== Diplomatic Codes ===
UN and other International Organizations based in Switzerland
01 – UN; 02 – ILO; 03 – WHO; 04 – WMO; 05 – ITU	06 – WIPO; 07 – CERN; 08 – WTO; 09 – EFTA; 010 – IOM	011 – IBE; 012 – IPU; 013 – ICDO; 014 – APEF; 015 – UPU	016 – OTIF; 017 – ADB; 018 – IHC; 019 – WCED; 020 – BIS	021 – ITCB; 022 – SC; 023 – ILC; 024 – ACTED; 025 – EC	026 – ICRC; 027 – . . . 028 – . . . 029 – . . . 030 – IFRC	031 – ACWL; 032 – OSCE; 033 – WMO; 034 – . . . 035 – GFATM; 036 – . . .

Permanent Observer Missions of International Organizations
201 – EU; 202 – OAS; 203 – SICA; 204 – SCI	205 – AGC; 206 – OAU; 207 – Commonwealth; 208 – Arab League	209 – ATO; 210 – IIDC; 211 – OIC; 212 – G-15	213 – OIF; 214 – World Bank; 215 – ACP; 216 – Macau WTO; 217 – PIF

Separately-Accredited Multilateral Missions

3xx – Conference on Disarmament

5xx – World Trade Organization (WTO)

(where xx = Foreign Mission Codes below: e.g. 309 = USA Mission to CD, 509 = USA Mission to WTO)

Foreign Diplomatic Missions
1 Vatican City; 2 Canada; 3 Sri Lanka; 4 Australia; 5 Iran; 6 Spain; 7 Israel; 8 Kuwait; 9 United States; 10 Brazil; 11 Mexico; 12 Ireland; 13 Japan; 14 New Zealand; 15 Liechtenstein; 16 Monaco; 17 South Africa; 18 Egypt; 19 Syria; 20 Algeria; 21 Argentina; 22 Austria; 23 Bolivia; 24 Chile; 25 Colombia; 26 South Korea; 27 Costa Rica; 28 Ivory Coast; 29 Cuba; 30 Ecuador; 31 Finland; 32 France; 33 Ghana; 34 Guatemala; 35 Haiti; 36 India; 37 Indonesia; 38 Iraq; 39 Italy; 40 Lebanon; 41 Panama; 42 Peru; 43 Philippines; 44 Portugal; 45 Tunisia	46 Turkey; 47 Uruguay; 48 Venezuela; 49 Vietnam; 50 Democratic Republic of the Congo; 51 Germany; 52 Nigeria; 53 Pakistan; 54 Bulgaria; 55 China; 56 Hungary; 57 Poland; 58 Romania; 59 Serbia; 60 Czech Republic; 61 Saudi Arabia; 62 Belgium; 63 Denmark; 64 Greece; 65 Libya; 66 Morocco; 67 Norway; 68 Netherlands; 69 Sweden; 70 Thailand; 71 Jordan; 72 United Kingdom; 73 Russia; 74 Luxembourg; 75 Ethiopia; 76 Dominican Republic; 77 Paraguay; 78 El Salvador; 79 Chinese Taipei; 80 Jamaica; 81 San Marino; 82 Trinidad and Tobago; 83 Yemen; 84 Gabon; 85 Malaysia; 86 Liberia; 87 Sudan; 88 Mongolia; 89 Malta; 90 Belarus	91 Ukraine; 92 Iceland; 93 Republic of the Congo; 94 Chad; 95 Myanmar; 96 Senegal; 97 Nicaragua; 98 Fiji; 99 Honduras; 100 Bangladesh; 101 Cambodia; 102 North Korea; 103 Benin; 104 Cyprus; 105 Singapore; 106 Central African Republic; 107 Qatar; 108 Oman; 109 Cameroon; 110 Madagascar; 111 Kenya; 112 Somalia; 113 United Arab Emirates; 114 Tanzania; 115 Burundi; 116 . . . . (Yemen until 1990); 117 Nepal; 118 Bahrain; 119 Afghanistan; 120 Rwanda; 121 Bhutan; 122 Guinea; 123 Zimbabwe; 124 Hong Kong; 125 Albania; 126 Brunei; 127 Dominica; 128 São Tomé and Príncipe; 129 Equatorial Guinea; 130 Belize; 131 Mauritius; 132 Kyrgyzstan; 133 Slovenia; 134 Croatia; 135 Zambia	136 Bosnia and Herzegovina; 137 Slovakia; 138 Lithuania; 139 Latvia; 140 Jordan; 141 Angola; 142 North Macedonia; 143 Gambia; 144 Armenia; 145 Estonia; 146 Uganda; 147 Kazakhstan; 148 Eritrea; 149 Georgia; 150 Mauritania; 151 Moldova; 152 Azerbaijan; 153 Lesotho; 154 Barbados; 155 Cape Verde; 156 Mozambique; 157 Andorra; 158 Botswana; 159 Mali; 160 Uzbekistan; 161 Burkina Faso; 162 Namibia; 163 Timor-Leste; 164 Saint Kitts and Nevis; 165 Eswatini; 166 Djibouti; 167 Maldives; 168 Montenegro; 169 Grenada; 170 Niger; 171 Tajikistan; 172 . . . . 173 Kosovo; 174 Palestine; 175 Togo; 176 Comoros; 177 Turkmenistan; 178 . . . . 179 Sierra Leone; 180 . . . . 181 South Sudan

== Obsolete types ==
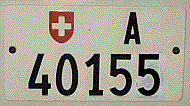
Administration, rear plate

Civilian Federal vehicles had registration plates composed of the Swiss shield followed by the letter "A" (short for "Administration") and a number with up to five digits. The first digit indicated the department. In 2004 these plates were replaced with normal cantonal plates.

- A 1xxxx – Federal Department of Foreign Affairs
- A 2xxxx – Federal Department of Home Affairs
- A 3xxxx – Federal Department of Justice and Police
- A 4xxxx – Federal Department of Defense, Civil Protection and Sport
- A 5xxxx – Federal Department of Finance
- A 6xxxx – Federal Department of Economy
- A 7xxxx – Federal Department of Environment, Transport, Energy and Communication

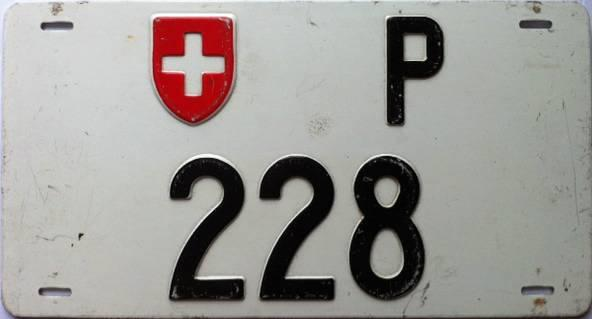
PTT / SBB, rear plate

The Post, Telegraph and Telephone company (PTT) and the Swiss Federal Railways (SBB) were part of the federal government until 1997/98. Their vehicles had registration plates composed of the Swiss coat followed by the letter "P" (short for "Post") and a number with up to five digits. When they became independent companies, the P-plates were replaced with cantonal plates in 2004.

- P 1xxxx to P 7xxxx were attributed to PTT
- P 8xxxx to P 9xxxx were attributed to SBB
