= MBK Center =

Coordinates: 13°44′44″N 100°31′48″E

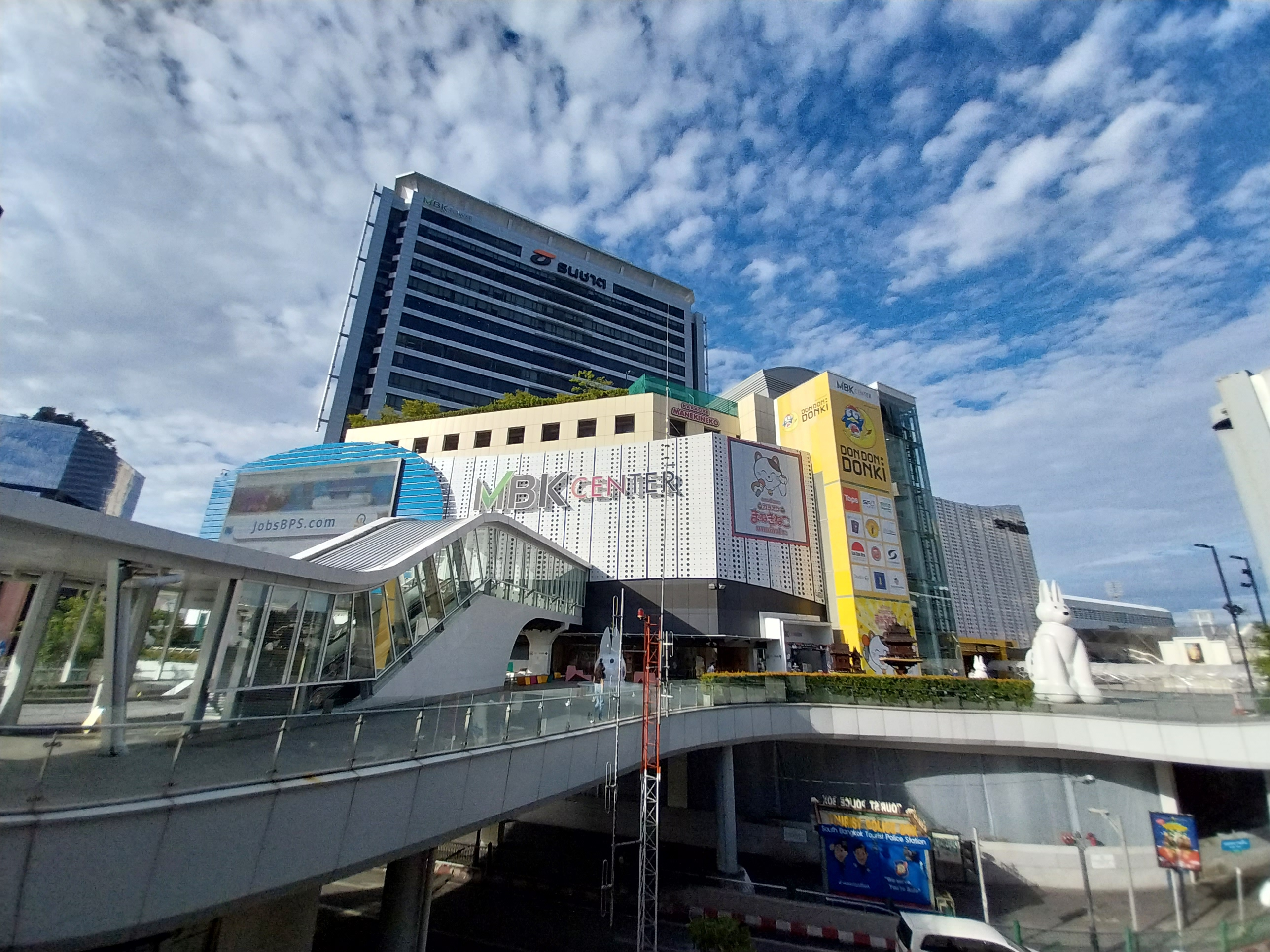
- MBK Center in 2023
- Location: Pathum Wan District, Bangkok, Thailand
- Opened: 7 February 1985 (Mahbunkhrong Center); 9 May 2000 (MBK Center); 2016 (Major Renovations); 21 December 2021 (Don Don Donki)
- Developer: Sirichai Bulakul
- Manager: MBK Public Company Limited (SET: MBK)
- Owner: Thanachart Bank & Dusit Thani Group
- Num. of stores: 2,000
- Num. of anchor tenants: 2
- Floors: 8
- Public transit: National Stadium BTS Station, Siam BTS Station
- Website: www.mbk-center.co.th

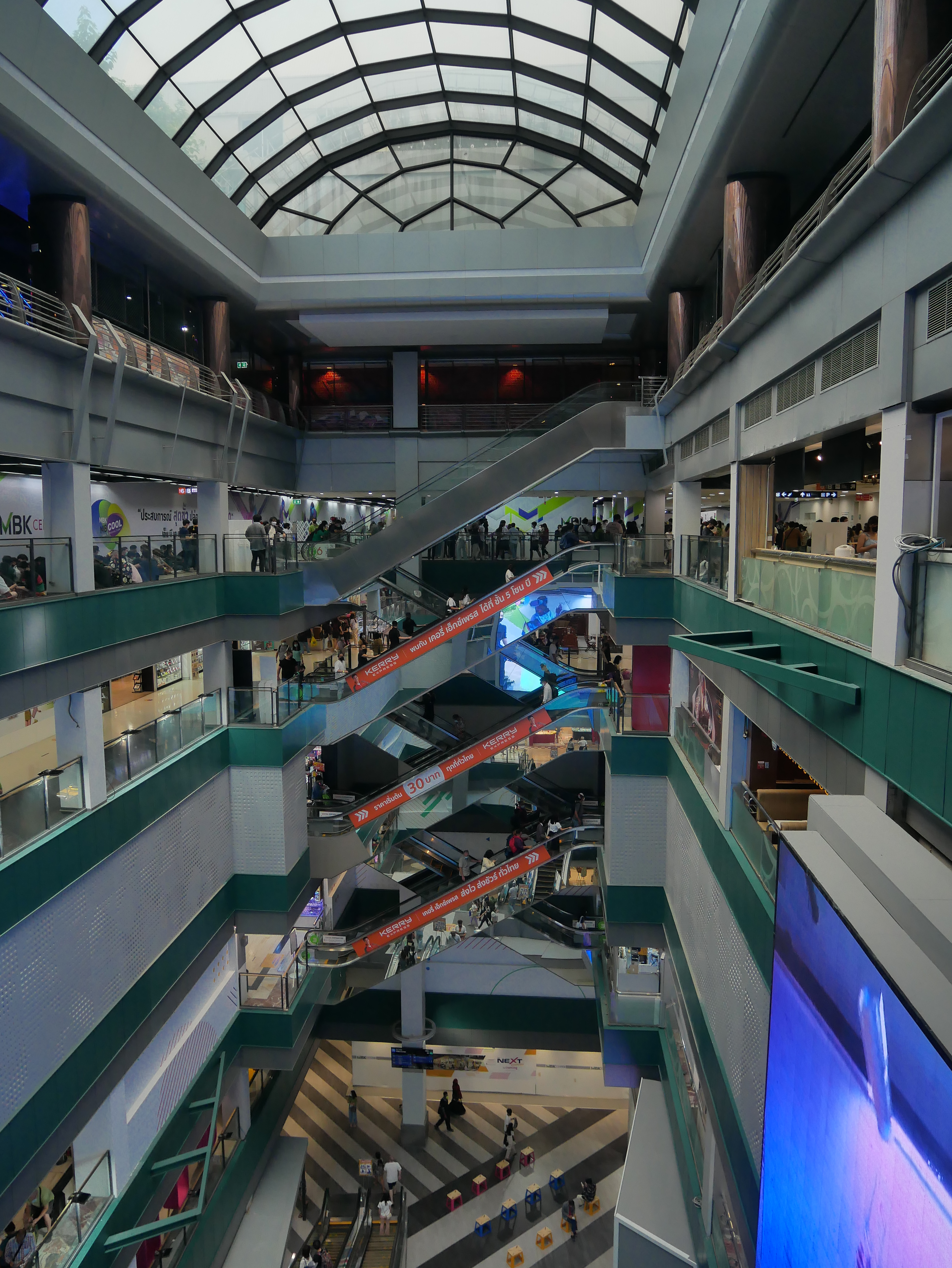
MBK Center Atrium

MBK Center (Thai: เอ็มบีเค เซ็นเตอร์), also known by its former name as Mahbunkhrong (Thai: มาบุญครอง, RTGS: Mabunkhrong, pronounced [māː.būn.kʰrɔ̄ːŋ]), is a large shopping mall in Siam area, Bangkok, Thailand. At eight storeys, the center contains around 2,000 shops, restaurants and service outlets.

In 2009, MBK Center management reported daily visitor numbers of more than 100,000, half of whom were young Thai people and a third foreign visitors.

== History ==
MBK Center was the largest shopping mall in Asia when it opened on 7 February 1985. It is situated on land leased from the adjacent Chulalongkorn University. This lease was renewed in 2013. MBK was named after the parents of the developer Sirichai Bulakul, Mah and Boonkrong, whose statues are located on the ground floor. The seventh floor used to house MBK Hall, a concert hall for popular Thai and foreign singers in the 1980s and 1990s. Said location now houses eight cinemas operated by SF Group.

== Anchor ==
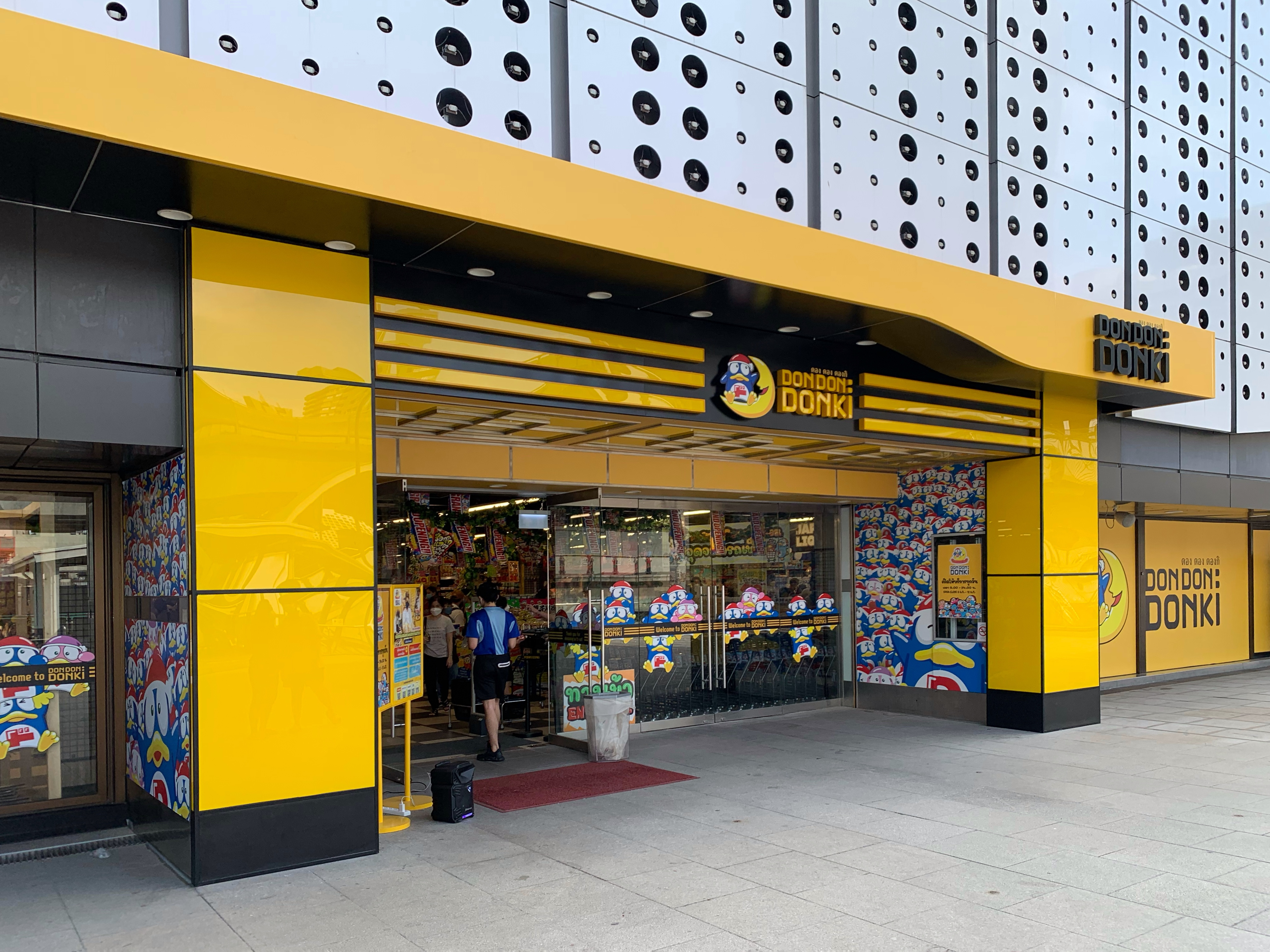
Don Don Donki

- Don Don Donki
- Tops
- Supersports Factory Outlet
- 7-Eleven
  - Kudsan Bakery & Coffee
- SF Cinema 8 Cinemas (Zigma CineStadium & Cinecafe 1 Cinema)
- Food Legends By MBK
- Too Fast Food (Food Court)
- Pathumwan Princess Hotel
- Thanachart Bank (Head Office)
- Animate (Japan Manga Alliance)

== Location ==
MBK Center is located in Pathum Wan District, on the southwest corner of the intersection of Rama I Road and Phaya Thai Road. It is close to Siam Square, which can be reached from the second floor via a covered pedestrian bridge over Phaya Thai Road, and Siam Center and Siam Paragon, which are across Rama I Road from Siam Square. The mall is next to National Stadium.

== Transportation ==
- BTS Skytrain - National Stadium BTS Station; also within walking distance of Siam station.
- Khlong Saen Saep - Hua Chang pier is within walking distance.

== Layout ==
=== Department store ===
- The Don Don Donki discount store is at the north end of MBK Center.

=== Hotel ===
- The Pathumwan Princess Hotel is at the south end of MBK Center.

== Sport activity ==
MBK Fight Night

== Gallery ==
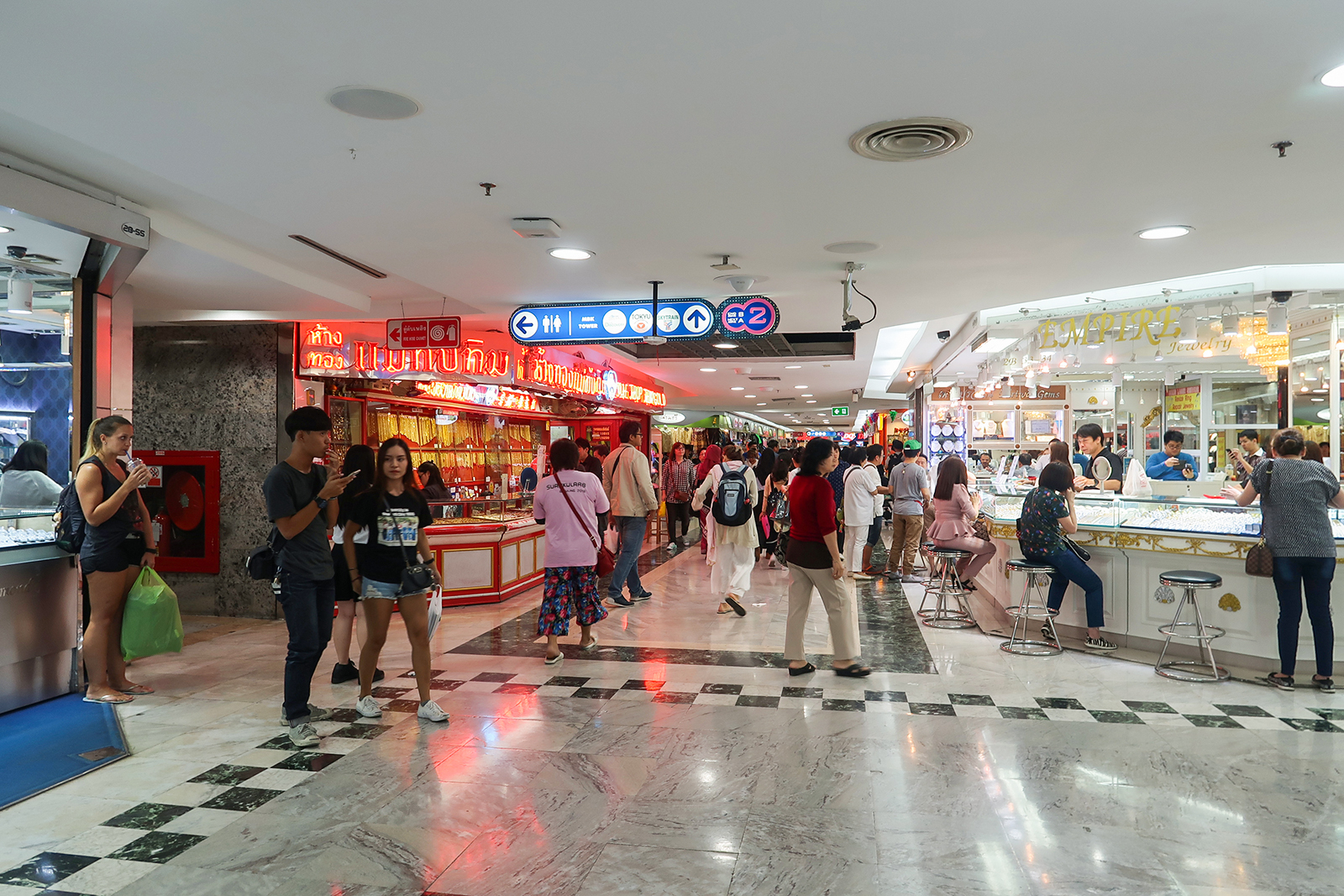
Level 2

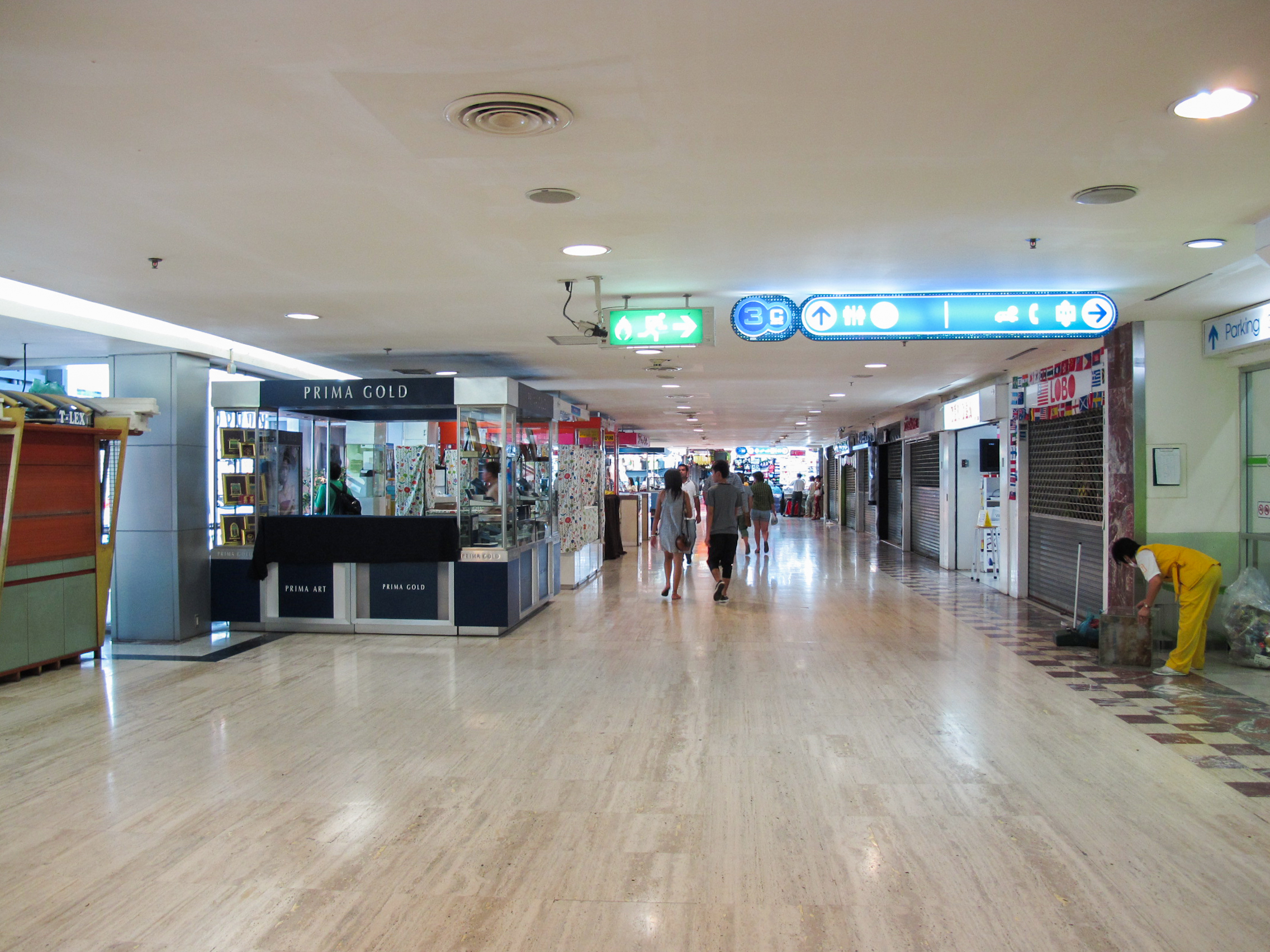
Level 3

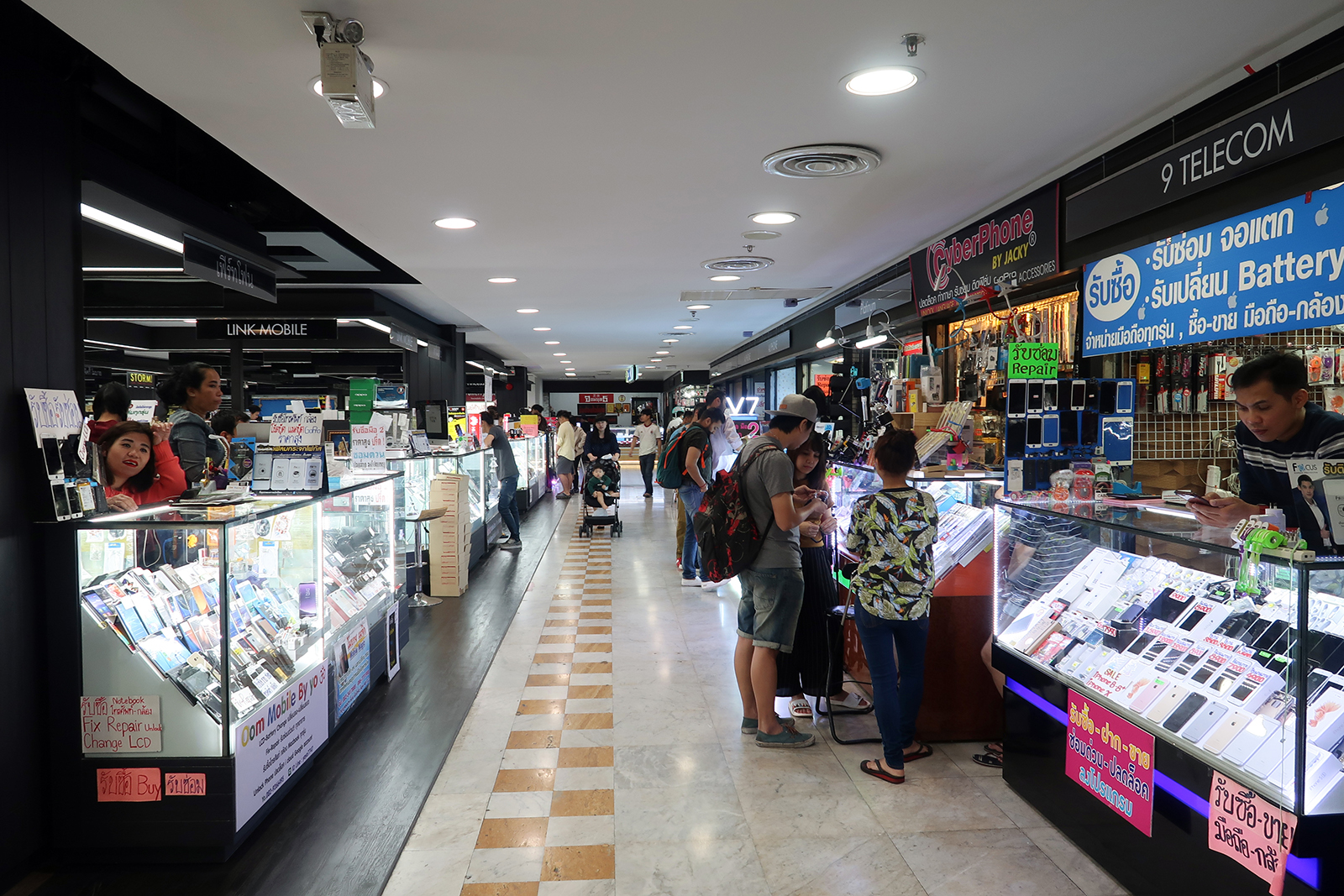
Level 4

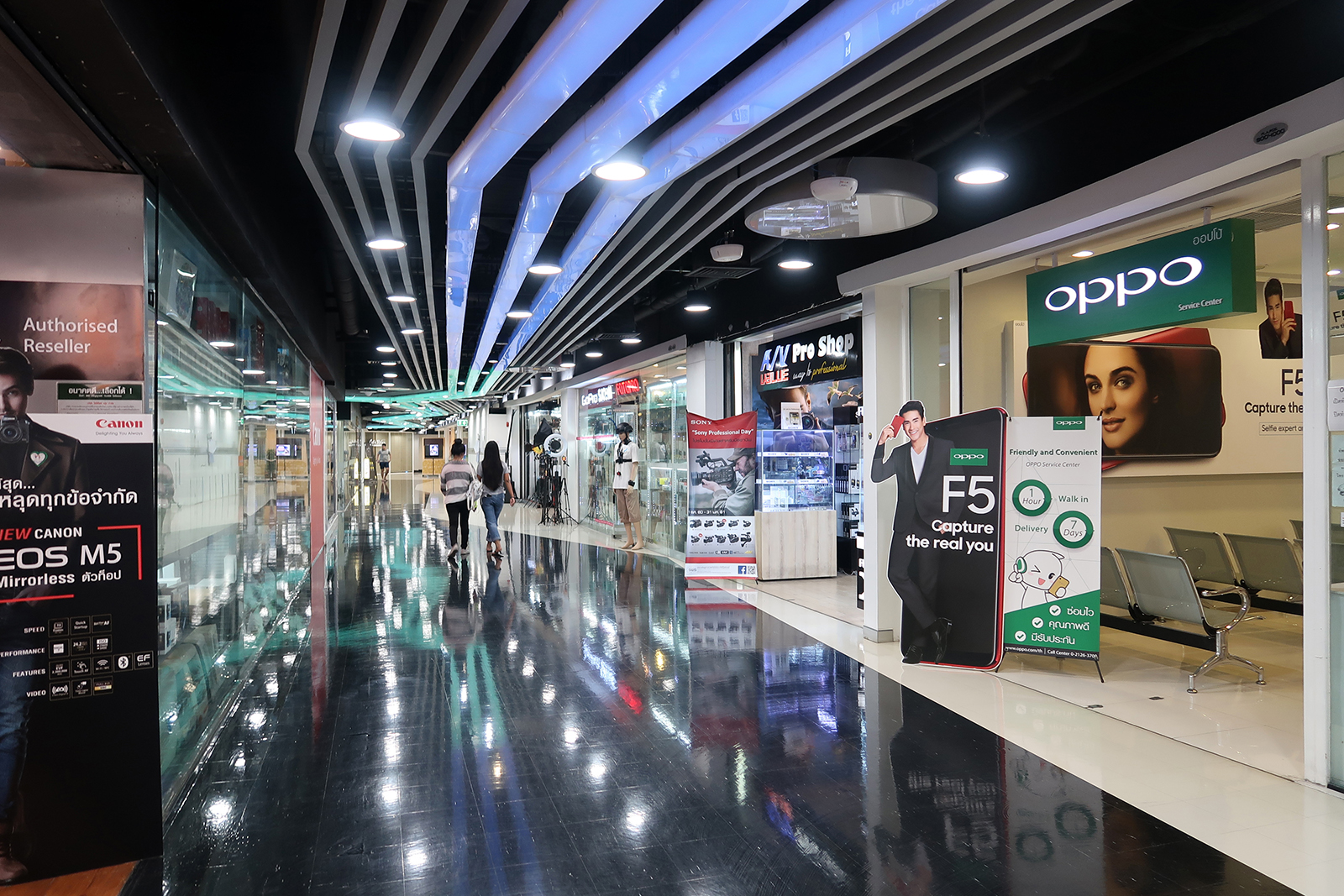
Level 5

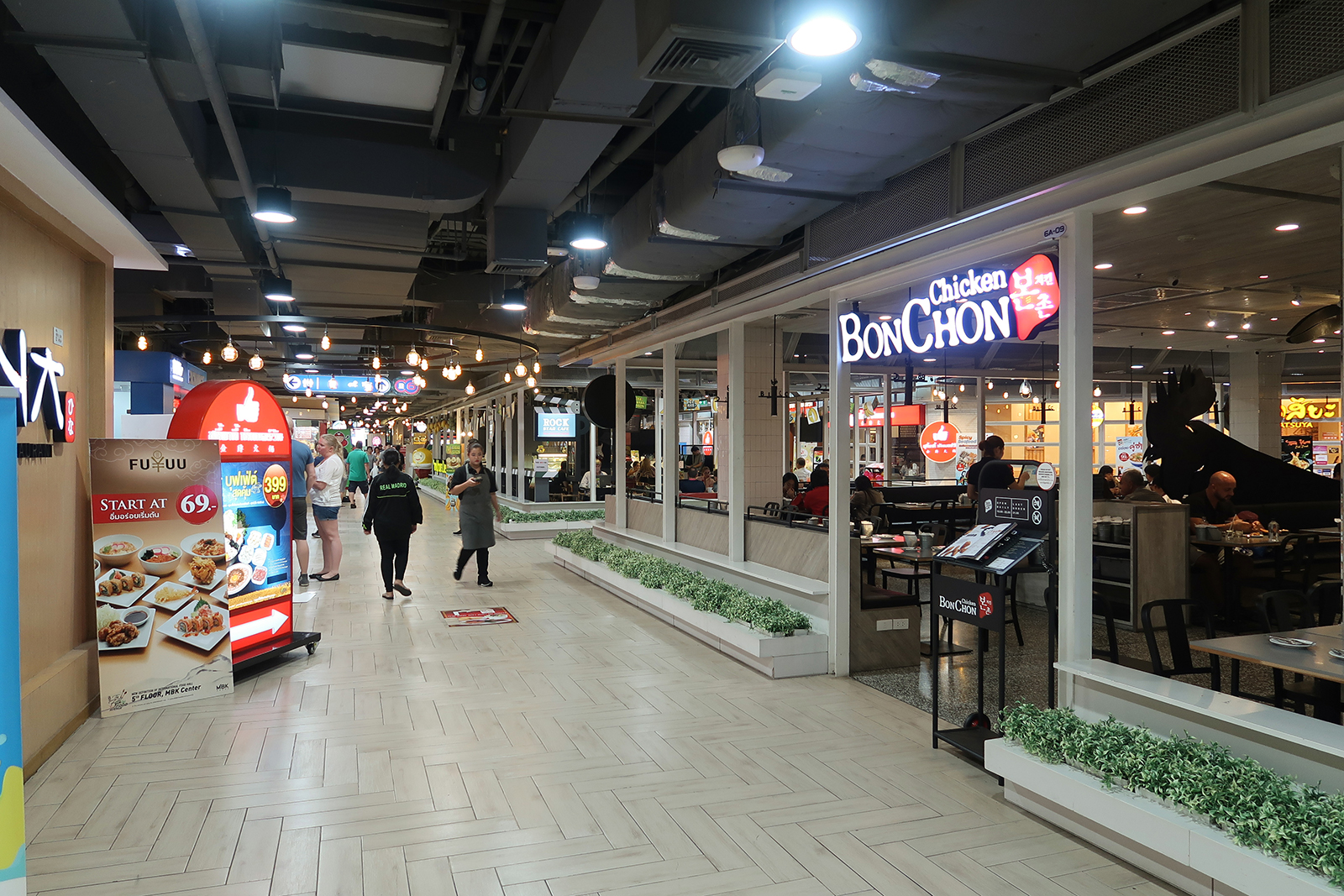
Level 6 Restaurants

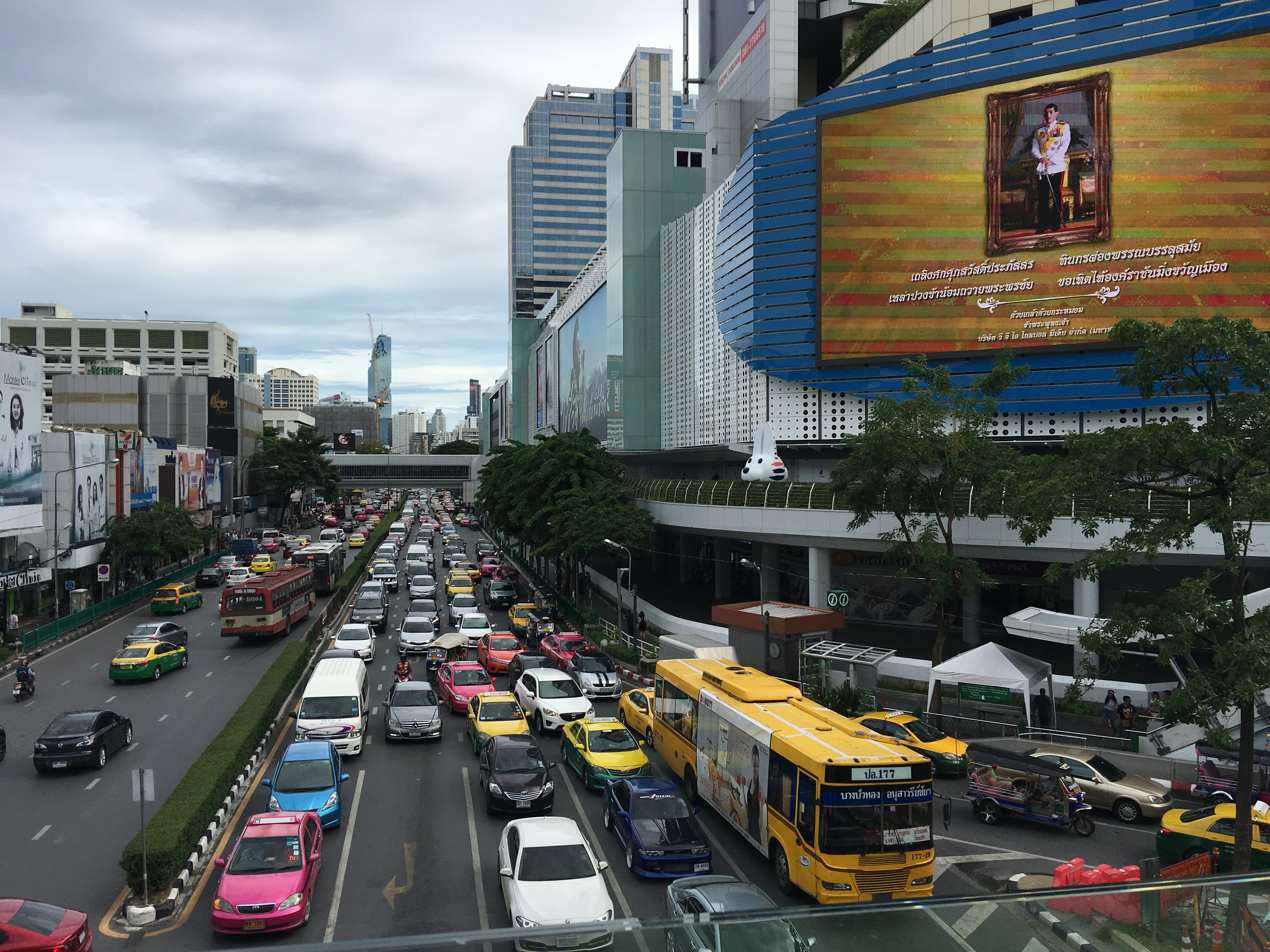
