= MBK Fight Night =

Muay Thai organizer and promotor

- Interactive map of MBK Fight Night
- Address: 444 Phayathai Rd, Wang Mai, Pathum Wan District; Bangkok 10330; Thailand
- Coordinates: 13°44′44″N 100°31′48″E
- Operator: World Muay Thai Organization (2012-present)
- Type: Muay Thai organizer and promotor
- Event: Martial arts
- Field shape: Out-late
- Public transit: National Stadium BTS Station, Siam BTS Station
- Parking: Available

Construction
- Years active: 2010-present
- Project manager: MBK Center

Website
- www.mbk-center.co.th

MBK Fight Night (Thai: เอ็มบีเค ไฟท์ไนท์) is a Muay Thai, Kickboxing and Mixed martial arts promotions managed by MBK Center in Bangkok.

== History ==
The MBK Fight Night started outside the MBK Center shopping mall in 2010. Since 2012, WMO - World Muay Thai Organization has been responsible for hosting the events and launching a live broadcast on Facebook. In 2020, mixed martial arts campaigns were added to the MBK Fight Night programs. This event, which is held in collaboration with P'N Fighter Club, held on Fridays at 18:00. One of the main goals of this MBK Fight Night is to promote Muay Thai culture and attract foreign visitors to the MBK Center. Thai fighters are compared to foreign fighters from different countries such as Myanmar, France, Iran, etc. in the open environment outside the shopping center. Watching real fights for free in the center of Bangkok is attractive for tourists. For this reason, the outdoor space of the MBK Center is usually full of spectators.

== See also ==
- MBK Center
