= World Migration Organization =

The World Migration Organization (WMO) is a proposed international organization to provide information and analysis on global (im)migration issues. It would be similar to the World Trade Organization and operate in the United Nations system.

The organization has been proposed by academics and researchers such as Professor Jagdish Bhagwati and Arthur Helton and discussed by organizations such as the Global Commission on International Migration (GCIM), the International Organization for Migration (IOM), the World Bank and others.
