= 2026 Thailand school shooting =

2026 Thailand school shooting may refer to:

- 2026 Hat Yai school shooting
- 2026 Bang Kruai school shooting
