= 2023 Siam Paragon shooting =

Mass shooting in Bangkok, Thailand

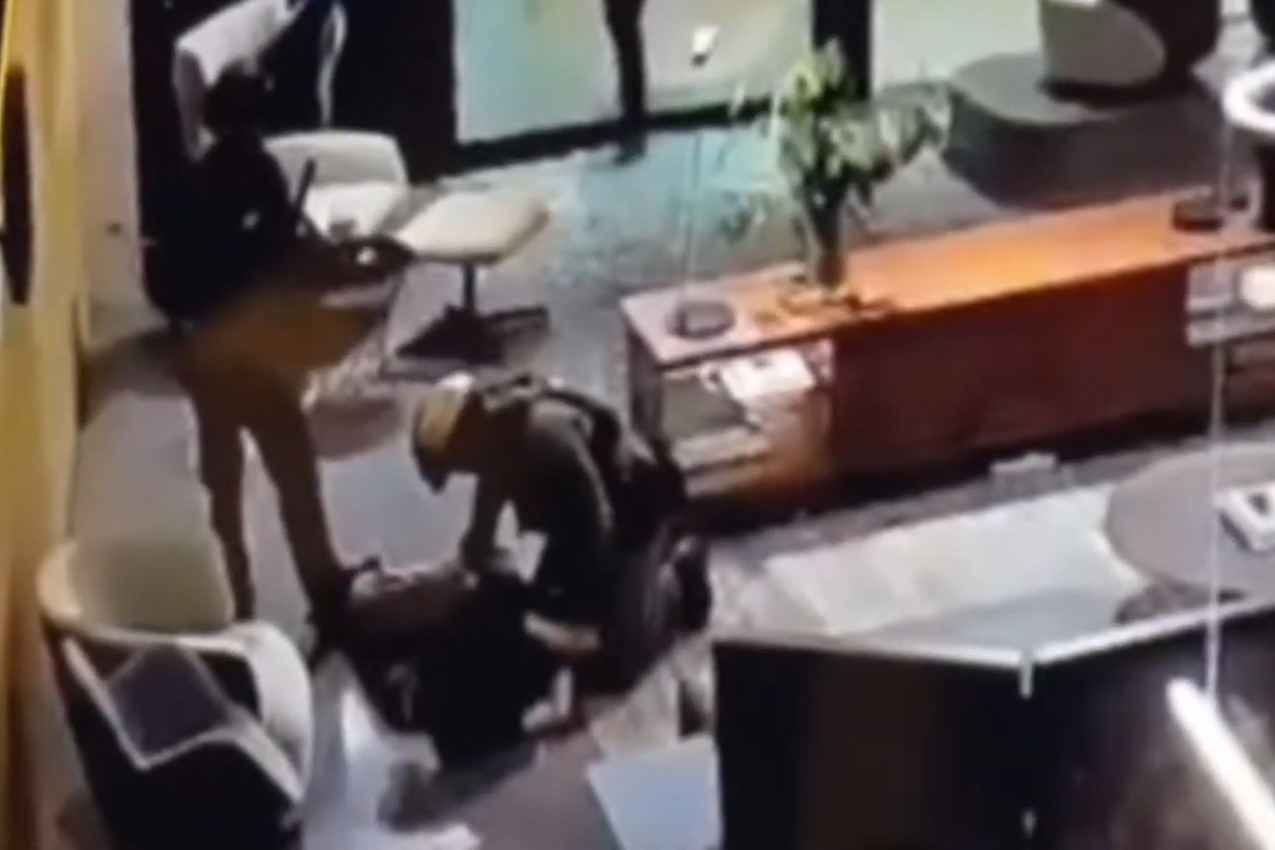
- CCTV footage showing the suspected gunman being detained by police
- Location: Siam Paragon; 991 Rama I Road, Pathum Wan; Bangkok 10330, Thailand
- Date: 3 October 2023; 4:10 p.m. – 5:10 p.m. (UTC+7)
- Attack type: Mass shooting
- Weapon: Converted 9mm blank gun (Glock 19 model)
- Deaths: 3
- Injuries: 4
- Perpetrator: Phasid Trutassanawin

On 3 October 2023, at 4:10 p.m., a mass shooting occurred at the Siam Paragon mall in Bangkok, the capital of Thailand. The suspected gunman, a 14-year-old male teenager, was arrested after surrendering to the police. The teen, who attended a school that was near the mall, was armed with a modified blank pistol, which he used to fatally shoot a Burmese worker and a Chinese tourist, and injure five others. A Thai woman succumbed to her wounds on 13 October 2023, becoming the third fatality from this incident.

== Background ==
Gun ownership rates in Thailand are relatively high for Southeast Asia. Estimates put the number of civilian gun owners in the country at more than 10.34 million, while only 6.22 million guns are legally registered. Thailand also has the second-highest number of gun homicides in Southeast Asia. However, indiscriminate mass shootings are rare, though there have been high-profile cases in recent years. In 2020, a soldier killed 29 people in Nakhon Ratchasima, and in 2022, a former policeman killed 36 people in a gun and knife attack at a childcare centre in Nong Bua Lamphu province.

The Siam Paragon Mall is among the best-known shopping centres in Bangkok and is popular with both locals and tourists alike. The mall was named the most photographed place by Instagram in 2013, and features high-end stores, an aquarium, and a movie theater.

== Events ==
According to Matichon, the suspect had arrived at Siam BTS station at 3:35 p.m. (UTC+7). He entered the mall and went into a toilet at G Floor at 3:42 p.m.

The shooting took place at approximately 4:10 p.m. local time. Police also said the suspect had modified a blank gun to fire live rounds. Police and mall security began evacuating employees and customers at around 4:45 p.m., while other occupants went into hiding across the mall.

According to the niece of one of the killed women, her aunt and two other women were shot outside the female bathroom while the niece and her aunt's three daughters hid in the toilet cubicles. According to Matichon, a social media post by a Thai woman who was in Siam Paragon at the time claimed she had aided one of the daughters and sheltered her in a nearby store afterwards.

Police caught up with a 14-year-old suspect at the third floor of the Siam Kempinski Hotel, located at the rear of the mall.

The suspect, who reportedly surrendered as he had run out of bullets, was then arrested by the police at 5:10 p.m. Images of the arrest showed the suspect to be a long-haired teenage boy wearing glasses, a dark shirt, khaki cargo pants, and a baseball cap with an American flag on it. The suspect did not resist arrest and reportedly used a handgun and had ammunition on him at the time of his arrest.

The assailant fired 40 or more rounds off during his attack, 11 of which struck people, and there was property damage throughout the mall.

== Victims ==
The two women killed in the shooting were named as 34-year-old Zhao Jinnan, a Chinese tourist, and 31-year-old Moe Myint, a Burmese employee of a mall toy store who was killed by a bullet that struck her heart and lung. Five injuries were reported, including another Chinese tourist, a Lao national and three Thais. Among the five injured, 30-year old Penpiwan Mitthampitak, who was shot twice in the head and twice in the torso, became the third fatality from the incident, succumbing to her wounds 10 days after the shooting.

Because 6 out of the 7 people who were shot were women, some suspect that the attacker was targeting women.

== Suspect ==
The suspect Phasid Trutassanawin (born September 21, 2009; Thai: พสิษฐ์ ตรูทัศนวินท์) was detained at Pathum Wan police station. Police chief Torsak Sukvimol said the suspect attended a school near the mall, taking IGCSEs and had received treatment for a mental health condition at Rajavithi Hospital, but had recently stopped taking his medication, adding that the suspect was "too confused to undergo questioning". The suspect claimed someone was "telling him who to shoot" and that he opened fire because he believed someone was about to attack him. He declined to discuss further details as the suspect was a minor. This was corroborated by the director of The Essence, a private alternative secondary school located metres away from the mall, who confirmed that the suspect was one of its students.

In school, Phasid did not have good grades, was bullied, and often sent videos to his parents of himself firing guns at a firing range when his parents pressured him about his grades. Phasid shared some photos with tactical vest imitating American mass shooters in a true crime server in Discord.

== Legal proceedings ==
On 4 October, Phasid was charged on six counts of criminal offences, namely premeditated murder, attempted murder, possessing a firearm without permission, carrying a firearm into a public area without permission and shooting in a public area without permission. A doctor said that he was "not in a state to be interrogated". He was later transferred to a juvenile detention center. Police also arrested three people on suspicion of selling the firearm and ammunition to the suspect after phone records revealed that the latter had been in contact with them a month before the shooting. The men were arrested in police raids in Bangkok and in Yala Province, where several blank guns, hundreds of blank bullets and gun barrels were discovered. In December, the officers who filed the five of the initial criminal charges against Phasid were later reprimanded for beginning interrogation before a psychiatric assessment could judge whether Phasid was mentally fit, due to which the interrogation was not accepted by the public prosecutor's office. The criminal charges were subsequently rescinded until the psychiatric assessment was completed.

In 2024, the Central Juvenile and Family Court ordered Phasid to attend a three-to-five year rehabilitation program at Galya Rajanagarindra Institute, which as of August 2026, attested to good progress and no apparent risk. The Department of Juvenile Observation and Protection will decide over potential release in 2027.

== Aftermath ==
Siam Paragon mall was temporarily closed due to the incident. Siam BTS station, which is located adjacent to the mall, was also temporarily closed at around 4:40 p.m. local time in connection with the incident. Officers were seen blocking access to the exits leading to Siam Paragon and Siam Discovery, forcing commuters to use the sole remaining exit leading to Siam Square. The station reopened less than an hour later at 5:20 p.m. Elsewhere, medical evacuation of the victims was hampered by the evening rush-hour traffic and flooding caused by torrential rains.

The Siam Paragon opened for business as usual the following day, with Prime Minister Srettha Thavisin joining a minute's silence at the mall before reiterating the government's condolences. However, the mall, which normally sees throngs of crowds, was described as "relatively empty".

The Crown Prince of Johor, Tunku Ismail ibni Sultan Ibrahim, his wife, Che’ Puan Besar Khaleeda, and their four children, were sitting in a hotel lobby near the mall, when the shooting occurred. The family immediately ran to the hotel's basement for safety, using their security team as a human shield. When Ismail requested to be driven to the Malaysian embassy, the driver told him that the Singaporean embassy was closer, and thus the family was driven to there to seek shelter. Ismail was subsequently taken to the airport to return to Johor. He described the mass shooting incident as "the worst experience" he had ever gone through.

== Reaction ==
Prime Minister Srettha Thavisin expressed his condolences and concern over the incident and ordered the police to conduct an investigation. He also issued an apology to the Chinese ambassador Han Zhiqiang for the deaths and injuries of its citizens in the incident. A spokesperson for the Siam Paragon Mall said that it expressed its deepest condolences to the victims and expressed its thanks at the police and security guards’ response.

Tourism Minister Sudawan Wangsuphakijkosol emphasised that the shooting was an isolated incident, and that Thailand would take steps to ensure the safety of tourists in Thailand. The director of The Essence school invited parents and students who were affected by the incident to make an appointment with him.

On 6 October, the Thai Foreign Ministry released a statement from the suspect's family signed by the suspect's father in which they accepted responsibility over the incident and apologized on behalf of their relative's actions, while pledging to cooperate with the police investigation.

== See also ==
- 2026 Nonthaburi shootings, another mass shooting perpetrated by a 14-year-old in Thailand
