= Firearms in Thailand =

Firearms in Thailand refers to the number and types of firearms in the country in civilian (unofficial) hands and the laws and societal norms that govern their possession and use.

About one in ten people in Thailand legally own a gun. There are more than six million registered guns in a country with a population of 66.7 million. Small Arms Survey estimates that the total number of guns, both licit and illicit, held by Thai civilians in 2017 is 10,300,000, equating to 15.1 firearms per 100 inhabitants. Figures for the other ASEAN nations are Cambodia, 4.5 per 100 inhabitants; Philippines, 3.6; Laos, 3.0; Myanmar, 1.6; Vietnam, 1.6; Brunei, 1.4; Malaysia, 0.7; Singapore, 0.3; and Indonesia, zero.

Ownership of firearms is particularly high in the southern provinces of Pattani, Yala, and Narathiwat that have witnessed significant insurgency and rebellion since 2004.

== Gun laws ==
The Thai laws applicable to firearms regulation are the Firearms, Ammunition, Explosives, Fireworks, and Imitation Firearms Act, B.E. 2490 (1947) and Amendments to the Act Controlling Firearms, Ammunition, Explosives, Fireworks and Imitation of Firearms, B.E. 2490 (2017).

Gun ownership in Thailand is restricted to Thai citizens.

== Violent gun deaths ==
In 2016 Thailand's rate of violent gun-related deaths stood at 4.45 deaths per 100,000 inhabitants. In comparison, that of the Philippines was 7.42; the US, 3.85; Cambodia, 0.96; Myanmar, 0.56; Malaysia, 0.46; Indonesia, 0.10; and Singapore, 0.03.

== See also ==
- Crime in Thailand
- Estimated number of civilian guns per capita by country
- Gun ownership
- Overview of gun laws by nation

Events

- 2020 Nakhon Ratchasima shootings
- 2022 Nong Bua Lamphu massacre
- 2023 Siam Paragon shooting
- 2026 Nonthaburi shootings
