= Foodland =

Foodland may refer to:

== Supermarket chains ==
- FoodLand, eastern U.S.
- Foodland (Canada)
- Foodland (South Australia)
- Foodland (Thailand)
- Foodland Hawaii

== Others ==
- Foodland (film), a Canadian film
- Foodland Ontario, a consumer food promotion program
