= Sulak Sivaraksa =

Thai writer and social activist (born 1933)

- สุลักษณ์ ศิวรักษ์
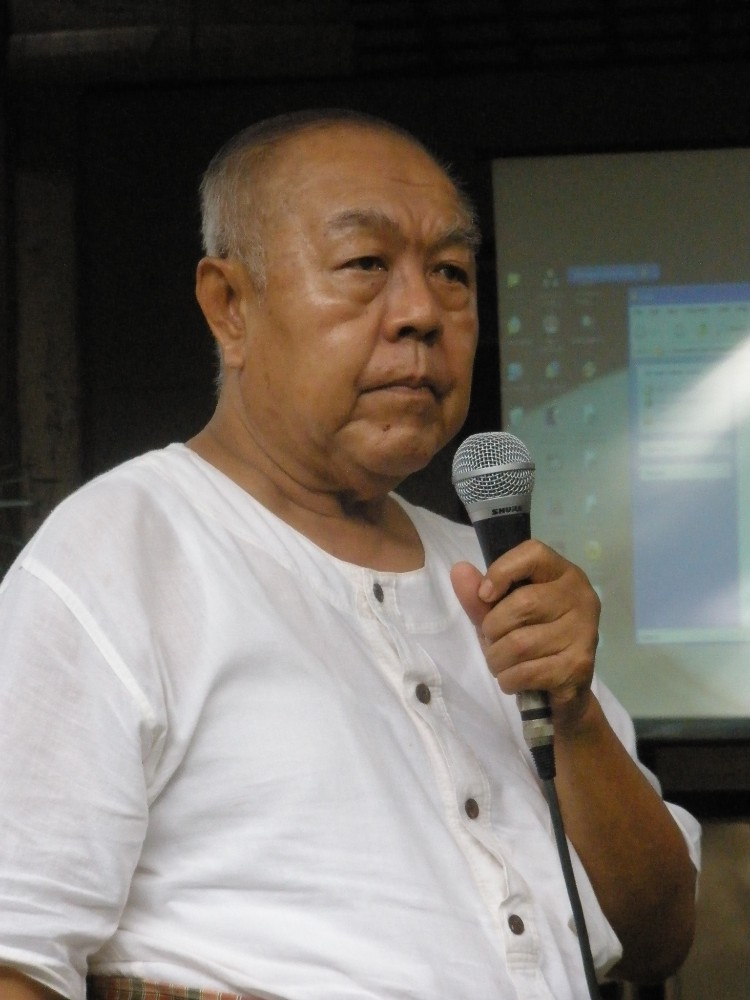
- Sulak in 2009
- Born: 27 March 1933 (age 93); Bangkok, Siam
- Occupations: NGO director, writer
- Known for: Social activism, Philosophy
- Awards: Right Livelihood Award (1995); Niwano Peace Prize (2011)

Sulak Sivaraksa (Thai: สุลักษณ์ ศิวรักษ์, pronounced [sù.lák sì.wá.rák]; RTGS: Sulak Siwarak; born 27 March 1933) is a Thai social activist, philosopher, professor, writer and the founder and director of the Thai NGO "Sathirakoses-Nagapradeepa Foundation", named after two authorities on Thai culture, Sathirakoses (Phya Anuman Rajadhon) and Nagapradeepa (Phra Saraprasoet). He initiated a number of social, humanitarian, ecological and spiritual movements and organizations in Thailand, such as the College SEM (Spirit in Education Movement).

Sulak Sivaraksa is known in the West as one of the fathers of the International Network of Engaged Buddhists (INEB), which was established in 1989 with leading Buddhists, including the 14th Dalai Lama, the Vietnamese monk and peace-activist Thich Nhat Hanh, and the Theravada Bhikkhu Maha Ghosananda, as its patrons.

When Sulak Sivaraksa was awarded the Right Livelihood Award in 1995 for "his vision, activism and spiritual commitment in the quest for a development process that is rooted in democracy, justice and cultural integrity", he became known to a wider public in Europe and the US. Sulak was chair of the Asian Cultural Forum on Development and has been a visiting professor at UC Berkeley, the University of Toronto, and Cornell.

== Life ==
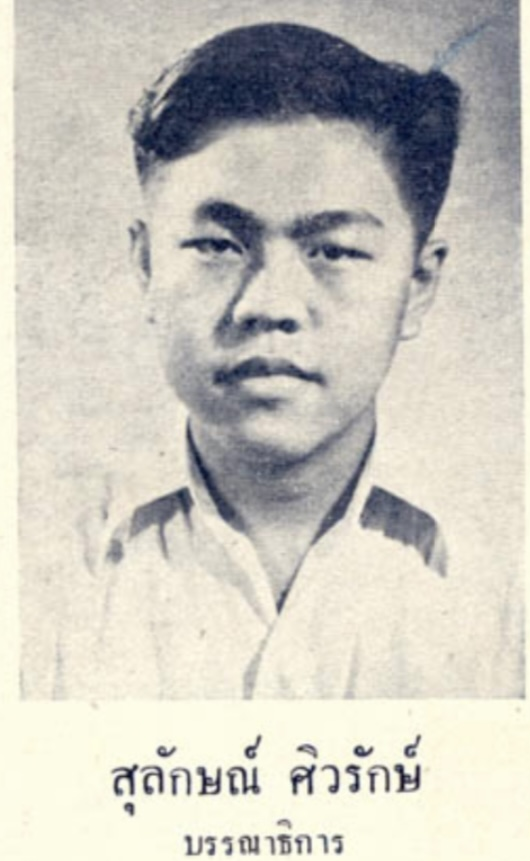
Sivaraksa as an editor of Assumption College (Thailand)'s periodic, circa 1952

The grandson of a Chinese immigrant whose surname was Lim and born into an affluent Teochew Sino-Thai family, Sulak Sivaraksa was educated at Assumption College in Bangkok and at the University of Wales, Lampeter, where he is now an honorary fellow in Buddhism. He passed the Bar in London in 1961. Upon his return home, he became the editor of Social Science Review magazine. Many considered it the leading Thai intellectual journal of its time. By 1968 the Social Science Review had become "the intellectual voice of the nation". Also in 1968, Sulak founded the Sathirakoses-Nagapradipa Foundation (SNF), which publishes "the intellectual successor" to Social Science Review and acts as an umbrella organization for a group of NGOs. Soon after his return to Thailand, he directed his energies towards the development of sustainable models for a rapidly changing economic and social environment. The military coup of 1976 forced him into exile for two years. At this time he toured Canada, the US, and Europe to lecture academic audiences. Because of the coup, Sulak's commitment to peace was strengthened. Since then he has championed nonviolence in war torn and repressed countries like Sri Lanka. His devotion to peace and nonviolence is demonstrated by his leadership and membership in international peace organizations like Buddhist Peace Fellowship, Peace Brigade International, and Gandhi Peace Foundation. After he returned to Thailand, Sulak was prompted to establish the Thai Inter-religious Commission for Development (TICD), and soon thereafter Sulak was appointed chairperson of the Asian Cultural Forum on Development (ACFOD) and the editor of its newsletter, Asia Action. In 1982, Sulak established the Thai Development Support Committee as a way to coordinate other nongovernmental organizations to better tackle large problems that they could not tackle alone.

The foreign contacts he made while in exile proved beneficial when Sivaraksa was arrested in 1984 for lèse majesté, causing international protests which pressured the government to release him. Sivaraksa was again charged with lèse majesté in September 1991 after a talk he gave at Thammasat University about the repression of democracy in Thailand. Sivaraksa fled the county and went into exile until he was able to convince the courts of his innocence in 1995. He was awarded the Swedish Right Livelihood Award in 1995, the UNPO (Unrepresented Nations and Peoples Organization) Award in 1998, and the Indian Millennium Gandhi Award in 2001. He was nominated for the Nobel Peace Prize by the American Friends Service Committee in 1994.

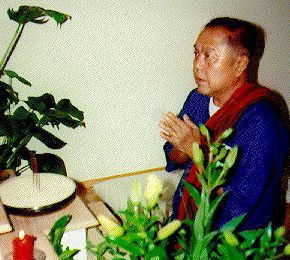
Sulak Sivaraksa at the Buddhistischen Zentrum, Salzburg, 1999.

Sulak was a strong critic of deposed Thai Prime Minister Thaksin Shinawatra. He publicly accused Thaksin of adultery at rallies organized by the People's Alliance for Democracy. However, he has never cited any evidence for his claims. During a protest on 26 February 2006, Sulak called Thaksin a pitiful dog. Sulak's comments were condemned by Somsri Hananantasuk, former Chairperson of Amnesty International Thailand, who said that such words could provoke violence.

In 2007, he spoke out against proposals to declare Buddhism Thailand's "national religion" in the new constitution, arguing that to do so would exacerbate the existing conflict in southern Thailand.

Sulak Sivaraksa also appears in the documentary film about the Dalai Lama entitled Dalai Lama Renaissance.

Sulak Sivaraksa is an advocate for social and political change in Thailand, as well as globally. Sivaraksa has written several influential works that have both inspired people to work towards justice and provoked controversy from political leaders. Nonetheless, Sulak Sivaraksa's speeches and other writings discuss political and economic corruption in Thai government, universal ethics, and socially engaged Buddhism. Some of Sivaraksa's most influential works include his autobiography, Loyalty Demands Dissent, as well as Seeds of Peace: A Buddhist Vision for Renewing Society, and Conflict, Culture, Change: Engaged Buddhism in a Globalizing World. Sulak Sivaraksa's writings, as well the organizations he has created, express his desire for a moral and ethical world from a Buddhist perspective. Sivaraksa's religious faith is clearly the foundation of all of his political and social beliefs, yet he uses his religious beliefs to create social change in a modernist fashion.

Sulak was arrested on 6 November 2009 for lèse majesté. He was bailed out shortly thereafter.

In 2014 Sulak was again charged with defamation of the monarchy after questioning the historicity of a 16th-century royal duel on elephantback. He was cleared of these charges in December 2017.

In a 2019 interview with The Isaan Record, Sulak expressed his disappointment with the government of Prayut Chan-o-cha, but saw great promise in the rise of new progressive parties.

== Books ==
=== Loyalty Demands Dissent ===
Sulak Sivaraksa presents his view of Buddhism is his autobiography, Loyalty Demands Dissent. Along with a first hand account of this life, he also includes information about his views on the relationship between religion, society, and politics. Two chapters in his autobiography, "Interfaith Connections" and "Working with the Monks", discuss Buddhism's relationships with other religions and also the changes in Buddhism that he believes are necessary for it to apply to the modern world.

=== Interfaith Connections ===
An important aspect of Sulak's work as an engaged Buddhist is his focus on inter-religious dialogue. Spending some of his early years in Great Britain enabled him to present Buddhism in a way that is congruent with Western logic. His concern for social change as a religious matter moved him to found the Coordinating Group for Religion and Society (CGRS) in 1976, which included Buddhist men, but also students, women, Catholics, Muslims, and Protestants. While many had religious backgrounds, Sulak has stressed the fact that they were all just people who were coming together to discuss social change.

Sulak's commitment to inter-religious dialogue has been important throughout his life. Sulak established a relationship with the World Council of Churches (WCC) and believed that there was much work to be done within society by Buddhists and Catholics together. When discussing the dialogue between Buddhists and Catholics, Sulak states "the idea that one religion is better than the other simply doesn't exist". This perspective concentrates on the work that needs to be done in society by people of all faiths.

=== Working with the Monks ===
With growing concern about communism in Asia in the early-1960s, Sulak received funding in 1962 to promote a reform of Buddhism as an alternative means to social change. He traveled to monasteries where he encouraged the monks' education in higher institutions of learning so that they would be "concerned about conservation, peace, and society", because he writes, "our monasteries had to become more modern, and our monks needed to understand the West. We can't keep Buddhism as it is. It has to change to meet the modern world".

In a movement to modernize monasticism, Sulak began a group named sekhiyadhamma in order to increase social awareness among monks. Sulak claims that he relied heavily on the ideas of Buddhadasa Bhikkhu and Bhikkhu P. A. Payutto in forming his own ideas. While Buddhadasa Bhikku advocated a theory of Dhammic socialism, Payutto's main focus in Buddhism was studying the original teachings of the Buddha and making them more applicable to the modern world.

=== Seeds of Peace: A Buddhist Vision for Renewing Society ===
==== "Buddhism with a small 'b'" ====
In "Buddhism with a Small 'b'" in Seeds of Peace, Sulak discusses the seminal teachings of the Buddha. He presents mindfulness, tolerance, and interconnectedness in a way that makes them applicable not only to the individual, but to entire communities. "Buddhism with a Small 'b'" seems to call for a religion that is not institutionalized or concerned with ritual, myth, and culture. Sulak feels that these dimensions of religion lead to chauvinism and prejudice, so he believes humans must step away from these and focus on the basic teachings of the Buddha.

Sulak advocates a return to the Buddha's original teachings as a means of social reform. In addition, he believes that the social dimension of Buddhism cannot be ignored because Buddhism is "concerned with the lives and consciousness of all beings". Sivaraksa also explains that many Buddhists understand religion and politics "as two interrelated spheres", implying that government should adhere to the moral and ethical values that Buddhism, or any religion, has to offer.

=== Conflict, Culture, Change: Engaged Buddhism in a Globalizing World ===
==== "Buddhist Solutions to Global Conflict" ====
In a chapter on Buddhist solutions to global conflict in Conflict, Culture, Change: Engaged Buddhism in a Globalizing World, Sulak Sivaraksa explains the principle of nonviolence in the teachings of Buddhism. Sulak describes the three forms of violence according to the Buddha's teachings, "Every action has three doors, or three ways we create karma: through body, speech, and mind". Sulak explains that nonviolence, or ahimsa, does not mean non-action. For example, if a person sees a violent act and does not attempt to prevent it, this can be considered an act of violence because the bystander is not acting with compassion.

Sulak applies these ideas to social and political situations as a response to social injustice. He uses the principle of nonviolence as a call for action against social injustice, defining a strategy to bringing about long-term peace to the world: peacemaking, peacekeeping, and peace building. Sulak's application of Buddhist principles show his intention of instilling morals and ethics into corrupt institutions around the world.

== Socially engaged Buddhism ==
Socially Engaged Buddhism advocates religion as a means of reform. He states, "Religion is at the heart of social change, and social change is the essence of religion". Sulak advocates environmental protection and environmentally sustainable ways of life through the use of Buddhist principles. Sivaraksa calls for the "value of simplicity", and connects this with the Buddhist idea of "the freedom from attachment to physical and sensual pleasure".

Sivaraksa chooses to highlight the universal and rational aspects of Buddhism and eschews ritualism and mythology in order to make Buddhism more applicable to contemporary global issues. By presenting Buddhism in this fashion, people of all faiths can relate to, and interpret his work in a universally spiritual light. Though he is both a Buddhist and Thai nationalist, he makes it clear in his work that all religions should be tolerated and respected.

== Works ==
- — (1975). A Socially Engaged Buddhism. Thai Inter-Religious Commission for Development.
- — (1987). Religion and Development. Thai Inter-Religious Commission for Development.
- — (1990). Siam in crisis: A Collection of Articles. Santi Pracha Dhamma Institute.
- — (1992). Seeds of Peace: A Buddhist Vision for Renewing Society. Parallax Press. ISBN 0-938077-78-3.
- — (1993). Buddhist Perception for Desirable Societies in the Future: Papers prepared for the United Nations University. Thai Inter-Religious Commission for Development.
- — (1994). A Buddhist Vision for Renewing Society: Collected articles. Inter-religious Commission for Development. ISBN 9747493411.
- — (1998). Loyalty Demands Dissent: Autobiography of a Socially Engaged Buddhist. Parallax Press. ISBN 1-888375-10-8.
- — (1999). Global Healing: Essays and Interviews on Structural Violence, Social Development and Spiritual Transformation. Thai Inter-Religious Commission for Development. ISBN 9742601569.
- — (1999). Powers That Be: Pridi Banomyong through the rise and fall of Thai democracy. Committees on Project for National Celebration on the Occasion of the Centennial Anniversary of Pridi Banomyong, Senior Statesman (private sector). ISBN 9747449188.
- — (2005). Conflict, Culture, Change: Engaged Buddhism in a Globalizing World. Wisdom Publications. ISBN 0-86171-498-9.
- — (2010). The Wisdom of Sustainability: Buddhist Economics for the 21st Century. Souvenir Press. ISBN 978-0-9821656-1-4.

== See also ==
- Buddhist economics
- Buddhist ethics
- List of peace activists
