= Siam Paragon =

Shopping mall in Bangkok, Thailand

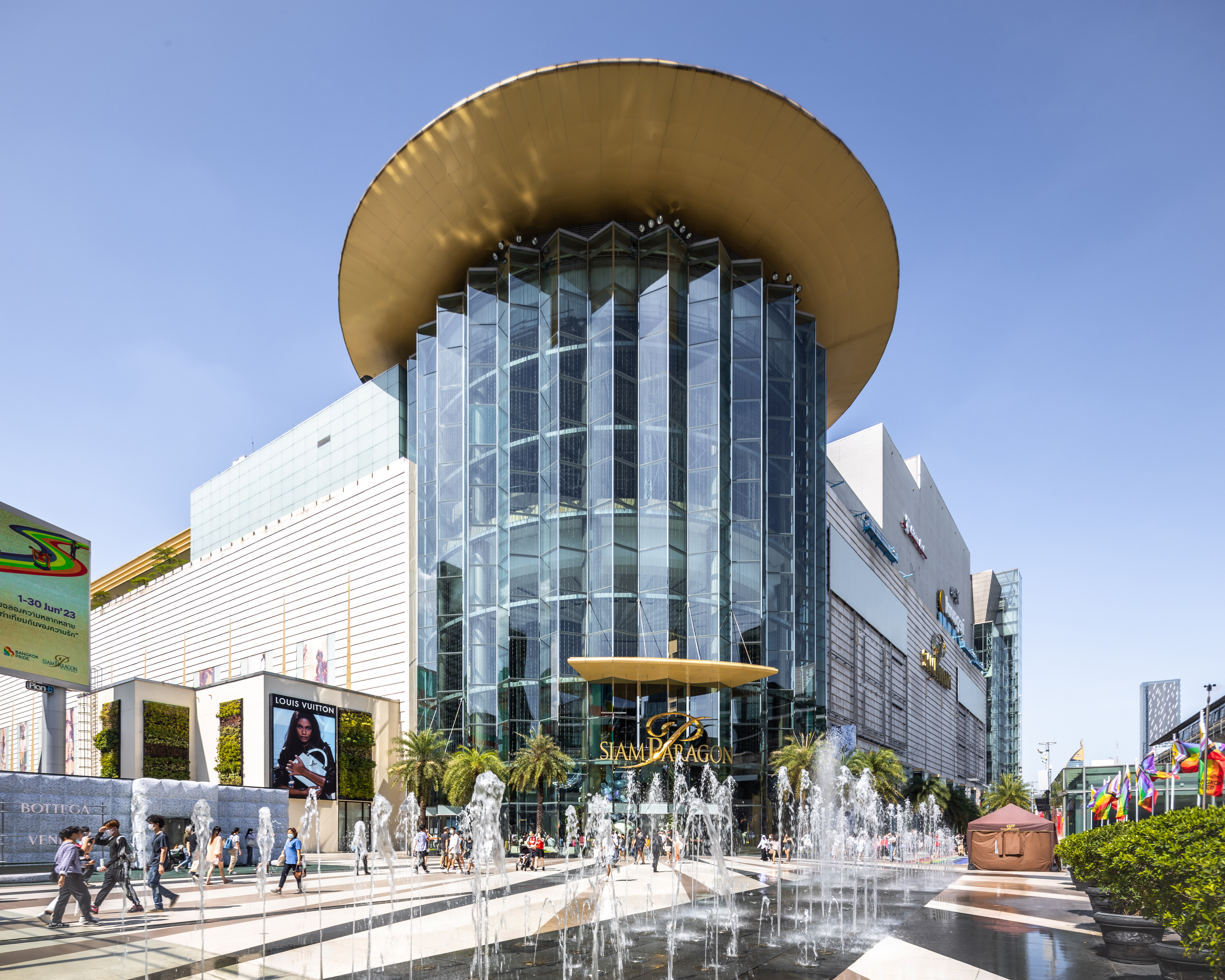
- Siam Paragon, Parc Paragon, and Siam Station in 2023
- Location: 991 Rama I Road, Pathum Wan; Bangkok 10330, Thailand
- Coordinates: 13°44′47″N 100°32′6″E
- Opened: 9 December 2005; 20 years ago
- Manager: Siam Paragon Development by Siam Piwat and The Mall Group
- Owner: Crown Property Bureau (land)
- Architect: J+H Boiffils
- Floor area: 400,000 m^{2} (4,300,000 sq ft) (retail area)
- Floors: 10 (including the underground)
- Parking: 4,000 cars
- Public transit: Siam Station
- Website: www.siamparagon.co.th

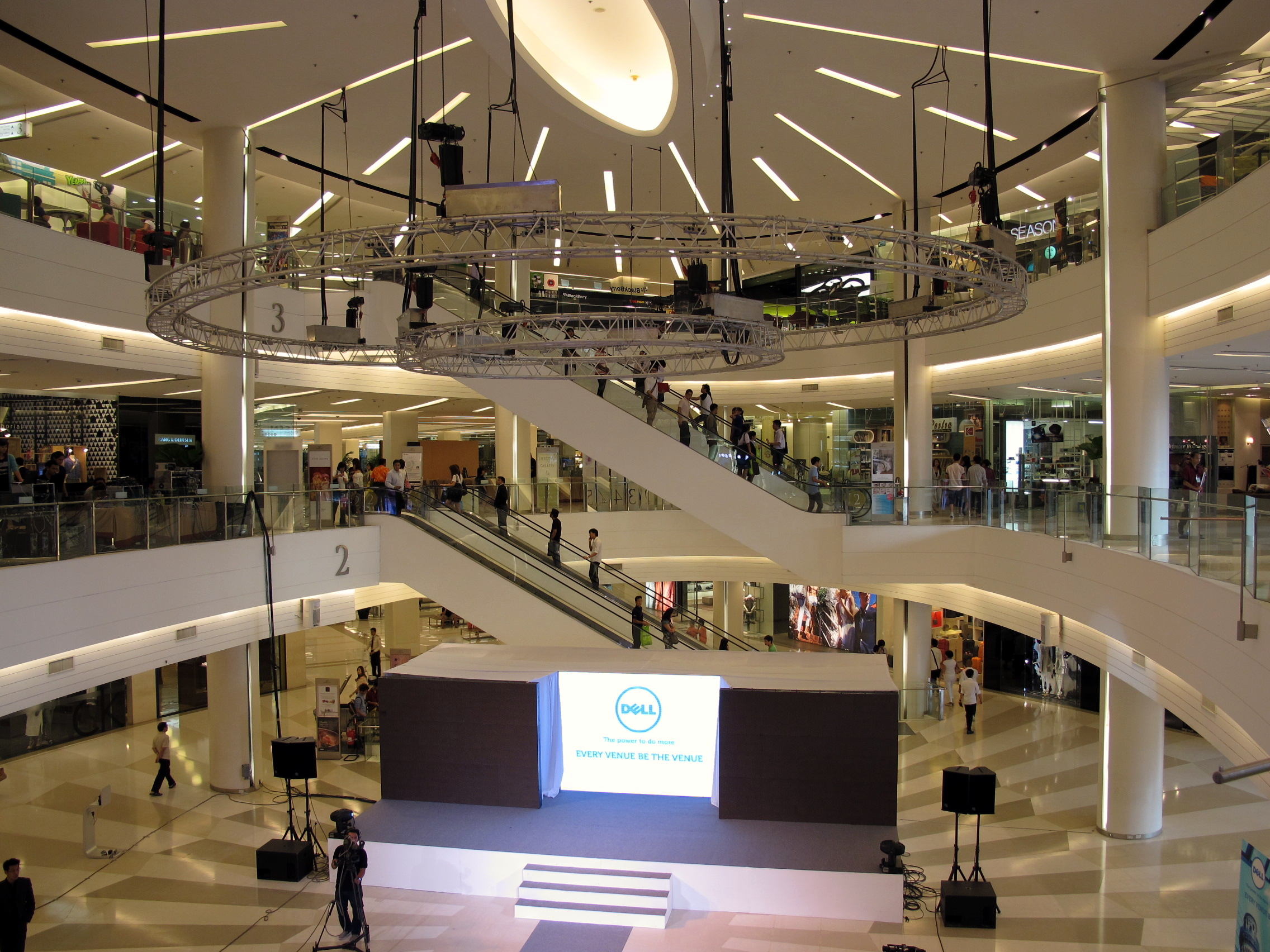
Main Atrium

Siam Paragon (Thai: สยามพารากอน) is a shopping mall in Bangkok, Thailand. It is one of the largest malls in Thailand, along with ICONSIAM. It is located right in front of Siam BTS station, an interchange station on both Sukhumvit Line and Silom Line of the BTS Skytrain.

Siam Paragon includes a range of specialty stores and restaurants as well as a multiplex (16 large-screen cinemas), the Sea Life Bangkok Ocean World aquarium, an exhibition hall, the Thai Art Gallery, and an opera concert hall. It also has a bowling alley and karaoke center. It is a joint venture by Siam Piwat, the company that owns the adjacent Siam Center/Siam Discovery shopping malls, and The Mall Group, which owns The Emporium. Siam Paragon's financial results are not reported by the privately held Siam Paragon Development.

== History ==
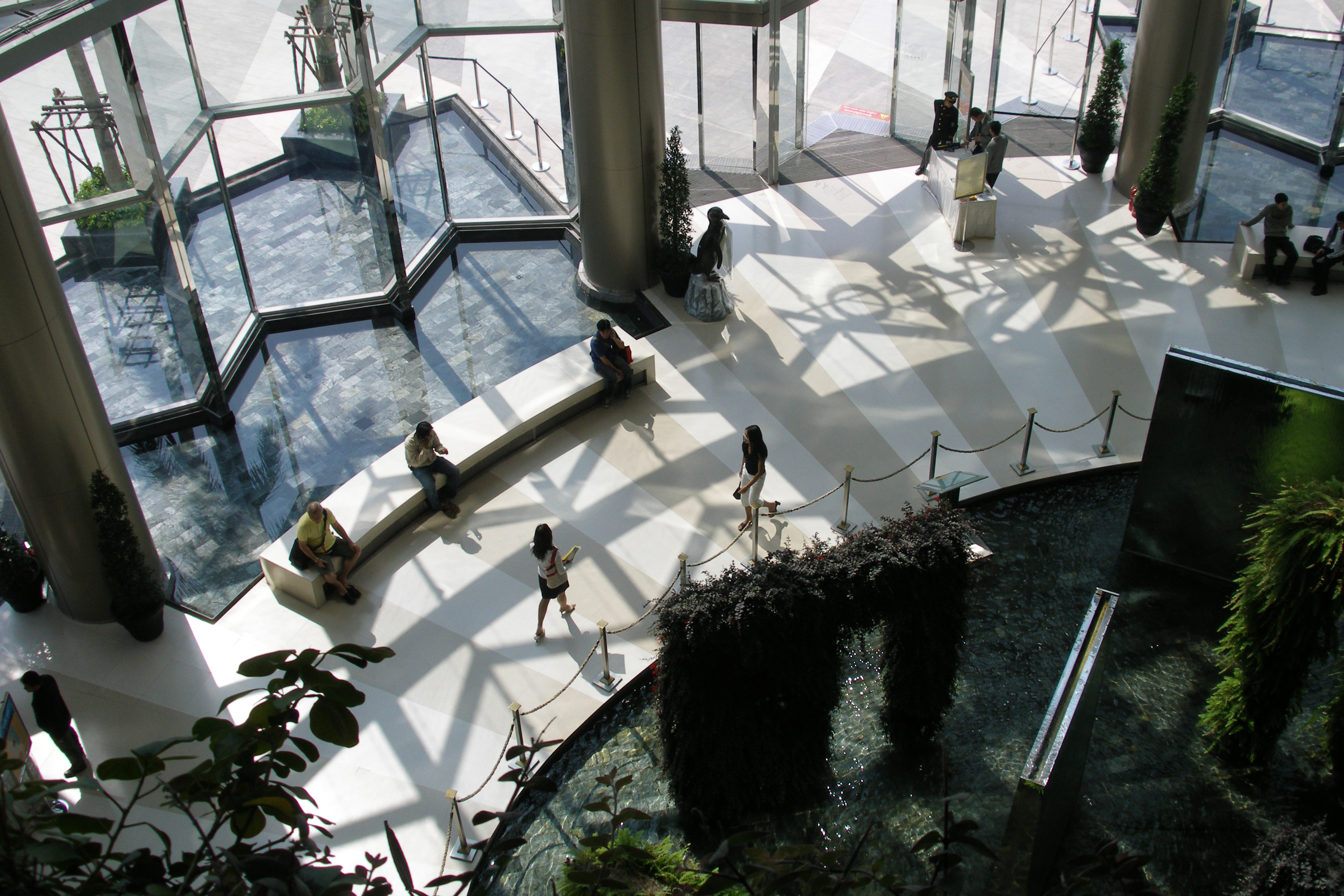
Main entrance from above

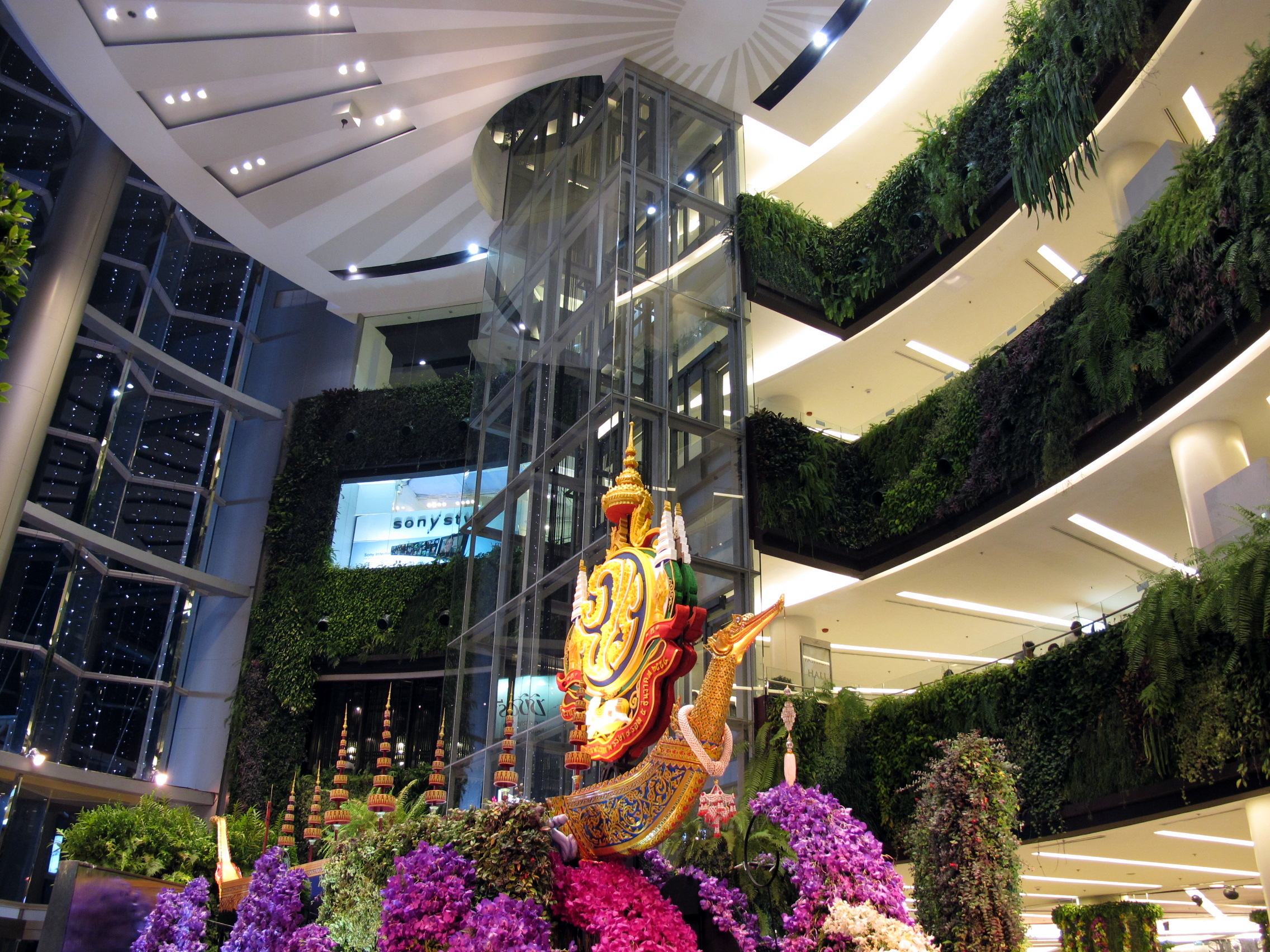
Main entrance void

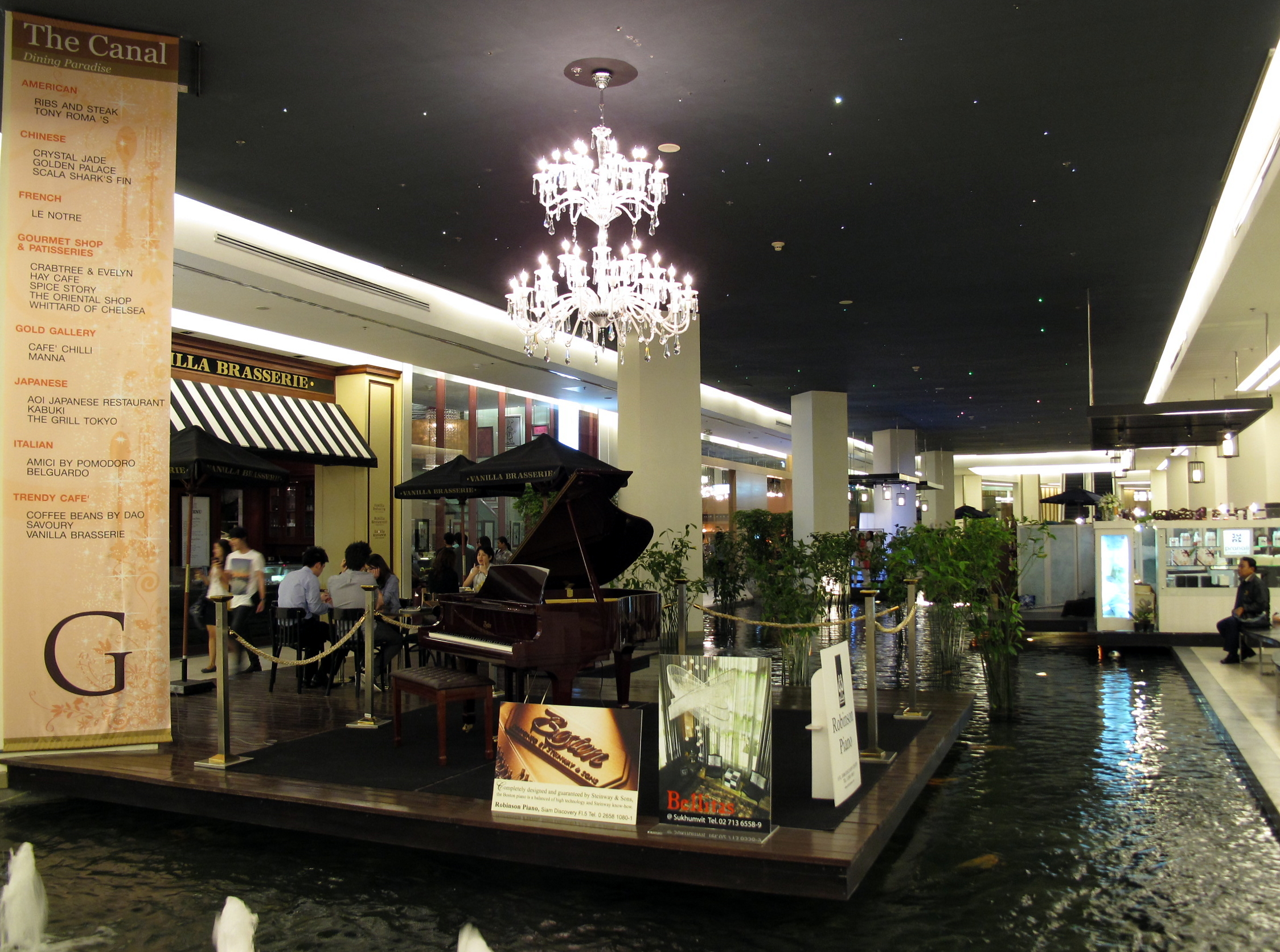
The Canal before renovation in 2016

Siam Paragon was built on the former site of the Siam Intercontinental Hotel, which was demolished in 2002 at the end of its lease. The site, leased for 30 years, is Crown Property Bureau land and at one time was the royal parkland of Sa Pathum Palace. The mall opened on 9 December 2005 at a cost of about 15 billion baht or US$450 million. It covers an area of 52 52 rai (8.3 ha; 21 acres).

=== Incidents ===
On 25 November 2016, a man fell from an escalator traveling from floors M to G, landing on the B floor in front of the Sea Life Bangkok Ocean World. The person died the following day due to his injuries. Investigators said it was likely an accidental fall.

On 3 October 2023, at approximately 4:10 PM, a mass shooting occurred on the first floor of the shopping mall complex. Seven people were injured, two of whom died at the hospital a few minutes later. The deceased victims were a Burmese migrant worker, and a Chinese tourist. Later that day, around 5:10 PM, the police arrested a 14-year-old teenager on the third floor of the complex. The mall was temporarily closed, and the gates, including the connector entrance from the Siam BTS station, were shut down.

== Location ==
Siam Paragon is on Rama I Road in Pathum Wan District, adjacent to other shopping areas. It is next door to Siam Center and Siam Discovery and opposite Siam Square. MBK Center is also nearby. An elevated walkway beneath the BTS Skytrain tracks links Siam Paragon to the Ratchaprasong intersection, where CentralWorld, Gaysorn Village and several other shopping malls and hotels are located.

=== Transportation ===
- BTS Skytrain Sukhumvit and Silom Lines – Siam station has a skybridge linked to Siam Paragon's M floor.
- Parking – 100,000 square metres, accommodating 4,000 cars.

=== Department store and retail shops ===
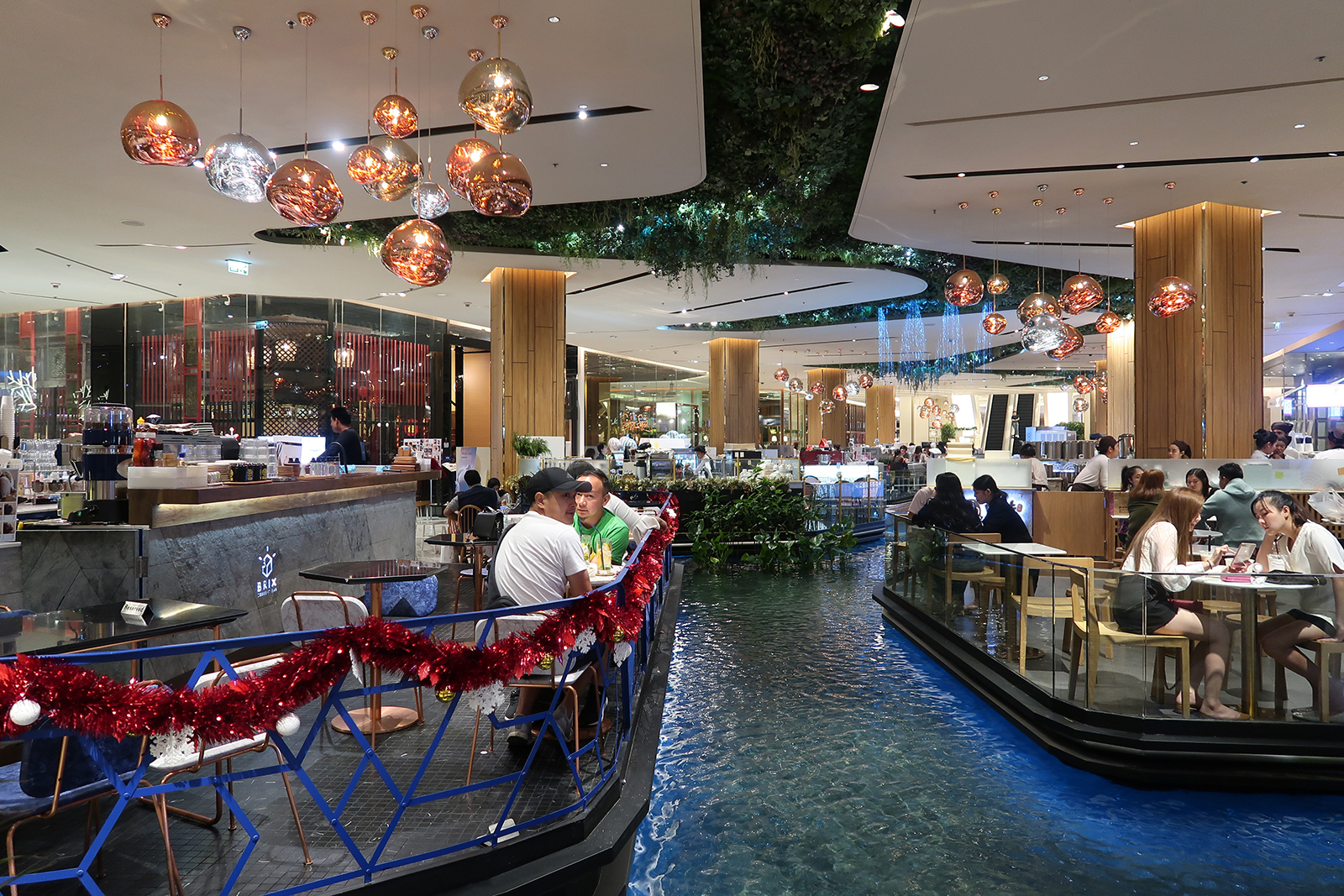
Gourmet Garden in Ground floor completed in 2017

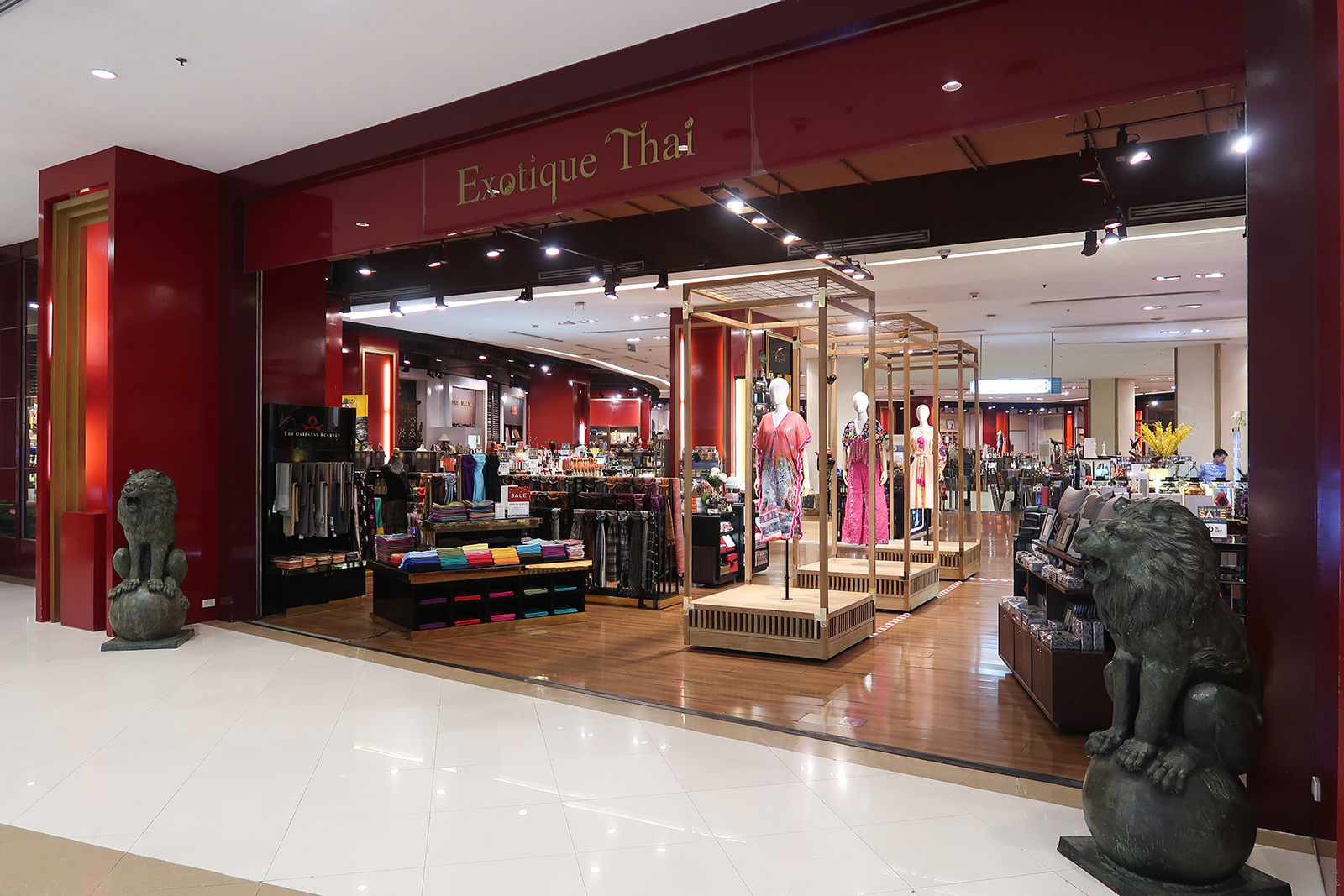
Exotique Thai in Level 4

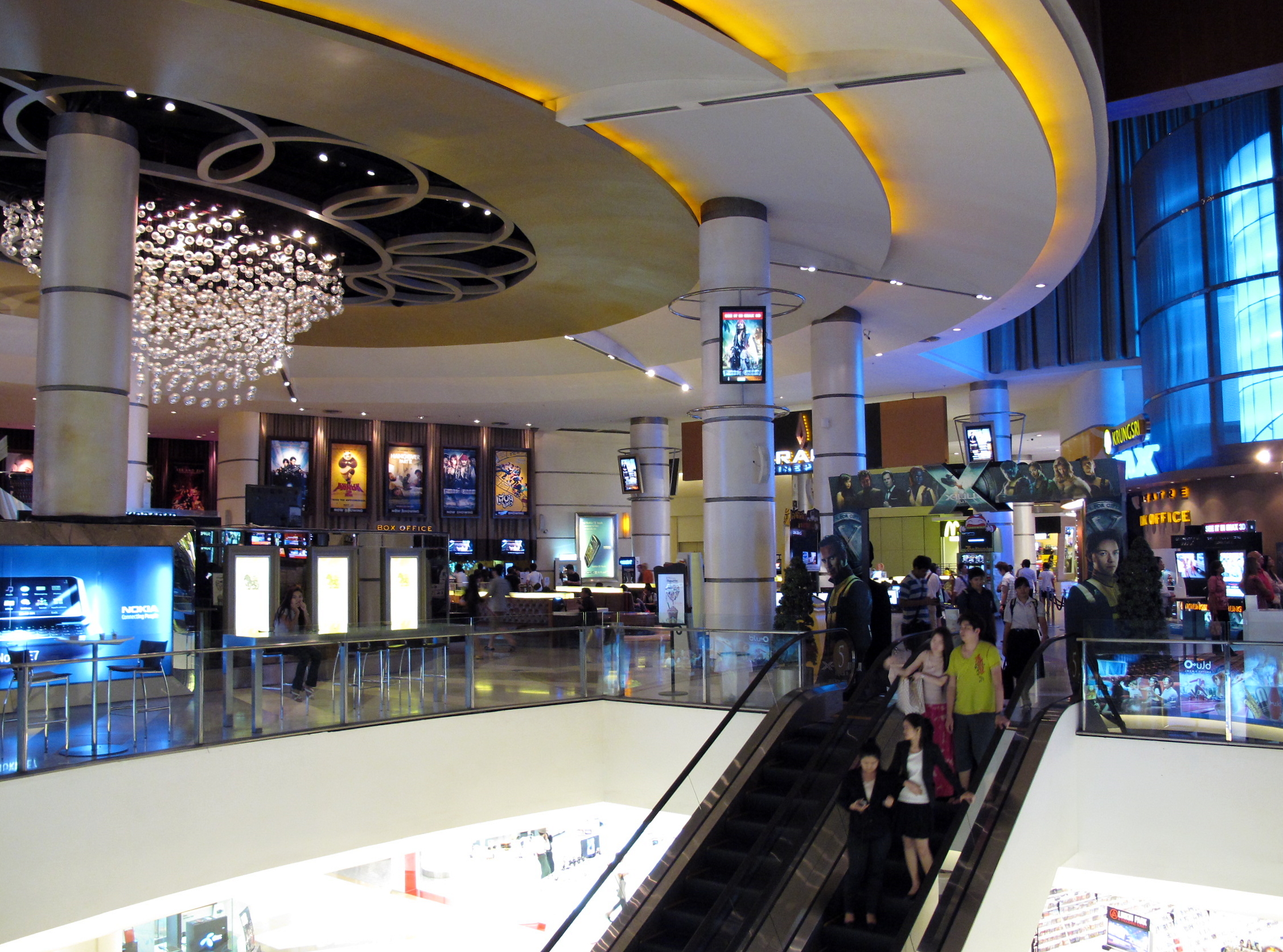
Paragon Cinema in Level 5

The Paragon Department Store occupies 50,000 square metres. Another 40,000 square metres are devoted to retail shops selling goods ranging from apparel to groceries to expensive automobiles.

=== Thai traditional art ===
There is a section of Thai traditional arts shops offering a range of decorative silk, ivory and antique items.

=== Paragon Hall ===
The Paragon Hall is a 12,000-square-metre events facility with a capacity of 5,000 persons, suitable for concerts, conventions, and special exhibitions. Notable artists have performed in this venue includes Kylie Minogue, Kenny Garrett, Ronan Keating, Kool & the Gang, Shinee, Herbie Hancock, Andrea Bocelli, Super Junior D&E, André Rieu, Olivia Newton-John, Kenny Rogers, Bryan Adams, Jeff Satur, GMMTV, Chanyeol, Babymonster, Ten of NCT, and Suho. Vietnamese-language musical variety shows Paris by Night 134 and 136 have also been held here.

=== Hotel ===
The Siam Kempinski Hotel and serviced apartment complex is on a 13 acres (53,000 m^{2}) at the rear of the Siam Paragon property.

== Energy footprint ==
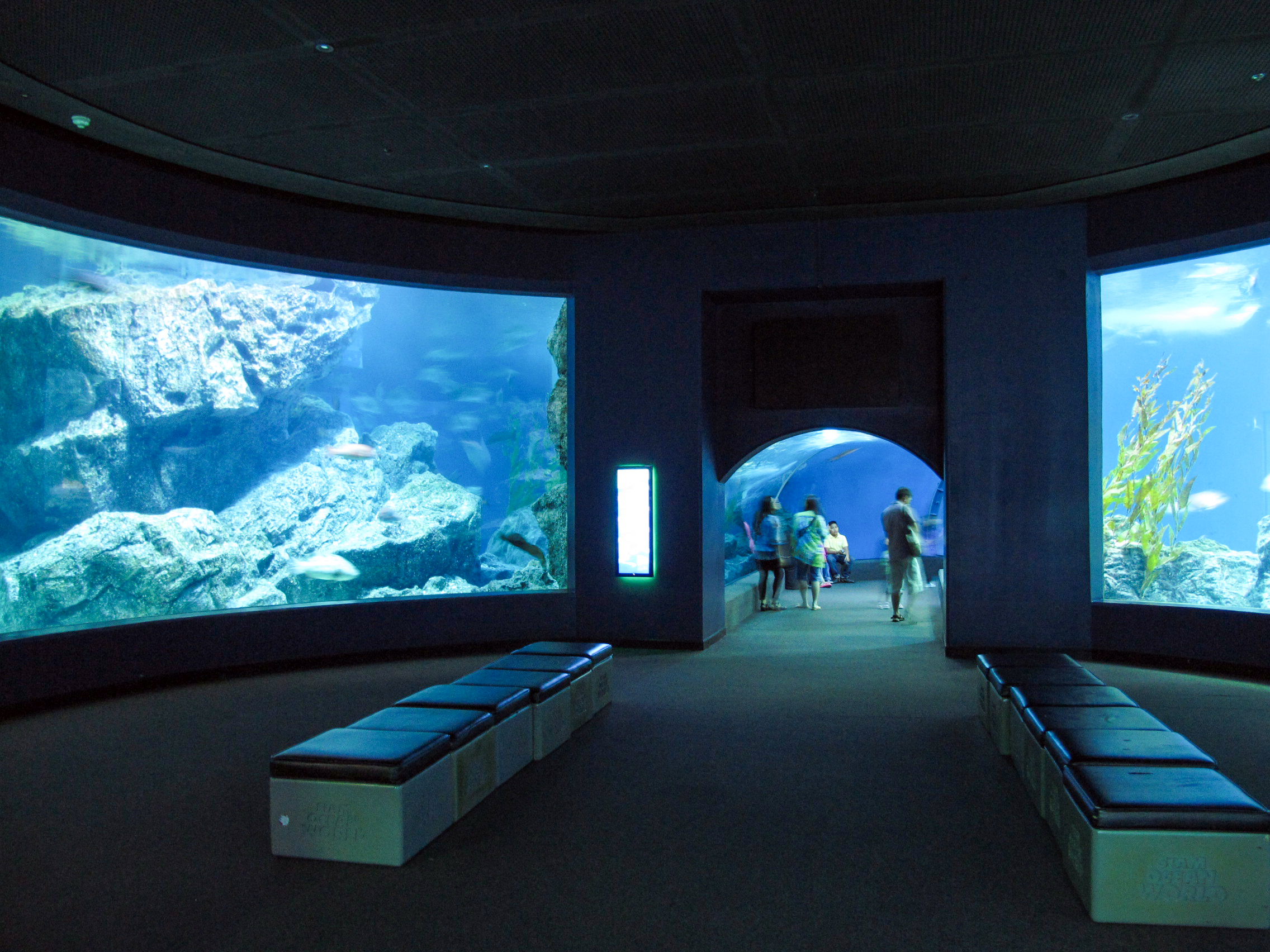
Siam Ocean World

Siam Paragon consumes roughly 123 GWh of electricity a year (2011). By comparison, over the same period, Mae Hong Son province's quarter-million inhabitants used 65 GWh.

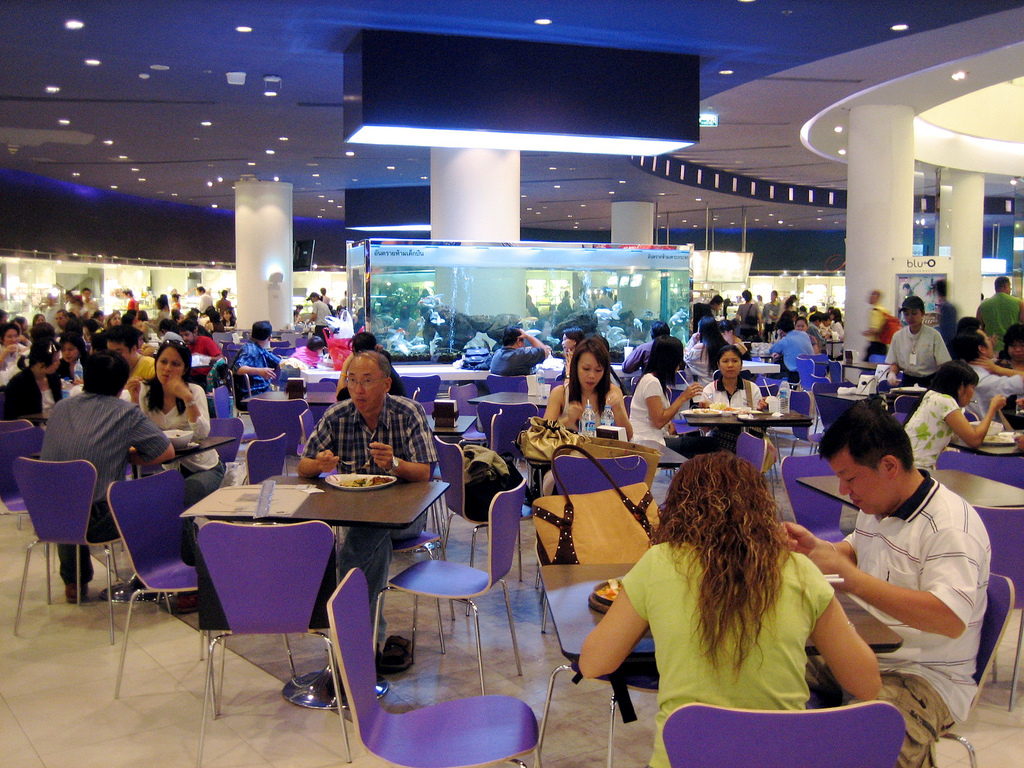
Food Court (2006)

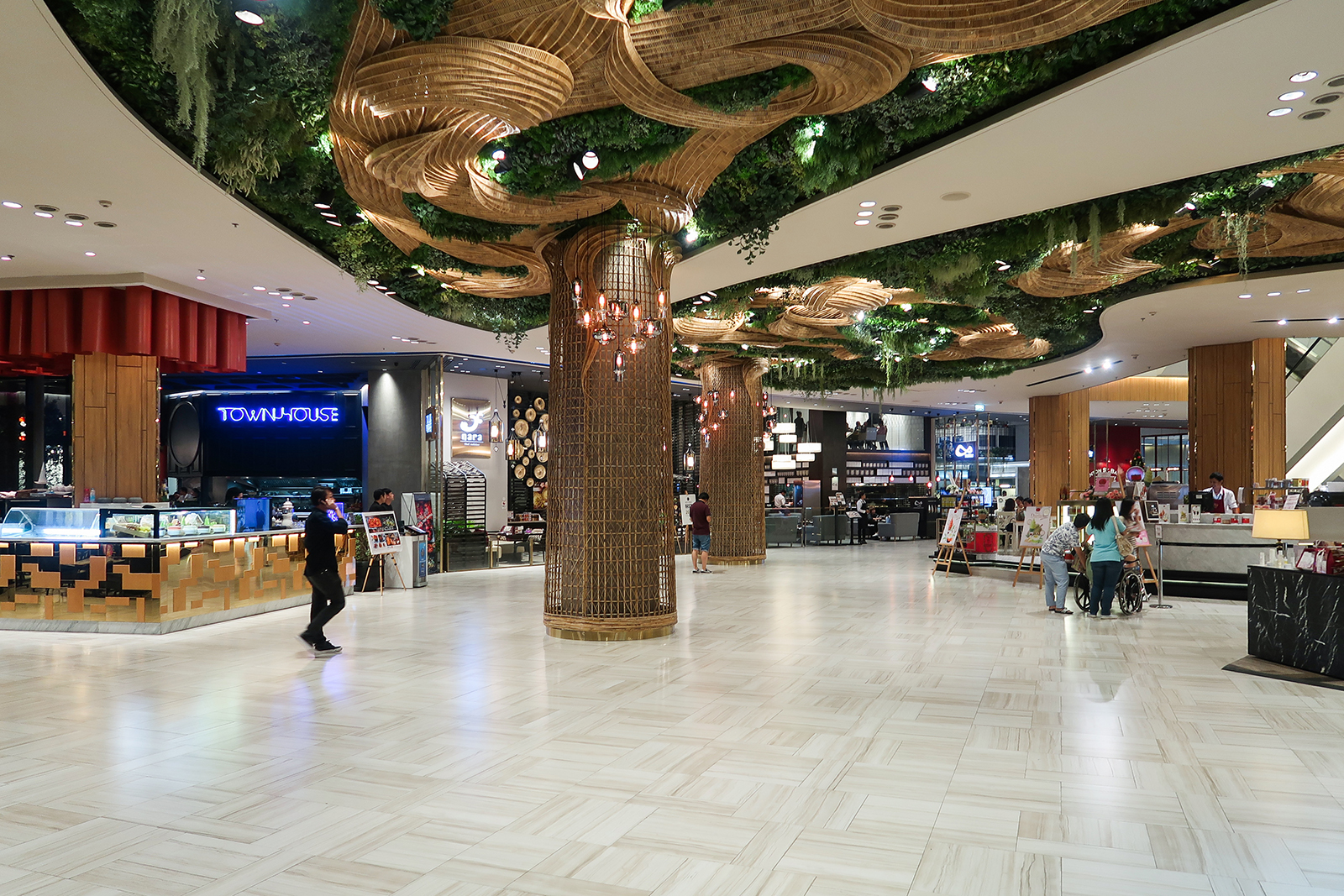
Gourmet Garden ceiling designed by Korakot Aromdee

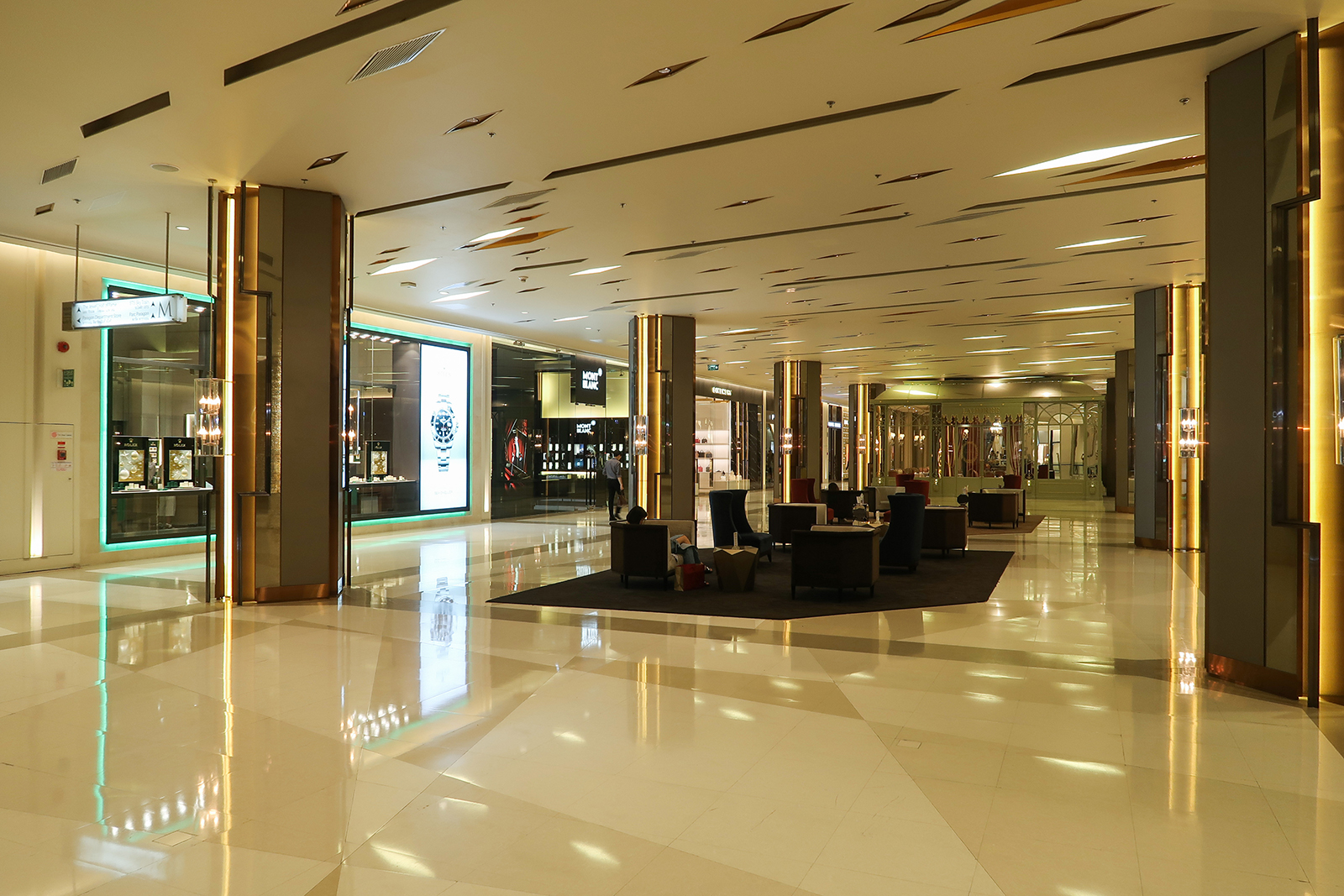
Level M

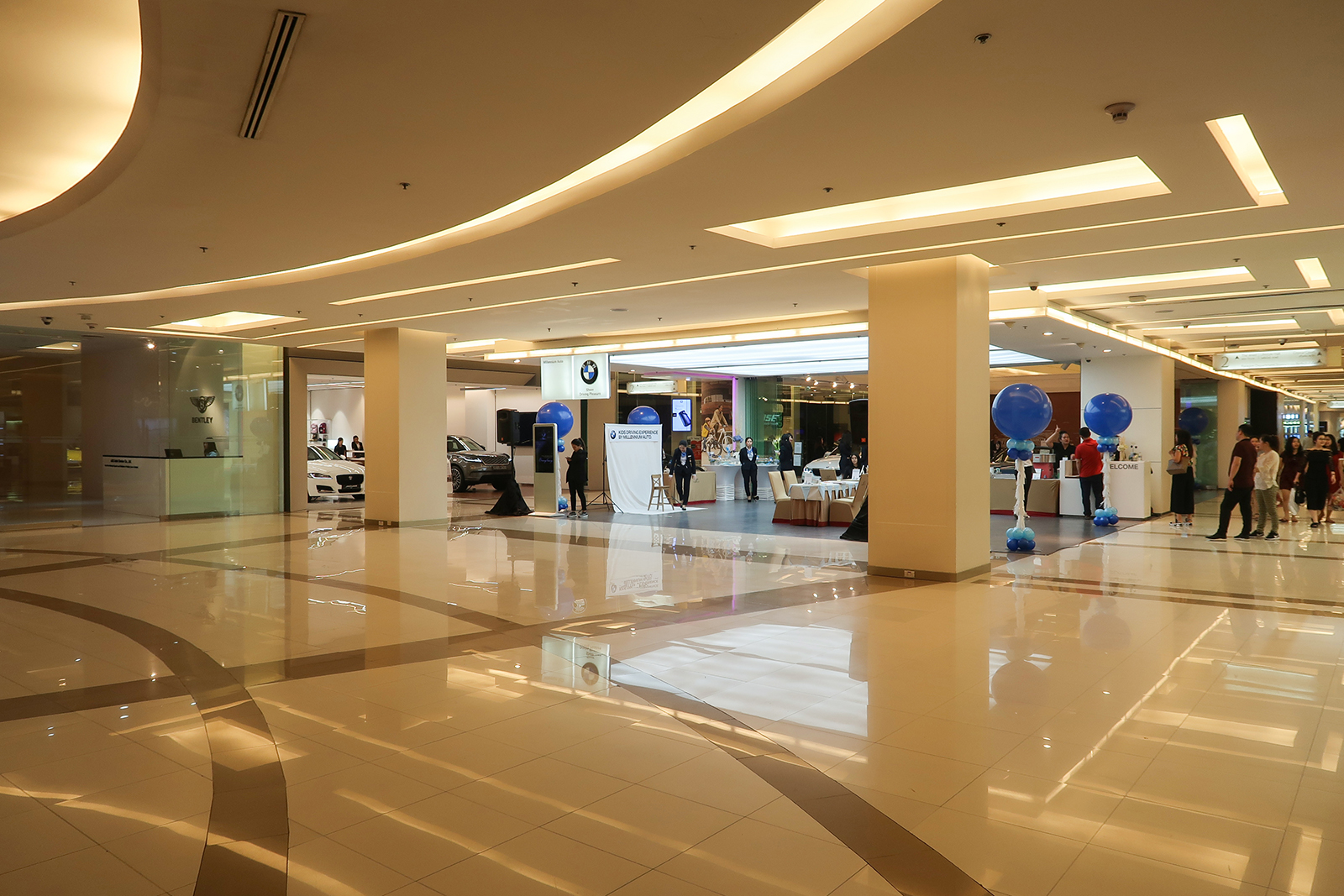
Level 2

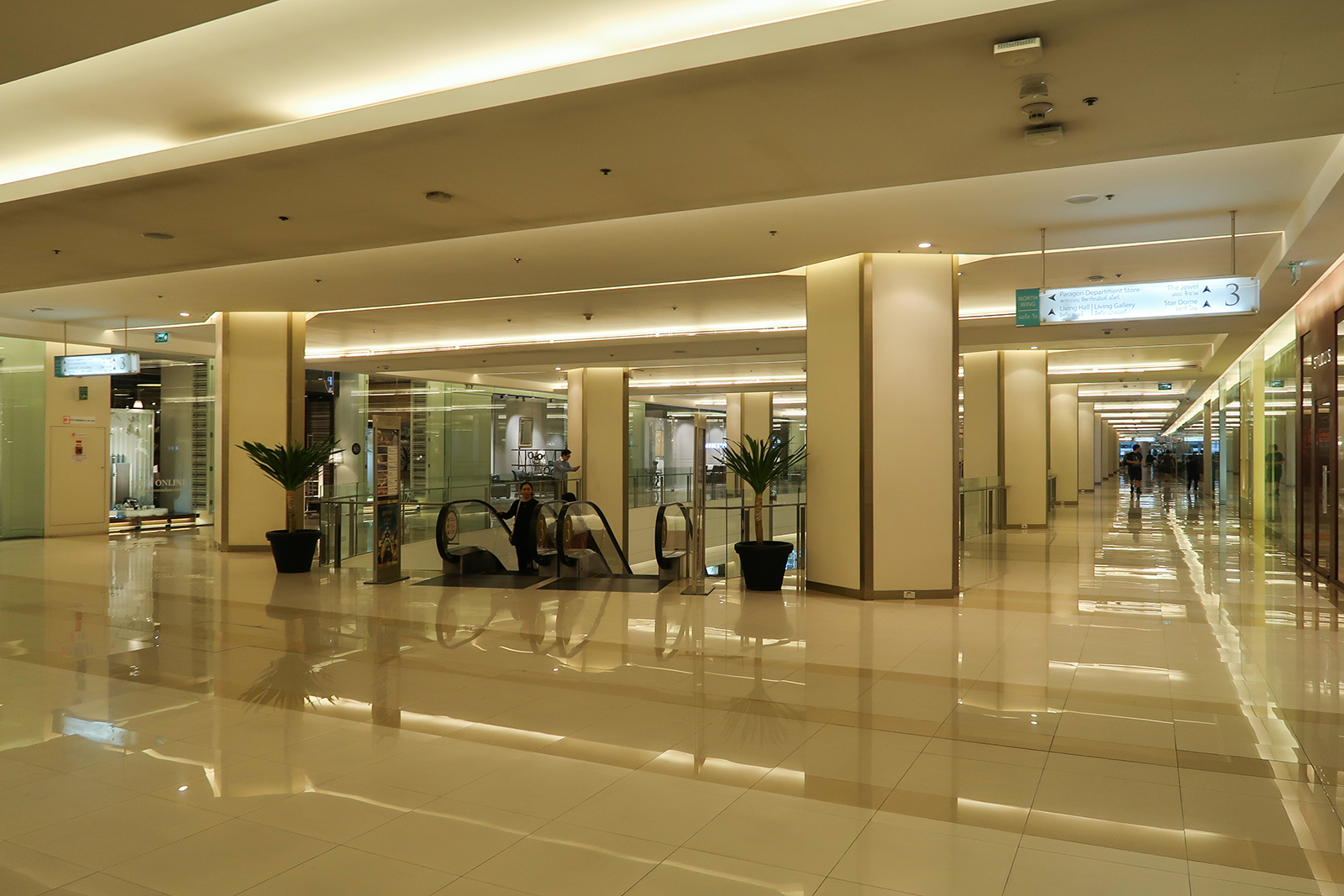
Level 3

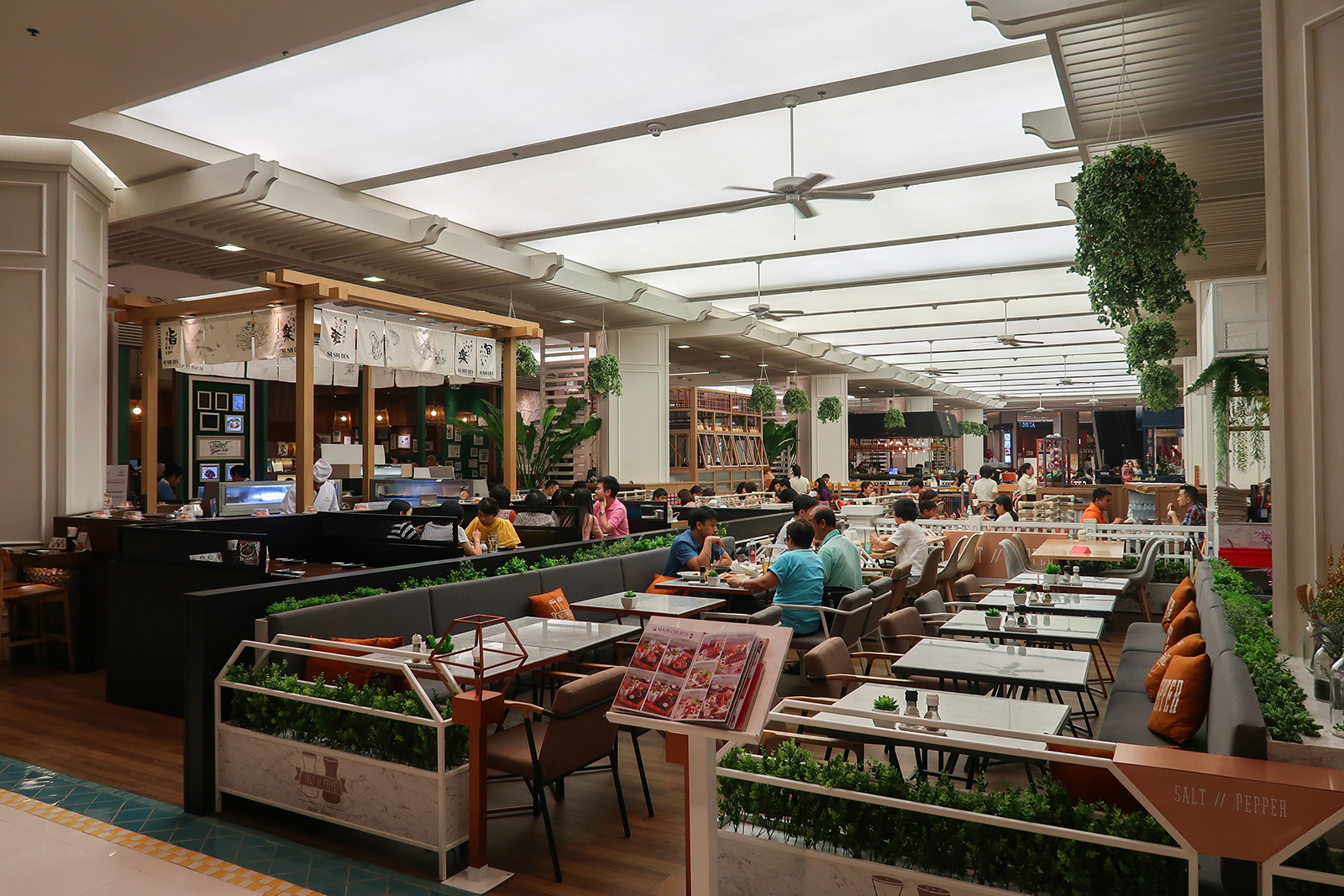
Food Passage in Level 4

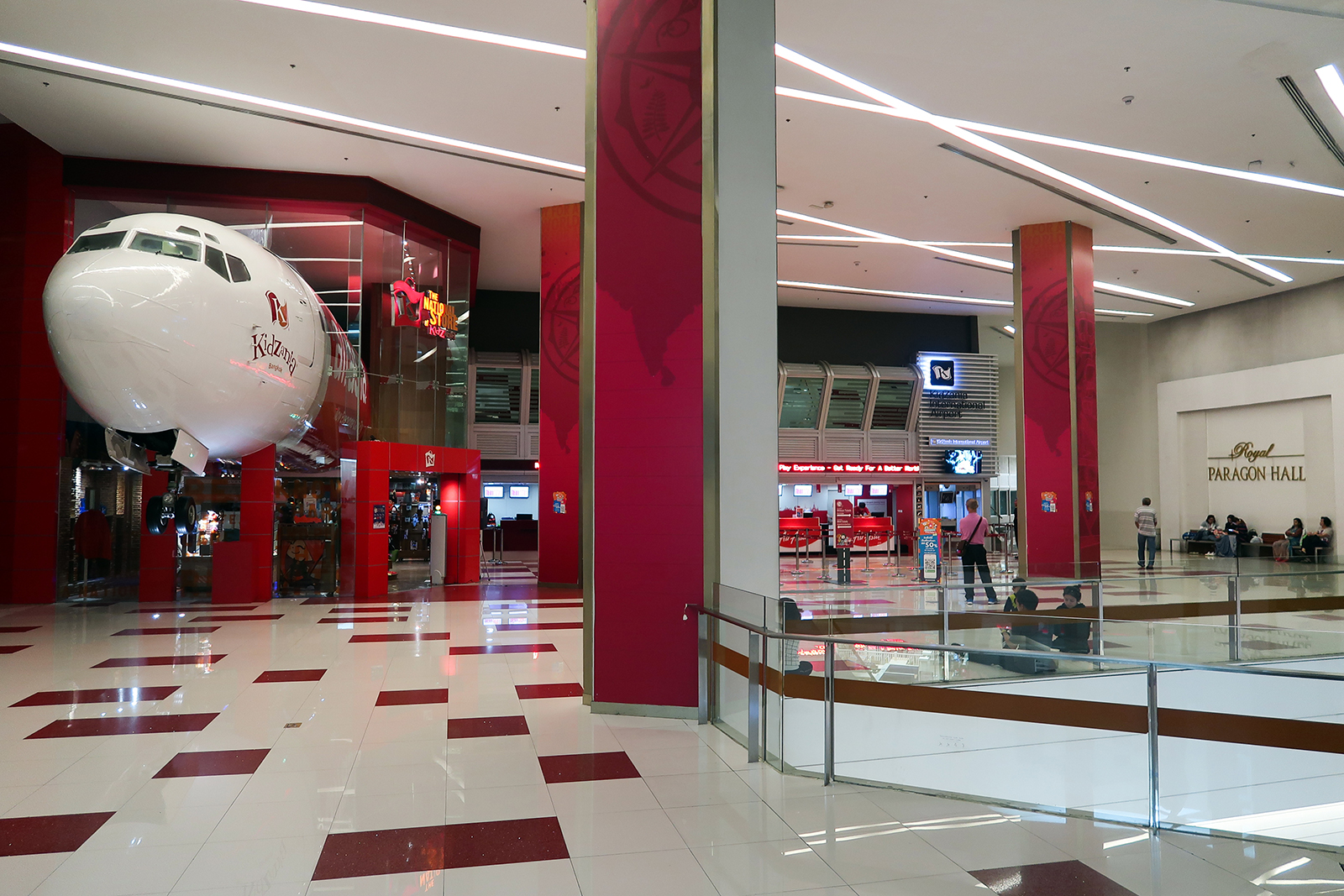
Kidzania in Level 5

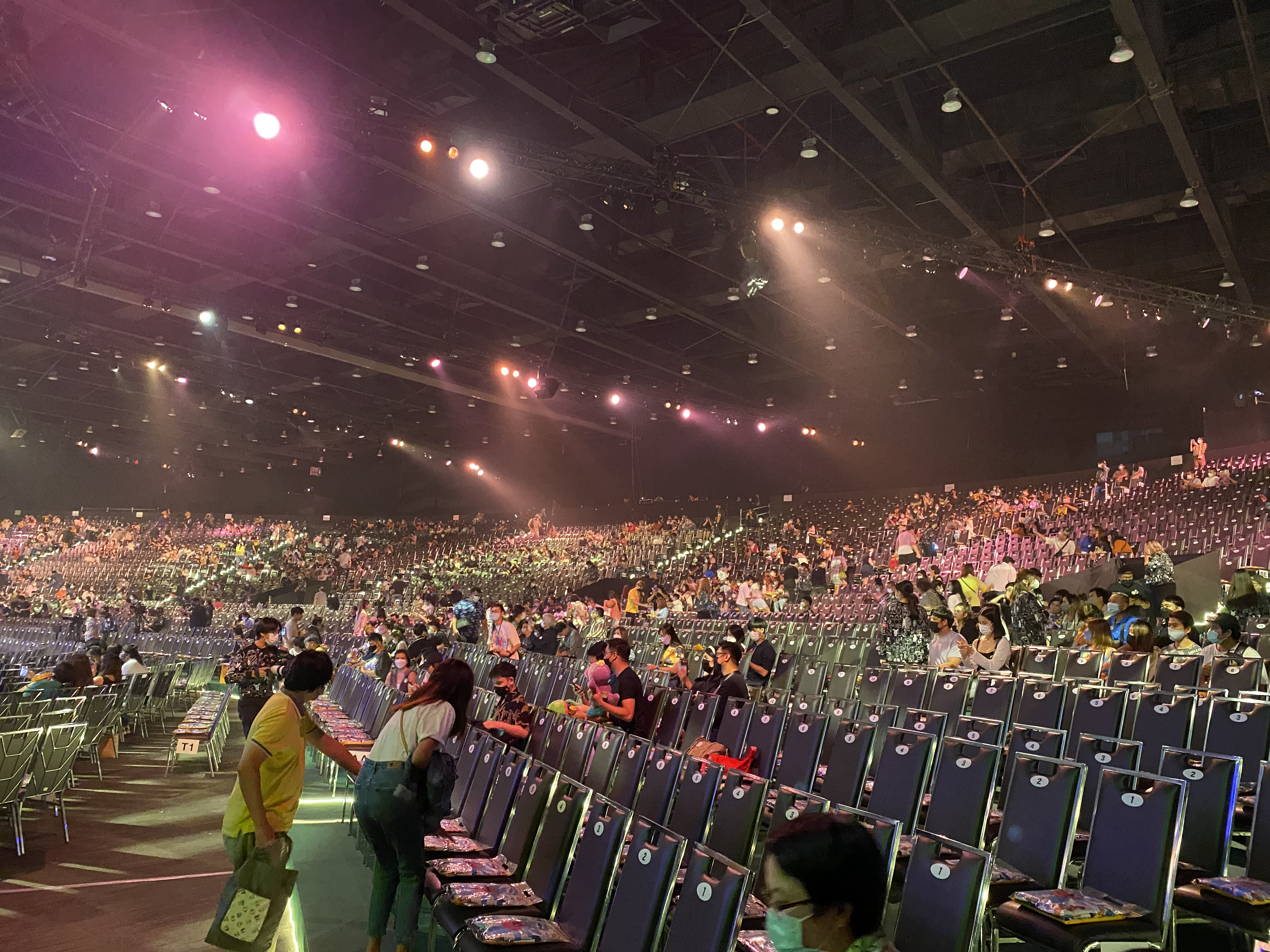
Paragon Hall in Level 5

== See also ==
- List of shopping malls in Thailand
- List of largest shopping malls in Thailand
