= Firearms Act (Thailand) =

- Long title: Firearms, Ammunition, Explosives, Fireworks, and Imitation Firearms Act, BE 2490
- Territorial extent: Thailand
- Assented to by: King Bhumibol Adulyadej
- Status: In force

The Firearms, Ammunition, Explosives, Fireworks, and Imitation Firearms Act, B.E. 2490 (Thai: พระราชบัญญัติอาวุธปืน เครื่องกระสุนปืน วัตถุระเบิด ดอกไม้เพลิง และสิ่งเทียมอาวุธปืน พ.ศ. 2490), commonly referred to as the Firearms Act, is a 1947 Thai law establishing regulations on the usage of firearms and other weapons.

== Revisions ==
As of August 2026, the law has been amended 9 times.

=== 2000 ===
Fees for P.3 purchase permits and P.4 possession-and-use licenses were revised.

=== 2026 ===
Following a series of violent firearms crimes including the 2026 Nonthaburi shootings, as of August 2026, the government of Prime Minister Anutin Charnvirakul is exploring a new overhaul of the Act.

Deputy Prime Minister for Legal Affairs Pakorn Nilprapunt said a key element of the revision would include creating a real-time firearms racking system covering importation, sale, ownership, licensing, and transfer.

Thailand's Ministry of the Interior plans to submit draft amendments to the Act by mid-October 2026. The amendments will include requirements for gun ownership permits to be renewed every three years.
