= 2026 Nonthaburi shootings =

School shooting in Thailand

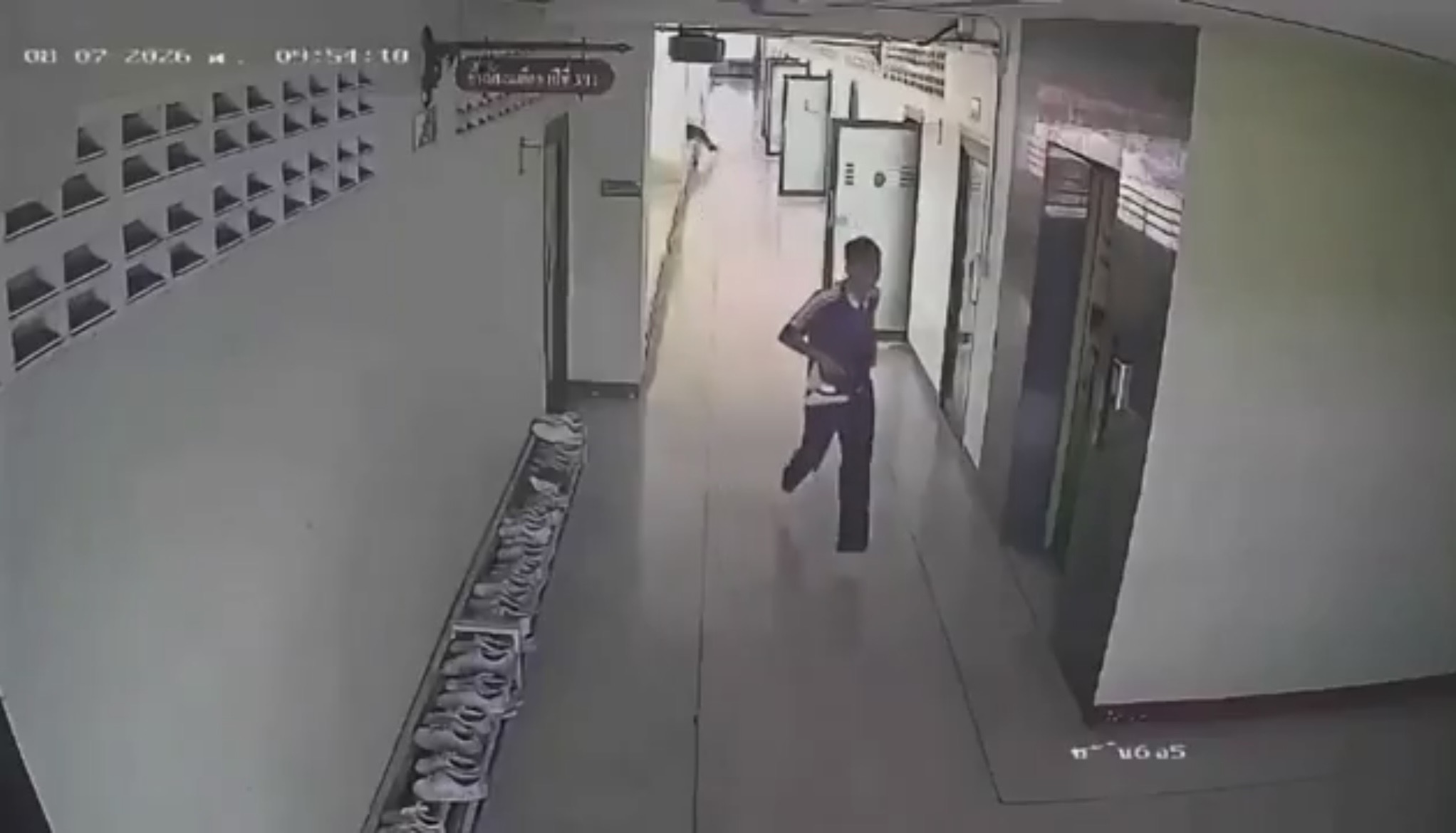
- Patchata fleeing down the stairs after opening fire on third-floor students and staff at Debsirin Nonthaburi School
- Location: Nonthaburi, Thailand; Soi Wat Lat Pla Duk, Bang Bua Thong district; Debsirin Nonthaburi School, Bang Kruai district (13°48′50″N 100°24′51″E)
- Date: 7 August 2026; 9:30 – 10:30 a.m. (ICT, UTC+7)
- Target: Perpetrator's grandparents at Soi Wat Lat Pla Duk; Students and staff at Debsirin Nonthaburi School
- Attack type: Mass shooting; school shooting; spree shooting; murder-suicide; familicide
- Weapons: 9mm CZ-75 Compact semi-automatic pistol; Knife (unused)
- Deaths: 9 (including the perpetrator)
- Injuries: 23+
- Perpetrator: Patchata Yimruang
- Motive: Under investigation; authorities note school bullying and academic pressure

On 7 August 2026, a school shooting occurred at Debsirin Nonthaburi School in Bang Kruai, Nonthaburi, Thailand. Patchata Yimruang, a 14-year-old student, killed six people and injured at least twenty-three others before killing himself. Patchata had also shot and killed his two grandparents in Bang Bua Thong prior to the shooting.

The shootings were the nation's deadliest mass killing since the 2022 Nong Bua Lamphu massacre, which killed thirty-eight people.

== Background ==
Debsirin Nonthaburi School, in Bang Kruai district, Nonthaburi, is a member of the Debsirin School Network, a coalition of schools headed by Debsirin School, a well-known boys' secondary school in Bangkok.

Thailand has a relatively high rate of gun ownership compared with other countries in Southeast Asia. Despite not fully legally registered to be carried by citizens, like United States of America.

Data from the Ministry of Public Health indicates that 65% of Thais aged between seven and 25 have experienced school bullying.

== Incidents ==
=== Soi Wat Lat Pla Duk shooting ===
According to an investigation, authorities found the dead bodies of the suspect's paternal grandparents at a residential estate at the Soi Wat Lat Pla Duk in Bang Bua Thong. They suspect that the perpetrator killed them prior to attacking the school. The perpetrator's neighbors and relatives who live nearby stated that they had not heard any gunshots prior. It was determined that around 5:00 a.m. ICT (UTC+7), the perpetrator fatally shot his grandfather in the kitchen before shooting his grandmother while she was sleeping. Both were killed by a single gunshot wound to the head. The perpetrator then boarded a school bus with a gun and a knife in his bag.

=== Debsirin Nonthaburi School shooting ===
The second shooting occurred at the Debsirin Nonthaburi School between approximately 9:30 and 9:50 a.m. The student was wearing a purple physical education uniform and a black cross-body bag when he opened fire inside the school. He initially entered classrooms 564 and 565 on the sixth floor of Building 5, where he killed two teachers.

He then descended to the fifth floor, changed his magazine, and attempted to shoot the students, but the gun briefly jammed. He then continued to the fourth floor, where he shot and killed the school's deputy director and secretary, before descending to the third floor, where he shot into the Thai language teacher's lounge and several classrooms. He then subsequently returned to the fifth floor and fired into classrooms again. He then barricaded himself inside the computer room on the third floor of the school building.

At around 10:00 a.m., officers from the Plai Bang Police Station and a special operations unit cordoned off the area. Teachers and school staff evacuated students by approximately 10:15 a.m., while medical teams transported the injured to hospitals. At around 10:30 a.m., the assailant shot himself in the head. He was still alive by the time first responders arrived, but he subsequently died. At least 26 shots were fired during the attack. Police declared the situation under control at 10:30 a.m.

== Victims ==
Eight victims were killed and at least 23 others were injured, nine of them critically. Seven of the victims died at the scenes of the shootings: five school staff members, including teachers and administrators, and the shooter's two grandparents who were found shot dead at their home. The eighth victim, a 12-year-old girl who was wounded during the school shooting, succumbed to her injuries in hospital the following day. As of 8 August, fourteen people remain hospitalized, seven of them in critical condition, while ten others were discharged.

On 8 August, King Vajiralongkorn provided funeral expenses for the deceased victims' families, as well as accepting the injured as patients under the royal care.

Names of the dead victims (excluding the shooter) were:

- Mr. Kittipong Somrat (School's vice director for student affairs)
- Miss Saifon Sirikitchakajorn (School secretary)
- Miss Tiwaporn Wanich (Guidance class teacher)
- Miss Nanchanatporn Nakplang (Thai language teacher)
- Miss Prapaporn Konsila (Math teacher)
- Miss Napat Chaima (Grade 7 student)
- Mr. Somjit Yimreung (Shooter's grandpa)
- Mrs. Pornthip Yimreung (Shooter's grandma)

== Perpetrator ==
The perpetrator was identified as 14-year-old Patchata Yimreung (Thai: พัชฏ ยิ้มเรือง), a Mathayom 3 (grade 9 student). According to authorities, he had been living with his grandparents. The perpetrator was described as a quiet student and was said to have been a victim of severe school bullying and extortions. The Straits Times reported that the day before the shooting, he had been locked in a bathroom by other students. He allegedly told teachers who was bullying him yet no actions were taken. Investigators found that Patchata had reportedly received a failing grade in his Thai language class from a teacher whom he then searched for in a separate building during the attack. They are examining whether this, combined with broader pressure from his grandparents and teachers over his school performance, contributed to the shooting, though police believe multiple factors combined and no single motive has been officially established.

Prior to the shooting, Patchata reportedly climbed onto a chair to retrieve a CZ-75 and two boxes of ammunition belonging to his grandfather from a cabinet on the second floor of his house. An inspection of his computer found five saved video clips of school shootings abroad, which he had viewed since 30 July, about a week before the incident. Investigators also found that Patchata had a growing interest in firearms, having researched guns online for around two years before the shooting, and had previously been caught bringing a BB gun to school, which a teacher confiscated the year prior. In the yard of the perpetrator's residence the police found a hanging Nazi flag which the police said to belong to his uncle. Nazi imagery is popular in Thailand and is typically not seen as offensive.

== Response ==
On 7 August, the Debsirin Nonthaburi School suspended on-site schooling from 10 to 14 August.

Prime Minister Anutin Charnvirakul sent Deputy Interior Minister Polapee Suwunchwee to the scene of the shooting to assess the situation. Nonthanburi governor Chettha Mosikarat also went to the site of the incident. Following the incident, Deputy Prime Minister Yodchanan Wongsawat announced that a mental health action plan would be introduced for students and teachers, while the Ministry of Education pledged to deploy stricter security measures at schools, especially the prevention of weapons and other dangerous items into school premises. The government also announced the suspension of issuances for new gun licenses.

UNICEF stated that the young age of the perpetrator reflected the need for better mental health services being provided to children, as well as urging the public to not share photos or footage of the incident.

== See also ==
- 2026 Hat Yai school shooting, another school shooting that occurred in Thailand in 2026
- 2023 Siam Paragon shooting, another mass shooting perpetrated by a 14-year-old in Thailand
