= 2022 Nong Bua Lamphu massacre =

Mass murder in Thailand

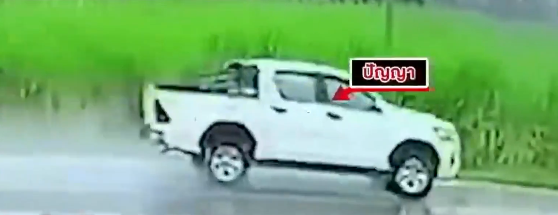
- CCTV still of Panya driving to the nursery
- Primary crime scenes: The nursery in Utthai Sawan (1), Ban Nong Kung Si (2) and Ban Tha Uthai (3)
- Location: 17°14′12″N 102°09′36″E; Na Klang district, Nong Bua Lamphu province, Thailand
- Date: 6 October 2022; 12:50 p.m. (UTC+7)
- Attack type: Mass murder, uxoricide, pedicide, familicide, mass stabbing, mass shooting, murder–suicide, vehicle-ramming attack, spree killing, school shooting, school stabbing, spree shooting
- Weapons: 9mm SIG Sauer P365 semi-automatic pistol; Shotgun; Knife; Toyota Hilux Revo pickup truck
- Deaths: 38 (including a fetus and the perpetrator)
- Injuries: 10
- Perpetrator: Panya Khamrab
- Motive: Inconclusive

On 6 October 2022, 34-year-old Panya Khamrab killed 37 people, 24 of whom were children, and injured 10 others by shooting, stabbing, and vehicle-ramming in Nong Bua Lamphu province, Thailand, before killing himself. The attack mainly occurred in a children's nursery located in the Uthai Sawan subdistrict of the Na Klang district. It is the deadliest mass murder by a single perpetrator in the modern history of Thailand, surpassing the death toll of the Nakhon Ratchasima shootings in 2020.

== Attack ==
On 6 October 2022, at around 11:24 ICT (UTC+7), the assailant, Panya Khamrab, drove a white Toyota Hilux Revo out of his residence. He arrived at the nursery at 12:50, where the attack began shortly after lunch. Armed with a 9mm SIG Sauer P365 semi-automatic pistol, a shotgun, and a knife, Khamrab fatally shot a father and son at the Uthai Sawan Sub-district Administrative Organization, near the nursery. He then entered the nursery building and attacked four or five staff members, three of whom died. Among them was a teacher who was eight months pregnant. Several staff members fled the scene. Witnesses nearby mistook the gunshots for fireworks.

Panya then entered a room where children were asleep and attacked them with the knife. There were 30 children in the nursery at the time of the attack. The bodies of nineteen boys and three girls were discovered in the nursery, while the bodies of a child and an adult were found at a nearby government building.

Panya fled the scene in the pickup truck. While passing through the Nong Kung Si district, he shot and killed seven people. He also rammed bystanders with the pickup truck, injuring two. At Tha Uthai Nuea village, he fatally ran over a villager. Panya arrived at his home, where he used petrol to set the pickup truck on fire.

Eleven people died – nine adults and two children – outside the nursery as Panya shot from his vehicle, according to police. Among them were Panya's wife and stepson, whom he shot before killing himself. Three adults died on the way to hospital.

The bodies of the dead were taken to a police station, where they were placed in coffins and moved to Udon Thani Hospital. Some family members were at the nursery in the evening, and mental health counsellors comforted them.

== Victims ==
A total of 37 people were killed, including 24 children, representing one of the worst death tolls of children in a mass murder committed by a single perpetrator in recent history. The ages of the victims ranged between 3 and 69 years. A further 10 were injured. The provincial police investigation unit commented that most of the fatalities were from the combined results of gunshot and knife wounds.

Some of the injured were taken to Na Klang Hospital, while eight others underwent surgery at Nong Bua Lamphu Hospital. Doctors at Nong Bua Lamphu Hospital said that there was an urgent need for blood, and a blood donation drive was held there.

== Perpetrator ==
The perpetrator was identified by police as 34-year-old Panya Khamrab (Thai: ปัญญา คำราบ; 4 June 1988 – 6 October 2022). Panya was a resident of Nong Bua Lamphu province and a former police sergeant in Na Wang district. His mother said that he graduated with a bachelor's degree in law at Ramkhamhaeng University. He also attended a police academy. His career in the police force began in 2012 and he had previously worked in Bangkok before being assigned to his birthplace of Nong Bua Lamphu. According to his mother, he may have taken to drugs after returning to Nong Bua Lamphu. During his police service at Nong Bua Lamphu, he displayed violent behaviour. He had his weapon seized when he fired at stray animals in the presence of colleagues.

Panya had been a drug addict since high school; in January 2022, he had been arrested for possessing methamphetamine. At the same time, he was treated for mental illness. He was dismissed from the police force in either 2021 or June 2022 as a result of his addiction. Earlier on the day of the attack, Panya attended a court hearing regarding his drug offences. He was scheduled to appear for another hearing the next day. He had applied for a job at the Uthai Sawan Tambon Administrative Organisation but was refused. The organisation is in the same compound as the nursery, which his son attended.

Although a motive has not been established, police understand that Panya was plagued by marital and financial troubles. He was separated from his wife. Colleagues recalled Panya experiencing mood swings and said that he was not well-liked. He had allegedly threatened a bank manager with a pistol after being found sleeping instead of carrying out guard duties at the bank. He also argued with his wife over a suspected affair, and with a neighbour after holding disruptive house parties. An argument had occurred between Khamrab and his wife on the morning of the attack. An interview with The Isaan Record also presented bullying of the perpetrator's stepson at the nursery and shunning of his girlfriend by the locals as possible causes.

Panya had legally purchased the 9mm SIG Sauer P365 semi-automatic pistol used in the attack. Initial investigations and autopsy did not find any drugs in his body in the 72 hours before the attack.

== Aftermath ==
Police lieutenant general Kitti Praphat arrived in Nong Bua Lamphu province to initiate a manhunt for Panya. Police advised people living in the area of the attack to be cautious as Khamrab's whereabouts were unknown. Thailand's prime minister, Prayut Chan-o-cha ordered relevant agencies to help the wounded and open an investigation into the event. The Hanuman Crime Suppression Division and Arintaraj 26 units were present at the scene after the attack.

Prayut visited Nong Bua Lamphu on 7 October to visit survivors and victims' families. Daycare centres in the area were closed, while all government institutions were instructed to fly their flags at half-mast. The Ministry of Interior said it would review and reinforce drug and gun ownership laws. On 10 October, Prayut ordered law enforcement agencies to tighten controls on gun ownership and crack down on drug use.

== Reactions ==
Prayut expressed his condolences and described the incident as "shocking". He said, "I feel deep sadness toward the victims and their relatives." UNICEF condemned the attack, adding, "Early childhood development centres, schools and all learning spaces must be safe havens for young children to learn, play and grow during their most critical years." The organisation also urged the media and the public to avoid sharing images of the incident. The Bangkok governor and foreign ministry, as well as British prime minister Liz Truss and Australian prime minister Anthony Albanese, expressed their condolences. The U.S. State Department issued a press statement condemning the attack and said the United States is ready to provide assistance.

King Vajiralongkorn has taken the victims under royal patronage, meaning the king would cover the funeral expenses of those killed and the medical expenses of those wounded. He also visited the hospital where the injured received treatment and met with the victims' families.

== See also ==
- Oklahoma City bombing - the deadliest attack on a daycare centre prior to the massacre.
- 2014 Isla Vista attacks
- 2020 Nova Scotia attacks
- Crime in Thailand
- Firearms in Thailand
- List of massacres in Thailand
- List of rampage killers (school massacres)
