= Nakhon Ratchasima shootings =

2020 mass shooting in Thailand

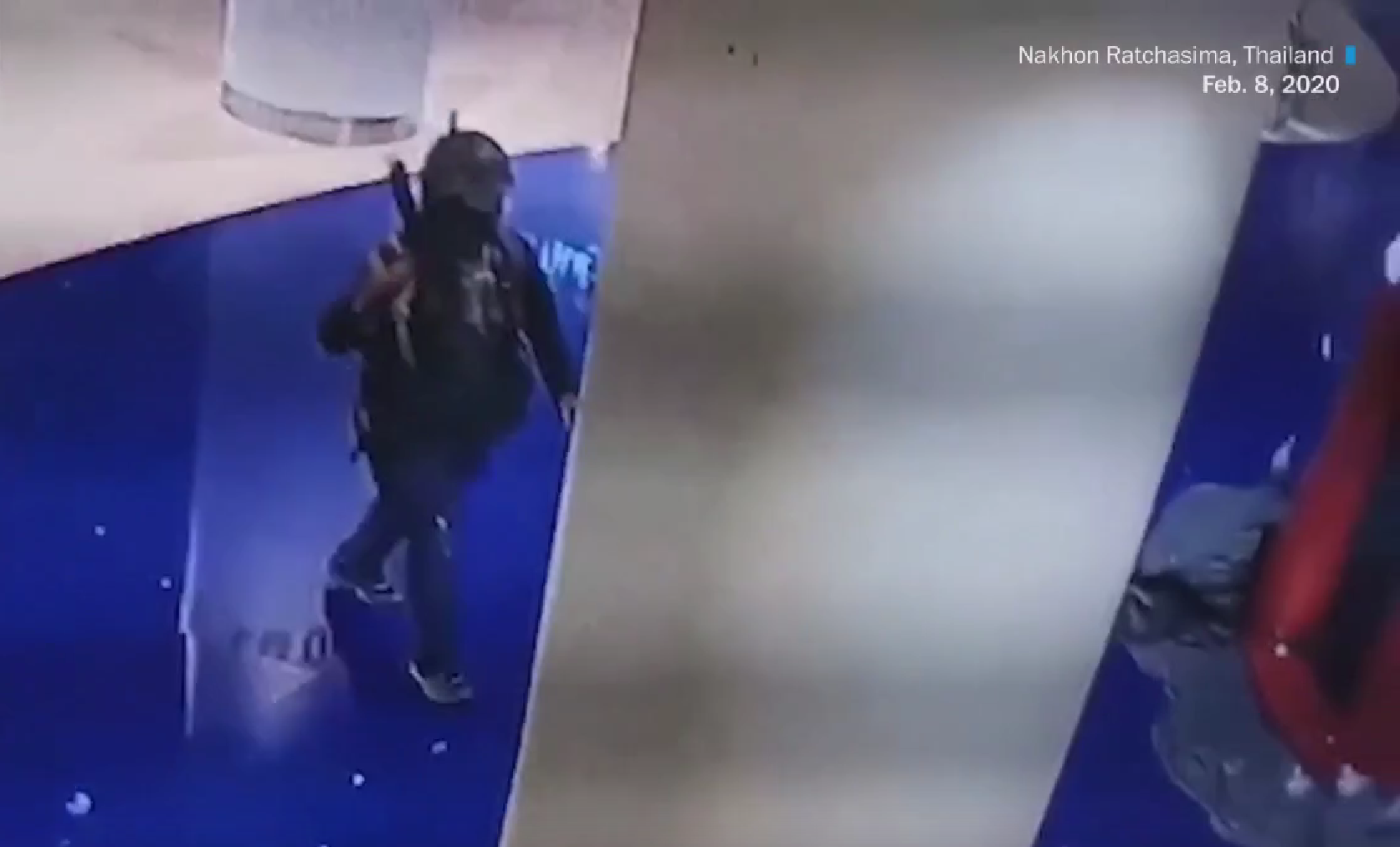
- Jakrapanth captured by CCTV cameras.
- Locations of Suratham Phithak Military Camp (1), Wat Pa Sattha Ruam (2) and Terminal 21 Korat (3), in Nakhon Ratchasima province
- Location: Nakhon Ratchasima, Nakhon Ratchasima province, Thailand
- Date: 8–9 February 2020; 15:30 – 09:13 (ICT; UTC+7)
- Target: Perpetrator's commander, and his mother-in-law, shoppers at Terminal 21 Korat
- Attack type: Hostage-taking, mass shooting, mass murder, spree shooting, shootout, workplace violence, Drive-by shooting, Arson
- Weapons: Two Type 11 assault rifles; M60 machine gun; 12-gauge Hatsan Escort Aimguard pump-action shotgun; .44 Magnum Smith & Wesson Performance Center Model 629 Competitor revolver; .22 LR Armscor M1400 Bolt-action rifle (unused)
- Deaths: 31 (including the perpetrator)
- Injuries: 58
- Perpetrator: Jakrapanth Thomma
- Motive: Business conflict between perpetrator and his commander

Between 8 and 9 February 2020, a mass shooting occurred near and in Nakhon Ratchasima, Thailand, colloquially known as Korat. A sergeant major of the Royal Thai Army killed 30 people and wounded 58 others before he was eventually shot and killed.

The attack began when the perpetrator shot and killed his commanding officer and two others at Suratham Phithak Military Camp (ค่ายสุรธรรมพิทักษ์), the base where he was stationed. The perpetrator then stole military weapons and a Humvee and drove to the Terminal 21 Korat shopping mall, which had a large number of shoppers due to the public holiday Magha Puja, where he opened fire on shoppers. On the way, he also fired at several people on the road and at Wat Pa Sattha Ruam, a Buddhist temple. During the attack, the perpetrator posted updates and shared a live stream on his Facebook account. Most of the victims were shot in the city's Terminal 21 shopping center, the same area where the shootout had occurred.

It was the deadliest mass shooting in Thailand's history, before being surpassed by the 2022 Nong Bua Lamphu massacre.

== Shootings ==
=== House and Suratham Phithak Military Camp ===
The shooting began at about 15:30 local time on 8 February 2020 at a house, where the gunman arrived to discuss a property dispute with his commander, Colonel Anantharot Krasae, and his commander’s mother-in-law, Anong Mitrchan. The gunman shot both of them dead and seriously wounded a property agent, who was also present.

Afterwards, the gunman went to the Suratham Phithak army base where he worked and raided the camp, stealing from a guard post and the camp armories two Type 11 assault rifles (a variant of the HK33), an M60 machine gun, and 776 rounds of ammunition. He killed a soldier in the process with a 12-gauge Hatsan Escort Aimguard pump-action shotgun, which was caught on CCTV. He then stole a Humvee and wounded the driver. The gunman escaped the base and opened fire on two police officers and two civilians, wounding them. The officers sustained multiple gunshot wounds in their legs and backs.

=== Wat Pa Sattha Ruam Buddhist temple and Terminal 21 Korat shopping mall ===
After escaping, the gunman parked at the back gate of Wat Pa Sattha Ruam, a Buddhist temple. He started firing at approaching motorists, killing a woman in her sedan and injuring her son. He then gunned down a 13-year-old boy passing by on a motorbike and murdered two policemen as they drove up to the back gate. The gunman also shot five people in an SUV at point-blank range; only one of the occupants survived. The gunman escaped through the main gate, having killed at least nine people around the temple grounds.

He then arrived at the Terminal 21 Korat shopping mall in the city of Nakhon Ratchasima. At that point he left the vehicle and began shooting indiscriminately at people outside the mall, killing or injuring several motorists and motorcyclists. The gunman later headed towards the mall's parking lot and fired at a gas cylinder, lighting it ablaze. He also killed an auto repair shop employee and a motorist in the parking lot. He subsequently sheltered in the mall's multi-level complex, where it was reported that he was taking hostages. The gunman live streamed on Facebook Live during the siege and shared photos and memes on his profile page, although his account was eventually taken down by Facebook.

Police officers and soldiers stormed the mall, establishing a 2 km (1.2 mi) cordon around the building and gradually evacuating hundreds of trapped shoppers. The gunman remained inside for several hours, during which his mother was brought by authorities to try to convince him to surrender. Police announced that they had secured Terminal 21 Korat's ground floor by 22:50 local time, but the gunman retreated to the mall's basement level by the next day. At approximately 3:30 local time on 9 February, he engaged in a fierce shootout with members of the Arintaraj 26 police tactical unit. The gunfight resulted in Captain Trakoon Ta-arsa being shot in the chest and killed, becoming the first Arintaraj 26 officer to be killed in action since the unit's founding in 1983. Another officer of Arintaraj 26 was shot through the head and critically injured, while a policeman was also wounded in the shootout after being struck in the leg.

As law enforcement further closed in on the gunman, he tried to break into a cold storage room of the mall's Foodland supermarket. Several people were hiding in the room, including 18-year-old student Athiwat Promsuk. He held the storage room's door shut to allow the others to escape, but the gunman was eventually able to barge in and gun him down. Athiwat's actions were credited by a fellow classmate with saving the lives of eight people. The gunman shot at anybody he encountered in the cold storage room, resulting in a total of six fatalities being reported within that location; among them were a 2-year-old child and both of his parents. Inside the supermarket, he kept exchanging fire with special forces and fatally shot Sen. Sergeant Major Petcharat Kamchadphai, who was marked as the second Arintaraj 26 officer ever killed in action. On 9 February, at 09:13 local time, police announced that they had shot and killed the gunman near the Foodland supermarket.

== Perpetrator ==
Sergeant Major 1st Class Jakrapanth Thomma (จักรพันธ์ ถมมา, RTGS: Chakkraphan Thomma; 4 April 1988 – 9 February 2020), age 31, was identified as the gunman. His hometown was Kaeng Khro in Chaiyaphum province. He was stationed at the Suratham Phithak Military Base, where the first shooting took place. Thomma previously received training as a non-commissioned officer and was an expert marksman.

Jakrapanth's acquaintances said he was upset over being allegedly cheated out of a property deal and not being given back his money by his commanding officer, Colonel Anantharot Krasae, and Krasae's mother-in-law, who were both shot dead. During the shooting, Thomma posted online, "Rich from cheating and taking advantage of people ... Do they think they can take money to spend in hell?"

== Aftermath ==
=== Social media use ===
The perpetrator posted on social media during his attack, asking on Facebook if he should surrender. He had previously posted a picture of a pistol and bullets, captioned "It is time to get excited," and "Nobody can avoid death." Facebook responded by removing the page and issuing a statement condemning the attack.

=== Criticism of media coverage ===
The events of the shooting were initially covered as live broadcasts near the scene by Thai broadcasters, which received public and governmental criticism for possibly providing the gunman with information about the movements of authorities intervening at the scene. Thailand's broadcast regulator, the NBTC, have called a meeting with representatives of television stations for discussion of their live broadcasts of the siege. NBTC secretary-general Takorn Tanthasit stated he ordered all TV stations to stop live broadcasting the situation and any other information that could have impeded the actions of authorities from intervening, and had issued warnings that were ignored by some stations, which he implied will lead to disciplinary action. The hashtags #แบนช่องone ("Ban Channel One"), #แบนไทยรัฐ ("Ban Thairath") and #สื่อไร้จรรยาบรรณ ("Media without ethics") trended on Twitter in Thailand in response to the media's live coverage.

=== Criticism of military and government ===
In the aftermath, the military co-run government was a target of anger, with the hashtags "Reform the Military" and "Prayuth RIP" trending on Twitter. In particular, it was criticized for being unable to prevent one of its own soldiers from easily stealing weapons and committing the shootings, contrasting with its strong control of politics and the economy. In January 2020, General Apirat Kongsompong lauded new laws intended to make it more difficult for ill-intentioned people to steal weapons from the military.

== See also ==
- Crime in Thailand
- List of massacres in Thailand
- Live streaming crime
- 2022 Nong Bua Lamphu massacre
- 2015 Bangkok bombing
