= 2026 Hat Yai school shooting =

School shooting in Thailand

- Location: Hat Yai, Songkhla, Thailand
- Date: 11 February 2026
- Attack type: School shooting, hostage taking
- Weapon: SIG MPX
- Deaths: 1
- Injuries: 3 (including one non-gunshot victim and the suspect)
- Accused: Khemanan Kescharoen

On 11 February 2026, an 18-year-old allegedly opened fire at the Patongprathankiriwat School in Hat Yai, Songkhla, Thailand. He supposedly fired several shots and temporarily held students and teachers hostage before being detained by police.

== Attack ==
According to police and local officials, the incident began in the afternoon when an 18-year-old man allegedly entered the premises of Patongprathankiriwat School and opened fire with a SIG MPX 9mm, which was stolen from police officers.

The shooter reportedly briefly took students and teachers hostage inside a classroom while police surrounded the school and began evacuation procedures.

== Victims ==
The victims were a child who suffered an ankle injury after they fell from a height while evacuating, a 14-year-old girl hospitalized with gunshot injuries who underwent surgery and the school director. The shooter was also transported to hospital for treatment. The school director succumbed to her injuries in the early morning of 12 February after being sent for surgery. Emergency response teams transported the injured to local hospitals, where some underwent surgery.

Mrs. Sasiphat Sinsamosorn, who is the school's director later died at 03:00 local time.

== Suspect ==
Thai authorities identified the suspect as an 18-year-old male whose motivations were still under investigation as of the initial reports.

== Aftermath ==
Authorities increased security at nearby schools and began an investigation into the attack, which drew international media attention due to the rarity of such incidents in Thailand.
