= Foodland (Thailand) =

Thai supermarket chain

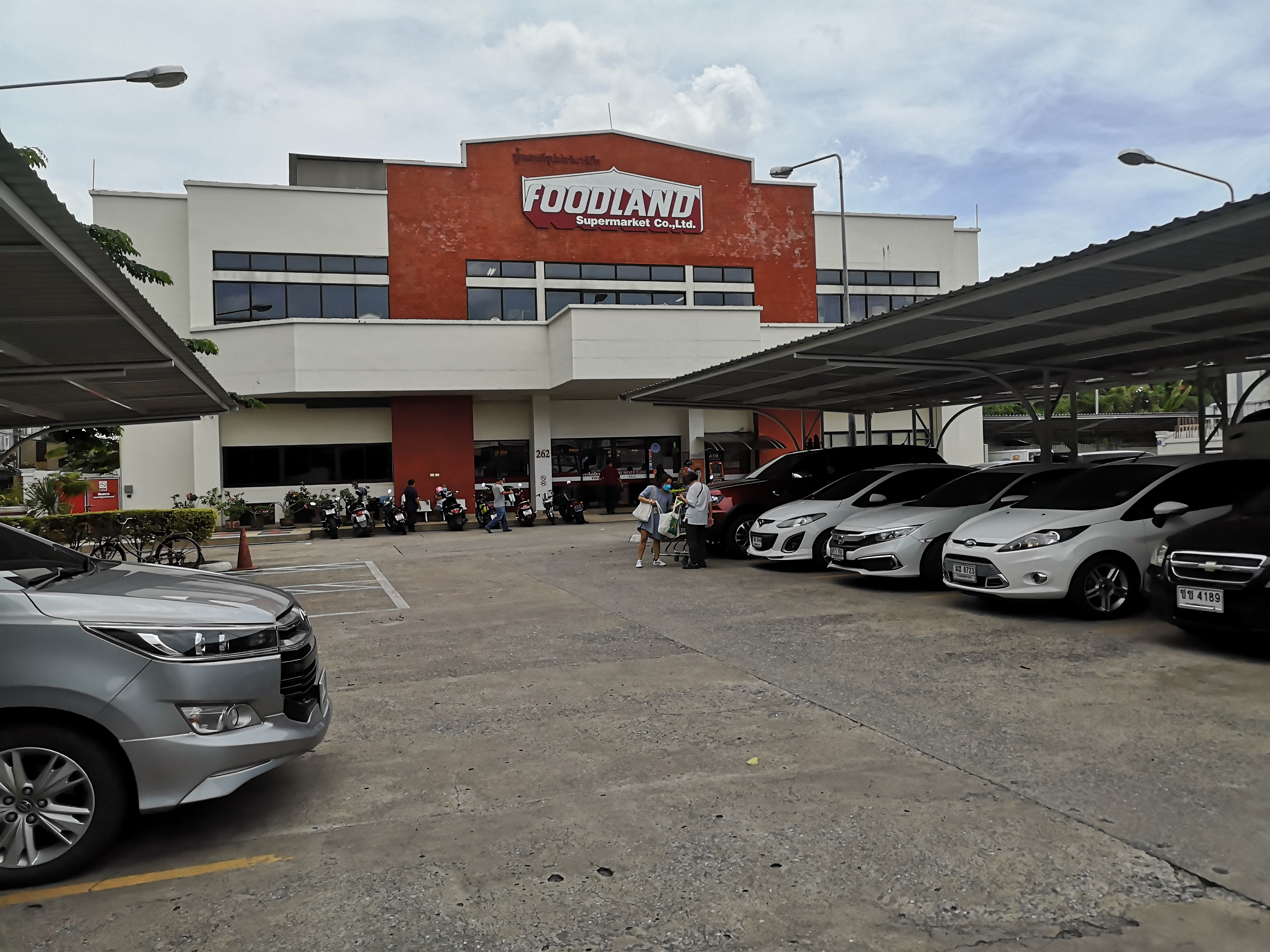
Charan Sanit Wong branch.

Foodland (Thai: ฟู้ดแลนด์) is a chain of supermarkets operating in Thailand. It is operated by Foodland Supermarket Co. Ltd., and was established in 1972 by Somsak Teraphatanakul. The chain, which positions itself as an upmarket brand, operates twenty-two branches throughout the country.

== History ==
In the year 1972, the grocery store business is very new in Thailand the only groceries store that was available at that time is “Daily Lane”. Thus, Mr. Somsak Teraphatakul and his partners decided to first open the grocery store named “Pleonchit Supermarket” it is the first 24 hours opening of a supermarket in Asia. After 6 months, Mr. Somsak and his partner have made a decision to open the second branches of the supermarket named “Patpong Supermarket” which is located on Patpong road.

Unfortunately, Mr. Somsak does not specialise in the field of retail business service in the form of supermarket chains. So he decided to employ a specialist in retail business from Hongkong as a managing director of company services to assist his business to succeed and develop. For the third branch, he decided to buy the supermarket chain “Daily lane” and changed to name to “Foodland” as well as the 1st and 2nd branches.

== Business Crisis During The Pandemic ==
=== Economic Stimulus ===
Foodland uses marketing techniques like the "buy one, get one free" campaign. This will be conducted typically once every month to increase sales. Which the feedback was very interested.

=== Peg the price ===
Since the pandemic started, the political problems in Thailand and various countries have led to a skyrocketing increase in cost. Foodland has dealt with many suppliers to peg the price and to help the customers. As well as the butcher that Foodland produces themselves, the large amount of pork is used and whether the cost of the pork is increasing by 30%, Foodland still trying to fix the price.

=== Took Lae dee the first time losing business ===
Took Lae dee restaurant has suffered its first loss since opening the shop more than 12 million baht. Due to the lockdown and the seat restrictions and also the increasing cost of the materials Foodland is trying to fix the price to help the customers.
