= The Isaan Record =

Thai online news outlet

- Editor-in-chief: Hathairat Pahonthap
- Editor: Kowit Phothisan
- Founded: 2011
- Language: Thai, English
- City: Khon Kaen, Thailand
- Website: theisaanrecord.co

The Isaan Record (Thai: เดอะอีสานเรคคอร์ด) (established in 2011) is an online Thai and English language media outlet based in Khon Kaen, Thailand, focused on environmental, social, and political news in Isaan (Northeastern) Thailand.

== History ==
=== 2021 writer visa revocation ===
On 18 February 2021, David Streckfuss, an American scholar and international coordinator of The Isaan Record, had his contract as a professor at Khon Kaen University (KKU), resulting in his visa being revoked on 18 March 2021. Streckfuss has previously written on land's lese-majeste law. In May 2021, Streckfuss was subsequently issued a new work visa.

=== 2026 lawsuit ===
In 2025, Natural Resources and Environment minister Suchart Chomklin filed two defamation lawsuits against The Isaan Record editor and editor-in-chief, following the outlet's coverage of a labour trafficking scandal and allegations of bribery of Suchart. Suchart's lawsuits were characterized by the National Human Rights Commission of Thailand as strategic lawsuits against public participation (SLAPP).

== Awards and recognition ==
In September 2025, The Isaan Record released "Blood Berries | หมากไม้", a documentary focused on the experiences of Thai migrant workers in Finland picking wild berries. In 2026, the documentary won a Best Human Rights Film award at the Montreal Women Film Festival in Canada.
