= Seven discography =

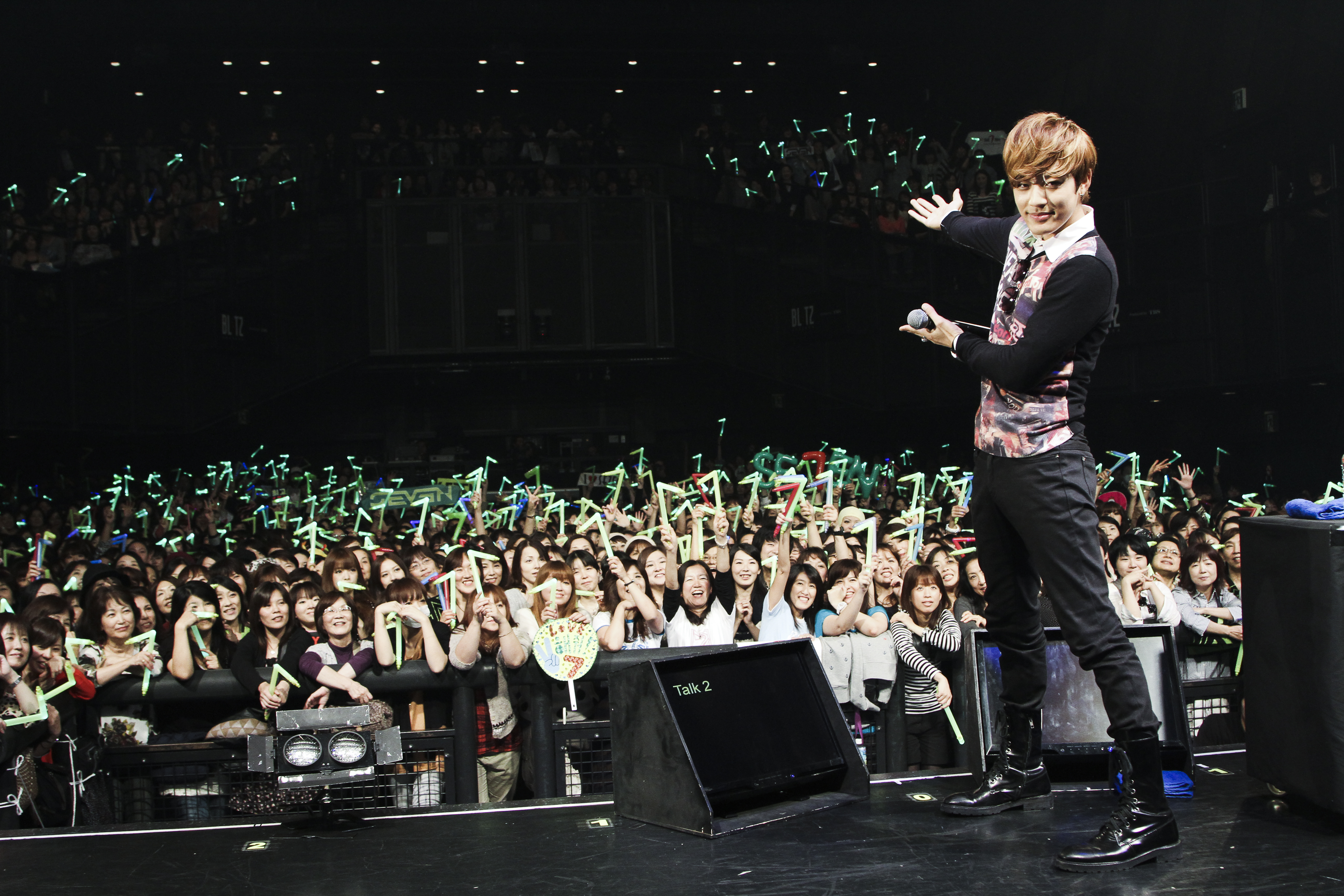
- Seven in 2011
- Studio albums: 8
- Extended plays: 5
- Compilation albums: 1
- Singles: 32
- Music videos: 32

This is the discography of South Korean singer Seven.

== Albums ==
=== Studio albums ===
Title	Album details	Peak chart positions		Sales
Title	Album details	KOR RIAK (Note: Week references for Recording Industry Association of Korea Albums Chart: Just Listen, Must Listen, 24/Seven, Sevolution.)	JPN	Sales
Korean
Just Listen	Released: March 7, 2003; Label: YG Entertainment; Format: CD, digital download	4	—	KOR: 225,258; THA: 70,000
Must Listen	Released: July 13, 2004; Label: YG Entertainment; Format: CD, digital download	1	—	KOR: 173,783; THA: 100,000
24/Seven	Released: March 8, 2006; Label: YG Entertainment; Format: CD, digital download	1	—	KOR: 108,066
Sevolution	Released: November 1, 2006; Label: YG Entertainment; Format: CD, digital download	4	—	KOR: 55,400
Chinese
Must Listen	Released: January 13, 2006; Label: YG Entertainment; Format: CD, digital download	—	—	
Japanese
First Seven	Released: March 8, 2006; Label: Nexstar Records; Format: CD, digital download	—	15	JPN: 18,710
Dangerman	Released: December 7, 2016; Label: Victor Entertainment; Format: CD, digital download	—	24	JPN: 3,732
1109	Released: November 9, 2017; Label: Victor Entertainment; Format: CD, digital download	—	30	JPN: 2,007

=== Compilation albums ===
Title	Album details	Peak chart positions	Sales
Title	Album details	JPN	Sales
Japanese
Seven the Best	Released: September 5, 2012; Label: YGEX; Format: CD, digital download	19	JPN: 5,402

== Extended plays ==
Title	Album details	Peak chart positions		Sales
Title	Album details	KOR Gaon (Note: Week references for Gaon Album Chart: Digital Bounce, Seven New Mini Album, I Am Seven.)	JPN (Note: Week references for Oricon Albums Chart: I Am Seven.)	Sales
Korean
Digital Bounce	Released: July 21, 2010; Label: YG Entertainment; Format: CD, digital download	2	—	KOR: 24,604
Seven New Mini Album	Released: February 1, 2012; Label: YG Entertainment; Format: CD, digital download	5	—	KOR: 16,274
I Am Seven	Released: October 14, 2016; Label: Eleven9 Entertainment; Format: CD, digital download	8	233	KOR: 4,285; JPN: 495
Japanese
Somebody Else	Released: January 18, 2012; Label: YGEX; Format: CD, digital download	—	13	JPN: 13,723
Ride	Released: November 9, 2022; Label: Ariola Japan; Format: CD, digital download	—	24	JPN: 1,698

== Singles ==
Title	Year	Peak chart positions			Sales	Album
Title	Year	KOR (Note: Week references for Gaon Digital Chart: "Better Together", "Digital Bounce", "I'm Going Crazy", "Make Good Love", "Angel", "Somebody Else", "When I Can't Sing",)	JPN	JPN Hot. (Note: Week references for Billboard Japan Hot 100: "Rainbow".)	Sales	Album
Korean
"Come Back to Me" (와줘)	2003	(Note: Gaon Music Chart began releasing data in 2010 after the Recording Industry Association of Korea stopped compiling data in October 2008.)	—	—		Just Listen
"Once, Just Once" (한번 단 한번)	2003	(Note: Gaon Music Chart began releasing data in 2010 after the Recording Industry Association of Korea stopped compiling data in October 2008.)	—	—		Just Listen
"I Just Wanna Be"	2003	(Note: Gaon Music Chart began releasing data in 2010 after the Recording Industry Association of Korea stopped compiling data in October 2008.)	—	—		Just Listen
"Baby I Like You Like That"	2003	(Note: Gaon Music Chart began releasing data in 2010 after the Recording Industry Association of Korea stopped compiling data in October 2008.)	—	—		Just Listen
"Passion" (열정; 熱情)	2004	(Note: Gaon Music Chart began releasing data in 2010 after the Recording Industry Association of Korea stopped compiling data in October 2008.)	—	—		Must Listen
"Tattoo" (문신; 文身)	2004	(Note: Gaon Music Chart began releasing data in 2010 after the Recording Industry Association of Korea stopped compiling data in October 2008.)	—	—		Must Listen
"Crazy"	2004	(Note: Gaon Music Chart began releasing data in 2010 after the Recording Industry Association of Korea stopped compiling data in October 2008.)	—	—		Non-album single
"I Know" (난 알아요)	2006	(Note: Gaon Music Chart began releasing data in 2010 after the Recording Industry Association of Korea stopped compiling data in October 2008.)	—	—		24/Seven
"Come Back To Me Part 2" (와줘 Part 2)	2006	(Note: Gaon Music Chart began releasing data in 2010 after the Recording Industry Association of Korea stopped compiling data in October 2008.)	—	—		24/Seven
"La La La" (라라라)	2006	(Note: Gaon Music Chart began releasing data in 2010 after the Recording Industry Association of Korea stopped compiling data in October 2008.)	—	—		Se7olution
"Be Good to You" (잘할게)	2006	(Note: Gaon Music Chart began releasing data in 2010 after the Recording Industry Association of Korea stopped compiling data in October 2008.)	—	—		Se7olution
"La La La (Remix)" (라라라 (Remix))	2007	(Note: Gaon Music Chart began releasing data in 2010 after the Recording Industry Association of Korea stopped compiling data in October 2008.)	—	—		Seven 747
"Better Together"	2010	5	—	—	KOR: 1,629,015	Digital Bounce
"I'm Going Crazy"	2010	33	—	—		Digital Bounce
"When I Can't Sing" (내가 노래를 못해도)	2012	1	—	—	KOR: 2,394,257	Se7en New Mini Album
"Somebody Else"	2012	36	—	—		Se7en New Mini Album
"Thank U" (고마워)	2013	—	—	—		Non-album single
"I'm Good" (괜찮아)	2016	—	—	—		I Am Seven
"Give It to Me"	2016	—	—	—		I Am Seven
"Scared"	2018	—	—	—		Non-album single
"Cold"	2019	—	—	—		Non-album single
Japanese
"Hikari" (光; Light)	2005	—	28	—	KOR: 21,570	First Seven
"Style"	2005	—	10	—		First Seven
"Start Line"	2005	—	4	—		First Seven
"Forever"	2005	—	4	—		First Seven
"I Wanna..."	2006	—	10	—		Seven the Best
"Aitai" (会いたい; I Want to See You)	2007	—	17	—		Seven the Best
"Ari no Mama" (ありのまま; As It Is)	2007	—	11	—		Seven the Best
"Kimi Dake ni" (君だけに; Only You)	2008	—	—	—		Seven the Best
"Love Again"	2012	—	10	—		Seven the Best
"Arigatō" (ありがとう; Thank You)	2013	—	10	—		Non-album single
"Rainbow"	2016	—	8	46	JPN: 15,075	Dangerman
"Dangerman"	2016	—	—	—		Dangerman
English
"Girls" (featuring Lil' Kim)	2009	—	—	—		Non-album single

== Other charted songs ==
Title	Year	Peak chart positions	Sales	Album
Title	Year	KOR	Sales	Album
"Digital Bounce" (featuring T.O.P)	2010	22		Digital Bounce
"Make Good Love"	2012	73		Se7en New Mini Album
"Angel"	2012	61		Se7en New Mini Album

== Guest appearances ==
Title	Year	Other performer(s)	Album
"She's Mine"	2004	Wheesung	Non-album track
"Collision" (충돌; Chungdol)	2004	Taebin	Taebin of 1TYM
"Real Love Story"	2004	Taebin, Wheesung	Taebin of 1TYM
"Song of Athletics" (田径之歌)	2006	Liu Xiang	And Want You Know
"Take Control" (East Asia bonus track)	2007	Amerie	Because I Love It

== Soundtrack appearances ==
Title	Year	Album
"Longing Is Useless" (그리움도 안되겠죠; Geuriumdo Andoegetjyo)	2006	Smile Again

== Music videos ==
Title	Year	Notes
"Come Back to Me"	2003	
"Once, Just Once"	2003	
"Baby I Like You Like That"	2003	
"Passion"	2004	
"Tattoo"	2004	
"Crazy"	2004	
"Hikari"	2005	
"Chiriboshi"	2005	
"Style"	2005	
"Start Line"	2005	
"I Know" (feat. Teddy)	2006	
"Come Back to Me Part 2"	2006	
"I Wanna..."	2006	
"Be Good to You"	2006	
"La La La"	2006	
"Aitai"	2007	
"Ari no Mama"	2007	
"La La La (Remix)"	2007	
"All Night Long" (feat. Ivy)	2007	
"Girls" (feat. Lil' Kim)	2008	
"Better Together"	2010	
"Better Together" (Dance Version)	2010	
"I'm Going Crazy"	2010	features Park Han-byul
"Somebody Else"	2012	
"When I Can't Sing"	2012	features G-Dragon
"Somebody Else" (Korean version)	2012	
"Love Again"	2012	
"Thank U"	2013	
"Rainbow"	2016	
"I'm Good"	2016	
"Give It to Me"	2016	
"Dangerman"	2016	
