= Wheesung discography =

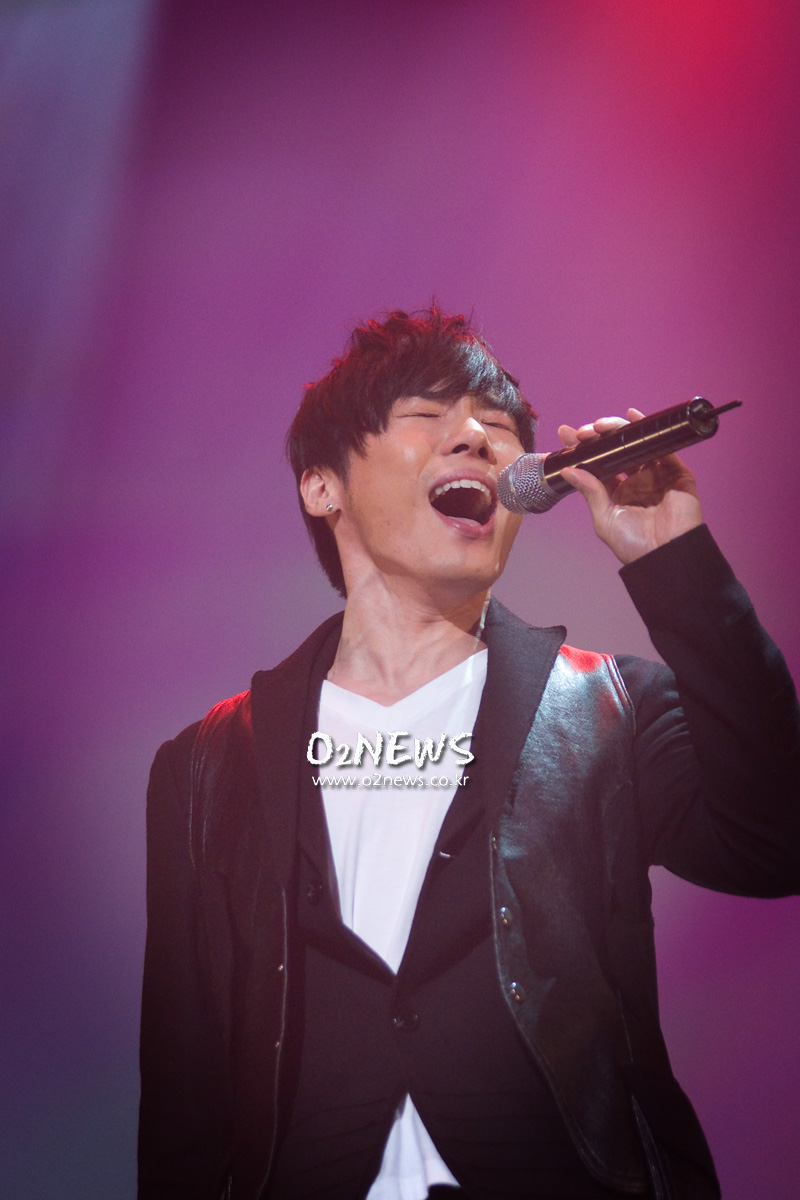
- Studio albums: 6
- Extended plays: 5
- Singles: 41
- Single albums: 2
- Soundtrack albums: 13

The discography of South Korean singer Wheesung consists of six studio albums, six extended plays, and two single albums.

== Studio albums ==
Title	Album details	Peak chart positions		Sales
Title	Album details	KOR RIAK	KOR Gaon	Sales
Like a Movie	Released: April 2, 2002; Label: YG Entertainment; Format: CD, cassette; Track listing: 1. Intro; 2. ..안되나요..; 3. 전할 수 없는 이야기; 4. 악몽(惡夢); 5. 아직도; 6. You Are the Only One; 7. Magic Eye; 8. Interlude; 9. 떠나; 10. 제발; 11. 하늘에서; 12. 후애(後愛); 13. Feel the Night; 14. Incomplete	8	—	KOR: 203,566
It's Real	Released: August 21, 2003; Label: YG Entertainment; Format: CD, cassette; Track listing: 1. Intro; 2. Set Me Free; 3. 다시 만난 날 4. I Am Missing You; 5. With Me; 6. 사랑하지 않을 거라면; 7. Player; 8. 말을 해줘; 9. Interlude; 10. Dilemma; 11. 미워하고 싶은데; 12. Pretty Lady; 13. 미인; 14. Angel; 15. Outro; 16. Bonus track: Luz Control (feat. Seven & Lexy)	1	—	KOR: 406,959
For the Moment	Released: October 15, 2004; Label: YG Entertainment; Format: CD, cassette; Track listing: 1. Intro; 2. 탈피; 3. 누구와 사랑을 하다가; 4. 내 눈물보다; 5. 불치병 (feat. Masta Wu); 6. 하나가 더해진 생일; 7. Skit Part1. 박.갑.성 VS.삼오십오 (일산 집으로 가다가); 8. Corea New School 제비 스딸 (feat. Teddy of 1TYM); 9. 7days 10. 사랑은 (feat. Lee Ji-young of Big Mama); 11. Skit Part2. 삼오십오 VS 박.갑.(광주여고로 가다가); 12. Clubbin' (feat. Jinu of Jinusean); 13. She's Beautiful; 14. 일생을 (Remake); 15. Dear My Friend (feat. 이정, Wanted 하동균); 16. Outro; 17. Bonus track: It'z Time (Thanx to Masta Wu)	2	—	KOR: 209,707
Love... Love...? Love...!	Released: September 21, 2005; Label: YG Entertainment; Format: CD, cassette; Track listing: 1. 가을에 내리는 눈 2. 일년이면; 3. 울보; 4. 하늘을 걸어서; 5. Good-Bye Luv..; 6. 하나 둘 셋 넷 7. 왜 나만; 8. 날아가다; 9. Luv Shine; 10. 내가 너를 잊는다; 11. 가 12. Morning; 13. Too Hot; 14. 사랑 한 장 15. 내 사람; 16. 커다란..너무 커다란..; 17. With Me (Mr)	2	—	KOR: 159,062
Eternal Essence of Music	Released: September 4, 2007; Label: OrangeShock Entertainment; Format: CD, cassette; Track listing: 1. Love Hero (feat. J); 2. My Way; 3. 사랑은 맛있다♡; 4. 다쳐도 좋아; 5. 차안남녀; 6. 안녕히 계시죠; 7. 어쩌다 보니 비밀; 8. Savannah Woman (feat. Verbal Jint); 9. 이런 시츄에이션; 10. 만져주기 (feat. Younha); 11. Tick Tock; 12. 이별 앞에 서서; 13. 벌 14. Bonus track: Against All Odds	—	—	
Vocolate	Released: October 8, 2009; Label: POP/UP Entertainment; Format: CD, digital download; Track listing: 1. Over U 2. 사랑..그 몹쓸병 (Love… That Cruel Disease); 3. 주르륵 (Trickling); 4. 눈물 쏟고 또 쏟고 (Tears Keep Flowing and Flowing); 5. Rose; 6. 네 심장이 쉬는 날 (Your Heart's Resting Day); 7. Alone; 8. Show Me Girl; 9. One Kiss; 10. Girls; 11. 사랑해.. (I Love You…); 12. 타임머신 (Time Machine)	—	—	
"—" denotes release did not chart. Note: The Gaon Music Chart was established in 2010.

== Extended plays ==
Title	Album details	Peak chart positions	Sales
Title	Album details	KOR Gaon	Sales
With All My Heart and Soul	Released: October 29, 2008; Label: OrangeShock Entertainment; Format: CD, digital download; Track listing: 1. Real Slow Gotta Go Again; 2. 완벽한 남자 (The Perfect Man); 3. 별이 지다.. (Fading Star); 4. Interlude with 효리; 5. Choco Luv; 6. Prayer 4 Soul (feat. Lovelyn); 7. 나락(奈落); 8. 별이 지다.. (inst.)	—	
They Are Coming	Released: October 10, 2011; Label: YMC Entertainment; Format: CD, digital download; Track listing: 1. 놈들이 온다 (The Guys Are Coming); 2. Music; 3. UUU; 4. OJ; 5. Oh Lonely	9	KOR: 4,766
The Best Man	Released: May 12, 2014; Label: YMC Entertainment; Format: CD, digital download; Track listing: 1. Best Man; 2. 노래가 좋아 (I Like the Music); 3. Night and Day; 4. 네 옆에 누워 (Lie Next to You); 5. 너라는 명작 (Masterpiece of You) [2014 remastered version]; 6. 모르고 싶다 (I Don't Want to Know); 7. 돈 벌어야 돼 (Need to Make Money)	4	KOR: 6,102
Transformation	Released: June 14, 2016; Label: YMC Entertainment; Format: CD, digital download; Track listing: 1. Marry Me (feat. Sangchu of Mighty Mouth); 2. Hold Over (feat. LE of EXID); 3. 노래 좀 꺼줘요; 4. 얼마짜리 사랑 (with Bumkey, feat. Jessi); 5. 친구로 남아줄게 (with Geeks); 6. 아무일 없었다는 듯 (with Ali); 7. Kiss (with Ailee)	9	KOR: 2,749
In Space (우주속에서)	Released: October 11, 2018; Label: Realslow Company, DreamcatcherHQ; Format: Digital download; Track listing: 1. 우주속에서 (In Space); 2. BREAKING DOWN; 3. Rainy Day (with Chungha & Taeil, remixed by Antik); 4. 기적이 일어났으면 좋겠어 (I hope the miracle happens); 5. Present	—	
"—" denotes release did not chart. Note: The Gaon Music Chart was established in 2010.

== Single albums ==
Title	Album details	Peak chart positions	Sales
Title	Album details	KOR Gaon	Sales
Realslow Is Back	Released: August 29, 2010; Label: POP/UP Entertainment; Format: CD, digital download; Track listing: 1. 결혼까지 생각했어; 2. Rose; 3. 사랑 그 몹쓸병; 4. 결혼까지 생각했어 (inst.); 5. Rose (inst.); 6. 사랑 그 몹쓸병 (inst.)	1	KOR: 22,466
Heartsore Story	Released: March 15, 2011; Label: YMC Entertainment; Format: CD, digital download; Track listing: 1. 가슴 시린 이야기; 2. 설마; 3. 아는 사람; 4. 가슴 시린 이야기 (inst.); 5. 설마 (inst.); 6. 아는 사람 (inst.)	-	

== Singles ==
=== As lead artist ===
Title	Year	Peak chart position	Sales (Downloads)	Album
Title	Year	KOR Gaon	Sales (Downloads)	Album
"The Story That Can't Be Told" (전할 수 없는 이야기)	2002	—		Like a Movie
"Can't I..." (안되나요..)	2002	51	KOR: 46,062	Like a Movie
"Still" (아직도)	2002	—		Like a Movie
"I'm Missing You"	2003	—		It's Real
"With Me"	2003	23	KOR: 239,779	It's Real
"The Day We Met Again" (다시 만난 날)	2003	76	KOR: 29,245	It's Real
"Fall in Love With Someone" (누구와 사랑을 하다가)	2004	—		For the Moment
"Incurable Disease" (불치병) (feat. Masta Wu)	2004	—		For the Moment
"Good-bye Luv"	2005	—		Love... Love...? Love...!
"A Year Gone By" (일년이면)	2005	84	KOR: 26,278	Love... Love...? Love...!
"Walking on the Sky" (하늘을 걸어서)	2005	—		Love... Love...? Love...!
"Against All Odds"	2006	—		Eternal Essence of Music
"Delicious Love" (사랑은 맛있다♡)	2007	—		Eternal Essence of Music
"It's Okay if I Get Hurt" (다쳐도 좋아)	2007	—		Eternal Essence of Music
"Love Seat" (feat. Taru, Humming Urban Stereo)	2008	—		Non-album singles
"We're Not Crazy" (우린 미치지 않았어) (with D.O)	2008	—		Non-album singles
"Fading Star" (별이 지다)	2008	—		With All My Heart And Soul
"Insomnia" (불면증)	2009	45	KOR: 104,444	Non-album single
"Rain Falling" (주르륵)	2009	—		Vocolate
"Tears Keep Flowing" (눈물 쏟고 또 쏟고)	2009	—		Vocolate
"In a Dream" (꿈에)	2010	84		The Artist (Cho Deok-bae 25th Anniversary Album)
"Even Thought of Marriage" (결혼까지 생각했어)	2010	3	KOR: 2,236.385	Realslow Is Back (single album)
"Heartsore Story" (가슴 시린 이야기) (feat. Yong Jun-hyung)	2011	3	KOR: 2,442,295	Heartsore Story (single album)
"They Are Coming" (놈들이 온다)	2011	7	KOR: 955,791	They Are Coming
"Should I Catch the Flu?" (감기라도 걸릴까) (with Lee Seung-woo)	2012	34	KOR: 313,607	Non-album single
"Masterpiece of You" (너라는 명작)	2012	13	KOR: 519,658	The Best Man
"Special Love" (with Gummy)	2013	3	KOR: 846,161	Non-album singles
"Ho Ho Hobbang" (호호호빵) (with Kim Tae-woo)	2014	55	KOR: 56,714	Non-album singles
"I Don't Want to Know" (모르고 싶다)	2014	53	KOR: 44,715	The Best Man
"Night and Day"	2014	4	KOR: 666,198	The Best Man
"How Much Is Your Love?" (얼마짜리 사랑) (with Bumkey, feat. Jessi)	2014	15	KOR: 89,078	Transformation
"I'll Stay as Your Friend" (친구로 남아줄게) (with Geeks)	2014	21	KOR: 189,574	Transformation
"As If Nothing Happened" (아무일 없었다는 듯) (with Ali)	2014	14	KOR: 140,150	Transformation
"Kiss" (with Ailee)	2015	30	KOR: 84,057	Transformation
"Real Love Song" (진짜 사랑 노래) (with Soulstar)	2016	—		Non-album single
"Hold Over" (제껴) (feat. LE of EXID)	2016	38	KOR: 46,206	Transformation
"Aroma" (feat. Hash Swan)	2017	86	KOR: 23,838	Non-album singles
"Lovin' Hobbang" (호빵이 좋아) (with Kim Tae-woo)	2017	—		Non-album singles
"Are You Dating..?" (연애는 하니..?)	2017	92	KOR: 16,551	Non-album singles
"In Space" (우주속에서)	2018	—		In Space
"Remember" (생각난다)	2019	—		Non-album single
"—" denotes release did not chart. Note: The Gaon Music Chart was established in 2010.

=== As featured artist ===
Title	Year	Peak chart position	Album
Title	Year	KOR Gaon	Album
"I Love You Noona" (사랑해 누나) (Verbal Jint feat. Wheesung)	2001	—	Modern Rhymes
"Don Quixote" (돈키호테) (P-Type feat. Wheesung)	2004	—	Heavy Bass
"A. U Ready?" (Gil Gun feat. Wheesung)	2006	—	Baby G
"I Did" (그랬단 말이야) (Shin So-hee feat. Wheesung, Lee Seung-chul, Yoon Do-hyun, Hong Kyung-min & Bobby Kim)	2008	—	I Did
"Love Tension" (Yoo Byeong-ryeol feat. Wheesung & Nassun)	2010	—	YBY 1st Mini Album
"Nice to Meet You" (처음 뵙겠습니다) (G.NA feat. Wheesung)	2011	29	Black & White
"Stranger" (남보다 못한 사이) (Baby Soul feat. Wheesung)	2011	27	Non-album single
"Peppermint Chocolate" (썸남썸녀) (K.Will & Mamamoo feat. Wheesung)	2014	10	Hello
"Me, Myself & I" (Heize feat. Jessi & Wheesung)	2015	19	Unpretty Rapstar 2
"Come to Me" (날 보러 와요) (Yeoeun feat. Wheesung)	2015	—	Non-album singles
"Andenayon" (안되나용) (Kim Young-chul feat. Wheesung)	2018	85	Non-album singles
"Do The Dance" (Shijin feat. Wheesung)	2018	—	Non-album singles
"Coming Snow" (눈이 올 텐데) (SE O feat. Wheesung)	2019	—	The Master of Producer Part 3
"Movin' on" (feat. Wheesung)	2021	—	1≠1
"Do or Die" (feat. Wheesung)	2022	—	EGO 90’S
"—" denotes release did not chart. Note: The Gaon Music Chart was established in 2010.

== Soundtrack appearances ==
Title	Year	Peak chart position	Album
Title	Year	KOR Gaon	Album
"Reminiscence" (회상)	2004	—	A Moment to Remember OST
"The Crescent Moon" (손톱달)	2006	—	The Restless OST
"In All One's Life" (살아서도.. 죽어서도..)	2008	—	The Kingdom of the Winds OST
"Rain Drop"	2009	—	On the Way Home OST
"Even If the World Separates Us" (세상이 우릴 갈라도)	2010	38	Road No. 1 OST
"My Way"	2010	95	Dr. Champ OST
"Path of Tears" (눈물길)	2012	16	Moon Embracing the Sun OST
"For You"	2014	38	It's Okay, That's Love OST
"See You Soon" (다녀와요)	2015	—	Glamorous Temptation OST
"Again" (자꾸만)	2016	—	Beautiful Gong Shim OST
"Monologue" (독백)	2018	—	Should We Kiss First? OST
"The Reason I Have Waited" (내가 기다리는 이유)	2018	—	The Ghost Detective OST
"FANTASY"	2022	—	Sponsor OST
"—" denotes release did not chart. Note: The Gaon Music Chart was established in 2010.

== Music videos ==
Release	Song Titile	Links
1998	Good bye	MV appearance
1999	용서해 줄래 (Will You Forgive Me)	A4
1999	사랑때문에 (Because of Love)	A4
2002.04.03	안되나요 (Can't I...? ) In the Mood for Love KR Promotion Song	
2002.04.03	안되나요...립싱크버젼 (Can't I...?)	Long ver
2002.04.03	전할 수 없는 이야기 (The Story That Can't Be Told)	
2002.04.03	아직도 (Still)	
2002.10.24	YMCA 야구단	
2003.02.01	Gummy - 그대 돌아오면 (If You Come Back)	MV appearance
2003.08.21	다시 만난 날 (The Day We Met Again)	
2003.08.21	With Me	
2003.08.21	I`m Missing You	
2004.10.16	불치병 (Incurable Disease)(feat. Masta Wu)	
2004.10.16	불치병 (Incurable Disease)(feat. Masta Wu)	Ver 2
2004.10.16	누구와 사랑을 하다가 (Fall in Love with Someone)	
2004.12.20	그날이 오면 (When That Day Comes)	
2005.09.22	일년이면 (A Year Gone By)	
2005.09.22	하늘을 걸어서 (Walk in the Sky) Movie 야수 Beast OST	
2005.09.22	Good Bye Luv	
2005.09.22	Luv Shine	
2006.04.17	Against All Odds	
2006.11.30	손톱달 (The Crescent Moon) 중천의 기억 OST	
2007.09.11	사랑은 맛있다 (Delicious Love)	
2007.11.13	다쳐도 좋아 (It’s Okay If I Get Hurt) Infernal Affairs KR Promotion Song	
2008.01.10	Smile Again	
2008.04.01	Love Seat	
2008.05.22	우린 미치지 않았어 (We're Not Crazy)	
2008.06.25	그랬단 말이야	
2008.10.15	살아서도 죽어서도 (in life and death)	
2008.11.05	별이 지다 (Fading Star)	
2009.02.18	Insomnia (불면증)	
2009.04.02	Rain Drop (with G.Gorilla) 우리집에 왜왔니 OST	
2009.10.14	주르륵 (Rain Falling)	
2010.07.01	세상이 우릴 갈라도 (Even If the World Separates Us)	
2010.08.20	결혼까지 생각했어 (Even Thought of Marriage)	
2010.11.10	선물 (Gift)	
2010.11.02	My Way Dr. Champ OST	
2011.03.14	가슴 시린 이야기 (Heartsore Story) (feat. Junhyung)	
2011.03.24	가슴 시린 이야기 (Heartsore Story) (feat. Junhyung)	Ver 2
2011.10.10	놈들이 온다 (They Are Coming)	
2012.06.07	감기라도 걸릴까? (Should I Catch the Flu?)	
2014.05.11	Night and Day (나잇앤데이)	
2014.06.03	MAMAMOO - Mr.애매모호 (Mr.Ambiguous)	MV appearance
2014.06.05	모르고싶다 (I Don't Want to Know) Movie 하이힐 High Heels OST	
2014.08.24	얼마짜리 사랑 (How Much Is Your Love) (With Bumkey feat. Jessi)	
2015.12.07	다녀와요 Glamorous Temptation OST	
2016.06.13	제껴 (Hold Over) (feat. LE of EXID)	
2016.07.20	자꾸만 (Again) Beautiful Gong Shim OST	
2017.10.22	Aroma (아로마) (feat. Hash Swan)	
2017.10.23	Aroma (아로마) (feat. Hash Swan)	Directorscut Ver
2018.02.17	안되나용	
2018.10.04	내가 기다리는 이유 The Ghost Detective OST	
2018.10.11	우주속에서 (In Space)	
2018.10.11	기적이 일어났으면 좋겠어 (Miracle)	
2018.10.11	Breaking Down	
2018.11.19	하나가 되어	
2018.12.08	Settle	
2019.05.13	생각난다	
2022.03.02	FANTASY	

== Lyrics and compositions ==
=== Korea Music Copyright Association ===
Name	Registration	Number	Songs
Wheesung	최휘성/ 휘성/ 휘성 REALSLOW	W0467700	

=== 1999 ===
Song title	Singer	Lyrics	Composition	Arrangement/ Reference
1999
1588-7179	A4	A4(Wheesung, Steve, Jay Lee, Austin)		

=== 2001 - 2005 ===
Song title	Singer	Lyrics	Composition	Arrangement/ Reference
2001
Make It Right & Remix	Jang Na-ra	Wheesung		
약속 Promise	Jang Na-ra	Wheesung		
Blue	Jang Na-ra	Wheesung		
2002
악몽 Nightmare	Wheesung	Wheesung		
2003
Luz Control	SE7EN	Wheesung		
아쉬운이별 Say Goodbye	SE7EN	Wheesung		
Pretty Lady	Wheesung	Wheesung		
Dilemma	Wheesung	Wheesung		
말을해줘 Tell Me	Wheesung	Wheesung 우양영		
내게서벗어나 Away from Me	렉시 Lexy	Wheesung		
2004
Real Luv Story	Taebin 태빈 1TYM	Wheesung		
널보낼께 I Will Send You	태빈 Taebin 1TYM	Wheesung		
Honey I Know	SE7EN	Wheesung		
Round1	Gummy	Wheesung		
그녀보다내가뭐가 What Do I Tell Her	Gummy	Wheesung		
It'z Time & Masta Wu version	Wheesung	Wheesung MASTA WU		
Corea New School 제비스딸	Wheesung	Wheesung		
She's Beautiful	Wheesung	Wheesung		
2005
그녀에게 Her	Lyn	Wheesung	Wheesung	
기꺼이 Gladly	렉시 Lexy feat. Gummy	Wheesung		
Most Wanted	Joosuc	에릭 Joosuc Wheesung		
Trap	Gummy	Wheesung		
커다란너무커다란 Outro	Wheesung	Wheesung		
가	Wheesung	최갑원 Wheesung		
Luv Shine	Wheesung	Wheesung	Wheesung	
날아가다 (Interlude)	Wheesung	Wheesung		
왜나만 Why Am I	Wheesung	Wheesung		
일년이면 A Year Gone By	Wheesung	Wheesung		

=== 2006 - 2010 ===
Song title	Singer	Lyrics	Composition	Arrangement/ Reference
2006
내입좀막아줘 Block My Mouth	SE7EN	Wheesung		
벌레	SE7EN	Wheesung		
Love Story	SE7EN	Wheesung		
Hot-Time Lover	하동균 Ha Dong-kyun	최갑원 Wheesung		
2007
&Design	문근영 Moon Geun Young	Wheesung		
좋아 Okay	Ivy	Wheesung	Wheesung	
이별이다그렇죠 All Separation is Like This	Ivy	Wheesung		
1 to 10	Ivy	Wheesung		
Cupido	Ivy	Wheesung		
이별살이 Diary of Separation	Lyn	Wheesung	Wheesung	
어린욕심 Young Lust	Younha	Wheesung	Wheesung	
비밀번호486 Password 486	Younha	Wheesung		
벌 Punishment	Wheesung	Wheesung		
Tick Tock	Wheesung	Wheesung		
만져주기 Soothing Touch	Wheesung feat. Younha	Wheesung		
사랑은맛있다 Love Is Delicious	Wheesung	Wheesung		
애착 Attachment	Tim	Wheesung		
수천번잠들고깨어나도	제이 J	Wheesung	Wheesung 이종훈	
2008
나쁘고아픈나 The Bad Me Who Is Hurt	Davichi	Wheesung		
사랑해주세요 Please Love	이경선 Lee Kyung Seon	Wheesung		
그게사랑이야 That's Love	Joo	Wheesung		
입다질린옷	Son Dam-bi	Wheesung		
태양의나라	Kil Gun	Wheesung		
여우가 Fox CZQ remix	문지은 Moon Ji Eun	Wheesung		
여우가 Fox	문지은 Moon Ji Eun FEAT 은지원 Eun Ji Won	Wheesung		
Happy 세레나데 Happy Serenade	고유진 Go Yoo Jin	Wheesung		
우린미치지않았어 We're Not Crazy & original & inst.	Wheesung	Wheesung		
물랑루즈 Moulin Rouge	배치기 Baechigi	Wheesung 이기철 정무웅	Wheesung 이명재	
Player	TGUS	Wheesung		
유혹의소나타 Sonata of Temptation	Ivy	Wheesung		
웃으며만나 Goodbye with Smile	The Name	Wheesung	Wheesung	
사랑이별그리고추억 Love, Separation and Memories	The Name	Wheesung		
오늘도너만사랑해 Today Too, I Love You	The Name	Wheesung		
Hey Mr Big	Lee Hyori	Wheesung		
Sexy Boy	Lee Hyori with Wheesung	Wheesung		
Lesson	이효리	Wheesung 차은택		
헤픈여자 Slut & inst.	일락 Ilac	Wheesung		
낭만전설 Romantic Legend	Kim Woo-joo	Wheesung		
Urban Fever	Shin Hye-sung FEAT. $HOWGUN	Wheesung		
그녀가헤어졌다 (OT:One for Me)	SHINee	Wheesung Alex Cantrall		
사랑의길 (OT:LOves Way)	SHINee	Wheesung Alex Cantrall		
낙원 (OT:Paradise)	TVXQ	Wheesung; Kevin Kumar; Sean Kumar		
나락	Wheesung	Wheesung		
Prayer 4 Soul	Wheesung feat. Lovelyn	Wheesung	Wheesung	
Choco Luv	Wheesung	Wheesung	Wheesung	
Interlude	Wheesung with 효리	Wheesung		
별이지다 Fading Star & inst.	Wheesung	Wheesung		
완벽한남자 The Perfect Man	Wheesung	Wheesung		
2009
어쩌다보니비밀 This kind of situation	Wheesung	Wheesung		
사랑이 죽는 병 Love Disease	Super Junior	Sean Alexander; Jimmy Burney; Pascal Guyon; Wheesung		
사랑이그래요 Real Love	Oh Jong-hyuk	Wheesung		
Insomnia（불면증）	Wheesung	Craig David; James Washington; Wheesung		
Girls	Wheesung	Wheesung 김진태		
Heaven	Ailee	Wheesung	서용배 Wheesung 이기	
One Kiss	Wheesung	Wheesung; Steven Lee; Sean Alexande		
Run	SE7EN	Wheesung SE7EN		
Show Me Girl	Wheesung	Wheesung	Wheesung	
Supa Luv & A-Rex remix & inst.	Teen Top	Redd Stylez Wheesung		
Sweet Delight	Jessica Jung	Wheesung		SPC CF Song
Sweet Rainday	Ock Joo-hyun	옥주현	Wheesung	
Watch Out	태완 Tae Wan	Wheesung		
Without You	Ray	Wheesung		
난이제어쩌죠 What Should I Do	동유리 Yuri	동 Wheesung		
남자답게 Be a Man	MBLAQ	미르 Wheesung	서용배 Wheesung 이기	
너라는명작 Masterpiece of You	Wheesung	Wheesung		
널보낼게 I'll Let You Go	태빈 Taebin 1TYM	김도훈	Wheesung	
네까짓게 How Dare You	태군 Taegoon	Wheesung	Wheesung	
네심장이쉬는날 Your Heart's Resting Day	Wheesung	Wheesung	Wheesung Donnie J	
눈물쏟고또쏟고 Tears Keep Flowing and Flowing	Wheesung	Wheesung		
눈물이마르면 (OT:When the Tears Run Dry)	Brian Joo	Wheesung; Robbins Lindy; Alex Cantrall		
다그렇지	Tykeys	Wheesung		
단짝 (OT:Top Down) My Best Friend	Girls' Generation	Wheesung		
돈키호테 Don Quixote	P-Type	Wheesung P-Type		
맹부삼천지교/꿈	민훈	임보경 Wheesung		
사랑그몹쓸병 Love That Cruel Disease & new ver. & inst.	Wheesung	강은경	이현도 Wheesung	
랑끝났다 Overnight	고유진 Go Yoo Jin	Wheesung; Kennedy Eliot; John White Francis Eg		
선택 Chosen	지은 Jieun	Wheesung		
세상의반 Half the World	별 Byul feat. Hoocy	Wheesung	Wheesung	
슈퍼스타 Superstar	태군 Taegoon	Wheesung		
이노래때문에 Because of This Song	미스티 Misty	Wheesung 미스티		
주르륵 Rain Falling	Wheesung	Wheesung	Wheesung	
침묵애	Ray	Wheesung		
탈피 Escape	Wheesung	Wheesung		
구해줘 Save Me & Mr & acoustic ver.	박태진 Park Taejin	Wheesung		
2010
OVER U	Wheesung	Wheesung		
치유 Healing	TRAX	Wheesung		
너때문에미쳐 I Go Crazy Because of You & remix ver.	T-ara	Wheesung		
괜히내가 I'm So Sorry	M to M 엠투엠	Wheesung		
사랑해U I Love U & Lovely ver.	Seo In-guk	Wheesung		
그 자리에서 널	A:ga 아 가)	Wheesung		
사랑이죄겠니	M tO M 엠투엠	Wheesung		
Hero & inst.	Sori 김소리	Wheesung	C-LUV Wheesung	김태완 Wheesung
세상이우릴갈라도 Even If the World Separates Us & piano ver.	Wheesung	Wheesung		
Supa Solo	G.NA	Wheesung		
꺼져줄게잘살아	G.NA	Wheesung		
애기야 My Baby U	Seo In-guk	라이머 Wheesung		
맴맴맴	바비킴 Bobby Kim	Wheesung 손창일		
Rose & D.O ver & inst	Wheesung feat. Double K	Wheesung Double K		
결혼까지생각했어 Even Thought of Marriage & inst.	Wheesung	Wheesung		
I'm Ok (OT:Got Me Hypnotized)	보아 Boa	Wheesung		
겨울나무 Winter Trees	SG Wannabe	Wheesung		
아잉 A-ing & inst.	Orange Caramel	Wheesung		

=== 2011 - 2015 ===
Song title	Singer	Lyrics	Composition	Arrangement/ Reference
2011
꺼져줄게잘살아 (English ver.)	G.NA	최지나 Wheesung		
처음뵙겠습니다 Nice to Meet You	G.NA with Wheesung	Wheesung		
ALONE	Wheesung	Wheesung Steven Lee; Jenson Vaugha		
아는사람 Someone I Know & inst.	Wheesung	Wheesung	Wheesung 전군	
설마 Surely & inst.	Wheesung	Wheesung	옥정용 Wheesung	
가슴시린이야기 Heartsore Story 心冷的言語 & inst.	Wheesung	Wheesung		
아파아이야 It Hurts & inst.	양파 Yangpa	Wheesung		
못된것만배워서 Only Learned Bad Things	B1A4	Wheesung		
Yes	Lim Jeong-hee	Wheesung		
오아시스 Oasis & inst.	4MEN FEAT. 라도 원택	Wheesung		
My Baby	Kim Bum Soo	Wheesung	Wheesung	
Top Girl	G.NA	Wheesung		
Oh Lonely	Wheesung	Wheesung	문하 Wheesung	
OJ	Wheesung	Wheesung	문하 Wheesung	
UUU	Wheesung	Wheesung		
놈들이온다 They Are Coming	Wheesung	Wheesung		
Music	Wheesung	Wheesung	Wheesung Donnie J	
뭐야뭐야 What What	C-REAL 씨리얼	이주헌 Wheesung		
사귀어줄래 Be with Me & inst. & MR	페이스 Face	Wheesung		
2012
내꺼였는데 You Were Mine	2AM	Wheesung		
눈물길	Wheesung	Wheesung	문하 Wheesung	
그입술을뺏었어 Irresistible Lips	BTOB	Wheesung		
기라도걸릴까 Should I Catch the Flu?	Wheesung SOULSTAR	최갑원 Wheesung	PJ Wheesung	
마법소녀 Magic Girl	Orange Caramel	Wheesung		
U Can Do It	유리 Yuri	Wheesung	문하 Wheesung	
Heaven	Ailee	Wheesung	서용배 Wheesung 이기	King of Mask Singer
Shut Up	Ailee	Wheesung Simon D.	문하 Wheesung	
2013
말돌리지마 Don't Say Anything	알리 ALI	Wheesung	문하 Wheesung	김문하 Wheesung
Special Love	Wheesung Gummy	Wheesung		
2014
노래가늘었어 Singing Got Better	Ailee	Wheesung	문하 Wheesung	
썸남썸녀 Peppermint Chocolate	K.Will Mamamoo feat. Wheesung	Wheesung 김이나		
뒤에서안아줘 Back Hug	Lyn	Wheesung	문하 Wheesung 귓방망이	문하 Wheesung 귓방망이
마지막악수 Last Handshake	Lim Chan Jung	Wheesung	문지영 Wheesung	문지영 Wheesung
Hello Baby	NC.A	Wheesung	문하 Wheesung	
토닥토닥 Pat Pat	영지 Young Ji	Wheesung 아웃사이더		
Sick of You	B-Rock 비록	서용배 신기수; Wheesung 이기	서용배	신기수 Wheesung 이기
돈벌어야돼 Need To Make Money	Wheesung	Wheesung	문하 Wheesung	
모르고싶다 I Don't Want to Know You	Wheesung	Wheesung		
Night and Day	Wheesung	Wheesung		
노래가좋아 I Like Singing	Wheesung	Wheesung		
Best Man	Wheesung	Wheesung		
What Is Luv	Ali	Loco Wheesung		
지금행복하세요 Be Happy Now	Gummy	Wheesung	문하 Wheesung 최희준	
사랑했으니됐어 I Loved... Have No Regrets	Gummy	Wheesung		
뒤로걷기 Walk Backward & acoustic ver.	투빅 2BiC	Wheesung		
갈곳이없어 Nowhere to Go	Gummy	Wheesung	문하 Wheesung	문하 Wheesung
나만의길 My Way	Bobby Kim	권진아 Wheesung Double K		
아무일없었다는듯 As If Nothing	Wheesung 알리 Ali	Wheesung	황승찬 Wheesung 최희준	
2015
할렐루야 Hallelujah	Kim Jong-hyun	Wheesung 임광욱; HARAMBASIC NERMIN; MULHOLLAND MARTIN		
Kiss	Wheesung Ailee	Wheesung		
내맘이 My Heart	혜이니 Heyne	노영주 Wheesung		
Ga In feat. Dok2	Wheesung Dok2			
노래가늘었어 Singing Got Better	김민선	Wheesung	문하 Wheesung	

=== 2016 - 2020 ===
Song title	Singer	Lyrics	Composition	Arrangement/ Reference
2016
그집앞 In Front of the House	Basick	김도훈 Wheesung 임상혁 Basick		
비밀번호486 Password 486	Lizzy	Wheesung		King of Mask Singer
살찐사랑 Excessive Love	Jessi	Wheesung	문하 Wheesung	문하 문지영 Wheesung
봄날에 On a Spring Day	Kim Yeon-ji (With 허각)	MAFLY1 김연지 Wheesung		
아잉 A-ing	Park Gyeong Lee Nine Muses (band) Horan Clazziquai Project	Wheesung		King of Mask Singer
2017
Luving U	Gummy	Wheesung	Monster Factory(1); Wheesung	
Aroma 아로마	Wheesung feat. Hash Swan	Hash Swan Wheesung	Room 102(1)(2)(3) Wheesung	
섬 Island	알리 Ali	Wheesung Scott Alan; Roy Alina Smith		
호빵이 좋아	Wheesung Kim Tae-woo (singer)	Wheesung		
2018
Do the Dance	시진 Sijin	Wheesung 시진	Gaka Wheesung	
Single Life	Wheesung Hwang Chi-yeul	Wheesung	Wheesung, Antik, Chae Tae-sik	Wheesung, Antik, Chae Tae-sik/The Call
Rainy Day	Wheesung Lee Tae-il Kim Chung-ha	Wheesung	Wheesung	PJT, Wheesung/The Call
MoonNight Blues	Wheesung Hwanhee	Wheesung	Wheesung, PJT	Wheesung, PJT/The Call
Dance the Night Away	Twice	Wheesung		
우주속에서 (In Space)	Wheesung	Wheesung	Wheesung ANTIK	ANTIK
BREAKING DOWN	Wheesung	Wheesung	TEITO	전현명 TEITO 강철
Rainy Day Remix	Wheesung Lee Tae-il Kim Chung-ha	Wheesung	Wheesung	ANTIK
기적이 일어났으면 좋겠어 (Miracle)	Wheesung	Wheesung	Wheesung ANTIK	ANTIK
Present	Wheesung	Wheesung	Wheesung 문지영	Wheesung 문지영 이선생
해 뜨는 방향 (Feat. 곽진언)	WAX	Wheesung PJT	PJT Wheesung	PJT Wheesung
2019
Untitled Love Song	Henry	Wheesung		
생각난다	Wheesung	Wheesung	Wheesung, ANTIK	ANTIK
자기야나는니여자니까	WELL		Wheesung	
사젤중	WELL		Wheesung	
2020
손가락질	니엘	Wheesung	Wheesung	ANTIK

=== 2021 - 2024 ===
Song title	Singer	Lyrics	Composition	Arrangement/ Reference
2021
너와 나의 내일	2F(신용재, 김원주)	PHENOMENOTES 3(Wheesung)	PHENOMENOTES 1, PHENOMENOTES 2, 정동환	PHENOMENOTES 1, PHENOMENOTES 2, 정동환
You Are The Reason	황치열	PHENOMENOTES 3(Wheesung)	PHENOMENOTES 1, PHENOMENOTES 2	서정진, 김두현
Movin' on	ANTIK	Wheesung	Wheesung, ANTIK	ANTIK
2022
말해봐요	RU.A.NA	PHENOMENOTES 3(Wheesung)	PHENOMENOTES 1, PHENOMENOTES 2, 정동환	PHENOMENOTES 1, PHENOMENOTES 2, 정동환
기적	민우혁, 소향	PHENOMENOTES 3(Wheesung)	PHENOMENOTES 1, PHENOMENOTES 2	황성제
FANTASY	Wheesung	Wheesung	Famous Bro, HYMAX, 서지은	HYMAX, 서지은
모래성	Davichi	Wheesung, 문지영	Wheesung, 문지영	Wheesung, 문지영
I Dream	이병찬	PHENOMENOTES 3(Wheesung)	PHENOMENOTES 1, PHENOMENOTES 2, 정동환	PHENOMENOTES 1, PHENOMENOTES 2, 정동환
Do or Die	Babylon	Wheesung	Wheesung, Dar'rell banks	Dar'rell banks
연락하고 싶은 이 밤	이민혁, 최유리	PHENOMENOTES 3(Wheesung)	PHENOMENOTES 1, PHENOMENOTES 2	한밤(MIDNIGHT)
마음의 날씨	김동현	PHENOMENOTES 3(Wheesung)	PHENOMENOTES 1, PHENOMENOTES 2, 강화성	PHENOMENOTES 1, PHENOMENOTES 2, 강화성
이별 앞에서 내가 후회하는 세가지	오전:오후	PHENOMENOTES 3(Wheesung)	PHENOMENOTES 1, PHENOMENOTES 2, 정동환	PHENOMENOTES 1, PHENOMENOTES 2, 정동환
Gift	이병찬	PHENOMENOTES 3(Wheesung)	PHENOMENOTES 1, PHENOMENOTES 2, 강화성	PHENOMENOTES 1, PHENOMENOTES 2, 강화성
2024
잊음	이병찬	PHENOMENOTES 3(Wheesung)	PHENOMENOTES 1, PHENOMENOTES 2, 권영찬	PHENOMENOTES 1, PHENOMENOTES 2, 권영찬
사랑이 너와 나에게	이병찬	PHENOMENOTES 3(Wheesung), PHENOMENOTES 1, PHENOMENOTES 2	PHENOMENOTES 1, PHENOMENOTES 2	정수완
