= I Am Seven =

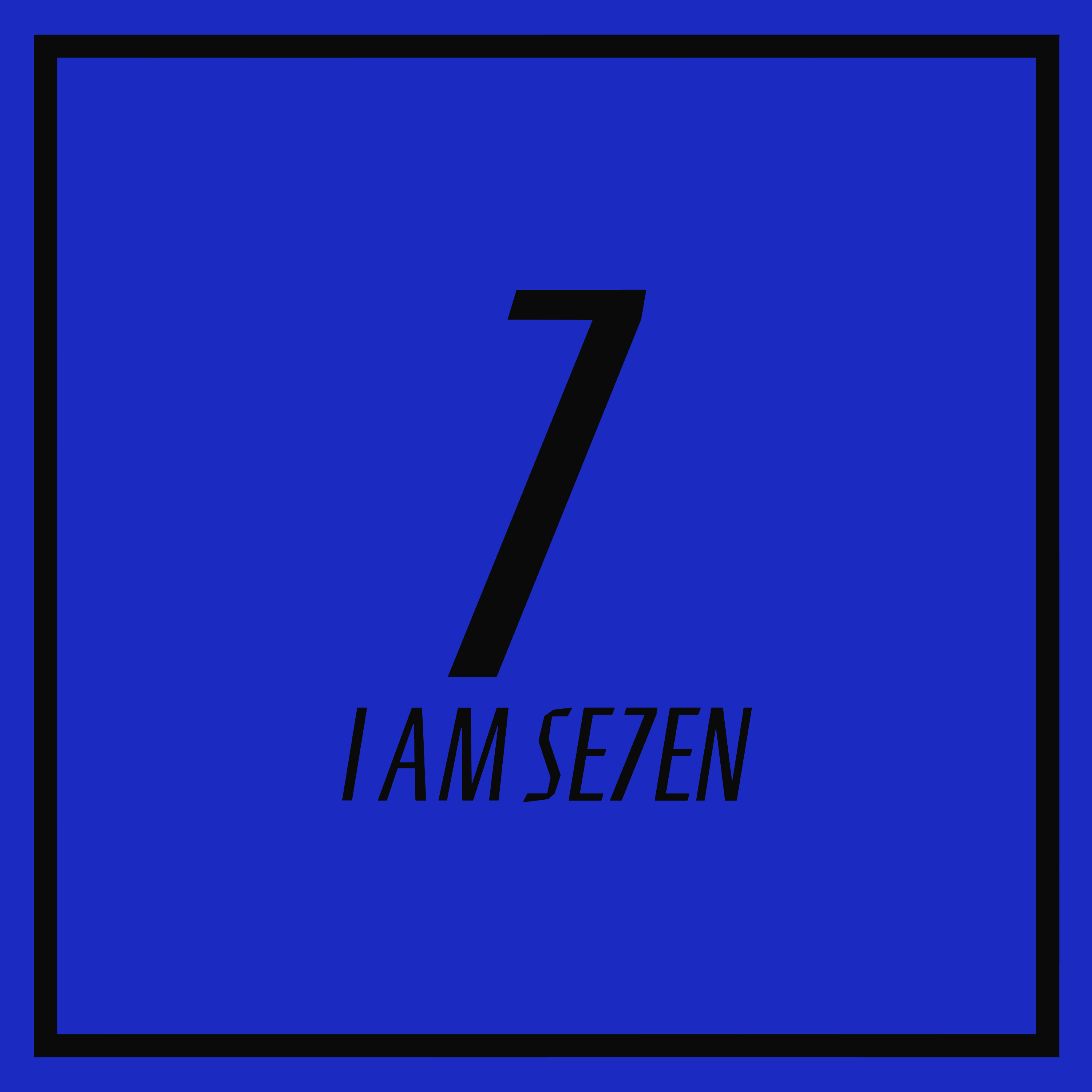

EP by Seven
- Released: October 14, 2016
- Recorded: 2014–16
- Genres: R&B, pop, dance, funk
- Length: 20:23
- Language: Korean
- Label: Eleven9 Entertainment

Seven chronology
Seven New Mini Album (2012)	I Am Seven (2016)	Dangerman (2016)

Singles from I Am Seven
- 1. "Give It to Me" Released: October 14, 2016

I Am Seven (stylized I AM SE7EN) is the third mini-album by South Korean recording artist Seven. It was released on October 14, 2016, under Eleven9 Entertainment and distributed by LOEN Entertainment. Following a hiatus lasting nearly five years, the record is his first release since his military service scandal in 2013 and departure from YG Entertainment the following year.

== Background ==
Seven was subject to conscription in South Korea and enlisted for military service on March 19, 2013. In June of that year, Seven was among three celebrities filmed "visiting illegal massage parlors that provide adult services while on official leave to perform at a concert"; he spent ten days in military prison for breaching regulations. As a result, he split from longstanding girlfriend Park Han-byul. He completed his service in December 2014; his contract with YG Entertainment expired the following February, with both parties mutually agreeing not to renew. In his first endeavor thereafter, Seven was cast in the musical Elisabeth (2015).

Seven's return to the music industry was first announced on December 31, 2015. In addition to Rain, MC Mong, and Shin Hye-sung, Seven was among the singers who experienced commercial success in the 2000s who planned to release music in 2016. Seven went on to invest ₩6,000,000,000 (US$4.48 million) in order to establish his own agency Eleven9 Entertainment. Scheduled to be released as early as March, the mini-album would be first record under the agency. The title I Am Seven represents a "fresh start" and serves as his reintroduction.

== Music structure ==
Seven took part in the songwriting, composing, and record production of all tracks on I Am Seven, a first in his career. Musically, the record encompasses R&B, pop, dance, and funk. "Give It to Me" is described as a "retro" funk song coupled with acoustic brass. Written in midst of his military service, "I'm Good" is slow-tempo R&B track.

== Release and promotion ==
A music video teaser for the song "I'm Good" was released on July 6, 2016; the full music video was published on the following day. I Am Seven was announced as Seven's third mini-album on the September 29, with a release date of October 14, four years and eight months after his previous release Seven New Mini Album (2012). On October 2, Seven previewed the lead single in Busan at the One Asia K-pop Concert. The music video teaser for "Give It to Me" was published on October 11.

I Am Seven and the music video for "Give It to Me" were simultaneously released on October 14. Initiating the day prior, Seven began promoting the song by performing it on weekly music chart shows, including Mnet's M Countdown, Korean Broadcasting System's (KBS) Music Bank, Seoul Broadcasting System's (SBS) Inkigayo, SBS MTV's The Show, and MBC Music's Show Champion.

== Critical reception ==
Writing for TV Daily, Kim Ji-ha commended I Am Seven for its "impressive" and "addictive" beats and melodies; Kim Han-gil described the record as being "filled with high-quality songs", which allowed Seven to create a "unique ambience". Rating the mini-album two and a half stars out of five, Lee Jong-min of Diffsound described it as a "reckless challenge" which resulted in a "crushing defeat". Due to his military scandal, the mini-album received negative sentiments on online music stores, where netizens contributed to the album's low ratings.

== Commercial performance ==
On the chart dated October 9–15, 2016, I Am Seven debuted at number eight on the Gaon Album Chart. By the end of the month, the record sold 4,285 copies in South Korea. In Japan, the mini-album debuted at number 245 on the weekly Oricon Albums Chart, selling 226 copies in its first week. It sold an additional 269 copies in its second week, ranking at number 233.

== Track listing ==
Track listing
No.	Title	Lyrics	Music	Arrangement	Length
1.	"Eleven9 (Intro)"	Seven	Seven, Dress	Dress	1:08
2.	"Good Night" (잘자; Jalja) (featuring Reddy)	Kush, Seven, Reddy	Kush, Seven, Seo Won-jin, Baek Gyeong-jin	Seo Won-jin	3:20
3.	"Give It to Me"	Seven, Mafly	The Stereotypes, Seven, Kam Parker, Henry	The Stereotypes	3:11
4.	"5-6-7"	Seven	Seven, Mads Eg Løkkegaard, Johannes Burger, Kilian Wilke	Løkkegaard, Burger, Wilke	2:59
5.	"11:30" (featuring Masta Wu)	Seven, Masta Wu	Seven, Jacob Olofsson, J-Son		3:20
6.	"I'm Good" (괜찮아; Gwaenchanha)	Seven	Seven	Seo Won-jin, Dress	3:14
7.	"Give It to Me (Inst.)"		The Stereotypes, Seven, Parker, Henry	The Stereotypes	3:11
Total length:					20:23

== Charts ==
Chart (2016)	Peak position
Gaon Album Chart	8
Oricon Albums Chart	233
