= They Are Coming =

EP by Wheesung
- Released: October 10, 2011
- Recorded: 2011
- Genre: R&B, hip hop
- Length: 18:04
- Language: Korean
- Label: YMC Entertainment

Wheesung chronology
Vocolate (2009)	They Are Coming (2011)	The Best Man (2014)

Singles from They Are Coming
- 1. "They Are Coming" Released: October 10, 2011

They Are Coming (Korean: 놈들이 온다; RR: Nomdeuri onda) is the second mini-album by South Korean recording artist Wheesung. It was released on October 10, 2011, under YMC Entertainment and distributed by CJ E&M Music. The record served as the final release before the singer enlisted in military service.

Following a video teaser, They Are Coming and the lead single of the same name were simultaneously released; the mini-album debuted and peaked at number nine on the Gaon Album Chart. In spite of various health issues, Wheesung promoted the record on music chart programs across television networks by performing the single.

== Background ==
In February 2011, it was announced that Wheesung would be subject to conscription in South Korea, and was scheduled to enlist for military service within the final two months of the year. They Are Coming served as his final release prior to his enlistment on November 7.

== Music structure ==
Musically, They Are Coming is an R&B and hip hop record. It begins with the opening track "Music". An uptempo song, the lyrics are a reflection of Wheesung's career in the ten years prior. "They Are Coming" was described as a "dramatic" hip hop and R&B song. "UUU" is evocative of a Europop-dance style.

== Release and promotion ==
The release of They Are Coming was first announced on September 30, 2011. A music video teaser for the song "They Are Coming" was released on October 6. The mini-album and the music video for the title track were simultaneously released on October 10.

On October 13, Wheesung began promoting "They Are Coming" by performing the song on weekly music chart shows. Prior to his first performance on Mnet's M Countdown, he began to suffer from "severe abdominal pain", vertigo, a common cold, and fatigue. Although he performed "UUU" live, he was required to lip sync the title track. After being diagnosed with gastritis and enteritis, Wheesung continued to perform the lead single the following day on KBS2's Music Bank in spite of a doctor's advisory to rest. He also performed the song on MBC TV's program Beautiful Concert.

== Critical reception ==
Writing for online magazine IZM, Park Bom rated They Are Coming three and a half stars out of five. She lauded "Music" and described it as a song which "expresses self-confidence, honesty, and aspiration, which compiles the emotions of music". Rating the mini-album three stars out of five, Lee Byeong-ju of Rhythmer understood that They Are Coming served as "commemorative remembrance of Wheesung's enlistment", but expressed doubt in the record's "significance". He chose "Music" as the best song on the mini-album and commended Wheesung's particular autobiographical lyrics throughout the record, but he felt that arrangements and melodies for the remaining songs were "not so impressive and cliché". He also noted that, despite Wheesung's vocal ability, the singer was "too cautious" and his vocal delivery was limited.

== Commercial performance ==
On the chart dated October 9 – 15, 2011, They Are Coming debuted at number nine on the Gaon Album Chart. By the end of the month, the mini-album sold 4,766 copies in South Korea.

== Track listing ==
Track listing
No.	Title	Lyrics	Music	Arrangement	Length
1.	"Music"	Wheesung	Wheesung, Donnie J	Donnie J	3:47
2.	"They Are Coming" (놈들이 온다; Nomdeuri onda)	Wheesung	Kim Do-hun	Kim Do-hun	3:34
3.	"UUU"	Wheesung	Lee Woo-min	Kim Do-hun	3:55
4.	"OJ"	Wheesung	Wheesung, Moon Ha	Moon Ha, Doo Lee	2:46
5.	"Oh Lonely"	Wheesung	Wheesung, Moon Ha	Moon Ha, Doo Lee	4:02
Total length:					18:04

== Charts ==
Chart (2011)	Peak position
Gaon Album Chart	9
