= Dangerman (album) =

- Regular Edition cover

Studio album by Seven
- Released: December 7, 2016
- Genres: R&B, dance
- Length: 46:51
- Languages: Japanese, Korean
- Label: Victor Entertainment

Seven chronology
I Am Seven (2016)	Dangerman (2016)

Singles from Dangerman
- 1. "Rainbow" Released: July 7, 2016; 2. "Dangerman" Released: December 7, 2016

Dangerman is the second Japanese studio album by South Korean recording artist Seven. It was released on December 7, 2016, under Victor Entertainment. His first studio album in ten years since First Seven (2006), the record is meant to showcase a different perspective of the singer. Dangerman was released in three editions: Regular, Limited, and Premium Editions.

== Background ==
The release of Dangerman was announced on October 5, 2016, with a release date of December 7. It marks the first time in ten years since the release of his previous Japanese studio album First Seven.

== Music structure ==
A R&B and dance record, Seven also incorporates elements of punk into Dangerman. The opening title track is classified as a dance song "with a distinguished dark atmosphere". It is followed by "Feel the Fire", a fast-paced song. "Eternity Love" accentuates a "sexy feeling". Described as a "retro" funk song coupled with acoustic brass, "Give It to Me" was previously included on the mini-album I Am Seven (2016). "Dear You" is sung in Seven's "unique sweet voice". "5-6-7" is an R&B track which was also previously included on I Am Seven.

== Release and promotion ==
Seven released "Rainbow" as the first single from the album on July 7, 2016. It debuted at number eight on the weekly Oricon Singles Chart; the single charted for two weeks and went on to sell over 15,000 copies by the end of its chart run. During the 2016 Seven Fan Meeting 1109 birthday event on November 9, Seven showcased the music video for the title track.

Dangerman was released in three editions: Regular Edition; Limited Edition with bonus DVD content that includes the music video for "Dangerman" and its making; and Premium Edition which includes original goods.

== Commercial performance ==
On the chart dated December 19, 2016, Dangerman went on to debut at number 24 on the weekly Oricon Albums Chart, selling 3,732 copies in its first week. It also ranked at number 34 on the Billboard Japan Hot Albums chart and number 22 on the Top Album Sales chart.

== Track listing ==
All editions
No.	Title	Lyrics	Music	Arrangement	Length
1.	"Dangerman"	Kaoru Kami	Jeff Miyahara, Takashi Fukuda	Miyahara, Fukuda	4:02
2.	"Feel the Fire"	Miyahara	Miyahara, Erik Lidbom	Lidbom	3:45
3.	"Eternity Love"	Miyakei	Daichi, Shikata, Shunsuke Harada	Harada	3:24
4.	"Rainbow"	Yōichirō Takagi	Hayato Tanaka	Tanaka	4:25
5.	"Give It to Me"	Seven, Mafly	The Stereotypes, Seven, Kameron "Kam Parker" Glasper	The Stereotypes	3:14
6.	"Dear You"	Miyakei	Daichi, Harada	Harada	4:04
7.	"Fate"	H.U.B.	Hikari	Hikari	3:38
8.	"5-6-7"	Seven	Seven	Seven, Mads Eg	3:02
9.	"Love Mystery"	Hirai Yuka	Yōji Noi	Harada, Keisuke Koyama	4:57
10.	"I Hate It"	Taka Ruscar	Dele Ladimeji, Jamie Sellers	Sellers	2:58
11.	"One"	Hikari	Hikari	Hikari	4:35
12.	"We Need Is Love"	Tsukasa	Tsukasa, Jun Suyama	Suyama	4:47
Total length:					46:51

Regular and Premium Editions
No.	Title	Lyrics	Music	Length
13.	"Better Together" (Live ver.)	Teddy	Teddy	3:49
14.	"Digital Bounce" (Live ver.)	PK, T.O.P	Dee.P	2:33
15.	"Kimi ga Sukida yo" (君が好きだよ; I Like You) (Live Rock ver.)	Takagi	Tanaka	4:16
Total length:				57:29

== Charts ==
Chart (2016)	Peak position
Billboard Japan Hot Albums	34
Billboard Japan Top Albums Sales	22
Oricon Albums Chart	24
