= Hikari (Seven song) =

Single by Seven

from the album First Seven
- Released: February 23, 2005
- Recorded: 2005
- Genre: K-pop
- Length: 3:14
- Label: YG
- Songwriter: Kanetsuki Takuya
- Producer: Nagao Dai

Seven singles chronology
"Crazy" (2004)	"Hikari" (2005)	"Style" (2005)

Music video
- "Hikari" on YouTube

"Hikaru" is a song by South Korean recording artist Seven. It was released on February 23, 2005, and served as the singer's debut single in Japan. Commercially, it peaked at number 28 on the Oricon Singles Chart and number 7 on the MIAK International Albums chart.

== Background and release ==
In January 2005, Seven signed an endorsement contract with LG Telecom worth ₩600 million. During the same month, it was reported that his Japanese debut single "Hikari" would be released on February 23, 2005. It was composed by Do As Infinity's Nagao Dai, who had previously worked for artists such as Ayumi Hamasaki. Its lyrics were penned by Kanetsuki Takuya. On February 14, it was announced that Seven would donate all the proceeds earned from the single to help undernourished children in South Korea. Following the release of the song, he signed another endorsement contract with Lotte Confectionary, worth ₩400 million.

== Commercial performance ==
"Hikari" charted moderately in Japan, debuting at number 29 on the Oricon Singles Chart. It sold 7,303 copies in its first week of release. In South Korea, it was the 7th best-selling non-Korean record during the first half of 2005, selling over 21,570 copies according to the MIAK charts.

== Promotion and live performances ==
Seven held an autograph session commemorating the release of "Hikari" at Gwanghwamun in Seoul on February 23, with more than 2,000 people in attendance. On February 27, he held a debut showcase titled the "Seven Special Live in Tokyo" at Zepp Tokyo, which attracted 3,000 people.

== Track listing ==
CD single

1. "Hikari" (光) – 3:14
2. "Chiri Hoshi" (塵星) – 3:28
3. "Crazy" – 3:41
4. "Hikari" (光) (Instrumental) – 3:14

== Charts ==
=== Weekly charts ===
Chart (2005)	Peak position
Japan Singles (Oricon)	28

=== Monthly charts ===
Chart (2005)	Peak position
South Korean Int'l Albums (MIAK)	11

== Release history ==
Country	Date	Label	Format
Japan	February 24, 2005	YG Entertainment	CD single
