= Just Listen (Seven album) =

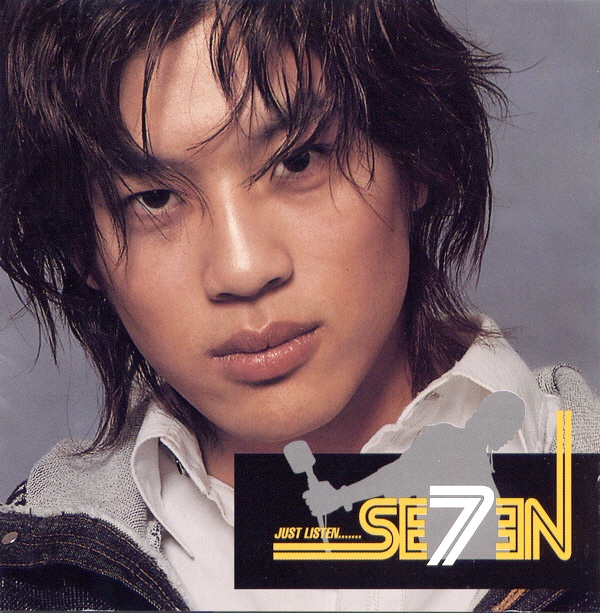

Studio album by Seven
- Released: March 7, 2003
- Recorded: 2002–2003
- Genre: R&B; pop; hip hop
- Length: 50:39
- Language: Korean
- Label: YG Entertainment

Seven chronology
Just Listen (2003)	Must Listen (2004)

Singles from Just Listen
- 1. "Come Back to Me" Released: March 7, 2003; 2. "One More Time" Released: March 7, 2003; 3. "I Just Wanna Be" Released: March 7, 2003; 4. "Baby I Like You Like That" Released: March 7, 2003

Just Listen is the debut studio album by South Korean pop and R&B singer Seven, released on March 7, 2003, under YG Entertainment. It produced four singles: "Come Back to Me", "One More Time", "I Just Wanna Be" and "Baby I Like You Like That". Commercially, the album peaked at number four on the monthly MIAK albums chart for March 2003 and sold over 225,000 copies in South Korea by 2005.

== Commercial performance ==
Just Listen entered the Korean Monthly Album Chart at number 22, with "lukewarm" sales of 13,986 copies However, it started to gain popularity and rose to a peak of number 4 in May 2003, which the album held for two consecutive months The album was the 10th best-selling album on the 2003 year-end chart, with total sales of 212,317 copies.

== Track listing ==
Just Listen track listing
No.	Title	Length
1.	"Intro" (featuring Perry and G-Dragon)	0:36
2.	"I Just Wanna Be"	3:53
3.	"Come Back to Me" (Korean: 와줘; RR: Wajwo)	4:06
4.	"One More Time" (한번 단 한번; Hanbeon Dan Hanbeon)	3:27
5.	"One To Ten"	4:09
6.	"Unwanted Parting" (아쉬운 이별; Aswiun Ibyeol) (featuring Wheesung)	3:57
7.	"Seven (Interlude)"	0:41
8.	"Should I Ever See You" (우연히 널 봐도; Uyeonhi Neol Bwado)	4:43
9.	"Luz Control" (featuring Wheesung and Lexy)	3:49
10.	"Baby I Like You Like That"	3:02
11.	"With These Flowers" (꽃을 들고서; Kkocheul Deulgoseo)	4:46
12.	"Goodbye" (안녕; Annyeong) (with Gummy)	4:14
13.	"Please Go Far Away" (더 멀리 떠나요; Deo Meolli Tteonayo)	5:30
14.	"I Hope It's You" (너이길 바래; Neoigil Barae)	3:40
Total length:		50:39

== Accolades ==
Awards and nominations
Year	Organization	Title	Nominee	Result	Ref.
2003	Golden Disc Awards	Best New Artist	"Come Back to Me"	Won	
2003	Mnet Music Video Festival	Best New Male Artist	"Come Back to Me"	Won	
2003	Mnet Music Video Festival	Best R&B Performance	"One More Time"	Nominated	

Music program awards
Song	Program	Date
"Come Back to Me"	Inkigayo	May 4, 2003
"Come Back to Me"	Inkigayo	May 11, 2003
"Come Back to Me"	Music Camp	May 10, 2003
"Come Back to Me"	Music Camp	May 17, 2003
"Come Back to Me"	Music Camp	May 24, 2003
"Come Back to Me"	Music Camp	May 31, 2003
"Come Back to Me"	Music Camp	June 7, 2003

== Charts ==
=== Monthly charts ===
Chart (2003)	Peak position
South Korean Albums (RIAK)	4

=== Year-end charts ===
Chart (2003)	Position
South Korean Albums (RIAK)	10
