= Channel V Thailand =

Thai music television channel

Channel [V] Thailand
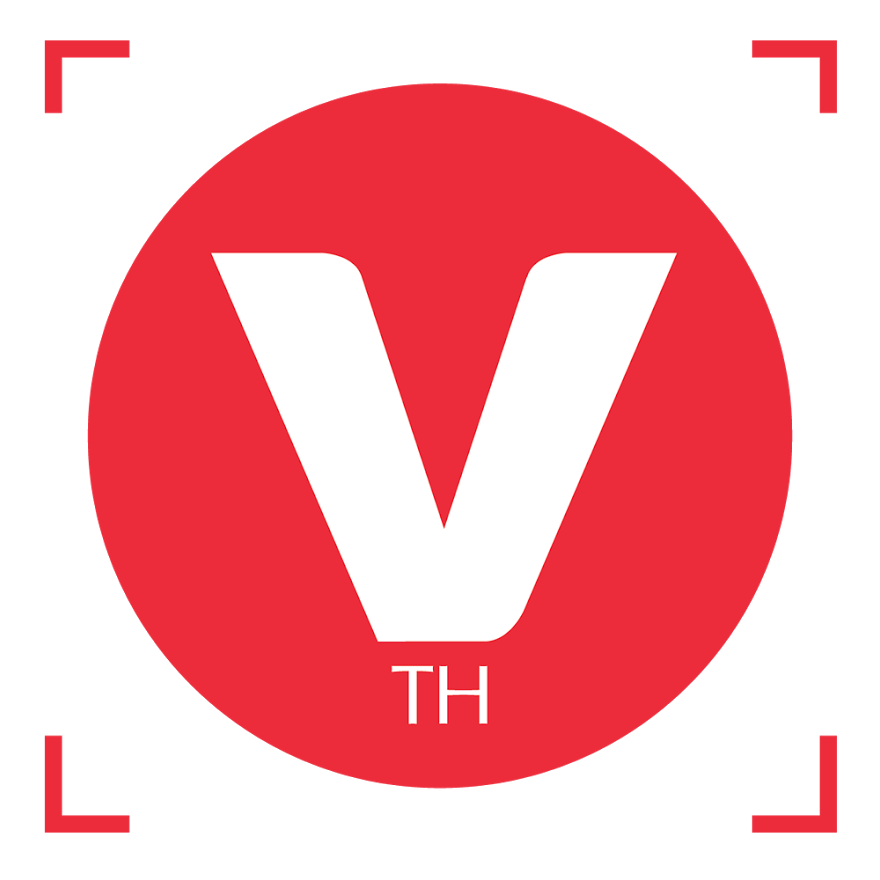
- Country: Thailand
- Broadcast area: Thailand
- Headquarters: [V] Spot; Siam Discovery 6th Floor, Bangkok, Thailand

Programming
- Language: Thai
- Picture format: 576i 4:3 (SDTV)

Ownership
- Owner: Fox Networks Group Asia Pacific (Walt Disney Direct-to-Consumer and International)

History
- Launched: 4 August 1996; 29 years ago
- Closed: 1 October 2021; 4 years ago

Links
- Website: www.channelvthailand.com

Channel [V] Thailand was a Thai music television channel.

In August 2008, Channel [V] Thailand moved studio and office from Sukhumvit 49/12 to Siam Discovery on 6th floor.

Channel [V] Thailand ended its exclusive broadcasting deal with TrueVision on 31 August 2013, moving over to CTH, and discontinuing all VJ-presented programming.

== History ==
The logo used from 1996 to 2014.

Channel [V] Thailand started in 1996 by joint venture between STAR TV and Broadcasting Network Thailand (BNT). At present, Channel [V] Thailand was joint ventured by STAR TV (49%), TrueVisions (26%) and GMM Media (24%) since 2007.

Channel [V] Thailand was the oldest music channel in Thailand and produced most of its shows locally with the exception of the America's Next Top Model.

== Presenters and VJs ==
=== Final VJs ===
- B Bandit Saokaew
- Boss Chatchavalit Sirisab
- Chai Chartayodom Hiranyasthiti
- Earth San Ittisuknanth
- Emme Amika Boohert
- Helen Prathumrat Berger
- Jenny Genevieve Jane Irwin
- "Janeen" Janeen Lyons
- Loukade Metinee Kingpayome
- Louk-Tarn Supamat Phahulo
- Meaw Autcharra Sinratchar-tarnon
- Nadia Nadia Nimitvanich
- Sunny Sunissa Brown
- Ta-Ngaew Bussaba Mahatthapong
- Team Kosin Piyakittiphaibun
- Terng Pradorn Sirakovit
- Michael Sirachuch Chienthaworn
- Nax Charlie Potjes
  - Alex Bin Alexandre
  - Bank Puttipong Kongsomsaksakul
  - Bas Panupat Sulanlayalak
  - Ake Eakachai Waricharaporn
  - Ja Natthaweeranuch Thongmee
  - Kwan Sirikwan Chinnachot
  - Loukade Jirada Yohara
  - Mike Michael Kenneth Wong
  - Paula Paula Taylor
  - Pitta Pitta na Patalung
  - Woonsen Virithipa Pakdeeprasong

== Shows on Channel [V] Thailand ==
=== Final shows ===
- [V] Boutique
- [V] Countdown (VJ Pitta)
- [V] REDioactive
- [V] Tunes
- Asian Chart (VJ Mike)
- Asian Hero (VJ Mike)
- Club [V]
- Double Shot
- Melosamosorn เมโลสโมสร
- Siam Top 20 (VJ Loukade)
- The Record Shop
- The Ticket (VJ Loukade)
- To Ma Dauy Kan โตมาด้วยกัน (VJ Ja)
- Zog Zag (VJ Loukade, Bank, Pitta)

=== Final Special shows ===
- [V] Covery
- [V] Play & Learn ^{+}
- [V] Tour Free
- [V] Style
- [V] Special
- Channel [V] Thailand Music Video Awards (Live, Special)
- America's Next Top Model, Cycle 11
- [V] Get Physical
- Daisy Does America
- Love Parade (Live)

=== Former shows ===
- Big Breakfast (live) (VJ Bee, VJ Boss)
- Remote Control (live) (VJ Loukade, VJ Boss, VJ Pitta, VJ Ja, VJ Emme)
- [V] Play Zone (live)
- [V] Life Begin (live)
- [V] 100 Rock (VJ Pitta)
- [V] All in Spy (VJ Loukade)
- [V] Countdown [inter] Program from Channel [V] International
- [V] Federventure (VJ Eke, VJ Ja)
- [V] Radioactive (VJ Boss)
- [V] Vital (VJ Chai)
- [V].i.d (VJ Loukade)
- 4 Play
- Eaststree (VJ Pitta)
- Flava
- Hei-Beat (VJ Terng)
- House of Noise (VJ Boss)
- Let [V] Entertain U
- Main Stage
- Night Life
- Popparazzi (VJ Paula)
- Rated Weekend
- Rewind
- Smash Hit
- Soundtrack
- Trendy Taste
- The Interview
- The Rock Show
- Turn On [V]
- VideoScope (VJ Chai)
- [V] 365 Music
- [V] Vote
- Khon Du Pen Yai คนดูเป็นใหญ่
- I Am Siam
- [V] Japan Bravo

== Studio and office ==
In August 2008, channel [V] Thailand moved studio and office from Sukhumvit 49/12 to Siam Discovery shopping mall complex. The new studio name is "[V] Spot".

== Channel [V] Thailand Music Video Awards ==
Edition	Concept	Year	Date	Venue
1st	-	2002	23 May	Bangkok Theater
2nd	-	2003	5 April	Main Hall Thammasat University
3rd	-	2004	25 March	Main Hall Thailand Cultural Centre
4th	The Video City	2005	28 May	Thunder Dome, Mueang Thong Thani
5th	Hall of Fame	2006	16 June	BEC Tero Hall
6th	Thaipradit (Thai made:ไทยประดิษฐ์)	2009	22 August	Royal Paragon Hall, Siam Paragon
7th	Thaipradit (Thai made:ไทยประดิษฐ์)	2011	3 September	Crystal Design Center

== Program highlights ==
=== Of the month ===
- The Chosen One
- Spotlight
- Singled Out
- Asian No. 1 Pop
- The Bird Eyes [V]iew
- Trendy Taste

=== Of the week ===
- Yip Chin Phleng Man (Hot Pick, หยิบชิ้น เพลงมันส์)
- Phleng Khao (New Add, เพลงเข้า)

== Activity ==
- Channel [V] Thailand's Music Video Awards
- Channel [V] Thailand VJ Search Project
- Channel [V] Thailand & ACER Unwire Campus Tour 2007
- Channel [V] Thailand's Grand Opening "[V] Spot" @ Siam Discovery
- Channel [V] Thailand Presents Ibis Idol Contest 2009
- European Union Presents EU Green Dats Concert 2009, Bangkok

== See also ==
- Channel [V]
- STAR TV
- True Visions
- MTV Thailand
