= Must Listen =

Studio album by Seven
- Released: July 13, 2004
- Recorded: 2003–2004
- Genre: K-pop
- Length: 45:45
- Language: Korean
- Label: YG

Seven chronology
Just Listen (2003)	Must Listen (2004)	24/Seven (2006)

Singles from Must Listen
- 1. "Passion" Released: July 13, 2004; 2. "Tattoo" Released: July 13, 2004

Must Listen is the second studio album by South Korean singer Seven. The album features the hit single, "Passion", as well as the follow-up radio single "Tattoo".

== Track listing ==
Must Listen track listing
No.	Title	Length
1.	"Passion" (Korean: 열정; RR: Yeoljeong)	3:21
2.	"Desire" (Korean: 욕심; RR: Yoksim)	3:49
3.	"Honey I Know"	4:03
4.	"2 Nite"	4:07
5.	"Two Steps" (Korean: 두걸음; RR: Du Georeum)	3:31
6.	"Tattoo" (Korean: 문신; RR: Munsin)	4:13
7.	"Se7en's Love"	2:59
8.	"I Just Know"	0:42
9.	"I Know" (Korean: 알아; RR: Ara)	3:59
10.	"Pride" (Korean: 오기; RR: Ogi)	3:50
11.	"Wishy Washy"	3:39
12.	"Christmas With You"	3:25
13.	"Words I Don't Want To Hear" (Korean: 듣고 싶지 않은 말; RR: Deutgo Sipji Aneun Mal)	3:51
14.	"You're My Everything"	3:27
15.	"Real Luv Story"	3:05

== Accolades ==
Awards and nominations
Year	Organization	Title	Nominee	Result	Ref.
2004	Golden Disc Awards	Album Bonsang	Must Listen	Won	
2004	Golden Disc Awards	Album Daesang	Must Listen	Nominated	
2004	Golden Disc Awards	Popularity Award	"Passion"	Won	
2004	MBC Gayo Daejejeon	Top Ten Singer (Bonsang)	"Passion"	Won	
2004	Mnet Km Music Video Festival	Best Male Video	"Passion"	Won	
2004	Mnet Km Music Video Festival	Best Dance Video	"Passion"	Nominated	

Music program awards (7 total)
Song	Program	Date
"Passion"	Inkigayo	August 8, 2004
"Passion"	Inkigayo	August 15, 2004
"Passion"	Inkigayo	August 29, 2004
"Passion"	Music Camp	August 14, 2004
"Passion"	Music Camp	August 21, 2004
"Passion"	M Countdown	August 26, 2004
"Passion"	M Countdown	September 2, 2004
"Passion"	M Countdown	September 9, 2004

== Charts ==
=== Monthly charts ===
Chart (2004)	Peak position
South Korean Albums (MIAK)	1

=== Yearly charts ===
Chart (2004)	Position
South Korean Albums (MIAK)	16
