= The Best Man (EP) =

EP by Wheesung
- Released: May 12, 2014
- Recorded: 2014
- Genre: R&B
- Length: 27:04
- Language: Korean
- Label: YMC Entertainment

Wheesung chronology
They Are Coming (2011)	The Best Man (2014)	Transformation (2016)

Singles from The Best Man
- 1. "Night and Day" Released: May 12, 2014

The Best Man is the third mini-album by South Korean recording artist Wheesung. It was released on May 12, 2014, under YMC Entertainment and distributed by KT Music. The record is the first release following the completion of his military service.

Following a series of photo and video teasers, The Best Man and the lead single "Night and Day" were simultaneously released; the mini-album debuted and peaked at number four on the Gaon Album Chart. Wheesung promoted the record on music chart programs across television networks by performing the single, which earned him one music show win on MBC Music's Show Champion.

== Background ==
Wheesung was subject to conscription in South Korea and enlisted for military service on November 7, 2011. As 2012 came to a close, it was reported that he became subject to an investigation for abusing propofol. The Chuncheon District Prosecutor`s Office denied summoning Wheesung to investigate any substance abuse. Shortly before completing his service, Wheesung was hospitalized after sustaining spinal disc herniation and developing alopecia areata. In midst of his stay, he utilized his mobile phone without permission; he spent three days in military prison for breaching regulations. He completed his service and discharged on August 9, 2013.

== Music structure ==
Musically, The Best Man is an R&B record. It opens with "Best Man", a "rhythmical" track where he sings his desires as a man as opposed to a singer. "I Like the Song" begins with the tune of a "tranquil" piano. "Night and Day" is an R&B and pop song accompanied by an electric guitar. "Lying Beside You" describes the "fluttering" feeling of loving a woman. Previously released two years prior, "A Masterpiece Called You" was remastered for inclusion on the mini-album; Wheesung creates a "romantic atmosphere" and utilizes a figure of speech to describe the "masterpiece" of loving a person. A breakup song, "I Don't Want to Know" details the feeling of loneliness. "I Need to Make Money" is a slow-tempo track where Wheesung reveals his concern of earning profit as a musician.

== Release and promotion ==
On March 31, 2014, it was revealed that Wheesung was scheduled to release a mini-album in May. The release date announced was May 12, two years and five months since They Are Coming (2011). It was unclear if Wheesung would pursue a promotional cycle for The Best Man in light of the sinking of MV Sewol the previous month.

A "night version" photo teaser for The Best Man was revealed on May 8. A "day version" was posted on the following day. The music video teaser for "Night and Day", which features cameos by Yura of Girl's Day and C.A.P of Teen Top, was uploaded on the next day. The mini-album and the music video for the lead single were simultaneously released on May 12.

Wheesung began promoting "Night and Day" by performing the song on weekly music chart shows upon release. He first performed on MBC Music's Show Champion, the program's first episode to resume regular broadcasting following the Sewol incident. He followed up with a performance on Seoul Broadcasting System's (SBS) Inkigayo. The following week, Wheesung ranked first on Show Champion, which earned the single its first and only music show win. He continued performing the following days on Mnet's M Countdown and Arirang's Simply K-Pop.

== Critical reception ==
Writing for online magazine IZM, Kim Ban-ya rated The Best Man three and a half stars out of five, complimenting "Night and Day" for its "grandeur" and "dramatic" rise in scale. Also rating the mini-album three stars out of five, Oh Lee of Rhythmer felt that Wheesung accomplished to "upgrade" himself, describing the album as a reflection of the singer due to the "personal sensitivity" of the lyrics. Jung Hae-wook of News Tomtato gave the musicality of the record a full five stars, while awarding it three for its appeal and experimentation. He named "I Need to Make Money" the best track on the record aside from the lead single.

== Commercial performance ==
On the chart dated May 11–17, 2014, The Best Man debuted at number four on the Gaon Album Chart. By the end of the month, the mini-album sold 6,102 copies in South Korea.

== Track listing ==
Track listing
No.	Title	Lyrics	Music	Arrangement	Length
1.	"Best Man" (featuring Esna)	Wheesung	Kim Do-hun	Kim Do-hun	3:57
2.	"I Like the Song" (노래가 좋아; Noraega Joha)	Wheesung	Crazy Melody	Crazy Melody	4:03
3.	"Night and Day"	Wheesung	Kim Do-hun, Lee Sang-ho	Lee Sang-ho	3:40
4.	"Lying Beside You" (네 옆에 누워; Ne Yeope Nuwo)	Wheesung	Moon Ji-yeong	Moon Ji-yeong	3:57
5.	"A Masterpiece Called You" (너라는 명작; Neoraneun Myeongjak) (2014 Remastered Ver.)	Wheesung	Kim Do-hun	Kim Do-hun	3:49
6.	"I Don't Want to Know" (모르고 싶다; Moreugo Shipta)	Wheesung	Crazy Melody, KZ, Jeon Da-woon	Crazy Melody, KZ, Jeon Da-woon	4:12
7.	"I Need to Make Money" (돈 벌어야 돼; Don Beoreoya Dwae)	Wheesung	Wheesung, Moon Ha	Moon Ha	3:26
Total length:					27:04

== Charts ==
Chart (2011)	Peak position
Gaon Album Chart	4
