= Channel V Thailand Music Video Awards =

Music video awards show

Channel [V] Thailand Music Video Awards
- Current: Channel V Thailand Music Video Awards 2009: Thaipradit
- Awarded for: Popular artist, music video and best director
- Country: Thailand
- Presented by: Channel [V] Thailand
- First award: 2002
- Website: http://www.channelvthailand.com/

The Channel [V] Thailand Music Video Awards established in 2002 by Channel [V] Thailand. The awards gives recognition and awards to Thai, International artist and Thai Music Video director.

== Concept, venue ==
Edition	Concept	Year	Date	Venue
1st	–	2002	23 May	Bangkok Theater
2nd	–	2003	5 April	Main Hall Thammasat University
3rd	–	2004	25 March	Main Hall Thailand Cultural Centre
4th	The Video City	2005	28 May	Thunder Dome, Mueang Thong Thani
5th	Hall of Fame	2006	16 June	BEC-TERO Hall
6th	Thaipradit (Thai made:ไทยประดิษฐ์)	2009	22 August	Royal Paragon Hall, Siam Paragon

== Award categories ==
=== Popular Awards ===
Choice by Viewers' vote

==== Thai ====
- Popular Music Video
- Popular Male Artist
- Popular Female Artist
- Popular Duo or Group Artist
- Popular New Artist
- Popular Music production DJ Mad

==== International ====
- Popular Music Video
- Popular Artist
- Popular New Artist
- Popular Asian Artist

=== Best Awards ===
Decision by committee.

- Best Music Video
- Best Director
- Best Editing
- Best Cinematography
- Best Visual Effects
- Best Art Direction

== See also ==
- Channel V
- Channel [V] Thailand
- Star TV
- True Visions
