= Seven (South Korean singer) =

South Korean singer (born 1984)

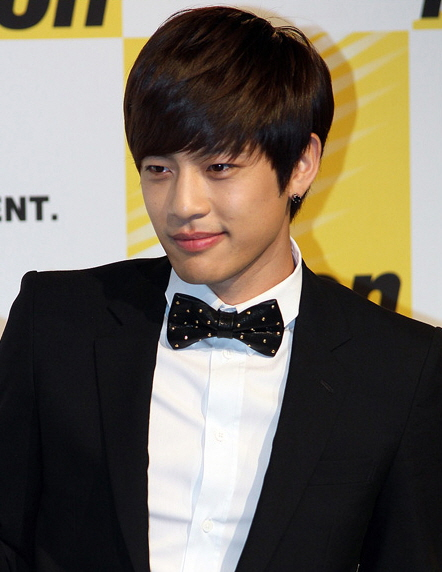
- Seven at Nikon & YG A Shot A Day Campaign, Grand Hyatt Hotel, Yongsan-gu, Seoul, on March 8, 2011

Background information
- Born: Choi Dong-wook; November 9, 1984 (age 41); Seoul, South Korea
- Genres: K-pop, R&B, hip hop
- Occupations: Singer; actor
- Years active: 2003–present
- Labels: YG; Avex Group; Ingrooves; Eleven9; Dmost
- Formerly of: YG Family
- Spouse: Lee Da-hae (m. 2023)

- Seven
- Hangul: 최동욱
- RR: Choe Donguk
- MR: Ch'oe Tonguk

Choi Dong-wook (Korean: 최동욱; born November 9, 1984), better known by his stage name Seven (Korean: 세븐; stylized as Se7en), is a South Korean singer. He made his debut in 2003 with the studio album Just Listen, which sold over 210,000 copies by the end of the year and spawned the hit single "Come Back to Me". Its success led Seven to win the Best New Artist awards at various year-end award ceremonies in South Korea, including at the SBS Gayo Daejeon, MBC Gayo Daejejeon, Mnet Music Video Festival and Golden Disc Awards.

Seven's sophomore album, Must Listen (2004), also saw success and produced the hit single "Passion". It received various awards including Best Male Video at the 2004 MKMF and the Popularity Award at the Golden Disc Awards. In 2005, Seven expanded into the Japanese market with the release of his Japanese debut single "Hikari". His follow-up Japanese singles, "Style" (2005), "Start Line / Forever" (2005), and "I Wanna..." (2006), reached the top ten on the Oricon Singles Chart.

Seven's third Korean studio album, 24/Seven, and first Japanese studio album, First Seven, were both released on March 8, 2006. In 2009, he recorded his first English-language single titled "Girls" with Lil' Kim. His next Korean singles, "Better Together" (2010) and "When I Can't Sing" (2012), reached the top five on the Gaon Digital Chart in South Korea.

== Career ==
=== 2003–2004: Debut with Just Listen, best new artist awards, and Must Listen ===
Seven began training under the management agency YG Entertainment at the age of fifteen. After four years of training in singing and dancing, he made his debut in 2003 with the album Just Listen, released on March 8. Later that year, he received best new artist awards at the Golden Disc Awards, MBC Gayo Daejejeon, Mnet Music Video Festival, SBS Gayo Daejeon, and Seoul Music Awards.

On July 7, 2004, Seven released his second album, Must Listen, which he described as being more grown-up than his debut album. Must Listen peaked at number one on the monthly Recording Industry Association of Korea album chart. The album's lead single, "Passion", won Best Male Video at the Mnet Km Music Video Festival, as well as bonsang awards at the Golden Disc Awards and MBC Gayo Daejejeon.

=== 2005–2006: Expansion in Asia, 24/Se7en and Se7olution ===
In April 2005, Seven continued promotions for Must Listen in Thailand, where the album sold over 100,000 copies and the singles "Passion" and "Tattoo" topped the Channel V weekly charts. Later that month, he won the award for Popular Asian Artist at the Channel V Thailand Music Video Awards.

On January 9, 2006, Seven released his first Chinese album, Must Listen (不得不聽), in China, Hong Kong, Taiwan, Malaysia and Singapore. The album includes all of the songs from his 2004 Korean album of the same name, as well as two new songs in Chinese. He went on to win three awards at the China Original Music Pop Chart Awards held that summer, helping to establish his reputation as a "Hallyu star".

On March 8, Seven released his third Korean studio album, 24/Se7en (which includes the lead single "I Know"), as well as his first Japanese studio album, First Se7en. 24/Se7en charted at number one on Hanteo's daily album chart in South Korea, while First Se7en debuted at number eight on Oricon's daily album chart in Japan. He released his fourth Korean studio album, Se7olution, on November 1.

=== 2007–2010: Acting debut and U.S. promotions ===
Seven made his acting debut in January 2007 as the lead of the TV drama Prince Hours, a spin-off of the 2006 hit series Princess Hours. While viewership ratings for the show were low, Seven said in an interview after the show concluded, "The word 'failure' is used to describe Prince Hours, but, to me, it is a great success that's so precious".

In April 2007, it was reported that Seven's debut English-language single had been leaked on YouTube. The song, titled "This Is My Year", featured rapper Fabolous and was not intended to be released until later that year. As a result of the leak, YG Entertainment announced that it would revise plans for Seven's U.S. debut.

On March 14, 2008, Seven held a preview party in New York City for his upcoming U.S. debut. He played three new songs, which featured collaborations with producer Rodney "Darkchild" Jerkins and hip-hop group Three 6 Mafia. He continued promotions in Los Angeles in May, when he announced that he had finished recording 12 songs for his planned U.S. album. On March 10, 2009, Seven released his first English-language single, "Girls," a pop-R&B song that features American rapper Lil' Kim. In June, Seven became the first Asian artist to have his music video played on the U.S. television channel BET, when "Girls" was broadcast on the music video show 106 & Park. Seven's full English-language album was ultimately not released.

=== 2010: Korean comeback ===
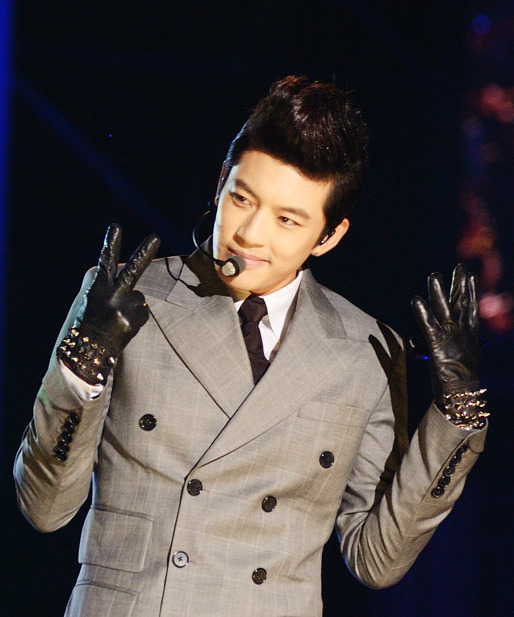
Se7en in October 2011

Seven made an official comeback in Korea after a three-year-long hiatus on July 31, 2010 with his first mini-album "Digital Bounce." The album consisted of six songs, including a song from his American debut titled 'Money Can't Buy Me Love'. His 2nd track 'Digital Bounce' featured the rapping skills of BigBang's TOP. Seven began his follow up promotions in October with the song 'I'm Going Crazy' which featured his longtime girlfriend Park Han-byul as the main actress in the music video. Throughout his comeback, Seven attended many variety shows and even featured in fellow labelmate 2NE1's hit reality show 2NE1TV, where he described his hardships in America and his hiatus. Seven ended his promotions on October 30, 2010.

=== 2011: Japanese comeback ===
Seven has recently revealed, by means of 2NE1's Nolza Japan Concert, that he is planning a comeback in Japan after his four-year hiatus since 2007. He has revealed that this album will have a Pop concept and that his first official fanmeet would be on November 6, 2011. Seven has also revealed that he will be releasing a digital single called 'Angel' in November 2011, and would release a full Japanese album alongside a Korean album in January 2012.

Seven released his 2nd mini-album on February 1, 2012 with title track "When I Can't Sing." The track was produced by JYP and written by JYP, making it the first ever official collaboration between YG Entertainment and JYP Entertainment.

=== 2013–2015: Military service and discharge ===
On March 18, 2013, Seven enlisted for his mandatory military service at the 306 Reserve in Uijeongbu, Gyeonggi Province for five weeks of basic training followed by 21 months as an active-duty soldier. On that same day, YG Entertainment released Seven's music video "THANK U (고마워)". Seven was discharged from his mandatory military service on December 28, 2014. During his military service, the singer's contract with YG Entertainment expired in February 2015. It was later confirmed that they mutually agreed not to renew the singer's contract.

=== 2016: Return to music, I Am Seven ===
On July 6, he released "I'm Good", his first song since leaving YG Entertainment. On October 14, he released the mini-album I Am Seven (stylized I Am Se7en), his first album in over four years, along with the lead single, "Give It to Me", and its music video. After staying out of the public eye for four years, Seven announced he would return to promote in Korea after signing a new contract with Dmost Entertainment on April 17, 2020.

== Artistry ==
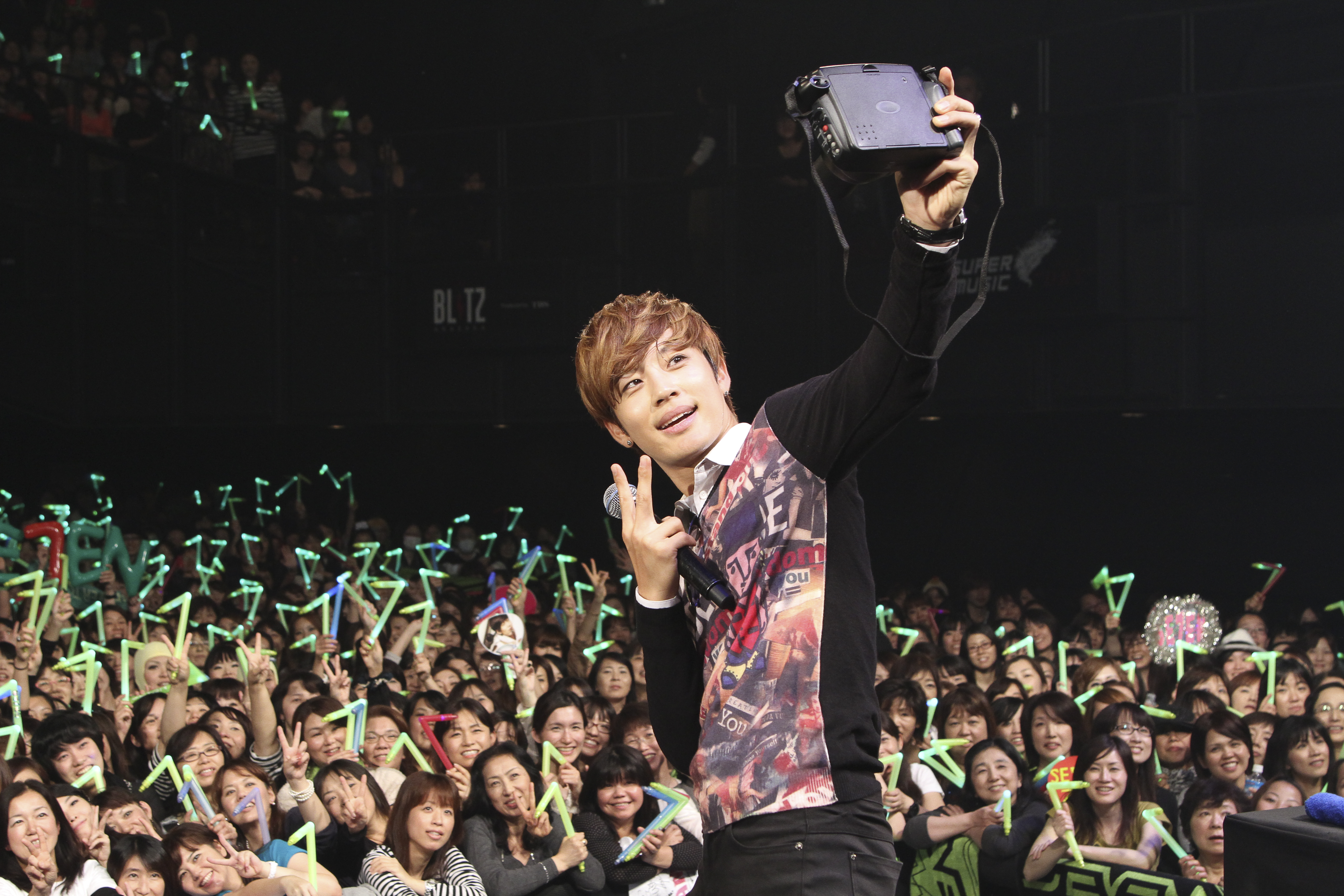
Seven at a fanmeeting in Japan in 2011

=== Voice ===
Seven's vocal range can be classified in the tenor range. His voice can be described as smooth, mellow, and sometimes mildly abrasive (see vocal belting) when songs, such as "Crazy", "La La La", "Hikari" and "I Know", call for it. He often sings with a vibrato in his voice that American R&B singers are known for, and also incorporates beatboxing into many of his songs such as "Passion". Se7en maintains an adamant belief that he should not lipsync during his live performances.

== Personal life ==
=== Relationship and marriage ===
In September 2016, news outlet Sports Chosen reported that Seven and actress Lee Da-hae had been dating for over a year. On March 20, 2023, Seven announced their engagement on her social media accounts. They married in a private ceremony on May 6, 2023, at Hotel Shilla in Seoul. In May 2026, three years after their marriage, the couple announced that they were expecting their first child, with the birth expected in December 2026.

=== Military discipline case ===
In July 2013, Seven, alongside singer Sangchu of Mighty Mouth, was found guilty of visiting a massage parlor that provides sexual services while he was on military leave to perform at a concert that June. While South Korea’s Ministry of National Defense concluded that Seven and Sangchu did not seek illegal services at the massage parlors, it sentenced them to 10 days in military jail for violating military regulations. According to Seven, who spoke about the incident in 2016, he was only charged with leaving the military camp without permission.

== Discography ==
=== Korean albums ===
- Just Listen (2003)
- Must Listen (2004)
- 24/Seven (2006)
- Sevolution (2006)

=== Chinese albums ===
- Must Listen (2006)

=== Japanese albums ===
- First Seven (2006)
- Dangerman (2016)
- 1109 (2017)

== Tours ==
- 'First Se7en' Japan Yoyogi Concert (2006)
- 747 Live Concert (2007)
- 'Are U ready?' Japan Tour Concert (2007)
- Se7en 10th Anniversary Talk Concert – Thank U (2013)

== Filmography ==
=== Television series ===
Year	Title	Role	Notes	Ref.
2007	Prince Hours	Kang Hoo/Lee Hoo		

=== Television shows ===
Year	Title	Role	Ref.
2023	Golf Match Swing Star	Contestant	

=== Web shows ===
Year	Title	Role	Ref.
2021	Seven Golf Courses	Host	

== Theatre ==
Year	Title	Korean Title	Role	Ref.
2021	I Loved You	사랑했어요	Yoon Gi-cheol	
2022	Volume Up	볼륨업	Kim Eun-soo	

== Awards and nominations ==
Name of the award ceremony, year presented, award category, nominee of the award and the result of the nomination
Award ceremony	Year	Category	Nominee / work	Result	Ref.
Asia Artist Awards	2018	Best History of Songs	Seven	Won	
Channel V Thailand Music Video Awards	2005	Popular Asian Artist	Seven	Won	
China Music Award and Asian Influence Awards	2012	Best Overseas Performer	Seven	Won	
China Original Music Pop Chart Awards	2006	Asia Best Music Artist	Seven	Won	
Golden Disc Awards	2003	Best New Artist	"Come Back to Me"	Won	
Golden Disc Awards	2004	Main Prize (Bonsang)	"Passion"	Won	
Golden Disc Awards	2004	Popularity Award	"Passion"	Won	
Japan Gold Disc Awards	2006	Japan-Korea Friendship Award	Seven	Won	
KBS Music Awards	2004	Singer of the Year (Bonsang)	Seven	Won	
KMTV Korean Music Awards	2003	Best New Male Artist	Seven	Won	
MBC Entertainment Awards	2003	Special Award in Singing	Seven	Won	
MBC Gayo Daejejeon	2003	Best New Artist	Seven	Won	
MBC Gayo Daejejeon	2004	Top Ten Singer (Bonsang)	"Passion"	Won	
Mnet 20's Choice Awards	2007	Best Male Artist	Seven	Won	
Mnet Asian Music Awards	2003	Best New Male Artist	"Come Back to Me"	Won	
Mnet Asian Music Awards	2003	Best R&B Performance	"Once Again"	Nominated	
Mnet Asian Music Awards	2004	Best Male Video	"Passion"	Won	
Mnet Asian Music Awards	2004	Best Dance Video	"Passion"	Nominated	
Mnet Asian Music Awards	2006	Best Male Artist	"I Know"	Nominated	
Mnet Asian Music Awards	2010	Best Male Solo Artist	"Better Together"	Nominated	
MTV Asia Awards	2006	Favorite Korean Artist	Seven	Won	
MTV Video Music Awards Japan	2006	Best Buzz Asia Award	"Start Line"	Won	
SBS Gayo Daejeon	2003	Best New Artist	Seven	Won	
SBS Gayo Daejeon	2006	Bonsang	Seven	Won	
Seoul Music Awards	2003	Best New Artist	Seven	Won	
Singapore Entertainment Awards	2011	Best Asian Performance	Seven	Won	
