= Potsdamer Platz =

Public square and traffic intersection in Berlin, Germany

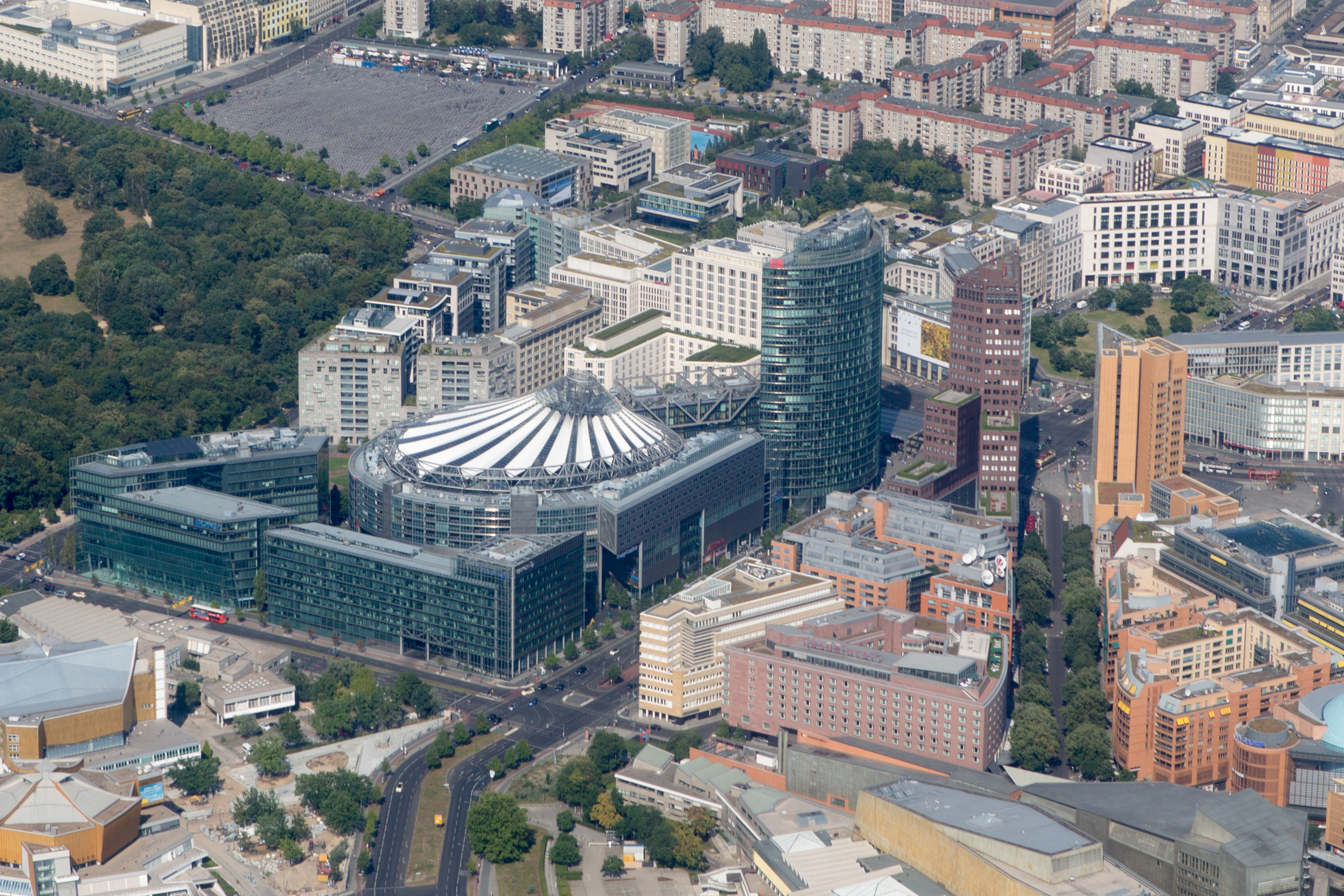
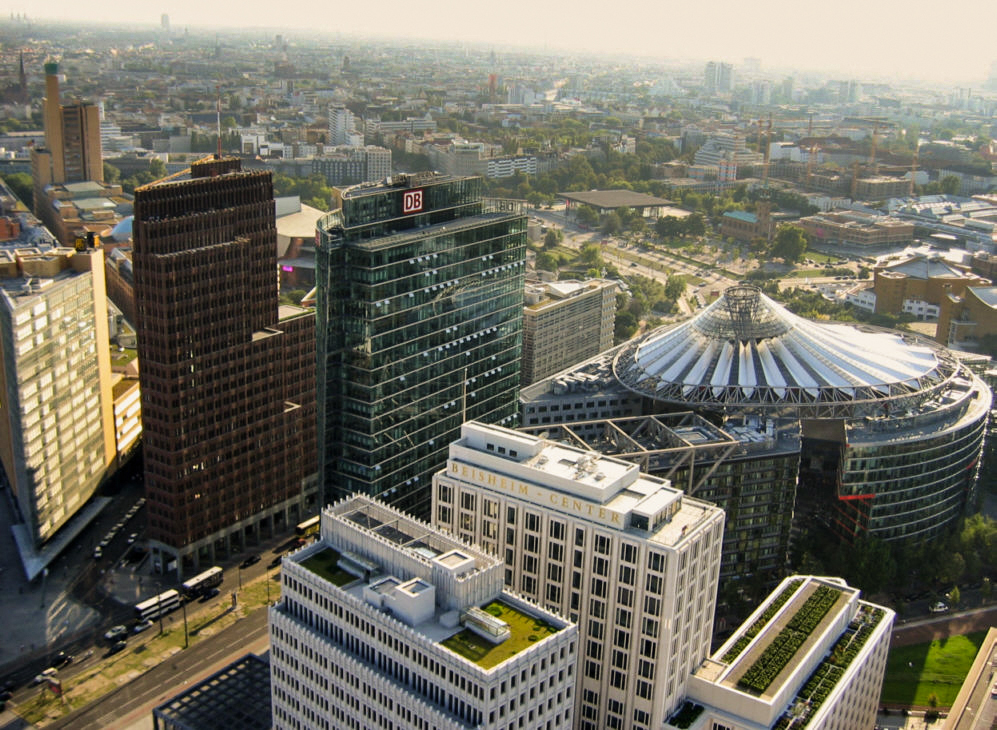
- Potsdamer Platz in 2016 Potsdamer Platz in 2004
- Interactive map of Potsdamer Platz
- Former names: Platz vor dem Potsdamer Thor; (after 1735–1831)
- Part of: Bundesstraße 1
- Namesake: Potsdam Gate
- Type: Public square
- Location: Berlin, Germany
- Quarter: Tiergarten, Mitte
- Nearest metro station: Potsdamer Platz
- Coordinates: 52°30′32″N 13°22′35″E
- Major junctions: Ebertstraße; Auguste-Hauschner-Straße; Bellevuestraße; Potsdamer Straße; Alte Potsdamer Straße; Linkstraße; Gabriele-Tergit-Promenade; Stresemannstraße; Erna-Berger-Straße; Leipziger Platz; Leipziger Straße

Construction
- Construction start: By early 19th century
- Inauguration: 8 July 1831

Potsdamer Platz (German: [ˈpɔtsdamɐ plats], Potsdam Square) is a public square and traffic intersection in the centre of Berlin, Germany, lying about 1 km (1,100 yd) south of the Brandenburg Gate and the Reichstag (German Parliament Building), and close to the southeast corner of the Tiergarten park. It is named after the city of Potsdam, some 25 km (16 mi) to the south west, and marks the point where the old road from Potsdam passed through the city wall of Berlin at the Potsdam Gate. Initially, the open area near the city gate was used for military drills and parades. In the 19th into the 20th century, it developed from an intersection of suburban thoroughfares into the most bustling traffic intersection in Europe. The area was totally destroyed during World War II and then left desolate during the Cold War era when the Berlin Wall bisected it. Following German reunification in 1990, Potsdamer Platz underwent extensive redevelopment throughout the 1990s and early 2000s. Today, it is a bustling commercial and cultural hub featuring corporate offices, retail spaces, restaurants, cinemas, and hotels.

== Historical background ==
The history of Potsdamer Platz can be traced to 29 October 1685, when the Tolerance Edict of Potsdam was signed, whereby Frederick William, Elector of Brandenburg-Prussia from 1640 to 1688, allowed large numbers of religious refugees, including Jews from Austria and Huguenots expelled from France, to settle on his territory to repopulate it following the Thirty Years' War (1618–48). Several new districts were founded around the city's perimeter, just outside the old fortifications. The largest of these was Friedrichstadt, just south west of the historic core of Berlin, begun in 1688 and named after the new elector, Frederick William III, who became King Frederick I of Prussia. Its street layout followed the Baroque-style grid pattern much favoured at the time, and was based on two main axes: Friedrichstraße running north–south, and Leipziger Strasse running east–west. All the new suburbs were absorbed into Berlin around 1709–10. In 1721-3 a south-westwards expansion of Friedrichstadt was planned under the orders of King Frederick William I, and this was completed in 1732–4 by architect Philipp Gerlach (1679–1748). In this expansion, a new north–south axis emerged: Wilhelmstrasse.

In 1735–1737, after Friedrichstadt's expansion was complete, the Berlin Customs Wall was erected around the city's new perimeter. Potsdamer Platz would eventually develop around the gate at the west end of Leipziger Strasse, which turned south toward the hamlet of Schöneberg after leaving the city. This road, which had developed into part of a trading route running across Europe from Paris to St. Petersburg via Aachen, Berlin and Königsberg, became Elector Frederick William's route of choice to Potsdam, the location of his palace, in 1660. After Frederick II became king in 1740, the road was significantly improved, and became known as Potsdamer Straße; the gate became Potsdamer Tor (Potsdam Gate).

Just inside the gate was a large octagonal area, created at the time of Friedrichstadt's expansion in 1732-4 and bisected by Leipziger Strasse; this was one of several parade grounds for the thousands of soldiers garrisoned in Berlin at the height of the Kingdom of Prussia. Initially known as the Achteck (Octagon), on 15 September 1814 it was renamed Leipziger Platz after the site of Prussia's final decisive defeat of Napoleon Bonaparte at the Battle of Leipzig, which brought to an end the Wars of Liberation that had been going on since 1806. The gate itself was redesignated Leipziger Tor (Leipzig Gate) around the same time, but reverted to its old name a few years later.

Being outside Berlin, and therefore not subject to the same planning guidelines, Potsdamer Platz grew in a piecemeal and haphazard way, unlike Leipziger Platz, which had been planned and built all at once by Johann Philipp Gerlach. Prussian architect Friedrich David Gilly proposed a unified redesign of the two squares in 1797, but it was never built. In 1815, his pupil, Karl Friedrich Schinkel, proposed the area as the location for a National Memorial Cathedral, to be known as the Residenzkirche, but this was never built either, due to lack of funds. However, Schinkel did get to rebuild the gate in 1823–1824, replacing what was little more than a gap in the customs wall with a much grander affair consisting of two matching Doric-style stone gate-houses, like little temples, facing each other across Leipziger Strasse. The one on the north side served as the customs house and excise collection point, while its southern counterpart was a military guardhouse, set up to prevent desertions of Prussian soldiers, which had become a major problem. The new gate was dedicated on 23 August 1824. Schinkel's proposal to add a garden was not implemented, but in 1828 a plan by gardener and landscape architect Peter Joseph Lenné went ahead. He redesigned the Tiergarten, a large wooded park formerly the Royal Hunting Grounds, gave his name to Lennéstraße, a thoroughfare forming part of the southern boundary of the park very close to Potsdamer Platz, and transformed a muddy ditch to the south into one of Berlin's busiest waterways, the Landwehrkanal.

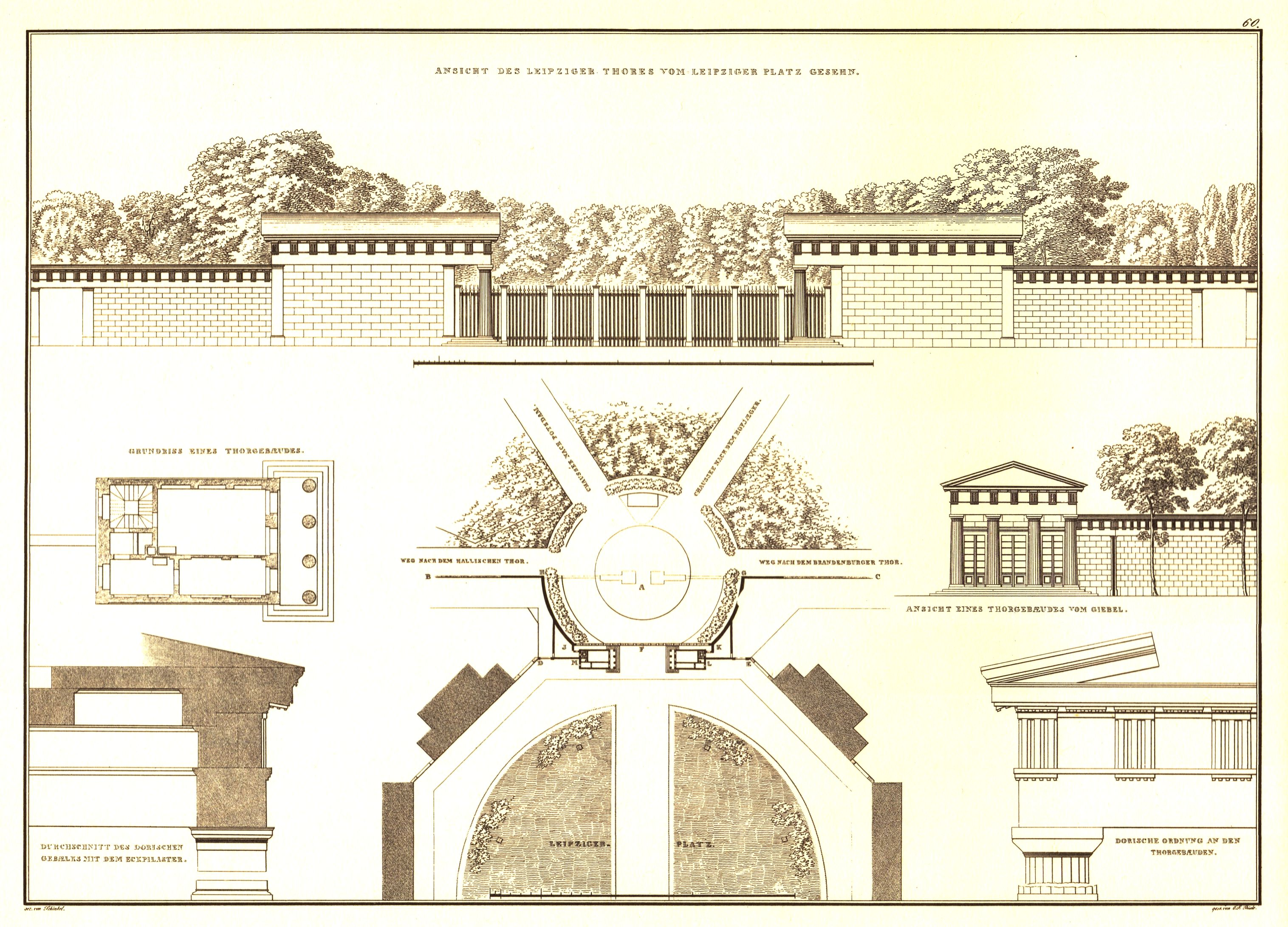
Proposed design by Karl Friedrich Schinkel for Potsdamer Platz and Leipziger Platz

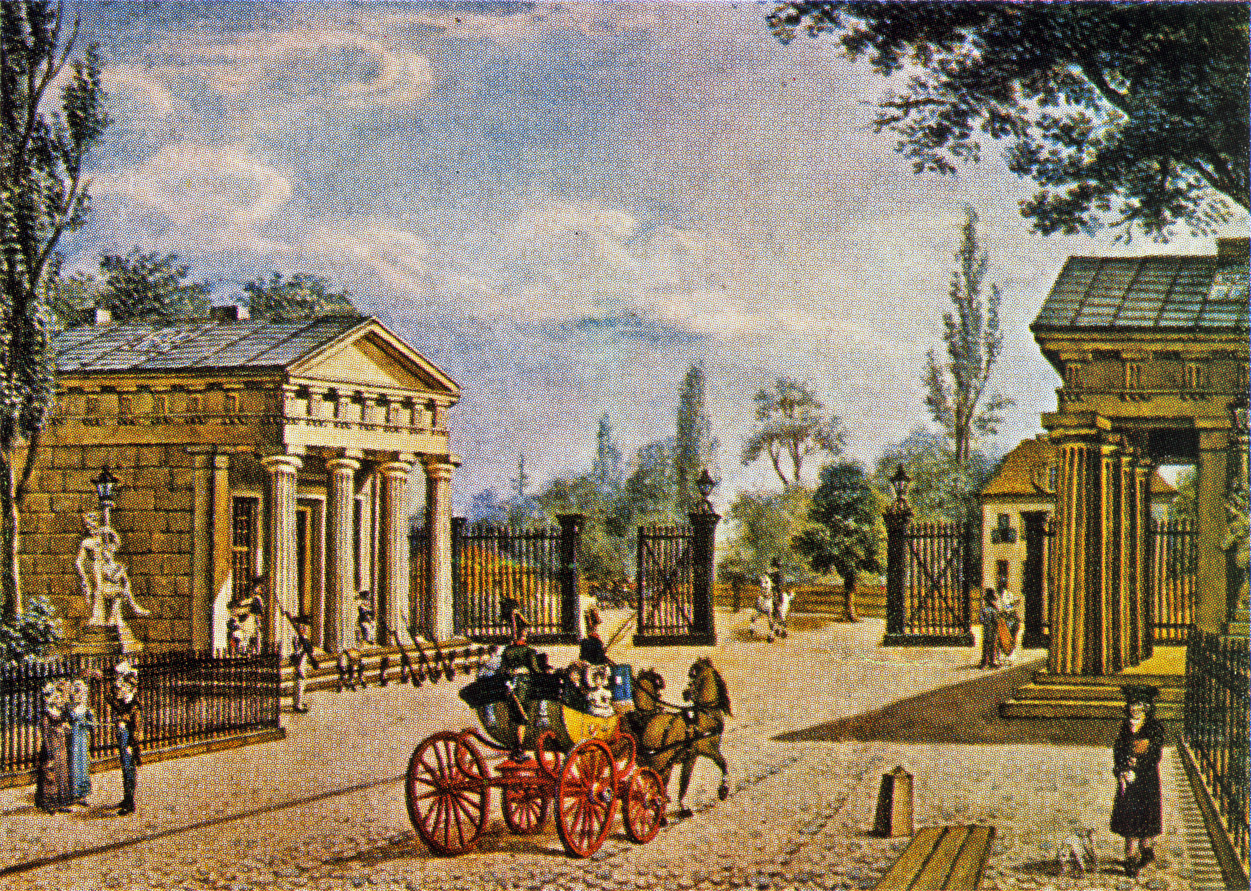
Artist's rendering of the new Potsdam Gate after completion

Meanwhile, country peasantry were generally not welcome in the city, and so the gates also served to restrict access. However, the country folk were permitted to set up trading posts of their own just outside the gates, and the Potsdam Gate especially. It was hoped that this would encourage development of all the country lanes into proper roads; in turn it was hoped that these would emulate Parisian boulevards—broad, straight and magnificent, but the main intention was to enable troops to be moved quickly. Thus Potsdamer Platz was off and running.

It was not called that until 8 July 1831, but the area outside the Potsdam Gate began to develop in the early 19th century as a district of quiet villas, for as Berlin became even more congested, many of its richer citizens moved outside the customs wall and built spacious new homes around the trading post, along the newly developing boulevards, and around the southern edge of the Tiergarten. The development was piecemeal, but in 1828 this area just to the west of Potsdamer Platz, sandwiched between the Tiergarten and the north bank of the future Landwehrkanal, received royal approval for a more purposeful metamorphosis into a residential colony of the affluent, gradually filling with palatial houses and villas. These became the homes of civil servants, officers, bankers, artists and politicians among others, and earned the area the nickname "Millionaires' Quarter" although its official designation was Friedrichvorstadt (Friedrich's Suburb), or the Tiergartenviertel (Tiergarten Quarter).

Many of the properties in the neighbourhood were the work of architect Georg Friedrich Heinrich Hitzig (1811–81), a pupil of Schinkel who also built the original "English Embassy" in Leipziger Platz, where the vast Wertheim department store would stand, although Friedrichvorstadt's focal point and most notable building was the work of another architect—and another pupil of Schinkel. The Matthiaskirche (St. Matthew's Church), built in 1844–6, was an Italian Romanesque-style building in alternating bands of red and yellow brick, and designed by Friedrich August Stüler (1800–65). This church, one of fewer than half a dozen surviving pre-World War II buildings in the entire area, forms the centrepiece of today's Kulturforum (Cultural Forum).

Meanwhile, many of the Huguenots fleeing religious persecution in France, and their descendants, had also been living around the trading post and cultivating local fields. Noticing that traffic queues often built up at the Potsdam Gate due to delays in making the customs checks, these people had begun to offer coffee, bread, cakes and confectionery from their homes or from roadside stalls to travellers passing through, thus beginning the tradition of providing food and drink around the future Potsdamer Platz. Larger and more purpose-built establishments began to take their place, and they in turn were superseded by bigger and grander ones. The former district of quiet villas was by now anything but quiet: Potsdamer Platz had taken on an existence all its own whose sheer pace of life rivalled anything within the city.

By the mid-1860s direct taxation had made the customs wall redundant, and so in 1866–7 most of it was demolished along with all the city gates except two – the Brandenburg Gate and the Potsdam Gate. The removal of the customs wall allowed its former route to be turned into yet another road running through Potsdamer Platz, thus increasing still further the amount of traffic passing through. This road, both north and south of the platz, was named Königgrätzer Straße after the Prussian victory over Austria at the Battle of Königgrätz on 3 July 1866, in the Austro-Prussian War.

== The railways arrive ==
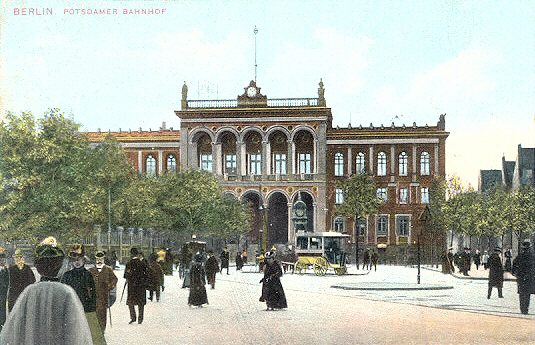
Potsdamer Platz – the Potsdamer Bahnhof around 1900

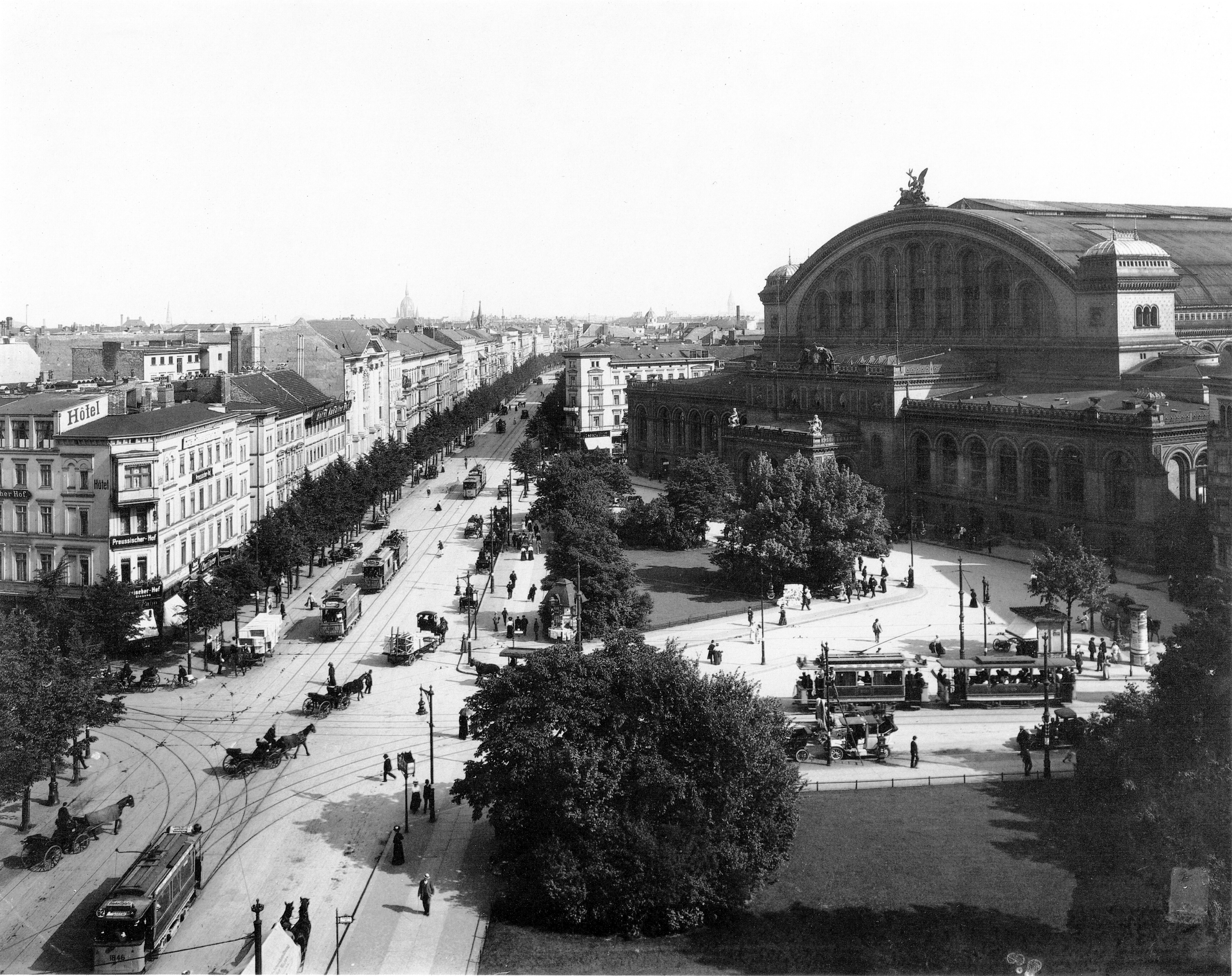
Located a short distance away – the Anhalter Bahnhof around 1900

The railway first came to Berlin in 1838, with the opening of the Potsdamer Bahnhof, terminus of a 26 km line linking the city with Potsdam, opened throughout by 29 October (in 1848 the line would be extended to Magdeburg and beyond). Since the city authorities would not allow the new line to breach the customs wall, still standing at the time, it had to stop just short, at Potsdamer Platz, but it was this that kick-started the real transformation of the area, into the bustling focal point that Potsdamer Platz became.

Three years later a second railway terminus opened. Six hundred metres to the southeast, with a front facade facing Askanischer Platz, the Anhalter Bahnhof was the Berlin terminus of a line running as far as Jüterbog and extended to Dessau, Kothen and beyond.

Both termini began life modestly, but to cope with increasing demand, both went on to much bigger and better things, a new Potsdamer Bahnhof, destined to be Berlin's busiest station, opening on 30 August 1872 and a new Anhalter Bahnhof, destined to be the city's biggest and finest, on 15 June 1880. This latter station benefitted from the closure of a short-lived third terminus in the area – the Dresdner Bahnhof, located south of the Landwehrkanal, which lasted from 17 June 1875 until 15 October 1882.

A railway line once ran through Potsdamer Platz: a connecting line opened in October 1851 and running around the city just inside the customs wall, crossing numerous streets and squares at street level, and whose purpose was to allow goods to be transported between the various Berlin stations, thus creating a hated traffic obstruction that lasted for twenty years. Half a dozen or more times a day, Potsdamer Platz ground to a halt while a train of 60 to 100 wagons trundled through at walking pace preceded by a railway official ringing a bell. The construction of the Ringbahn around the city's perimeter, linked to all the major stations, allowed the connecting line to be scrapped in 1871, although the Ringbahn itself was not complete and open for all traffic until 15 November 1877.

Potsdamer Platz was served by both of Berlin's two local rail systems. The U-Bahn arrived first, from the south; begun on 10 September 1896, it opened on 18 February 1902, with a new and better sited station being provided on 29 September 1907, and the line itself being extended north and east on 1 October 1908. In 1939 the S-Bahn followed, its North-South Link between Unter den Linden and Yorckstraße opening in stages during the year, the Potsdamer Platz S-Bahn station itself opening on 15 April.

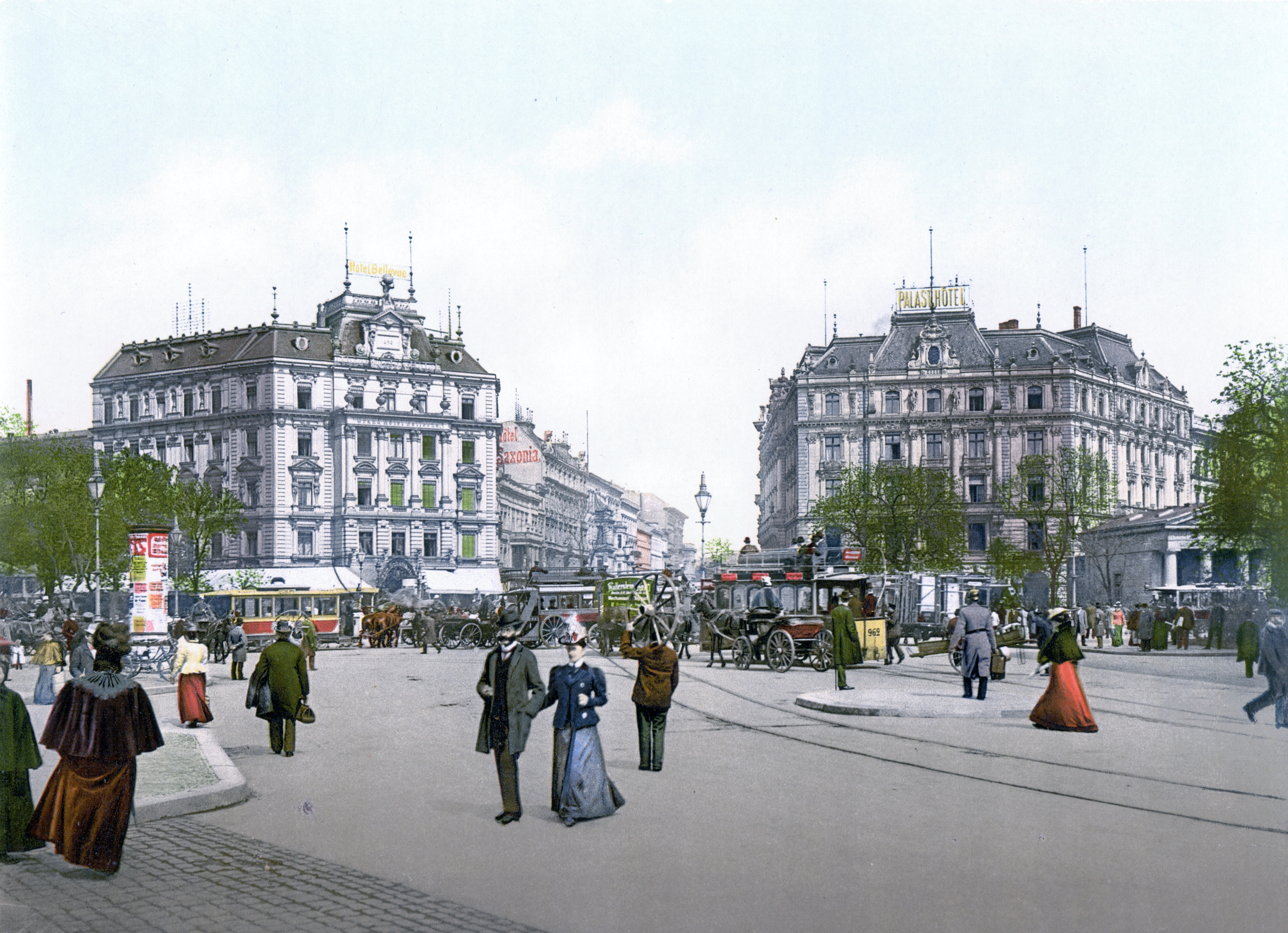
Potsdamer Platz around 1900, looking north. The Grand Hotel Bellevue and Palast Hotel stand on either side of the northern portion of Königgrätzer Strasse (to be renamed Budapester Straße in 1915 and Friedrich Ebertstraße in 1925).

By the second half of the 19th century, Berlin had been growing at a tremendous rate for some time, but its growth accelerated even faster after the city became the capital of the new German Empire on 18 January 1871. Potsdamer Platz and neighbouring Leipziger Platz came into their own afterward. Now firmly in the centre of a metropolis whose population eventually reached 4.4 million, making it the third largest city in the world after London and New York, the area was ready to take on its most celebrated role. Vast hotels and department stores, hundreds of smaller shops, theatres, dance-halls, cafés, restaurants, bars, beer palaces, wine-houses and clubs, all started to appear. Some of these places became internationally known.

Also, a very large government presence, with many German imperial departments, Prussian state authorities and their various sub-departments, came into the area, taking over 26 former palaces and aristocratic mansions in Leipziger Platz, Leipziger Strasse and Wilhelmstraße. Even the Reichstag itself, the German Parliament, occupied the former home of the family of composer Felix Mendelssohn (1809–47) in Leipziger Strasse before moving in 1894 to the vast new edifice near the Brandenburg Gate, erected by Paul Wallot (1841–1912). Next door, the Herrenhaus, or Prussian House of Lords (the Upper House of the Prussian State Parliament), occupied a former porcelain factory for a while, before moving to an impressive new building erected on the site of the former Mendelssohn family home in 1899–1904 by Friedrich Schulze Colditz (1843–1912). This building backed on to an equally grand edifice in the next street (Prinz-Albrecht-Straße), also by Colditz, that had been built for the Preußischer Landtag (the Prussian Lower House), in 1892–9.

Potsdamer Platz was also the location of Germany's first electric street lights, installed in 1882 by the electrical giant Siemens, founded and based in the city.

== Interwar years ==
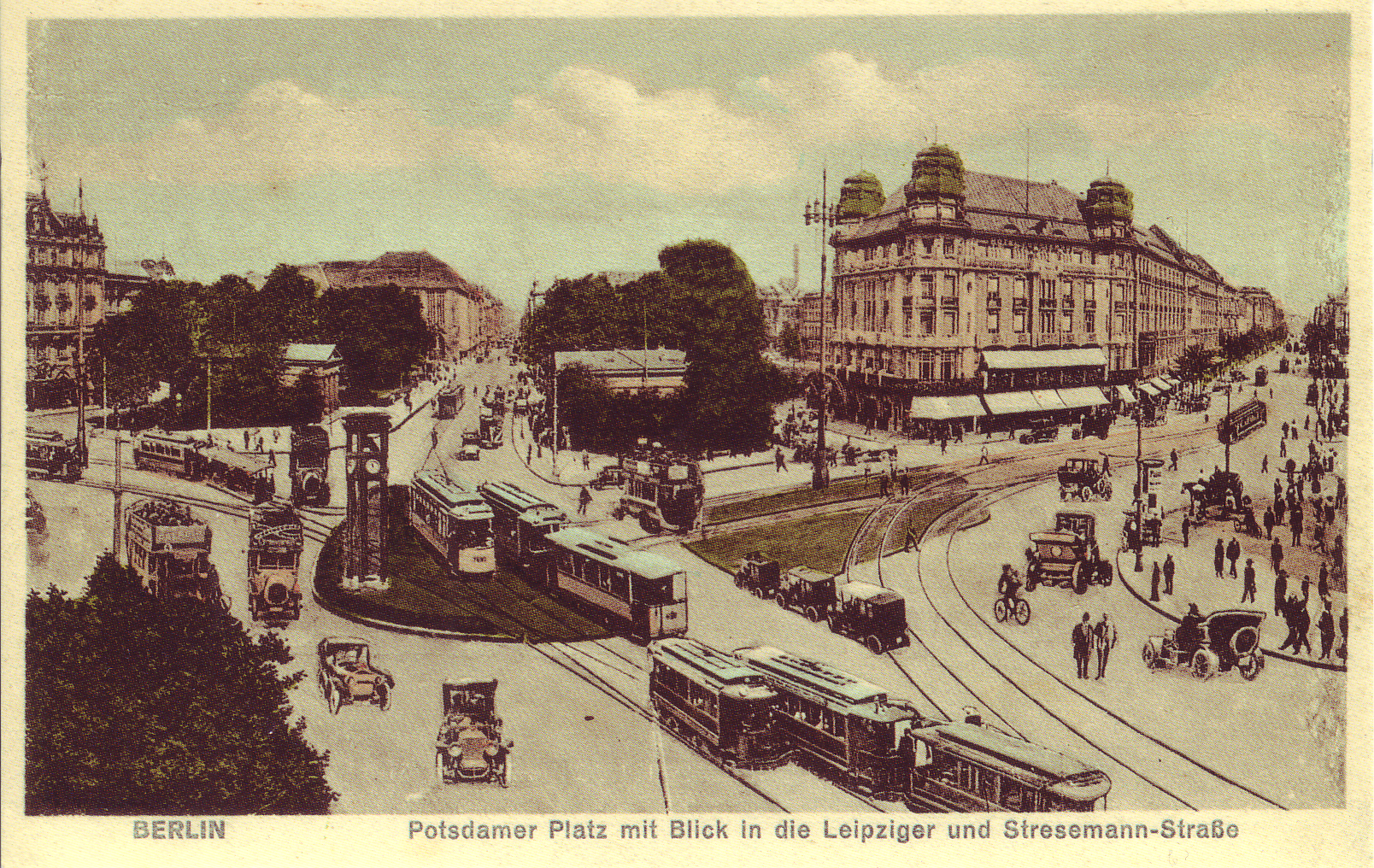
Potsdamer Platz in the mid-1920s, looking east into Leipziger Platz, with the Hotel Fürstenhof on the right. A traffic light tower was erected on the elliptical central island in 1924.

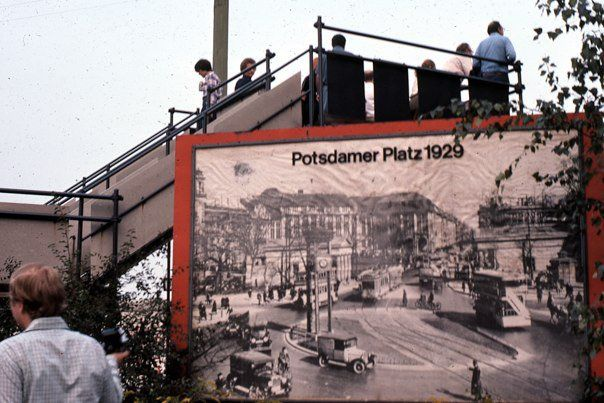
Observation deck in West Berlin with a view of Potsdamer Platz on the other side of the Berlin Wall, 1977. At the bottom of the steps is a placard showing what the square looked like in 1929.

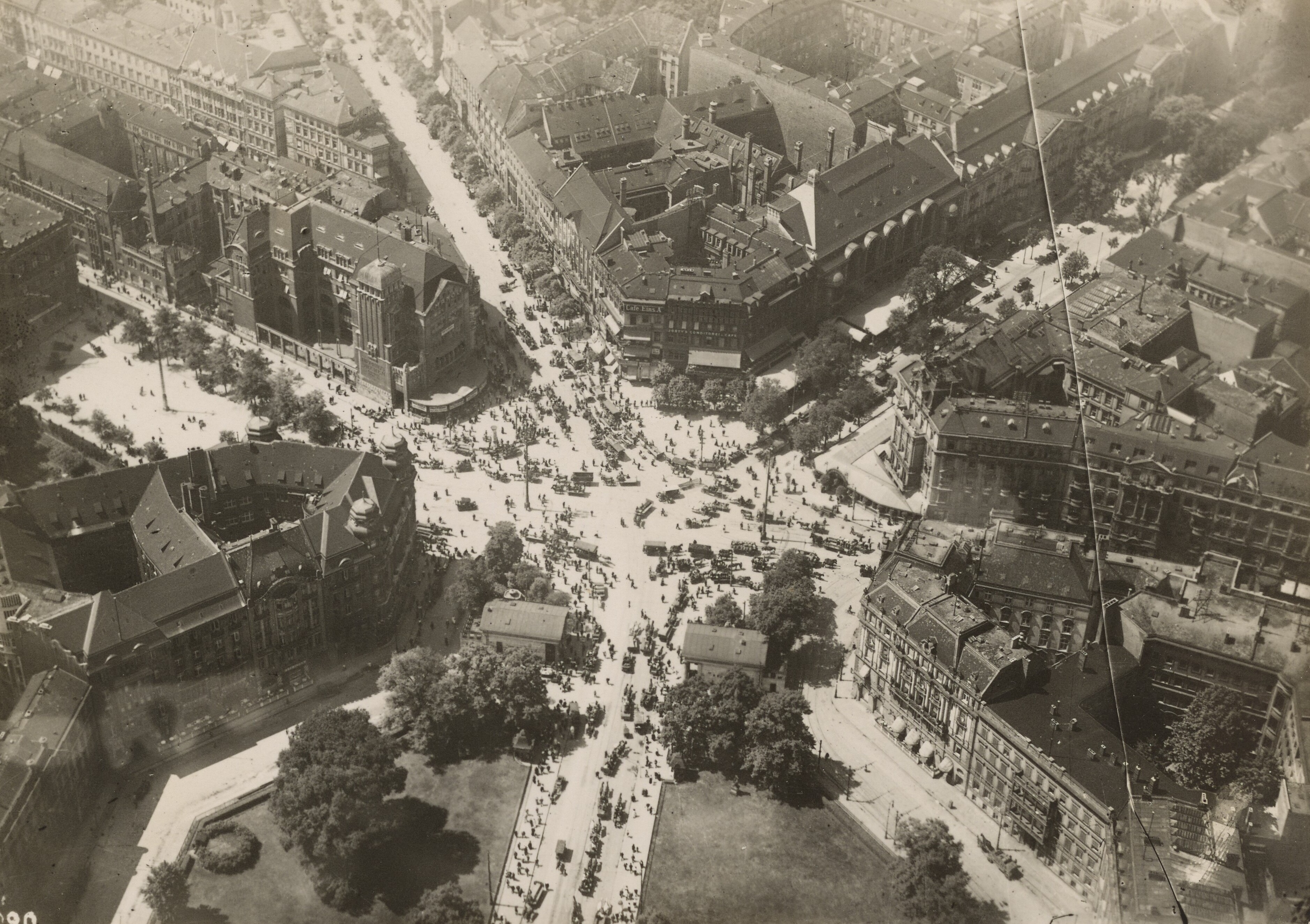
Potsdamer Platz, 1920s

The heyday of Potsdamer Platz was in the 1920s and 1930s. By this time it had developed into the busiest traffic centre in all of Europe, and the heart of Berlin's nightlife. It had acquired an iconic status, on a par with Piccadilly Circus in London or Times Square in New York. It was a key location that helped to symbolize Berlin; it was known worldwide, and a legend grew up around it. It represented the geographical centre of the city, the meeting place of five of its busiest streets in a star-shaped intersection deemed the transport hub of the entire continent. These were:

- Königgrätzer Strasse (northern portion), earlier names Brandenburgische Communication and then Schulgartenstrasse, running along the former route of the customs wall and leading north to the Brandenburg Gate. After a brief spell as Budapester Strasse in the late 1920s (although this name was not widely recognised), on 6 February 1930 it was renamed Ebertstrasse after Friedrich Ebert (1871–1925), first President of Weimar Germany. In 1935 the Nazis renamed it Hermann-Göring-Strasse after Reichsmarshal Hermann Göring, whose official residence was on the east side of the street near the Brandenburg Gate. On 31 July 1947, it reverted to Ebertstrasse.
- Königgrätzer Strasse (southern portion), earlier names Potsdamer Communication and then Hirschelstrasse, also running along part of the customs wall's old route, actually leading mainly south east. On 6 February 1930, it was renamed Stresemannstrasse after Gustav Stresemann (1878–1929), the first Chancellor to serve under President Ebert. In 1935 the Nazis renamed it Saarlandstrasse after the region of southwestern Germany that had been under League of Nations rule since the end of World War I but which on 13 January 1935 elected to return to Germany. On 31 July 1947, it reverted to Stresemannstrasse.
- Leipziger Strasse, leading east.
- Potsdamer Strasse, developed out of that old road to Schöneberg and Potsdam, part of the former trading route across Europe, and leading south west. Today this section is called Alte Potsdamer Strasse, a pedestrianised cul-de-sac severed by post-World War II developments and subsequently by-passed by a new section – the Neue Potsdamer Straße, leading due west and then curving southwards to rejoin its old course at the Potsdam Bridge, over the Landwehrkanal.
- Bellevuestrasse, earlier name Charlottenburger Allee, leading north west through the Tiergarten to Schloss Bellevue, today the official residence of the Federal President of Germany.

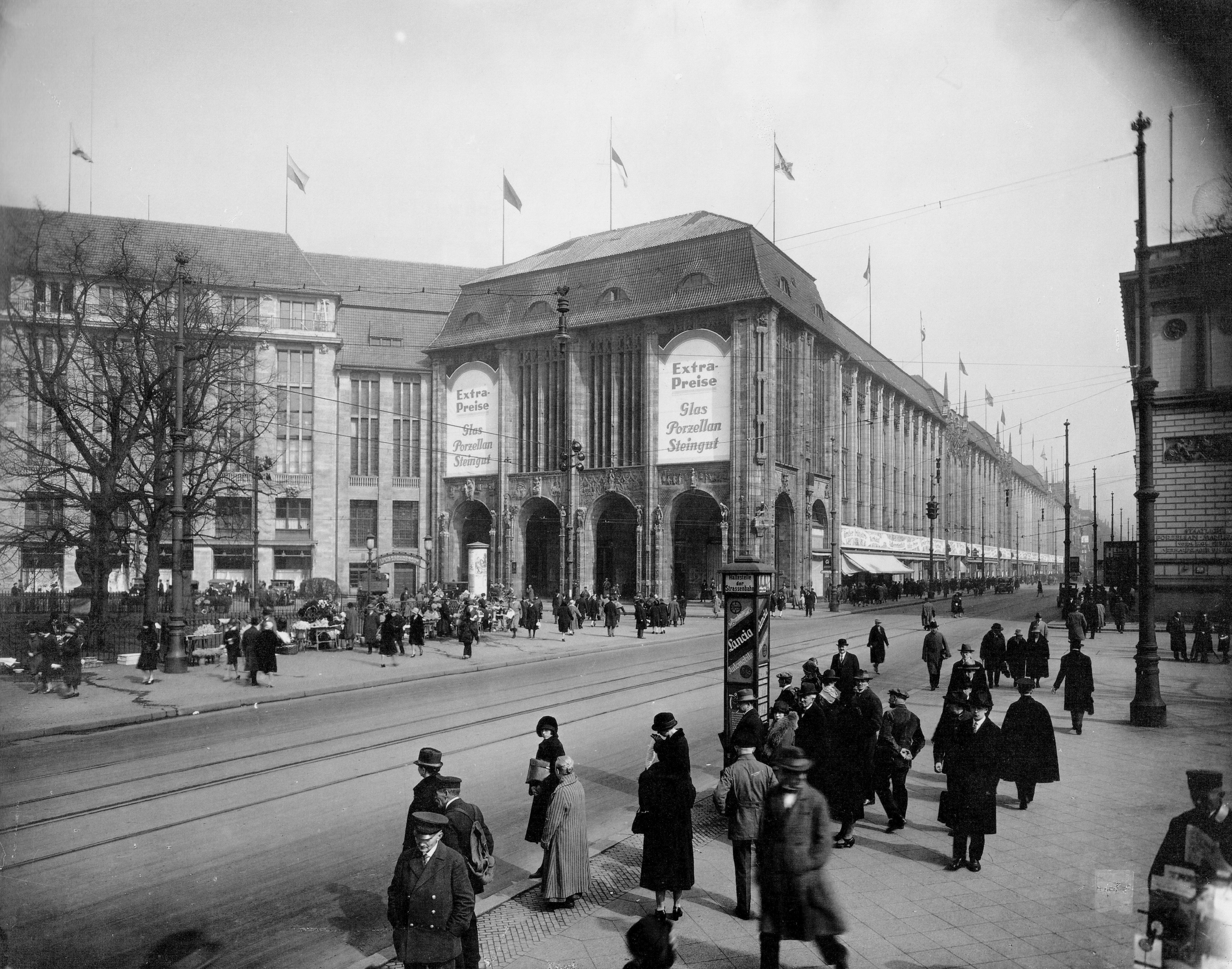
The Wertheim department store in 1927, showing the main facade along Leipziger Strasse

As well as the stations and other facilities and attractions already mentioned, in the immediate area was one of the world's biggest and most luxurious department stores: Wertheim. Founded by German merchant Georg Wertheim (1857–1939), designed by architect Alfred Messel (1853–1909), opened in 1897 and extended several times over the following 40 years, it ultimately possessed a floor area double that of the Reichstag, a 330-metre-long granite and plate glass facade along Leipziger Strasse, 83 elevators, three escalators, 1,000 telephones, 10,000 lamps, five kilometres of pneumatic tubing for moving items from the various departments to the packing area, and a separate entrance directly from the nearby U-Bahn station. It also contained a summer garden, winter garden and roof garden, an enormous restaurant and several smaller eating areas, its own laundry, a theatre and concert booking office, its own bank, whose strongrooms were underground at the eastern end of the building, and a large fleet of private delivery vehicles. In the run-up to Christmas Wertheim was transformed into a fairytale kingdom, and was well known to children from all over Germany and far beyond.

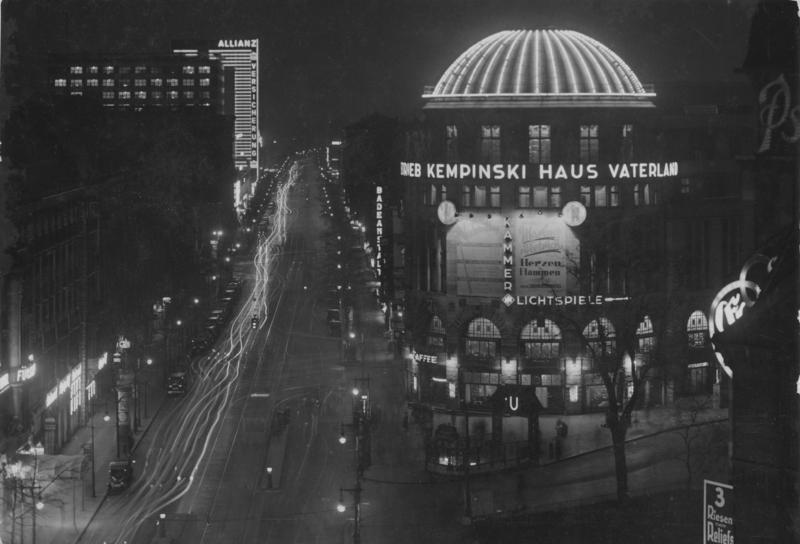
Stresemannstraße at night, July 1932, showing the Haus Vaterland. The Hotel Fürstenhof is in the left foreground while the brightly illuminated building in the distance is Europahaus, opposite the Anhalter Bahnhof.

In Stresemannstrasse, and paralleling the Potsdamer Bahnhof on its eastern side, was another great magnet for shoppers and tourists alike – a huge multi-national-themed eating establishment: the Haus Vaterland. Designed by architect Franz Heinrich Schwechten (1841–1924), who was also responsible for the Anhalter Bahnhof and the Kaiser Wilhelm Memorial Church, it was erected in 1911–12 as the Haus Potsdam. 93 m in length and with a dome rising 35 m above the pavement at the north (Stresemannstrasse) end, it contained the world's largest restaurant – the 2,500-seat Café Piccadilly, plus a 1,200-seat theatre and numerous offices. These included (from 1917 to 1927), the headquarters of Universum Film AG (aka UFA or Ufa), Germany's biggest film company.

On 16 August 1914, less than three weeks after the start of World War I, the Café Piccadilly was given a new name – the more patriotic-sounding Café Vaterland. However, in 1927–8 the architect and entrepreneur Carl Stahl-Urach (1879–1933) transformed the whole building into a gastronomic fantasy land, financed and further elaborated upon by new owners the Kempinski organisation. It reopened on 31 August 1928 as the Haus Vaterland, offering "The World in One House," and could now hold up to 8,000 guests at a time. The Café Vaterland had remained largely untouched, but the 1,200-seat theatre was now a 1,400-seat cinema. The rest of the building had been turned into a large number of theme restaurants, all served from a central kitchen containing the largest gas-fuelled cooking plant in Europe. These included: Rheinterrasse, Löwenbräu (Bavarian beer restaurant), Grinzing (Viennese café and wine bar), Bodega (Spanish winery), Csarda (Hungarian), Wild West Bar (aka the Arizona Bar) (American), Osteria (Italian), Kombüse (Bremen drinking den – literally "galley"), Rübchen (Teltow, named after the well-known turnip dish Teltower Rübchen, made with turnips grown locally in the small town of Teltow just outside Berlin), plus a Turkish café and Japanese tearoom; additionally there was a large ballroom. Up to eight orchestras and dance bands regularly performed in different parts of the building, plus a host of singers, dancers and other entertainers. It should be pointed out here though that not all of these attractions existed simultaneously, owing to changes in those countries that Germany was or was not allied to, in the volatile years leading up to and during World War II, a good example being the closure of the Wild West Bar following America's entry into the war as an enemy of Germany.

Among the major hotels at or near Potsdamer Platz were two designed by the same architect, Otto Rehnig (1864–1925), and opened in the same year, 1908. One was the 600-room Hotel Esplanade (sometimes known as the "Grand Hotel Esplanade"), in Bellevuestrasse. Charlie Chaplin and Greta Garbo were guests there, and Kaiser Wilhelm II himself held regular "gentlemen's evenings" and other functions there in a room that came to be named after him – the Kaisersaal.

The other was the Hotel Excelsior, also 600 rooms but superior provision of other facilities made it the largest hotel in Continental Europe, located in Stresemannstrasse opposite the Anhalter Bahnhof and connected to it by a 100-metre-long subterranean passageway complete with a parade of underground shops.

Two other hotels which shared the same architect, in this case Ludwig Heim (1844–1917), were the 68-room Hotel Bellevue (sometimes known as the "Grand Hotel Bellevue"), built 1887–8, and the 110-room Palast Hotel, built 1892–3 on the site of an earlier hotel. These stood on either side of the northern exit from Potsdamer Platz along Ebertstraße. The Bellevue was well known for its Winter Garden.

Meanwhile, facing the Palast Hotel across the entrance to Leipziger Platz (the Potsdam Gate), was the 400-room Hotel Fürstenhof, by Richard Bielenberg (1871–1929) and Josef Moser (1872–1963), erected in Hotel Fürstenhof (Berlin)|1906–1907, also on the site of an earlier building. With its 200-metre-long main facade along Stresemannstrasse, the Fürstenhof was less opulent than some of the other hotels mentioned, despite its size, but was still popular with business people. The new U-Bahn station was being built at the same time as the hotel and actually ran through the hotel's basement, cutting it in half, thus making the construction of both into something of a technical challenge, but unlike the Wertheim department store (and contrary to several sources), the hotel did not enjoy a separate entrance directly from the station.

The Weinhaus Huth, with its distinctive corner cupola, was a wedge-shaped structure located in the angle between Potsdamer Strasse and Linkstrasse (literally "Left Street"), and with entrances in both streets. Wine merchant Friedrich Karl Christian Huth, whose great-grandfather had been kellermeister (cellar-master) to King Friedrich II back in 1769, had founded the firm in 1871 and taken over the former building in Potsdamer Straße on 23 March 1877. His son, the wine wholesale dealer William ("Willy") Huth (1877–1967), took over the business in 1904 and, a few years later, commissioned the replacement of the building by a new one on the same site. Running right through the block into Linkstrasse, this new Weinhaus Huth was designed by the architects Conrad Heidenreich (1873–1937) and Paul Michel (1877–1938), and opened on 2 October 1912, and contained a wine restaurant on the ground floor, and wine storage space above, so it had to take a lot of weight. It was thus given a strong steel skeleton, which would stand the building in very good stead some three decades after its completion. Famous for its fine claret, numerous members of European society were made welcome there as guests. A total of 15 chefs were employed there, and Alois Hitler Jr., the half-brother of the future Nazi dictator Adolf Hitler, was a waiter there in the 1920s, before he opened his own restaurant and hotel at Wittenbergplatz, in the western part of the city.

Café Josty was one of two rival cafés (the other being the Astoria, later Café Eins A), occupying the broad corner between Potsdamer Strasse and Bellevuestrasse. The Josty company had been founded in 1793 by two Swiss brothers, Johann and Daniel Josty, who had emigrated to Berlin from Sils in Switzerland and set up a bakery from which the café was a 1796 offshoot. It had occupied various locations including (from 1812 till 1880), a site in front of the Berlin City Palace, before moving to Potsdamer Platz in the latter year. A major player on the Berlin café scene, Josty attracted writers, artists, politicians and international society: it was one of the places to be seen. The writer Theodor Fontane, painter Adolph von Menzel, and Dadaist Kurt Schwitters were all guests; Karl Liebknecht, the Spartacus Communist movement leader read a lot here and even made some key political speeches from the pavement terrace, while author Erich Kästner wrote part of his 1929 bestseller for children, Emil und die Detektive (Emil and the Detectives), on the same terrace and made the café the setting for an important scene in the book.

Despite the prestige associated with its name, Café Josty closed in 1930. It then went through an odyssey of re-openings, closures and relaunches under a number of different names including Conditorei Friediger, Café Wiener, Engelhardt Brau and Kaffee Potsdamer Platz (sometimes appearing to have two or more names simultaneously), before its eventual destruction in World War II.

Among the many beer palaces around Potsdamer Platz were two in particular which contained an extensive range of rooms and halls covering a large area. The Alt-Bayern in Potsdamer Strasse was erected by architect Wilhelm Walther (1857–1917) and opened in 1904. After closing in 1914, it underwent a revamp before reopening in 1926 under the new name Bayernhof.

Meanwhile, in Bellevuestrasse, sandwiched between Café Josty and the Hotel Esplanade but extending right through the block with a separate entrance in Potsdamer Strasse, was the Weinhaus Rheingold, built by Bruno Schmitz (1858–1916) and opened on 6 February 1907. Intended to be a concert venue until concerns were raised about increased traffic problems in the already congested streets, it was ruled that it should serve a gastronomic purpose only. Altogether it could accommodate 4,000 guests at a time, 1,100 of these in its main hall alone. Many of the total of 14 banquet and beer halls had a Wagnerian theme – indeed, the very name of the complex was taken from the Wagner opera Das Rheingold, the first of the four parts of the cycle Der Ring des Nibelungen, although this name did hark back to the building's planned former role as a concert venue. Another building by the same architect but which still stands – the "Rosengarten" in Mannheim, has a remarkably similar main facade.

Finally, on the corner between Potsdamer Strasse and the Potsdamer Bahnhof, stood Bierhaus Siechen, built by Johann Emil Schaudt (1874–1957), opened in 1910 and relaunched under a new name, Pschorr-Haus.

At 8.00 p.m. on 29 October 1923, Germany's first radio broadcast was made from a building (Vox-Haus) close by in Potsdamer Strasse. Standing alongside the Weinhaus Rheingold's Potsdamer Strasse entrance, this five-storey steel-framed edifice had been erected as an office building in 1907–8 by architect and one-time Berlin inspector of buildings Otto Stahn (1859–1930), who was also responsible for the city's Oberbaumbrücke over the River Spree. In 1920 the Vox-group had taken over the building and the following year commissioned its remodelling by Swiss architect Rudolf Otto Salvisberg (1882–1940), and then erected two transmitting antennae. Despite several upgrades between December 1923 and July 1924, the nearby Hotel Esplanade's formidable bulk prevented the transmitter from functioning effectively and so in December 1924 it was superseded by a better sited new one, but Vox-Haus lived on as the home of Germany's first radio station, Radiostunde Berlin, founded in 1923, renamed Funkstunde in March 1924, but it moved to a new home in 1931 and closed in 1934.

In addition, the former Millionaires' Quarter just to the west of Potsdamer Platz had become a much favoured location for other countries to site their embassies. By the early 1930s there were so many diplomats living and working in the area that it came to be redesignated the "Diplomatic Quarter". By 1938, 37 out of 52 embassies and legations in Berlin, and 28 out of 29 consulates, were situated here.

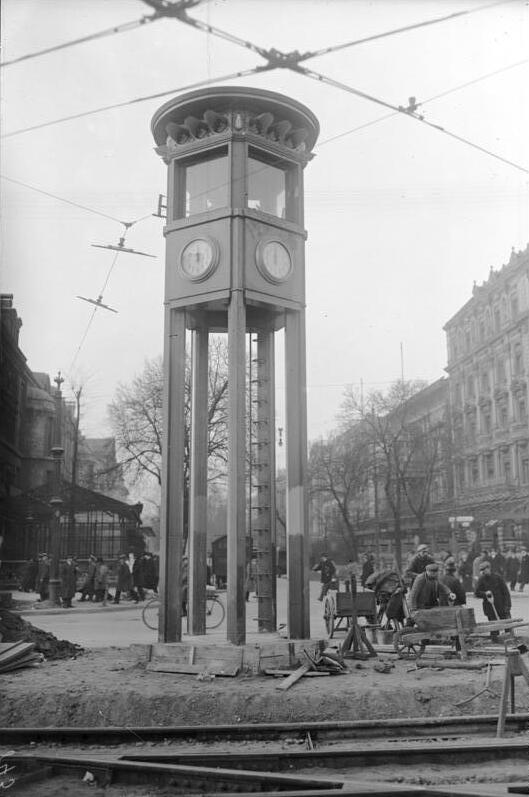
The traffic light tower in November 1924, one month in operation (the ground around it still has to be cleared and paved). The street behind it is Bellevuestraße, with the canopy over Café Josty's pavement terrace visible on the left.

The first traffic light tower in Germany was erected at Potsdamer Platz on 20 October 1924 and went into service on 15 December 1924 in an attempt to control the sheer volume of traffic passing through.

This traffic had grown to extraordinary levels. Even in 1900, more than 100,000 people, 20,000 cars, horse-drawn vehicles and handcarts, plus many thousands of bicycles, passed through the platz daily. By the 1920s the number of cars had soared to 60,000. The trams added greatly to this. The first four lines had appeared in 1880, rising to 13 by 1897, all horse-drawn, but after electrification between 1898 and 1902 the number of lines had soared to 35 by 1908 and ultimately reached 40, carrying among them 600 trams every hour, day and night. Services were run by a large number of companies.

After 1918 most of the tram companies joined. In 1923, at the peak of the Hyperinflation the tram traffic was stopped for two days and a new communal company called Berliner Straßenbahn-Betriebs-GmbH was founded. Finally in 1929 all communal traffic companies (Underground, Tram and Buses) were unified into the Berliner Verkehrsbetriebe (Berlin Transport Services) company.

At the Potsdamer Platz up to 11 policemen at a time had tried to control all this traffic but with varying success. The delays in tram traffic increased and the job was very dangerous for the policemen. The Berliner Straßenbahn-Betriebs-GmbH started researches to control the traffic on the main streets and places in 1924. Berlin traffic experts visited colleagues in Paris, London and New York. They had to organize the traffic, define traffic rules and select a solution to control the traffic. In New York, Fifth Avenue they found traffic light towers designed by Joseph H. Freedlander in 1922 which can be regarded as a model for the Berlin tower.

The Potsdamer Platz five-sided 8.5 m high traffic tower was designed by Jean Kramer, a German architect. The traffic lights were delivered by Siemens & Halske and mounted on top of the tower cabin. A solitary policeman sat in a small cabin at the top of the tower and switched the lights around manually, until they were automated in 1926. Yet some officers still remained on the ground in case people did not pay any attention to the lights. The tower remained until October 1937, when it was removed to allow for excavations for the new S-Bahn underground line. On 26 September 1997, a replica of the tower was erected, just for show, close to its original location by Siemens, to celebrate the company's 150th anniversary. The replica was moved again on 29 September 2000, to the place where it stands today.

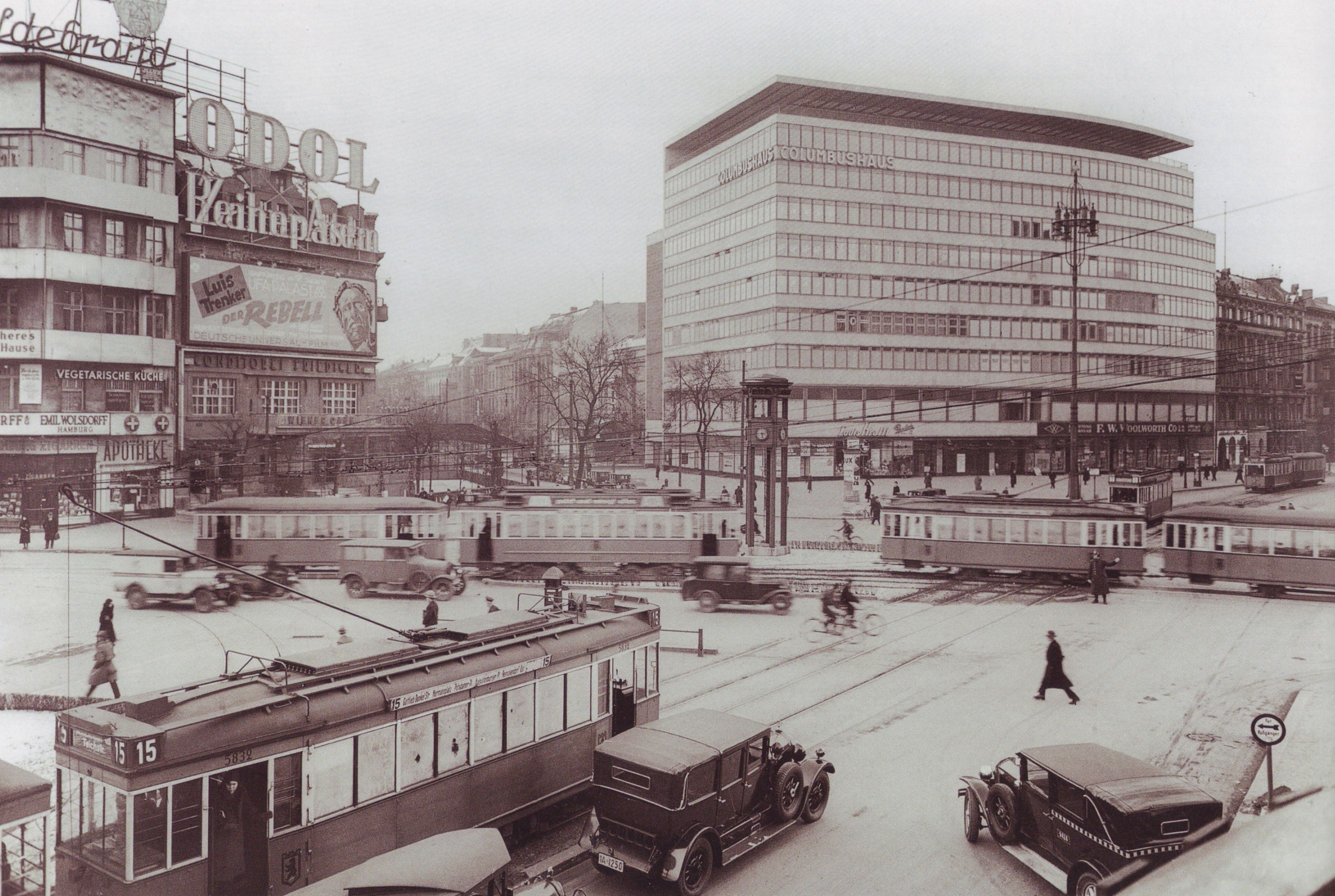
Pre-World War II heyday: Potsdamer Platz in 1932, showing the ultra-modern Columbushaus nearing completion.

The traffic problems that had blighted Potsdamer Platz for decades continued to be a big headache, despite the new lights, and these led to a strong desire to solve them once and for all. By now Berlin was a major centre of innovation in many different fields including architecture. In addition, the city's colossal pace of change (compared by some to that of Chicago), had caused its chief planner, Martin Wagner (1885–1957), to foresee the entire centre being made over totally as often as every 25 years. These factors combined to produce some far more radical and futuristic plans for Potsdamer Platz in the late 1920s and early 1930s, especially around 1928–9, when the creative fervour was at its peak. On the cards was an almost total redevelopment of the area. One design submitted by Wagner himself comprised an array of gleaming new buildings arranged around a vast multi-level system of fly-overs and underpasses, with a huge glass-roofed circular car-park in the middle. Unfortunately the worldwide Great Depression of the time, triggered by the Wall Street crash of 1929, meant that most of the plans remained on the drawing board. However, in Germany this depression was virtually a continuation of an economic morass that had blighted the country since the end of World War I, partly the result of the war reparations the country had been made to pay, and this morass had brought about the closure and demolition of the Grand Hotel Belle Vue, on the corner of Bellevuestrasse and Königgrätzer Strasse, thus enabling one revolutionary new building to struggle through to reality despite considerable financial odds.

Columbushaus was the result of a plan by the French retail company Galeries Lafayette, whose flagship store was the legendary Galeries Lafayette in Paris, to open a counterpart in Berlin, on the Grand Hotel Belle Vue's former site, but financial worries made them pull out. Undaunted, the architect, Erich Mendelsohn (1887–1953), erected vast advertising boards around the perimeter of the site, and the revenue generated by these enabled him to proceed with the development anyway. Columbushaus was a ten-storey ultra-modern office building, years ahead of its time, containing Germany's first artificial ventilation system, and whose elegance and clean lines won it much praise. However, despite a Woolworths store on its ground floor, a major travel company housed on the floor above, and a restaurant offering fine views over the city from the top floor, the economic situation of the time meant that it would not be followed by more buildings in that vein: no further redevelopment in the immediate vicinity of Potsdamer Platz occurred prior to World War II, and so Columbushaus would always seem out of place in that location. Nevertheless, its exact position showed that the platz was starting to be opened out: the former hotel had mostly stood on a large flagged area laid out in front of it, indicating that the new building curved away from the existing street line; this would have enabled future street widening to take place.

== Hitler and Germania plans ==
Columbushaus was completed and opened in January 1933, the same month that the Nazi dictator Adolf Hitler (1889–1945) came to power. Hitler had big plans for Berlin, to transform it into the Welthauptstadt (World Capital) Germania, to be realised by his architect friend Albert Speer (1905–81). Under these plans the immediate vicinity of Potsdamer Platz would have got off fairly lightly, although the Potsdamer Bahnhof (and the Anhalter Bahnhof a short distance away) would have lost their function. The new North-South Axis, the linchpin of the scheme, would have severed their approach tracks, leaving both termini stranded on the wrong side of it. All trains arriving in Berlin would have run into either of two vast new stations located on the Ringbahn to the north and south of the centre respectively, to be known as Nordbahnhof (North Station) and Südbahnhof (South Station), located at Wedding and Südkreuz. In Speer's plan the former Anhalter Bahnhof was earmarked to become a public swimming pool; the intended fate of the Potsdamer Bahnhof has not been documented.

Meanwhile, the North-South Axis would have cut a giant swathe passing just to the west of Potsdamer Platz, some 5 km long and up to 100 m wide, and lined with Nazi government edifices on a gargantuan scale. The eastern half of the former Millionaires' Quarter, including Stüler's Matthiaskirche, would have been totally eradicated. New U-Bahn and S-Bahn lines were planned to run directly beneath almost the whole length of the axis, and the city's entire underground network reoriented to gravitate towards this new hub (at least one tunnel section, around 220 metres in length, was actually constructed and still exists today, buried some 20 metres beneath the Tiergarten, despite having never seen a train). This was in addition to the S-Bahn North-South Link beneath Potsdamer Platz itself, which went forward to completion, opening in stages in 1939. In the event, a substantial amount of demolition did take place in Potsdamer Straße, between the platz itself and the Landwehrkanal, and this became the location of the one Germania building that actually went forward to a state of virtual completion: architect Theodor Dierksmeier's Haus des Fremdenverkehrs (House of Tourism), basically a giant state-run travel agency. More significantly, its curving eastern facade marked the beginnings of the Runden Platz (Round Platz), a huge circular public space at the point where the North-South Axis and Potsdamer Straße intersected. Additionally, the southern edge of the Tiergarten was to be redefined, with a new road planned to slice through the built-up area immediately to the north of Columbushaus (although Columbushaus itself would remain unscathed); this road would line up with Voßstraße, one block to the north of Leipziger Platz. Here Albert Speer erected Hitler's enormous new Reichskanzlei building, and yet even this was little more than a dry run for an even larger structure some distance further away.

Meanwhile, the Nazi influence was no less evident at Potsdamer Platz than anywhere else in Berlin. As well as swastika flags and propaganda everywhere, Nazi-affiliated concerns occupied a great many buildings in the area, especially Columbushaus, where they took over most of the upper floors. As if to emphasise their presence, they used the building to advertise their own weekly publication: a huge neon sign on its roof proclaimed DIE BRAUNE POST – N.S. SONNTAGSZEITUNG (The Brown Post – N.S. Sunday Newspaper), the N.S. standing for Nationalsozialist (National Socialist), i.e. Nazi. Probably Potsdamer Platz's most prominent landmark in the mid-1930s, the sign first appears in photographs dated 1935 but was gone again by 1938. On an even darker note, those Nazi concerns included the Gestapo, who set up a secret prison in an upper part of the building, complete with interrogation and torture rooms. Meanwhile, in another part of the building, the Information Office of the Olympic Games Organising Committee was housed. Here much of the planning of the 1936 Berlin Summer Olympic Games took place.

== World War II ==
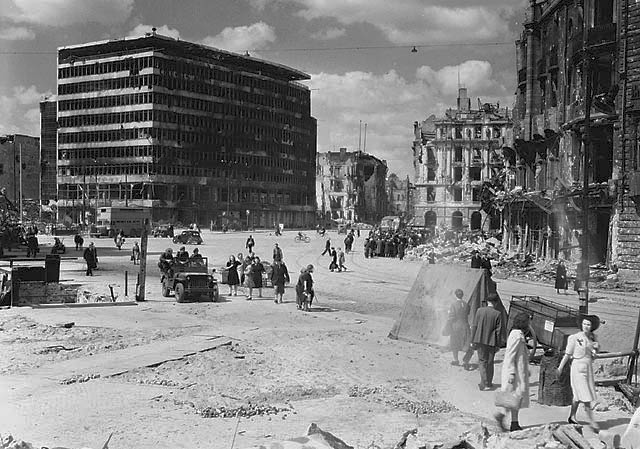
Devastation in 1945. The burnt-out Columbushaus is in the left background.

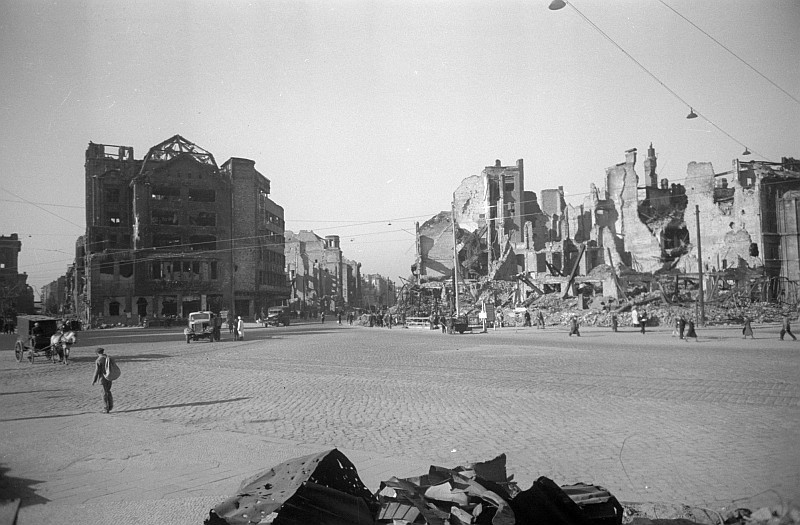
Potsdamer Platz in October 1945. The Pschorr-Haus is the recognizable structure on the left. A short way down Potsdamer Straße on the left side the corner cupola of the Weinhaus Huth can be seen, while on the right are the ruins of Café Josty and the Weinhaus Rheingold.

As was the case in most of central Berlin, almost all of the buildings around Potsdamer Platz were turned to rubble by air raids and heavy artillery bombardment during the last years of World War II. The three most destructive raids (out of 363 that the city suffered), occurred on 23 November 1943, and 3 and 26 February 1945. Things were not helped by the very close proximity of Hitler's Reich Chancellery, just one block away in Voßstraße, and many other Nazi government edifices nearby as well, and so Potsdamer Platz was right in a major target area.

Once the bombing and shelling had largely ceased, the ground invasion began as Soviet forces stormed the centre of Berlin street by street, building by building, aiming to capture the Reich Chancellery and other key symbols of the Nazi government. When the city was divided into sectors by the occupying Allies at the end of the war, the square found itself on the boundary between the American, British and Soviet sectors.

Despite all the devastation, commercial life reappeared in the ruins around Potsdamer Platz within just a few weeks of war's end. The lower floors of a few buildings were patched up enough to allow business of a sort to resume. The U-Bahn and S-Bahn were partially operational again from 2 June 1946, fully from 16 November 1947 (although repairs were not completed until May 1948) and trams by 1952. Part of the Haus Vaterland reopened in 1948 in a much simplified form. The new East German state-owned retail business H.O. (Handelsorganisation, meaning Trading Organisation), had seized almost all of Wertheim's former assets in the newly created German Democratic Republic but, unable to start up the giant Leipziger Platz store again (it was too badly damaged), it opened a new Kaufhaus (department store) on the ground floor of Columbushaus. An office of the Kasernierte Volkspolizei (literally "Barracked People's Police") – the military precursor of the Nationale Volksarmee (National People's Army), occupied the floor above. Meanwhile, a row of new single-storey shops was erected along Potsdamer Straße. Out on the streets, even the flower-sellers, for whom the area had once been renowned, were doing brisk business again.

The area around Potsdamer Platz had also become a focus for black market trading. Since the American, British and Soviet Occupation Zones converged there, people theoretically only had to walk a few paces across sector boundaries to avoid the respective police officials.

== The Cold War ==
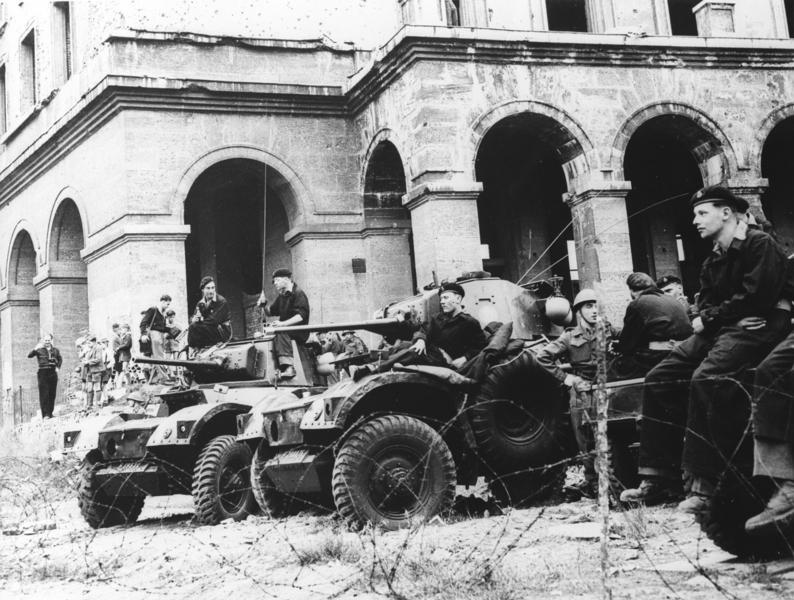
Potsdamer Platz in May 1950 – British Daimler Armoured Cars in front of the House of Tourism ("Haus des Fremdenverkehrs")

Meanwhile, friction between the Western Allies and Soviets was steadily rising. The Soviets even took to marking out their border by stationing armed soldiers along it at intervals of a few metres, day and night, in all weathers. Since there was not, as yet, a fixed marker, the borders were prone to abuse, which eventually resulted (in August 1948), in white lines in luminous paint appearing across roads and even through ruined buildings to try to deter the Soviets from making unauthorised incursions into the American and British zones. These measures were only partially successful: after further skirmishes in which shots were fired, barbed wire entanglements were stretched across some roads, a foretaste of things to come.

=== The free Berlin press versus the wise Berliner ===
Remembering the effective use of propaganda in the leadup to the second World War, the opposing camps later began berating one another with enormous signs displaying loud political slogans, facing each other across the border zone. That on the western side was erected first, in direct response to the ban on sales of Western newspapers in East Berlin, and comprised an illuminated display board 30 m wide and 1.5 m deep, facing east, supported on three steel lattice towers 25 m high and topped by the words DIE FREIE BERLINER PRESSE MELDET (The Free Berlin Press Announces). Important messages were spelt out on the display board using up to 2,000 bulbs. The sign was switched on for the first time on 10 October 1950, watched by a large crowd. On 18 November, the Communist authorities in the east ordered its destruction using a catapult made from a compressed air hose loaded with pebbles and small pieces of metal. However, the order was not executed and the sign lasted until 1974, an eventual victim of its own high maintenance costs.

Not to be outdone, East Berlin had meanwhile erected a sign of its own. This was up and running by 25 November 1950, less than seven weeks after its western counterpart, albeit for a much shorter time period. (It was demolished on 29 January 1953.) Facing towards West Berlin was the proclamation DER KLUGE BERLINER KAUFT BEI DER H.O. (The Wise Berliner Buys With The HO) Underneath were the words NÄCHSTE VERKAUFSSTELLEN (Next Sales Premises), between two arrows pointing left and right, suggesting that large shopping developments were forthcoming in the immediate vicinity, although these never appeared.

What was not apparent from the western side however, was that East Berlin's construction boasted its own illuminated display board facing east, whose messages comprised the version of the news that the Communist authorities in the east wanted their citizens to believe. In addition, the East Berlin sign was carefully placed so that, when viewed from further away down Leipziger Strasse, its display board obscured the West Berlin sign standing beyond it. Over the next two years, West Berlin would regularly raise or lower its sign to make it more easily visible from the East again – and then East Berlin would raise or lower its own construction to obscure it once more. Furthermore, the East German Government also exploited the huge facade of the nearby Columbushaus as a further propaganda tool.

=== The 1953 uprising ===
More significantly, living and working conditions in East Germany were rapidly worsening under Communist rule. Tensions finally reached breaking point and a Workers' Uprising took place on 17 June 1953, to be quickly and brutally crushed when Soviet tanks rolled in, and some of the worst violence occurred around Potsdamer Platz, where several people were killed by the Volkspolizei. No one really knows how many people died during the uprising itself, or by the subsequent death sentences. There are 55 known victims, but other estimates state at least 125. West German estimates were much higher: in 1966 the West German Ministry for Inter-German Affairs claimed that 383 people died in the uprising, including 116 "functionaries of the SED regime", with an additional 106 executed under martial law or condemned to death, while 1,838 were injured and 5,100 arrested, 1,200 of these sentenced to a total of six thousand years in penal camps. It was also claimed that 17 or 18 Soviet soldiers were executed for refusing to shoot demonstrating workers, but this remains unconfirmed by post-1990 research. Whatever the casualty figures, for the second time in eight years, the "busiest and most famous square in Europe" had been transformed into a bloody battleground. Columbushaus, with its H.O. store on the ground floor and military police station above, had been a prime target in the insurrection and been burnt out yet again, along with the Haus Vaterland and other premises. This time, they were not rehabilitated.

As Cold War tensions rose still further during the 1950s, restrictions were placed on travel between the Soviet sector (East Berlin) and the western sectors (West Berlin). For the second time in its history, the Potsdam Gate (or what remained of it), was like a dividing line between two different worlds. Lying on this invisible frontier, Potsdamer Platz was no longer an important destination for Berliners. Similarly, neither East Berlin nor West Berlin regarded their half as a priority area for redevelopment, seeking instead to distance themselves from the traditional heart of the city and develop two new centres for themselves, well away from the troubled border zone. West Berlin inevitably chose the Kurfürstendamm and the area around the Kaiser Wilhelm Memorial Church, while East Berlin built up Alexanderplatz and turned Frankfurter Allee (which they renamed Stalinallee in 1949, Karl-Marx-Allee in 1961), into their own showpiece boulevard. Potsdamer Platz, meanwhile, was more or less left to rot, as one by one the ruined buildings were cleared away, neither side having the will to repair or replace them. On the western side things did improve with the development of the Cultural Forum, whose site roughly equates with the former Millionaires' Quarter.

== The Berlin Wall ==
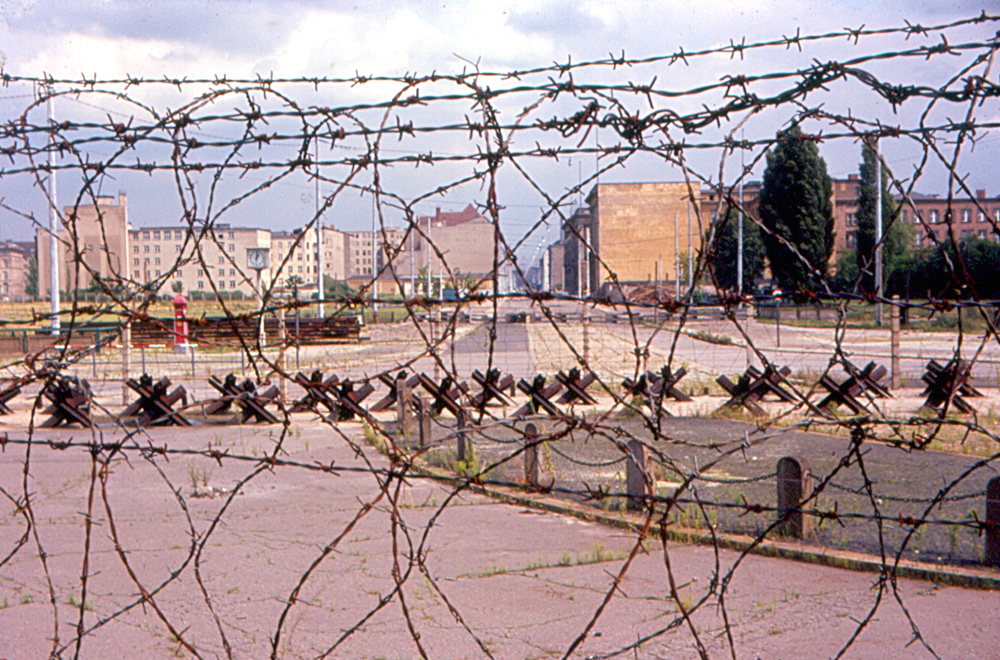
Potsdamer Platz seen through barbed wire in 1963

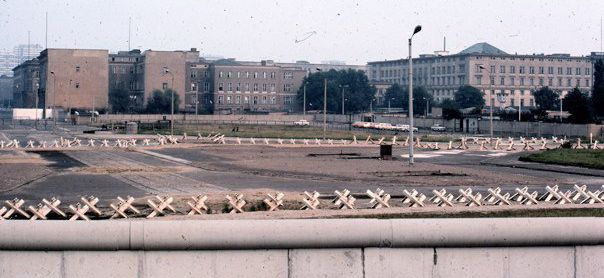
Empty Potsdamer Platz in 1977

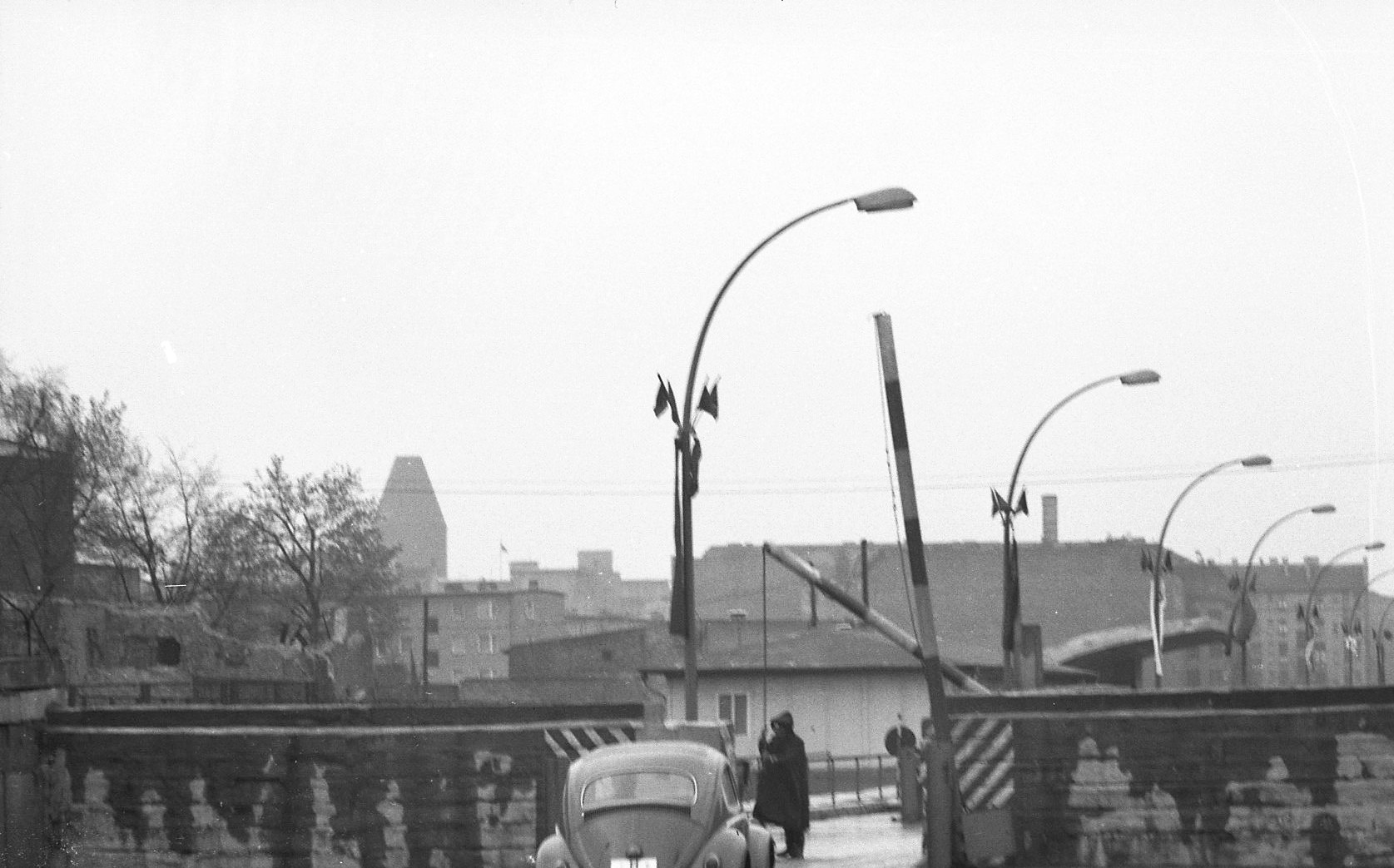
Berlin Wall at Potsdamerplatz 1962

With the construction of the Berlin Wall on 13 August 1961, along the intracity frontier, Potsdamer Platz now found itself physically divided in two. What had once been a busy intersection had become totally desolate. With the clearance of most of the remaining bomb-damaged buildings on both sides (on the eastern side, this was done chiefly to give border guards a clear view of would-be escapees and an uninterrupted line of fire), little was left in an area of dozens of hectares. Further demolitions occurred up until 1976 when the Haus Vaterland finally disappeared. After that, only two buildings in the immediate vicinity of Potsdamer Platz still stood – one complete, the other in a half-ruined fragmented form: the Weinhaus Huth's steel skeleton had enabled the building to withstand the pounding of World War II virtually undamaged, and it stood out starkly amid a great levelled wasteland, although now occupied only by groups of squatters. A short distance away stood portions of the former Hotel Esplanade, including the Kaisersaal, used at various times as a much scaled-down hotel, cinema, nightclub and occasional film-set (scenes from Cabaret were shot there). Apart from these, no other buildings remained. Below ground, the U-Bahn section through Potsdamer Platz had closed entirely; although the S-Bahn line itself remained open, it suffered from a quirk of geography in that it briefly passed through East German territory en route from one part of West Berlin to another. Consequently, Potsdamer Platz S-Bahn station became the most infamous of several Geisterbahnhofe (ghost stations), through which trains ran without stopping, its previously bustling platforms now decrepit, sealed off from the outside world, and patrolled by armed guards.

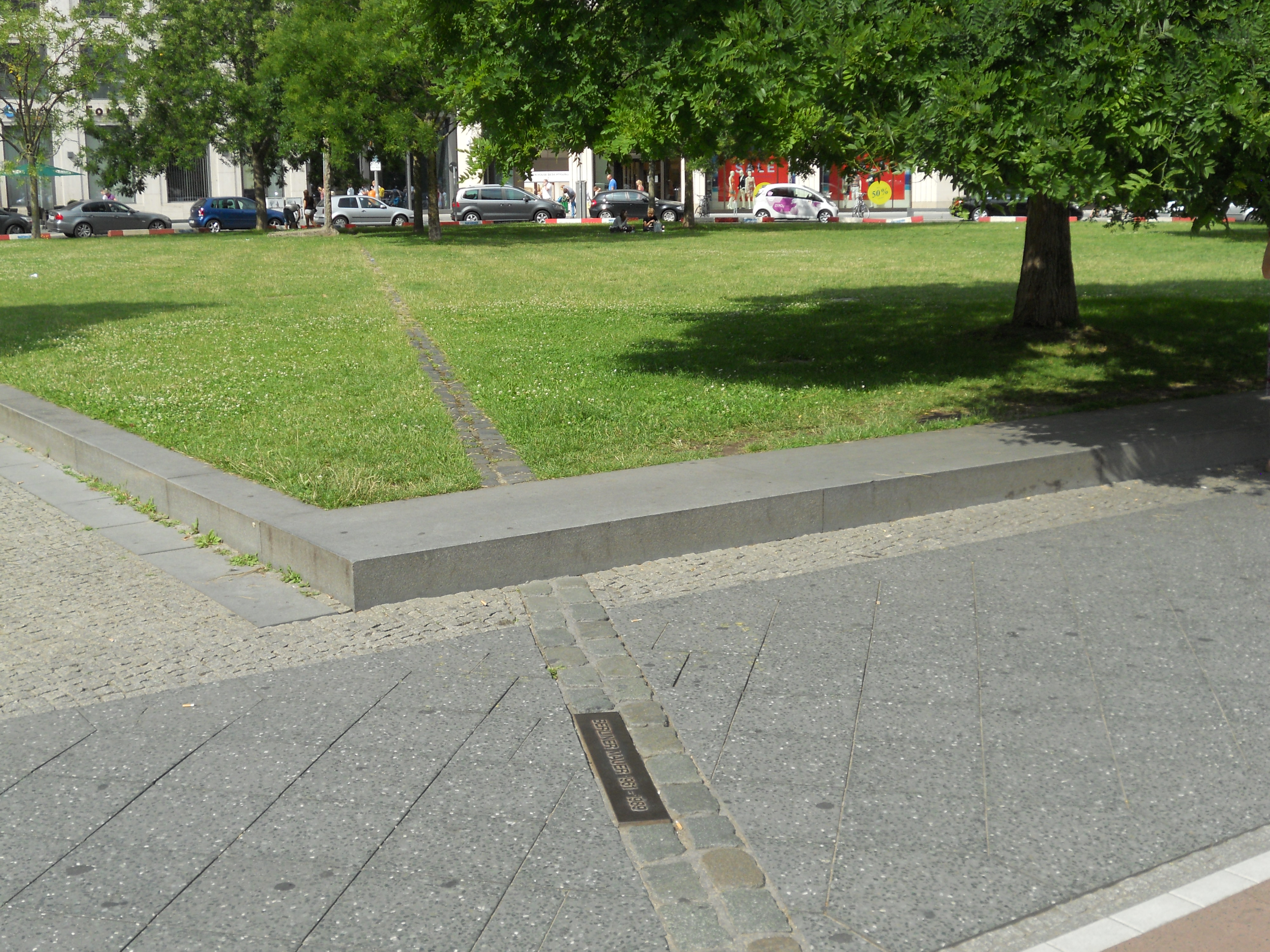
Line on the ground marking where the Wall used to stand, on the edge of Leipziger Platz (2015)

During its 28 years, Potsdamer Platz was a point of interest for many people on the western side, including tourists, visiting politicians, and heads of state. The row of post-war single-storey shops in Potsdamer Straße sold a variety of souvenirs, many of which were purchased by visitors brought by coach to the location. An observation platform had been erected, primarily for military personnel and police but also used by members of the public, so that they could look over the Wall at the area beyond. Among the V.I.P.s who came to look were U.S. Senator Robert F. Kennedy (22 February 1962), Prime Minister Harold Wilson of the United Kingdom (6 March 1965), Queen Elizabeth II of the United Kingdom (27 May 1965), Charles, Prince of Wales (3 November 1972), U.S. President Jimmy Carter (15 July 1978), and U.S. Vice President George H. W. Bush (1 February 1983).

Some scenes of the 1987 Wim Wenders movie Der Himmel über Berlin (English title: Wings of Desire) were filmed on the old, almost entirely void Potsdamer Platz before the Berlin Wall fell. In one scene an old man named Homer, played by actor Curt Bois, searches in vain for Potsdamer Platz, but finds only rubble, weeds and the graffiti-covered Berlin Wall. The movie thus gives a good impression of the surroundings at the time, which are completely unlike what can be seen today.

=== Photos, 1975–1989 ===
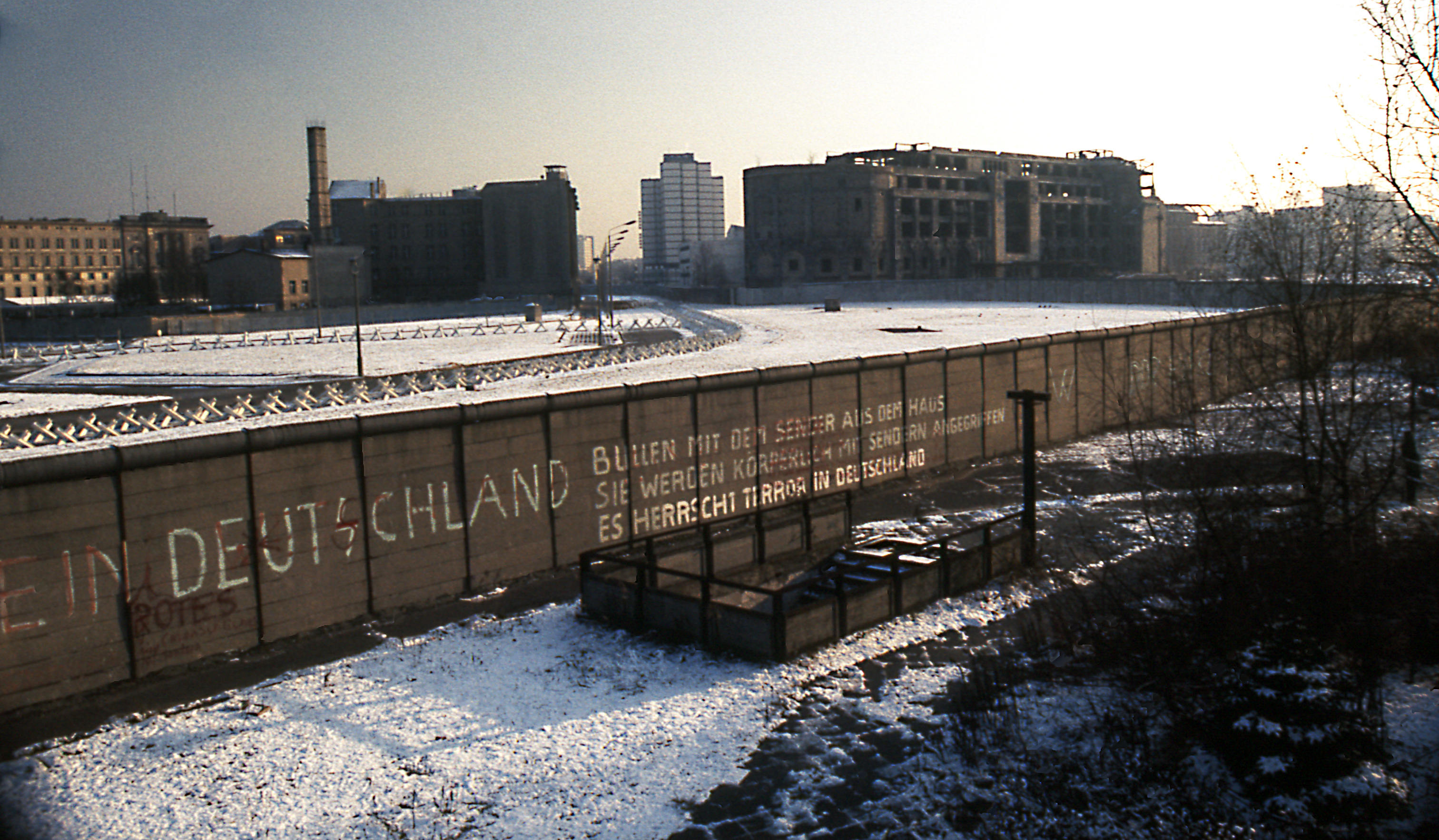
Berlin Wall at Potsdamer Platz, 1975, looking southeast into Stresemannstraße

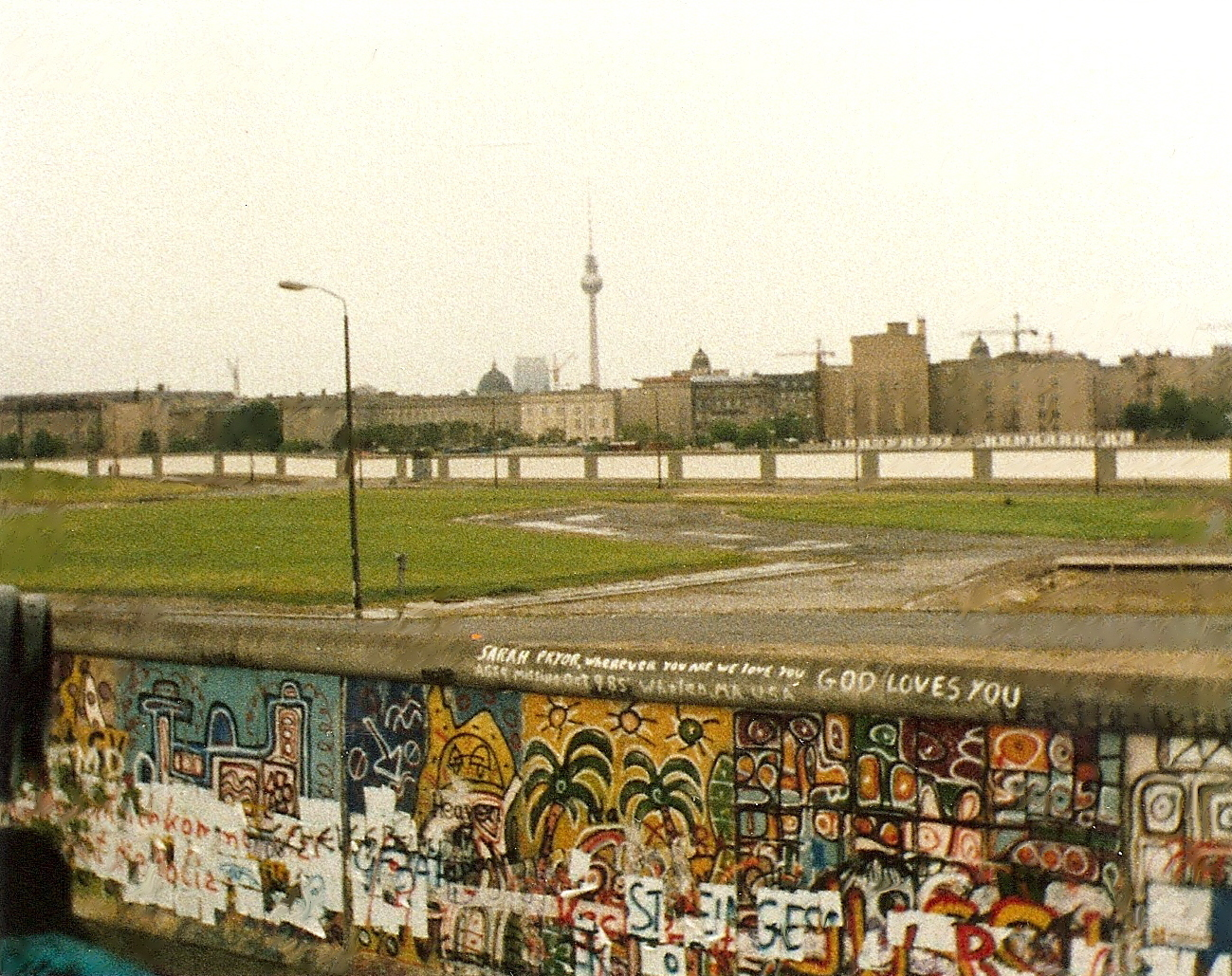
Potsdamer Platz, 1986

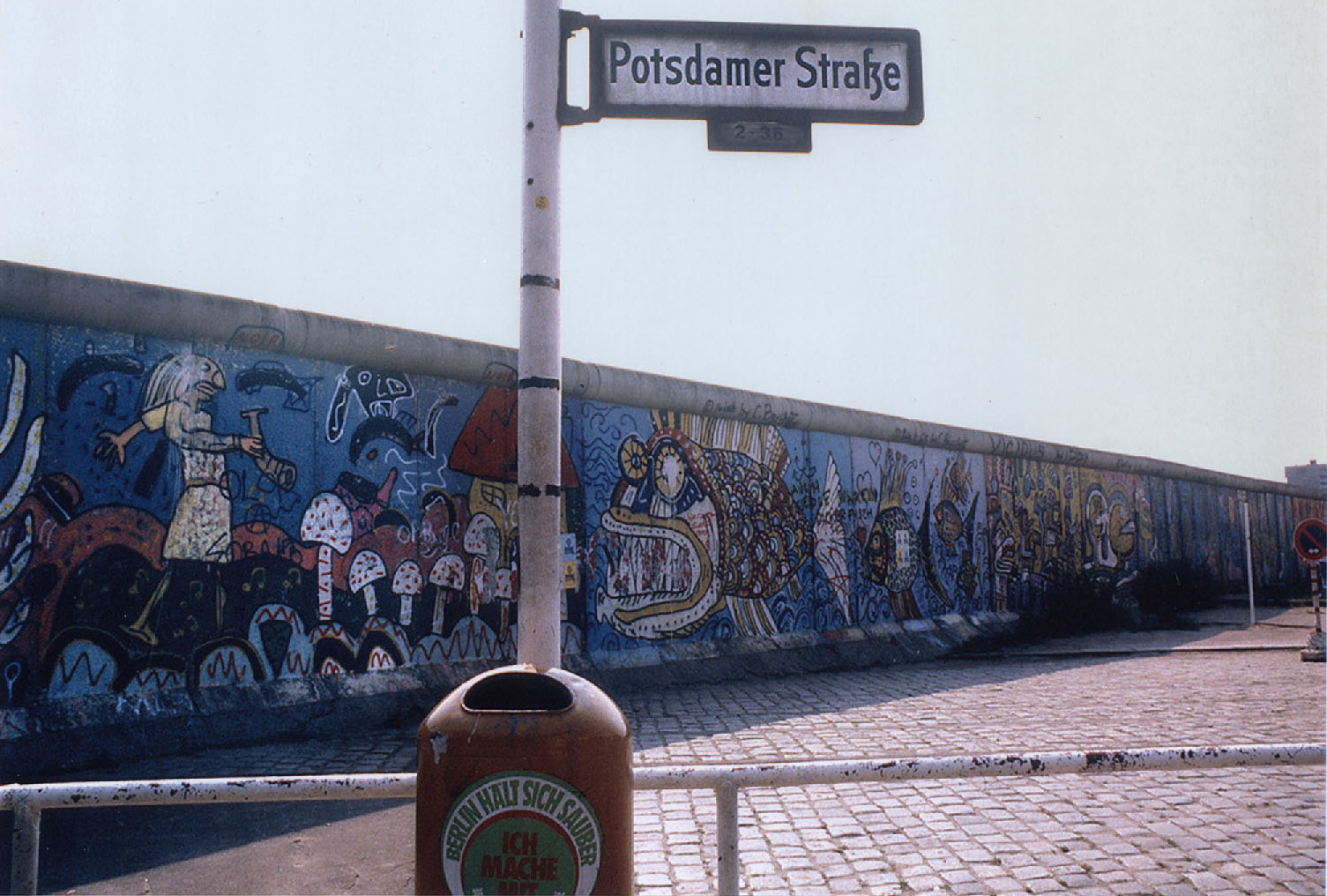
Potsdamer Strasse, 1986

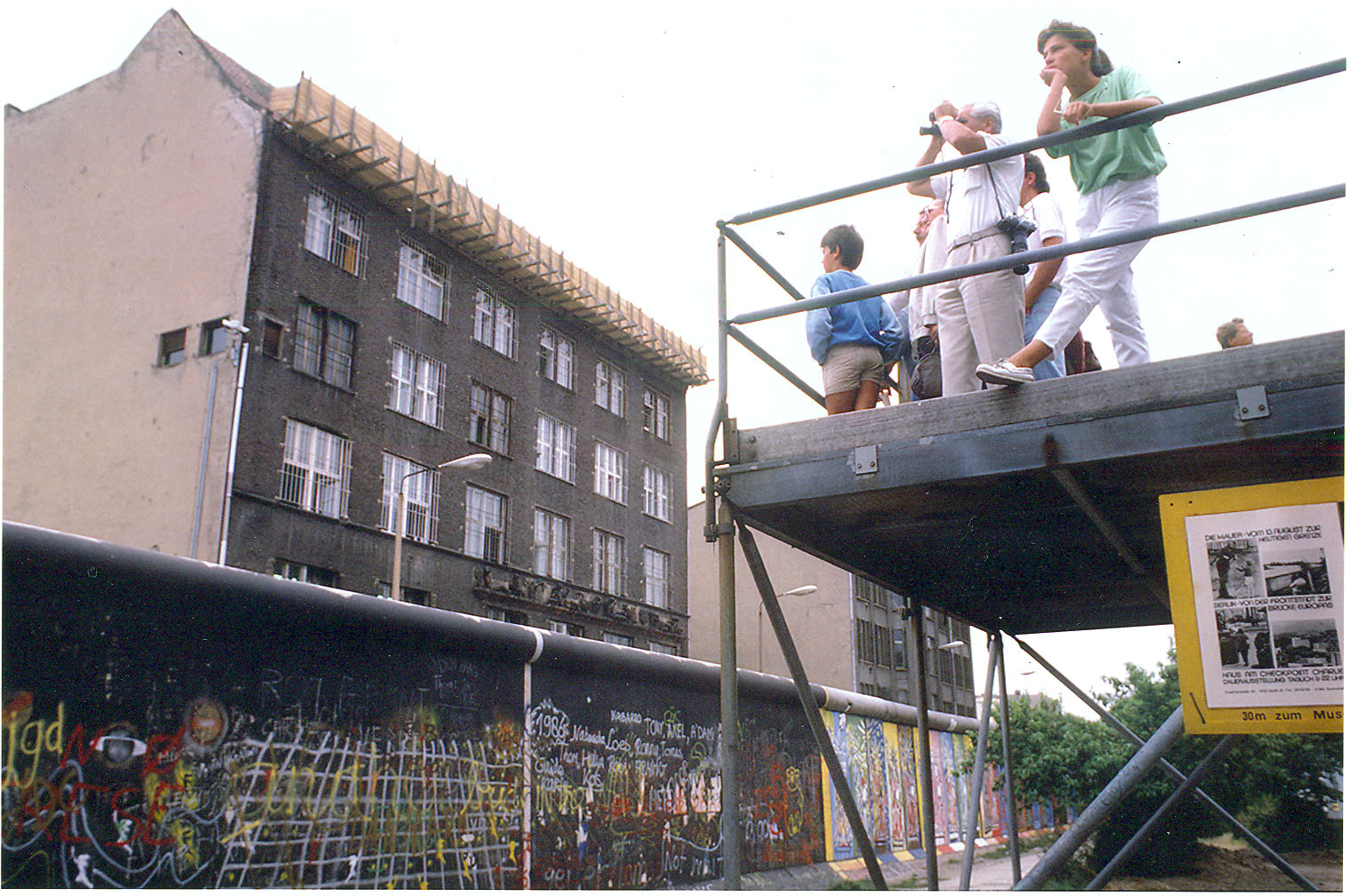
A view from the West Berlin side on the 25th anniversary of the Wall

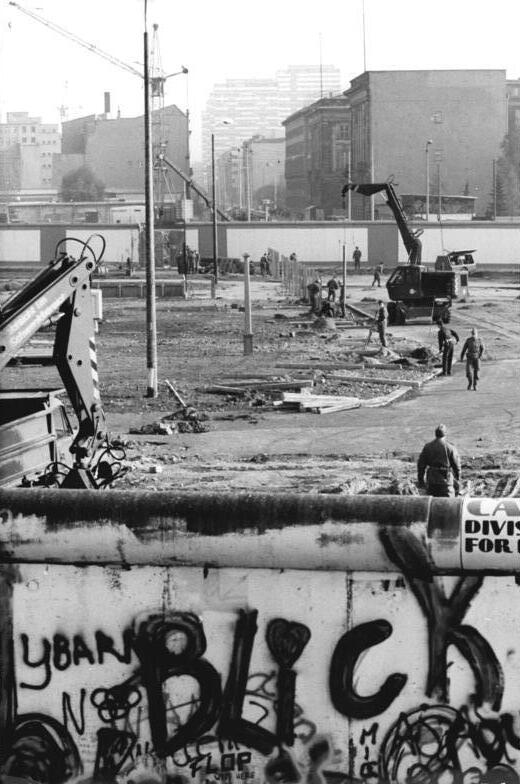
Workers clearing the square for a new border crossing, November 1989

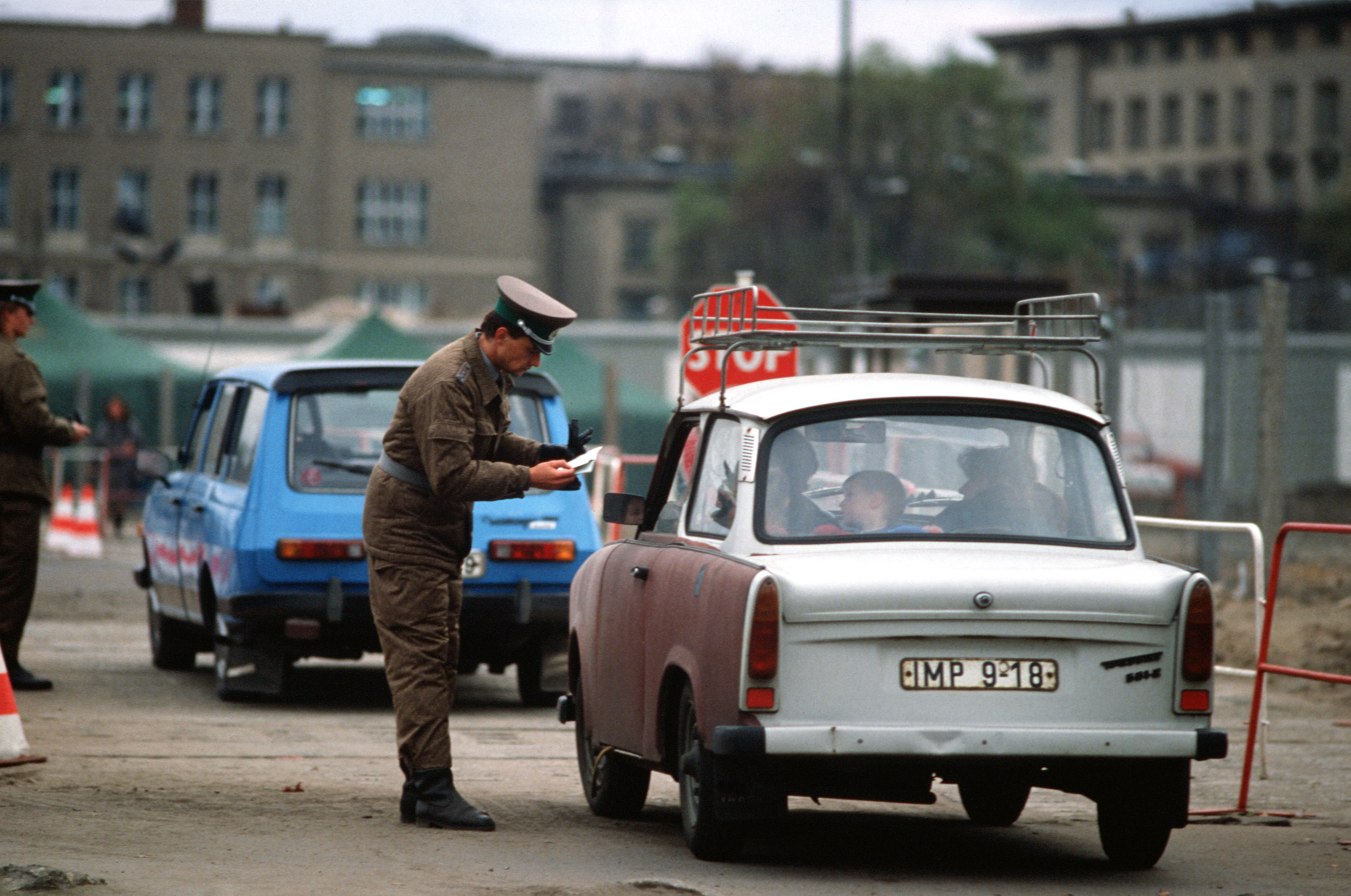
East German officer monitors traffic returning to East Berlin, November 1989.

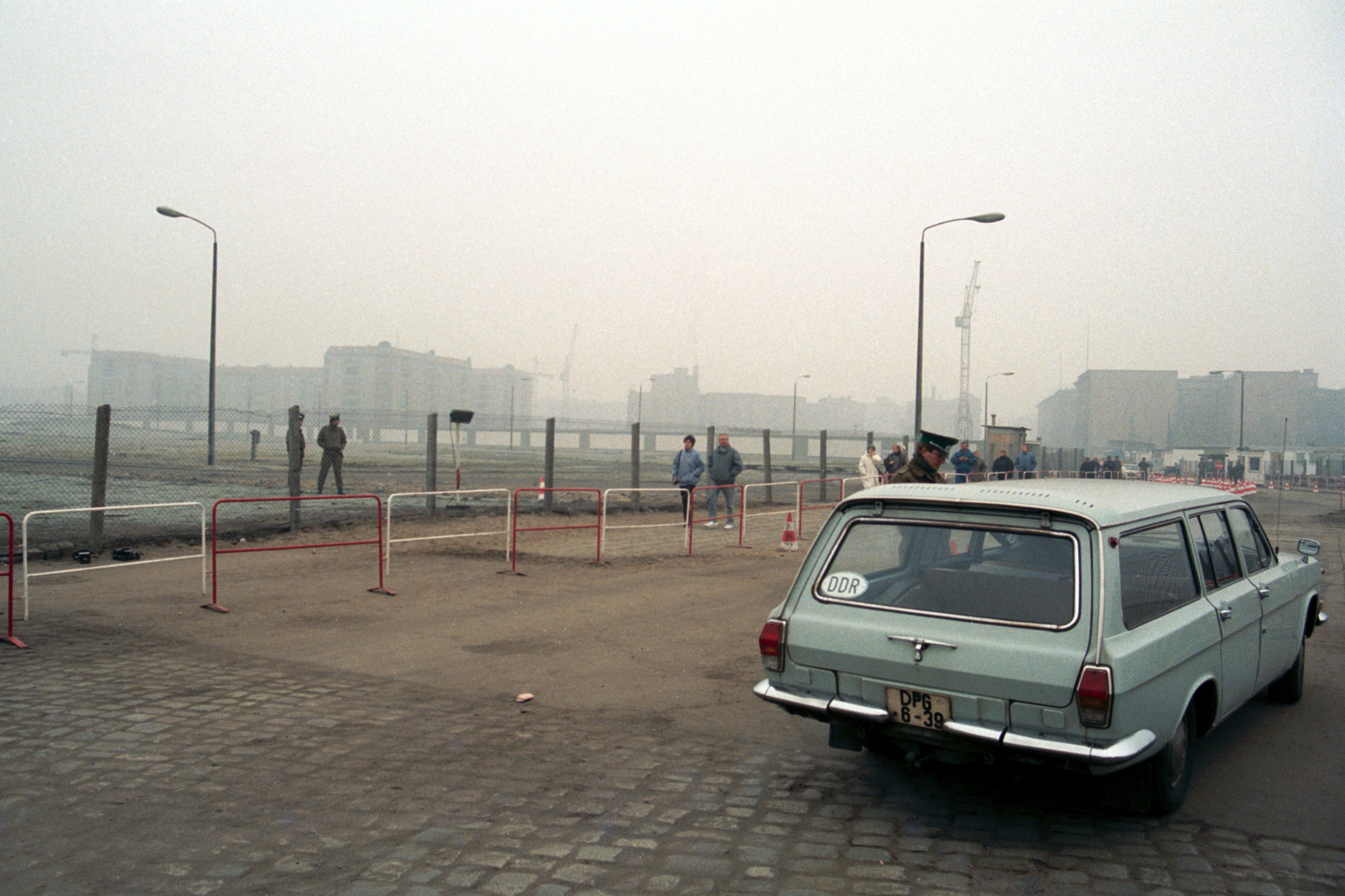
East German officer checks a car returning to East Berlin, November 1989.

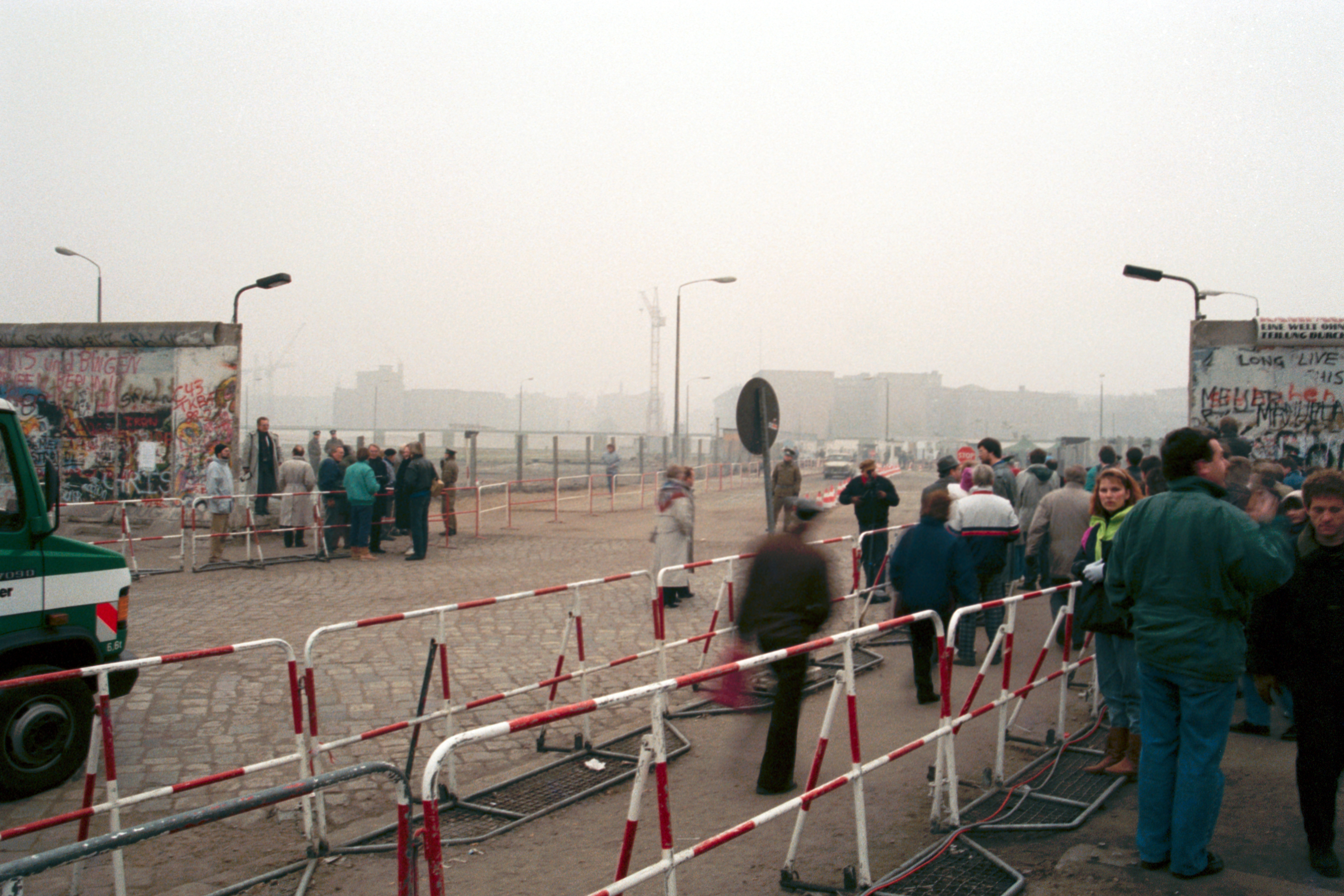
Crossing between East and West Berlin, November 1989

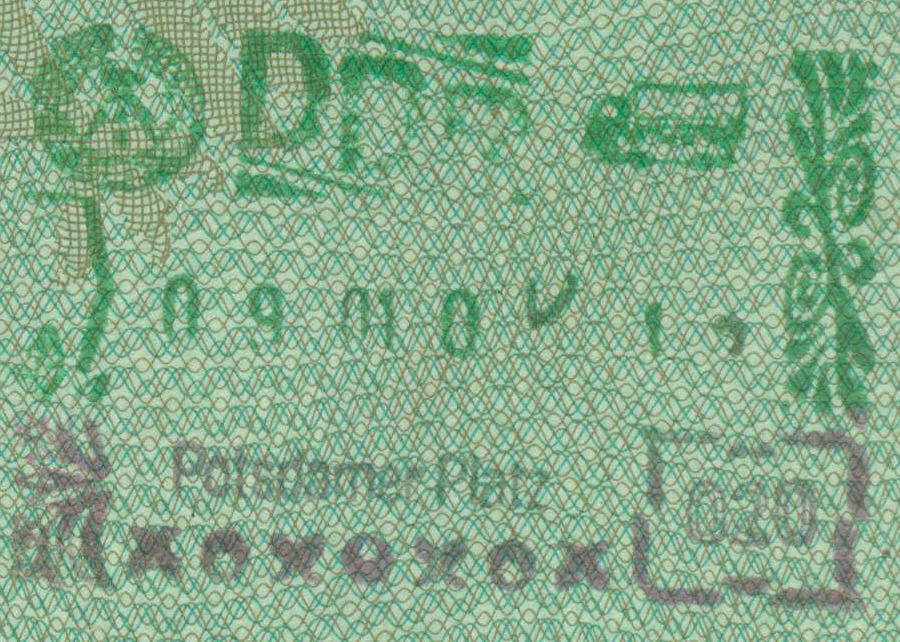
Potsdamer Platz crossing passport stamp, 1990

== The fall of the Wall ==
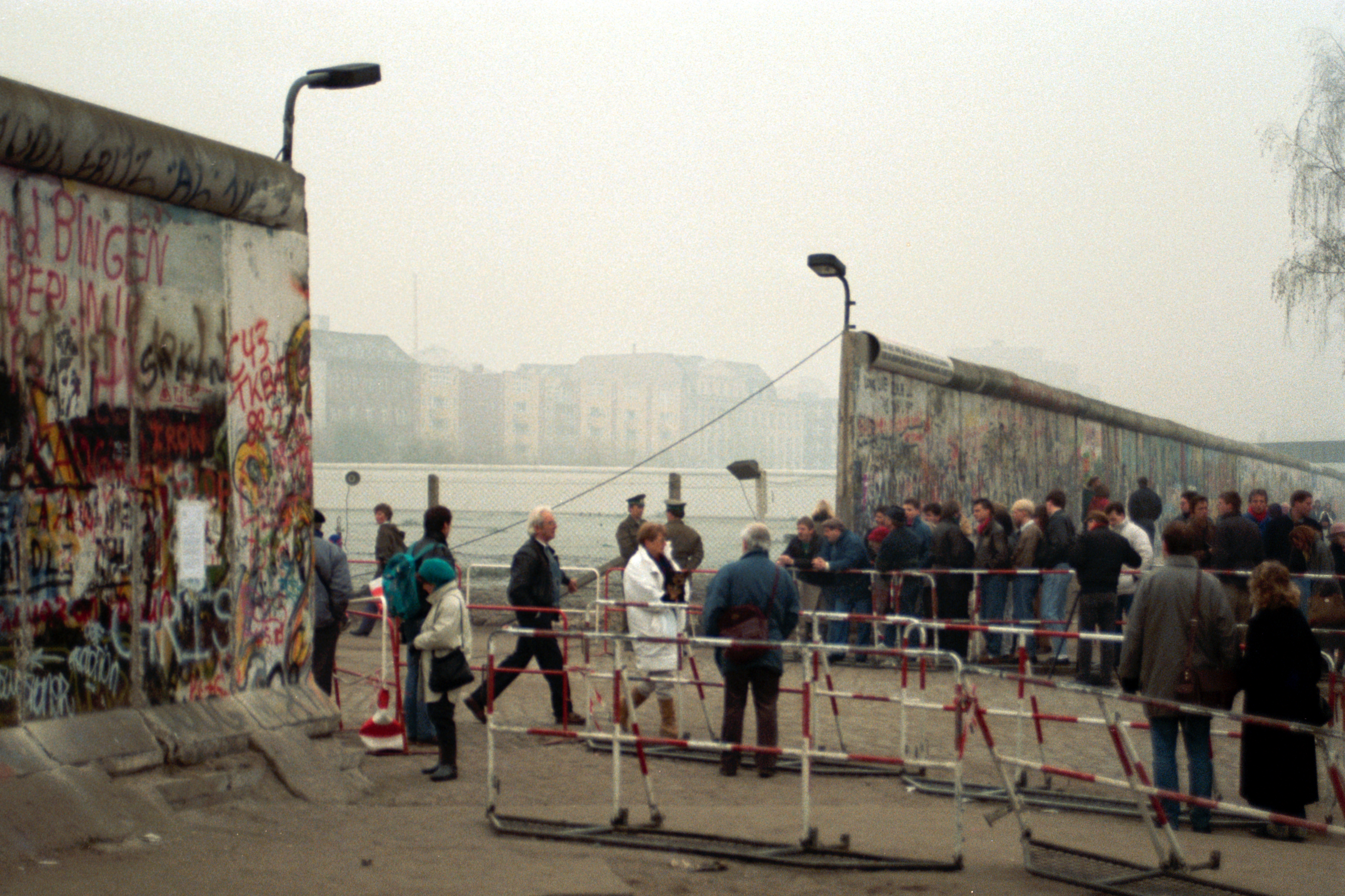
The Potsdamer Platz crossing, seen here from the west into East Berlin, opened days after the first breach of the Berlin Wall in November 1989.

After the initial opening of the Berlin Wall on 9 November 1989, Potsdamer Platz became one of the earliest locations where the Wall was "breached" to create a new border crossing between East and West Berlin. The crossing began operating on 11 November 1989.

The crossing required the dismantling of both the inner and outer walls and the clearance of the death zone or no man's land between the two. A temporary road, lined with barriers, was created across this zone and checkpoints were set up just inside East German territory. Proper dismantling of the entire wall began on 13 June 1990, and all border checks were abolished on 1 July 1990 as East Germany joined West Germany in a currency union.

=== Roger Waters' The Wall concert ===
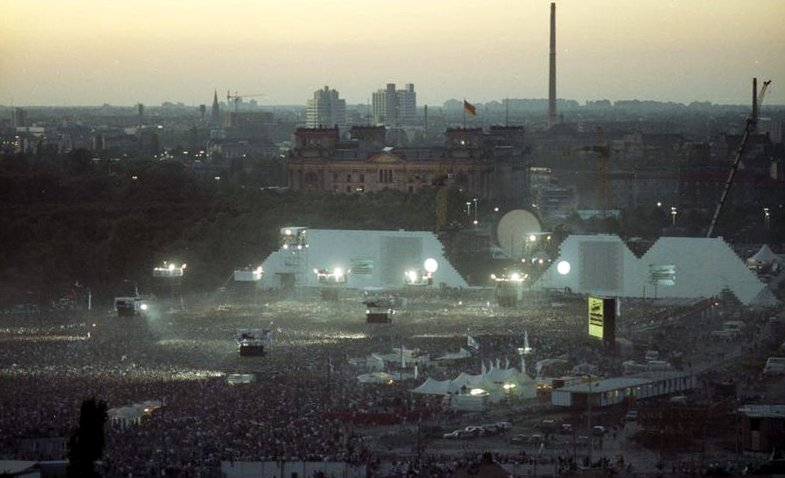
The Wall – Live in Berlin performance in the former no man's land of Potsdamer Platz

The 1990 concert arena overlaid on a 2024 map. ‡ = stage.

On 21 July 1990, ex-Pink Floyd member Roger Waters staged a gigantic charity concert of his former band's rock extravaganza The Wall to commemorate the end of the division between East and West Germany. The concert took place at Potsdamer Platz – specifically an area of the former no man's land just to the north of the Reich Chancellery site, and featured many guest superstars. It was preparations for this concert, rather than historical interest, that brought about the first detailed post-Cold War survey of the area with a view to determining what, if anything, was left of Hitler's bunker and any other underground installations. Although sections of the main Führerbunker were found, partially destroyed or filled in, another bunker complex was found further north that even the East German authorities had apparently missed, plus other cavities beneath land bordering the east side of Ebertstraße, although these turned out to be underground garages belonging to a former SS accommodation block.

=== Routes through Potsdamer Platz after reunification ===
After major refurbishment, the S-Bahn line and station reopened on 1 March 1992, followed by the U-Bahn on 13 November 1993. An additional station on the U-Bahn, called Mendelssohn-Bartholdy-Park, was opened immediately north of the Landwehrkanal on 1 October 1998. A new U-Bahn station has also been built at Potsdamer Platz itself, although a decision is still pending on whether to proceed with completion of the line passing through it; in the meantime the station area serves as an impromptu art gallery and exhibition space. A new underground main-line station or Regionalbahnhof (Bahnhof Potsdamer Platz) has also been constructed, opened on 26 July 2006. There are also plans to reintroduce trams to Potsdamer Platz. In addition, many bus routes pass through the platz, while for people with their own cars there are some 5,000 parking spaces, 3,500 of which are underground.

The annual Berlin Marathon, which takes place in the last weekend of September, was first held in 1974 but due to the division of the city was confined to West Berlin up till and including 1989. Beginning in 1990 the course was re-routed into part of East Berlin, and in 2001 a further adjustment meant that the course has since run through Potsdamer Platz. Typically the leaders will pass through the platz about ten minutes before they cross the finish line.

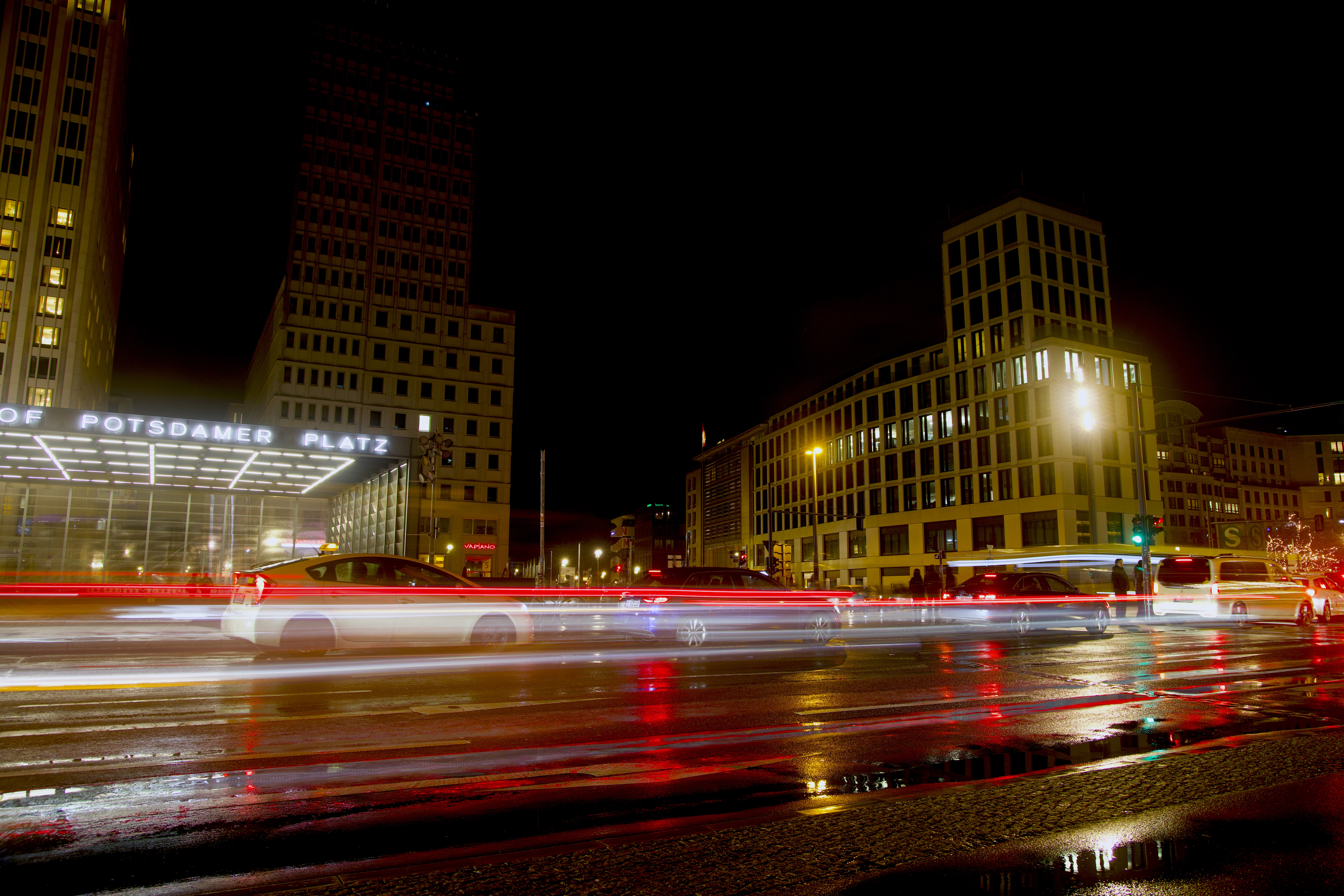
Potsdamer Platz at night 2023

Another annual tradition that began in West Berlin (in 1952) and was re-routed into the east via Potsdamer Platz following German reunification is the Weihnachtszug (Christmas train). It now does a regular two-hour round trip at weekends in the run-up to Christmas for families with children, starting and finishing at the Potsdamer Platz S-Bahn station. It did not run in 2009 or 2010 due to equipment problems, but is expected to be operational again in 2011.

== Europe's largest building site ==
After 1990, the square became the focus of attention again, as a 60 hectares, location which had suddenly become available in the centre of a major European city. A lot of more than 720,000 sq ft (67,000 m^{2}) at Potsdamer Platz had been acquired by Daimler-Benz in 1987 as an expression of faith in Berlin; in 1990, adjacent plots were bought by Sony and ABB. The area was seen as an exciting building site in Europe, and the subject of debate amongst architects and planners. If Berlin needed to re-establish itself on the world stage, then Potsdamer Platz was one of the key areas where the city had an opportunity to express itself. More than just a building site, Potsdamer Platz was a statement of intent. In particular, due to its location straddling the erstwhile border between east and west, it was perceived as a "linking element," reconnecting the two-halves of the city in a way that was symbolic as well as physical, helping to heal the historical wounds by providing a new mecca attracting Berliners from both sides of the former divide. Whether fairly or unfairly, a deal was made on the project.

The Berlin Senate (city government) organised a design competition for the redevelopment of Potsdamer Platz and much of the surrounding area. Eventually attracting 17 entrants, a winning design was announced in October 1991, that from the Munich-based architectural firm of Hilmer & Sattler. They had to fight off some stiff competition though, including a last-minute entry by British architect Richard Rogers.

The Berlin Senate then chose to divide the area into four parts, each to be sold to a commercial investor, who then planned new construction according to Hilmer & Sattler's masterplan. During the building phase Potsdamer Platz was the largest building site in Europe. While the resulting development is impressive in its scale and confidence, the quality of its architecture has been praised and criticised in almost equal measure.

=== Daimler ===
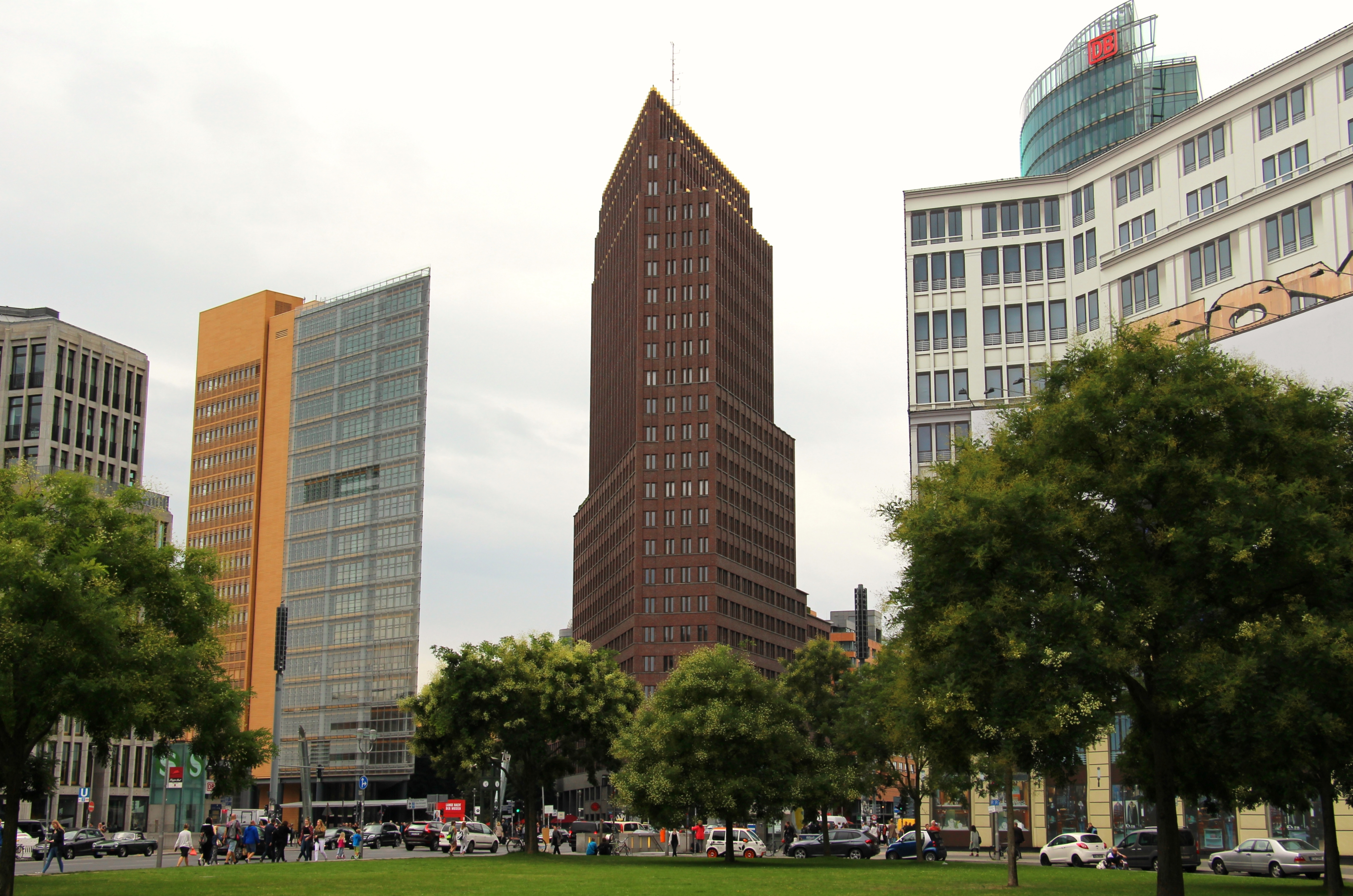
Potsdamer Platz by day

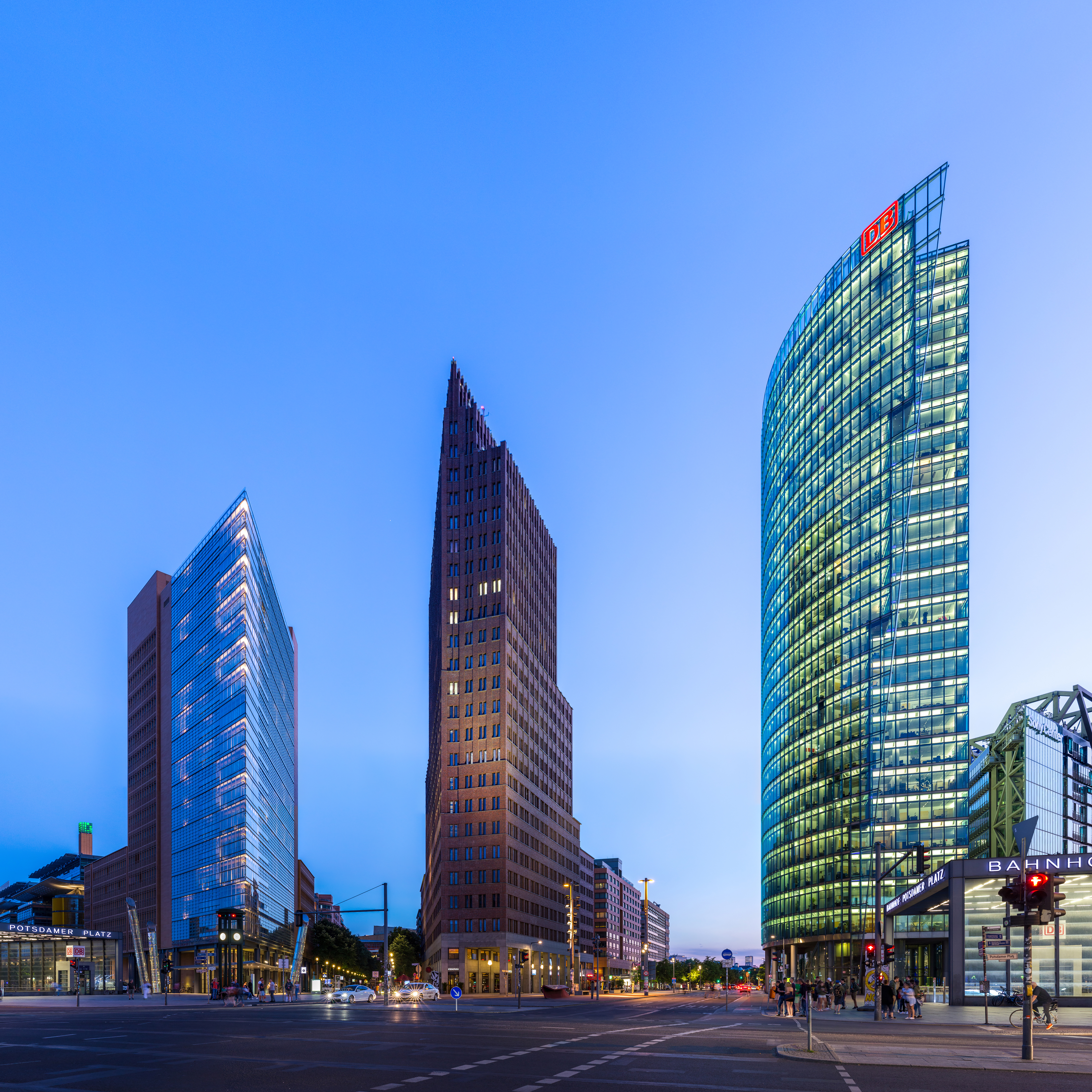
Potsdamer Platz at night

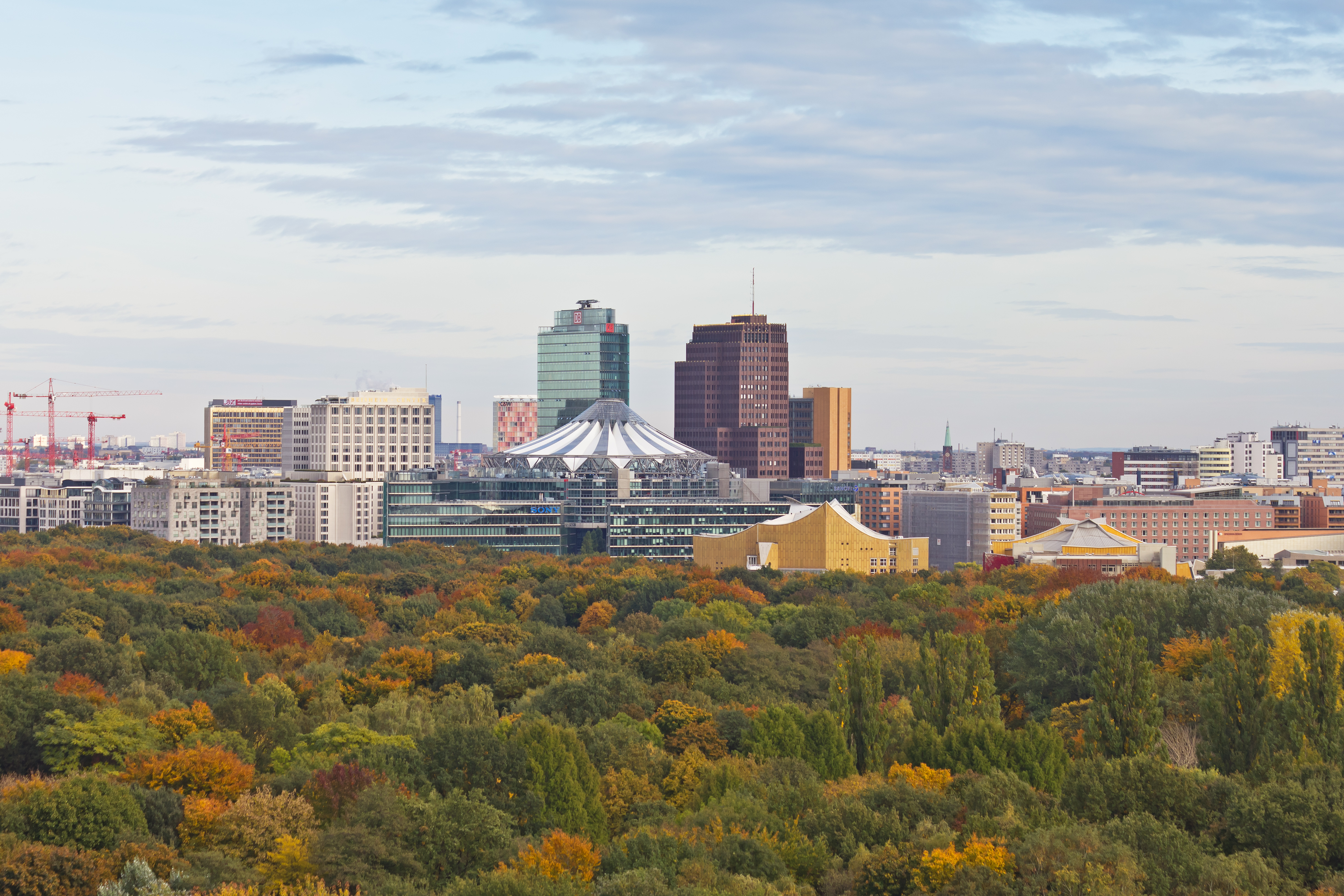
Potsdamer Platz from distance

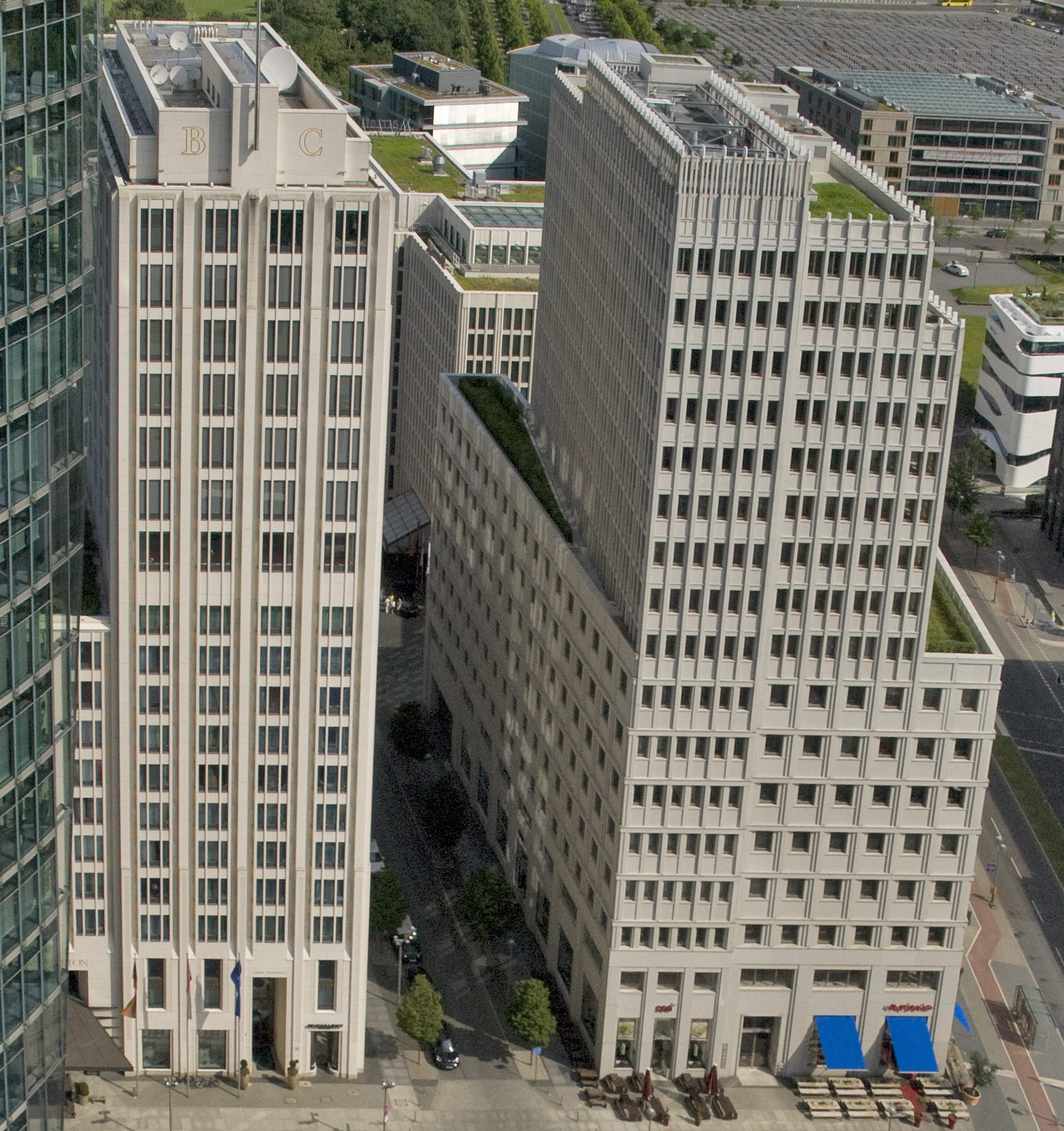
Left Beisheim Centre, right Delbrück-Hochhaus now P5

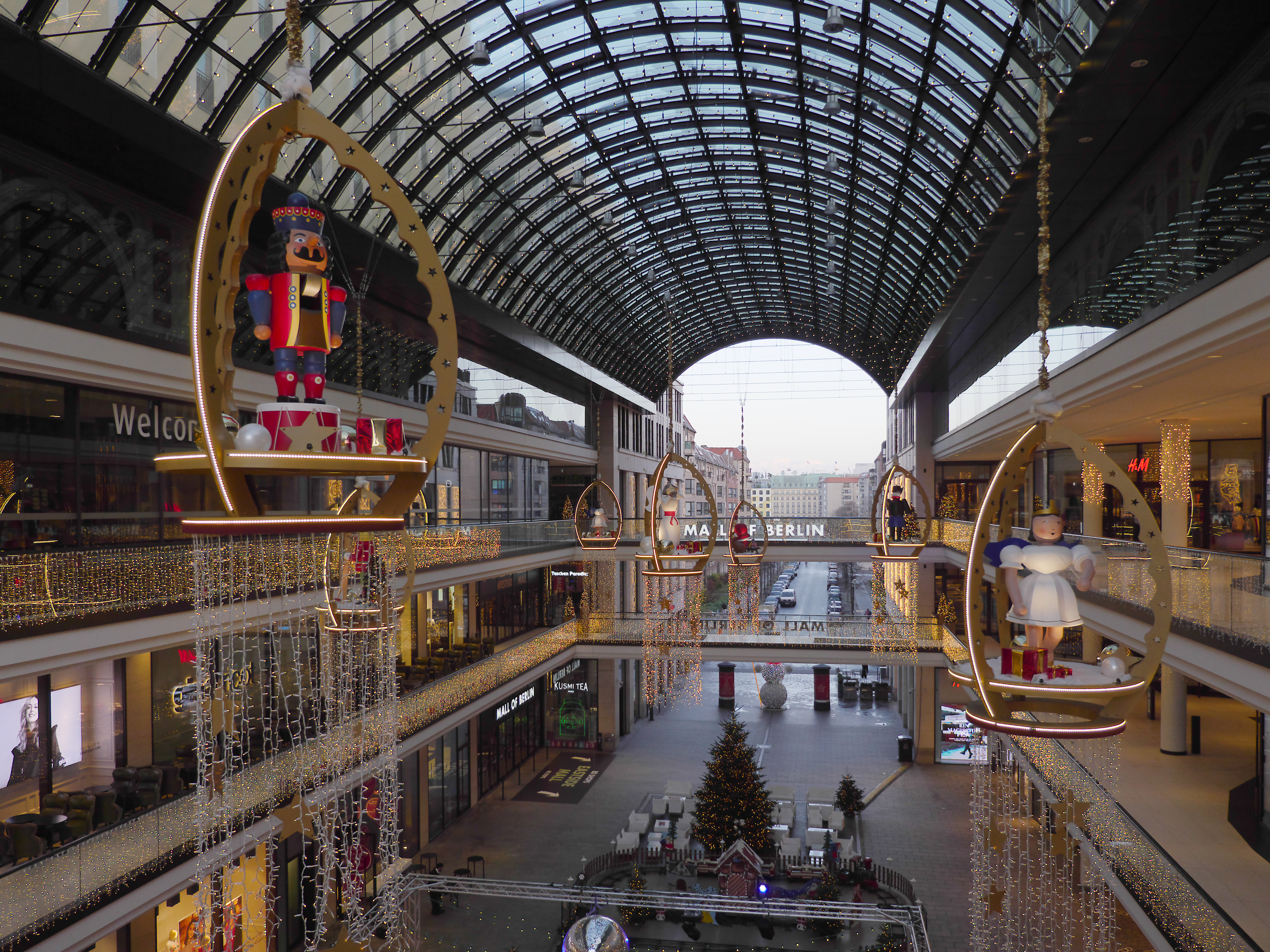
Mall of Berlin at Leipziger Platz

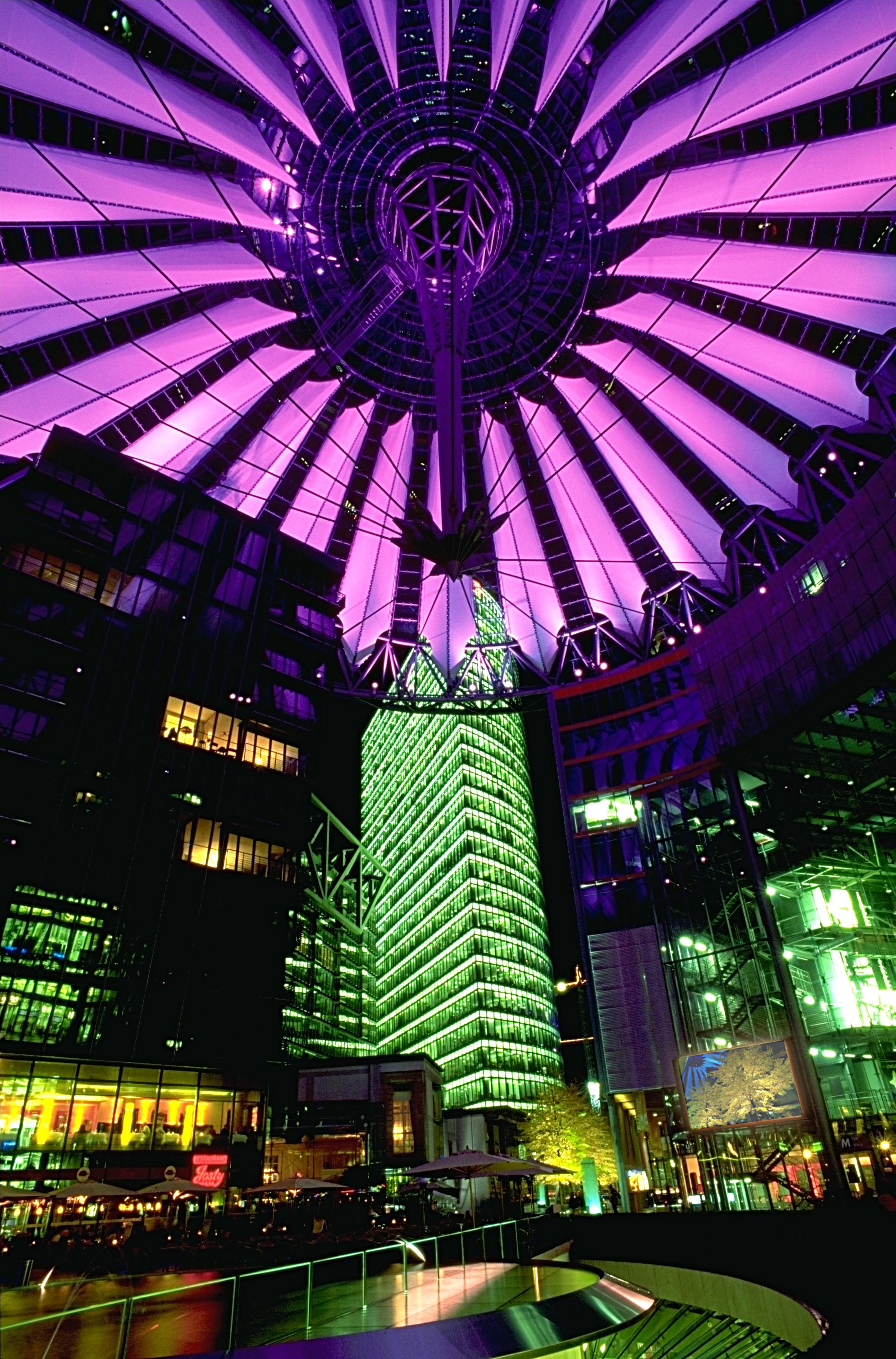
The Sony Center, 2004

The largest of the four parts went to Daimler-Benz, who charged Italian architect Renzo Piano with creating an overall design for their scheme while sticking to the underlying requirements of Hilmer & Sattler's masterplan. A $2 billion development bordering the west side of the former Potsdamer Bahnhof site, some of its 19 individual buildings were then erected by other architects, who submitted their own designs while maintaining Piano's key elements. The primary materials used for the buildings' facades are brick, terra cotta and sandstone, creating hues of beige, soft brown and ocher.

The first spade at the start of the Daimler-Benz development was turned by the Mayor of Berlin, Eberhard Diepgen, on 11 October 1993. During construction, the contractors erected a bright red three-story building called the Info Box, where computer graphics help convey the scope of one of the most complex building projects ever attempted; it quickly became a highly popular attraction with thousands of visitors each week.

The finished complex was officially opened by the Federal President of Germany, Roman Herzog, on 2 October 1998, in a glittering ceremony featuring large-scale celebrations and musical performances. The 19 buildings include the offices of Daimler-Benz themselves (through their former subsidiary debis, whose 21-storey main tower rises to 106 metres and is the tallest building in the new Potsdamer Platz development), also offices of British professional services company PricewaterhouseCoopers; Berliner Volksbank (Germany's largest cooperative bank) by Arata Isozaki; a five-star hotel designed by Rafael Moneo and managed by Hyatt, with 342 rooms and suites; and the 25-storey, 103-metre-high Potsdamer Platz No. 1, known as the Kollhoff Tower by architect Hans Kollhoff.

Potsdamer Platz No. 1 also houses the "Panoramapunkt" viewing platform, located 100 m above ground level, which is accessed by riding Europe's fastest elevator (8.65 metres per second). From the Panoramapunkt one can see such landmarks as the Brandenburg Gate, Reichstag, Federal Chancellery, Bellevue Palace, Cathedral, Television Tower, Gendarmes Market, Holocaust Memorial and Kaiser Wilhelm Memorial Church. The Kollhoff Tower's facade needed major repairs due to water penetration and frost damage just seven years after completion, and was under scaffolding for many months.

The Daimler complex also contains the former Weinhaus Huth, now restored to its former glory and occupied by a restaurant, café, and an exhibition space for Daimler AG's art collection ("Daimler Contemporary"). Across the complex, various artworks from the collection are installed, including pieces by Keith Haring (Untitled (The Boxers)), Mark di Suvero (Galileo), Robert Rauschenberg (The Riding Bikes) and Frank Stella (Prinz Friedrich Arthur von Homburg). From 2000 until 2010, Balloon Flower (Blue) (1995–2000) by Jeff Koons was located at Marlene Dietrich Platz.

=== Sony ===
The second largest part went to Sony, who erected their new European headquarters on a triangular site immediately to the north of Daimler-Benz and separated from it by the re-routed Potsdamer Straße. This new Sony Centre, designed by Helmut Jahn, is an eye-catching monolith of glass and steel featuring an enormous tent-like conical roof, its shape reportedly inspired by Mount Fuji in Japan, covering an elliptical central public space up to 102 metres across, and thus differing substantially from Hilmer & Sattler's original plan for the site. Its 26-storey, 103-metre-high "Bahn Tower" is so named because it houses the corporate headquarters of Deutsche Bahn, the German state railway system.

Surviving parts of the former Hotel Esplanade have been incorporated into the north side of the Sony development, including the Kaisersaal which, in a complex and costly operation in March 1996, was moved in one piece (all 1,300 tonnes of it), some 75 metres from its former location, to the spot that it occupies today (it even had to make two right-angled turns during the journey, while maintaining its own orientation). Nearby is a new Café Josty, opened early in 2001, while between the two is "Josty's Bar," which is housed in the Esplanade's former breakfast room. This, like the Kaisersaal, had to be relocated, but here the room was dismantled into some 500 pieces to be reassembled where it stands now.

Topped out on 2 September 1998, the Sony Centre was formally opened on 14 June 2000 (although many of its public attractions had been up and running since 20 January), in another grand ceremony with more music – this time with Sony's Japanese chairman Norio Ohga himself conducting the Berlin Philharmonic Orchestra. A keen lover of classical music, he had helped to choose the site because of its close proximity to the orchestra's home in the Cultural Forum.

=== Beisheim ===
The third part became the Beisheim Centre and adjoining buildings, on another triangular site bordered on the east side by Ebertstraße, financed entirely out of his own pocket by the German businessman Otto Beisheim. The office and shopping complex also houses the five-star Ritz Carlton and Marriott hotels.

=== Park Kolonnaden ===
The fourth part is the Park Kolonnaden, a range of buildings running down the east side of the Potsdamer Bahnhof site, parallelling Daimler-Benz. This complex occupies the site of the former Haus Vaterland, and its principal building, which for a few years was the headquarters of the large German trade union ver.di (Vereinte Dienstleistungsgewerkschaft, meaning United Services Union), rises to 45 metres and has a curving glass facade designed to evoke the shape of that erstwhile landmark.

=== Leipziger Platz ===
Other developments, more piecemeal in nature, have recreated the octagonal layout of neighbouring Leipziger Platz immediately to the east. One of these is Kanada Haus, the new embassy of Canada, on the platz's north-west diagonal. Its turf-cutting ceremony was carried out on 18 February 2002 by the Canadian Prime Minister, Jean Chrétien, and it was officially opened on 29 April 2005.

=== Controversy ===
The whole project was subject to much controversy from the start; not everyone approved of how the district was commercialised and replanned. The decision by the Berlin Senate to divide the land between just four investors – while numerous others had submitted bids – provoked scepticism. The remarkably low price Daimler-Benz paid to secure their plot prompted questions from the Berlin Auditor-General's office and the European Union in Brussels, which resulted in Daimler-Benz being billed an additional sum. There were wrangles over land-usage: although a central feature of the Daimler-Benz development is a top shopping mall – the Arkaden (Arcades), this did not form part of the plans until the Berlin Senate belatedly insisted that a shopping mall be included. Despite its undoubted success, this in turn led to what many saw as an "Americanisation" of the area, with even its private security force being kitted out in something resembling New York Police uniforms.

Further wrangles effectively brought work on the north side of Leipziger Platz to a complete stop for several years; even now there are some "fake facades" where completed new buildings should be, while a long-running dispute over who owned the Wertheim department store site (or had claims to the revenue from its sale by the government), left another large gap in the central Berlin cityscape that is only now finally being redeveloped. This development, known as Leipziger Platz 12, is a large complex with facades in three streets (Leipziger Strasse, Wilhelmstrasse and Vossstrasse) as well as Leipziger Platz itself, and when completed will contain 270 stores, 270 apartments, a hotel, a fitness centre and offices. However, this development brought about the demise (after several stays of execution), of the legendary Tresor nightclub and centre for techno music. Founded on 8 March 1991 in the basement strongrooms of the former Wertheim store's bank, these having survived the decades largely undamaged, the club finally closed on 16 April 2005 (it reopened on 24 May 2007 in a renovated power plant on Köpenicker Straße).

== Facilities and attractions ==
The rebuilt Potsdamer Platz now attracts around 70,000 visitors a day, rising to 100,000 at weekends. It is a particularly popular attraction for visitors: the "Arkaden" shopping mall is 180 m (590 ft) in length. There are also four major hotels and a casino, the Spielbank Berlin.

=== Film and theatre ===
The Theater am Potsdamer Platz is a theatre for musicals seating over 1600 people. It is known as the Berlinale Palast during the Berlin International Film Festival, serving as the venue for the premieres of competition films and several special gala films, as well as the opening and awards ceremonies.

The CinemaxX Potsdamer Platz is a multiplex cinema containing 19 screens and seating up to 3,500 people. It has been the main Berlinale screening cinema since 2000, two years after its opening in 1998.

Since 2000, the two Potsdamer Platz venues have served as the two principal venues of the festival.

=== Newer buildings ===
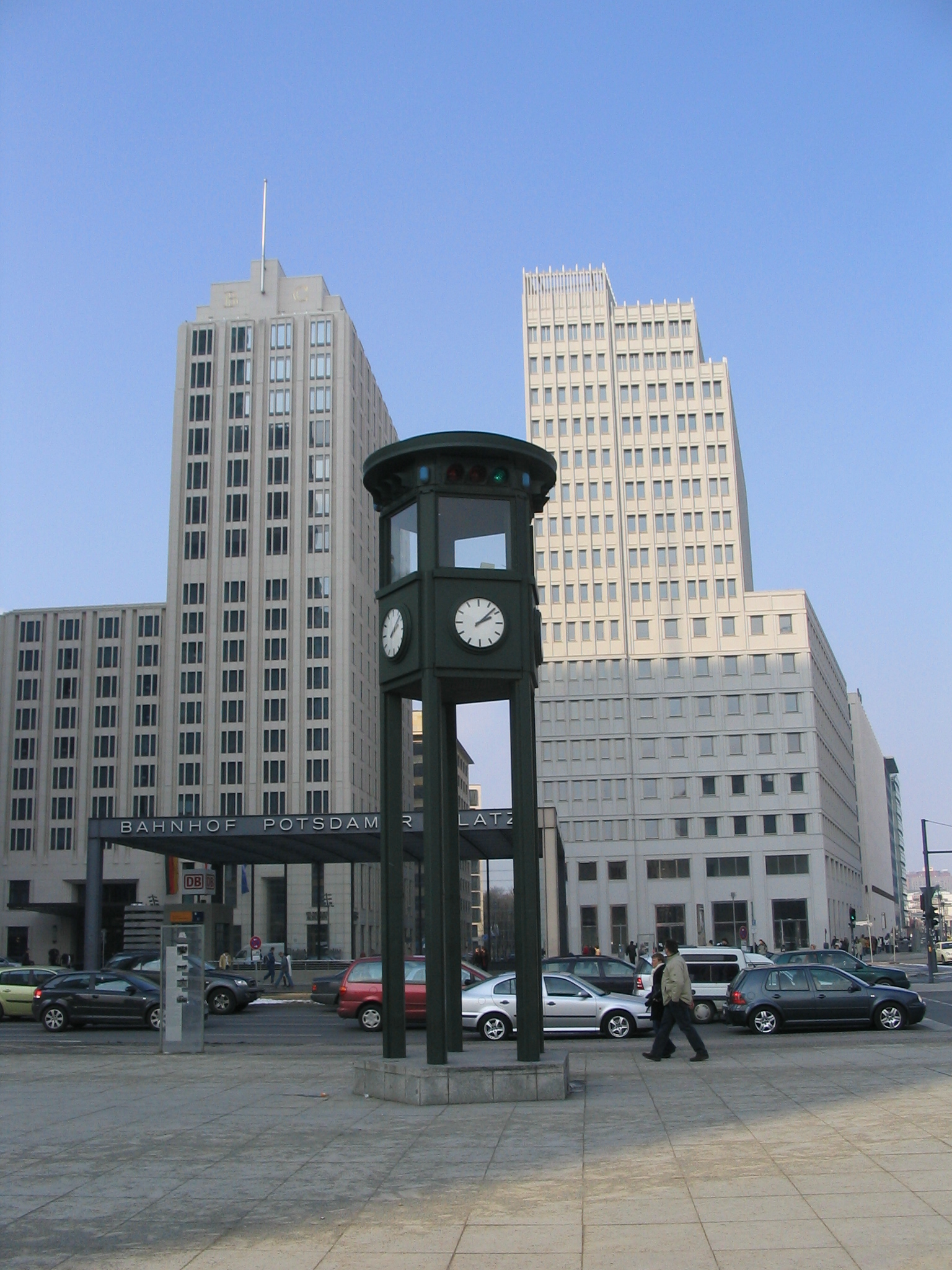
Potsdamer Platz (2005); In background left Beisheim Centre, right Delbrück-Hochhaus now P5

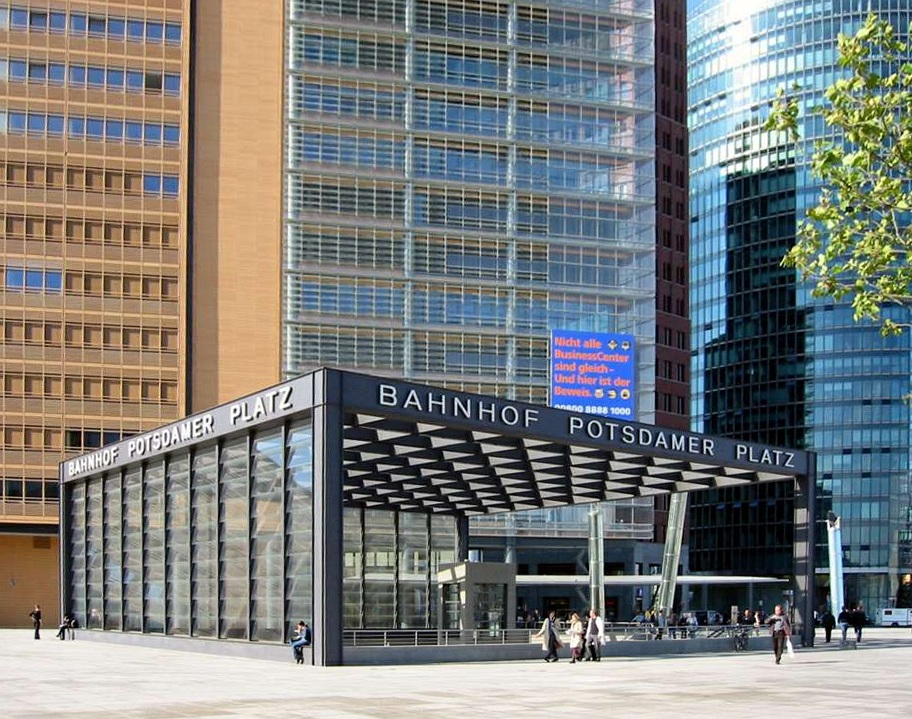
Bahnhof Potsdamer Platz entrance hall (2005)

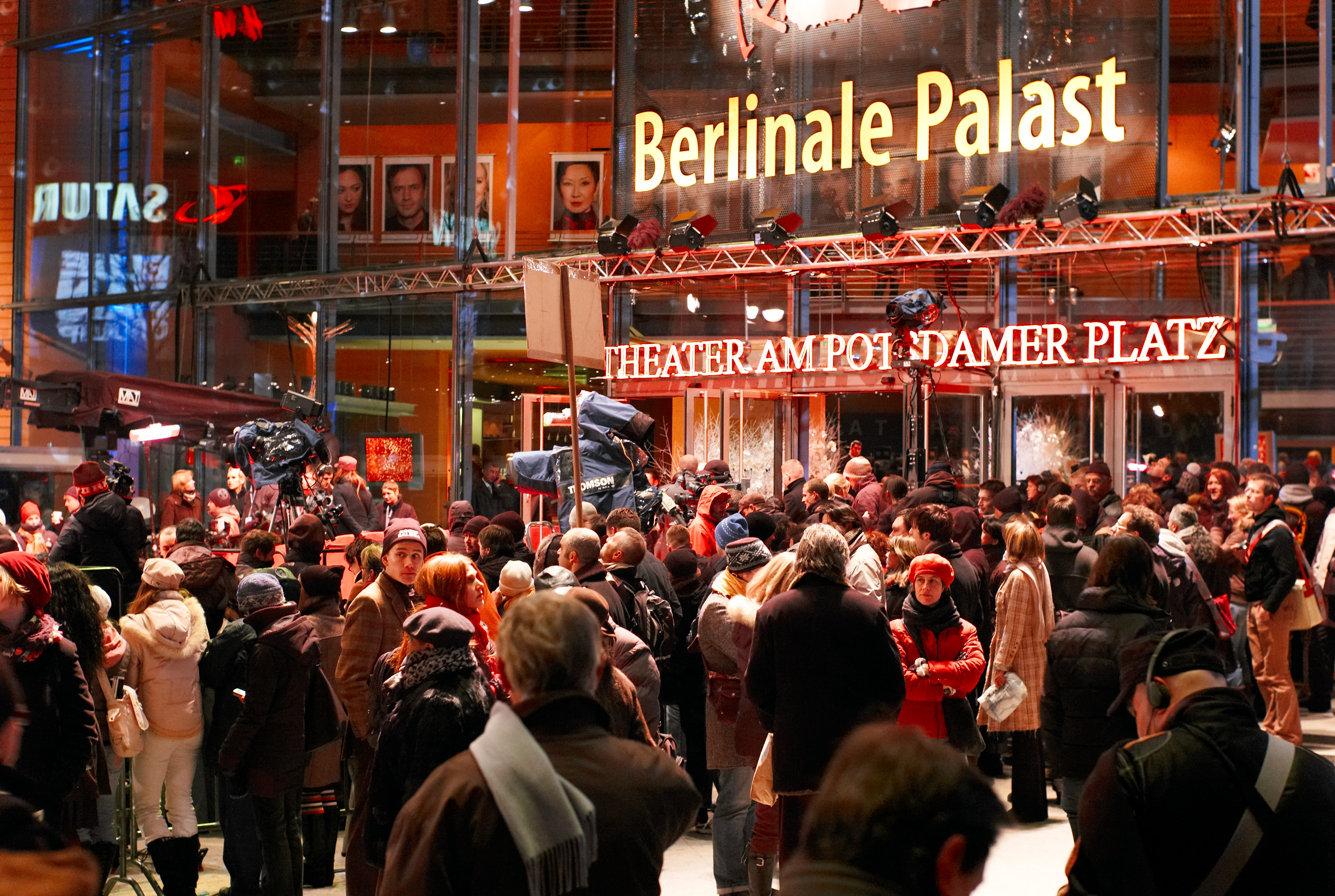
Berlinale Palast, 2007

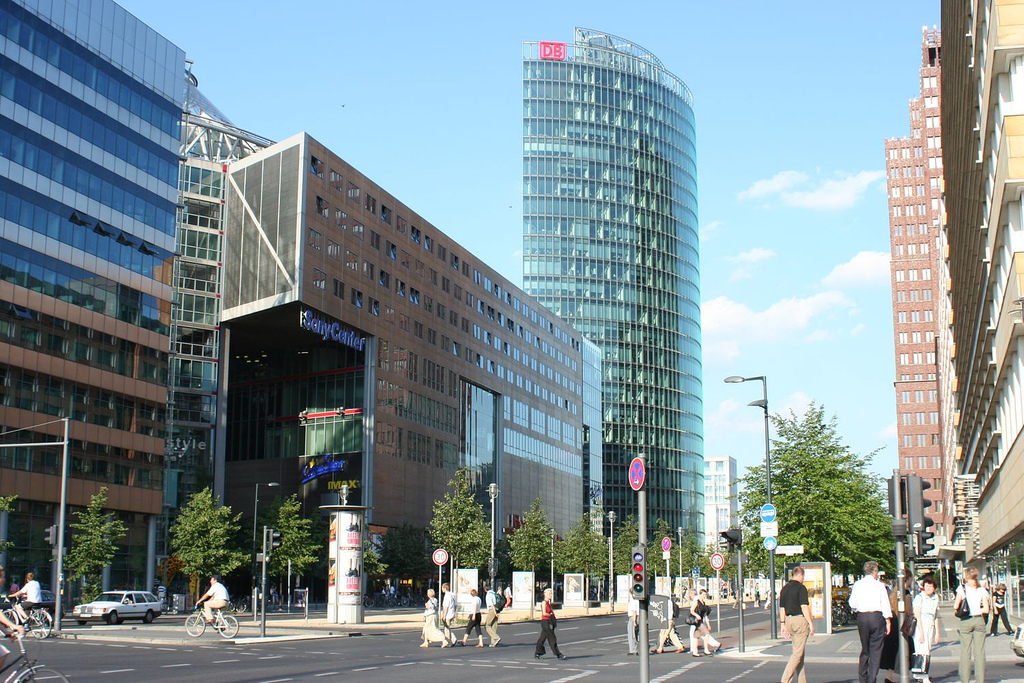
Potsdamer Platz: Sony Centre and Bahn Tower (2007)

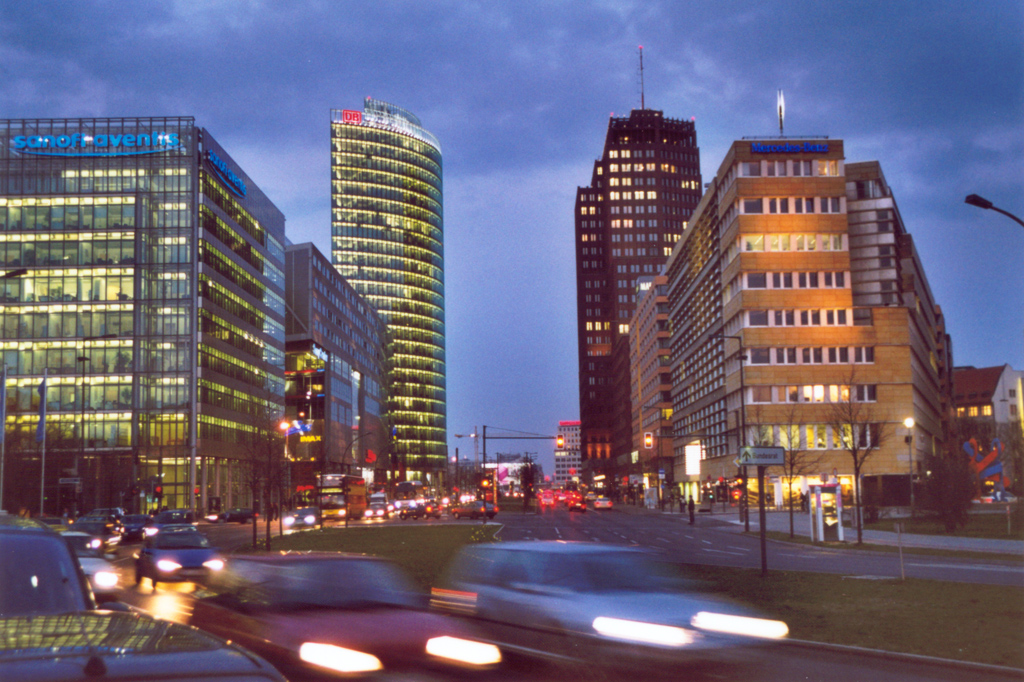
New Potsdamer Strasse towards P. Platz (2007; Bahn Tower left, Kollhoff Tower rhs)

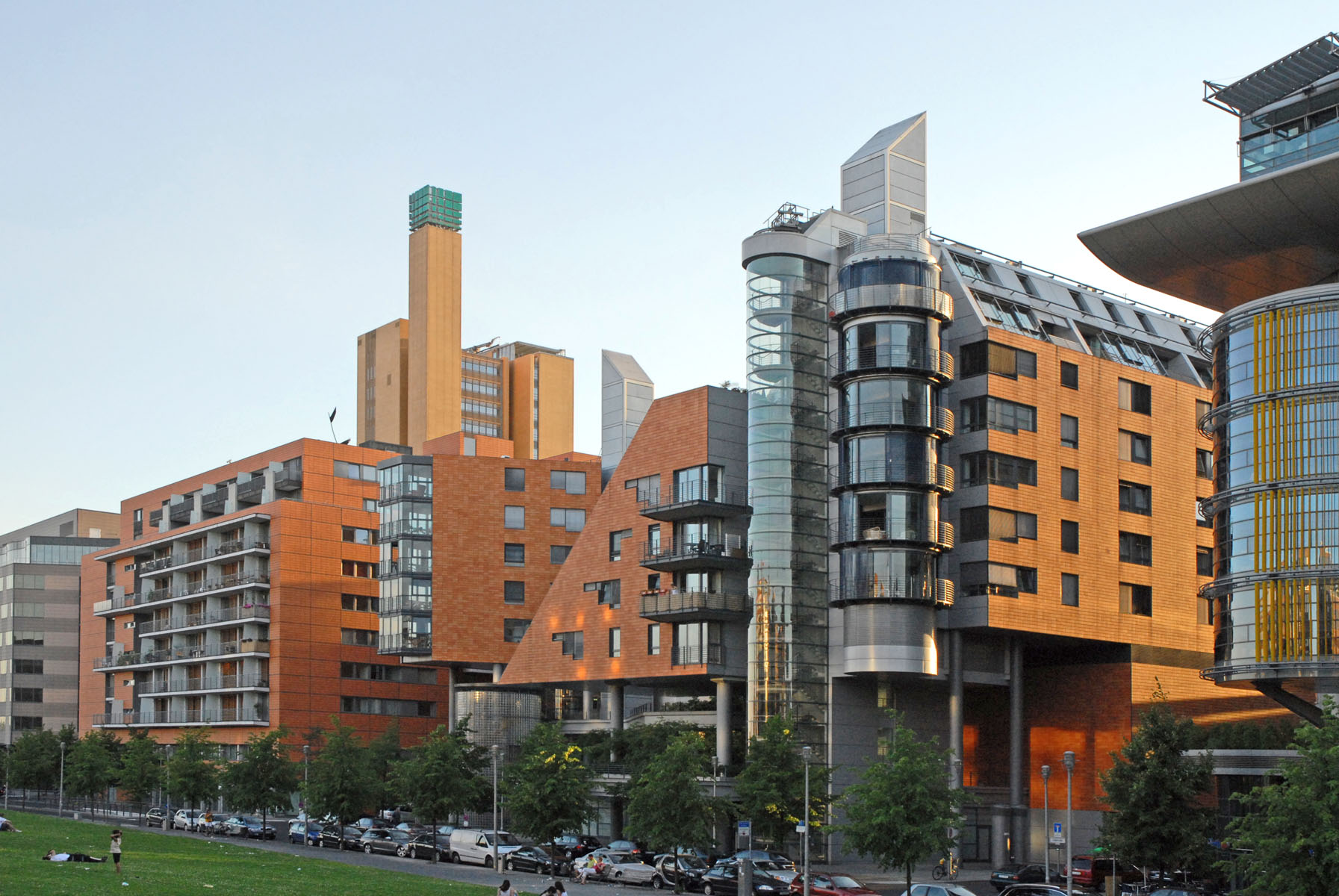
Residential building by Richard Rogers (2008)

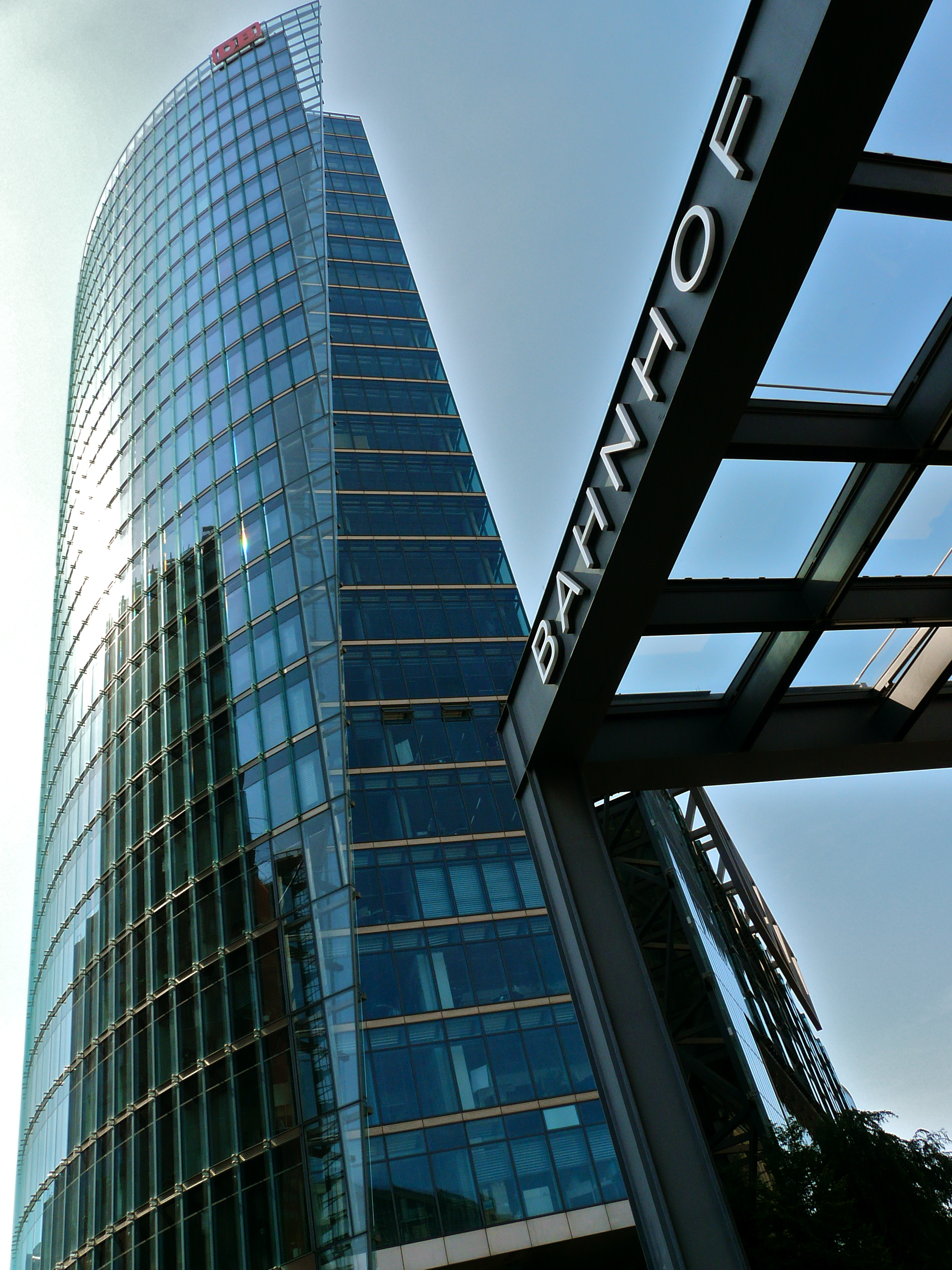
Sony Centre's Bahn Tower (2009)

== Future ==
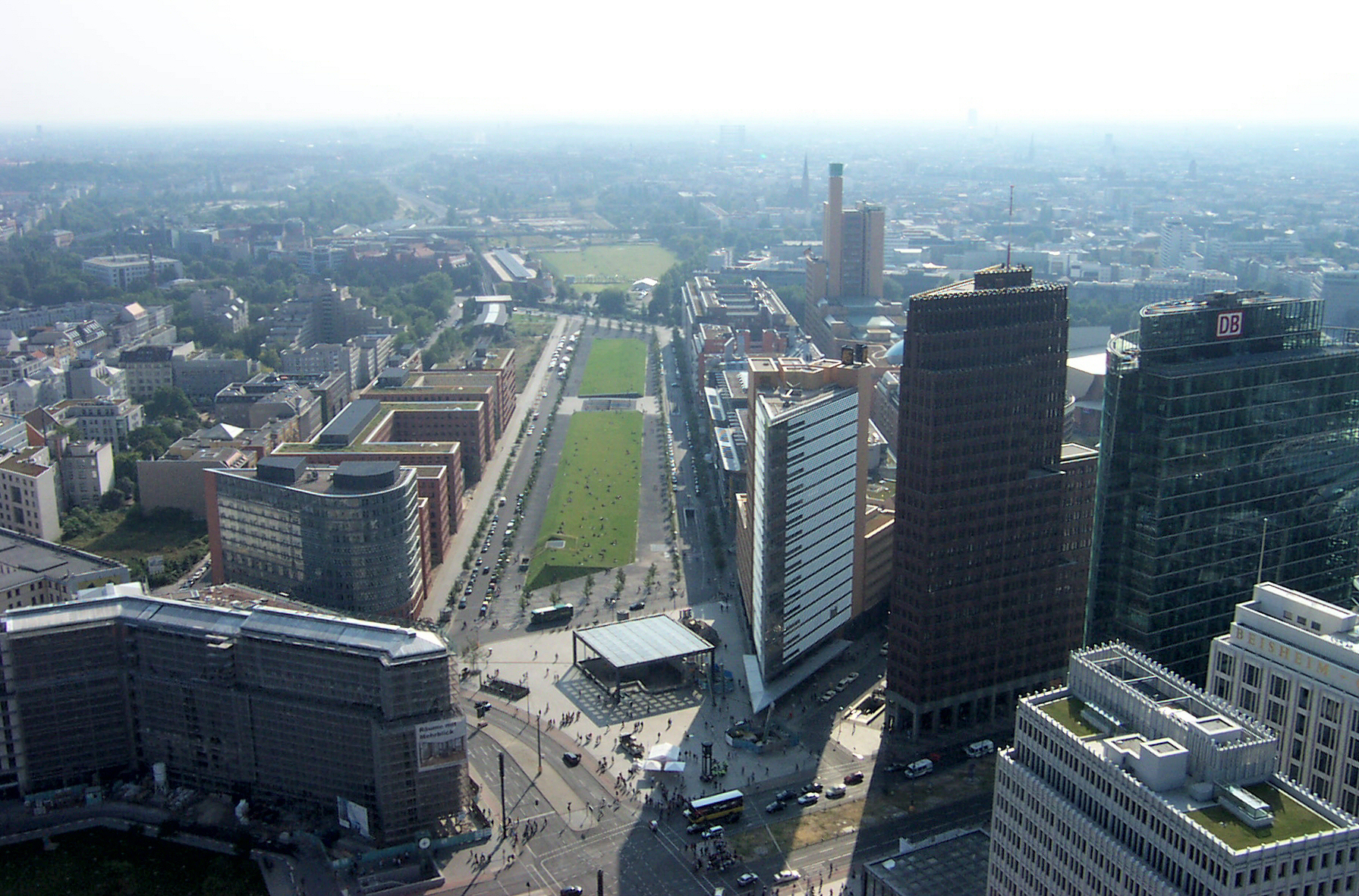
Looking south over Potsdamer Platz in September 2005. The long green strip is Tilla Durieux Park, the site of the former Potsdamer Bahnhof and its approaches. The Park Kolonnaden development is on its left (eastern) side, while the Daimler development parallels it down the right (west) side. In the left foreground is Leipziger Platz, while in the right foreground are parts of the Sony and Beisheim Centers.

Whilst on the surface the new Potsdamer Platz appears so far to have lived up to its expectations as a futuristic centre of commerce at the heart of Europe's youngest capital city, there has been much debate as to just how successful it really is. Certainly its long-term success and viability have become much harder to judge since the recent worldwide economic downturn, a situation compounded by the actions of its two principal owner-occupiers. Daimler and Sony caused a major surprise on 2 October 2007 when both announced that they were putting their respective complexes at Potsdamer Platz on the market. Whilst neither intended to move out, both felt it preferable to rent the space from new owners rather than continue to be the owners themselves (and so be responsible for the buildings' upkeep and maintenance). Daimler had recently come through a painful separation from their former American subsidiary Chrysler and needed a quick injection of cash in order to refocus on automotive production. The announcement came on the ninth anniversary of their complex's official opening, a fact not lost on many people. Sony meanwhile, put their decision down to a need to review their global strategy in the face of a fast-changing worldwide economic climate.

On 17 December 2007, Daimler announced that they were selling their entire complex of 19 buildings at Potsdamer Platz to SEB Asset Management, a Frankfurt-based subsidiary of the Swedish banking group SEB. On 28 February 2008, Sony made a similar announcement, of impending sale to a consortium led by American investment banking giant (now bank holding company) Morgan Stanley. Both deals were finalised by the end of March 2008. Whilst the amounts involved have not been publicly disclosed, it is believed that neither Daimler nor Sony recouped all of their original investments (what Daimler managed to get was reportedly well short).

The development is a commercial success at street level. The numbers of shoppers visiting the Arkaden, guests passing through the doors of the many bars, cafes and restaurants, theatres and cinemas, hotels and casino (not to mention passengers thronging the platforms of the stations), all point to a thriving focal point right at the very heart of Berlin. Detractors however, may draw attention to the floors above and point out the high percentage of office and residential space that allegedly still stands empty more than a decade after its completion. Although examples of "over-provision" like this can be found all over Berlin, it is Potsdamer Platz that, rightly or wrongly, has been used to highlight the problem.

The other major sticking point, which is reportedly causing concern at government level, is that the majority of people going to Potsdamer Platz are visitors to the city, implying that the original vision of the development as a linking element attracting Berliners themselves, and Berliners from both sides of the former divide, has not really materialised. There are criticisms that the development does not sit easily with or connect with its surroundings, and as a result Berliners have had difficulty accepting it as theirs (despite the fact that the choice of Hilmer & Sattler's masterplan was partly because it was the only one to address the way the development juxtaposed with the Cultural Forum immediately to the west, although the Cultural Forum has itself faced similar criticisms of its own). Another, more psychological factor that has played a part here is that a long-standing mutual distrust or antipathy felt between former East Berliners and West Berliners (Ossis and Wessis according to the well-known slang terms), is still very much in evidence in the city and elsewhere in Germany, and bold civil engineering projects and architectural statements are not going to make it go away by themselves. Politicians past and present have been accused of short-sightedness in speculating that they would.

It was feared that the economic downturn might exacerbate all these problems. On the whole, however, Potsdamer Platz seems to have weathered the storm. Meanwhile, Deutsche Bahn AG were due to relocate to a purpose-built new structure at Berlin's new main train station (Berlin Hauptbahnhof), when the lease on the Sony Center's Bahn Tower expired in 2010. However, in April 2008 Deutsche Bahn announced that they were seeking to extend the lease on the Bahn Tower by another three years. This deal was finalised in late 2009. Since then the lease has been extended to 15 years.

== Transport ==
Before World War II, Potsdamer Platz had much streetcar traffic. The last remnants were removed in 1991.

Unlike, for example, Friedrichstrasse station, Potsdamer Platz is not a really important intersection point for the U and S-Bahn system. However, due to its location on the north–south route to the main station, parallel to the aboveground buildings, it was also connected to the regional traffic with a tunnel station. Regional trains of the DB and the ODEG, the S-Bahn (north–south tunnel) and the U2 underground line currently stop at Potsdamer Platz regional train station. Via numerous bus lines, the course can also be reached. In the medium term, a tram connection through the Leipziger Strasse is planned, which can be supplemented or even replaced by the long-planned U3 underground line. In the north–south direction, another S-Bahn line (planning name: S21), in particular for better public transport development of the main station, to be built in the long term. Since upgrades on the Berlin Dresden railway, the airport express (FEX) runs via Potsdamer Platz. The planned rebuild of the trunk line will reconnect Potsdamer Platz with Potsdam.

Essentially, four major roads, in the east–west direction, Potsdamer Strasse and Leipziger Strasse, and in the north–south direction, Ebertstrasse and Stresemannstrasse, lead traffic to Potsdamer Platz. Smaller streets within the individual quarters provide for the connection of the underground parking garages. In addition, in 2006, a connection between the Uferstraße on the Landwehrkanal and the main tunnel was put into operation, the Tunnel Tiergarten Spreebogen is part of the Bundesstrasse 96.

On 2 March 2008, a statue by the Berlin artist Alexander Polzin dedicated to Italian philosopher, priest, cosmologist, and occultist Giordano Bruno (1548–1600), was erected inside one of the entrances to the Potsdamer Platz Regionalbahnhof.

== See also ==
- 80000 Shots, 2002 German film
- List of tourist attractions in Berlin

== Sources ==
- Tony le Tissier: Berlin Then and Now, 1992, After the Battle Publishers, ISBN 0-900913-72-X
- Peter Fritzsche, Karen Hewitt: Berlinwalks, 1994, Boxtree Limited Publishers, ISBN 0-7522-1602-3
- Jack Holland, John Gawthrop: Berlin – The Rough Guide, 1995, Rough Guides Limited Publishers, ISBN 1-85828-129-6
- Ulrike Plewina, Horst Mauter, Laszlo F. Foldenyi, Ulrich Pfeiffer, Alfred Kernd'l, Thies Schroder: Potsdamer Platz – A History in Words and Pictures, 1996, Dirk Nishen Verlag, ISBN 3-88940-334-4
- Raimund Hertzsch: The Potsdamer Platz around 1930 (Number 184 from the series Der Historische Ort), 1998, Kai Homilius Verlag, ISBN 3-89706-993-8
- Mark R. McGee: Berlin 1925-1946-2000, 2000, Nicolai'sche Verlag, ISBN 3-87584-901-9
- Fodor's Germany 2002, 2001, Fodor's Travel, ISBN 0-679-00875-6
- Yamin von Rauch, Jochen Visscher: Potsdamer Platz – Urban Architecture for a New Berlin, 2002, Jovis Verlag, ISBN 3-931321-95-9
- Eric D. Weitz: Weimar Germany, 2007, Princeton University Press, ISBN 0-691-01695-X
