= List of hotels in Germany =

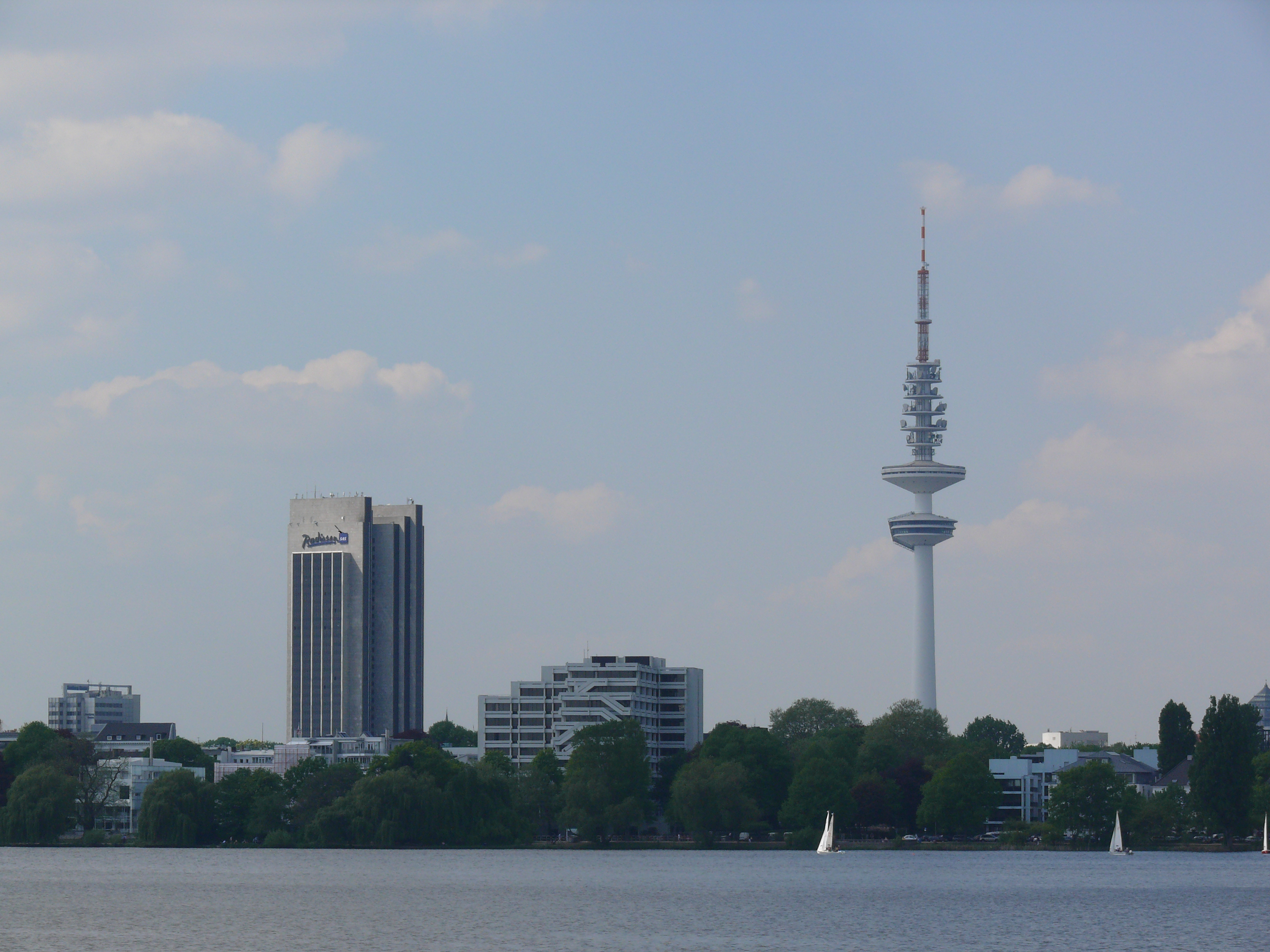
The Radisson Blu Hotel Hamburg on the left, next to the Heinrich-Hertz-Turm

This is a list of notable hotels in Germany.

== Hotels in Germany ==
- Atlantis House
- Breidenbacher Hof, Düsseldorf
- Cecilienhof, Potsdam
- Dom-Hotel, Cologne
- Edelweiss Lodge and Resort, Garmisch-Partenkirchen
- Edelweiss Vacation Village and Campground
- Eh'häusl
- Excelsior Hotel Ernst, Cologne
- General Walker Hotel, Obersalzberg (defunct)
- Grand Hotel Heiligendamm, Heiligendamm
- Gut Weißenhaus
- Hotel Atlantic Kempinski, Hamburg
- Hotel Nassauer Hof
- Hotel Nikko Düsseldorf, Düsseldorf
- Hotel Petersberg, Near Bonn
- Hotel Vier Jahreszeiten Kempinski
- Hotel Waldkater
- Kempinski Hotel Falkenstein
- Meisdorf House, Meisdorf
- Palasthotel (defunct)
- Propeller Island City Lodge
- Prora (defunct)
- Radisson Blu Hotel, Hamburg
- Ringberghaus, Suhl
- Schloss Elmau
- Schloss Wolfsbrunn
- Schlosshotel Kronberg, Kronberg im Taunus
- St Petrus House
- Staffelter Hof
- Steigenberger Parkhotel Düsseldorf, Düsseldorf
- Taschenbergpalais, Dresden
- Zum Roten Bären, Freiburg
- Zum Schwan
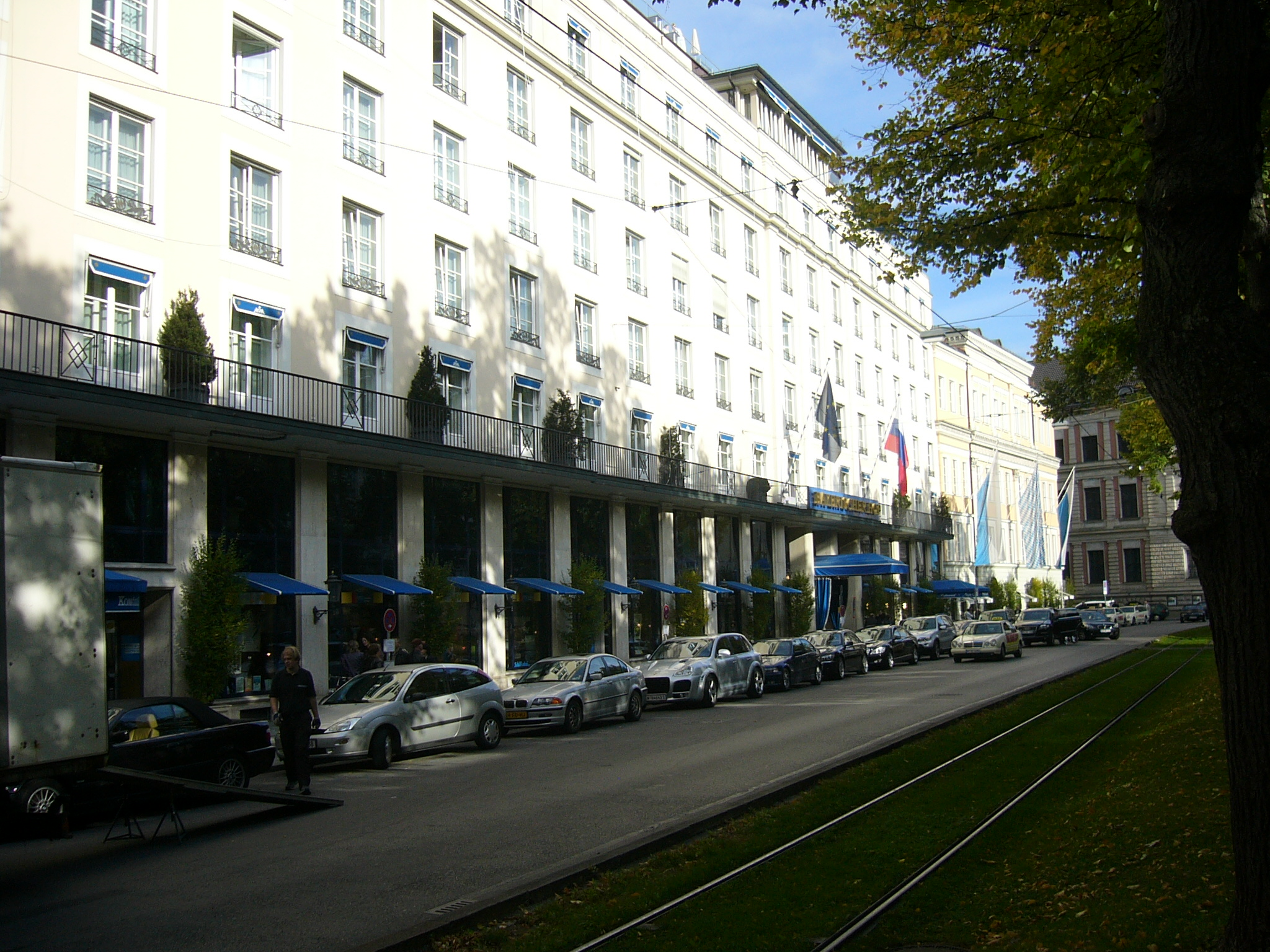
Hotel Bayerischer Hof

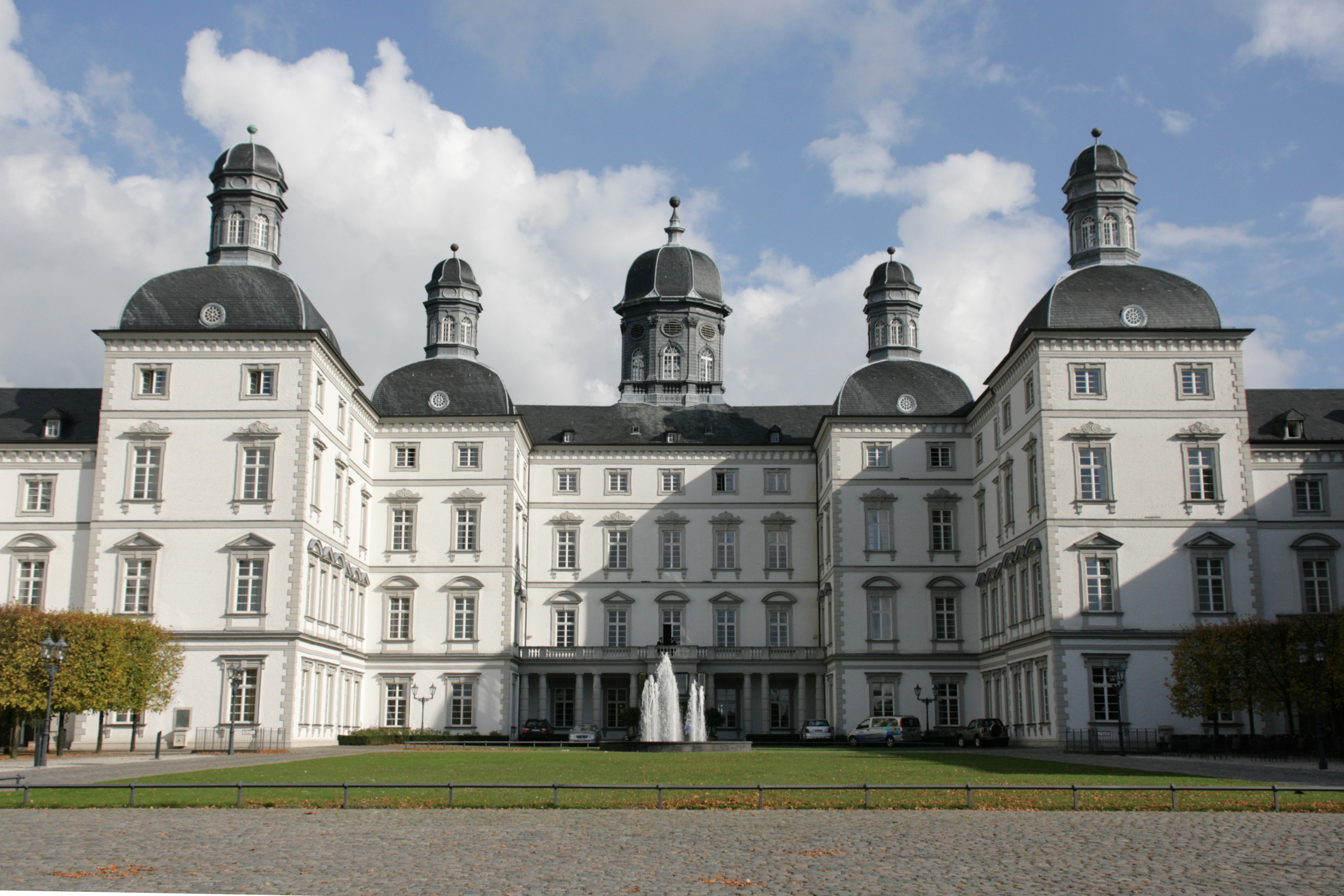
Schloss Bensberg

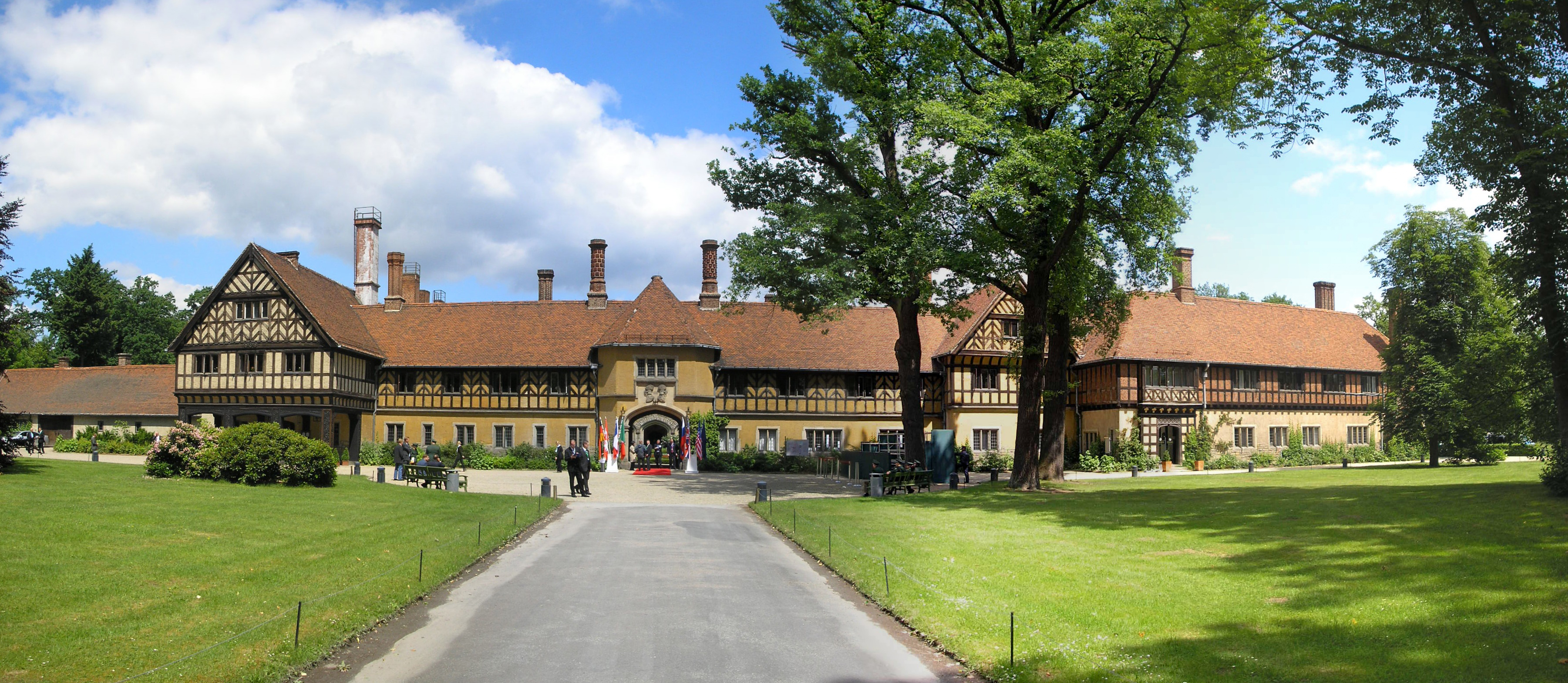
Cecilienhof

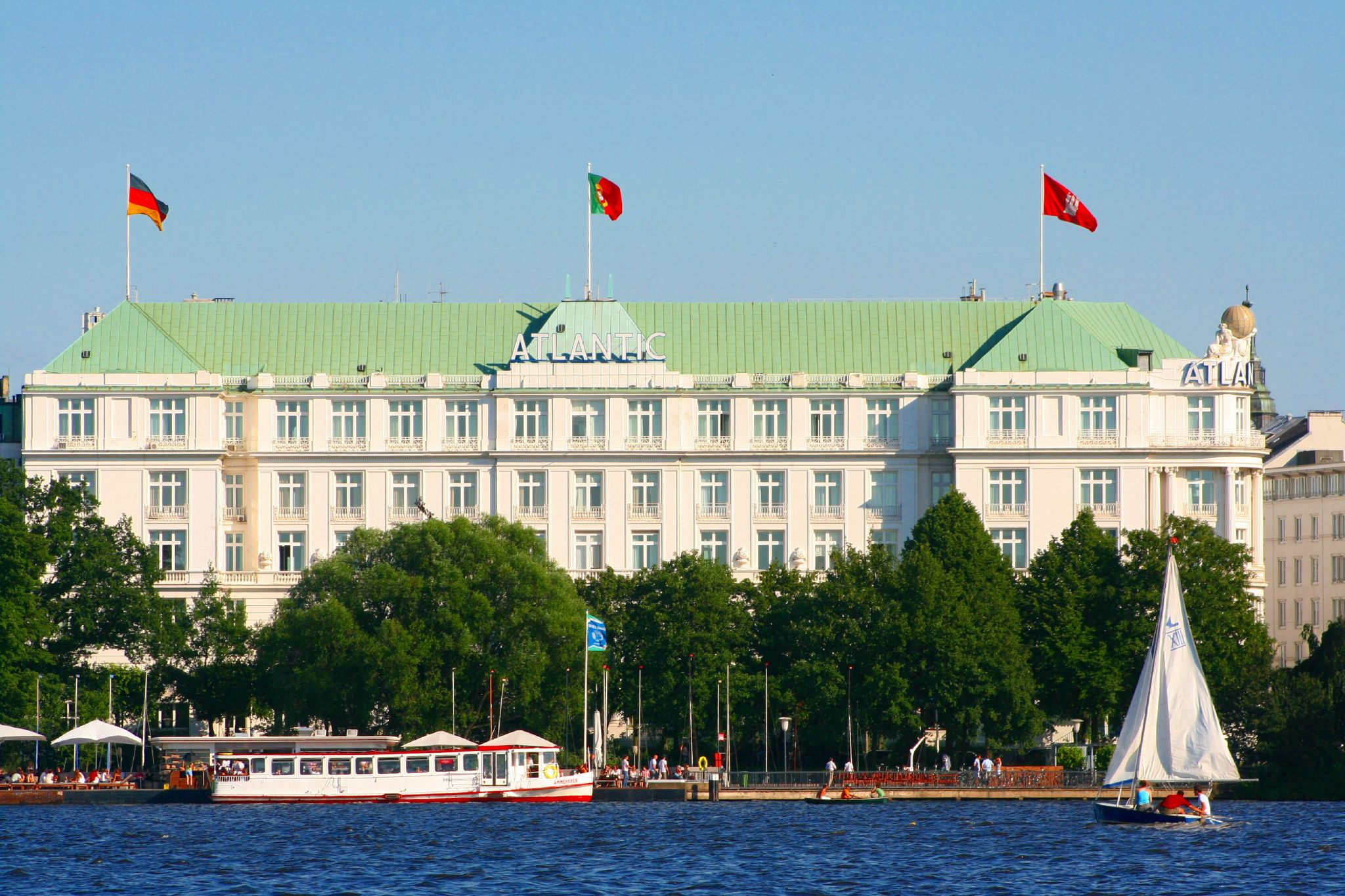
Hotel Atlantic Kempinski

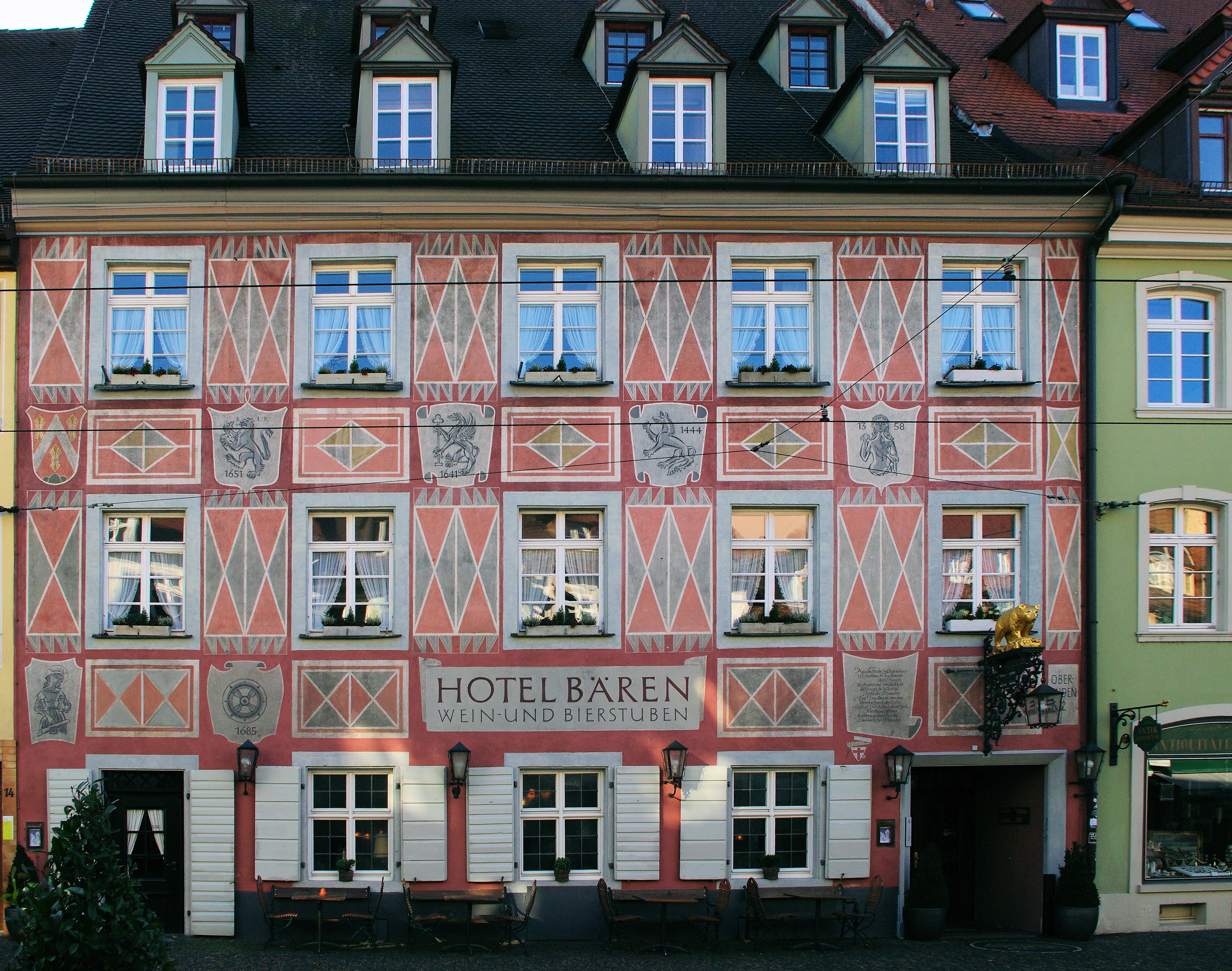
Zum Roten Bären

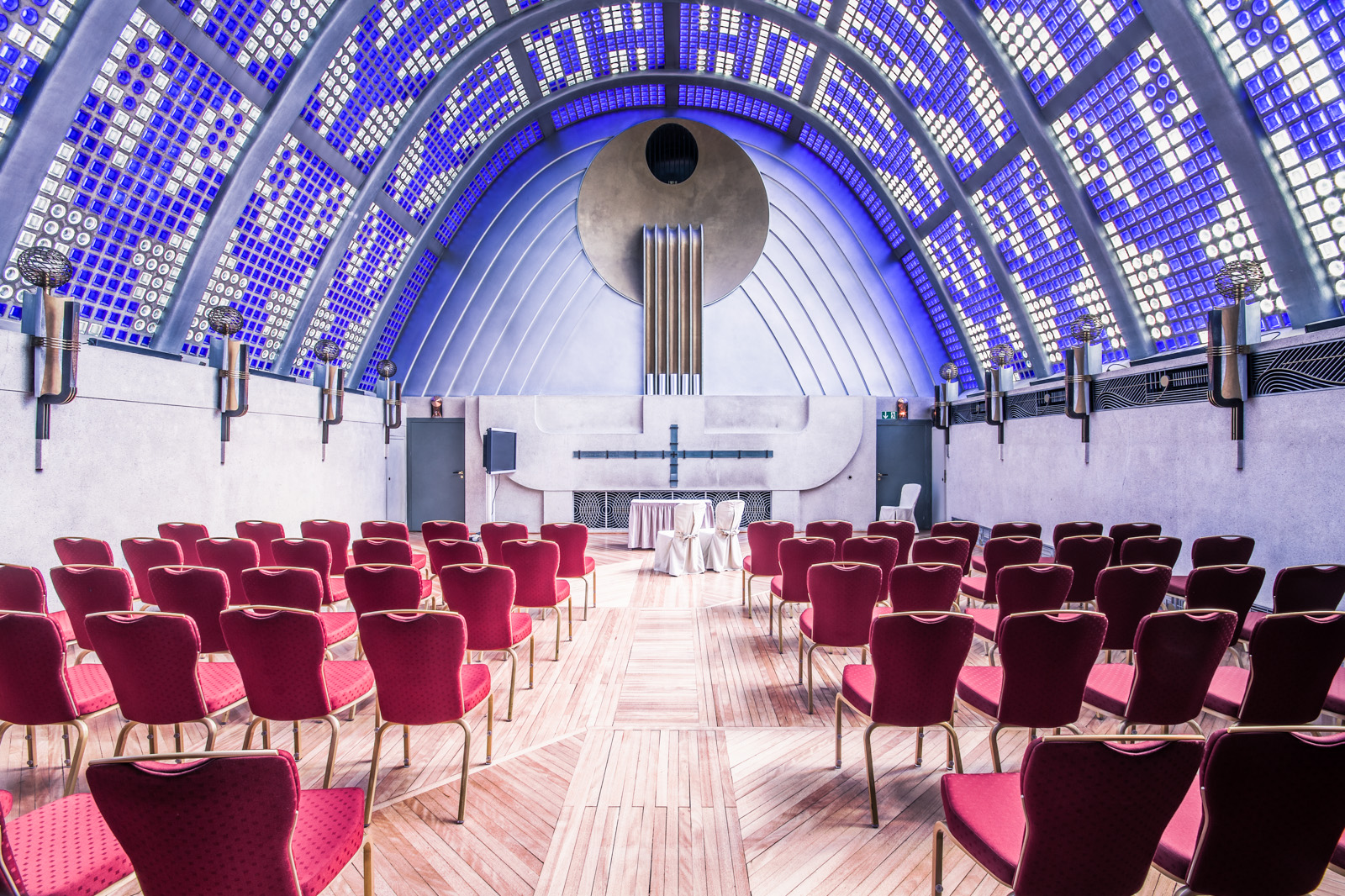
The "Himmelssaal" of the Atlantis House

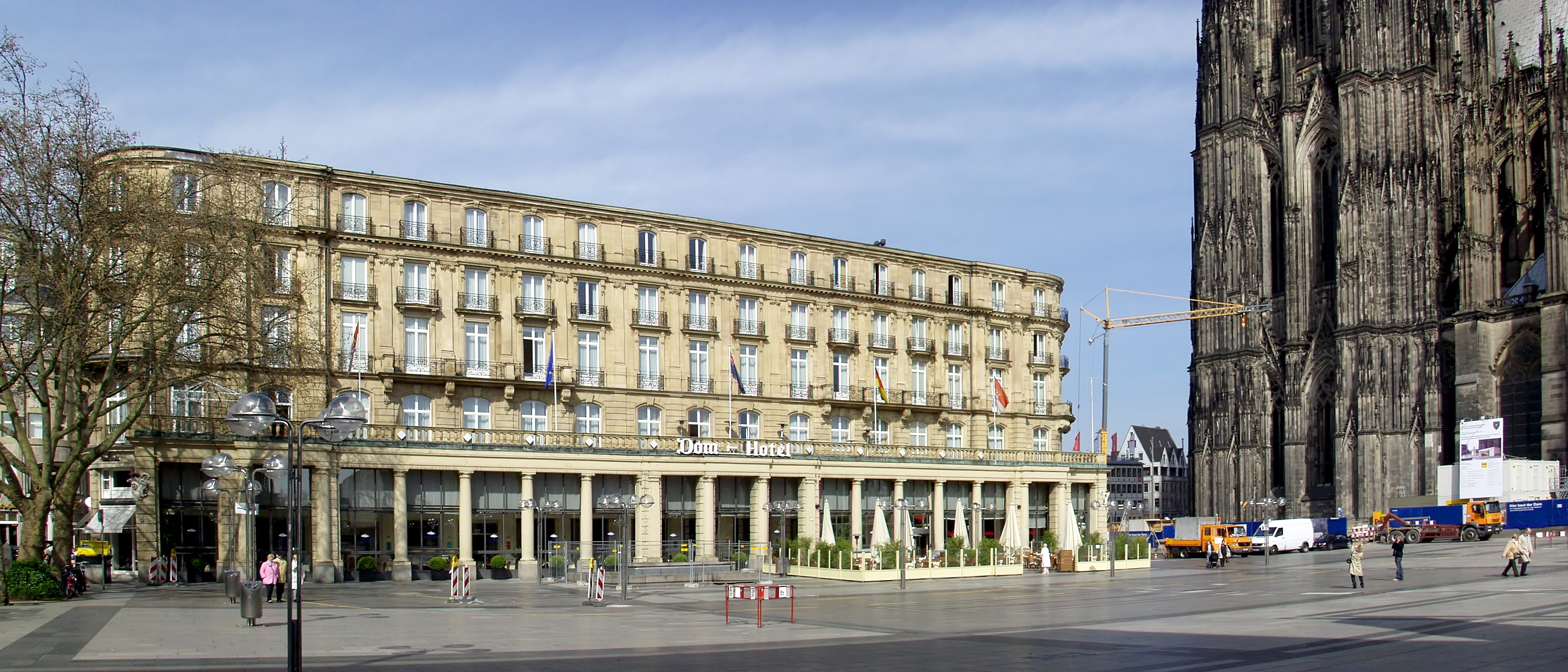
Dom-Hotel on the left, with Cologne Cathedral on the right

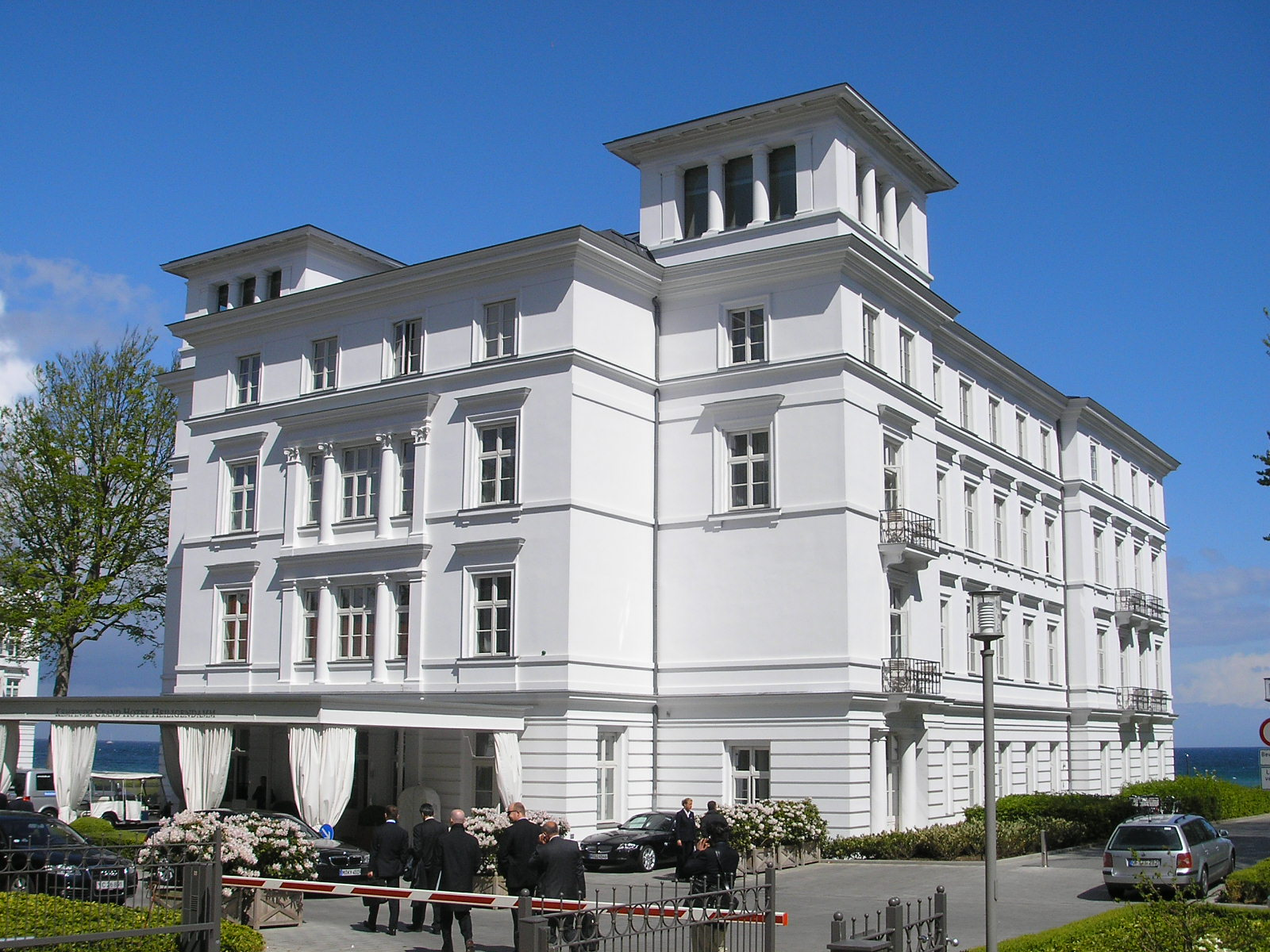
The Grand Hotel Heiligendamm, main building

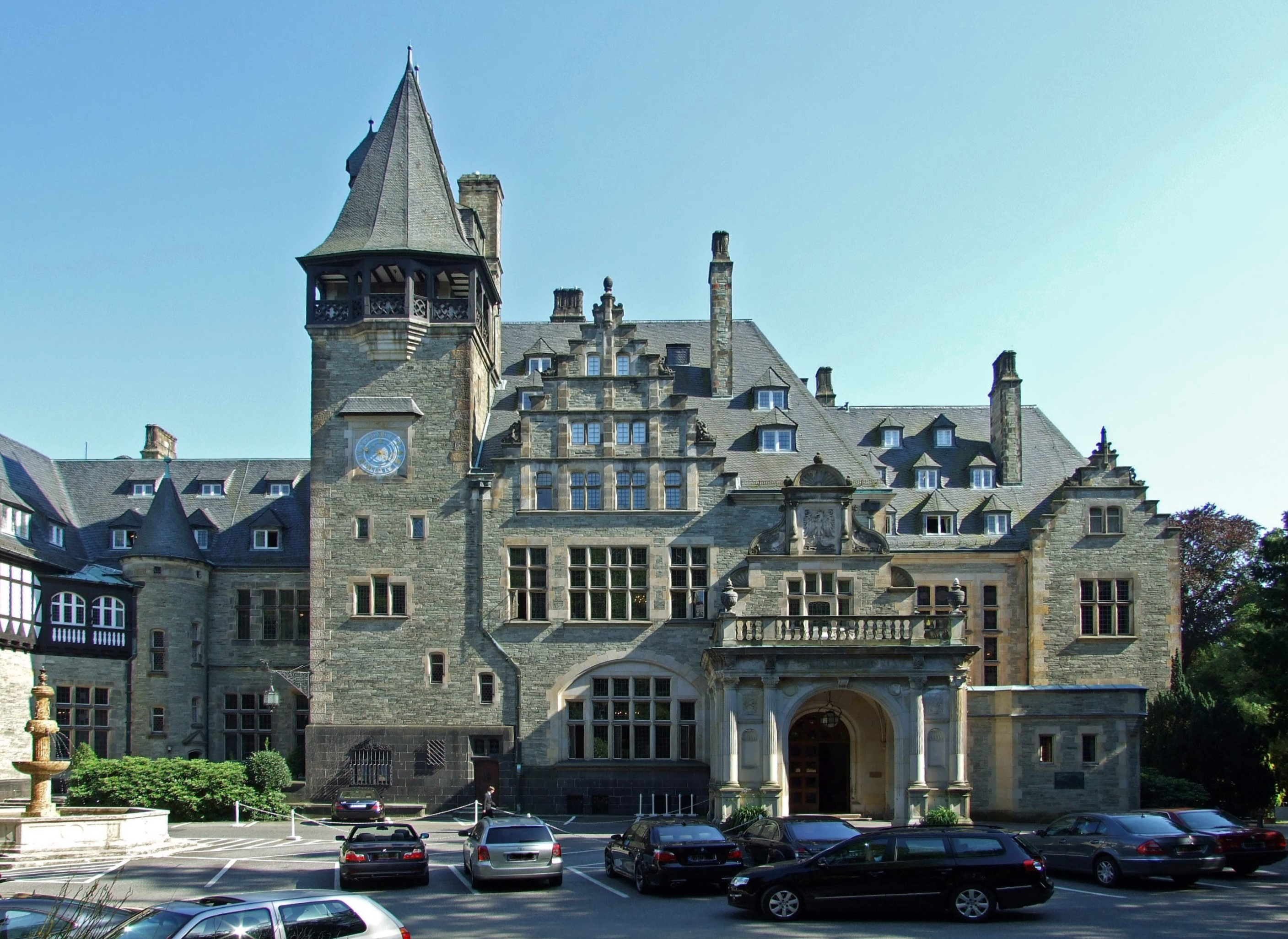
The Schlosshotel Kronberg in Kronberg im Taunus

=== Hotels in Berlin ===
- Estrel Hotel
- Grand Hotel Bellevue (defunct)
- Hotel Adlon
- Hotel Bellevue
- Hotel Berlin
- Hotel Berolina (defunct)
- Hotel Bristol (defunct)
- Hotel Esplanade (defunct)
- Hotel Excelsior (defunct)
- Hotel Fürstenhof (defunct)
- Hotel Kaiserhof (defunct)
- Miniloft
- Nhow Berlin
- Park Inn Berlin
- Propeller Island City Lodge
- Swissôtel Berlin
- Zoofenster
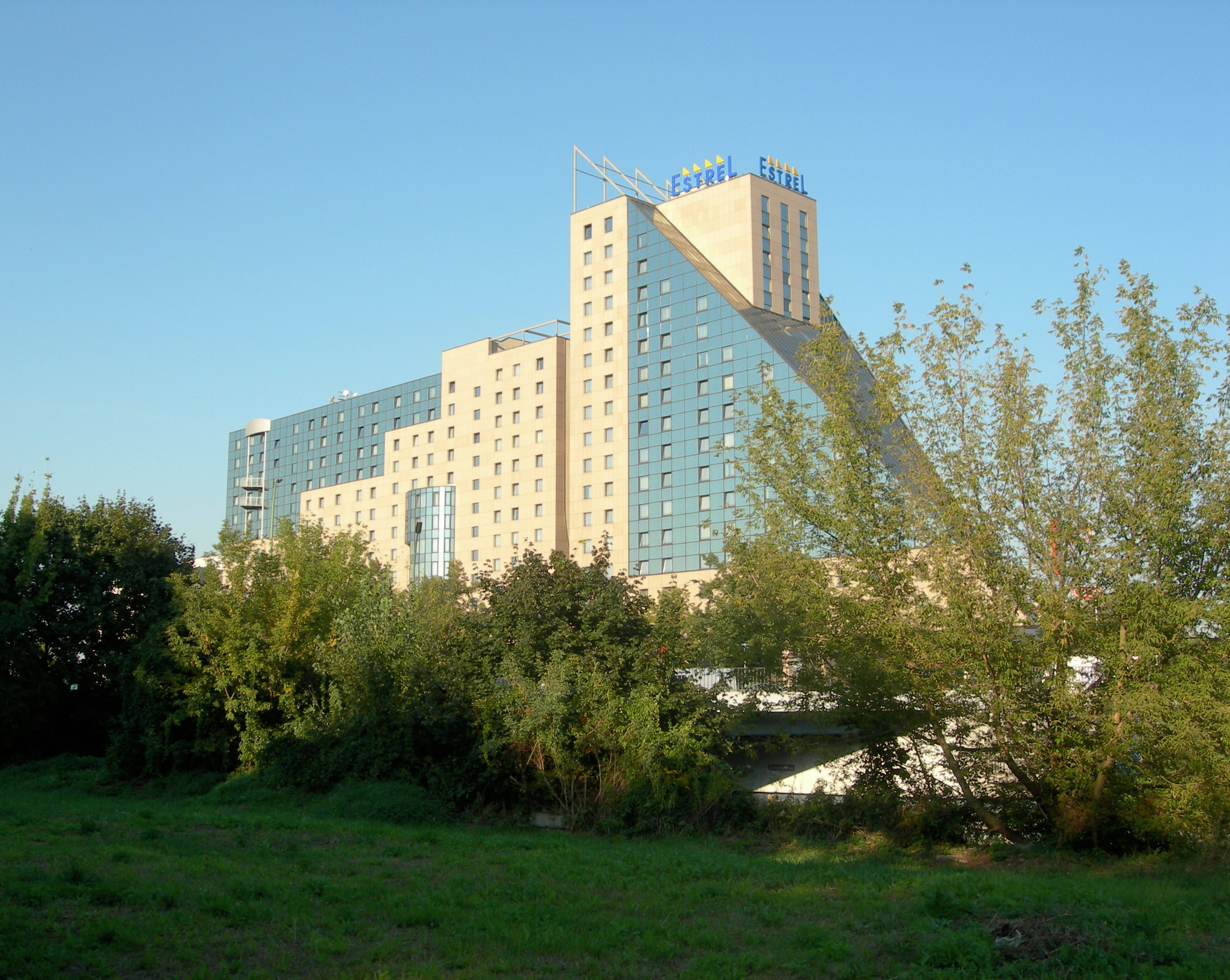
The Estrel Hotel in Berlin

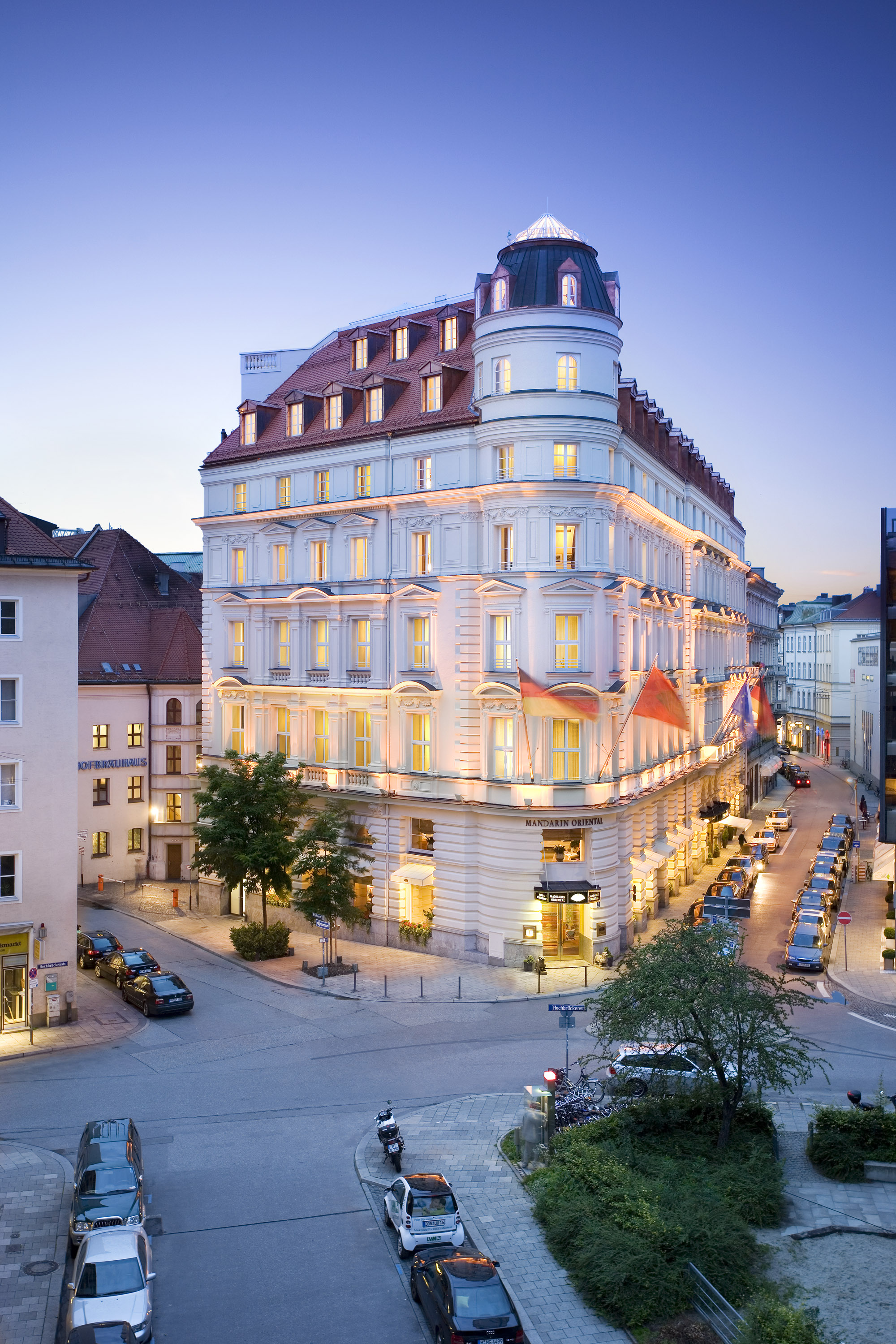
The Mandarin Oriental hotel in Munich

=== Hotels in Munich ===
- The Charles Hotel
- Hilton Munich Airport
- Hotel Bayerischer Hof
- Hotel Königshof
- Hotel Vier Jahreszeiten Kempinski
- Kempinski Hotel Airport Munich
- Kempinski Hotel Falkenstein
- Mandarin Oriental

== See also ==
- Lists of hotels – an index of hotel list articles on Wikipedia
