= Fenerbahçe Women Euroleague 2007–08 =

The EuroLeague Women is an international basketball club competition for elite women's clubs throughout Europe. The 2007-2008 season featured 24 competing teams from 13 countries. The draw for the groups was held on August 5, 2007, at the Kempinski Hotel in Munich. The competition began on November 7, 2007. The 2008 Final Four took place on April 11–13, 2008.

== Group stage ==
=== Group A ===
	Team	Pld	W	L	PF	PA	Diff
1.	(Russia) CSKA Moscow	10	10	0	891	630	+261
2.	(Turkey) Fenerbahçe Istanbul	10	6	4	717	732	-15
3.	(Hungary) MKB Euroleasing Sopron	10	5	5	718	729	-11
4.	(France) ESB Lille Metropole	10	4	6	665	758	-93
5.	(Latvia) TTT Riga	10	3	7	629	698	-69
6.	(Italy) Phard Napoli	10	2	8	703	776	-73

== Knockout stage ==
=== Round of 16 ===
Team #1	Agg.	Team #2	1st leg	2nd leg	3rd leg^{*}
Fenerbahçe Istanbul (Turkey)	2 - 0	(Poland) Wisła Can-Pack Kraków	78 - 61	67 - 59	
Bourges Basket (France)	2 - 0	(Hungary) MKB Euroleasing Sopron	69 - 47	68 - 48	

=== Round of 8 ===
Team #1	Agg.	Team #2	1st leg	2nd leg	3rd leg^{*}
Bourges Basket (France)	2 - 0	(Turkey) Fenerbahçe Istanbul	85 - 69	74 - 72	

- if necessary
