= Propeller Island City Lodge =

- Interactive map of the Propeller Island City Lodge area
- Alternative names: Propeller Island Hotel

General information
- Type: Hotel
- Architectural style: elclectic
- Location: Albrecht-Achilles-Straße 58, 10709, Berlin, Germany
- Coordinates: 52°29′49″N 13°18′13.25″E
- Opened: 1997
- Owner: Lars Storschen

Technical details
- Floor count: 3

Other information
- Number of rooms: 30+

Website
- http://www.propeller-island.de/? latimera (administrator & webdeveloper of the website)

Propeller Island City Lodge is a hotel and art installation in Berlin, Germany designed by artist Lars Storschen and located in the borough of Wilmersdorf. The hotel is known for its eclectic and elaborately themed rooms.

== History ==
In December 1997, German musician and artist Lars Storschen rented out rooms in his Berlin home to supplement his income. Bored with the idea of a traditional guest room, Storschen decided to create four uniquely themed rooms for his guests: the Symbol room, the Orange room, the Castle room, and the Mirrors room. He named the hotel Propeller Island City Lodge, based on the pseudonym he had adapted from the Jules Verne novel of the same name.

As the hotel's popularity grew, Strochen purchased vacant space in the same building and in 1998 began designing 27 new guest rooms. Floors 1 and 2 were opened in 2001, and the hotel's 3rd floor was completed in August 2002. As of 2013, the hotel consists of thirty rooms, including an art gallery, reception area, and Frühstücksraum (breakfast room).

== Rooms ==
Each room is considered more a work of art than a practical living space, and as such many are furnished with damageable or fragile materials. Guests are provided with a manual outlining specific rules for the care of their room's decorative touches. The rooms are not equipped with television or commercial radio, but there is a sound system featuring soundscapes recorded by Strochen. Since the opening of the hotel, some of the rooms have been redecorated.

=== List of Rooms ===
- 4 beams - Bed is suspended by ropes and surrounded by four large wooden posts
- Blue room - Room draped completely in blue with mirrored stainless steel "sails" on the walls
- Castle - Fortress-styled furnishings and abstract architecture painted on the walls
- Dwarf - Room is 1.4 metres (4 feet 7 inches) high and contains plastic gnomes
- Electric Wallpapers - Decorated with computer art; includes a kitchen
- Flying Bed - Slanted floor that creates an illusion of a flying bed
- Forest - Styled after a cabin; bed is built atop a stack of logs
- Freedom - Designed as a prison cell with an escape hole "broken" through a wall
- Gallery - Features a circular bed that can be rotated with a pedal to change view of the room
- Glas House - Constructed with stained glass and antique windows
- Grandma's - Antique decor, bathroom concealed in room's wardrobe
- Gruft - Goth-inspired room with coffin beds and a labyrinth underneath
- Hol(l)y-Wood - Transparent red glass walls and ladder-accessible beds
- Landscapes - Wave-shaped walls and an octagonal ceiling
- Medi-Terra - Styled after a Mediterranean village
- Mirror room - Walls and ceiling are completely covered in mirrors
- Museum - Contains artifacts from history of the City Lodge
- Nightlight - Bronze and gold walls with a giant plastic bag bathtub
- Nudes - Decorated with nude art
- Orange - Room decorated completely in orange
- Padded Cell - Modeled after a padded room in a psychiatric hospital
- Space-Cube - Blue industrial decor; bed can be separated by crank-operated illuminated barrier
- Speicher - Beam construction similar to a barn with a loft
- Symbols - Tiled floor to ceiling with symbols and glyphs
- The Table - Features raised circular bed in middle of the room
- Tempel - Styled after an Asian temple with a stepped bed
- Therapy - Features a variety of colored lights that can illuminate the room in different ways
- Two Lions - Design similar to a zoo or circus train; contains two elevated cages that can be used as beds
- Upside Down - Furniture is fixed upside-down on the ceiling; beds are hidden under the floor
- Wrapped - Tube-shaped room reminiscent of a mine shaft with terraced beds

== See also ==
- List of hotels in Germany
