= Columbushaus =

Office complex in Berlin (Demolished)

Coordinates: 52°30′36″N 13°22′34″E

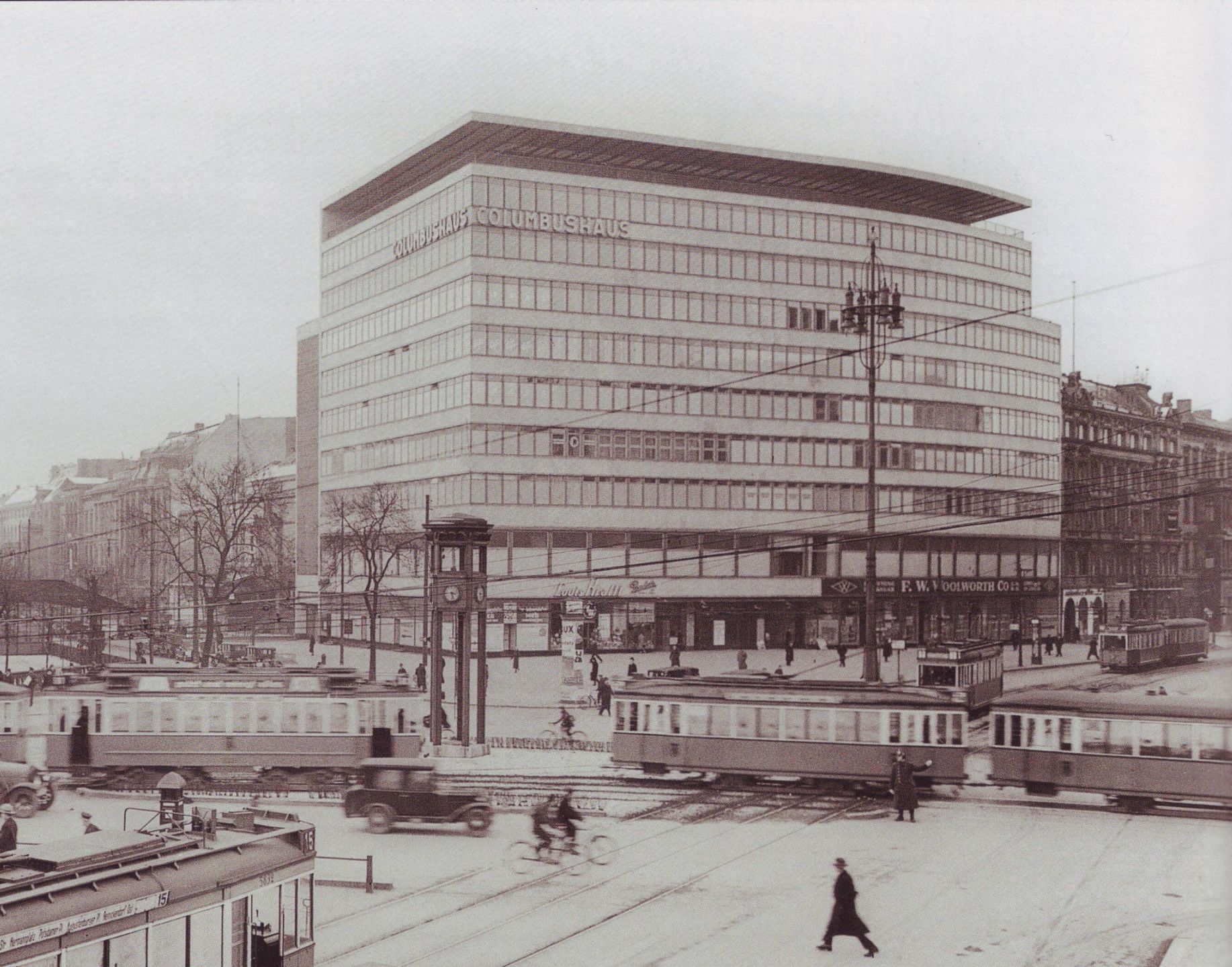
The Columbushaus in 1933, one year after its completion. Woolworth's with the dark signage at the right

The Columbushaus (Columbus House) was a nine-storey modernist office and shopping building in Potsdamer Platz in Berlin, designed by Erich Mendelsohn and completed in 1932. It was an icon of progressive architecture which passed relatively unscathed through World War II but was gutted by fire in the June 1953 uprising in East Germany. The ruin was subsequently razed in 1957 because it stood in the border strip; the site where the structure once stood was occupied by activists shortly before the fall of the Berlin Wall.

== Architecture ==
The Columbushaus has been described as a "little skyscraper". It was a horizontally detailed steel-frame building, the alternating bands of windows and spandrels on the upper floors prefigured by a conceptual sketch of Ludwig Mies van der Rohe. (Mendelsohn later claimed that he had to include masonry courses to allow for neon signs, and would otherwise have used only metal and glass.) The client required the façade to curve to follow the line of Friedrich-Ebert-Straße and also specified that the floor plans be flexible to allow for future use as a department store; Erich Mendelsohn's solution was to have the window frames of the outer walls bear much of the load on the upper floors in order to greatly limit the number of internal supports and enable configuration of spaces at will by means of partitions. On the lower floors, with their continuous glazing for retail use, the load was shifted to interior supports using cross girders and cantilever girders. It was the most advanced office building in Europe, and the first building in Germany to have ventilation equipment.

Stylistically, it was "perhaps the most pronounced and rigorous example of modern office building design in Berlin." It was conceived as a real piece of urban progressivism, in contrast to the fantasy world epitomised by Haus Vaterland, on the opposite side of the square.

Columbus Haus serves as an object of redemption, a spatial synthesis through which the path to pure reason can be rediscovered. It is the ultimate object of negation, conceived in rejection of the degeneration that obsessive consumption has caused to the culture. Its presence attempts to break the conspiracy between architecture and the persistence of the memory of Rome, the dangerous and uncontrollable evocation of ancient gods and mysteries. It is as if architecture had become naked, shedding all deception to purify itself and the city.

"Dedicated to an idealist version of America", it was intentionally revolutionary, its height and modernity in sharp contrast to the other buildings in the square, which were predominantly classical in detailing and many of which dated to the Gründerzeit of the last quarter of the 19th century. It was to have been part of a reconfiguration of Potsdamer Platz and the adjacent Leipziger Platz as modern spaces which was planned by Stadtbaurat Martin Wagner; as a result of the Depression, the Columbushaus was the only part of the project built. Mendelsohn planned the Columbushaus as part of a wall of skyscrapers around the reformed square; first, in 1928, proposing to combine both squares and in a second conceptual sketch, in 1931, making an octagonal plaza separated from Potsdamer Platz proper. Although no other buildings were built to place it in the intended context, the "last masterpiece of Mendelsohn's German period" was highly influential.

== History ==
=== Background and construction ===
The site at the corner of Friedrich-Ebert-Straße and Bellevuestraße, at one corner of what was known as the 'Lenné triangle' (between Bellevuestraße, Friedrich-Ebert-Straße and Lennéstraße), had been occupied by the Grand Hotel Bellevue, built in 1887/88. A consortium of German investors planned to build a branch of the French department store Galeries Lafayette on the site and engaged Mendelsohn to design it because of his prestige as a modernist. However, the owners of the Wertheim department store in Leipziger Platz immediately bought the adjacent land. Since part of the site was to be used to widen the street as part of Wagner's traffic improvements, the building had to be very tall.

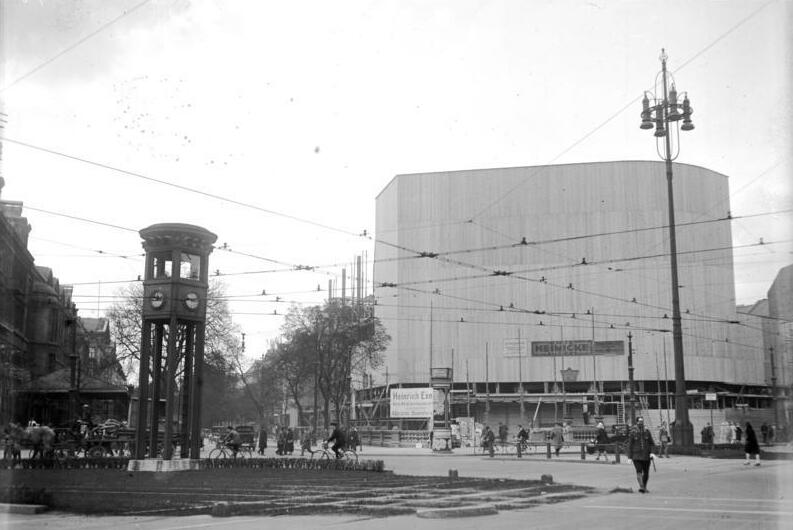
20-metre-tall advertising hoarding at the site, 1928

Mendelsohn submitted plans to the city for a 15-storey building, stepped down at both ends. There was to have been a two-storey rooftop restaurant, and large letters spelling out the name of the department store around the edge of the roof, and the foyer was to have also served as a subway entrance. When approval seemed likely, the hotel was demolished late in 1928 and he had a 20-metre-tall advertising hoarding built following the contours of the old building, with shops at the base. The hoarding advertised the forthcoming department store and also carried paid advertising, which defrayed some of the landowners' costs. However, in February 1929 the design was rejected as likely to exacerbate the traffic problems; instead, permission was given for a nine-storey structure, and in June that year, the start of construction was announced for September or October. However, in August the investors decided to build elsewhere, and then were prevented from doing so by the onset of the Depression.

Almost two years later, in August 1931, they announced that they would instead build the 10-storey Columbushaus on the Potsdamer Platz site. This version of the project Mendelsohn designed for Wertheim, and it was built in 1931–32.

=== Uses ===
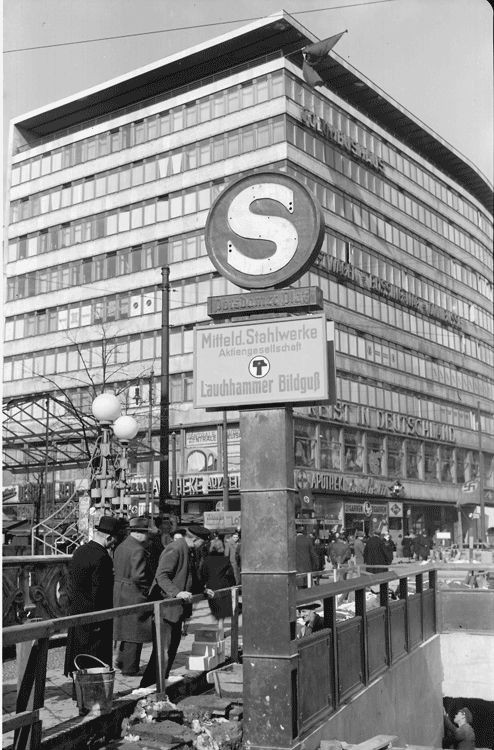
Columbushaus in 1939

Mendelsohn designed the building for maximum rental income. The ground floor was occupied by various shops, including a branch of Woolworth's. There were café restaurants on the first and ninth floors. The remaining floors in between were offices. Initially, the building included a travel agency, the Büssing bus and lorry company, Deutsche Edelstahl and other well known companies and organisations. A large neon sign advertising the Nazi newspaper Braune Post was mounted on the roof. During the 1936 Summer Olympics in Berlin, the Olympic Organising Committee's information centre was housed in the building.

The secret archive of the Leninist resistance organisation Neu Beginnen was in the building. On 1 December 1939, Richard von Hegener rented three or four offices in the building for a cover organisation founded to carry out the programme of execution of the physically and mentally unfit, which became known as Action T4 after the nearby address Tiergartenstraße 4 to which its headquarters moved in the spring of 1940.

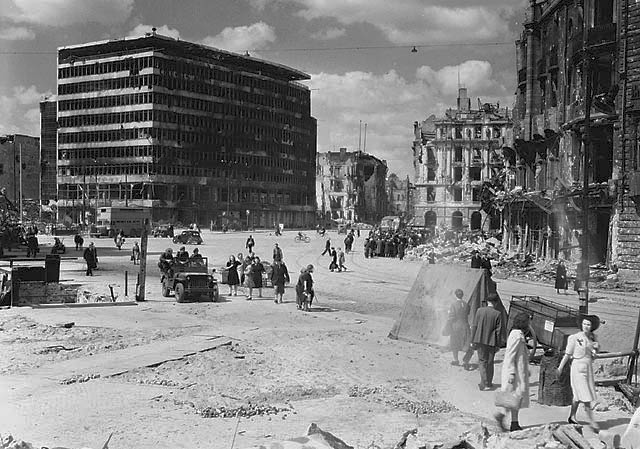
Columbushaus and ruins of other buildings in Potsdamer Platz, 1945

The building was damaged in the battle for Berlin in the closing days of the Second World War, but thanks to its modern steel frame construction, not destroyed.

Located in Mitte, the building was in the Soviet sector of occupied Berlin. Wertheim used some space on the ground floor for sales and on upper floors for offices. In 1948 the East Berlin council, the Magistrat, seized the property; the sales space was taken over by the national retail organisation, HO (Handelsorganisation), and the People's Police opened a police station in the building.

==== Fire and demolition ====
During the East German workers' revolt on 17 June 1953, the Mayor of Kreuzberg, Willy Kressmann, urged the police to offer no resistance, and they threw their uniforms from the windows and hung out a white flag, but the enraged crowd nonetheless set the building on fire. In 1957 the ruin was demolished and the site cleared. The steel was salvaged and reused.

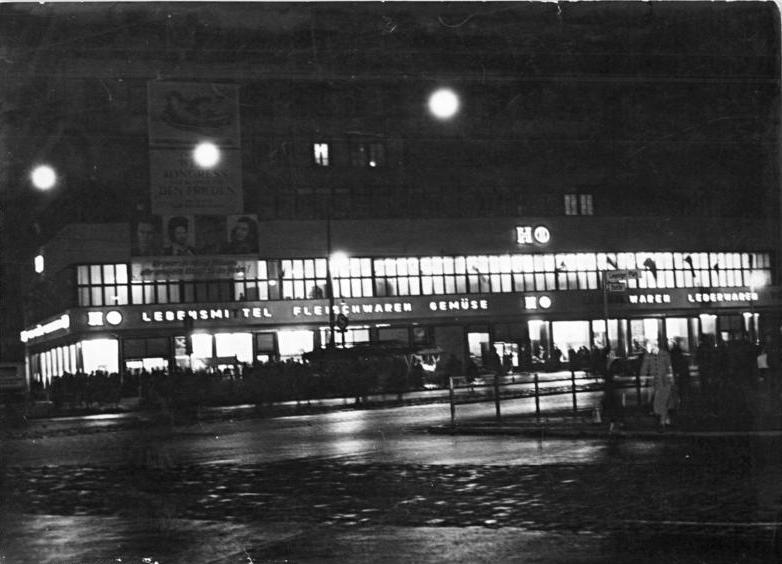
HO shop in Columbushaus, night view in January 1951

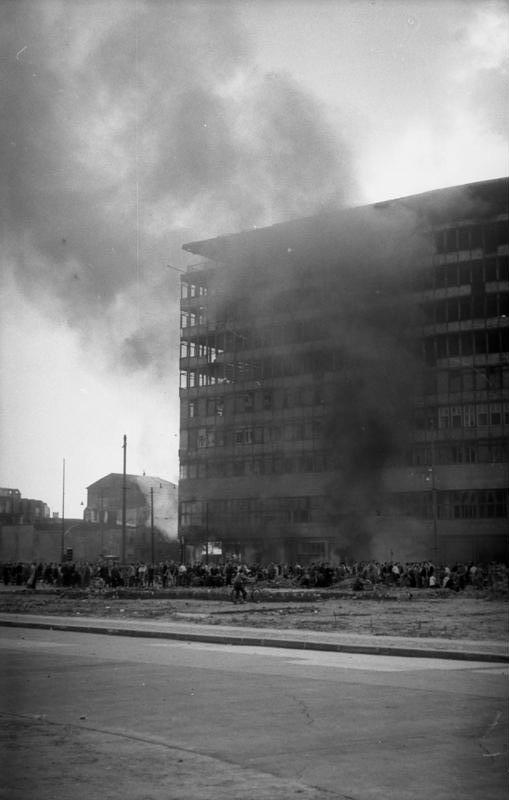
Columbushaus on fire, 17 June 1953

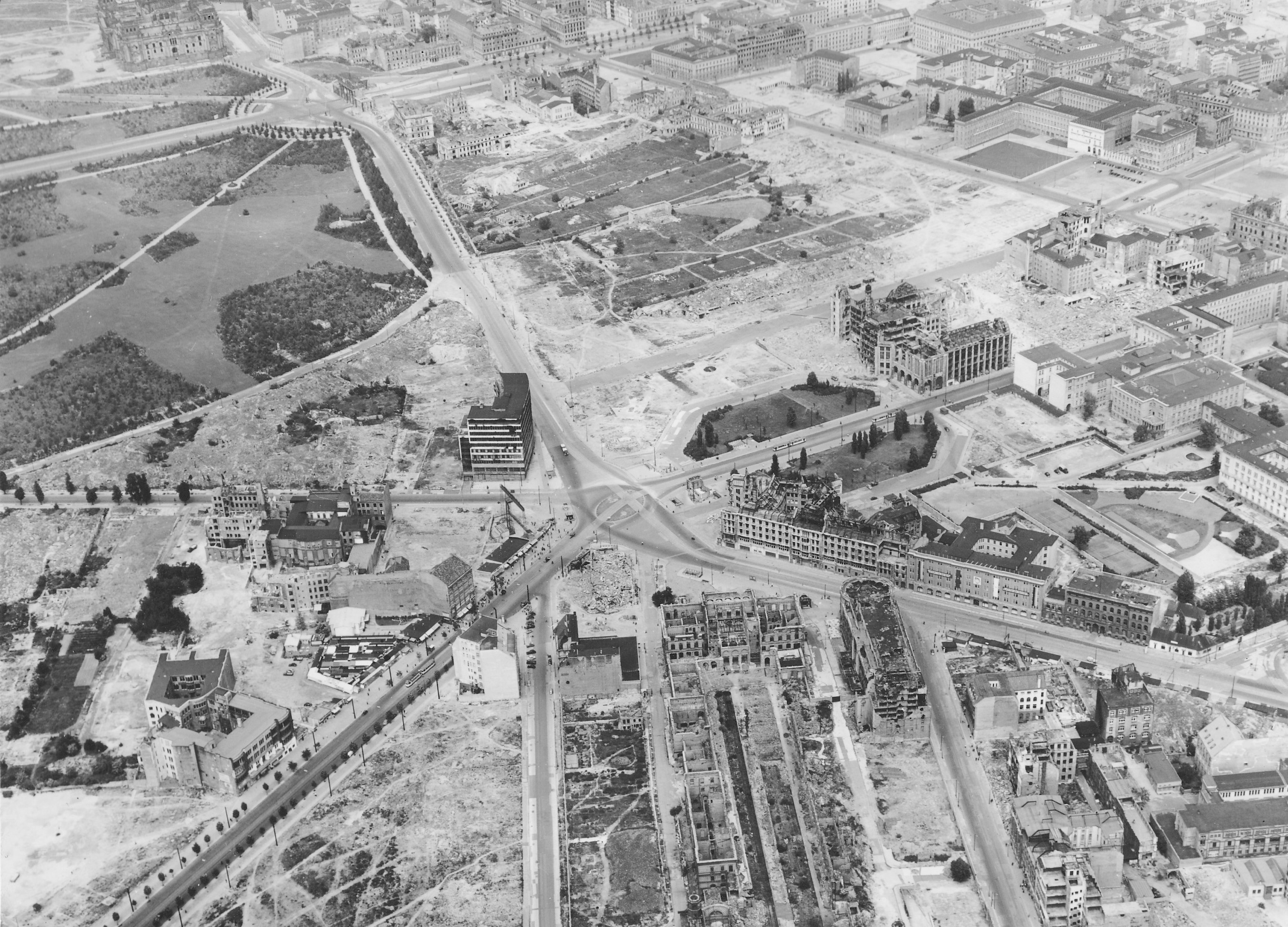
Aerial view, Columbushaus slightly left of center, 1954

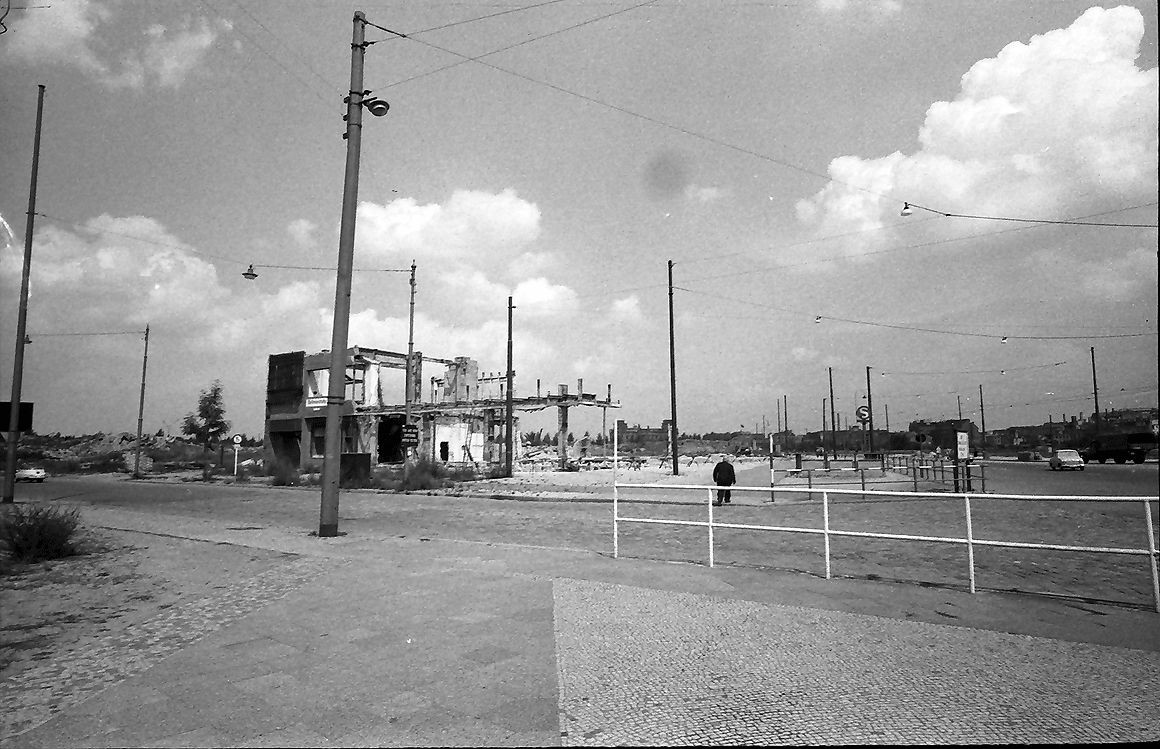
All that remained in 1957

=== Aftermath ===
When the Berlin Wall was erected in 1961, it continued the line of Friedrich-Ebert-Straße and the Lenné triangle lay outside it, separated from the West only by a fence with concrete posts; this saved building materials and gave better sightlines over the waste land, but occasionally Westerners would cut the fence.

In 1986, East German authorities arrested Wolfram Hasch there for making political graffiti on the wall. In March 1988, an agreement was reached to exchange 16 small pieces of land between East and West Berlin, including the Lenné triangle, to enable the building of an autobahn extension; West Berlin also paid 76 million Deutschmarks to the East. The Lenné triangle then became part of the Tiergarten district. However, before the exchange took effect on July 1, environmentalists occupied it, built an encampment, and declared it an extra-legal zone, the 'Norbert Kubat Corner', named for a young man who had taken his life in jail. Protesters were drawn to the site from all over the Federal Republic and in some cases from abroad; a radio station was established, and there was regular press coverage including foreign TV; the number occupying the site grew to about 600, and after the West Berlin Senate, having failed to obtain help from either the British or the Soviet occupying forces, tried first to fence off the area and then to have the police disperse them (playing loud music at night among other tactics), they fortified the encampment and threw stones at the police. Police responded with tear gas, the squatters with slingshots, fireworks and Molotov cocktails. Early in the morning of July 1, when the police moved in, the 180–200 people still occupying the site fled over the wall, in "the first mass flight over the wall from West to East". The East German border police assisted them over, with their dogs, bicycles and other possessions, and the authorities fed them breakfast, took them into the Friedrichstraße station at the border via the diplomatic entrance, and gave them tickets so that they could travel back to West Berlin without being caught by the West German police, who had tightened ticket checking in anticipation.

Since German reunification, Potsdamer Platz has been entirely redeveloped. The Lenné triangle is now occupied by the Beisheim Center, which includes Marriott and Ritz-Carlton hotels among other facilities and was funded by Otto Beisheim and other investors. In preparation for construction, which began in 1995, an approximately 30-year growth of woodland on the site was felled.

== Urban myth: confusion with Columbia-Haus ==
The Columbushaus has often been identified with the Columbia-Haus (occasionally spelt Columbiahaus) on Columbiadamm in Tempelhof. The Columbia-Haus was a former military prison (Militär-Arrestanstalt), opened in 1896 as the third of its kind in Berlin. It was abandoned in 1929 and fell empty. After the adjacent street was renamed Columbiadamm, for Charles Lindbergh's plane WB-2 Miss Columbia (N-X-237), the empty building close to Tempelhof airport was called Columbia-Haus. As soon as the Nazi Party came to power, like many similar premises in Berlin, the Columbia-Haus was made into a so-called "wild concentration camp"; spontaneously established, with 400 inmates by September 1933, the Columbia-Haus concentration camp was later formalised as part of the Concentration Camps Inspectorate.

The camp was closed in preparation for the extension of the airport in 1936, and the building was demolished in 1938 to make way for the never completed new airport terminal on which work took place between 1936 and 1945. The site of the prison is now part of the terminal compound. The name and its actual location fell into oblivion, and the name Columbiahaus was given again to a new office building completed in 1939 on the Columbiadamm at the corner of Platz der Luftbrücke, which now houses the Hauptzollamt Berlin (Berlin chief customs office). In post-war searches for the Columbia concentration camp this building was usually, and correctly, discarded as the location of the camp for its late date of construction. A memorial for the concentration camp was only erected in 1994, diagonally opposite the actual former site, which was within the then still operating airport (closed in 2008).

However, the striking resemblance of the names caused many to identify the Columbia-Haus with Columbushaus, thus referring the history of the concentration camp to the former building by Erich Mendelsohn. The two are often confused, especially in older publications.

== Sources ==
- Columbushaus: Geschäfts- und Bürohaus, am Potsdamer Platz, Bellevuestrasse, Ecke Friedrich-Ebert-Strasse, Berlin. Berlin: Bellevue-Immobilien-AG, 195-. OCLC 83346681 (in German)
- "1931–1932 Columbushaus". Bruno Zevi. Erich Mendelsohn. 1982, Translated ed. New York: Rizzoli, 1985. ISBN 978-0-8478-0555-6. pp. 122–27.
