= Falkenstein Grand Hotel =

Hotel in Germany

Coordinates: 50°11′32″N 8°28′47″E

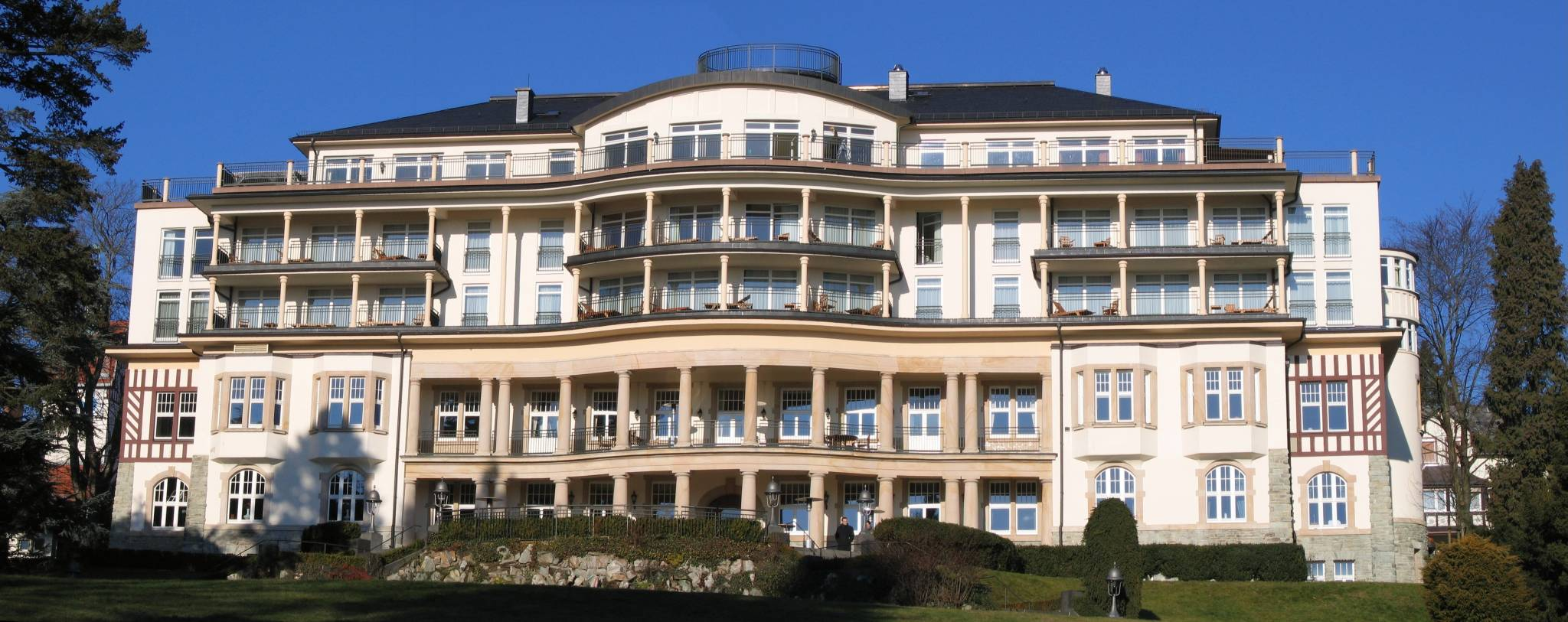
Hotel in 2005

The Falkenstein Grand Hotel is a luxury resort in Königstein im Taunus (Falkenstein im Taunus), Germany. It was founded in 1875 as a sanatorium for officers. The current structure was completed in 1909 and opened by Kaiser Wilhelm II. It was a sanatorium until 1976 and also served as a hospital, military sanatorium and hospital for invalids before being closed in 1991. On 9 September 1999, it re-opened as a 106-room luxury hotel, the Kempinski Hotel Falkenstein Königstein Frankfurt, managed by Kempinski hotel. In 2001 The German Hotel and Restaurant Association awarded the hotel five stars. In January 2021, its management transferred from Kempinski to Marriott International's Autograph Collection division.

== See also ==
- List of hotels in Germany
