= Zum Schwan =

Inn in Saxony

Coordinates: 51.2978°N 13.1091°E

- Native name: Gasthaus Zum Schwan
- Industry: Hotel
- Founded: 1458
- Headquarters: Sporerstraße 2, 04758 Oschatz, Germany
- Website: www.hotel-schwan-oschatz.de

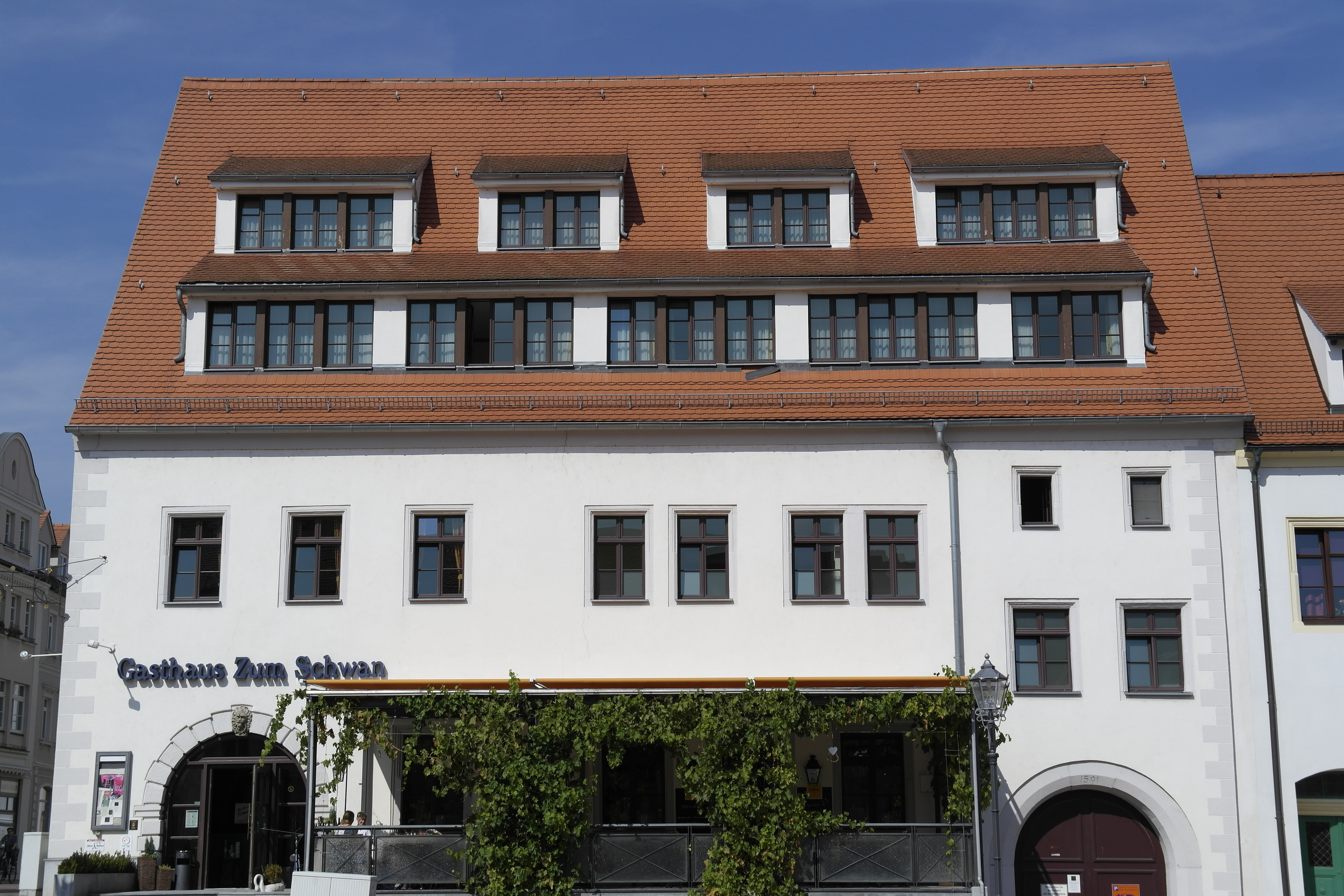
Zum Schwan

Zum Schwan is one of the oldest inns in Saxony, founded in 1458 and located in the historic city center of Oschatz, Germany.

== History ==
Historical events:

- The guest house forms the corner from Neumarkt to Sporerstraße. In 1458, a Peter Dorbach owned "Die Stuben", in which Elector Ernst von Sachsen was already a guest in 1477. The house was first mentioned as an inn in 1547, which received a 1602 electoral privilege.
- Since 1630 it is attested as an inn "Zum Weissen Schwan" and existed since 1656 out of two houses, which both city fires have lasted. During the time of the Poststrasse, the rulers often rose here. Frequent conversions changed and supplemented the property.
- Since 1872, the inn was owned by the Krug family and after 1980 owned by the consumer cooperative. From 1990, this venerable property was closed.
- On October 23 1999, it was reopened after 10 months of reconstruction. Well-kept gastronomy and modern hotel industry await the guests.
- In September 2005, the capacity of the hotel expanded by two bed houses at the Altmarkt, which are connected to the guest house by a covered corridor.

== See also ==
- List of oldest companies
- List of hotels in Germany
