= Estrel Hotel =

Coordinates: 52°28′27″N 13°27′34″E

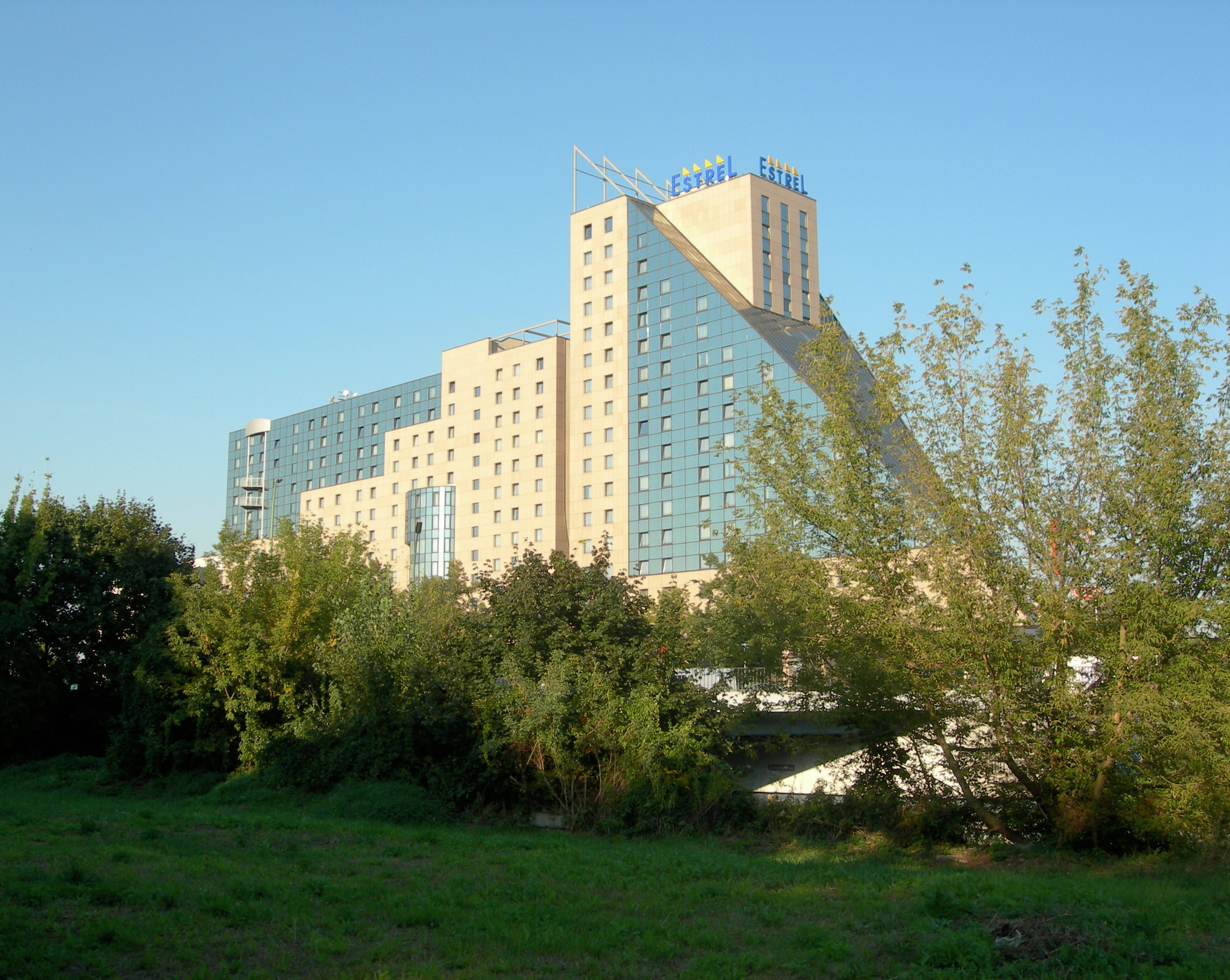
- Estrel Hotel in Neukölln, Berlin

General information
- Type: Hotel
- Location: Sonnenallee 225, 12057, Berlin, Germany

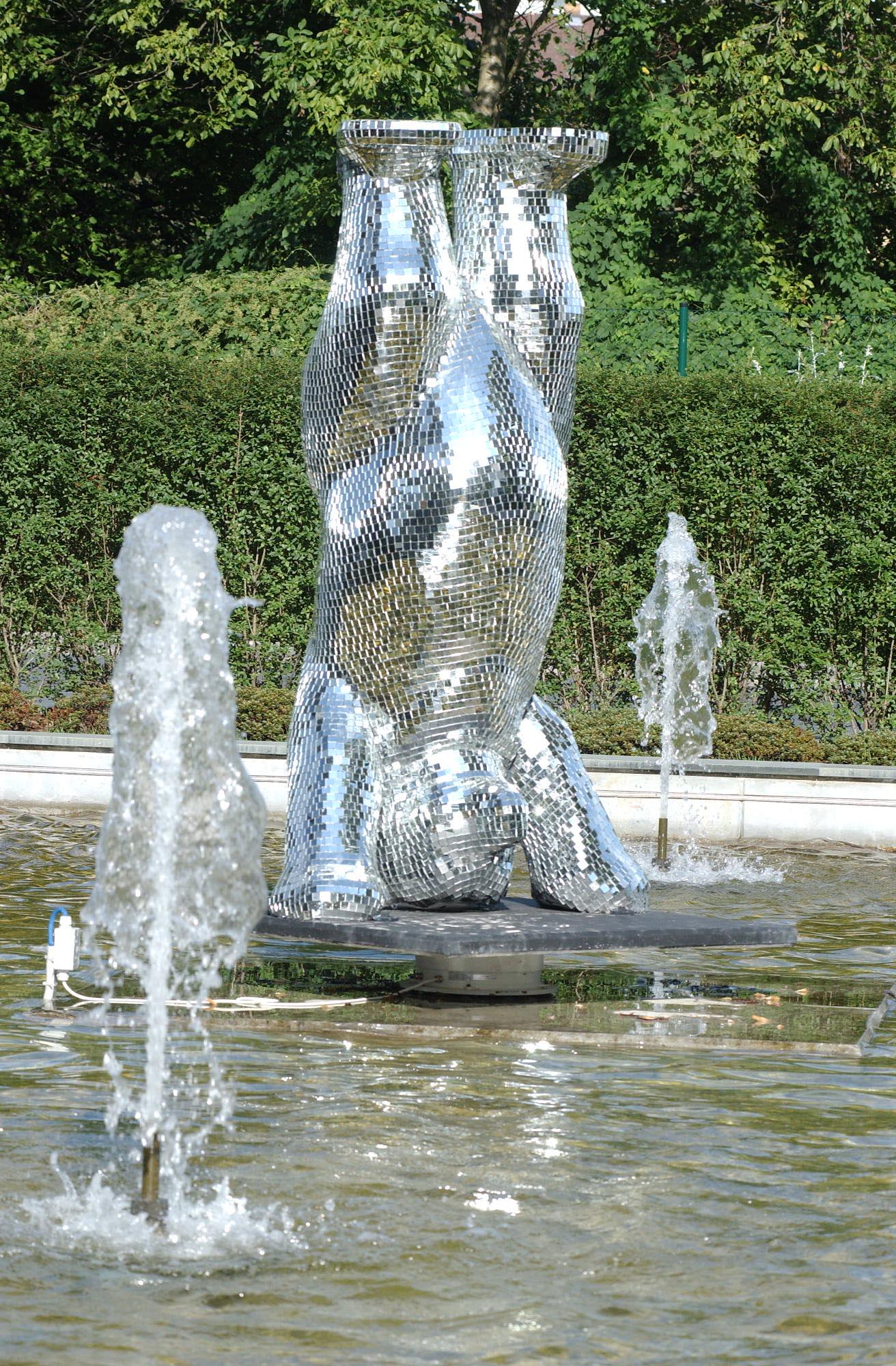
Buddy Bear in the courtyard of Estrel Hotel in Berlin. Artist: Ilja Kireev

The Estrel Berlin in Berlin is Europe's largest convention, entertainment, and hotel complex, and with its 1,125 rooms the largest hotel in Germany. With a total turnover of 100.8 million DM (Deutsche Mark) in the year 2000, the Estrel became the hotel with the highest turnover in Germany, a status which it retained. In 2009 it had a turnover of €50.45 million.

The Estrel employs a total of 450 people including trainees, in addition another 150 employees from outside companies and about 100 part-time employees.

== Private ownership ==
The Estrel does not belong to a hotel chain but is privately owned by the contractor and building namesake Ekkehard Streletzki, who received the industry prize "Hotelier of the Year 2000". Furthermore, Ekkehard Streletzki was awarded the “Verdienstkreuz am Bande” (the Federal Cross of Merit on ribbon) by the Order of Merit of the Federal Republic of Germany in November 2005 in honour of his lifetime achievements, his social commitment, and his work for the city of Berlin.

== Location ==
The hotel is located near the train station Sonnenallee in the district Neukölln near the city center. It has its own railway station which enables guests to arrive and depart with chartered trains, and an own jetty along the Neukölln shipping channel from where sight-seeing and boat tours are on offer.

== Opening ==
The Estrel Hotel was opened in October 1994. Since 1997 the Estrel Festival Center, a reconstructed factory hall, hosts the successful Las Vegas live show Stars in Concert with impersonators of international stars like Michael Jackson, Tina Turner, Elvis Presley and others which was attended in 2010 of more than 3.8 million visitors. The entire Estrel complex was completed in 1999 with the construction of the Convention Center which hosts around 1,800 events a year, including major sporting events (e.g. boxing championships), major fairs (such as the World MoneyNotes Fair) and political events.

== 2009 World Championships in Athletics ==
The Estrel is one of two hotels that provided accommodation for the athletes who participated in the 2009 World Championships in Athletics, the other being the Hotel Berlin.

== Expansion ==
In 2014 plans were announced for the Estrel to be expanded with a new hotel tower. The new tower will have 50 stories, with 700 more hotel rooms and will be 176 metres tall, which will make it the second tallest structure of Berlin and the tallest hotel in Germany.

== See also ==
- List of hotels in Germany
