= Dom-Hotel =

German five-star hotel

- Interactive map of the Dom-Hotel area
- Hotel chain: Althoff Hotels

General information
- Location: Innenstadt, Cologne, Germany, Domkloster 2 / Roncalliplatz
- Coordinates: 50°56′26″N 6°57′25″E
- Opening: 1857

Other information
- Number of rooms: 111
- Number of suites: 13
- Number of restaurants: 3

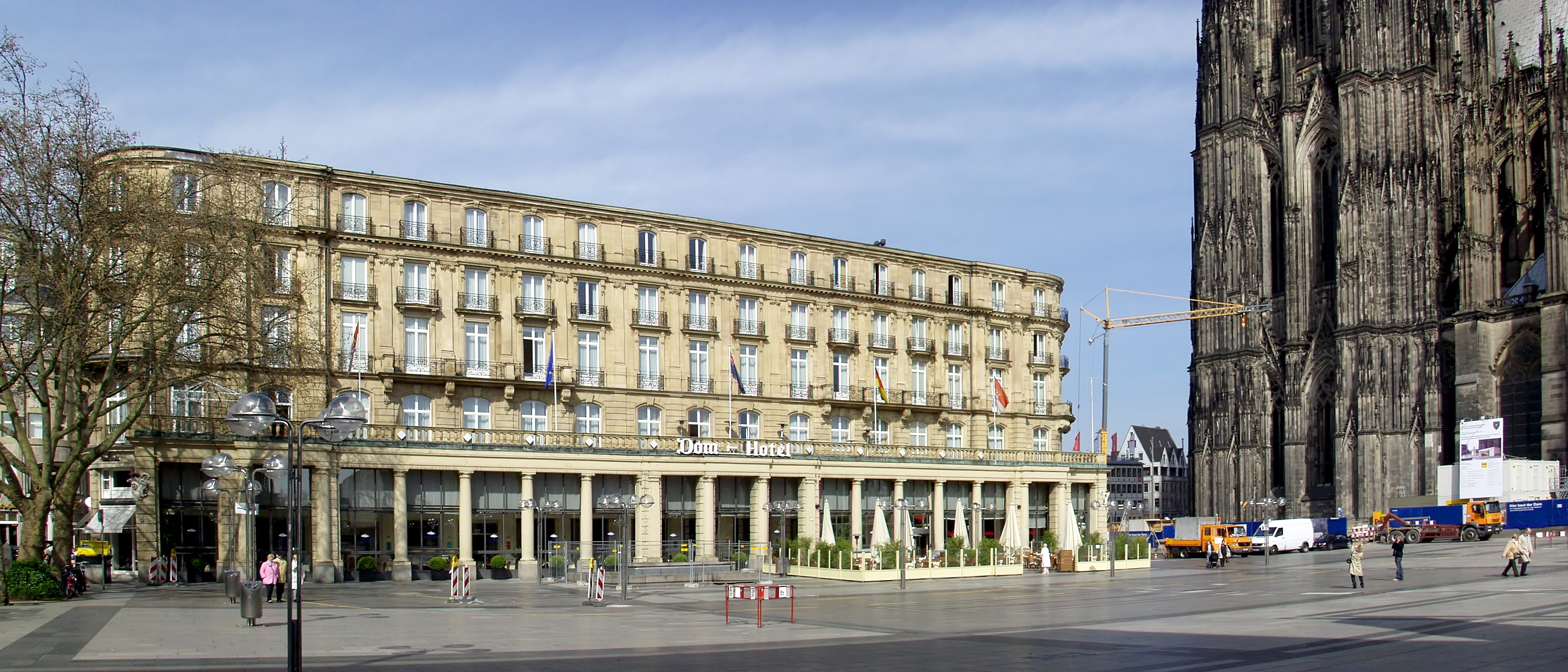
Dom-Hotel on the left; Cologne Cathedral on the right

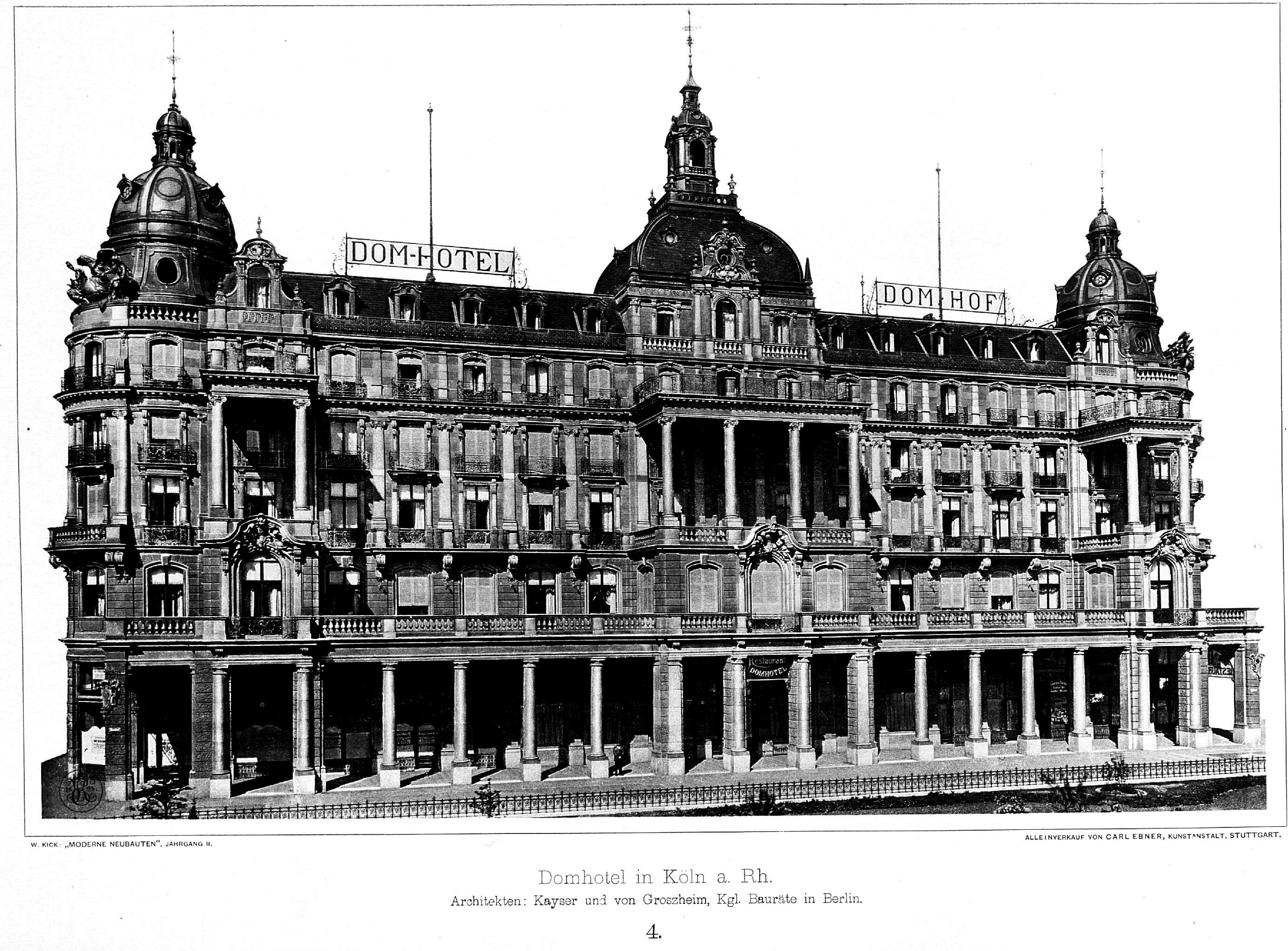
Dom-Hotel in 1898

The Dom-Hotel is a five-star hotel in Cologne, Germany, located on Roncalliplatz in Innenstadt. The hotel is named after Cologne Cathedral (the Dom), which is its direct neighbour. The hotel is one of the oldest grand hotels in Europe; its location and history make it one of the city's most prominent buildings.

== History ==
The first Hotel du Dome to open on the location was established by Ignatz Theodor Metz (1819-1880) in 1857, after purchasing an existing building two years earlier. After a construction damage a renovated hotel was opened in 1866. The current building became the third building on this site, completed in 1893 but severely damaged during the Second World War. After reconstruction during the 1950s, the former roof-story has been left away.

In 2007, the hotel celebrated its 150-year anniversary. It was a member of Le Méridien Hotels for many years, but was sold in 2012 and left the chain in 2013. It is undergoing renovations, originally set for completion in 2014 when it will become part of the Althoff Hotels chain. However after several delays and construction issues a reopening of the largely newly built hotel is undated.

== See also ==
- Excelsior Hotel Ernst, Cologne
- List of hotels in Germany
