= Hotel Atlantic Hamburg =

Hotel in Hamburg, Germany

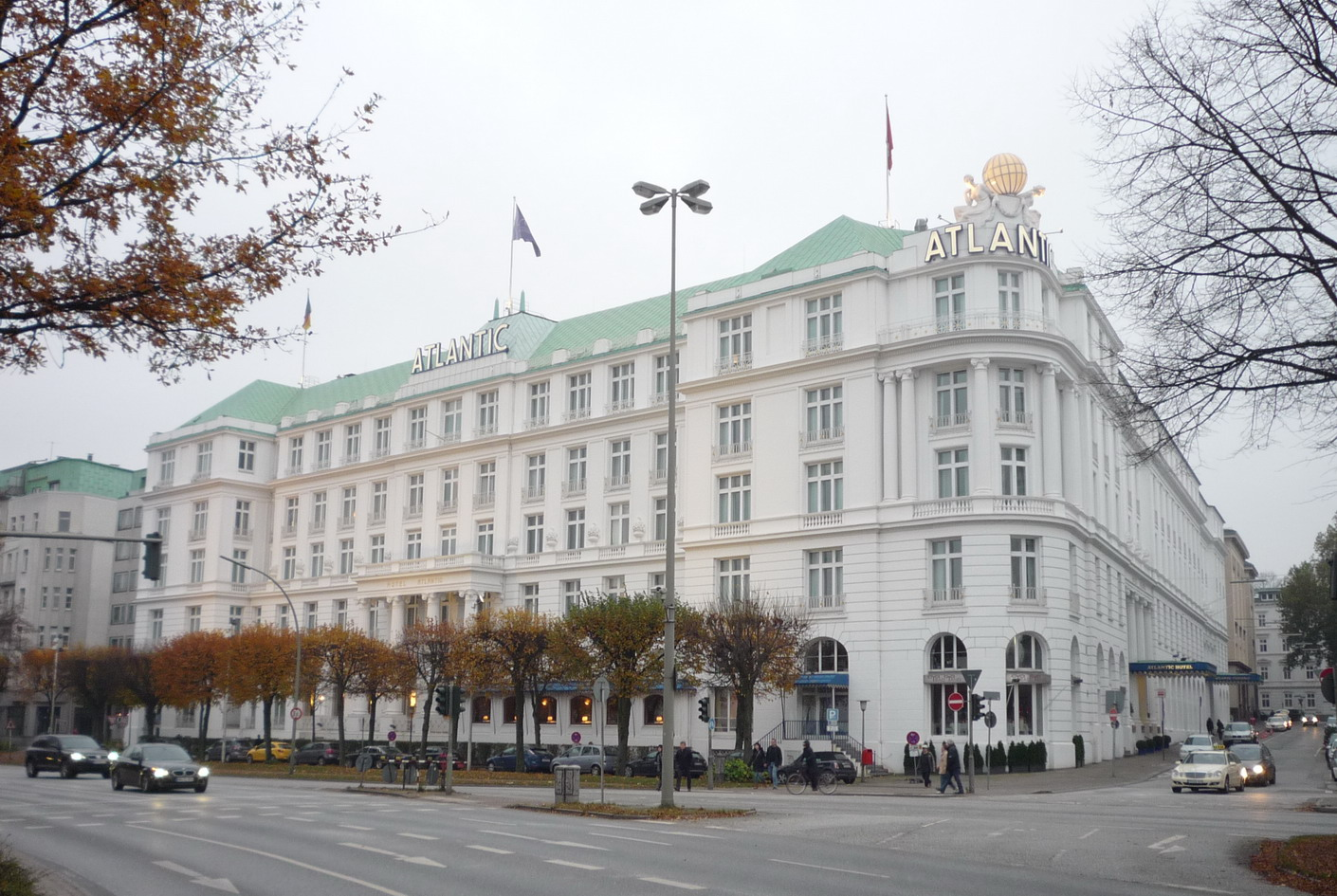
- Hotel Atlantic on An der Alster

General information
- Location: An der Alster 72−79; Hamburg, Germany
- Coordinates: 53°33′26″N 10°0′17″E
- Opening: 2 May 1909
- Owner: Dr. Broermann Hotels & Residences GmbH
- Operator: Marriott Hotels

Other information
- Number of rooms: 245
- Number of restaurants: 2
- Number of bars: 2

Website
- Official website

The Hotel Atlantic Hamburg is a historic luxury hotel in Hamburg, Germany, opened in 1909. It is located in the St. Georg district, between the Außenalster lake and the Hamburg Hauptbahnhof.

== History ==
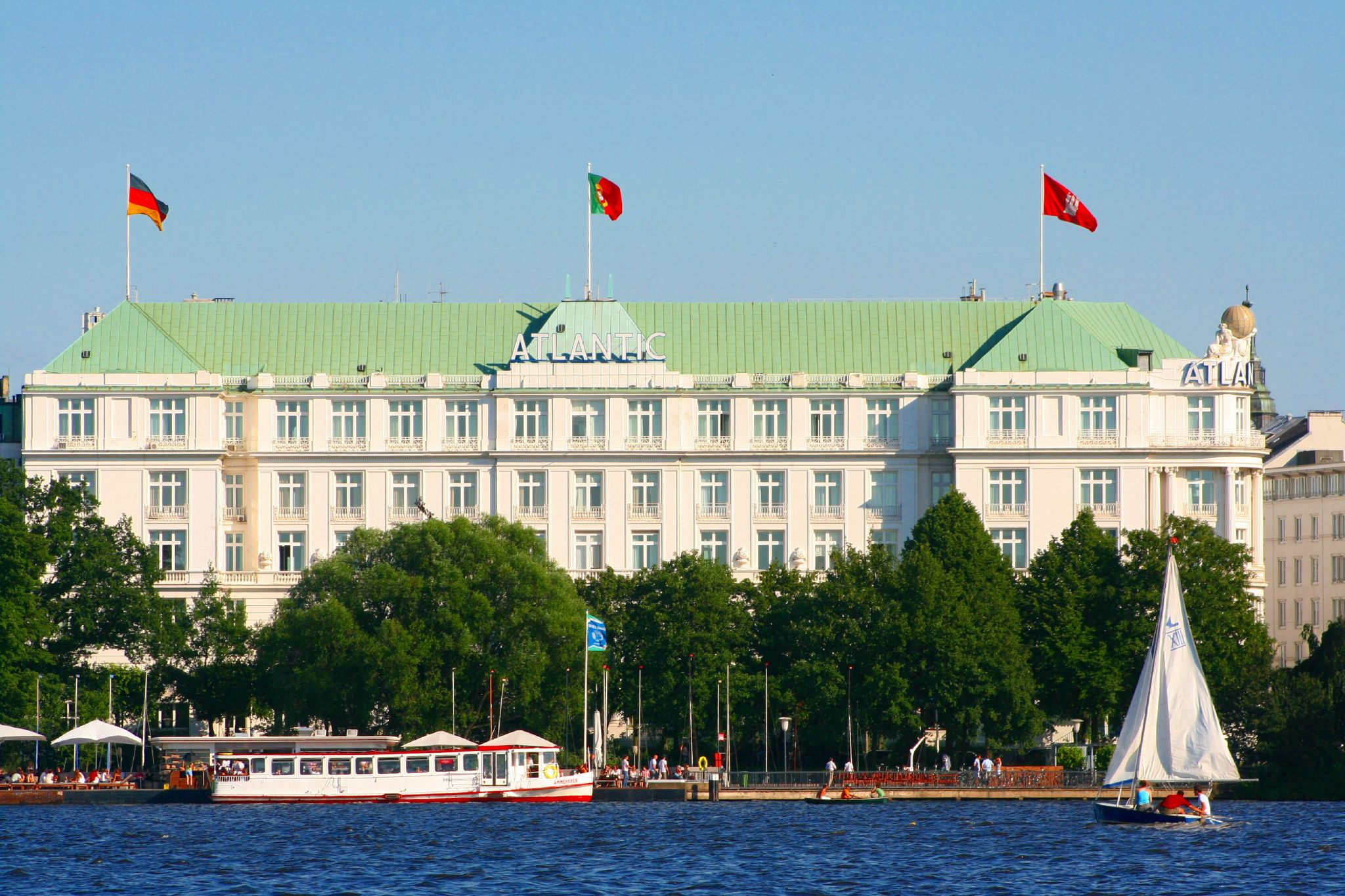
Hotel Atlantic as seen across the Außenalster

The Hotel Atlantic was constructed at a cost of 14 million gold marks and was designed to house passengers on transatlantic ocean liners of the Hamburg America Line (HAPAG) and the Hamburg South America Line. It was opened on 2 May 1909 by Chancellor Bernhard von Bülow and HAPAG general director Albert Ballin.

Following the end of World War II, it was requisitioned by the British Armed Forces and used as their Hamburg headquarters from 1945 to 1950. The English writer Stephen Spender, who made a tour of the British occupation zone in Germany in September and October 1945, recorded in his journal his arrival on 4 October 1945 at the Hotel Atlantic Hamburg: ‘The Atlantic Hotel is, apart from the Officers’ Mess in Paris, the most grandiose Officers’ Mess I have been to. It also contains very good-looking officers.’

The hotel reopened on 1 March 1950. In 1957, the hotel was sold to the Kempinski chain.

In 1994, German financier Dieter Bock sold Kempinski Hotels, but maintained ownership of the Hotel Atlantic. In 2014, the hotel was sold to German billionaire Bernard Broermann. In 2017, it was announced that the hotel would cease to be managed by Kempinski in January 2021 and would switch to Marriott's Autograph Collection chain. The hotel left Kempinski on 13 January 2021.

== In popular culture ==
In 1997, parts of the James Bond movie Tomorrow Never Dies were filmed in the hotel. Owner Dieter Bock choked to death in the hotel on May 12, 2010.

== See also ==
- List of hotels in Germany
