= Miniloft =

Slender/Bender
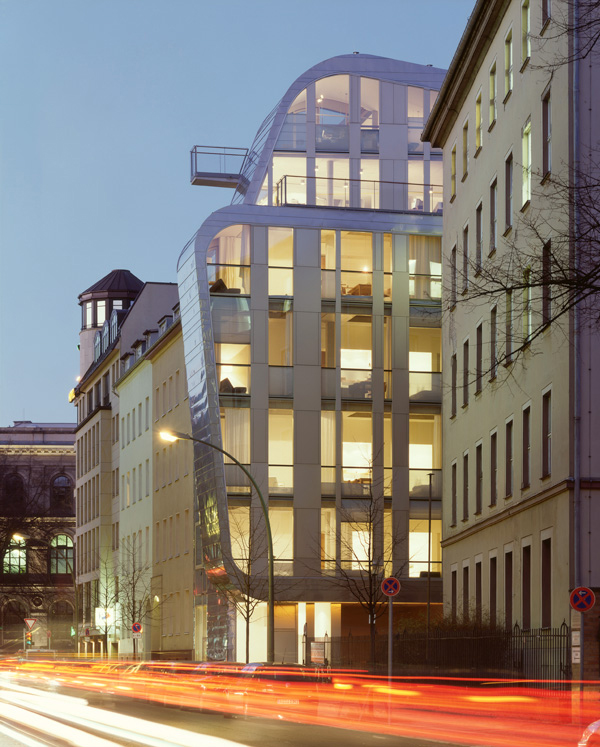
- Miniloft Berlin
- Interactive map of the Slender/Bender area

General information
- Type: Apartment Hotel, Office
- Location: Hessische Str. 5 10115 Berlin Germany
- Coordinates: 52°31′45″N 13°22′48″E
- Construction started: 2001
- Completed: 2004

Design and construction
- Architect: Deadline

Website
- http://www.miniloft.com

Miniloft is a Berlin-based apartment hotel that features 14 spacious, loft-type apartments in two adjacent buildings.

== Slender ==
The older of the two buildings was renovated in 2002 and won the Berliner Architekturpreis in 2003. It contains three Classic and three Compact minilofts, as well as the owner's apartment.

== Bender ==
The newer building was built in 2004. It features a curved stainless steel and glass façade. In 2004, it was nominated for the EU's Mies van der Rohe award and was exhibited in the German Pavilion of the Venice Biennale. It contains four Introverted and four Extroverted minilofts.

== Frizz23 ==
A related project by the same architects is Frizz23 at Friedrichstrasse 23.

== Architecture ==
Both buildings were designed by the architecture office Deadline. The twin project was published in multiple architectural journals, including A10 and the Deutsche Bauzeitung.
