= Excelsior Hotel Ernst =

Hotel in Cologne, Germany

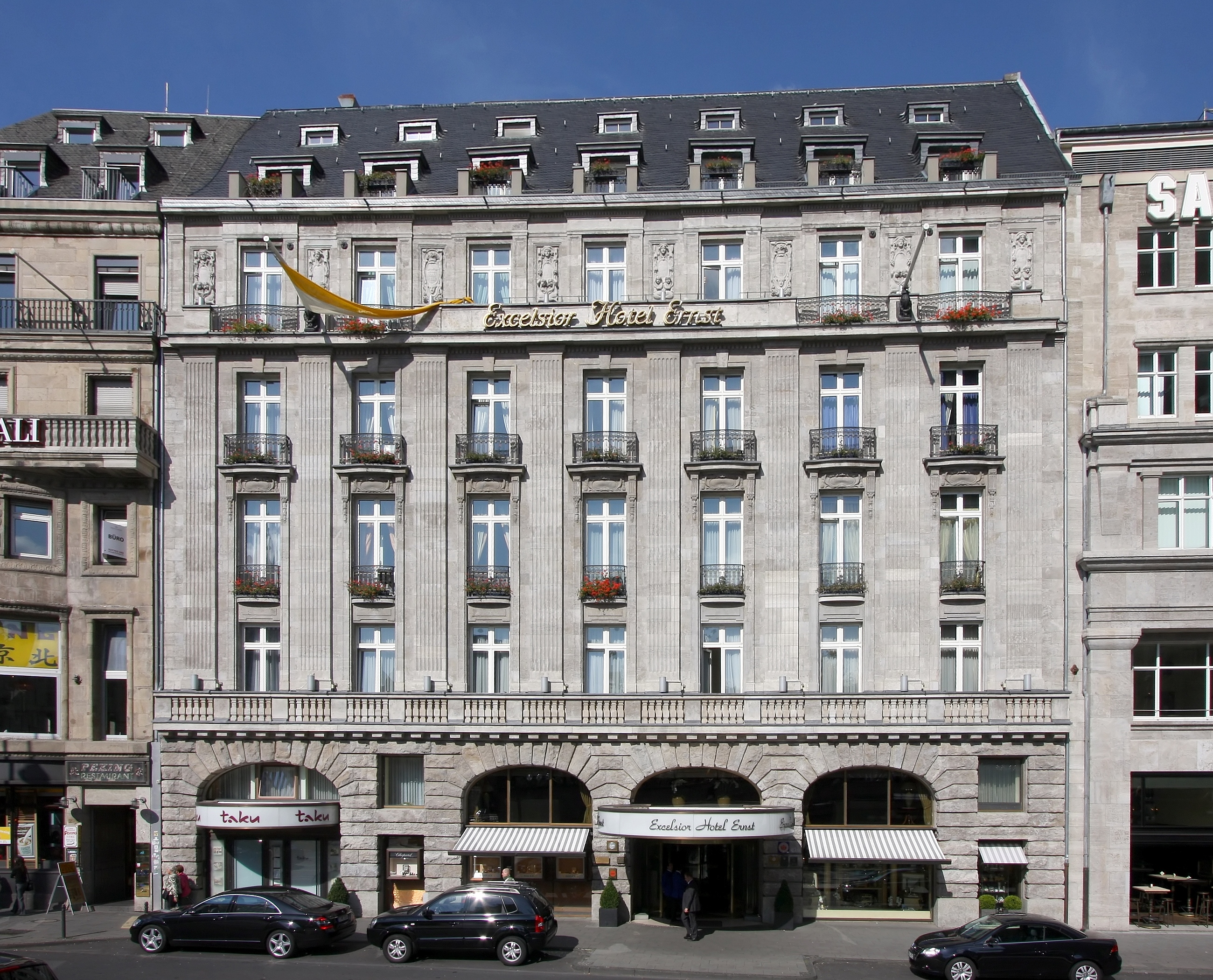
- Interactive map of the Excelsior Hotel Ernst area

General information
- Location: Innenstadt, Cologne, Germany, Domplatz/Trankgasse 1-5
- Coordinates: 50°56′30″N 6°57′23″E
- Opening: 16 May 1863

Other information
- Number of rooms: 142
- Number of suites: 13
- Number of restaurants: 2

Website
- www.excelsiorhotelernst.com

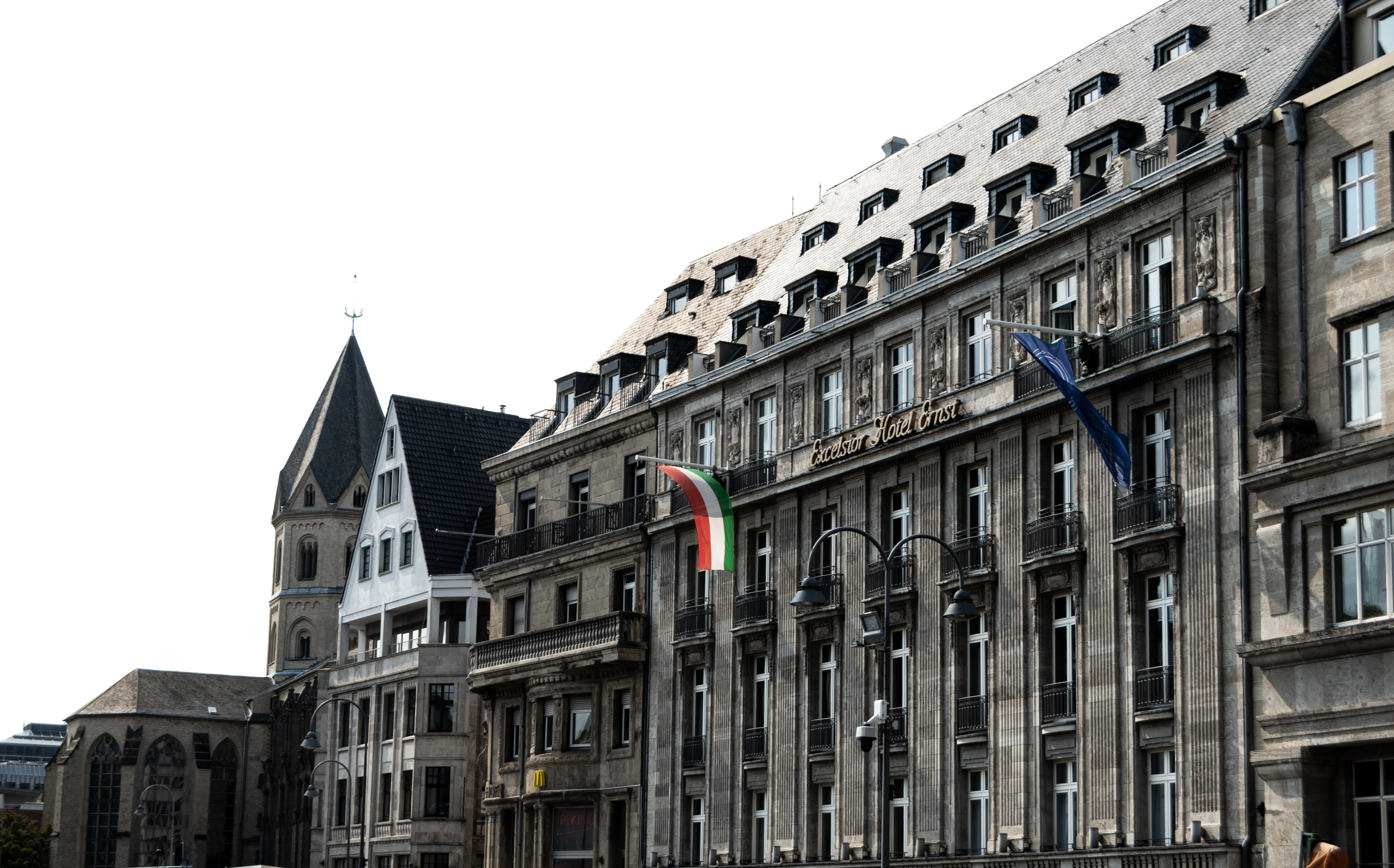
Excelsior Hotel Ernst in context, 2025

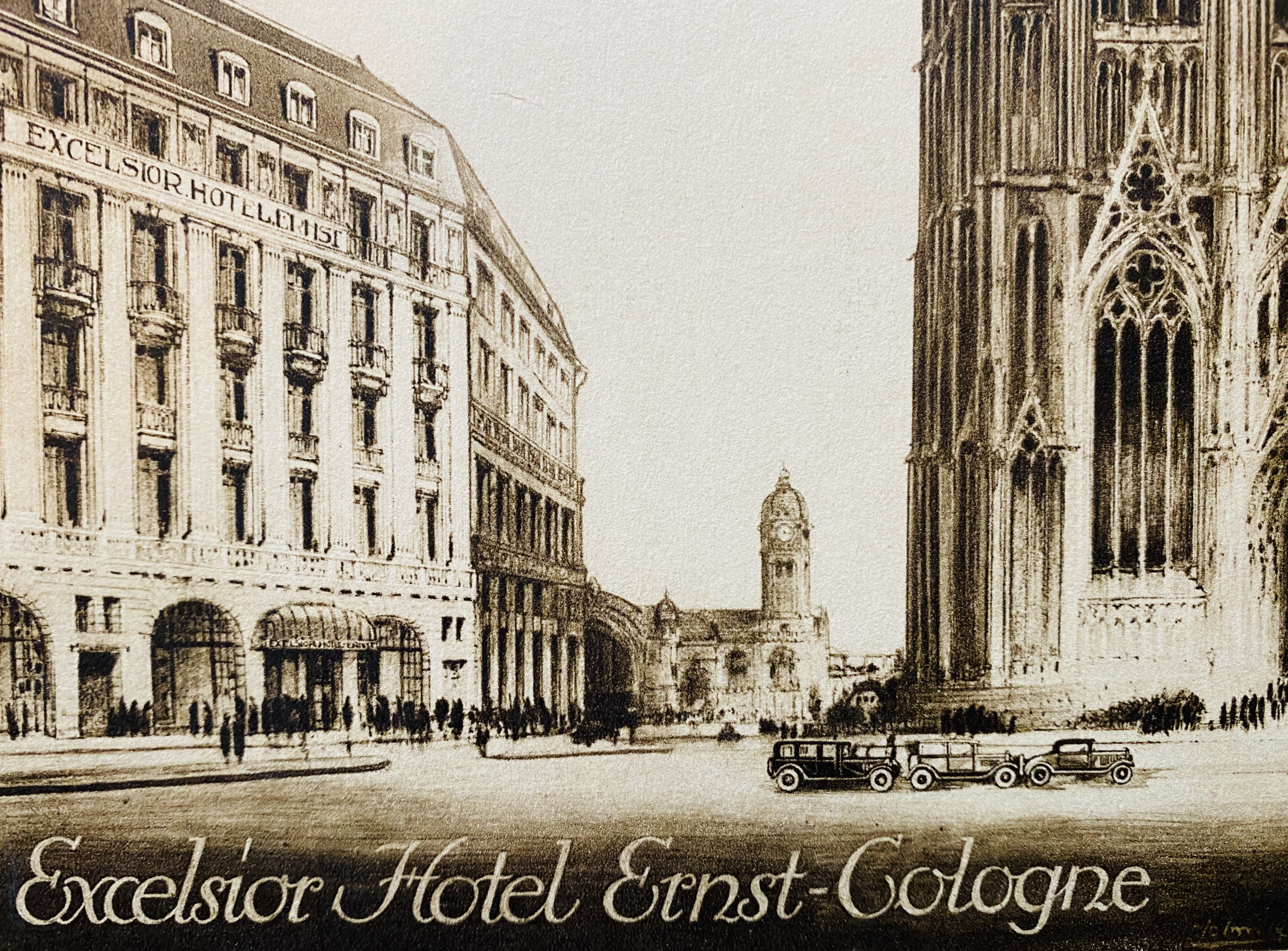
Circa 1930s

The Excelsior Hotel Ernst is a historic hotel established in 1863 in Innenstadt, Cologne, Germany, adjacent to Cologne Cathedral.

== History ==
The Hotel Ernst opened on 16 May 1863. It was built by Carl Ernst, who sold the hotel to Friedrich Kracht in 1871. In 1875, Kracht died and his wife and son, Carl Kracht, assumed operation of the hotel. The hotel became a favorite haunt of Cologne's elite, and in 1884, Carl Kracht was honored by the city with an appointment as Prince of the Cologne Carnival.

In 1889, Carl Kracht married Emma Pauline Baur of the Swiss Hoteliers family Baur, who owned both the famous Hotel Baur au Lac and the Savoy Baur en Ville. Carl Kracht and his family lived in Zurich and he managed the Hotel Baur au Lac. After his wedding, he appointed a general manager to take care of the Hotel Ernst's operations.

From 1908 to 1910 the hotel was entirely rebuilt. It reopened as the Excelsior Hotel Ernst with unparalleled luxury for the time: 60 of the 200 bedrooms had a private bathroom. In 1918, after World War I, the British Army moved into the hotel and used it as their headquarters during the occupation of the Rhineland. On 31 December 1926, the Excelsior Hotel Ernst celebrated its reopening, after the British army left. Portions of the 1927 silent film The Beggar from Cologne Cathedral were filmed at the hotel.

During World War II, the upper levels of the hotel were damaged by air raids in 1943, but the first four floors continued operating through 1944. The hotel's manager, Max Mattheus, abandoned the hotel with the remaining staff on 2 May 1945, pinning a note to the front that it was Swiss property. The hotel was again requisitioned by the British Army. The hotel reopened after the currency reforms resulting from the introduction of the Deutsche Mark in June 1948.

In 1986 a new wing was constructed, the "Neubau", with 29 rooms and suites. All renovations were done under the supervision of the interior designer Count Siegwart Pilati. In addition to French cuisine restaurant Hanse Stube, a second restaurant was opened in 2001: the taku, offers Asian cuisine in a contemporary atmosphere. In 2007, 45 rooms were turned into 35 more spacious rooms in the "Hanse Flügel".

Excelsior Hotel Ernst is member of The Leading Hotels of the World and family Kracht-Roulet is still owner of the hotel. Since November 2012 Henning Matthiesen is the general manager of the hotel.

The hotel has hosted many famous guests, including Kaiser William I and American artist Andy Warhol.

== See also ==
- Dom-Hotel, Cologne
