= Hilton Munich Airport =

Airport hotel in Munich, Bavaria, Germany

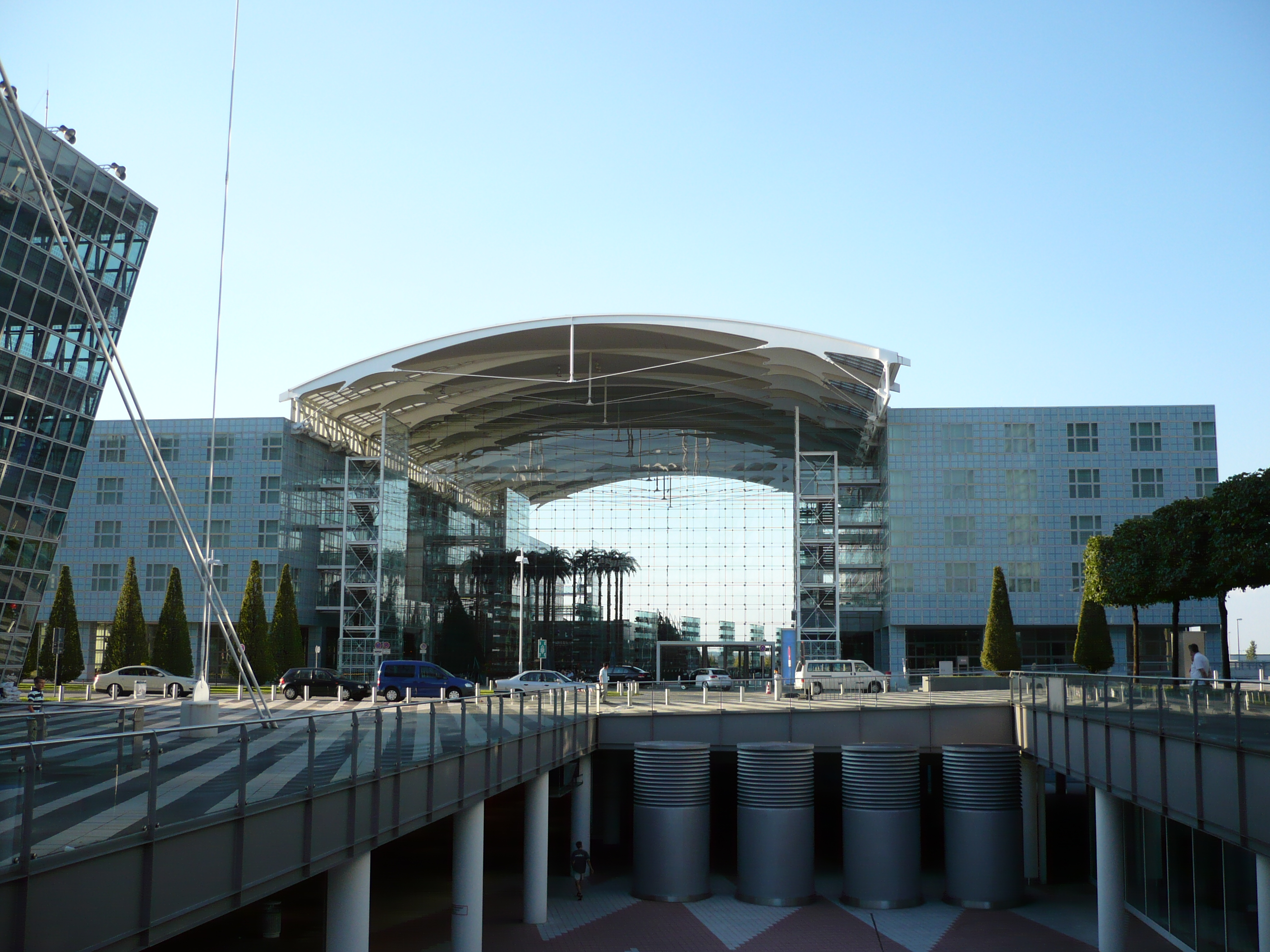
- Interactive map of the Hilton Munich Airport area
- Former names: Kempinski Hotel Airport München

General information
- Type: Hotel
- Location: Terminalstrasse Mitte 20, 85356, Munich, Germany
- Coordinates: 48°21′19.57″N 11°47′19.11″E
- Opened: 17 May 1994 (Kempinski); 1 January 2014 (Hilton)

Other information
- Number of rooms: 551

The Hilton Munich Airport (until 31 December 2014 Kempinski Hotel Airport Munich) is a hotel located on the grounds of Munich Airport, between Terminals 1 and 2, near the Munich Airport Center business facility.

== History ==
Following a construction period of 20 months, the hotel opened on 17 May 1994 as Kempinski, two years after the airport went into operation. The architect of the hotel is German-born Helmut Jahn of the Chicago-based Murphy/Jahn Architectural Group. The hotel's grand plaza is a 24- metre high and 1400 square metre large atrium hall with a glass roof and decorated with palm trees (18 metres tall) from Florida. Green cubes and grown-over pyramid shapes continue the outer landscape surrounding the airport.

On 1 January 2015, the hotel was taken over by Hilton Hotels & Resorts. In March 2017, a 7-story extension building was completed adding 162 rooms spanning over 6 floors and new office spaces on the first floor. The existing office facilities on the ground floor of the old building were converted into conference facilities.

== See also ==
- List of hotels in Germany
