= Grand Hotel Bellevue (Berlin) =

Hotel in Berlin, Germany

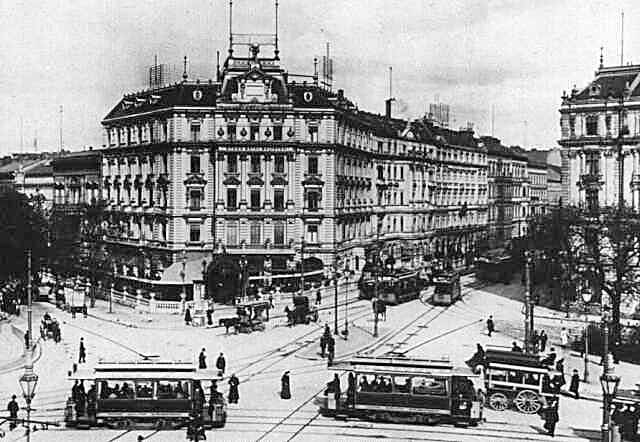

- Location in Berlin

General information
- Location: Potsdamer Platz, Berlin, Germany
- Coordinates: 52°30′36″N 13°22′34″E
- Opening: 1888
- Closed: 1928

The Grand Hotel Bellevue was a hotel on the Potsdamer Platz in Berlin, Germany. It was designed by architect Ludwig Heim and opened in 1888. Initially it was called the Hôtel du Parc, later it was also known as the Thiergarten-Hotel. The hotel was demolished in 1928 and Erich Mendelsohn's modern Columbushaus skyscraper was constructed on the site, opening in 1932. It was demolished in 1957 and the site remained vacant until after German reunification, when the Beisheim Center was built there.

The Hôtel du Parc is one of the locations in Theodor Fontane's novel, Cécile.
