= Zum Roten Bären =

Hotel in Freiburg, Germany

Coordinates: 47.993267°N 7.853997°E

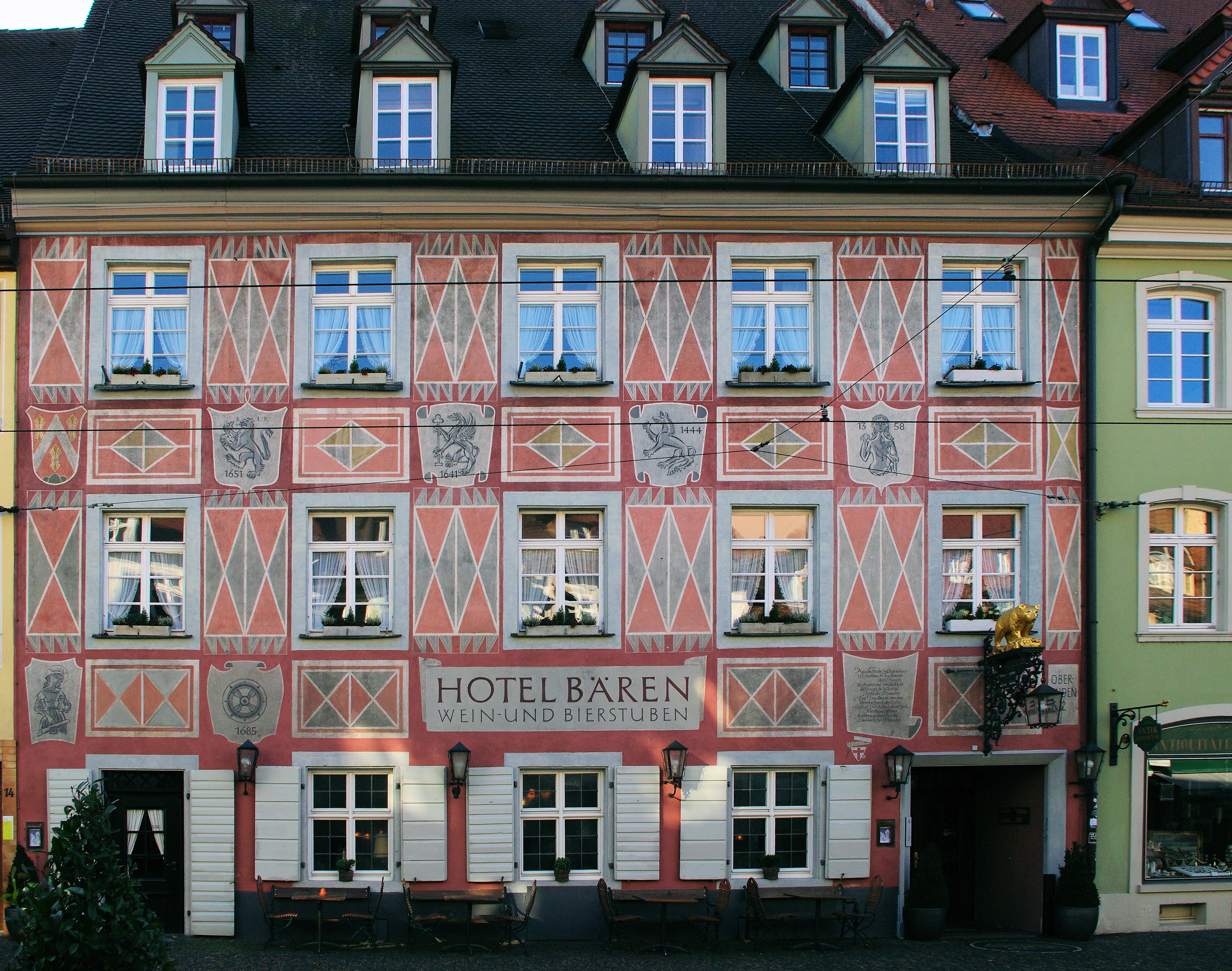
The hotel Zum Roten Bären

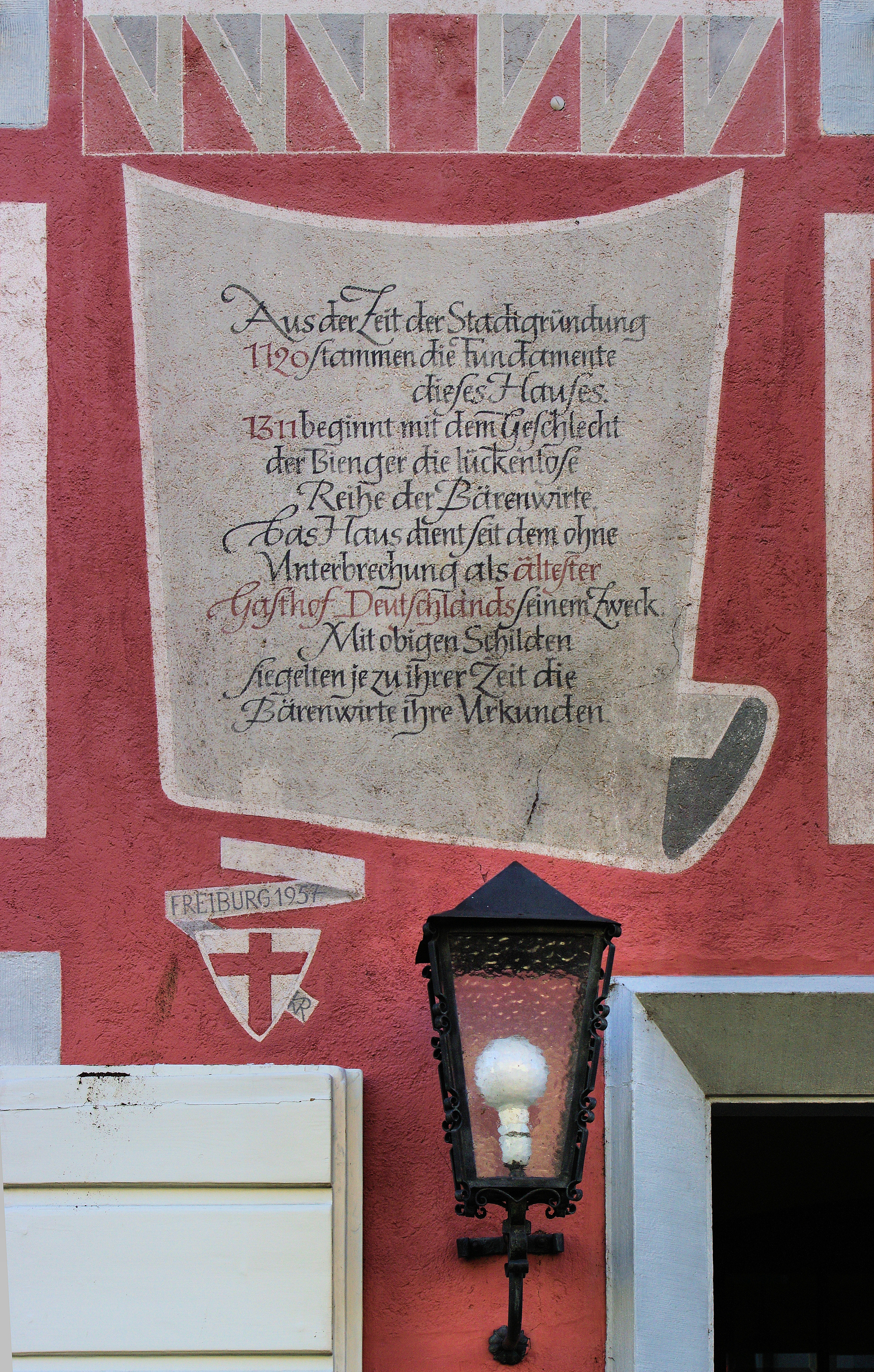
Partial history on the wall on the front of the building

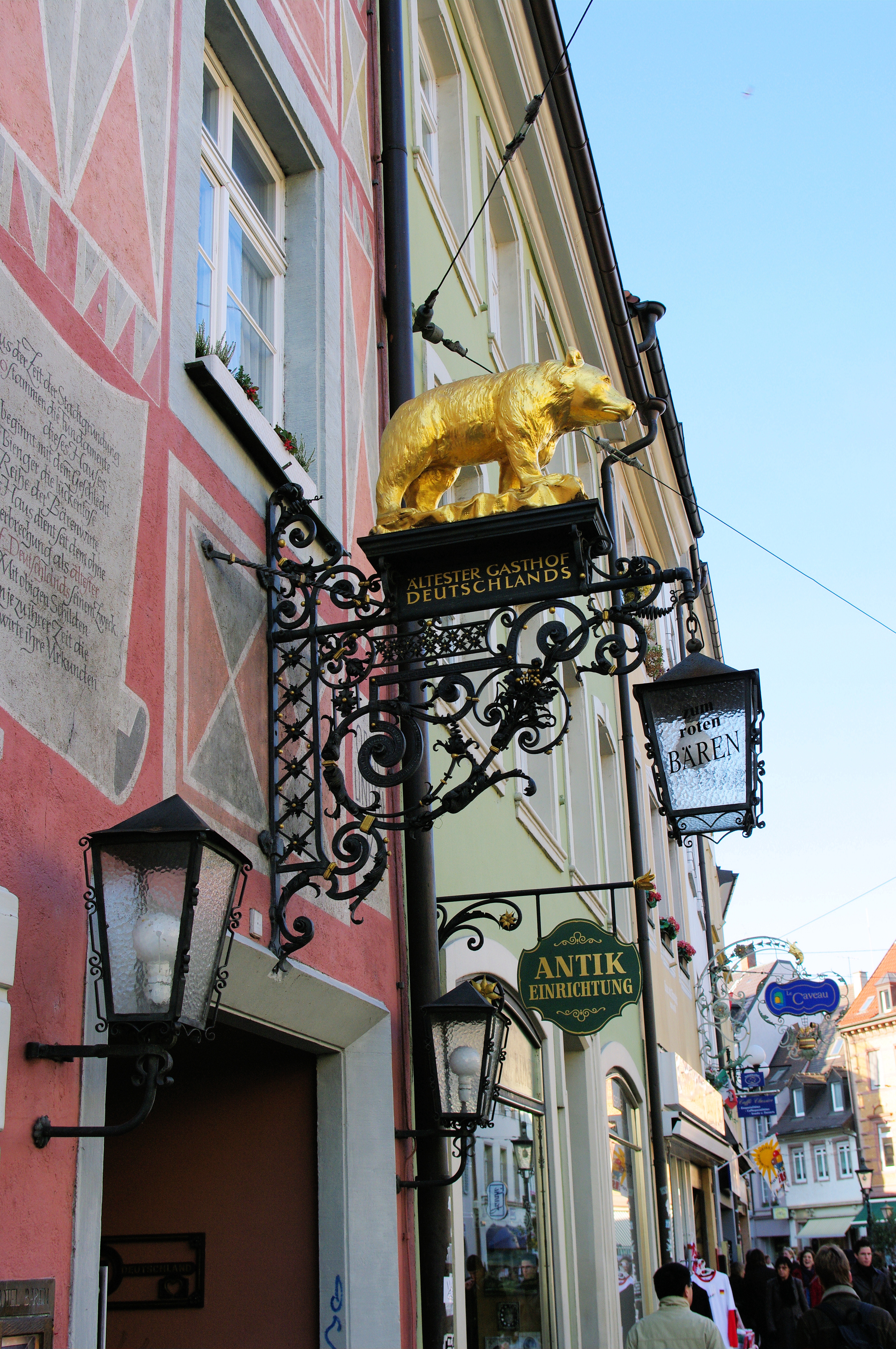
Restaurant sign

Zum roten Bären (translation: The Red Bear) is a hotel and restaurant in Freiburg, Germany; it has a claim to be the oldest hotel in Germany and Europe. The foundations of the hotel predate the founding of the town of Freiburg by the dukes of the House of Zähringen in 1120.

Records show that site of Zum roten Bären was already used as an inn in the 12th century. The first landlord for whom there is written documentation is Hanmann Bienger, whose name was listed in a land register of the nearby monastery of Adelhausen in March 1387. Many of the landlords were also court officials and councilmen of the city of Freiburg and often also guild masters. For some time, the guild hall of the shoemakers was located at Zum Roten Bären, as can be seen in one of the windows of Freiburg Cathedral. After French soldiers damaged an older building during the Rhine campaign of 1713, the building visible today was built by landlord Andreas Pflug in the Baroque style and completed in 1718. Parts of the external walls and cellars remain from the original 12th-century building.

Current managers Christoph Glück and Christian Böhler—who bought the hotel in 2017—are the 51st landlords.

== See also ==
- List of oldest companies
