= Wertheim =

Wertheim may refer to:

- Wertheim (surname)
- Wertheim (company), a company that manufactures vacuum cleaners
- Wertheim (department store), a chain of German department stores
- Wertheim & Co., an investment firm
- Wertheim am Main, Baden-Württemberg, Germany
- Wertheim National Wildlife Refuge, a protected wetlands on Long Island, New York
- Wertheim Piano, an Australian brand of piano
- Wertheim-Meigs operation, a surgical procedure for the treatment of cervical cancer

== See also ==
- Wertheimer, a surname
- Wertheim Gallery
- Wertheim effect
- Wertheim surgery
