= Wertheimer =

Wertheimer is an Ashkenazi Jewish surname. Notable people with the surname include:

- Akiba Israel Wertheimer (1778–1835), rabbi
- Alain and Gérard Wertheimer, French Jewish billionaire owners of Chanel
  - Wertheimer et Frère, partnership of the two brothers
- Arjeh Yehuda Wertheimer (1862–1937), known as Constantin Brunner, German-Jewish philosopher
- Asher Wertheimer (1843–1918), British art dealer who commissioned the Wertheimer portraits
- Egon Ranshofen-Wertheimer (1894–1957), Austrian and German diplomat, journalist, jurist and political scientist
- Esther Wertheimer (1926–2016), Polish architect
- François Wertheimer (born 1947), French singer
- Fred Wertheimer (born 1939), American political activist
- Gustav Wertheimer (1847–1904), Austrian artist
- Haim Ernst Wertheimer (1893–1978), German-born Israeli biochemist
- Hedy Wertheimer (1907–1976), Austrian-American swimmer
- Jack Wertheimer, American historian
- Jacques Wertheimer (1911–1996), father of Pierre
- John Wertheimer (1799–1883), English printer
- Linda Wertheimer (born 1943), American broadcast journalist
- Martha Wertheimer (1890–1942), German journalist, writer and rescuer of Jewish children from Nazi forces
- Max Wertheimer (1880–1943), Prague-born Gestalt psychologist
- Michael Wertheimer (1927–2022), psychologist, son of Max
- Michael Wertheimer (born 1957), American cryptologic mathematician
- Mildred S. Wertheimer (1896–1937), American political scientist
- Peter Wertheimer (1947–2020), Romanian-Israeli jazz musician
- Pierre Wertheimer (1888–1965), French businessman, co-founder of Chanel
- Samson Wertheimer (1658–1724), German-Hungarian and Austrian rabbi, philanthropist
- Solomon Aaron Wertheimer (1866–1935), rabbi
- Stef Wertheimer (1926–2025), Israeli industrialist
- Yair Wertheimer (born 1955), Israeli tennis player

== Also ==
- Fredric Wertham (originally Friedrich Ignatz Wertheimer, 1895–1981), German-American psychiatrist and author.
- Ella Winter (originally Wertheimer, 1898–1980), Australian-British journalist and activist.
- Pierre Wertheim (alias Pierre Armand Wertheimer, 1888–1971), French World War I flying ace

== See also ==
- Wertheim
- Wertheim (surname)
