= Yigal Elad =

Israeli plant pathologist known for his work on biological control of plant diseases

- Born: 1952 (age 73–74); Tel Aviv, Israel
- Citizenship: Israeli
- Education: Hebrew University of Jerusalem (B.Sc., M.Sc., Ph.D.)
- Occupations: Plant pathologist, academic
- Employer: Volcani Institute (ARO)
- Known for: Plant diseases, Biological control; Botrytis; Trichoderma; Trichodex; Integrated disease management; Cultural control; Induced resistance; Foliar plant pathogens; Powdery mildew; Downy mildew
- Awards: Fellow, APS (2010); Fellow, ISPP (2023); Researcher of the Year, Volcani (1999); Life Achievements Prize, Volcani (2018)

Yigal Elad (born 1952) is an Israeli plant pathologist and full professor at the Hebrew University of Jerusalem's faculty of agriculture. He is known for his work on biological control of plant diseases, particularly the development of a Trichoderma harzianum biocontrol agent (designated T39) that was commercialized as Trichodex, the first Trichoderma product registered for controlling Botrytis cinerea and Sclerotinia sclerotiorum in grape vineyards and greenhouse crops.

== Education ==
Elad was born in Tel Aviv in 1952. He earned a B.Sc. with honors in agriculture in 1977 from the Hebrew University of Jerusalem's Faculty of Agriculture in Rehovot. He completed an M.Sc. with honors in 1978, with a thesis on biological control of Sclerotium rolfsii with Trichoderma harzianum, supervised by Ilan Chet, Yaacov Katan, and Yigal Henis. He received his Ph.D. in 1983 with a thesis on the mechanism of biological control of soil-borne plant pathogens by Trichoderma harzianum, supervised by Ilan Chet. where his work on Trichoderma and Rhizoctonia established the role of cell-wall degrading enzymes in biocontrol. He completed his first postdoctoral position at Colorado State University in 1983–1984, working with Prof. Ralph Baker on the interaction of Pseudomonas with Fusarium species. Elad then undertook a second postdoc (1984–1985) with Prof. Ilan Chet at the Hebrew University on biocontrol of Pythium aphanidermatum with bacteria.

== Career ==
Elad joined the Volcani Institute in 1985 and has spent his career in the Department of Plant Pathology and Weed Research. He served as Head of the Department of Plant Pathology (1998–2002) and as Head of the Institute of Plant Protection (2014–2017). From 2002 to 2010, he also served as head of the Plant Pathology Unit at the Istituto Agrario di S. Michele all’Adige (IASMA) in Trentino, Italy. From 2006 to 2015 he was the Scientific Manager of Central and North Arava Research and Development.

He holds the rank of Full Professor at the Hebrew University of Jerusalem's Faculty of Agriculture, where he has taught phytopathology courses on a voluntary basis. He conducted sabbatical research at IPO-DLO in Wageningen, the Netherlands (1992), at Birkbeck College, University of London (2002–2003), and at Lincoln University in New Zealand (2003).[2] Elad taught numerous M.Sc. and Ph.D. students, including foreign scholars and Israeli Jewish and Arab scholars and collaborated with researchers in Europe, the United States, and Colombia.

== Biological control of soilborne diseases ==
As a young researcher Elad carried out the early studies on biocontrol of soilborne diseases, emphasizing mechanisms of control by Trichoderma harzianum and application of biocontrol under field conditions. This publication was selected for a 2025 virtual issue of Phytopathology for sustained citation over time. It was selected by the APS journal Phytopathology as "a landmark study that has shaped the field of plant pathology".

== Trichodex and biological control ==
A Trichoderma harzianum isolate developed by Elad, designated T39, was patented, registered worldwide, and commercialized under the trade name Trichodex by Makhteshim Agan Industries (now Adama). It became the first Trichoderma biocontrol agent ever registered for controlling Botrytis cinerea (grey mould) and Sclerotinia sclerotiorum in grape vineyards and greenhouse crops while affecting other plant diseases owing to its distinct mode of action.

== Management of foliar diseases of plants ==
Elad's research group studied the problems of resistance of pathogens to fungicides, integrated management to avoid failures of disease control, and developed disease management approaches using cultural methods (agro-techniques), calcium, potassium, magnesium and other nutritional elements, physical treatments, biochar, entomopathogenic agents, and resistance inducers. The group of Elad studied the mechanisms by which the various means of control affect plant diseases. This work led to integrated management systems used in greenhouses and open fields, reducing reliance on chemical fungicides and contributed to slowing the development of fungicide resistance.

== Biochar effect on plant diseases ==
Elad and his colleagues were among the first to research biochar use against plant diseases. Foliar and soilborne diseases were controlled and the mode of action was based as induced resistance that stemmed from microbial changes in soil and specific compounds that originated from the biochar.

== Botrytis research and textbooks ==
Elad organized leading Botrytis symposia and co-edited the reference textbook Botrytis: Biology, Pathology and Control (Springer, 2004) with three co-editors, followed by an expanded successor, Botrytis — the Fungus, the Pathogen and its Management in Agricultural Systems (Springer, 2016, with S. Fillinger). These volumes are reference works on Botrytis.

== Climate change and other research ==
Elad headed major research projects on the effects of climate change on plant–pathogen interactions, diseases in vegetable and herbal crops, the commercialization of induced resistance technologies, and gene editing for disease resistance.

== Induced resistance ==
Elad's research established the role of induced resistance with various inducers that were studied for their effect on plant diseases in dicotyledon- and monocotyledon- type plants, against foliar and soilborne diseases that are caused by necrotrophic and biotrophic pathogens. Among the pathogens are fungi, oomycetes, bacteria and viruses. Resistance was established also against insect pests and mites. The research with his colleagues led to findings of melanoidines and L-phenylalanine as resistance inducers, the latter was also developed as a product for disease and pest control named NutraFend.

== Professional service ==
Elad served as President of the Israeli Society of Phytopathology (2009–2011) and as Honorary President (2019–2022). He was convenor of the Integrated Control of Plant Pathogens Working Group of the IOBC/WPRS (International Organisation for Biological and Integrated Control/) for two terms (1998–2008) and served as a member of the IOBC/WPRS council (2009–2013). He was elected twice to lead the IOBC working group on biocontrol agents for plant diseases and also served as liaison officer for this group (1998–2014). In these capacities he led or co-organized a series of IOBC/WPRS conference-workshops across Europe, with 150 to 250 scientists attending each. Eight of these are documented in the IOBC/WPRS bulletin series:

- Sevilla, Spain, 2001. “Biocontrol Agents Modes of Action and Their Interaction with Other Means of Control.” Proceedings edited by Y. Elad, S. Freeman and E. Monte. IOBC/WPRS Bulletin Vol. 24(3), 376 pp.
- Wageningen, The Netherlands, 2002. “Influence of Abiotic and Biotic Factors on Biocontrol Agents.” Proceedings edited by Y. Elad, J. Köhl and D. Shtienberg. IOBC/WPRS Bulletin Vol. 25(10), 418 pp.
- San Mechele All'Adige, Trentino, Italy, 2004. “Management of Plant Diseases and Arthropod Pests by BCAs and their Integration in Agricultural Systems.” Proceedings edited by Y. Elad, I. Pertot and A. Enkegaard. IOBC/WPRS Bulletin Vol. 27(8), 431 pp.
- Spa, Belgium, September 6–10, 2006. “Fundamental and Practical Approaches to Increase Biocontrol Efficacy.” Proceedings edited by Y. Elad, M. Ongena, M. Höfte, and M. H. Jijakli. IOBC/WPRS Bulletin Vol. 30(6), 2007.
- Interlaken, Switzerland, 2009. “Molecular Tools for Understanding and Improving Biocontrol.” Proceedings edited by Y. Elad, M. Maurhofer, C. Keel, C. Gessler and B. Duffy. IOBC/WPRS Bulletin Vol. 43(1–2), 389 pp.
- Graz, Austria, June 7–10, 2010. Working Group “Biological Control of Fungal and Bacterial Plant Pathogens.” Proceedings edited by I. Pertot, Y. Elad, C. Gessler and A. Cini, IOBC-WPRS Bulletin Vol. 78, 2012.
- Reims, France, June 24–27, 2012. Working Group “Biological Control of Fungal and Bacterial Plant Pathogens.” Proceedings edited by I. Pertot, Y. Elad, E. Ait Barka and C. Clement. IOBC-WPRS Bulletin Vol. 86, 2013. ISBN 978-92-9067-264-7, XIX + 368 pp.
- Uppsala, Sweden, June 15–18, 2014. XIII Meeting, “Biocontrol of Plant Diseases: From the Field to the Laboratory and Back Again.” Proceedings edited by I. Pertot, D. Funck Jensen, M. Hökeberg, M. Karlsson, I. Sundh and Y. Elad. IOBC/WPRS Bulletin Vol. 115, 2016.

== Awards and honors ==
- 1999: Researcher of the Year, Volcani Institute
- 2010: Fellow, American Phytopathological Society (APS)
- 2018: Life Achievements Prize, Volcani Institute
- 2023: Fellow, International Society for Plant Pathology (ISPP)
