= Renoma =

Historic shopping mall in Wrocław, Poland

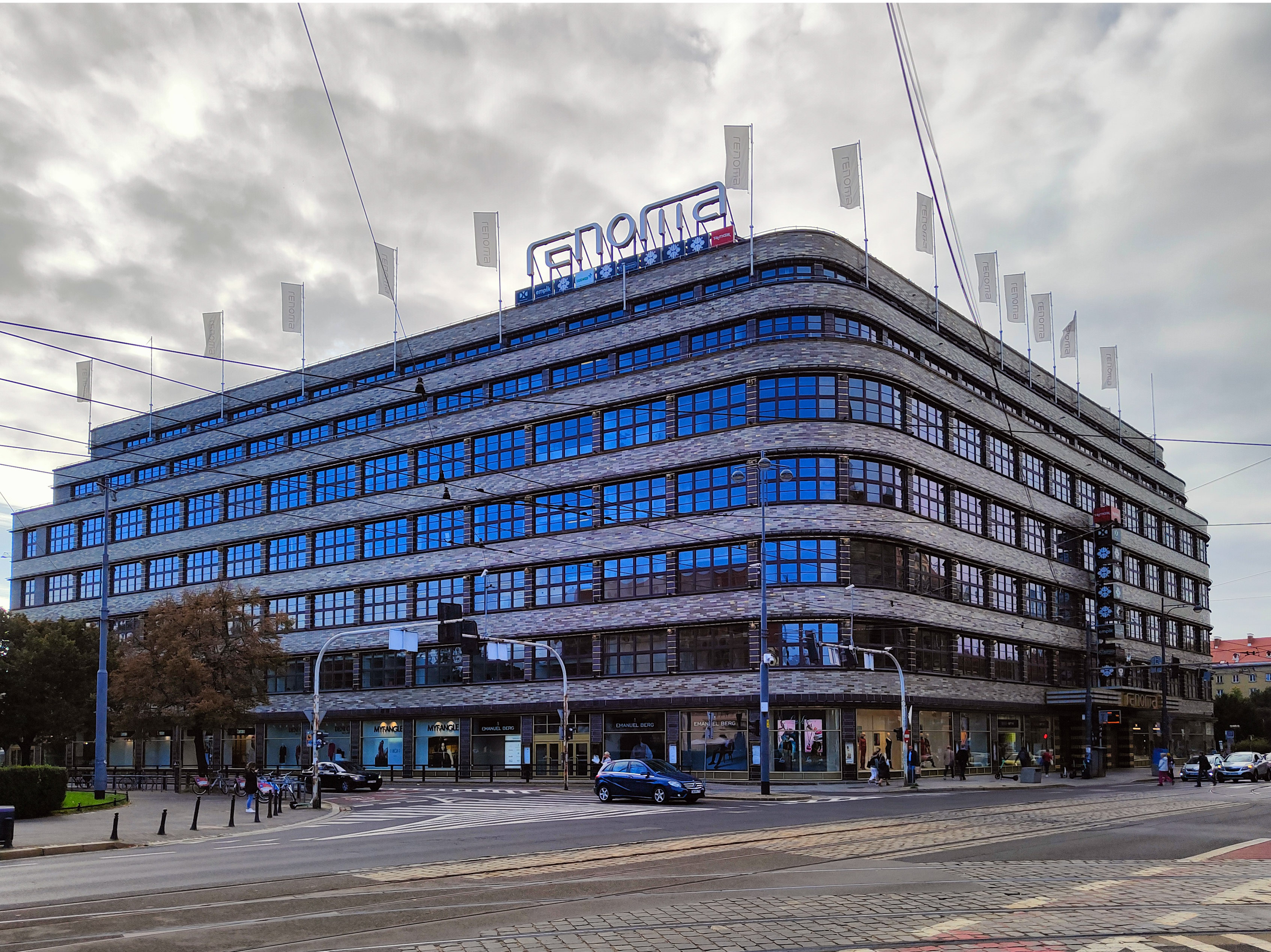
- Former names: Wertheim, Powszechny Dom Towarowy, PDT

General information
- Type: Shopping mall, ex-department store
- Architectural style: Modernism
- Location: Wrocław, Poland
- Address: 40 Świdnicka Street
- Coordinates: 51°06′13″N 17°01′52″E
- Opened: 15 April 1930
- Renovated: 2002-2006
- Client: Wertheim
- Owner: Centrum Development & Investments

Design and construction
- Architect(s): Hermann Dernburg

Website
- www.renoma-wroclaw.pl

Renoma (formerly Powszechny Dom Towarowy Renoma, Wertheim) is a shopping mall in Wrocław, Poland. Inaugurated in 1930, it was once the largest and most luxurious department store in the city. It is situated on Świdnicka Street, which connects the Market Square with Piłsudski Street in the historical city centre. Renoma was reopened on 25 April 2009, after major modernisation works.

== History ==
=== Pre-war ===
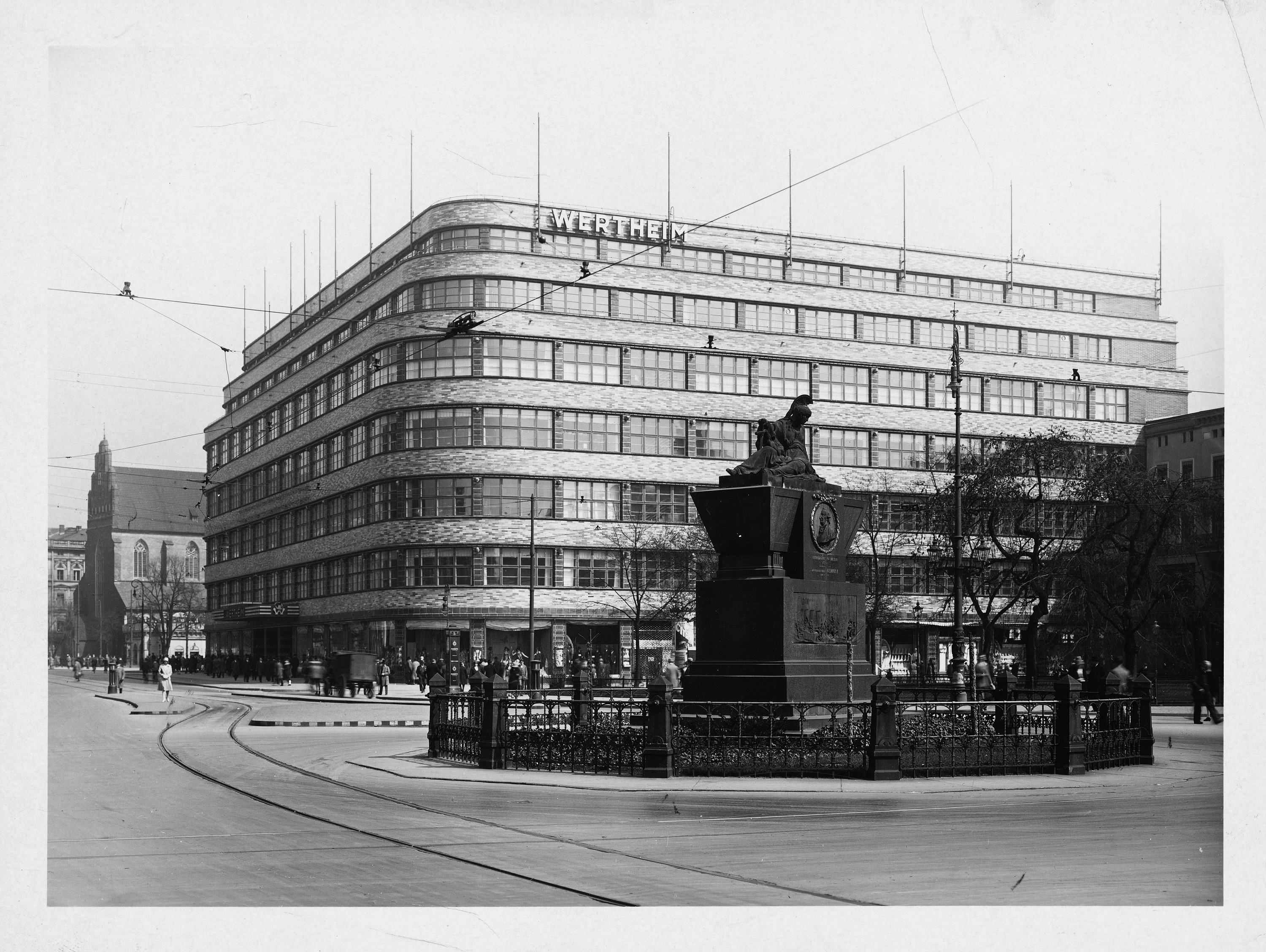
Wertheim in 1929

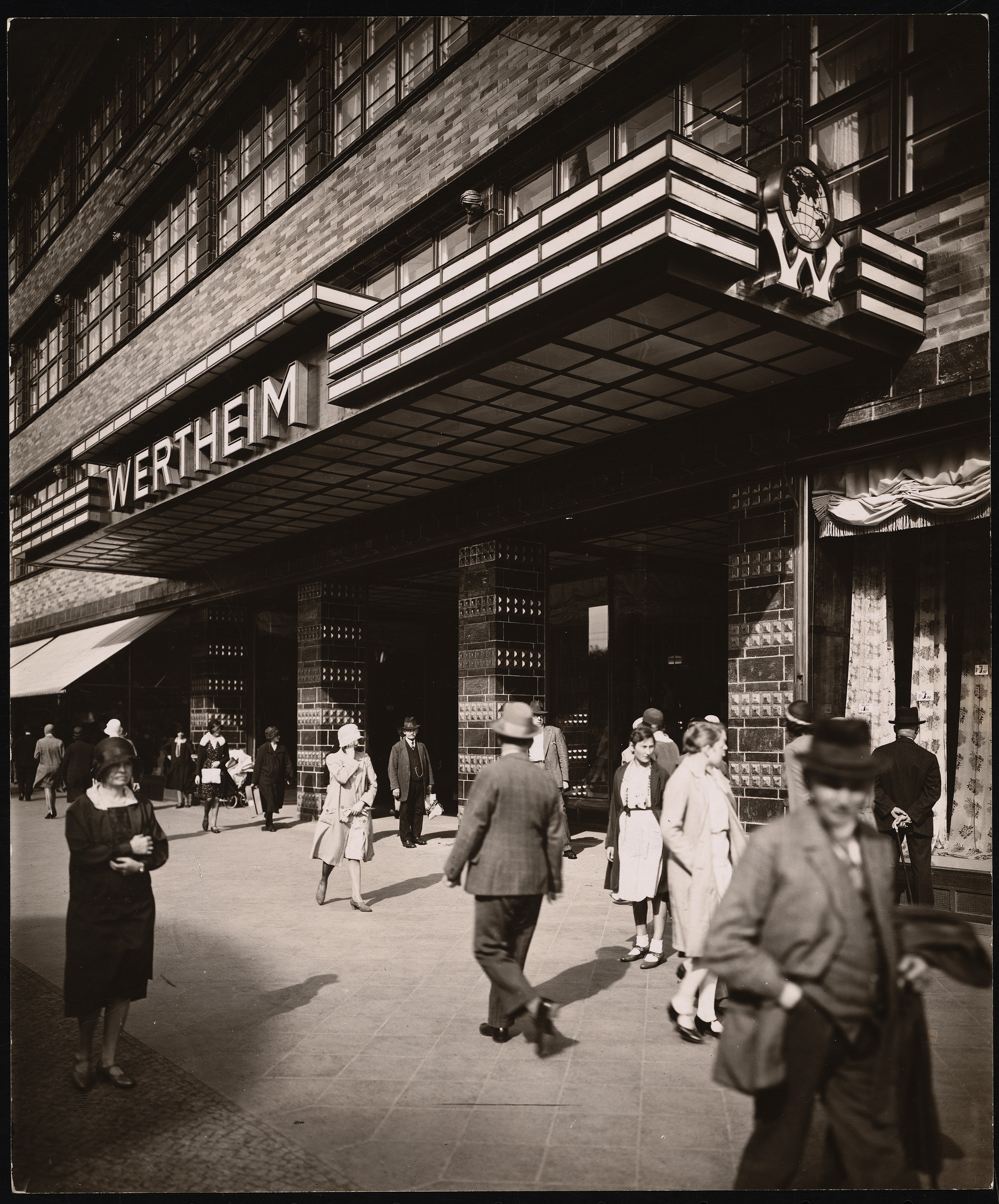
Wertheim in 1929

In 1927, the Wertheim consortium in Berlin held a contest to design a department store in the city centre of Breslau (Wrocław). Several renowned local architects submitted their projects, including Erich Mendelsohn, Werry Roth, Theodor Effenberg, and Herman Dernburg. Dernburg's concept, which was based on a steel framework, won the contest. The resulting department store was planned to be the largest in Breslau, covering 35,000 square meters, while also being the largest building constructed with a steel framework in Europe at that time.

To complete the project, several buildings, including a prosperous hotel and 12 tenements, were demolished. The works were finished in three years, and the Wertheim Department Store opened on 2 April 1930.

Thanks to Dernsburg's modern architecture, spacious stores, and innovative use of escalators, the department store became a successful project in the Lower Silesia region. One of the most popular features among customers was the well-stocked Toy Store, which included a display of moving toy trains. Although there was an idea to expand the store into Salvatorplatz (modern-day Plac Czysty), it was dismissed due to economic downturn.

The Wertheim family, who owned the store, did not enjoy its success for long. When the Nazis came to power in Germany, a series of antisemitic actions forced them to sell the store to AWAG (Allgemeine Warenhaus Gesellschaft). AWAG limited the store's retail activity and converted the famous luxury restaurant with panoramic views of the city into a military canteen. On 12 March 1945, the building sustained heavy damage during bombing. Despite burning for several days, the steel framework and some ceramic elevations managed to survive.

=== Post-war ===
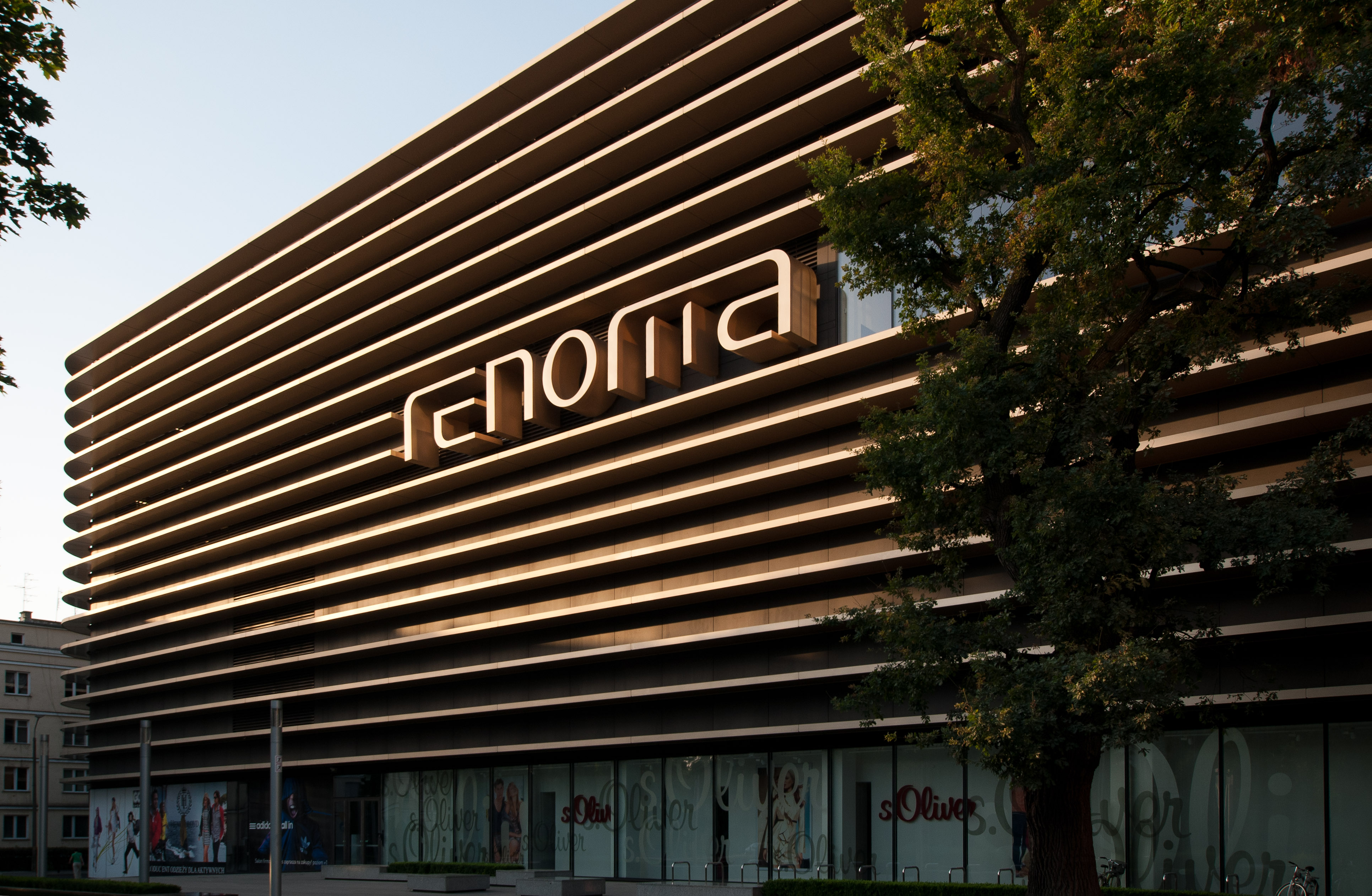
The contemporary addition at the rear.

Renoma was renovated soon after the end of the war, and in 1947, a new department store named Powszechny Dom Towarowy, also known as Pedet, was opened in its place. Despite losing its pre-war glamour, it became the largest department store in Poland. The ground floor housed food stores, a pharmacy, and a ceramics shop, while the first floor featured the first fabrics store. Furthermore, in 1948, the store expanded its offerings by opening a confectionery outlet and a kindergarten. The Słowo Polskie newspaper held a competition to name the store, with Renoma ('Renown') being chosen as the winning name due to its allusion to the pre-war fame and glamour of the store.

Renoma was added to the heritage list in 1977. In the late 1990s, Renoma was privatised and underwent modernisation in 1998-1999, with the first floor being named Galeria Centrum. From 2005-2009, the new owner, Centrum Development & Investments, performed a thorough modernisation. CDI strictly reinvented the original concept of the building and expanded it according to the original idea from the 1930s. Modernisation was guided by restorers. The new Renoma opened on 25 April 2009. Hewlett-Packard currently rents space on the second, fourth, fifth, and sixth floors for their outsourcing projects.

== Architecture ==
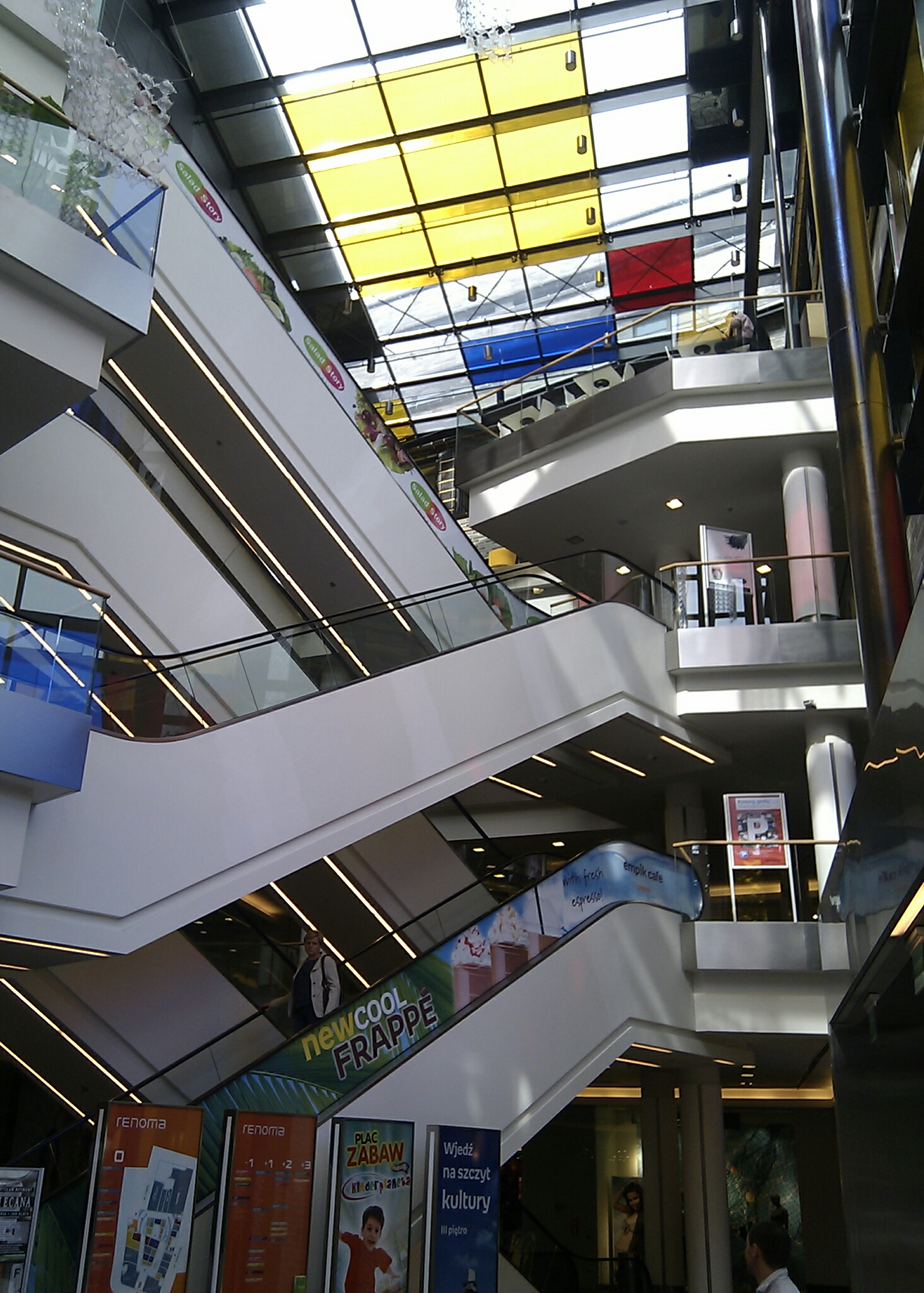
Escalators in Renoma

In 1928, Herman Dernburg's project won first prize in the architectural competition for the department store building design. Dernburg utilised classical solutions, incorporating two large courtyards with glass ceilings on the first floor to provide ample natural light and air circulation indoors. The building features a horizontal elevation layout with seven stories. The ground floor boasts large display windows, while the upper floors have horizontal windows. Both corners facing Świdnicka Street were rounded. The store's façade features rows of windows and decorative cornices below them. Special attention was given to elevation details. Façade elements such as ceramic cornices, human head sculptures, fleurons, and masts were designed by Ulrich Nitschke and Hans Klakow. The main entrance faces Świdnicka Street. The ground floor and four upper floors are dedicated to retail, while the two highest floors house offices and food service areas.

=== Modernisation ===
The design work for the extension of Renoma and the renovation of the pre-war building began in 2005. The investor aimed to restore the design of the former Wertheim while also extending the existing building. The development proved to be a significant task guided by conservation efforts. The renovation of Renoma's historical building focused on preserving the internal layout and restoring the original façade, including its characteristic details such as ceramic tiles, decorative elements, and gold-decorated heads and flowers. The conservator of monuments closely supervised the renovation process.

== Awards and nominations ==
The modernised Renoma mall has been awarded a number of prizes and nominations including:

- SARP Award of the Year conferred by the Association of Polish Architects (2009)
- CEE Retail Real Estate Awards: 1st place In the category: Best modernisation of the year (2010)
- The best Architectural Project of the year 2009. The prize was awarded by the users of scyscrapercity.com portal (2010)
- Finalist of the „Building of the Year 2010” competition, organised at the International Architecture Festival in Barcelona (Convencions Internacional de Barcelona - CCIB)
- Mies van der Rohe Award nomination (2011)

== Bibliography ==
- Encyklopedia Wrocławia. Wydawnictwo Dolnośląskie. 2006. ISBN 83-7384-561-5.
- Maciejewska, Beata (2010). Spacerownik Wroclawski book. the History Museum in Wrocław. ISBN 978-83-7552-471-0.
