= Georg Wertheim =

German businessman

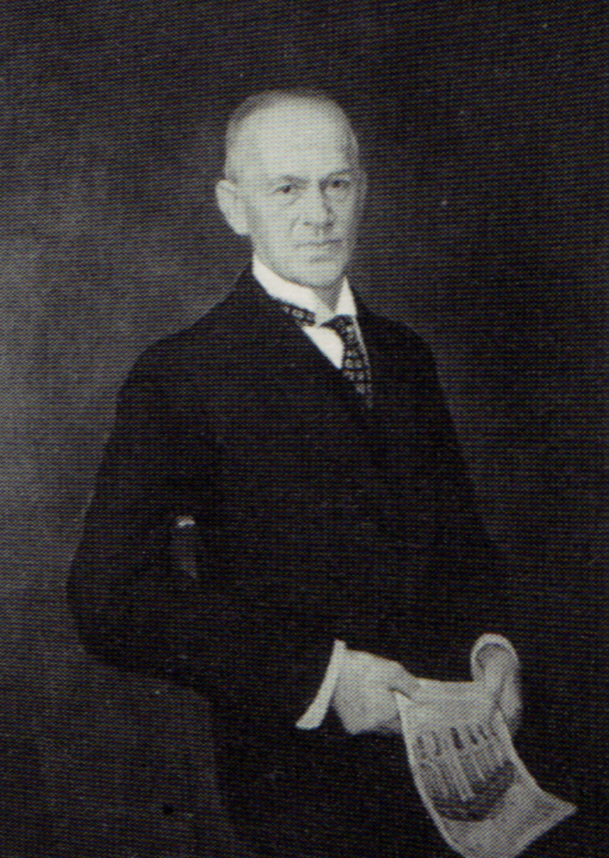
- Wertheim
- Born: 11 February 1857; Stralsund, Kingdom of Prussia, German Confederation
- Died: 31 December 1939 (aged 82); Berlin, Germany
- Occupation: Merchant

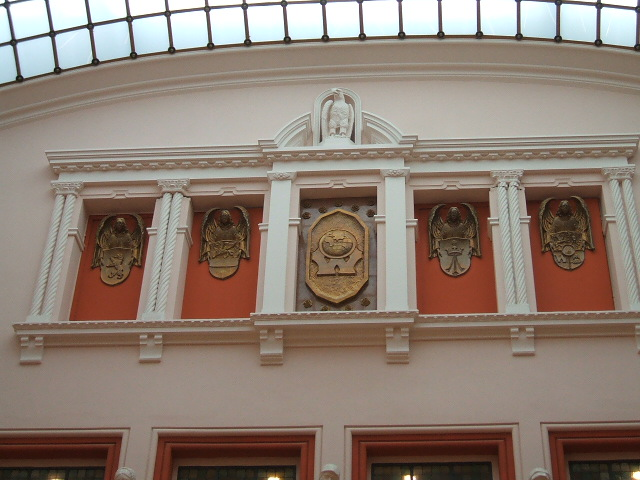
Inside the first Wertheim store in Stralsund, Western Pomerania

Georg Wertheim (11 February 1857 in Stralsund – 31 December 1939 in Berlin) was a Jewish German merchant and founder of the popular Wertheim chain of department stores.

== Early years ==
Wertheim grew up in Stralsund. After being an apprentice at Wolff and Apolant, Wertheim along with his brother Hugo, took over in 1876 their parents' (Abraham and Ida Wertheim) haberdashery, founded in 1875.

Georg Wertheim was born into a Jewish family in Stralsund, Germany, in 1857. Although he converted to Christianity in 1906, the Nazi regime still classified him as Jewish under the Nuremberg Laws implemented in 1935. Despite his conversion, Wertheim faced persecution during the Nazi era, leading to the forced transfer (“Aryanization”) of his department store chain to non-Jewish ownership.

The two brothers quickly brought new ideas into the shop: customers were allowed to replace goods, the price of a good was no longer debatable but reliable, and purchases were made strictly with cash. This concept was successful, and after the opening of another branch in Rostock, the first branch in Berlin (Rosenthaler Straße) was founded in 1885.

Wertheim quickly realised the changing demand of the growing city in the period of industrialisation and in 1890 opened the first real department store on Moritzplatz/Oranienstraße in Berlin-Kreuzberg. The shop floor was more generous in size and permitted more elaborate presentation of products for sale, products were put on display, and longer runs allowed lower prices.

However, it increasingly appeared that the limitations, which arose due to the shops' locations within old housing: the rooms were not especially large and made further expansion scarcely possible.

Georg Wertheim furthered his education at the Berlin Art Academy in Sonntagskursen and, with the previously unknown architect Alfred Messel, began to develop the concept of a building designed specifically for the sale of goods. The store was established in Leipzig Street in 1892, and in 1894 began the sale of goods in the first purpose planned and built department store on the Oranienstraße.

== Department Store ==
The well-known Wertheim Kaufhaus on Leipziger Platz, which was opened in 1896, went a step further. Wertheim wanted upmarket customers, who until then had held back from patronising his department stores, to have all their needs satisfied under one roof. Because of this the new building on the busiest square of the city was soon opened. In the following years, Messel had to constantly expand the building. The Wertheim store on Leipziger Platz was compared with Harrods in London and the Galeries Lafayette in Paris.

Other shopping centres on Rosenthaler Straße (1903), Königsstraße (1911) and, again, on Moritzplatz (1913) followed. The Moritzplatz Wertheim store helped to finance the redirecting of the U-Bahn (Underground) (copying the model of his competitor Rudolph Karstadt) in order that customers could go directly from the underground platform to the entrance.

In 1913 the Wertheim empire was the largest German company of its kind. The success soon also aroused envy, and because most shopping complexes like Wertheim were in the hands of Jewish family companies, there were many versatile campaigns against the shopping centres. It was insinuated that they worked with false weightings, provided inferior goods, exploited employees, and demoralised customers. The Wertheim family tried to counter and work against such criticisms with special quality and security provision for their employees.

== Nazi persecution of Jews ==
In 1933, the Jewish Wertheim family were forced to "Arianise" their company, i.e. to surrender their company to an "Aryan." On 1 January 1937, Georg Wertheim left the business, but the Wertheim family attempted to avoid losing control of the company by making Georg's wife, Ursula, the principal shareholder since she was considered "Aryan" under Nazi law. The company was declared as German and renamed as the “Allgemeine Warenhandels-Gesellschaft” (General Merchandise Trading Business), or AWAG.

Georg Wertheim died on 31 December 1939 in Berlin.

== Legacy ==
After the Second World War, Wertheim in 1949 was ousted from the DDR, and in 1951 in West Germany the Hertie-Konzern bought the majority of the shares and continued the business under the Wertheim name. The relatives of the family received some small compensation and relinquished all claims to the shares of the company purchased by Hertie. In 1984, Hertie acquired the rest of the Wertheim stock.

For a long time, the shop on the corner of Steglitzer Schlossstrasse and Treischkestrasse was of greatest importance. In the 1960s it was largely expanded, which led to the restructuring of a whole residential quarter (in the direction of Schildhornstrasse). In the following decades a large Karstadt-shopping centre and other shopping centres developed on the Schlossstrasse/Bornstrasse corner next to Kaufhaus Wertheim, where for a long time already had stood Kette Held’s, later Hertie’s shops.

In 1994 the only remaining Wertheim store on Kurfuerstendamm together with the Hertie business were taken into the possession of the Karstadt company.

The descendants of the Wertheim family today live in Germany and the USA. They filed claims for restitution for some of the property that had been stolen from them under the Nazis. A large claim was resolved in 2007. KarstadtQuelle agreed to pay $117.5 million (88 million euros) in Holocaust related compensation.

== See also ==
- Wertheim department store

This article has been translated from Georg Wertheim
