= Solomon Bublick Award =

Award given by the Hebrew University of Jerusalem

The Solomon Bublick Award (also known as the Solomon Bublick Public Service Award or Solomon Bublick Prize) is an award made by the Hebrew University of Jerusalem to a person who has made an important contribution to the advancement and development of the State of Israel. The first award was made in 1949.

== History ==
Solomon Bublick (died 1945) was an American who left $37,000 to establish an award granted every two years. It is one of the two prestigious awards presented by the University. The prize is given for a lifetime dedicated to the well-being of the Jewish people and the State of Israel, alternatively to an Israeli and to a personality from abroad.

In 1950, the award included $1500. In 1960, the award included a sterling silver plaque and $1000.

== Recipients ==
- 2026 Professor Eliezer Rabinovici alumnus and Professor Emeritus of Physics at The Hebrew University and former president of CERN Council (2021).
- 2018 Professor Menachem Magidor former president and Professor Emeritus of mathematics at The Hebrew University
- 2016 Professor Hanoch Gutfreund alumnus and former president and Professor Emeritus of theoretical physics of The Hebrew University
- 2015 Israeli President and Prime Minister Shimon Peres
- 2012 Amal Elsana Alh'jooj, in recognition of her long-standing activism on behalf of the Bedouin community in Israel
- 2013 Prof. Ruth Gavison
- 2011 Prof. Ilan Chet
- 2010 Avi Naor
- 2009 Professor Shlomo Avineri, a leading Israeli social scientist, in recognition of his contribution to political science and the politics of the State of Israel
- 2003 Uzia Galil
- 1999 Haim Zadok for his manifold contributions to the Israeli legal System and the rule of law
- 1998 Prof. Aryeh Dvoretzky
- 1995 Saul Patai, for editing The Chemistry of Functional Groups
- 1992 Prof. Meir Kister
- 1991 Dr. David S. Sala
- 1981 Marie Syrkin, for work on behalf of the Jewish people
- 1980 Isador Magid
- 1979 Rabbi Alexander Schindler, for commitment to the role of education in Jewish life
- 1976 Philip S. Bernstein
- 1974 Michael M. Sacher, British Zionist leader
- 1972 Prof. Robert Bachi, professor of statistics and demography
- 1967 Judge Edward S. Silver
- 1966 Saul Adler, awarded posthumously, although informed on the day of his death
- 1966 Robert Szold
- 1964 Prof Haim Ernst Wertheimer, Professor of Biochemistry, for outstanding scientific work in the field of human biochemistry
- 1960 William Rosenwald, national chairman of the United Jewish Appeal
- 1957 Senator Herbert H. Lehman
- 1956 Dr. Bernhard Zondek, Professor of Gynaecology and Obstretics
- 1956 Dr. Nahum Goldmann
- 1953 President Harry S. Truman
- 1950 Prof. Eliezer Sukenik, Israel archaeologist, for his work on ancient scrolls believed to be the original manuscript of the Book of Isaiah
- 1949 David Ben-Gurion
