= Ruth Gavison =

Israeli law professor (1945–2020)

- רות גביזון
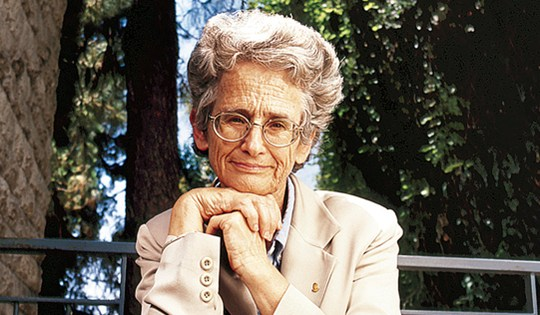
- Ruth Gavison
- Born: 28 March 1945; Jerusalem, Mandatory Palestine
- Died: 15 August 2020 (aged 75); Jerusalem, Israel
- Occupations: Legal scholar; Human rights activist; Professor of law
- Known for: Legal research, human rights advocacy
- Awards: EMET Prize (2003); Israel Prize (2011)

Ruth Gavison (Hebrew: רות גביזון; March 28, 1945 – August 15, 2020) was an Israeli expert on human rights, law professor at the Hebrew University of Jerusalem, and recipient of the Israel Prize.

== Biography ==
Ruth Gavison was born in Jerusalem on March 28, 1945, to a Sephardic Jewish family. Her father's ancestors were Moroccan Jews who immigrated from Tetouan to Jerusalem in the 19th century. Her mother's side was Greek Jewish. She grew up in Haifa. She graduated from Hebrew University law school in 1969. In 1970, she was also awarded a B.A. in philosophy and economics.

Further academic degrees and qualifications:

- LL.M., 1971, Hebrew University, Jerusalem.
- D.Phil. (Oxon.) (legal philosophy), 1975, University of Oxford.
- Clerk to Justice B. Halevi, Israel Supreme Court, 1970.
- Admitted to the Israeli Bar, 1971.

== Academic career ==
Her areas of research included ethnic conflict, the protection of minorities, human rights, political theory, judiciary law, religion and politics, and Israel as a Jewish and democratic state. She was a member of the Israel Academy of Sciences and Humanities.

== Judicial career ==
Gavison was nominated for a position on Israel's Supreme Court in 2005 but failed to secure a majority for the appointment. Justice Minister Daniel Friedmann asserted in 2007 that the Supreme Court justices opposed her nomination because they disagreed with her views. Gavison was critical of the court as an institution seeking to "judicialize politics" and freely expressed her views to the media.

== Published works ==
She published an essay on privacy in the Yale Law Journal and edited a volume dedicated to H.L.A. Hart's legal philosophy published by Oxford. Recently, she published an essay about days of rest in divided societies (co-authored with Nahshon Perez), included in Law and Religion in Comparative Context, published by Cambridge. She was a member of the editorial board of the Jewish Review of Books.

With Rabbi Yaaqov Medan, she coauthored the Gavison-Medan Covenant, a proposal for the coexistence of religious and secular Israelis.

== Civil rights activism ==
Gavison was a founding member of the Association for Civil Rights in Israel (ACRI), where she served for many years as Chairperson and as President from 1996 to 1999. Professor Gavison was a member of the International Commission of Jurists from 1998 to 2008. In 2005 she founded Metzilah (Center of Zionist, Jewish, Liberal, and Humanistic Thought) and served as its chair and founding president.

== Academic appointments ==
- 1969–2020: various appointments at the Faculty of Law of the Hebrew University, Jerusalem (HUJI).
- 1978–1980: Visiting Associate Professor of Law, Yale Law School.
- 1984–2010: Haim H. Cohn Chair for Human Rights, HUJI.
- 1990–2010: Full Professor, Faculty of Law, HUJI.
- 1990–1992: Visiting Professor of Law, University of Southern California.
- 1998–1999: Fellow, Center for Human Values, Princeton University.
- 2010–2020: Professor Emerita, HUJI.
- 2011–2012: Fellow, Strauss center for Law and Justice, NYU Law School.

== Public committees ==
Gavison was a member of numerous Israeli Public Inquiry committees, including the following:

- 1976: Member, Kahan Committee on Privacy (generated Israel's law of privacy 1981).
- 1983: Member, committee on the privacy of information in governmental data-banks (generated an amendment to the privacy law).
- 1987–1990: Member, a public committee on orthodox-secular relationships in Israel.
- 1994–1997: Member, National Committee for Scientific and Technological Infrastructure.
- 1996–1997: Member, Zadok committee on press laws.
- 1997–1998: Member, Shamgar Committee on the Appointment of the Attorney-General and Related Issues.
- 2006–2008: Member, Winograd Commission to investigate the 2006 Lebanon War.
- 2013–2015: commissioned by the minister of Justice to report on the constitutional anchoring of Israel as a Jewish and democratic state.

== Awards and recognition ==
- In 1997, Gavison was awarded the Zeltner Prize for legal research.
- In 1998, she received the Bar Association Prize, together with Association for Civil Rights in Israel.
- In 2001, she received the Avi Chai Prize, together with Rabbi Yaakov Medan, for bringing together Israeli society.
- In 2002, she was awarded the Jerusalem Prize for tolerance.
- In 2003, she was awarded the EMET Prize.
- In 2003, she was granted an honorary doctorate by the Jewish Theological Seminary, New York.
- In 2009, she was awarded the Cheshin Prize for excellence in research by the Hebrew University of Jerusalem.
- In 2009, she was granted an honorary doctorate by Bar-Ilan University.
- In 2011, she was awarded the Israel Prize, for legal research.
- In 2013, she received the Solomon Bublick Award of the Hebrew University of Jerusalem.
- In 2015, she was awarded an honorary degree by the Open University of Israel.

== See also ==
- List of Israel Prize recipients
