= Haim Ernst Wertheimer =

Israeli biochemist (1893–1978)

- חיים ארנסט ורטהיימר
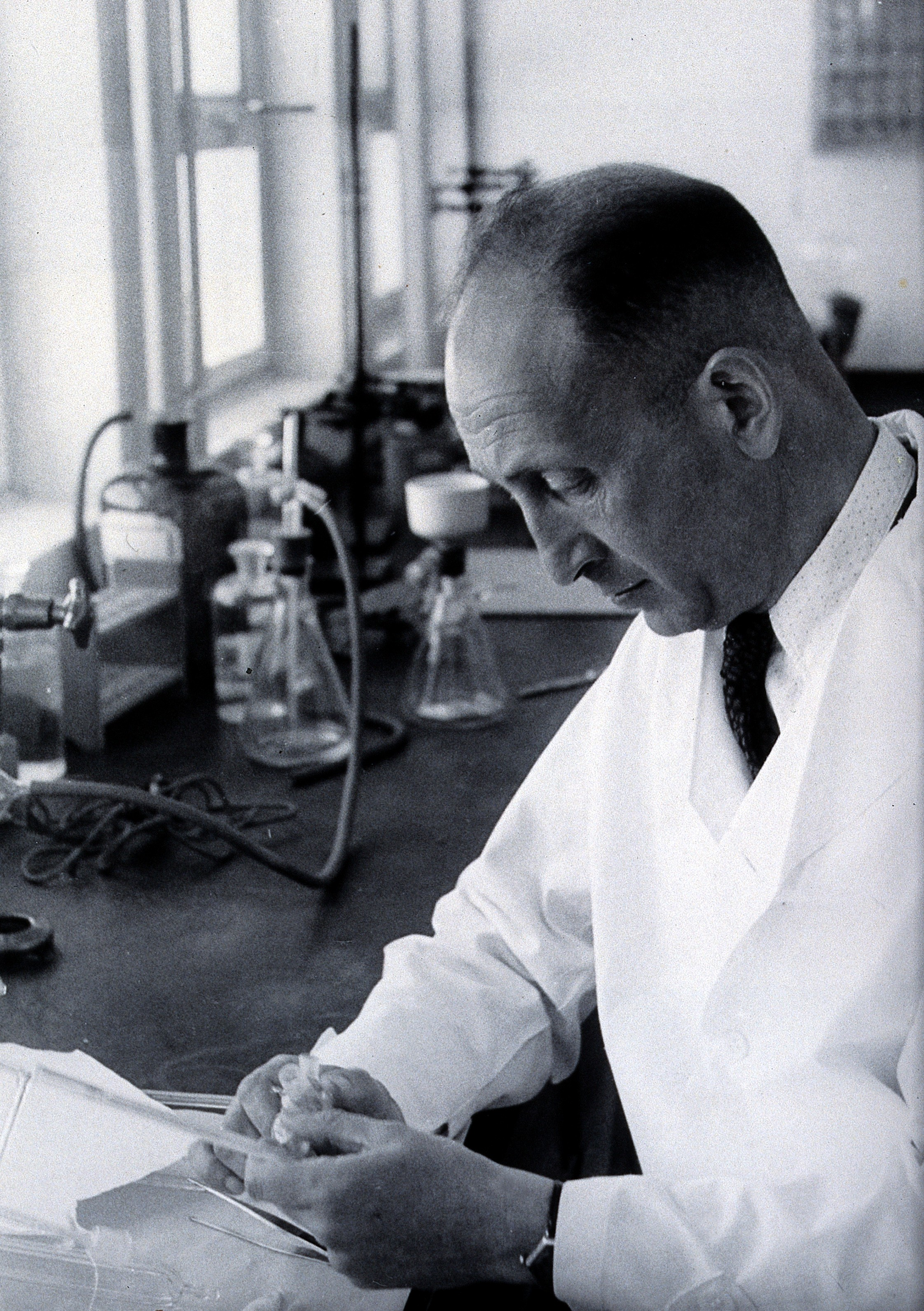
- Born: August 24, 1893; Bühl, Germany
- Died: March 23, 1978 (aged 84)
- Known for: Research of the field of fat metabolism
- Awards: Israel Prize (1956); Solomon Bublick Award (1964)

Haim Ernst Wertheimer (Hebrew: חיים ארנסט ורטהיימר; August 24, 1893 – March 23, 1978) was an Israeli biochemist.

== Biography ==
Wertheimer was born in Bühl, Germany in 1893 and studied in his native town and in Baden-Baden. He commenced studying medicine in 1912, initially in Berlin, Bonn and Kiel, before his studies were interrupted by World War I, where he served in a medical capacity in Flanders and Italy, and was awarded the Iron Cross, second class, and other decorations. Following the war, he completed his medical studies in Heidelberg University.

In 1920–21 Wertheimer worked as a doctor at Berlin's municipal orphanage, and subsequently received a position at the Institute for Physiology, University of Halle.

With the Nazi rise to power in Germany Wertheimer lost his job. In 1934 he emigrated to Mandate Palestine and accepted a job as temporary director of the Laboratory of Chemistry, at Hadassah Medical School in the Hebrew University of Jerusalem. He continued working at the Hadassah Medical Center until 1963, and served as dean of the institution in the '50s. Werthimer is regarded as the father of the field of fat metabolism.

== Awards ==
- In 1956, Wertheimer was awarded the Israel Prize, for medicine.
- In 1964, he received the Solomon Bublick Award of the Hebrew University of Jerusalem.
- In 1964 he received the Banting Medal for Scientific Achievement Award.

== See also ==
- List of Israel Prize recipients
- Wertheimer
