= Gavison-Medan Covenant =

2003 proposal for religion-state relations in Israel

The Gavison-Medan Covenant is a controversial proposal for the relation of religion and state in Israel, intended to retain the state's Jewish character, while minimizing religious coercion. It is named after Professor Ruth Gavison and Orthodox Rabbi Yaaqov Medan, the document's primary drafters. It was first published in 2003.

== Contents ==
=== Law of Return ===
The covenant would restrict grandchildren of Jews from eligibility for the Law of Return. Instead of immediately being granted citizenship, those making aliyah would have to wait three years and demonstrate basic proficiency in Hebrew.

=== Conversion ===
The law would allow those who are recognized as Jews by any denomination of the religion to register as such on the population registry, but the entry would also state the basis of their claim.

=== Marriage ===
Marriage in Israel would be overhauled so that civil marriage was allowed for heterosexual couples. However, those who chose a religious ceremony would have to obtain a religious divorce before remarrying.

=== Sabbath ===
The Covenant distinguishes between culture and entertainment, which would be allowed, and commercial or manufacturing activity, which would be prohibited.

== Proposed implementation ==
Parts of the covenant have been proposed as legislation, for example, the Sabbath bill sponsored in 2017 by the Yesh Atid and Kulanu parties. The New Right party, established in 2018, proposes to use the covenant as a blueprint for reforming state Judaism.
