= Wertheim (surname) =

Wertheim is a German surname. Notable people with the surname include:

- Abraham Carel Wertheim (1832–1897), Dutch banker and philanthropist
- Blanka Wertheim (1917–2012), birth name of Blanka Wladislaw, Brazilian chemist
- Dick Wertheim (died 1983), American tennis linesman
- Eric Wertheim (born 1973), American naval expert, columnist and author
- Ernst Wertheim (1864–1920), Austrian gynecologist
- Georg Wertheim (1857–1939), German merchant
- Géza Wertheim (1910–1979), Luxembourgian tennis player and bobsledder
- Herbert Wertheim, American inventor, scientist, educator and clinician
- John Wertheim (born 1968), American lawyer and politician
- Juliusz Wertheim (1880–1928), Polish pianist, conductor and composer
- Jon Wertheim (born 1970), American sports journalist and author
- Lucy Wertheim (1883–1971), English art dealer
- Margaret Wertheim (born 1958), Australian science writer and commentator
- Maurice Wertheim (1886–1950), American banker, chess player, and philanthropist
- Micha Wertheim (born 1972), Dutch comedian and satirist
- Nicholas Wertheim (1909–2015), birth name of Nicholas Winton, British humanitarian who organised the rescue of 669 children from Czechoslovakia on the eve of World War II in an operation known as the Kindertransport
- Pierre Wertheim (1888–1971), French World War I flying ace
- Robert Wertheim (1922–2020), American rear admiral
- Rosy Wertheim (1888–1949), Dutch pianist, music educator and composer
- Rupert Wertheim (1893–1933), Australian tennis player
- Theodor Wertheim (1820–1864), Austrian chemist
- Ursula Wertheim (1919–2006), German literary scholar and university teacher

== See also ==
- Wertheimer (surname, disambiguation page)
