= Ilan Chet =

Israeli microbiologist (born 1939)

- אילן חת
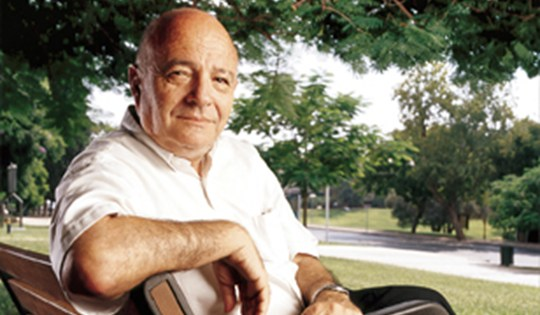
- Ilan Chet (2003)
- Born: April 12, 1939 (age 87); Haifa, Israel
- Education: Hebrew University of Jerusalem, Faculty of Agriculture (BSc (1962), MSc (1964), and PhD in Microbiology)
- Occupations: microbiologist and professor
- Known for: President of the Weizmann Institute of Science
- Awards: the Rothschild Prize in Agriculture; the Israel Prize in Agriculture; the Wolf Prize in Agriculture; the Solomon Bublick Award of the Hebrew University of Jerusalem

Ilan Chet (Hebrew: אילן חת; born April 12, 1939) is an Israeli microbiologist and a professor at the Hebrew University of Jerusalem, Faculty of Agriculture in Rehovot. He was appointed Deputy Secretary General of the Union of the Mediterranean in 2010 with responsibility for its Higher Education and Research Division In 2000 he was nominated for the position of President of the Weizmann Institute of Science.

== Early life ==
Chet was born in Haifa, Israel. He completed his BSc (1962), MSc (1964) and PhD from the Hebrew University of Jerusalem, Faculty of Agriculture. He completed his PhD in Microbiology.

== Research ==
Chet is recognized as a pioneer in the field of biological control of plant pathogens which cause major crop losses. His research concerns with the biological control of plant disease using environment-friendly microorganisms, focusing on the basic, applied, and biotechnological aspects of this field. Chet has published over 300 articles in international scientific journals, edited three books in his field, and holds 30 patents.

== Awards and honors ==
Chet has received several awards and honors for his work.

- In 1990, he was awarded the Rothschild Prize in Agriculture.
- In 1991, he was awarded an honorary doctorate from Sweden's Lund University
- In 1994, he received the Max-Planck Award for Distinguished Research.
- In 1996, he received the Japanese Arima Prize for Applied Microbiology.
- In 1996, he was awarded the Israel Prize in agriculture.
- In 1998, he received the Wolf Prize in Agriculture.
- In 2011, received the Solomon Bublick Award of the Hebrew University of Jerusalem.

He has been a member of the Israel Academy of Sciences and Humanities since 1998, and in 2000 was nominated for the position of President of the Weizmann Institute of Science.

== See also ==
- List of Israel Prize recipients
