= Wertheim (department store) =

German department store chain

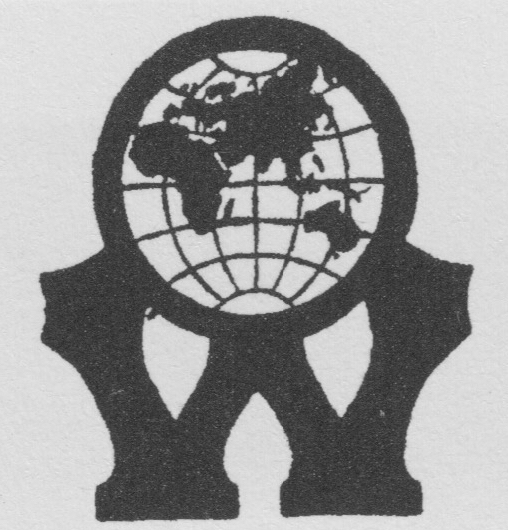
- Industry: retail
- Founder: Georg Wertheim
- Headquarters: Germany

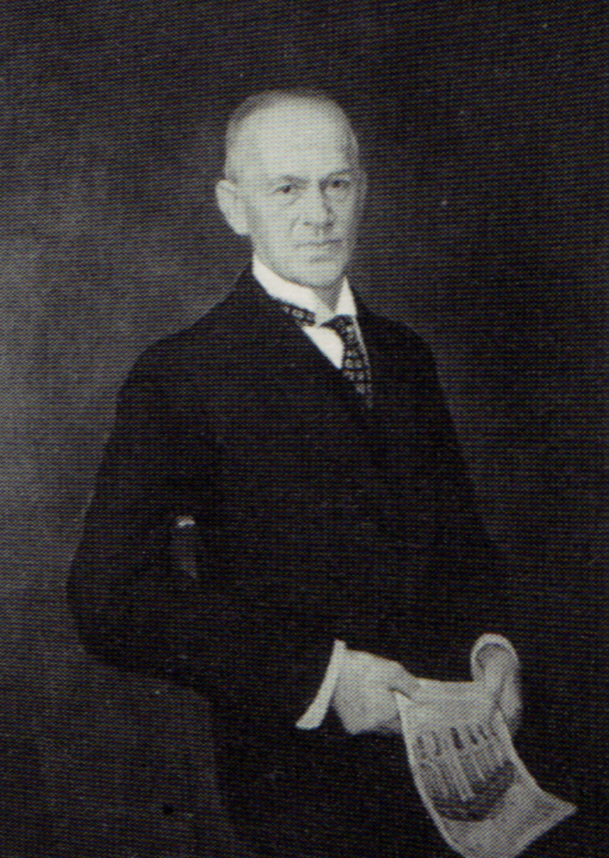
Georg Wertheim

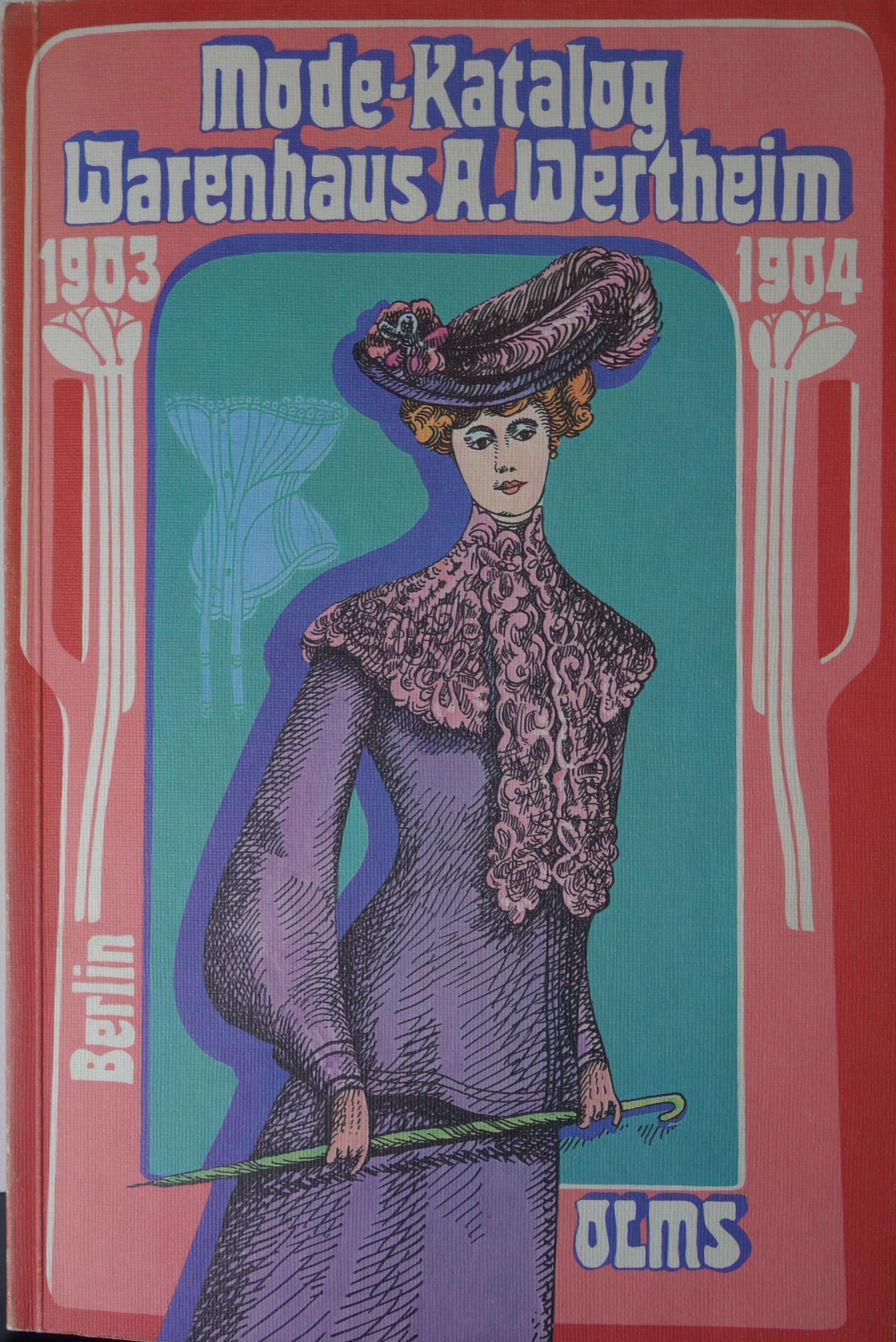
Catalogue, 1903-4

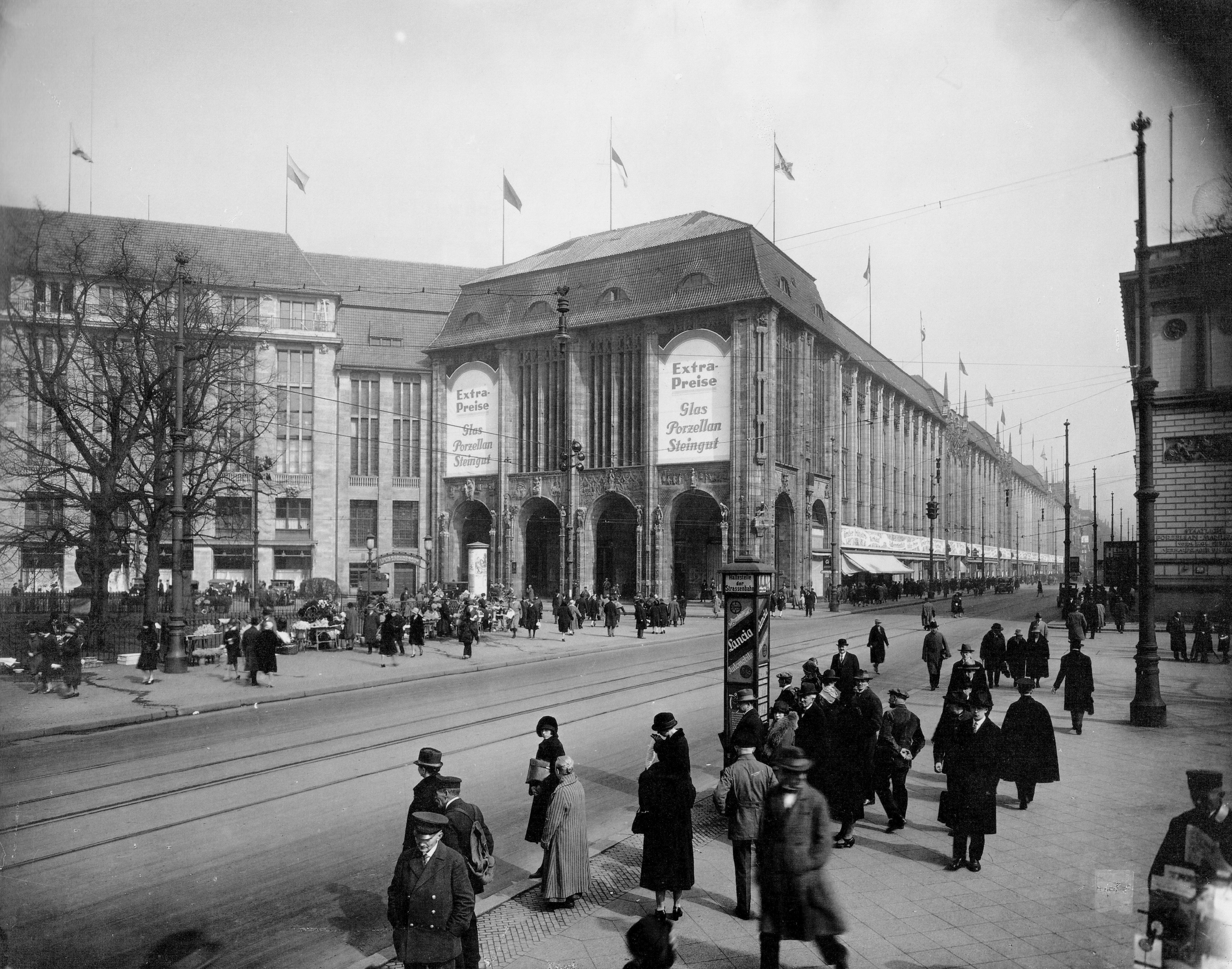
The Wertheim store on Leipziger Platz in Berlin, seen after 1926.

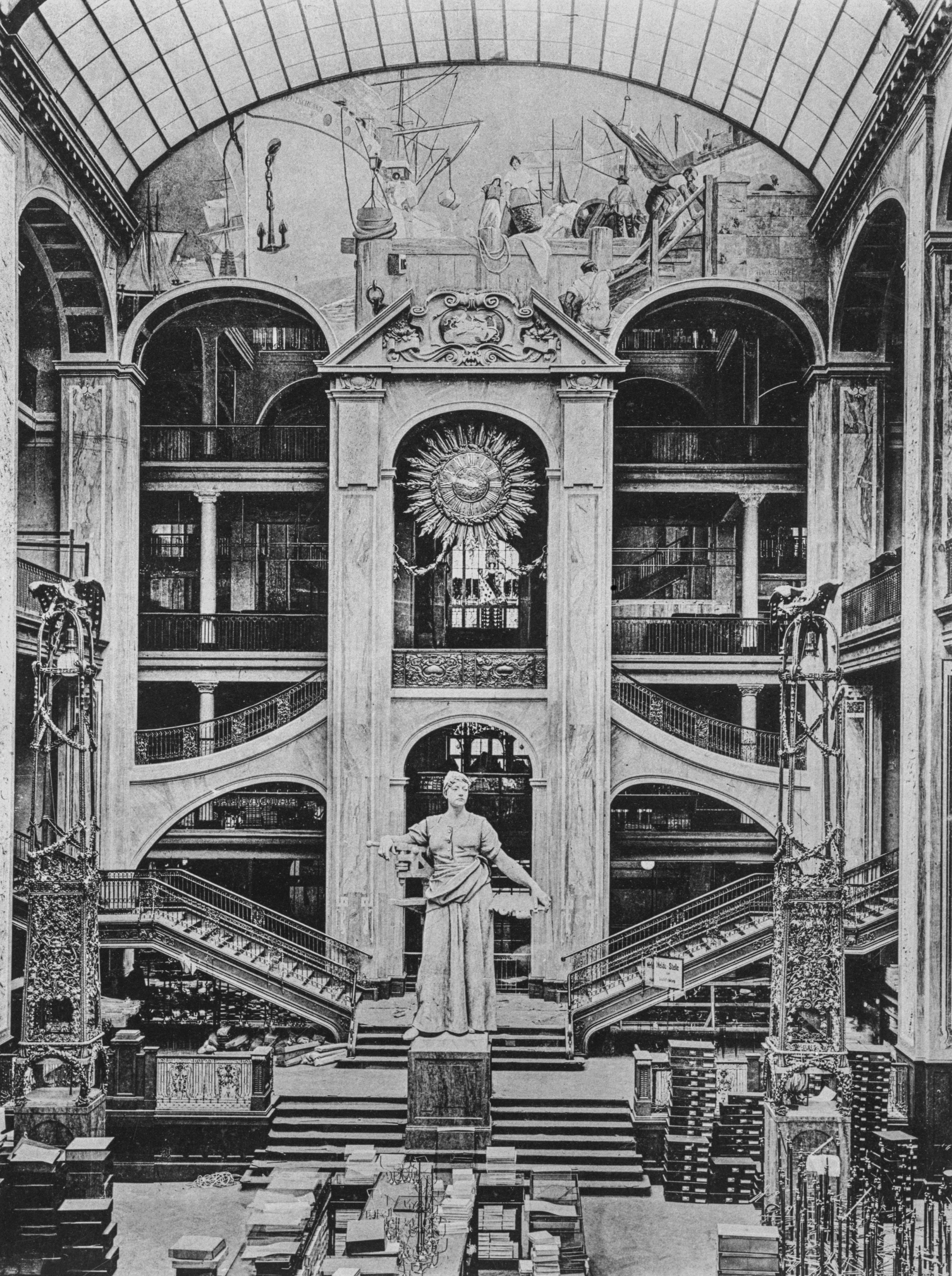
The larger atrium of the Wertheim store on Leipziger Platz, c. 1900.

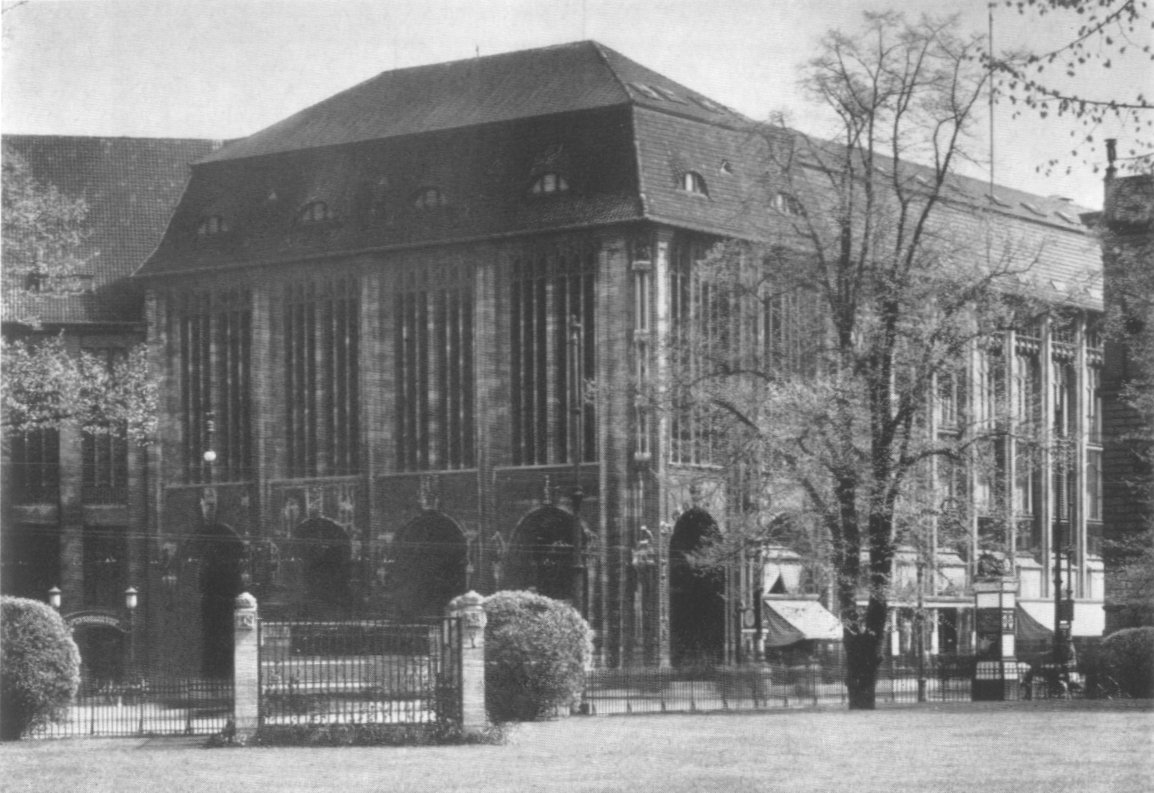
The main entrance to the Leipziger Platz

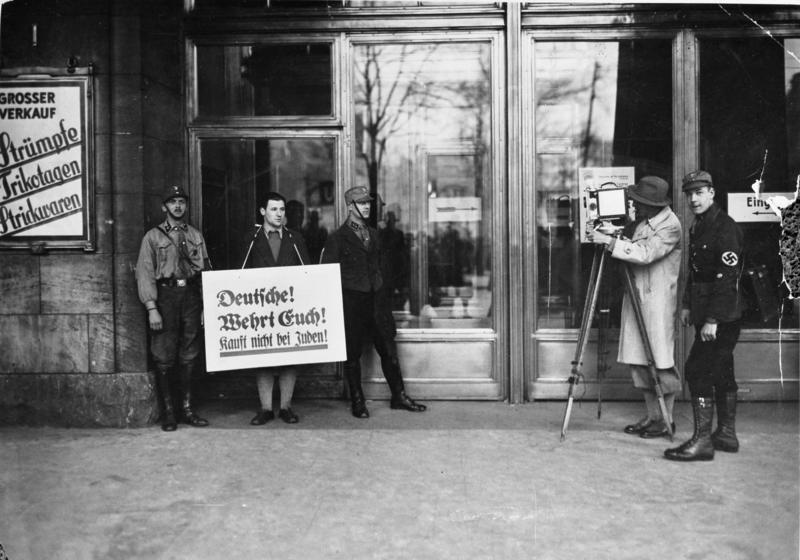
Nazis picketing the main store

Wertheim was a large department store chain in pre-World War II Germany. It was founded by Georg Wertheim and operated various stores in Berlin, one in Rostock, one in Stralsund (where it had been founded), and one in Breslau. Its Jewish owners were forced out after 1933 by the new Nazi government. After the war, owner Karstadt operated various store branches across Germany under the Wertheim name, all of which either closed or were rebranded Karstadt.

== Founding and early years ==
In 1875, Georg's parents, Ida and Abraham Wertheim (who sometimes went by the name Adolf), had opened a modest shop selling clothes and manufactured goods in Stralsund, a provincial town on the Baltic Sea. An extensive network of family members ensured a low-priced supply of goods. In 1876, one year after the shop opened, the two eldest sons Hugo and Georg (aged 20 and 19 respectively), went to work in the shop following their apprenticeships in Berlin. Three younger sons later joined them.

== Expansion and growth ==
The two brothers quickly brought new ideas into the shop: customers were allowed to replace goods, the price of a good was no longer debatable but reliable, and purchases were made strictly with cash. This concept was successful, and after the opening of another branch in Rostock, the first branch in Berlin (Rosenthaler Straße) was founded in 1885.

Wertheim quickly realised the changing demand of the growing city in the period of industrialisation and in 1890 opened the first real department store on Moritzplatz/Oranienstraße in Berlin-Kreuzberg. The shop floor was more generous in size and permitted more elaborate presentation of products for sale, products were put on display, and longer runs allowed lower prices.

However, it increasingly appeared that the limitations, which arose due to the shops' locations within an older-style structures with rooms that were not especially large and this made further expansion difficult.

A store was established on Leipziger Strasse in 1892, and in 1894 began the sale of goods in the first purpose planned and built department store on the Oranienstraße.

The flagship Wertheim store on the Leipziger Platz opened in 1896 and attracted an upmarket clientele, who until then had held back from patronising his department stores, with all their needs satisfied under one roof. In the following years, Messel had to constantly expand the building.

Other stores on Rosenthaler Straße (1903), Königsstraße (1911) and, again, on Moritzplatz (1913) were rebuilt or expanded. The Moritzplatz Wertheim store helped to finance the redirecting of the U-Bahn (Underground) (copying the model of his competitor Rudolph Karstadt) in order that customers could go directly from the underground platform to the entrance.

== Leipziger Platz store ==
The chain's most famous store, on Leipziger Platz in Berlin, was the biggest department store in Europe at the time, and was one of the three largest department stores (Warenhäuser) in Berlin, the others being Hermann Tietz and Kaufhaus des Westens. This store was constructed between 1896 and 1906 by the renowned architect Alfred Messel who also designed other stores for the firm, such as that at Rosenthaler Straße 27–31/Sophienstraße 12–15 (partially surviving) which was built between 1903 and 1906.

At its full extent the building covered 26,000 square metres and faced both the Leipziger Strasse and the Voßstraße and stretched nearly all the way from the Leipziger Platz to the Wilhelmstraße.

During construction the night-time electric lighting and steel scaffolding caused a sensation, and when the store opened on 15 November 15, 1897, the result was traffic chaos on the Leipziger Straße.

The innovative, vertically structured façade of narrow pillars extending from the ground floor to the roof and interspersed with windows received high praise, not least because it alluded to the building's function.

After passing through a vestibule two-storeys high, one entered a rectangular light well 22 meters high and 450 square meters in size. On the opposite wall an imposing stairway led to the upper sales floors. On the landing was a 6-meter-high (20-foot) statue symbolizing “Labor” by Ludwig Manzel, and the wall above was decorated with monumental frescoes showing an ancient harbor by Max Koch and a modern harbor by Fritz Gehrke.

It featured 83 elevators and two glass-roofed atriums.

With the construction of the corner pavilion on the Leipziger Platz frontage, with its deep portico, in 1904, Messel created nothing less than the incunabulum of progressive department store architecture. The traditional formal language, with the quasi-ecclesiastical sculpture employed, was described by critics as a "positive catastrophe", contrasting with the much-derided Berliner Dom (Cathedral), which was completed around the same time. The portico's sculptures, featuring figures from the Old Testament and Greek Mythology were the work of Josef Rauch (1868–1921). Fritz Stahl made the comment that the Leipzigerplatz portico was the "first building of the time to restore sculpture to its true architectonic relationship".

The tremendous impact of the new department store on the general public as well as on architecture experts is documented in newspaper and magazine articles and statements by famous architects and their critics. These included Peter Behrens, Henry van de Velde, August Endell, Bruno Taut, Ludwig Mies van der Rohe, Hermann Muthesius, Karl Scheffler, Walter Curt Behrendt, Fritz Stahl, Alfred Lichtwark, Heinrich Schliepmann amongst others. Brian Ladd called it “the crown jewel of the main shopping street."

The store did not survive World War II. In March 1943 it was damaged by three exploding bombs, and its final destruction was caused by a fire started by a phosphorus bomb. The ruins were cleared away in 1955–56 to make way for a border strip demarcating the Russian sector of Berlin.

== The Nazi period: persecution and Aryanization ==
When the Nazis came to power in Germany in 1933, the Wertheim department store chain was targeted by the state. Like Tietz, it was owned by a Jewish family. The company was Aryanized—that is, forcibly transferred to non-Jewish owners. Jewish employees were forced from their positions by government mandate. The Wertheim family attempted to avoid losing control of the company by making Georg's wife, Ursula, the principal shareholder, since she was considered "Aryan" under Nazi law. In the end this was unsuccessful, even though they divorced to keep the shares in purely "Aryan" hands. The family was forced to sell all their shares at reduced prices to "Aryans" and in 1939 the store was renamed AWAG, an acronym for Allgemeine Warenhandelsgesellschaft A.G. (General Retailing Corporation). The Wertheim family fled Nazi Germany.

== Wertheim stores ==
=== Berlin-Mitte (city center) ===
- Leipziger Straße flagship (1897–1944)
- Königstraße^{[de]} (just west of Alexanderplatz, 1911–1945)
- Oranienburger Straße^{[de]} (1909–1914, today Kunsthaus Tacheles)
- Potsdamer Platz (in Columbushaus^{[de]} building, 1945–1948)
- Rosenthaler Straße^{[de]} (1885 first fashion store, new build 1903–1905),

=== Berlin outer boroughs ===
- Charlottenburg borough: Kurfürstendamm (1971–2008), converted to Karstadt
- Kreuzberg borough: * Oranienstraße^{[de]}:
  - Moritzplatz^{[de]} (southeast corner, 1913–1945)
  - Oranienstraße 53/54 (1894–1913)
- Steglitz borough: Schloßstraße^{[de]} (1952–2009), now site of Boulevard Berlin^{[de]} shopping center

=== Elsewhere in Germany ===
- Bochum (1958–1986, 1988/1989)
- Breslau (now Wrocław, Poland), Schweidnitzer Straße (now ulica Świdnicka 1930–1944, now Renoma
- Essen, Kettwiger Straße (1964–1986)
- Essen-Steele (1972–1979)
- Hannover, Kröpcke-Center (closed in 1981)
- Hannover, Raschplatz (closed in June 1979)
- Kaiserslautern, Stiftsplatz (closed)
- Rostock (opened 1881, new build 1903, closed 1945, from 1991 Hertie, 1995 closed, demolished 2000)
- Stralsund (1875; general goods, rebuilt 1903/1904, Expanded 1927/1928, 1948 converted to HO-Warenhaus Konsument, 1991 Horten-Konsument, 1996 closed)

== Gallery of branch stores ==
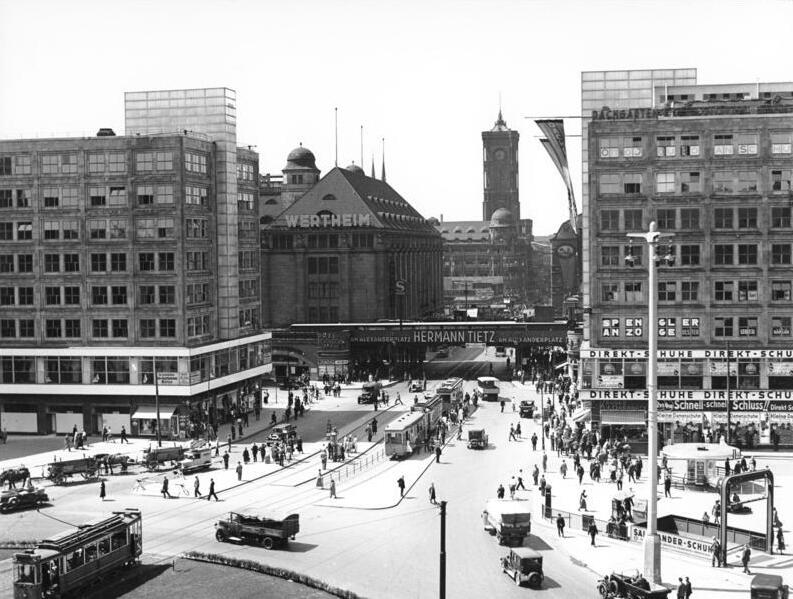
Berlin-Mitte Königsstraße (now Rathausstraße) as seen from Alexanderplatz

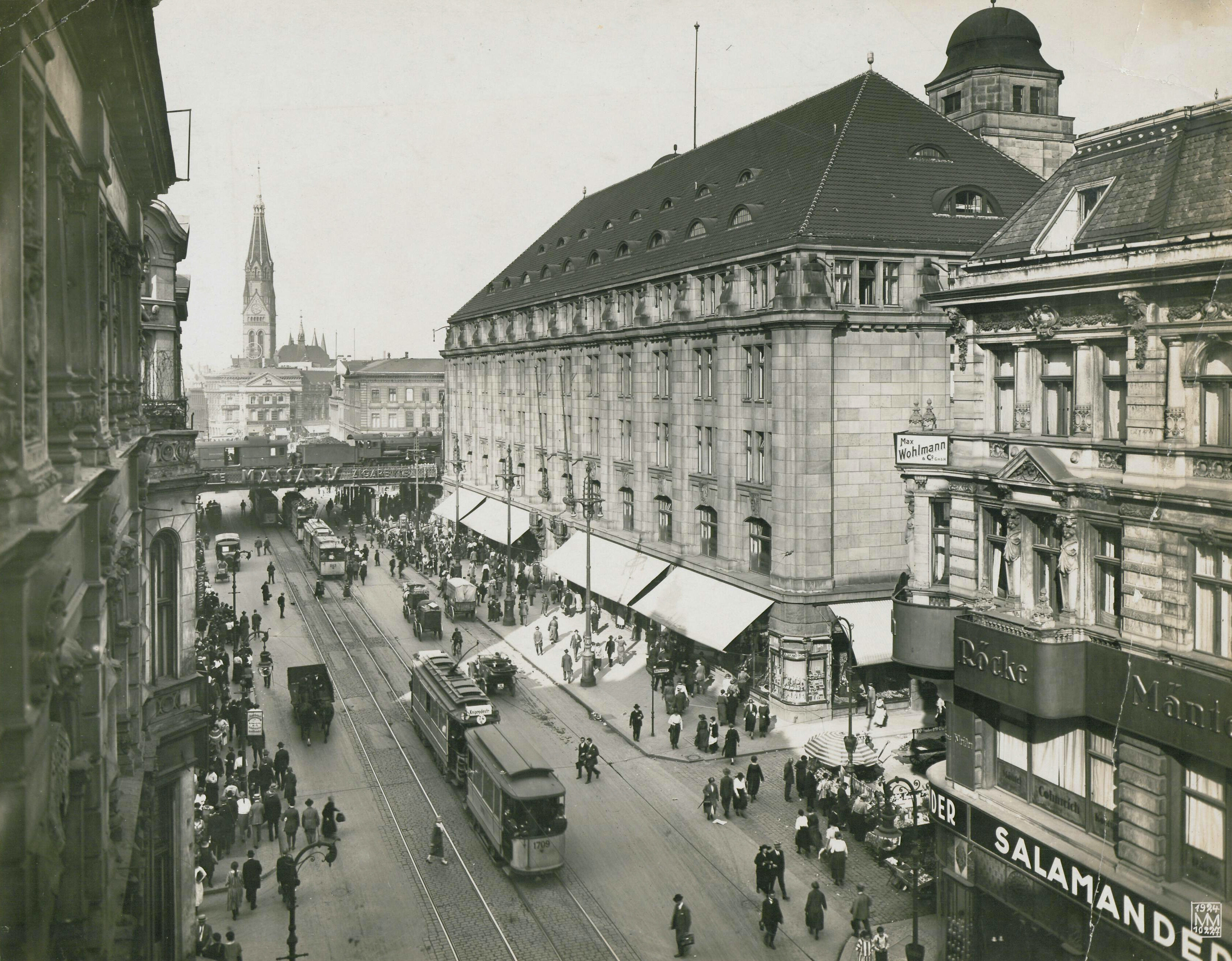
Berlin-Mitte Königsstraße (now Rathausstraße)

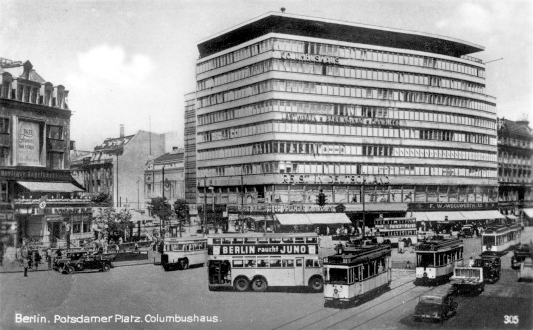
Berlin-Mitte Potsdamer Platz, Columbushaus in 1940; held a Wertheim 1945–48

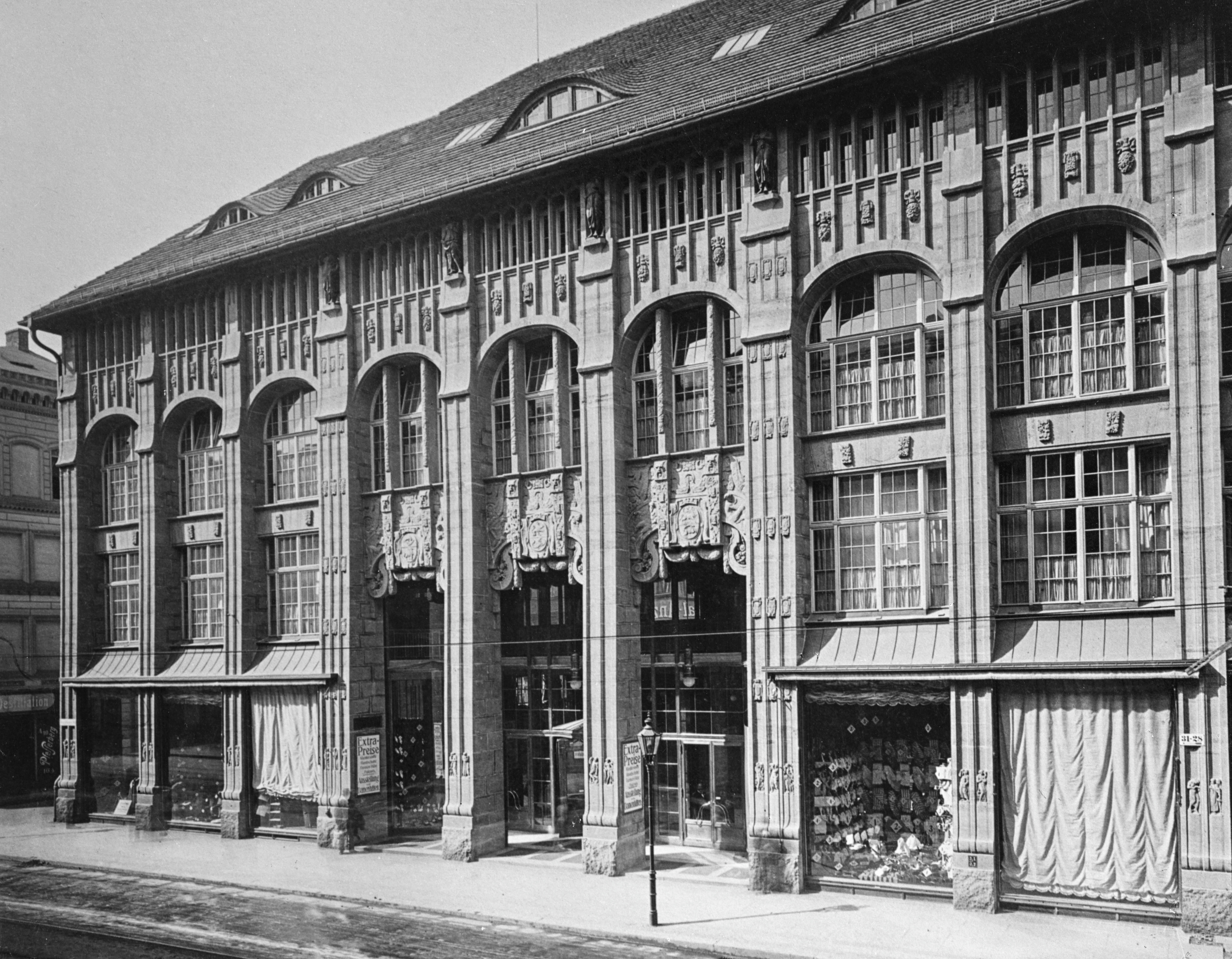
Berlin-Mitte Rosenthaler Straße 28-31 c.1905

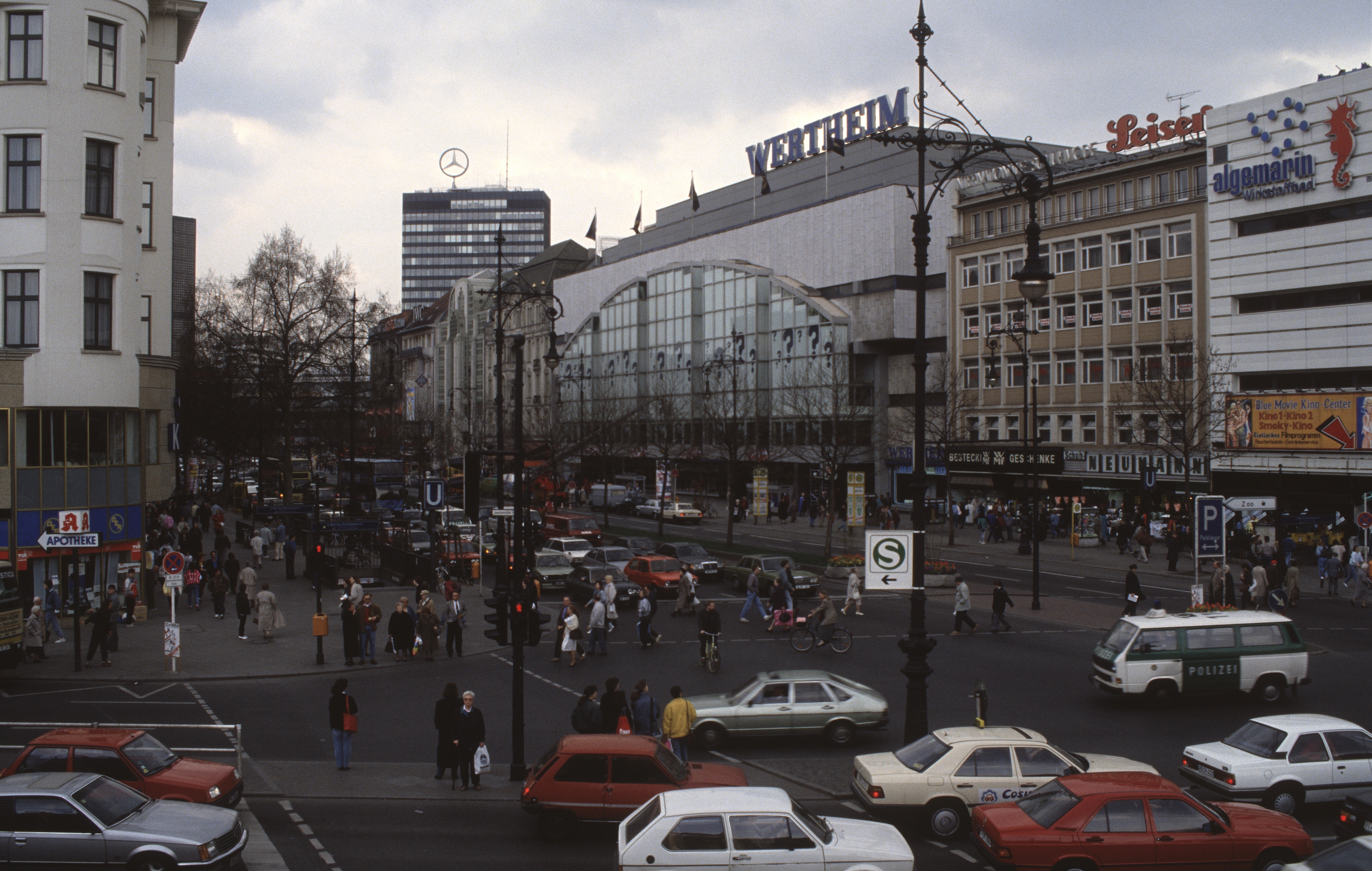
Berlin-Charlottenburg, Kurfürstendamm, 1989

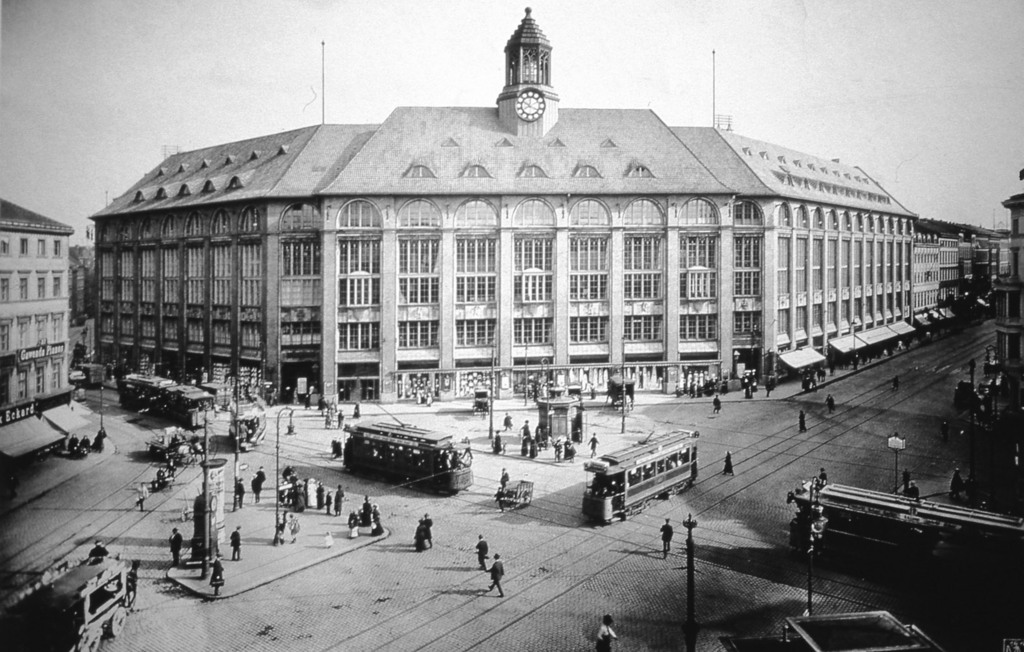
Berlin-Kreuzberg Moritzplatz, 1914

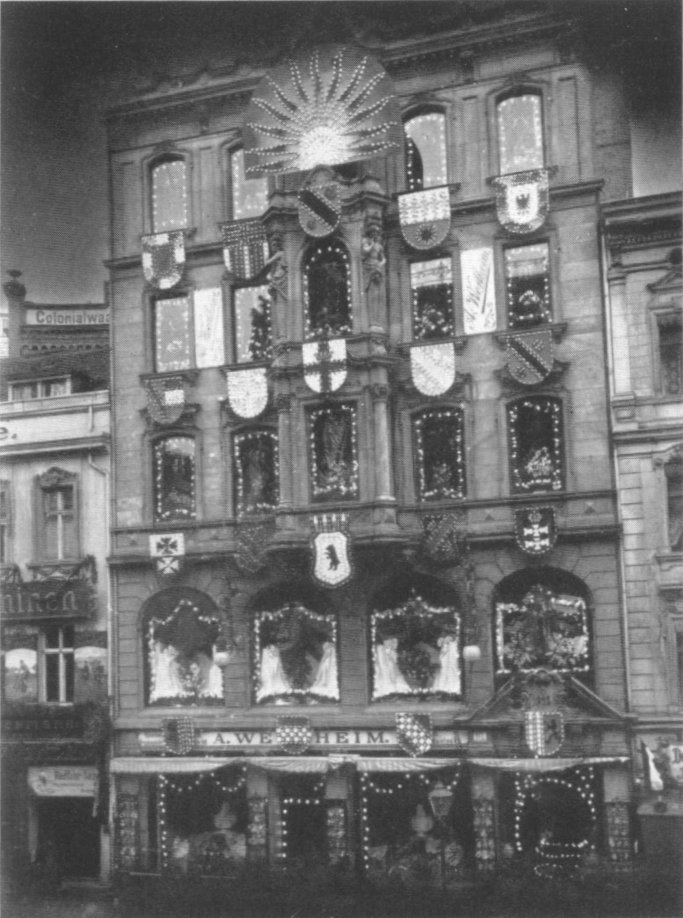
Berlin-Kreuzberg, Abraham Wertheim store, Oranienstraße 53/54 c.1900

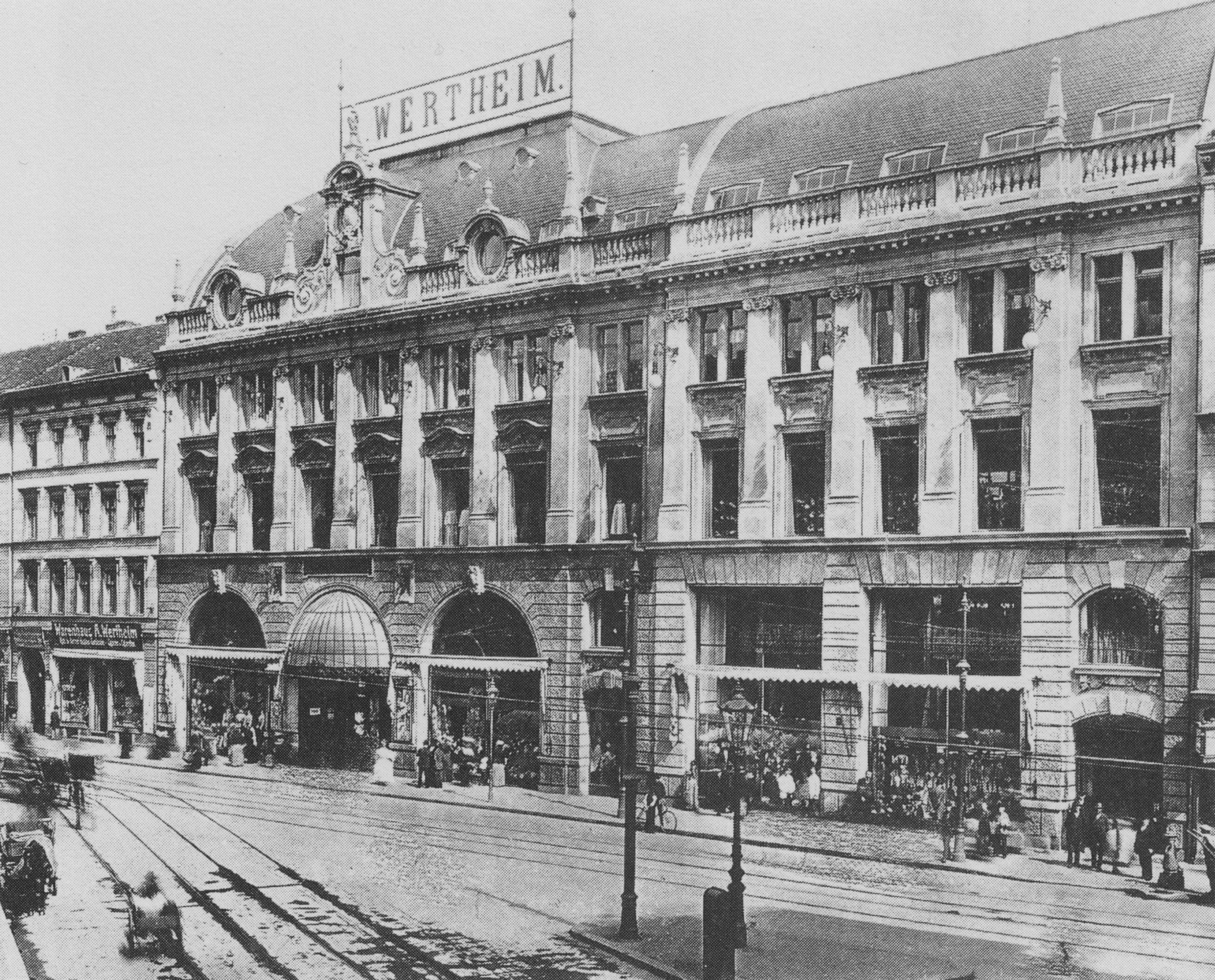
Berlin-Kreuzberg, Oranienstraße 52-54 c.1910

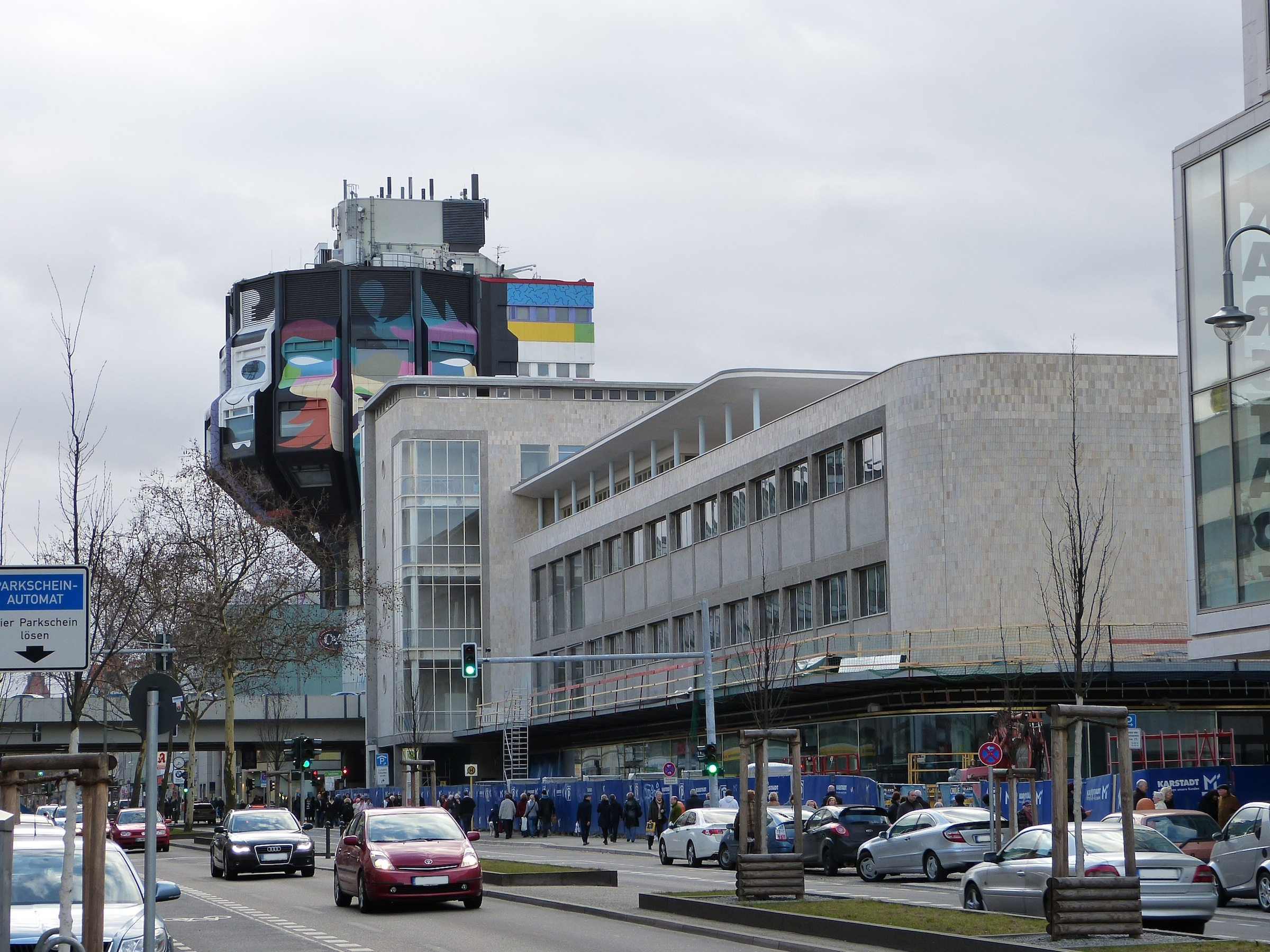
Berlin-Steglitz, Schloßstraße (2012)

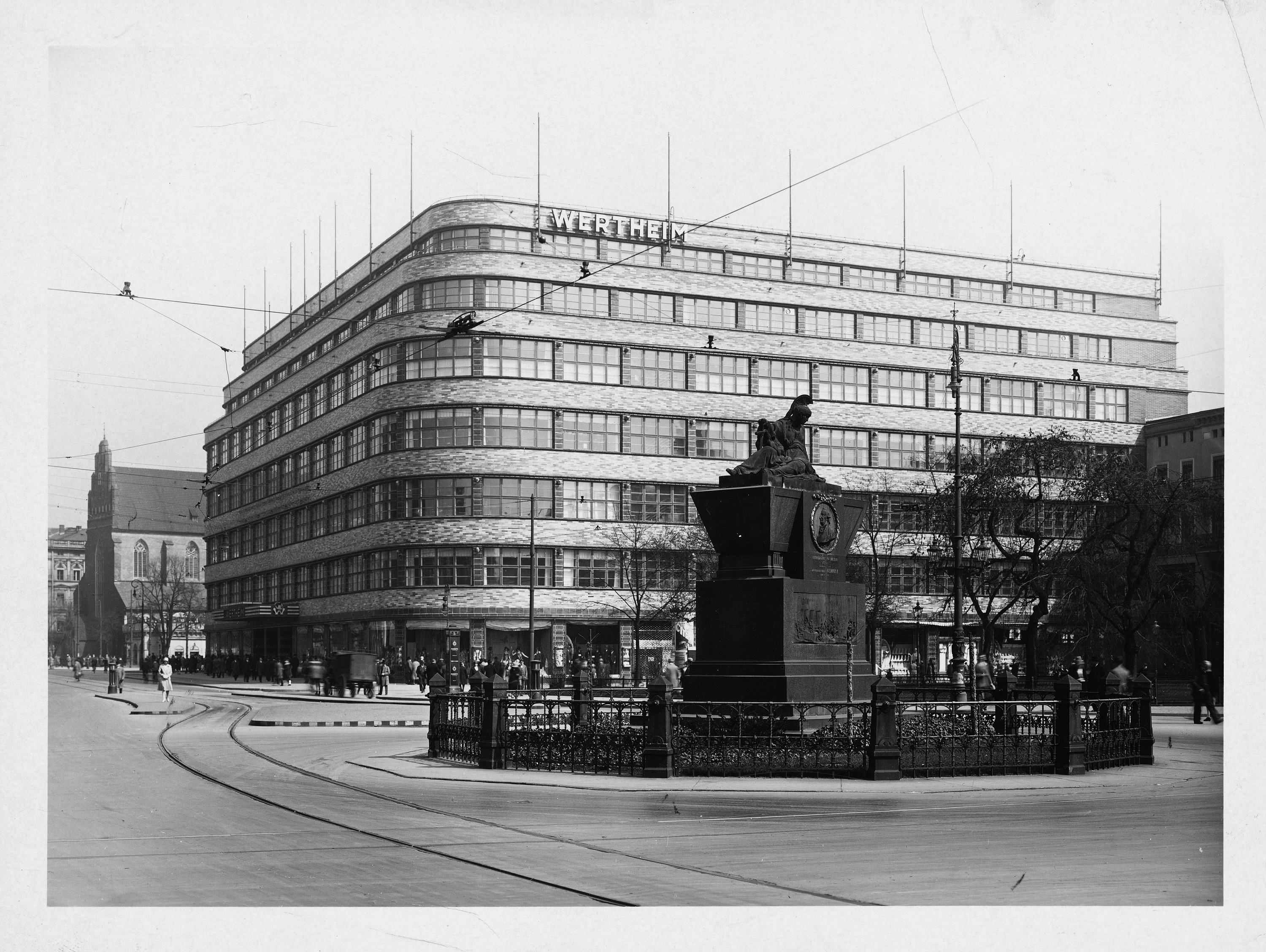
Wertheim Breslau (now Wrocław, Poland)

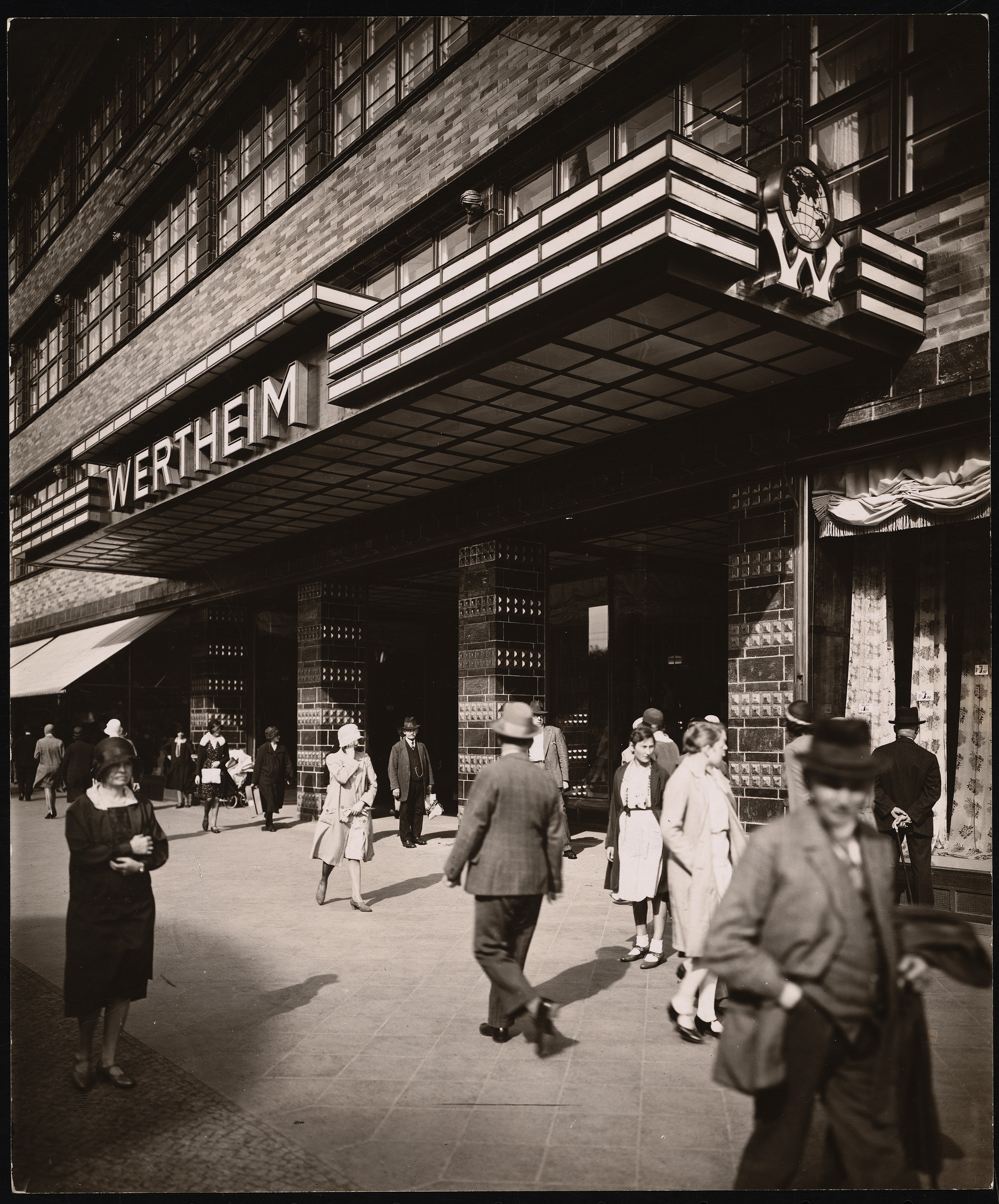
Wertheim Breslau, 1929 (now Wrocław, Poland)

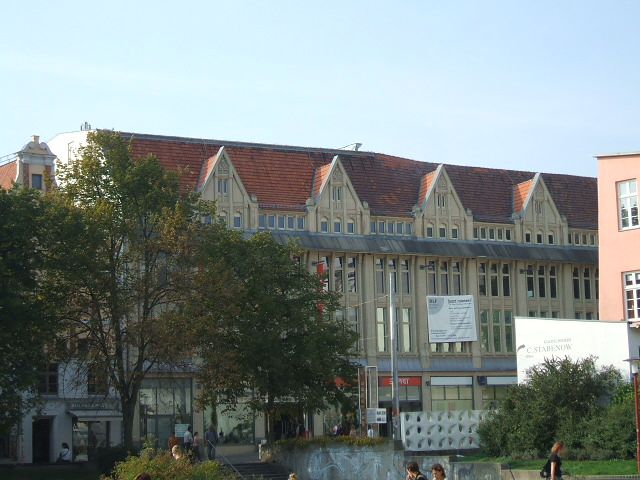
Wertheim Stralsund, exterior

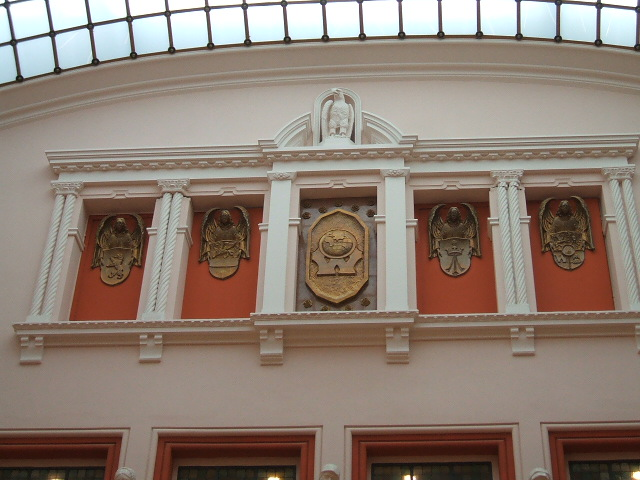
Wertheim Stralsund, interior

== Post-war ==
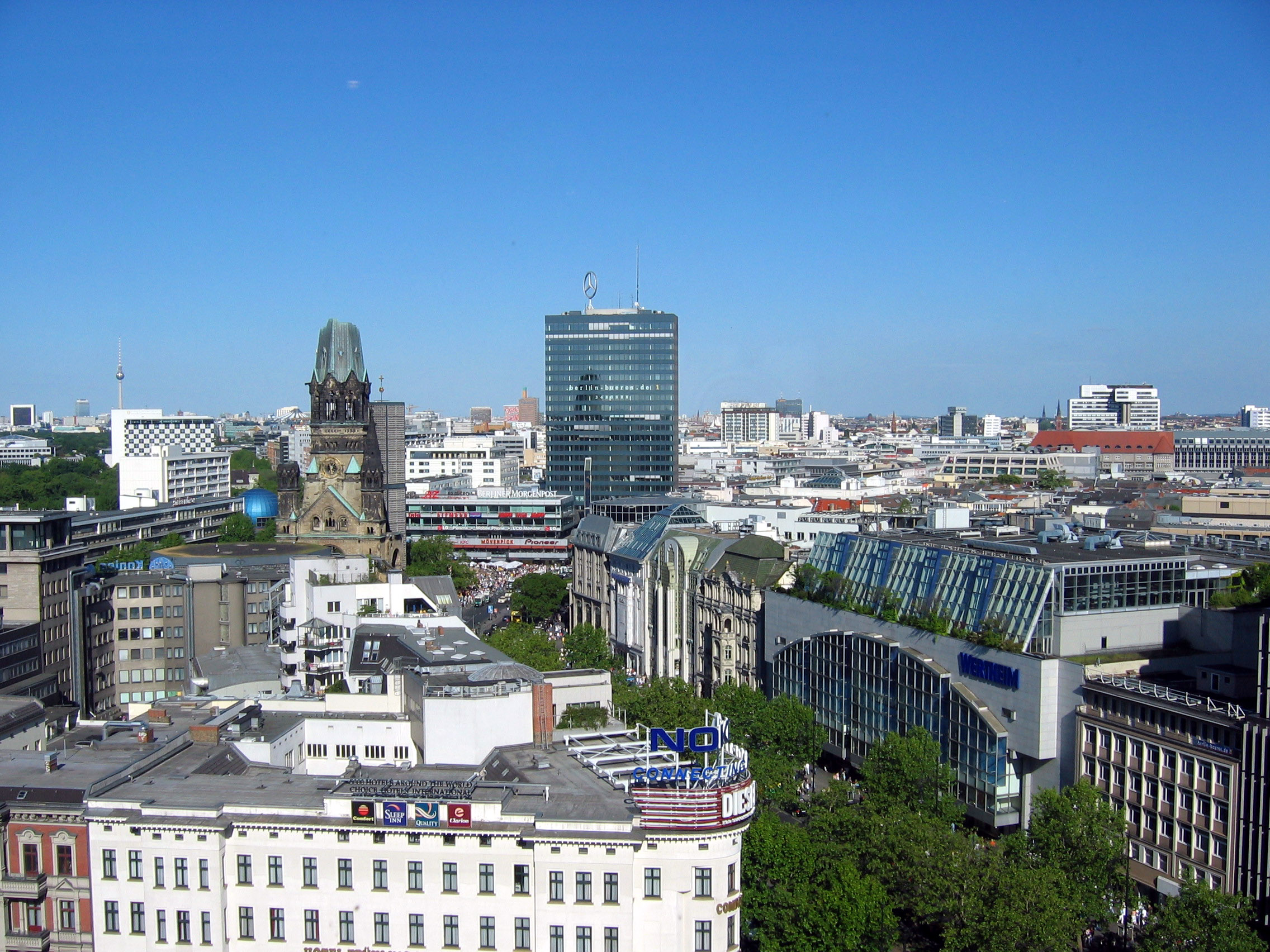
Kurfurstendamm in 2003, Wertheim is the large silver and blue building at lower right.

The new owner Karstadt operated under the Wertheim name. The flagship store was on the Kurfürstendamm. It was built in 1969–71 and was converted to a Karstadt in 2008. The other store was on the Schloßstraße in the Steglitz district. It was demolished in 2009 for construction of a new shopping center. The Wertheim family filed claims to try to recover the property taken under the Nazis.

Complicated negotiations mediated by former German Chancellor Helmut Kohl between Karstadt, the German government, the Claims Conference and members of the Wertheim family reached a settlement in 2006.

== See also ==
The Holocaust

Arcandor

Nuremberg Laws
