= Mildred S. Wertheimer =

American political scientist

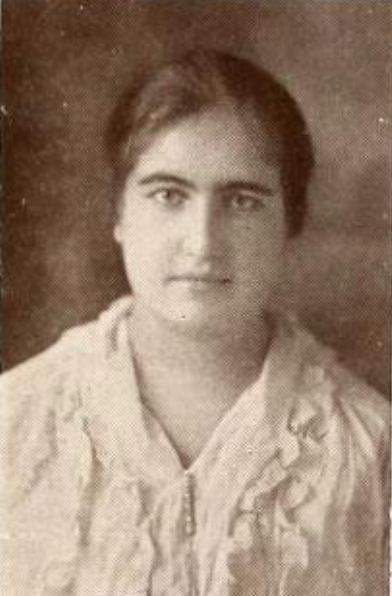
- Mildred S. Wertheimer, from the 1917 yearbook of Vassar College
- Born: April 19, 1896; San Diego, California, U.S.
- Died: May 6, 1937 (aged 41); San Diego, California, U.S.
- Occupation: Political scientist

Mildred Salz Wertheimer (April 19, 1896 – May 6, 1937) was an American political scientist, whose research focused on the rise of fascism in Europe, especially in Germany. She was a research associate at the Foreign Policy Association.

== Early life and education ==
Wertheimer was born in San Diego, California and raised in Kaukauna, Wisconsin, the daughter of Monroe A. Wertheimer and Annetta Salz Wertheimer. Her family was Jewish. Her father was president of a paper mill. She graduated from Vassar College in 1917. She earned a PhD in political science at Columbia University in 1924, with a dissertation on Pan-German propaganda before World War I. She also studied at the University of Berlin. She was an honorary member of Phi Beta Kappa.

== Career ==
Wertheimer worked in the International Law Division of the postwar Commission of Inquiry in 1918 and 1919. She became a research associate at the Foreign Policy Association in 1924. She worked with James G. McDonald on the High Commission for German Refugees. She spoke to academic and general audiences about the rise of Nazism in Germany.

Wertheimer toured in the Baltic. in 1929. She attended the First Hague Reparation Conference in 1929, and the London Conference of the Locarno Powers in 1936. She traveled to Alaska in 1936.

== Publications ==
Many of Wertheimer's reports on the rise of Nazism in Germany were published as stand-alone booklets by the Foreign Policy Association.

- The Pan-German League, 1890-1914 (1924)
- The Reconstruction of Poland (1930)
- The League of Nations and Prevention of War (1930)
- The Significance of the German Elections (1930)
- The Hitler Movement in Germany (1931)
- The Financial Crisis in Germany (1932)
- Lausanne Reparation Settlement (1932)
- The Political Outlook in Germany and France (1932)
- Forces Underlying the Nazi Revolution (1933)
- Hitler and the German Political Crisis, 1932-1933 (1933)
- The Jews in the Third Reich (1933)
- "Economic Structure of the Third Reich" (1934)
- "Toward a New Balance of Power in Europe" (1934)
- New Governments in Europe (1934, with Vera Micheles Dean, Baily W. Diffie, ad Malbone W. Graham)
- Germany Under Hitler (1935)
- "Aims of Hitler's Foreign Policy" (1935)
- "Austria Establishes a Fascist State" (1935)
- "Religion in the Third Reich" (1936)
- "The Nazification of Danzig" (1936)

== Personal life and legacy ==
Wertheimer died in 1937, at the age of 41, at the El Cortez Hotel in San Diego. Vera Micheles Dean dedicated an article to Wertheimer in a 1941 issue of Foreign Policy Reports. Her family's home in Kaukauna became a convent and rest home for Franciscan sisters in 1940.
