= Leipziger Platz =

Square in Berlin, Germany

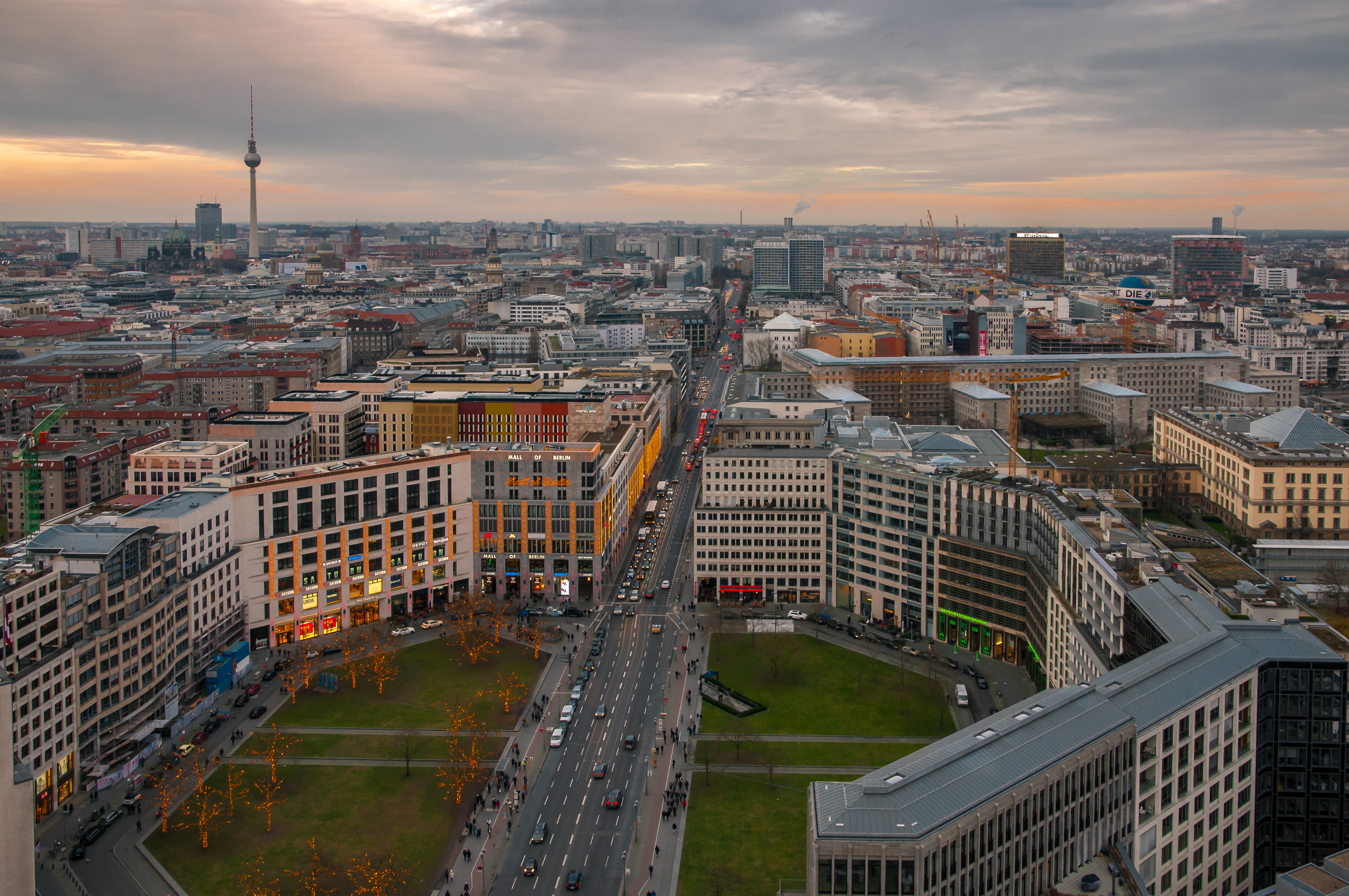
- Leipziger Platz from above, 2018
- Interactive map of Leipziger Platz
- Former names: Achteck am Potsdamer Thor or Octogon or Oktogon; (1734–1814)
- Part of: Bundesstraße 1
- Namesake: Battle of Leipzig
- Type: Public square
- Location: Berlin, Germany
- Quarter: Mitte
- Nearest metro station: Potsdamer Platz
- Coordinates: 52°30′35″N 13°22′42″E
- West end: Potsdamer Straße; Potsdamer Platz; Stresemannstraße; Ebertstraße
- East end: Leipziger Straße

Construction
- Construction start: 1732
- Inauguration: Generally: 1734; Current name: 15 September 1814

Leipziger Platz is an octagonal square in the center of Berlin. It is located along Leipziger Straße east of (and adjacent to) Potsdamer Platz.

== History ==
=== Layout and original architecture ===
The square with the shape of an octagon, initially also officially called Octogon, was laid out together with the square-shaped Pariser Platz (also: Quareé) and the circular Belle-Alliance-Platz (also: Rondell, since 1947 Mehringplatz) according to plans by Philipp Gerlach in 1734 and increasingly enclosed by representative residential, administrative and commercial buildings. All three squares of the urban ensemble were named in 1814/1815 in memory of the wars of liberation. In 1814, the Octagon was given its name in memory of the Battle of the Nations near Leipzig (Völkerschlacht), aligned with Leipziger Straße, which had existed long before.

In 1796, the Academy of Arts held a contest to design a memorial for Frederick II of Prussia. Friedrich Gilly proposed a temple monument to be placed on Leipziger Platz in Berlin for this purpose. The design was never built, but it can be viewed in the Kupferstichkabinett Berlin (Museum of Prints and Drawings).

In imperial times (1871-1918), the Prussian Ministry of Agriculture was located on the south side (nos. 6-10), the Prussian Ministry of Trade on the southeast corner, and the Reichsmarineamt (Navy Ministry) on the northeast corner at no. 13. The Mosse Palace extended from Leipziger Platz 15 on the north side to Voßstraße. Leipziger Platz 16 was originally built with the Palais Bleichröder. On 27 May 1902, James von Bleichröder transferred the building to the then Kaiserlicher Automobil Club (KAC, today: Automobilclub von Deutschland, AvD). In November 2011, it became known that the AvD had sold the property to a real estate investor. On its western side, Leipziger Platz merges into the better-known Potsdamer Platz. The Zoll- und Akzisemauer (Customs and Acquisition Wall) separated the two squares until it was demolished in 1867, but the Potsdamer Tor remained standing. After 1867, the importance of the area shifted in favour of Potsdamer Platz, which grew into an important traffic hub. Leipziger Platz developed into an important business address in Berlin, partly due to the construction of the Wertheim department stores at the end of the 19th century.

The actual landscaped square area was initially separated from the development by means of a large iron grille against the public footpaths around the square. In 1902, therefore, Berlin's municipal park deputation decided to open up the square and replace the boundary with a low enclosure. The new green space design was entrusted to the horticultural director Hermann Mächtig with the task of giving special protection to the "beautiful hundred-year-old linden trees" in the process.

=== Since the Second World War ===
Leipziger Platz was reduced to ruins during the Second World War and was once part of the no man's land surrounding the Berlin Wall, but has since been reconstructed in its original configuration, albeit with modern architecture.

Prior to the war, the square was home to the Reichsmarineamt (Reich Navy Office, originally on Leipziger Platz 13, moved to No. 17/Voßstraße No. 20 in the 1900s), the Wertheim flagship department store (numbers 12-13), the Mosse-Palais (headquarters of the German publisher Hans Lachmann-Mosse, Leipziger Platz 15), Palast-Hotel (No. 18-19) and the Prussian Ministry of Agriculture (No. 6-9). Today, it is home to the Canadian Embassy. There is also a little piece of the Berlin Wall located in the southern half.
