= Beale Piano =

Australian piano manufacturer

Beale Piano is a brand of pianos which was manufactured in Australia from 1893 to 1975, conscious of the Australian climate. The branded piano is now made in China.

== Commencement ==
=== Importing business ===
Octavius Beale (1850–1930) established a business to import sewing machines, and then pianos, in Sydney in 1879. He imported German upright pianos, of which a few survive today – these are known as "Habsburg Beale". At that time, it was common practice to import German-made pianos and attach local branding.

Prior to establishing this business, Beale had been involved with Hugo Wertheim in a piano and sewing machine importing business in Melbourne.

=== Australian manufacture ===
In 1893, Beale established Australia's first piano factory in Sydney, but sold off the manufacturing of sewing machines.

On Monday 23 December 1901, the Beale and Company Limited opened a new four-storey 120 by 60 feet (37 m × 18 m) factory at Trafalgar Street, Annandale (inner-west Sydney), before numerous dignitaries including prime minister Edmund Barton, home secretary Sir William Lyne, Cardinal Francis Moran, and Archbishop Michael Kelly. The factory was to perform wood-working and finishing.

The Beale factory was self-contained and made every element of the pianos, resulting in a broad range of trades working to produce instruments. Activities conducted in the factory included:

- brass and iron foundries;
- timber works, including drying kilns, manufacture of veneers, joinery and cabinetry;
- paint and pattern shops;
- machining and electroplating;
- keyboard action-making and fitting;
- tuning and intoning;
- polishing rooms; and
- experimental laboratories.

(By 1908, there were 400 employees at the Sydney factory.)

Beale introduced the all-iron tuning system, for which a patent was granted in 1902. This tuning system was referred to in earlier Beale pianos as the "Beale-Vader tuning system".

Also, Beale focused on making pianos with local timbers and sought to make pianos which were suited to the changeable Australian climate. In time the company used timbers from North Queensland for the veneers. Australian iron was used to make the patented frames in the company's foundries, as well as Australian copper, and felt from Australian merino wool.

By 1910, Beale piano models included:

- concert grand piano (in walnut);
- Alexandra (with walnut inlay);
- Chippendale, a smaller piano;
- Harmonite upright royal grand;
- Imperial upright grand; and
- Northcote upright grand.

These came with a twenty-five year warranty, for a superior product and unrivalled in the Australian climate.

At this time, Beale pianos were exclusively supplied to the Strand Palace Hotel, London.

Beale pianos were presented the 1924 British Empire Exhibition, being "outstanding exhibits".

Beale and Co. went on to claim being the largest piano factory in the British Empire by the 1930s. A sawmill was owned by the company at Bulga, New South Wales. The business continued to operate after Octavius Beale's death, aged 80, in a car accident in December 1930.

==== Showrooms ====
Beale and Company opened a number of showrooms over time, including by 1884, ten branches in Queensland, including an opulent and spacious 70 by 24 feet (21.3 m × 7.3 m) hall with large mirrors in Queen Street, Brisbane. They were selling both Hapsburg and Werthiem Machines.

By 1910, the Western Australian manager was Octavius' son Francis Edgar Beale.

A showroom was opened in January 1929, in Wollongong at Crown and Church Streets, selling pianos, player pianos, re-enacting pianos, gramaphones, as well as records and roll music. The showroom moved to the Woolworth's Building, Church Street in November 1936; at the same time of the release of the Beale Bijou piano, said to be "a small piano with a grand tone". A range of Beale Radio products and the Beale airconditioned ice refrigerator were also on display. By 1941, the showroom was at 59 Keira Street. The Bijou piano was still manufactured by December 1949, but the showroom had closed.

A piano showroom also was established at 160 Forest Road, Hurstville, by 1944.

== Liquidation ==
A decline in piano purchase was noted by the early 1930s. The Beale and Co. Limited was going to be voluntarily liquidated in October 1939, with a difficult financial position, due to the decline: Production was 10% of the total production of ten years prior. Five other Australian manufacturers had been wound up between 1927 and 1939. with an increase in radios and gramophones.

However by November 1940, the company was not wound up, and started to trade profitably. The stay in proceedings continued into 1944. Increases in net profit increased for 1946, and 1950.

== War effort ==
During World War II, production of pianos was suspended to make way for the manufacture of wooden parts for de Havilland Mosquito aircraft. Australian construction saw the first wood-laminate constructed bomber tested in July 1943, 225 produced at Bankstown, and the last one delivered in July 1948.

=== Post-war resumption ===
After the war Beale recommenced production of pianos. The business was sold to W. H. Paling & Co. in 1961.

Production of pianos in Australia ceased in 1975. It is estimated Beale produced 95,000 pianos in Australia.

== Today ==
The Beale brand is now applied to pianos which are manufactured in China by Pearl River Piano Group.

While Australia no longer mass-produces pianos, there are two Australian manufacturers of very high quality grand pianos – Overs and Stuart and Sons. Their pianos present a showcase for Australian piano manufacturing. Overs pianos are pianos built by other makers which Overs redesigns and improves tonally and sometimes structurally depending on the make, age and client's order and budget. A third maker Mr. Court had built some pianos in Darwin in the last twenty years.

== See also ==
- Wertheim Piano
- Stuart and Sons
