= Wertheim Piano =

Australian piano brand

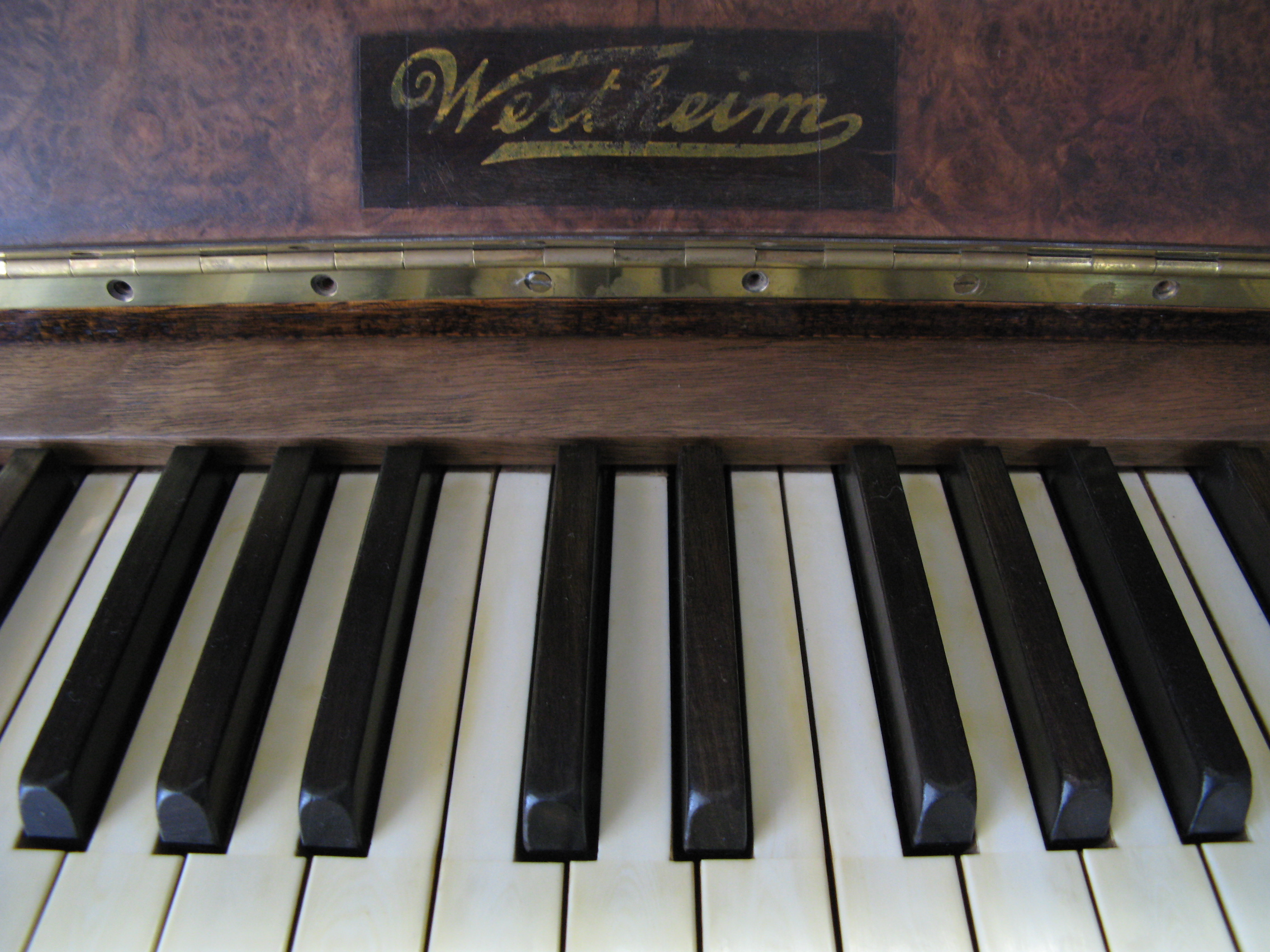
- The logo and keys of a late Wertheim upright piano from between 1925–1930
- Industry: Musical instruments
- Founded: 1880s (imports), 1908 (current)
- Founder: Hugo Wertheim (1854–1919)
- Headquarters: Melbourne, Australia
- Key people: Hugo Wertheim, Herbert Wertheim
- Products: Grand pianos and upright pianos
- Number of employees: 300–400 at peak

Wertheim is an Australian brand of pianos, formerly produced in Richmond, a suburb of Melbourne, Australia. Around 18,000 upright pianos were made in Melbourne between 1908 and 1935. They were designed for the south-eastern Australian climate and were a popular all-purpose piano.

They were used in a range of settings such as schools and public halls, as they were renowned for their ability to stay in tune for prolonged periods of time, requiring little maintenance. They were also used by piano teachers and for professional live performance, the most famous of which was for performances by Dame Nellie Melba, who frequently requested that Wertheim Pianos be used during her performances.

The business was very successful and the Wertheim family achieved celebrity status in Australia during the 1920s. However, after the 1929 Great Depression and with declining demand for pianos, the factory closed in 1935. Today, Wertheim is still an Australian owned company and the Wertheim brand name is used for a range of pianos that are produced overseas in China and South Korea. Original Wertheim pianos undamaged and fully restored can be potentially quite valuable.

== History ==
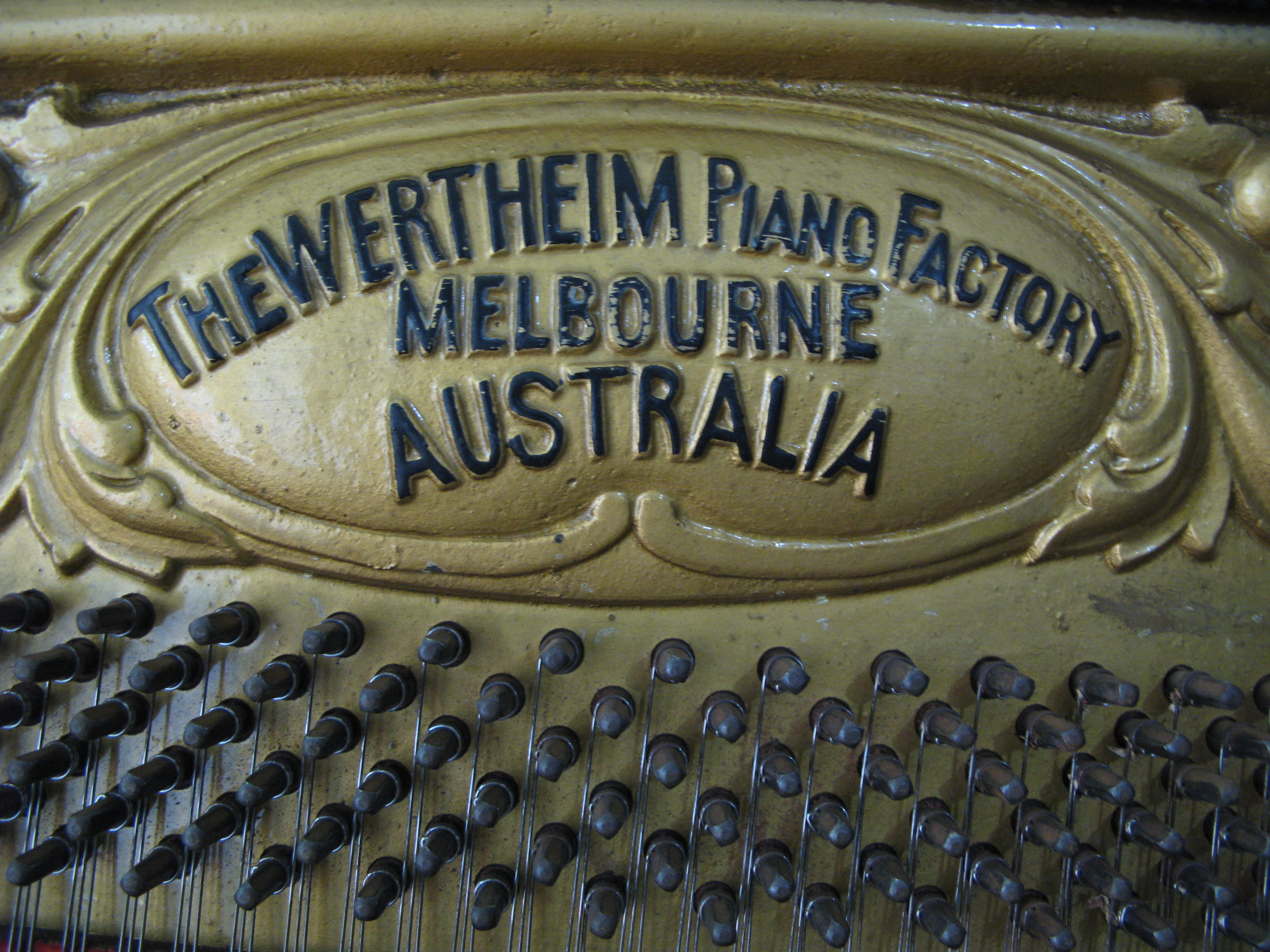
Wertheim casting logo

=== Early history ===
Hugo Wertheim migrated from Frankfurt, Germany to Melbourne, Australia as a reasonably wealthy man, in 1875 after being sent by his uncle, Joseph Wertheim, to travel the world as an agent for the family's sewing machine business. He opened two showrooms in Bourke & Collins Streets, importing German goods such as pianos, harmoniums and bicycles, but later focussed his attention on the demand for pianos in the then, new colony of Australia. Wertheim began importing cheap German pianos and re-badging them as "The Planet" and "Habsburg Wertheim" possibly as early as 1880. Around the turn of the century, Wertheim sent his eldest son, Herbert, to learn the piano manufacturing trade in the United States and tour the continent before returning to run the new Melbourne enterprise.

=== 1908–1918 ===
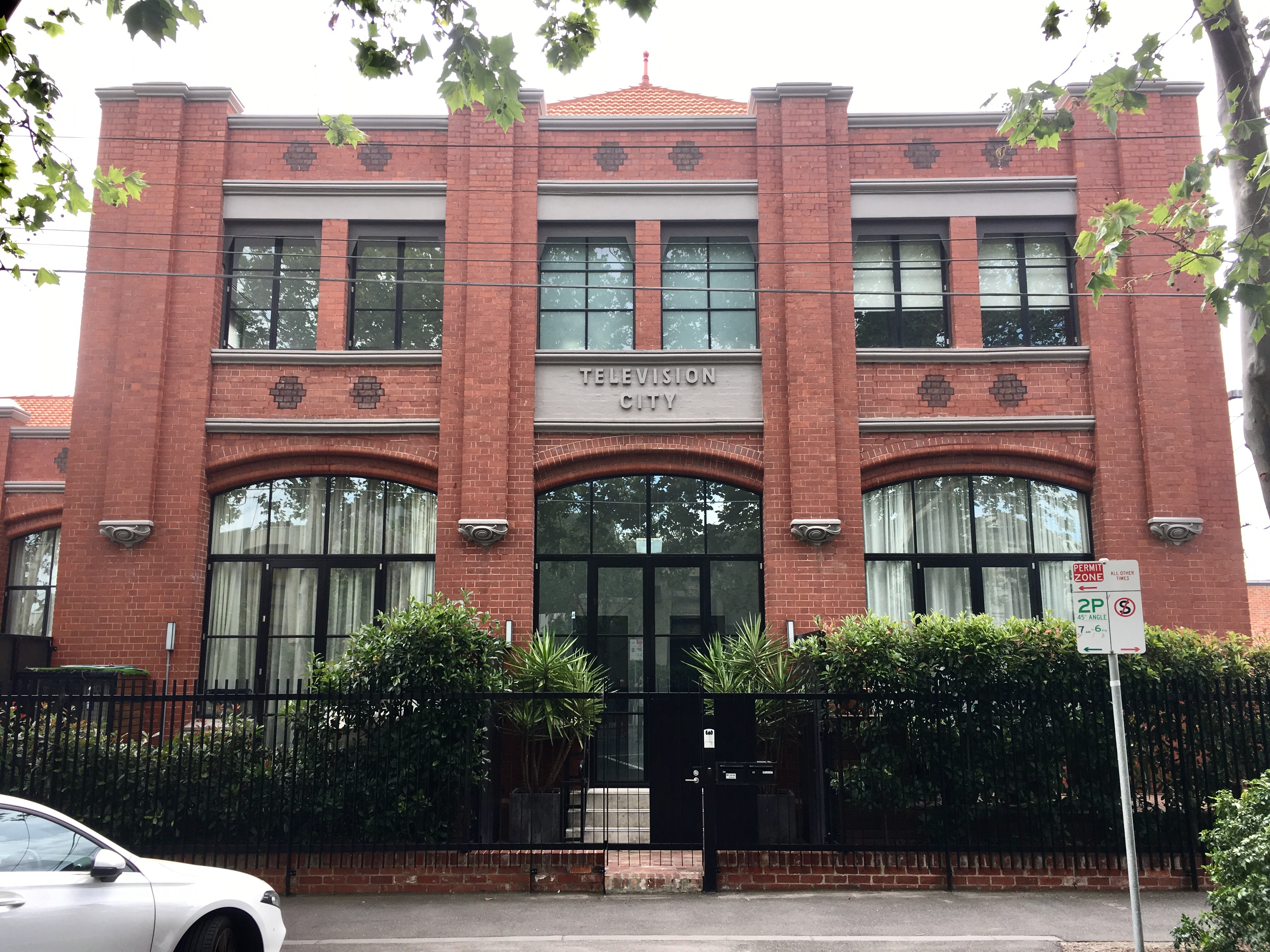
Wertheim Factory, Richmond in 2019

While Wertheim's son was overseas, he commissioned architect Nahum Barnet, who had worked for Steinway, Bechstein, Kaps and others, to design a prestigious factory. Wertheim spent somewhere between $25 and $75 thousand on the factory which was designed in a Free Arts and Crafts style applied to an industrial building. The investment was of such significance in Australia at the time that Prime Minister Alfred Deakin laid the factory's foundation stone on 21 October 1908. The structure was built by R. McDonald on 16,000 square metres (4 acres) of land at 22 Bendigo Street, Richmond and when completed hosted 50,000 squares of space, its own power generator and tram line. At its peak, the factory was the largest piano factory in Australia, employed around 300 people and produced up to 2,000 pianos a year, including 12 grand pianos.

=== 1919–1935 ===
Hugo Wertheim died in 1919, leaving his son Herbert, to run the business. His father's investment in the factory paid off both financially and socially, and the Wertheim family enjoyed celebrity status in Australia. This was particularly noteworthy as a generation of the Wertheim family were non-practicing Jews, yet enjoyed "Melbourne Club status" during a time of anti-Semitism. However, by the late 1920s, none of the third generation of the family was interested in running the business, which also suffered from the 1929 depression. The Wertheim's struggled on by sharing the Richmond site with three competitors Allans, Paling's and Sutton's. In the early 1930s, the Great Depression and the popularity of the Wireless decreased demand for pianos and the factory was closed in 1935 after producing around 18,000 pianos over 27 years.

=== Recent history ===
The closure of the Wertheim factory was somewhat of a family disagreement, as Herbert wanted to continue producing pianos while his mother did not. She had a casting vote on the board which decided to sell the property to Heinz to become the site for food preserving. With the advent of television in the 1950s, the then disused factory became the studios for the GTV 9 television station in 1956.

== 1908–1935 Pianos ==
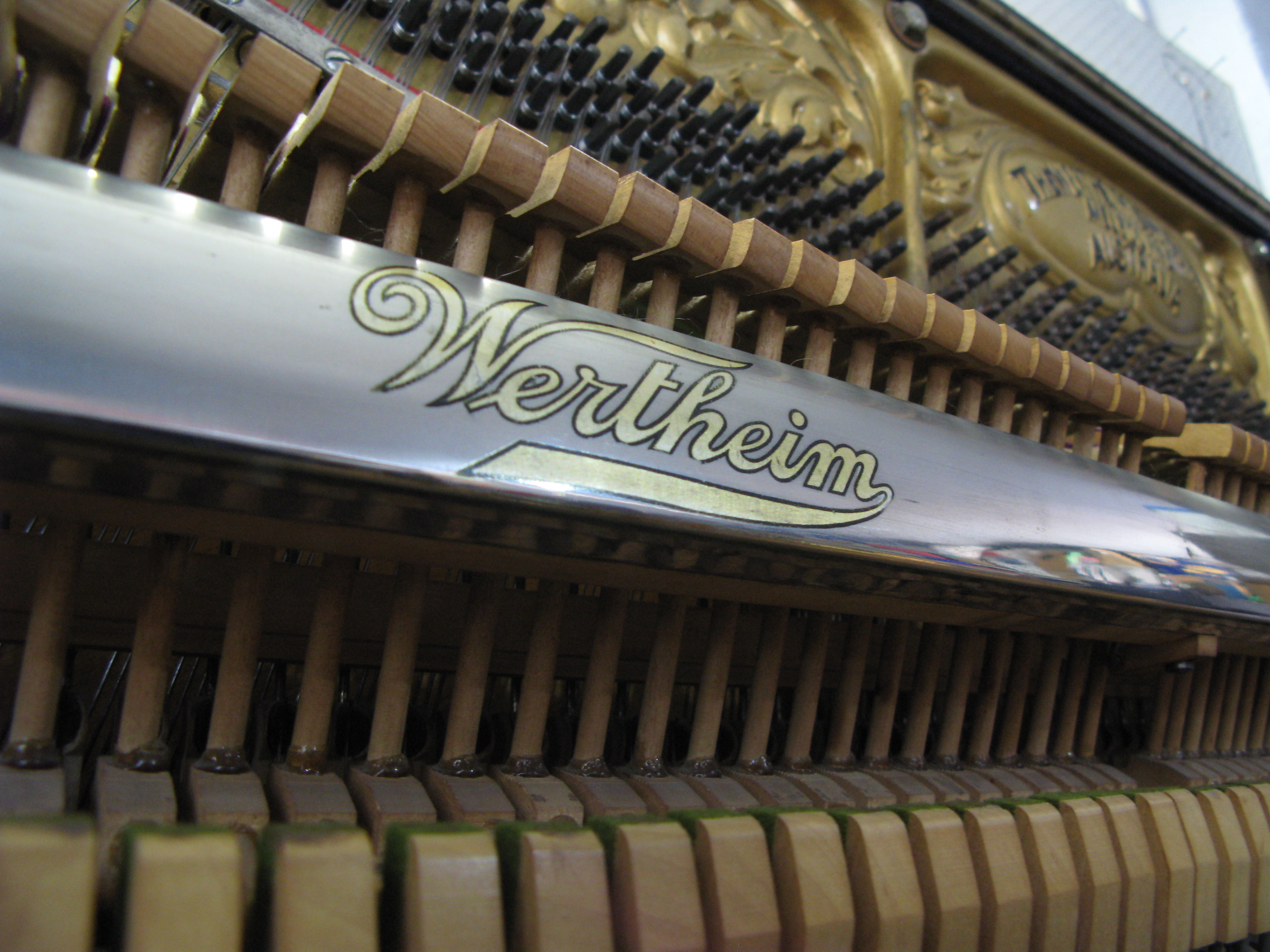
Internals of a Wertheim upright piano

These pianos were hand crafted in the factory on Bendigo Street, Richmond, using predominantly Australian materials. These were the first pianos ever manufactured in the state of Victoria. Around 18,000 were produced, many were exported interstate and overseas. They were used for many purposes, from live performance to performance halls, school theatres and by piano teachers. They were designed for the Australian climate and were noted for their ability to stay in tune for long periods of time. Many of these pianos are still in use today around Australia and, undamaged or restored, can be quite valuable.

== Current Pianos ==
Today, the Wertheim name is owned by John Martin after Allans Music sold in 2002. John, registered the Wertheim piano brand for the international market and commenced manufacturing in sophisticated factories in Korea and China owned by Korean company Young Chang. (Young Chang has manufactured pianos for Yamaha as well as piano components for Steinway and other notable European piano brands.)

In 2006 Young Chang piano factories were acquired by Hyundai Development Corporation in Korea. John Martin was involved in working with the CEO, JP Park, to streamline the piano manufacturing procedures and employ cutting edge American piano designer, Delwin Fandrich, to redesign the pianos.

== Other information ==
- Dame Nellie Melba was known to frequently request that Wertheim Pianos be used for her performances.
- The street on the northern boundary of the Bendigo Street Factory was named after Wertheim.
- Former Victorian premier Jeff Kennett is a great-grandson of Hugo Wertheim.
- The Bendigo Street Factory is protected by local heritage laws and is under consideration for state heritage listing.

== See also ==
- Wertheim (company)

Australian Pianos:

- Beale Piano
- Stuart and Sons
