= Gerard Willems =

Dutch-Australian pianist and teacher

- Born: Gerardus Maria Willems; 19 August 1946 (age 80); Tilburg, Netherlands
- Occupation: Musician
- Instruments: Classical Piano, clarinet
- Formerly of: Australian Ballet

Gerard Willems AM (born Gerardus Maria Willems; 19 August 1946) is a Dutch-Australian classical pianist and teacher. He was the first Australian pianist to record the complete series of 32 piano sonatas by Ludwig van Beethoven. He also recorded Beethoven's five piano concertos, the Diabelli Variations, C minor variations, Andante favori, Für Elise and the 3 Electoral "Kurfürstensonaten" sonatas as well as a reconstructed "Fantasy Sonata in D". These recordings feature the Australian designed and manufactured Stuart & Sons piano. This series of recordings constitutes the largest classical music recording project ever undertaken in Australia, and Willems became the best selling classical artist in Australia's recording history.

== Biography ==
Willems was born and grew up in Tilburg, Netherlands. He was named after his maternal grandfather, a church organist, composer and piano builder. He received a scholarship from the Brabant Conservatorium, but the Soviet invasion of Hungary in 1956 caused his parents, fearful of a domino effect, to migrate to Australia when he was 12, in 1958. Until he was 17, they lived in a migrant camp near Wollongong; his father died in the camp. He entered the Sydney Conservatorium of Music, studying under Gordon Watson. After graduation, he was called up for national service, managing to convince the army he was best suited as a musician, and he played the clarinet in army bands. Willems was employed as the touring pianist for the Australian Ballet, and travelled on tours with dancers such as Margot Fonteyn, Rudolf Nureyev and Mikhail Baryshnikov. He won the Queen Victoria Piano Competition, and later studied under Greville Rothon (assistant to Claudio Arrau) in Munich.

He made debuts in London 1974, Munich 1977 and Amsterdam 1978. He returned to Sydney in 1981 and has taught as senior lecturer, and later chair of the Keyboard Unit, at the Sydney Conservatorium 1981–2008 and is currently an associate professor at Sydney University.

He founded the piano trio Mozartrois, and with them recorded the complete Mozart piano trios, as part of the bicentenary of Mozart's death in 1991. He has appeared in lieder recitals and chamber music concerts.

In 1996, former television producer Brendan Ward persuaded Willems to record Beethoven's 32 piano sonatas. These recordings (12 CDs) were released by the ABC in 3 volumes in 1998, 1999 and 2000. They won successive ARIA Music Awards, in 1999 and 2000, the first time a pianist won the Classical section of the Awards.

In 2001, he won the inaugural Queen Elizabeth II Australian Musical Scholarship. He toured Israel and held the Hephzibah Menuhin Chair in Piano as visiting professor at the Rubin Academy in Jerusalem.

His recordings of the five Beethoven piano concertos were released in 2003. These featured Sinfonia Australis under the conductor Antony Walker. The Piano Concerto No. 5, "Emperor" was also released on DVD in 2004, and won the International DVD Association Award for Music Excellence in 2005. It is now on YouTube.

In 2006, the year of Mozart's 250th birthday, Willems recorded a CD of Mozart favourites for the ABC, including the Variations on the Dutch National Anthem.

In 2010 Willems recorded Beethoven's Diabelli Variations.

In 2013, after he recorded Beethoven's C minor variations, Andante favori, Für Elise, the 3 Electoral "Kurfürstensonaten" sonatas and the reconstructed "Fantasy Sonata in D", the ABC released all the Willems Beethoven recordings in a 14-CD box-set "The Beethoven-Willems Collection".

In 2015, Willems recorded "Morning Mood", a 2-CD set of Edvard Grieg's piano music for the ABC, again using the Stuart Piano.

== Personal life ==
Willems has three children, Marcel and Louise with Judy Willems, and Clara Doroty Eleonore Frey-Willems with Eva Frey. He lives with his second wife, Eva Frey, in Amsterdam.

== Discography ==
List of albums, with selected details
Title	Details
Beethoven: Complete Piano Sonatas Vol. 1	Released: 1995; Format: 3×CD; Label: ABC Classics (ABC 465 077-3)
Beethoven: Complete Piano Sonatas Vol. 2	Released: 1998; Format: 3×CD; Label: ABC Classics (ABC 465 264-2)
Beethoven: Complete Piano Sonatas Vol. 3	Released: 2000; Format: 3×CD; Label: ABC Classics (ABC 465 695-2)
Beethoven: Complete Piano Concertos (with Sinfonia Australis & Antony Walker)	Released: 2003; Format: 3×CD; Label: ABC Classics (9800465)
Beethoven: Diabelli Variations	Released: 2010; Format: CD; Label: ABC Classics (ABC 476 411-3)

== Awards and nominations ==
In 2001 Willems was named the inaugural Queen Elizabeth II Music Scholar by the Australian Elizabethan Theatre Trust.

Also in 2003 he was awarded a Centenary Medal for services to music and in 2012 he was appointed a Member of the Order of Australia (AM).

=== ARIA Music Awards ===
The ARIA Music Awards is an annual awards ceremony that recognises excellence, innovation, and achievement across all genres of Australian music. They commenced in 1987.

Year	Nominee / work	Award	Result	Ref.
1999	Piano: Beethoven Sonatas Volume 1	Best Classical Album	Won	
2000	Beethoven: Complete Piano Sonatas	Best Classical Album	Won	
2004	Beethoven Complete Piano Concertos (with Sinfonia Australis)	Best Classical Album	Nominated	
