= Wilhelm Schimmel =

German piano manufacturer

Schimmel
- Company type: Private
- Industry: Musical instruments
- Founded: 1885
- Founder: Wilhelm Schimmel
- Headquarters: Braunschweig, Germany
- Key people: Viola Schimmel (Granddaughter of Wilhelm Schimmel), Lothar Kiesche
- Products: Grand pianos and upright pianos
- Number of employees: 250
- Parent: Pearl River Piano Group
- Website: schimmel.de

Schimmel is a German piano maker with factories in Braunschweig, Germany and Kalisz, Poland. Their product line has been described as "the most highly awarded German piano".

The company was founded 1885 by Wilhelm Schimmel in Leipzig, Germany. Four generations of the Schimmel family have since managed and grown the family-owned business.

Schimmel Pianos is known for producing "made in Germany" instruments of high quality. Since 2016 Schimmel has been owned by the Pearl River Piano Group in China. All Fridolin Schimmel pianos are made in the Pearl River piano factory in China. (Fridolin Schimmel pianos were formerly made by the Young Chang Piano Company factory.) Over the history, the company has made an impact on the piano industry with new inventions and innovative designs. Schimmel instruments are produced in the Schimmel workshop in Braunschweig, Germany. With more than 40 awards, Schimmel Pianos are the most highly awarded Pianos from German production.

== History ==
=== 1st Generation: Foundation and growth ===
The history of Schimmel Pianos began on 2 May 1885 as Wilhelm Schimmel founded his own workshop in Leipzig, Germany. His slogan "Quality prevails", proved to be right as his business succeeded and his instruments grew popular for their advanced technique, excellent sound and contemporary design.

In May 1894, Wilhelm Schimmel produced his 1000th instrument. The company had moved to bigger workshops due to the increasing production. In 1897, Wilhelm Schimmel built his own state-of-the-art factory in Leipzig-Stötteritz on 4000 m^{2} large grounds. Due to the outstanding playability, the highly developed mechanics and the tonal quality the brand Schimmel soon belonged to the circle of renown pianoforte factories in Leipzig, which used to be, besides Berlin the centre of piano manufacturers in Germany.

Schimmel Pianos soon developed an international reputation as their instruments were exported to Russia, Italy, France, the U.S., Switzerland, and many other countries. Schimmel received the title of purveyor of the Grand Duke of Saxe-Weimar-Eisenach and the purveyor of the King of Romania.

At the World Exhibition in 1913 and 1914, the instruments received first gold medals.

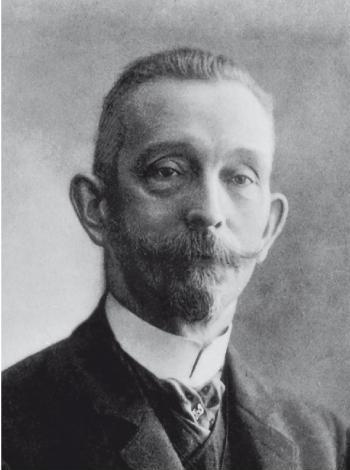
Wilhem Schimmel, company founder

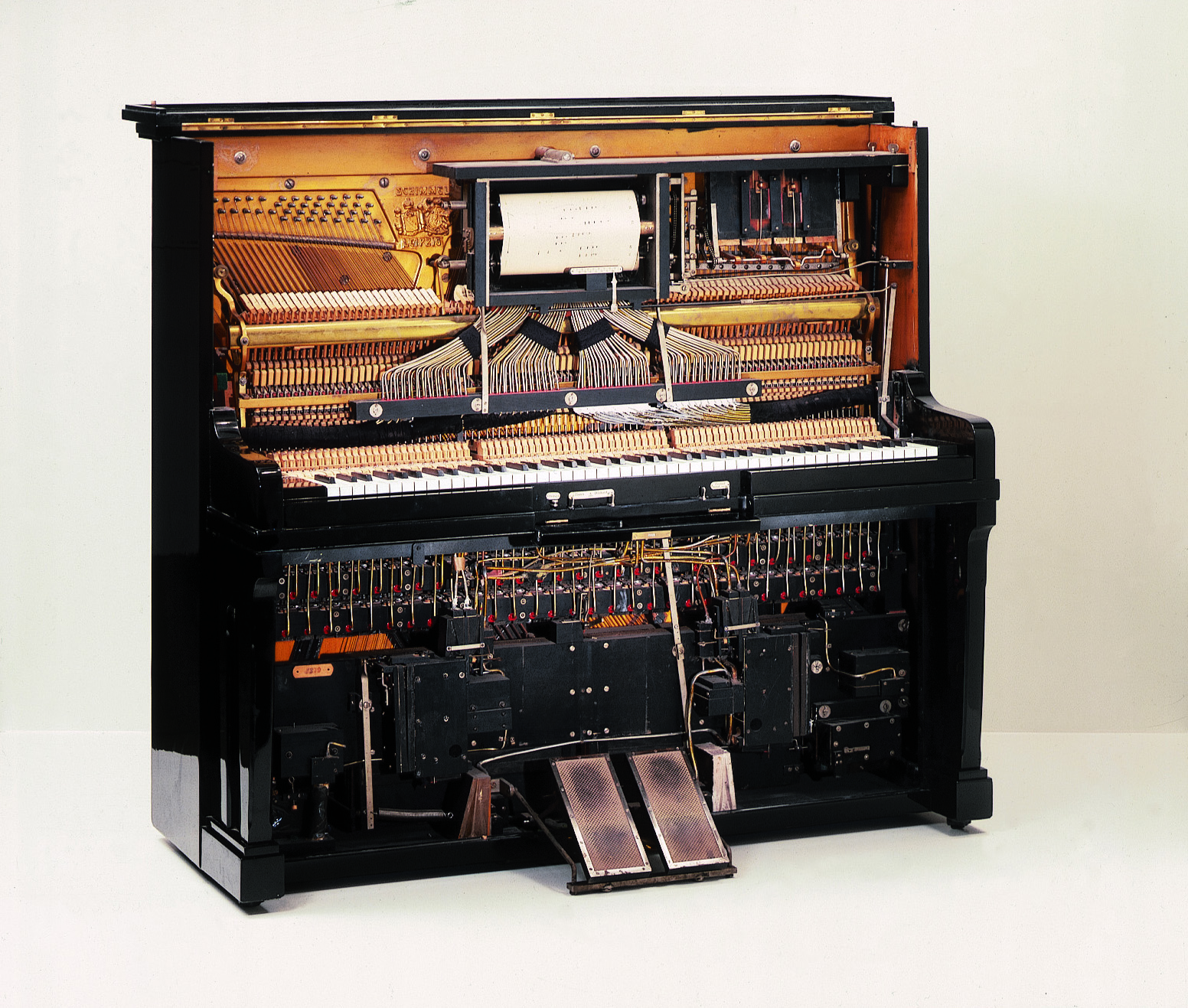
Self-Playing Piano Ducanola by Schimmel

An outstanding technical innovation was the development of a self-playing piano, called Ducanola in around 1915.

=== 2nd Generation: 1927 to 1961 ===
At the age of 73, Wilhelm Schimmel passed the company's management to his son, Wilhelm Arno Schimmel. Due to the economic situation the new manager was faced with difficulties concerning the production as well as the sales of pianos. The Hyperinflation in 1923 was followed by the great depression with the Great Stock Market Crash on Black Friday in 1929. The piano industry also had to compete with the radio and the gramophone.

A number of German piano manufacturers united their businesses in December 1929 to the corporation "Deutsche Piano-Werke-AG" with the aim to overcome the challenging situation by unifying certain operations. The production of the cooperation was located in Luckenwalde and Braunschweig in Germany. Instruments of a higher quality such as Schimmel pianos were produced in Braunschweig. The production of grand pianos stayed in the company in Leipzig. Regarding the difficulty to unite different interests within the organization, the cooperation wasn't fit for the future.

Wilhelm Arno Schimmel left the cooperation and founded the "Wilhelm Schimmel, Pianoforte GmbH" 1932 in Braunschweig, Germany.

For the 50th company jubilee, Schimmel developed a small piano without back posts and a newly designed action. The Modell J 50, contemporary trend design was one of the most important new constructions of the 1930s. Arno Schimmel developed further small pianos with a small height. The smallest model only measures a height of 98 cm with a width of 140 cm. On 8 January, Arno Schimmel called the patent "small piano". Schimmel also produced the smallest grand piano with the length of only 117 cm.

As Braunschweig was the center of the aeroplane industry during the 2nd World War, the city was attacked numerous times by the allies. During the bomb attack in October 1944, a great part of the Schimmel piano factory was destroyed and the production of instruments came to a halt.

After the war ended the factory was rebuilt, first focusing on various kinds of woodwork and furnishing until the production of pianos was continued in 1949.

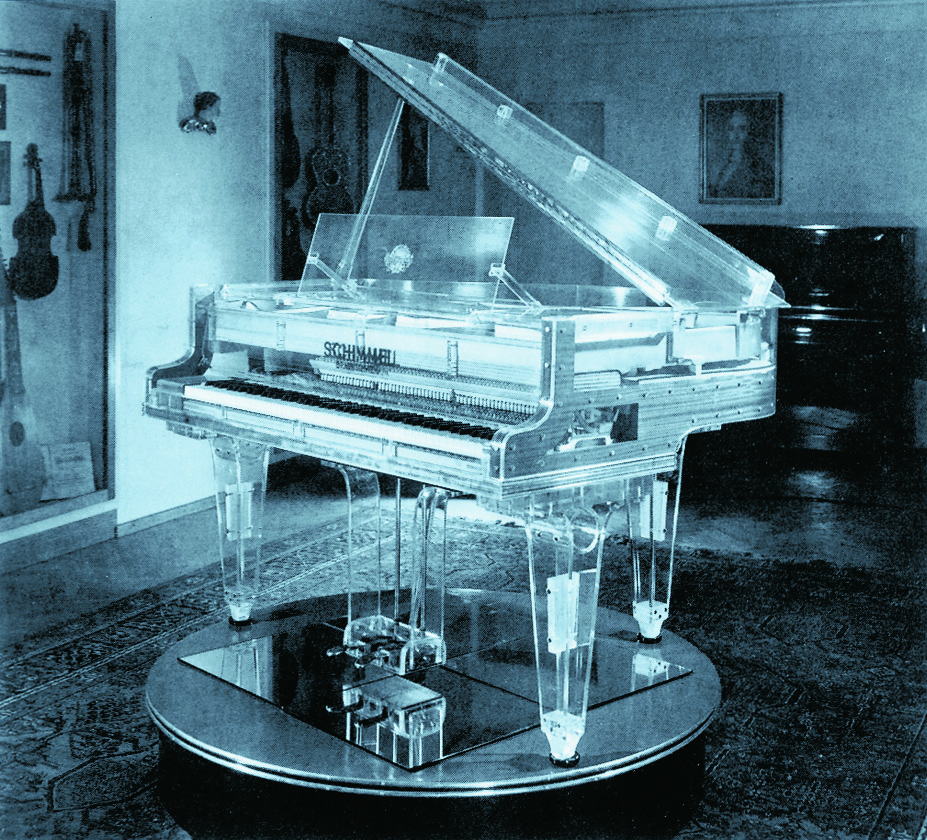
Schimmel glass piano 1951

The 1950s were marked by expansion and new inventions. In 1951 Schimmel presented the first acrylic glass piano in the world on the trade fair in Düsseldorf. The sales boomed during the 50s and end of 1958 Schimmel was the most frequently sold German piano. According to the sales volume Schimmel was the biggest piano manufacturer on the German market: The company exported their pianos worldwide.

=== 3rd Generation: 1961 to 2003 ===
In 1961, Wilhelm Arno Schimmel died unexpectedly. His son, Nikolaus Wilhelm Schimmel (*1934), who was trained as a piano builder as well as businessman took over the company's management. As the 1960s were also marked by a boom in the piano industry, the factory in Braunschweig soon became too small for the expanding production. In 1966, a new factory was built on larger premises in the south of Braunschweig. Over 7.500 instruments left the factory in 1975. In the 1980s, the production and sales had increased to annually 10.000 instruments (including the series Pleyel pianos, produced 1972 to 1996).

In 1985, the company was considered as leading German piano manufacturer. Two-thirds of the production was exported in the European Union, to North America and the Pacific regions.

=== 4th Generation: 2003–today ===
In 2003, Nikolaus W. Schimmel gave the management to the next generation. His son in law, Hannes Schimmel- Vogel.

Regarding the transforming market the company expanded their product line and developed the new product series "Schimmel Konzert" for the premium section. Over the next 10 years, 6 new grand piano and 3 upright piano models were developed. The newly developed and patented method of construction based on the construction of a grand concert piano, which is used for all instruments.

Furthermore, the company invested in research and development and founded another production plant in Kalisz in Poland. Here the series "Wilhelm Schimmel" is produced, which competes with Asian instruments regarding the price, but is produced in Europe.

The 2008 financial crisis had a large impact on Schimmel Pianos. In 2009, the company filed for self-administered insolvency, ending successfully on 30 March 2010. In the following years Schimmel expands on the Asian market, focusing especially on China, the world's largest piano market. To enter the Chinese market successfully the company founded a strategic alliance with the Pearl River Piano Group, the world's largest piano producer in 2016. Pearl River became the majority share holder of Schimmel Pianos with the Schimmel family keeping 10% if the company. Schimmel "Konzert" and "Classic" production will continue in Braunschweig, Germany and "Wilhelm Schimmel" production will continue in Kalisz, Poland.

Schimmel developed a new piano brand, "Fridolin Schimmel" especially for the Asian market, The model is designed by Schimmel for piano beginners and is manufactured in the Pearl River Piano Group factory in Guangzhou, China.

In May 2019, Schimmel Pianos found a subsidiary company in China responsible for all sales and marketing activities in China.

== Products ==
Schimmel produces the models "Konzert" and "Classic" in the Schimmel Pianos factory in Braunschweig, Germany.

The series "Schimmel Konzert" includes six grand pianos and three upright piano models, each available in different designs and colors. The series was developed to cater for the needs of professional pianists. The instruments can be found worldwide on concert and theater stages and has received awards for the sound and construction.

The series "Schimmel Classic" includes three grand pianos and twelve upright pianos also in different models.

== Current Grand Piano Models ==
=== Schimmel Konzert ===
Model	Length	Weight
K 280 Tradition	280 cm (9 ft 2 in)	535 kg
K 256 Tradition	256 cm (8 ft 5 in)	484 kg
K 230 Tradition	230 cm (7 ft 7 in)	434 kg
K 219 Tradition	219 cm (7 ft 2 in)	414 kg
K 195 Tradition	195 cm (6 ft 5 in)	376 kg
K 175 Tradition	175 cm (5 ft 9 in)	353 kg

=== Schimmel Classic ===
Model	Length	Weight
C 213 Tradition	213 cm (7 ft 0 in)	395 kg
C 189 Tradition	189 cm (6 ft 2 in)	361 kg
C 169 Tradition	169 cm (5 ft 7 in)	338 kg

== Current Upright Piano Models ==
=== Schimmel Konzert ===
Model	Height	Weight
K 132 Tradition	132 cm (52 in)	263 kg
K 125 Tradition	125 cm (49 in)	251 kg
K 122 Elegance	122 cm (48 in)	238 kg

=== Schimmel Classic ===
Model	Height	Weight
C 130 Tradition	130 cm (51 in)	250 kg
C 126 Tradition	126 cm (50 in)	248 kg
C 121 Tradition	121 cm (48 in)	249 kg
C 121 Tradition Marketerie	121 cm (48 in)	249 kg
C 121 Tradition Prestige	121 cm (48 in)	249 kg
C 121 Tradition Noblesse	121 cm (48 in)	249 kg
C 121 Elegance Manhattan	121 cm (48 in)	249 kg
C 121 Royal	121 cm (48 in)	249 kg
C 121 Royal Intarsie Flora	121 cm (48 in)	249 kg
C 116 Tradition	116 cm (46 in)	248 kg
C 116 Modern	116 cm (46 in)	248 kg
C 116 Modern Cubus	116 cm (46 in)	248 kg

== Special models ==
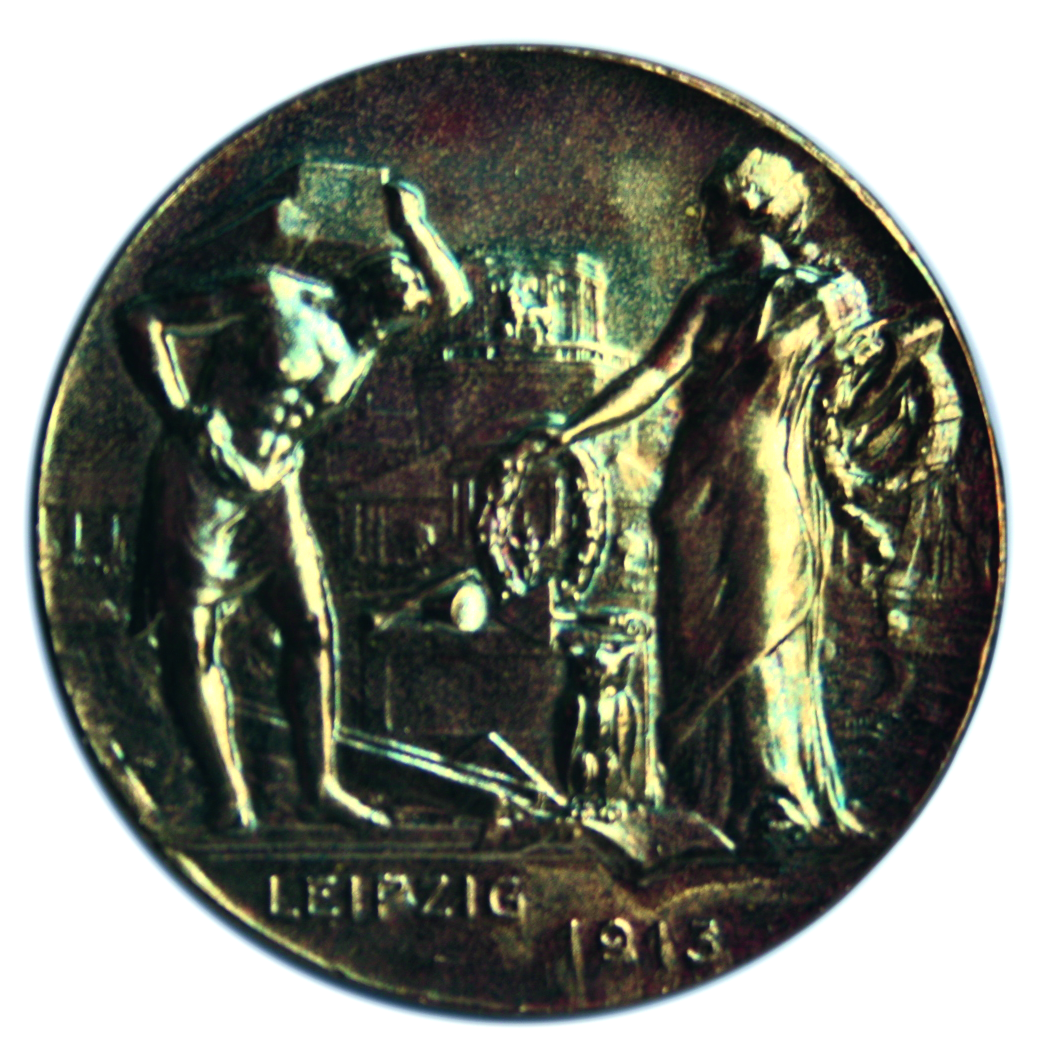
Medal for Wilhelmina

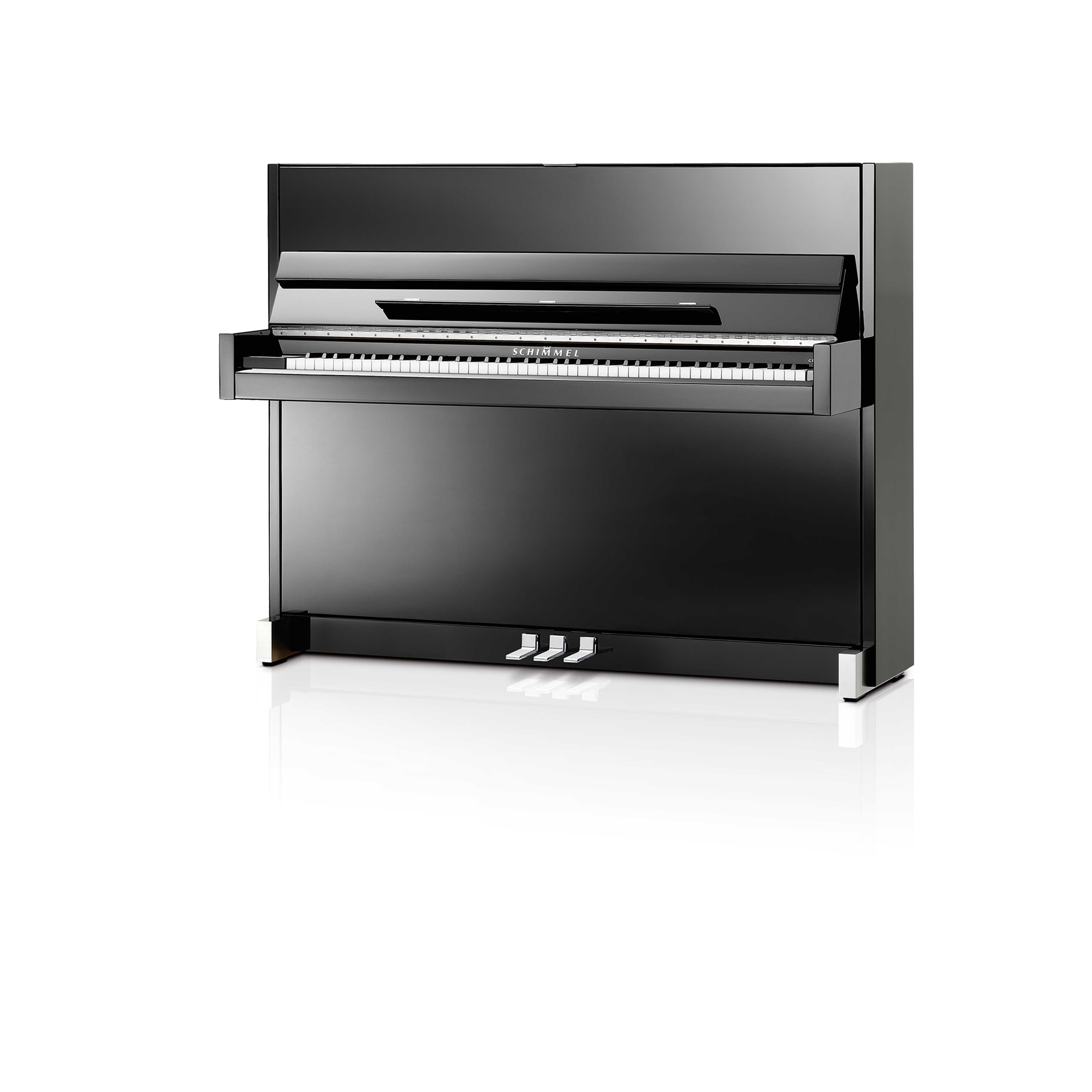
Schimmel Classic C116 M

A contemporary design has ever since been a prominent feature of Schimmel pianos. In the course of the company history, extraordinary instruments have been designed. In 1913 the Schimmel piano Wilhelmina has been awarded for its outstanding design with a gold medal at the world fair in Leipzig.

Schimmel Pianos developed numerous instruments in the following years which were distinguished from their competitors by their designs.

The Schimmel piano "Classic" model C 116 received numerous awards, such as the Red Dot Design Award 2018 for its clear minimalist and timeless design.

== Art collection ==
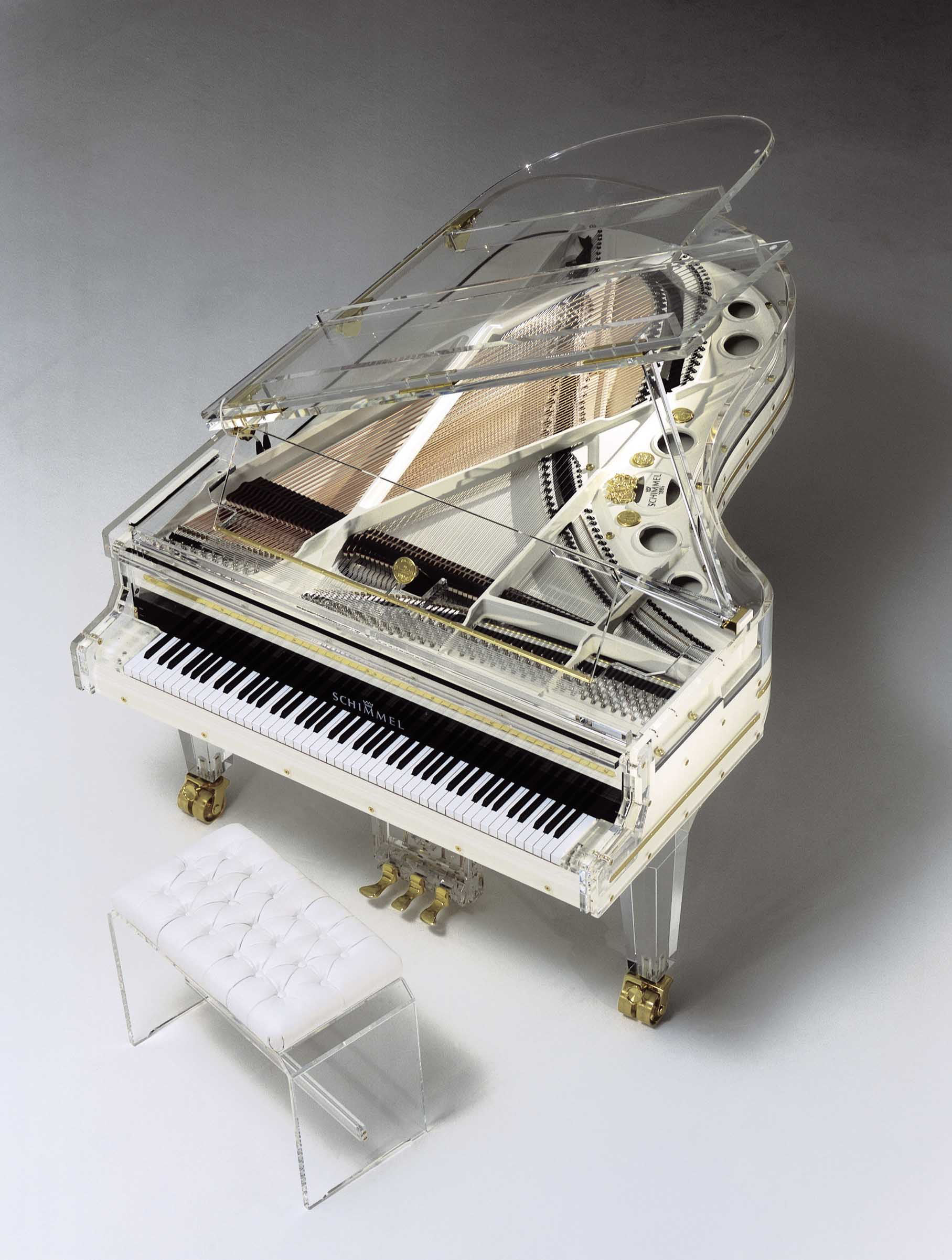
Schimmel Glass Piano

Together with renowned artists the German piano manufacturer developed the Schimmel Art Collection.

1952 Schimmel Pianos caused a sensation with the presentation of the first transparent acrylic glass piano. The glass piano was improved 30 years later by Nicholas Schimmel. The piano soon became famous as it toured the world with the entertainer Udo Jürgens. Today the glass piano is highly demanded for TV shows, concerts tours and stages.

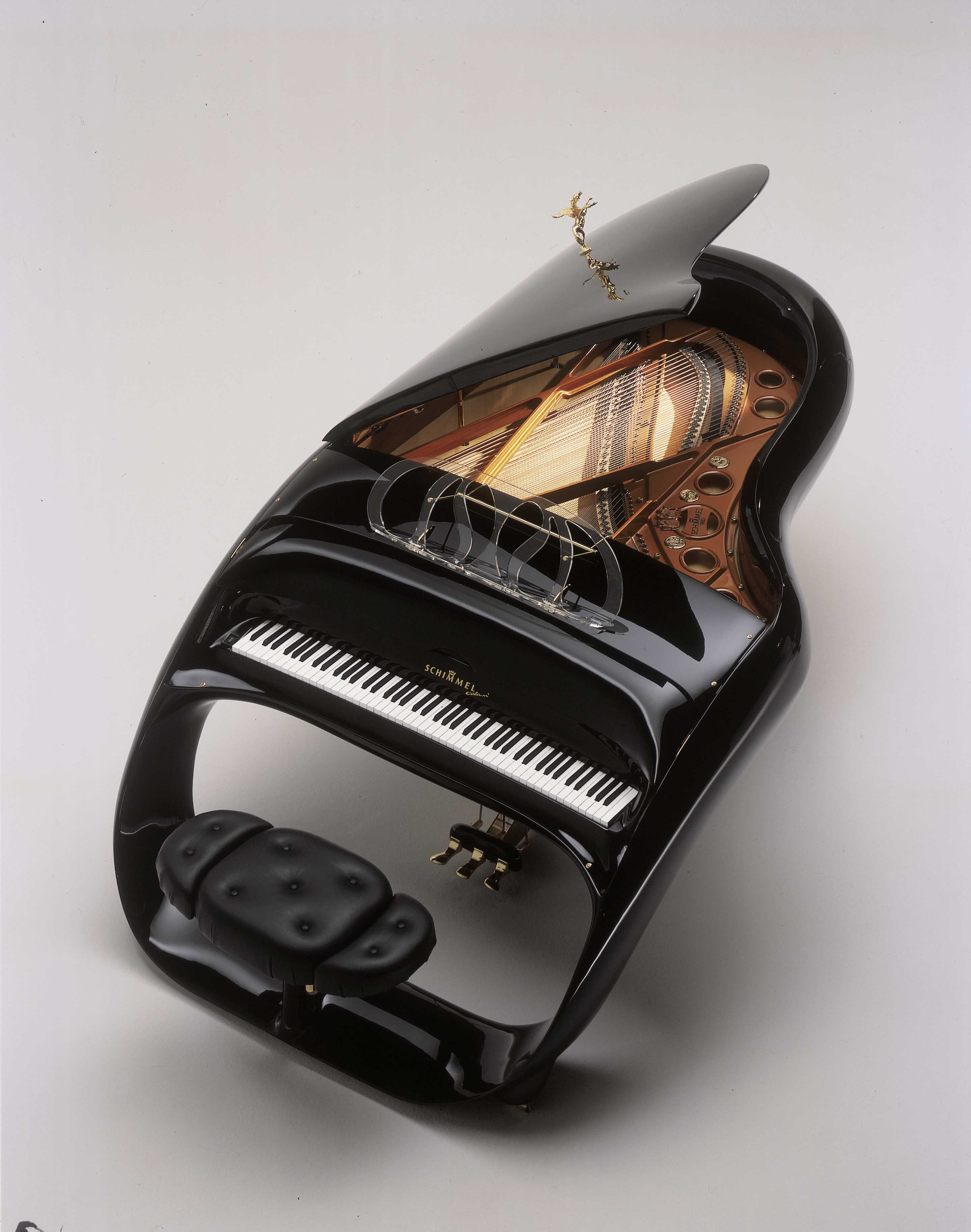
Schimmel Pegasus Piano

The Pegasus piano designed in cooperation with Luigi Colani transcended the traditional form of pianos. The piano is positioned on an acrylic glass plate so the piano seems to hover in mid-air. The stool is part of the piano body and the lid opens automatically.

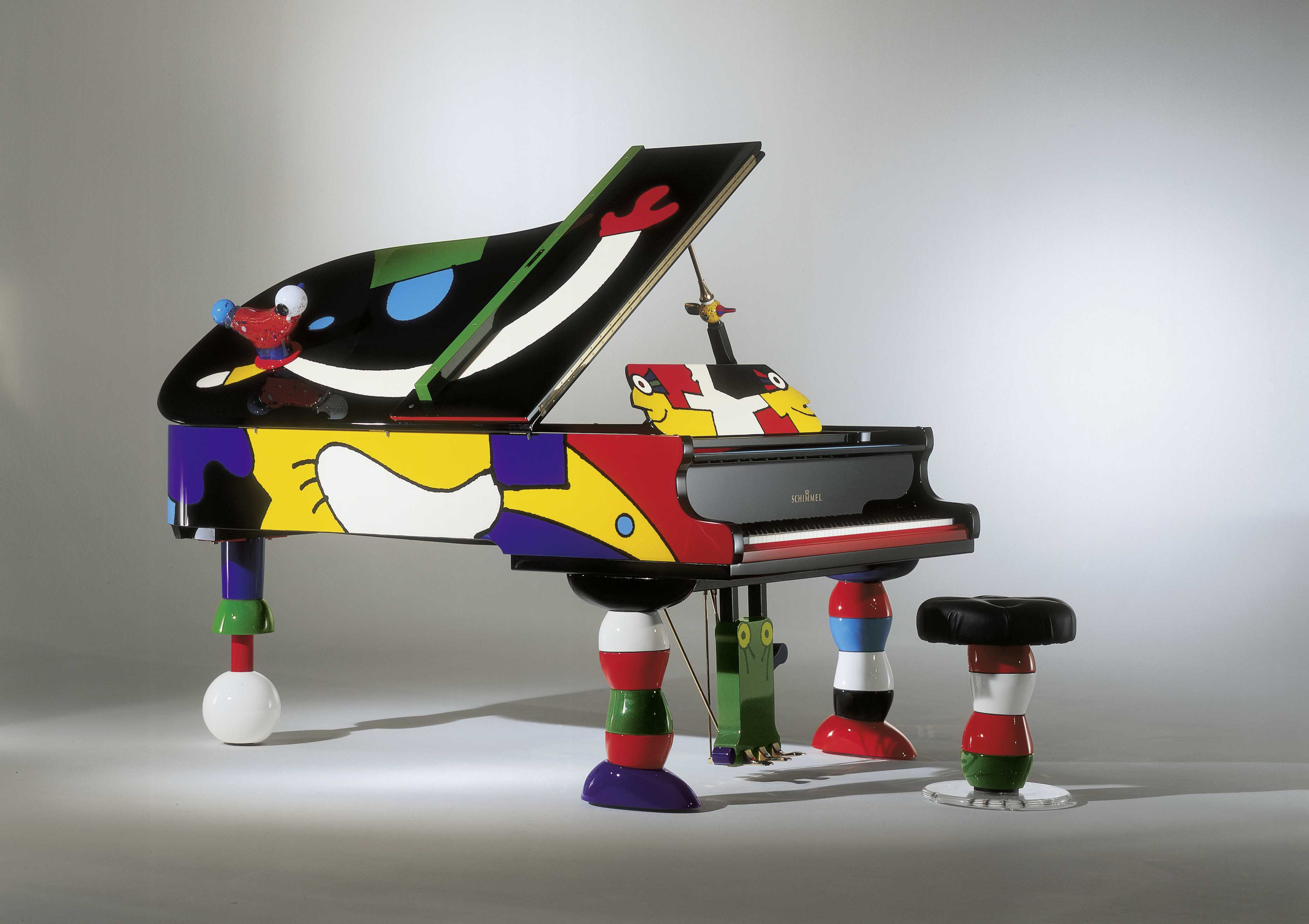
Schimmel Otma Alt Piano

The grand piano designed by the artist Otmar Alt attracts attention with its colorful, flamboyant design.

== Brands ==
In addition to the Schimmel brand, Schimmel Pianos manufactures two other brands: Wilhelm Schimmel for the mid-level market and Fridolin Schimmel for the entry-level market.

=== Wilhelm Schimmel ===
Made for the mid-level piano market, the Wilhelm Schimmel brand consists of two grand pianos and four upright piano models in different designs. The brand is named after Wilhelm Schimmel, the company's founder. The instruments are made for young piano players, offering them pianos of high quality to an affordable price.

The instruments are produced in the Schimmel production site in Kalisz, Poland.

=== Fridolin Schimmel ===
Made for the entry-level piano market, the Fridolin Schimmel brand consists of four upright piano models in different colors and designs The brand is named after Fridolin Schimmel, the older brother of Wilhelm Schimmel, who founded his own piano workshop in 1893 in the U.S. The instruments are made for beginners.

The instruments are designed by Schimmel and build by Pearl River Piano Group factory in Guangzhou, China.

== Awards ==
Instruments by Schimmel Pianos have received numerous awards, making Schimmel the most highly awarded German piano brand.

=== Awarded instruments, Konzert series ===
- K 230 T: Diapason d’Or by Diapason, Choc by Le Monde de la musique, Maestro by Pianiste Magazine
- K 132 T: Diapason d’Or by Diapason, Maestro by Pianiste Magazine
- K 125 T: Diapason d’Or by Diapason, iF Product Design Award 2011, German Design Award 2012 Nominee
- K 122 E: Diapason d’Or by Diapason, Choc by Le Monde de la musique

=== Awarded Instruments, Classic series ===
- C 213 T: Choc by Le Monde de la musique
- C 189 T: Maestro by Pianiste Magazine
- C 169 T: Diapason d’Or dans Diapason, Choc by Le Monde de la musique
- C 130 T: Diapason d’Or dans Diapason
- C 120 E: Choc by Le Monde de la Musique, Choc by Classica
- C 116 T: Diapason d’Or by Diapason, Maestro by Pianiste Magazine
- C 116 Modern Cubus: Focus Open Silver 2011, iF Product Design Award 2011, German Design Award 2012 Nominee
- C 116 M: reddot design award winner 2008, GOOD DESIGN by the Chicago Athenaeum Museum of Architecture and Design, Designpreis 2009 Nominee by Bundesministerium für Wirtschaft und Technologie, German Design Award 2011 Nominee, German Design Award 2010 Nominee

=== Awarded instruments, Wilhelm Schimmel series ===
- W118: Diapason d’Or by Diapason, Maestro by Pianiste Magazine
- W114: Maestro by Pianiste Magazine
