= Godfreys =

Australian home appliance retailer

- Type: Private
- Industry: Floorcare and cleaning
- Founded: 1931; 95 years ago
- Founder: Godfrey Cohen
- Defunct: 2024 (original company)
- Headquarters: Melbourne, Victoria, Australia
- Area served: Australia
- Key people: John Johnston
- Products: Vacuum cleaners; steam mops; carpet cleaners; stick vacuums; robot vacuums; commercial cleaners
- Parent: Future Innovation Holdings
- Website: godfreys.com.au

Godfreys is an Australian retailer in the domestic and commercial floorcare and cleaning industry, headquartered in Melbourne. Founded by Godfrey Cohen in 1931, at its peak it had more than 220 company and franchise-owned stores combined across Australia and New Zealand. The company went into voluntary administration in 2024 and was relaunched under an online and wholesale model in 2025 after failing to find a buyer for the chain and its now-estranged franchisees.

== History ==
Godfrey Cohen started the business in 1931 after buying 30 vacuum cleaners from auctions in the newspaper and putting them up for sale in his family's furniture store at a time when vacuum cleaners were typically only sold by door-to-door salesmen. It wasn't long before businessman John Johnston came across Godfrey Cohen's business, and the two quickly became business partners over a simple handshake, opening the first Godfreys store at the Prahran Market in Melbourne and forming a partnership that lasted for over 70 years. Over this period, the business rapidly expanded within Australia as demand from customers increased after World War II, and the product range grew from solely bagged vacuum cleaners to include steam mops, carpet shampooers, robotic vacuums, handstick vacuums, wet & dry vacuums, handheld vacuums, hard floor cleaners, garment steamers, backpack vacuums, floor polishers, carpet blowers, bagless vacuums, cleaning consumables and more including a range of anti-allergy, asthma and pet hair vacuum cleaners recognised by the National Asthma Council Australia as Sensitive Choice approved.

Godfrey Cohen died in 2004, and Godfreys was sold to private equity companies Pacific Equity Partners and CCMP Capital Asia for $350 million in 2006. The company was relisted on the Australian Securities Exchange (ASX) in 2014, but it was subsequently delisted from the ASX in July 2018 after Cohen's original business partner John Johnston, whose family remained involved with the business by owning 28% of the shares in the company, proposed a private takeover. Johnston died soon after the successful takeover.

=== Closure ===
On 30 January 2024 Godfreys was placed into voluntary administration, appointing PwC as administrators after being "hit by conditions beyond our control, including the weakness in discretionary spending by consumers, which has had an ongoing and significant impact on sales". Before being placed into voluntary administration, Godfreys consisted of a combination of 141 company and franchise stores in Australia and New Zealand. Together with their retail stores, Godfreys also operates multiple service and repair centres across the two countries.

After slimming down the chain in an attempt to resurrect it for sale, Godfreys Group announced on 20 March 2024 that it will commence "a progressive wind-down of operations" in Australia and New Zealand after administrators were unable to find a new buyer. In a statement, administrators said that "after conducting a comprehensive process to identify a purchaser for the business" there were "no viable offers to take the business forward". Stores were progressively closed until 31 May, and franchised stores were able to operate until 31 March.

Surviving franchised stores began changing their name soon after. Some stores in SA, WA, VIC, NSW and QLD reopened under the new name of “About Clean”.

=== Relaunch ===
In June 2024, the brands and assets of Godfreys were acquired by Future Innovation Holdings. Godfreys was relaunched in January 2025 as an online and wholesale business.

== Brands ==
Godfreys held the licence to distribute Hoover-branded vacuum cleaners in Australia and New Zealand. In addition to the Hoover brand, Godfreys also owns the exclusive distribution rights to Wertheim, Vorwerk floorcare range, Pullman, and Sauber cleaning products.

Godfreys also supplied Nilfisk, Vax, Miele, Electrolux, Bissell, Black & Decker, Numatic and more cleaning machines for the domestic and commercial cleaning market.

== Advertising ==
Godfreys obtained greater brand awareness in Australia and New Zealand during the 1990s through many years of similar television advertisements featuring then-chief executive John Hardy, one which famously saw Hardy demonstrate the suction power of a vacuum by picking up a bowling ball.

== Awards ==
The company has won the following awards:

- Power Retail's Top 100 Online Retailers of 2020, at rank 65.
