= Stuart & Sons =

Australian piano manufacturer

- Type: Private company
- Industry: Musical instruments
- Founded: 1990
- Founder: Wayne Stuart
- Headquarters: Tumut, New South Wales, Australia
- Area served: Worldwide
- Products: Grand pianos
- Website: stuartandsons.com

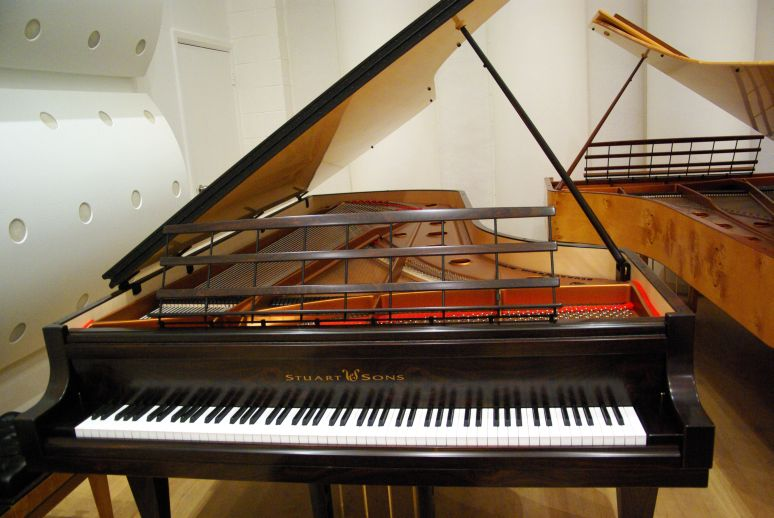
Stuart & Sons 2.9-metre (9.5 ft) 102-note piano

Stuart & Sons is an Australian manufacturer of handcrafted grand pianos. The company is based in Tumut in New South Wales.

== History ==
Wayne Stuart founded the company in 1990. From 2001 the company traded as Piano Australia Pty Limited, a partnership with Albert Music, under which more than 50 large grand pianos were built; in 2014 the partnership ended and the business became fully family owned.

The company used to be based in Newcastle but in 2015, it relocated to Tumut at the base of the Snowy Mountains.

== Pianos ==
Stuart & Sons uses Australian timbers for construction, including Tasmanian huon pine for the 108-key piano built for Beleura House on the Mornington Peninsula.

The Dutch-Australian pianist and teacher Gerard Willems used a Stuart & Sons piano when recording the complete piano sonata cycle of Ludwig van Beethoven during 1999 and 2000.

Stuart & Sons created a grand piano with 14 more keys than are found on a standard piano, for a total of 102 keys (C0 to F8) or eight and one half octaves. A model with 20 extra keys (108 keys in total, 9 octaves, C0 to B8, approximately 16.4 Hz to 7902.1 Hz) was built in 2018. A model with 112 keys was built between 2022 and 2024 and delivered to Rockford, USA in October 2024.

== Piano locations ==
Stuart pianos are used at many locations throughout Australia, including:

- Sydney Conservatorium of Music
- Government House, Sydney
- Admiralty House, Sydney
- Powerhouse Museum Sydney
- Tasmanian Conservatorium of Music
- Australian Elizabethan Theatre Trust
- Clancy Auditorium Central Queensland University
- Central Queensland Conservatorium of Music, Mackay, Queensland
- Beleura House and Gardens, Mornington, Victoria
- Hale School, Perth

== See also ==
Other Australian piano manufacturers

Formerly:

- Beale Piano, now manufactured in China.
- Wertheim Piano

Other notable pianos of comparable size

- Imperial Bösendorfer (C0 to C8, 97 keys)
- opus 102 (102 keys) by Stephen Paulello
