= Wertheim (company) =

- Company type: Brand
- Industry: Vacuum Cleaners
- Genre: Floor Care
- Products: Vacuums, Deep Cleaners, Steam Mops, Carpet Shampooers

Wertheim is a brand of domestic vacuum cleaners and floor care products.

The Wertheim brand name used to be sold in Australia and New Zealand through Godfreys but Godfreys went out of business in 2024.

== History ==
The Wertheim brand was established in Australia in the 1870s when German Hugo Wertheim (1854 - 1919) moved to Melbourne and established a business as agent for his father's cousin Joseph Wertheim, a well-established manufacturer of sewing machines back in Germany. Hugo Wertheim sold sewing machines, bicycles, pianos and other mechanical devices, under brands such as Wertheim, Electra, Planet, Griffin and Hapsburg.

In 1908 Wertheim diversified into manufacturing and opened a large piano factory at Richmond, Melbourne. The brand achieved considerable success selling sewing machines, pianos and other electrical goods constructed of mainly Australian materials.

The Australian Wertheim factory was closed in 1935 and was later turned into a Heinz factory and later re-purposed as a television studio for GTV Channel 9. Shortly after, the brand was acquired by Australian retail company Godfreys.

== See also ==
- Wertheim Piano
