= Pearl River Piano Group =

Largest Chinese piano manufacturer

Company logo

The Pearl River Piano Group (广州珠江钢琴集团有限公司) is China's largest piano manufacturer and has the largest piano factory in the world producing more pianos than any other factory. The company was established in 1956 in Guangzhou, Guangdong, China. Pearl River is capable of producing over 100,000 pianos a year, and exports them to more than 80 countries. Today Pearl River pianos are manufactured under a wide range of brands and levels. Each of these series have similar sizes with different scale designs, materials and different sound. The Hallet & Davis line produced by Pearl River is the oldest United States piano name still in production.

Also in January 2016, the company took over 90% of the shares of Wilhelm Schimmel, a German piano manufacturer in Braunschweig. After getting control of the Schimmel's factory in Braunschweig, Pearl River Piano Group Europe GMBH also removed Ritmuller production to this factory.

Operations in Germany remain unchanged and the Schimmel factory is still managed by the Schimmel family.

== Certifications ==
In 1998, Pearl River became the first piano company in China to receive International Standards Association ISO 9001 Certification (ISO 9001) for its complete line of grand and vertical pianos, including all parts and components. ISO 9001 Certification is awarded by an independent auditing organization, following a lengthy audit of quality systems, ranging from the procurement of raw materials to manufacturing systems, assembly procedures, and customer service. Pearl River also recently was awarded ISO 14001, which is similar, but relates to environmental standards. Pearl River is the first manufacturer in China to receive this award.

== The Pearl River name ==
Pearl River ran a company-owned US distribution until 2000, when they turned the distribution over to North American Music. Pearl River was one of the first Chinese piano companies to market pianos in the United States under its own company name.

== Other instruments ==
Pearl River is also one of the world's largest guitar and violin manufacturers, and is a primary supplier for the popular "First Act" brand of guitars commonly found at Target stores among others. The company also sells drums, brass, and woodwind instruments internationally. In the People's Republic of China, they produce guitars with the own brand name, "Kapok Guitar" (红棉).

=== Ritmuller ===
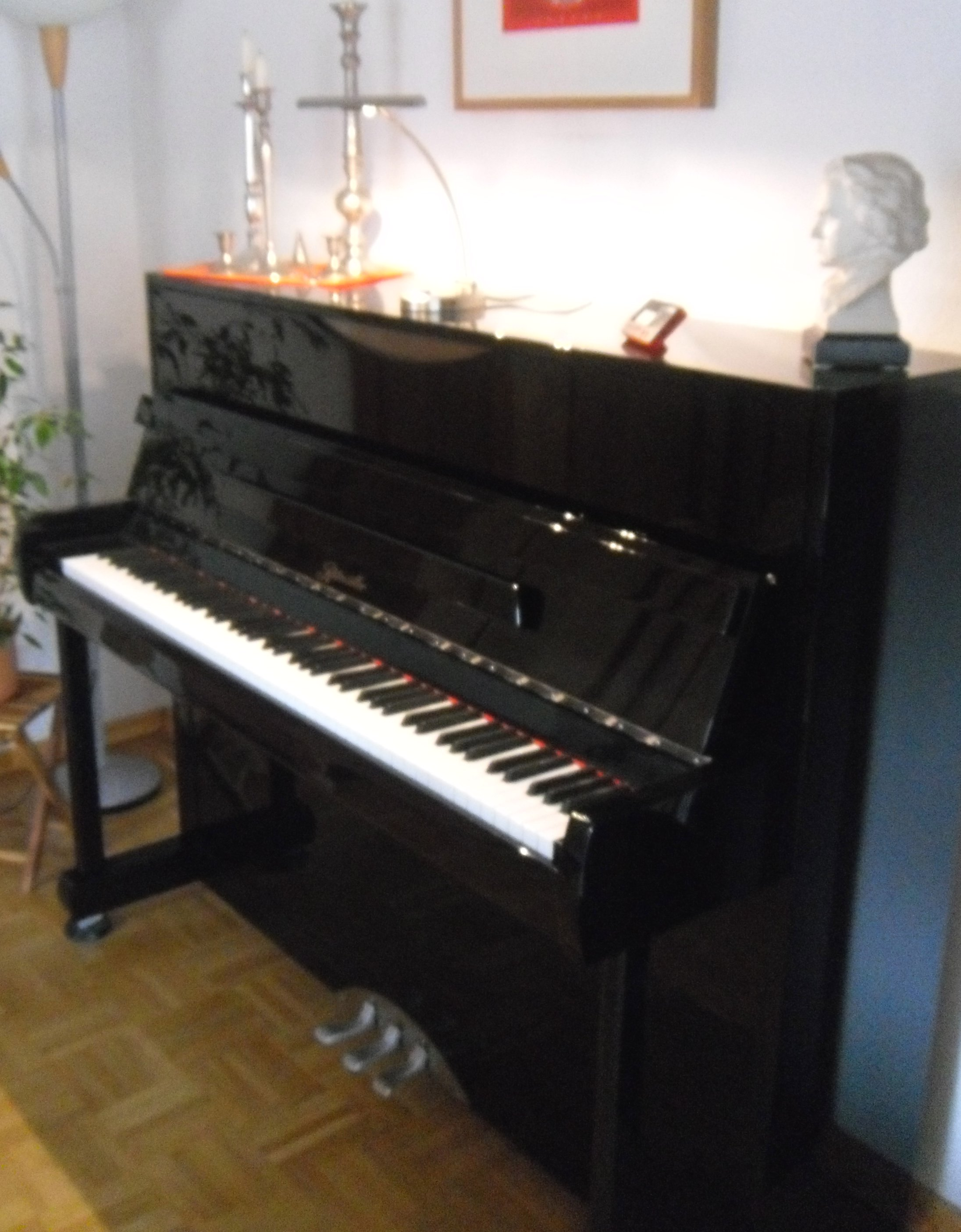
Ritmüller piano made by Pearl River Piano

In 1795 Gottlieb Wilhelm Ritmüller began one of the first piano factories in Germany, soon gaining favor with 19th-century composers, including Johannes Brahms. Pearl River acquired the Ritmüller brand and its scale designs in 1999. Stephan Mohler Stephan Mohler, former Chief of Production for C. Bechstein pianos of Berlin, and a team of piano designers were tasked to create handcrafted pianos worthy of the Ritmüller name by combining high-end European components with advanced CNC technologies and processes. Ritmüller Superior and Premium pianos are offered in vertical and grand models, and the flagship Supreme RS280 9' 2" Concert Grand piano. A Prodigy Player Piano system may be added to any grand piano.
