= 80000 Shots =

2002 film

- Directed by: Manfred Walther
- Written by: Manfred Walther
- Produced by: Manfred Walther; Thomas Erbach
- Cinematography: Manfred Walther
- Music by: Andreas Czeschka
- Release date: February 2002 (Berlin Film Festival)
- Running time: 53 minutes
- Country: Germany
- Language: German

80000 Shots is a German film directed by Manfred Walther. It was released in 2002 and had its premiere at the Berlin International Film Festival.

It is a documentary about the reconstruction of Berlin's Potsdamer Platz. The film runs for 55 minutes' and was shot in timelapse between 1990–2001.
