= Alsterhaus =

Department store in Hamburg, Germany

Coordinates: 53.5531°N 9.9918°E

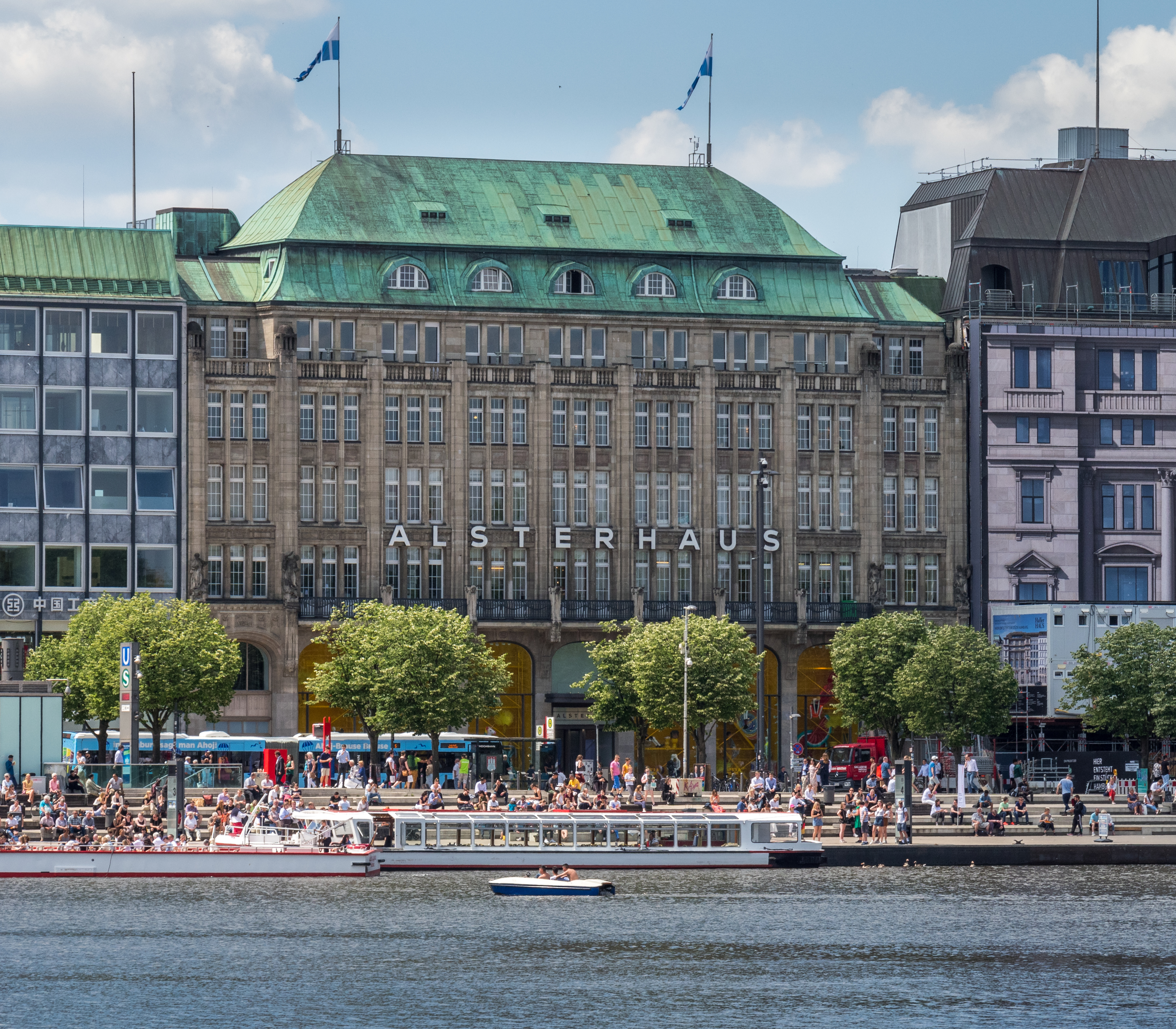
- Main façade of the Alsterhaus
- Industry: Retail
- Genre: Department store
- Founded: 1912; 114 years ago
- Owner: Central Group
- Parent: KaDeWe Group
- Website: alsterhaus.de

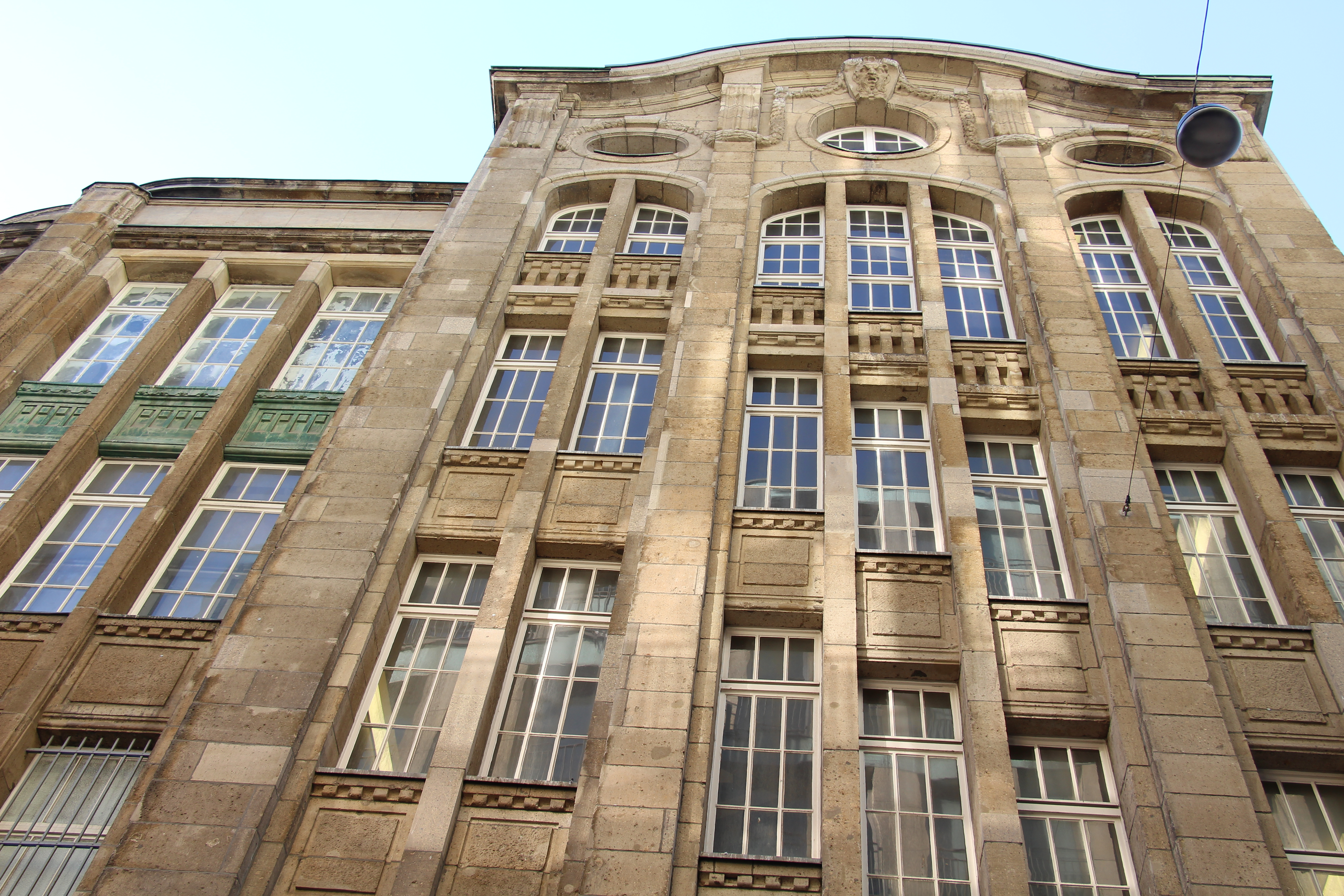
Closeup of façade

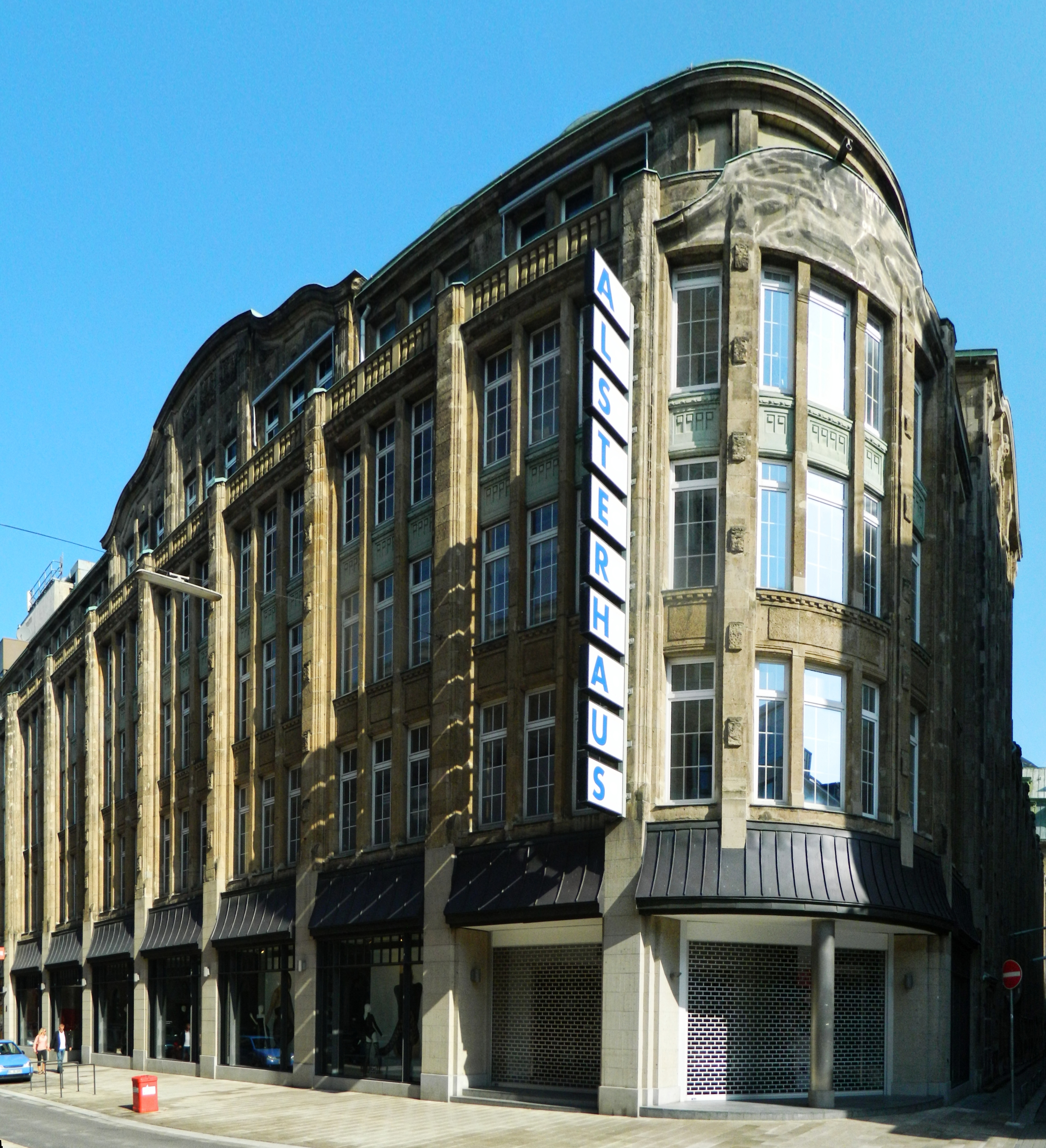

The Alsterhaus is a five-story department store at Jungfernstieg 16–20 in Hamburg that opened in 1912.

From 1994 to 2014 it was a branch of the department store group Karstadt (as part of Karstadt Premium GmbH), after which it was made a part of KaDeWe Group GmbH together with Oberpollinger in Munich and KaDeWe in Berlin. The department store has a sales area of around 24,000 m^{2} (260,000 sq ft) and specializes in items such as perfume, accessories, clothing and delicatessen. On the fourth floor there is a Le-Buffet restaurant with a view of the Binnenalster.

It is open Monday to Saturday from 10 A.M. to 8 P.M. The Alsterhaus also has its own parking garage, which can be reached via Poststraße and Bei der Stadtwassermühle street.

== History ==
The Gera merchant Oscar Tietz opened the first branch of his department store Hermann Tietz (Hertie) in Hamburg on March 1, 1897, on Großer Burstah with a wide range of products on textiles, food, furniture, carpets and books. He acquired a 5200 square meter area on Jungfernstieg, which had developed into the first address in Hamburg. On the area where Scholviens Passage, the Hotel zum Kronprinzen and other houses were located, he built a new branch of his "Hermann Tietz department store", which opened on April 24, 1912. The construction costs for the department store with an upscale range and furnishings such as marble and crystal chandeliers amounted to 4½ million gold reichsmarks. The plans were drawn up by the architectural firm Cremer & Wolffenstein, and Richard Jacobssen from Hamburg was in charge of construction. The property was previously secured with 5,000 oak posts that were driven into the soft earth on the banks of the Alster.

=== The time of National Socialism ===
In the economic crisis after 1929, sales at Tietz department stores fell by up to 46%. The Aryanization of the department store was preceded by a liquidity bottleneck, which resulted in the refusal of a credit line that had already been promised in 1933. In March 1933, the managing directors, the brothers Georg and Martin Tietz, as well as their brother-in-law Hugo Zwillenberg, were presented with a debt relief plan, which ultimately led to the sale of the Tietz family's shares to Commerzbank, Deutsche and Dresdner Bank without direct government intervention ("cold Aryanization") led. On July 24, 1933 the creditor banks founded the Hertie Kaufhaus-Beteiligungs-Gesellschaft m.b.H. (short : Hertie GmbH). On July 29, 1933, the banking consortium forced the immediate resignation of Hugo Zwillenberg from management and ownership with a formal inheritance law settlement agreement. Instead, the banks appointed the textile department manager of Hermann Tietz OHG, Georg Karg, as a representative of Hertie GmbH with a 50,000 Reichsmark deposit as one of the managing director and shareholder of the department store group. Hertie GmbH came into being without any capital contribution of its own, but had a majority of votes among the shareholders. The Jewish Shareholders had to hand over their shares to Hertie GmbH and were reimbursed an amount of 1½ million Reichsmarks for their severely undervalued company assets of 21½ million Reichsmarks. The von Eglau, Neumann and from Munzinger Archive circulated "AbfiHowever, the "foundation of twelve million marks" cannot be proven.

Two Aryan managers were appointed for the department stores. One of the two managing directors was Georg Karg, who had previously been in charge of textile purchasing for the Tietz houses.

He acquired the shares from the banks in two installments during the war. The Hermann Tietz department store on Jungfernstieg was then given its current name Alsterhaus in 1935. (For more information see: Expropriation of Tietz.)

Historians have found evidence that in 1943 and 1944 the Alsterhaus sold textiles that had been produced in the Łódź Ghetto.

In 1949, the Tietz family tried to get their assets back and finally agreed to compensation in a settlement with the Hertie company by transferring ownership of the branches in Munich, Stuttgart and Karlsruhe. At this point in time, the Hertie Group still consisted of ten branches.

=== Development after the war ===
From 1948 to 1961, the Alsterhaus was the headquarters for the department store group Hertie, which was solely owned by the Karg family.

The Alsterhaus suffered only minor damage during the war and continued to be run as a full-range department store. Great importance was placed on a solid range of high quality.

At the end of the 1960s, Hertie acquired the property Große Bleichen at the corner of Poststrasse, on which the Dyckhoff textile house store was located. A modern extension was built here with an additional entrance to the Alsterhaus.

In 1983, the Alsterhaus was completely renovated, lasting ten months and costing 50 million German marks.

In 1988, the music store WOM (World of Music) moved into a sales area in the basement of the Alsterhaus. The branch was closed again in April 2004 during the renovation of the Alsterhaus after Karstadt divested itself of its stake in the company.

=== Takeover by Karstadt ===
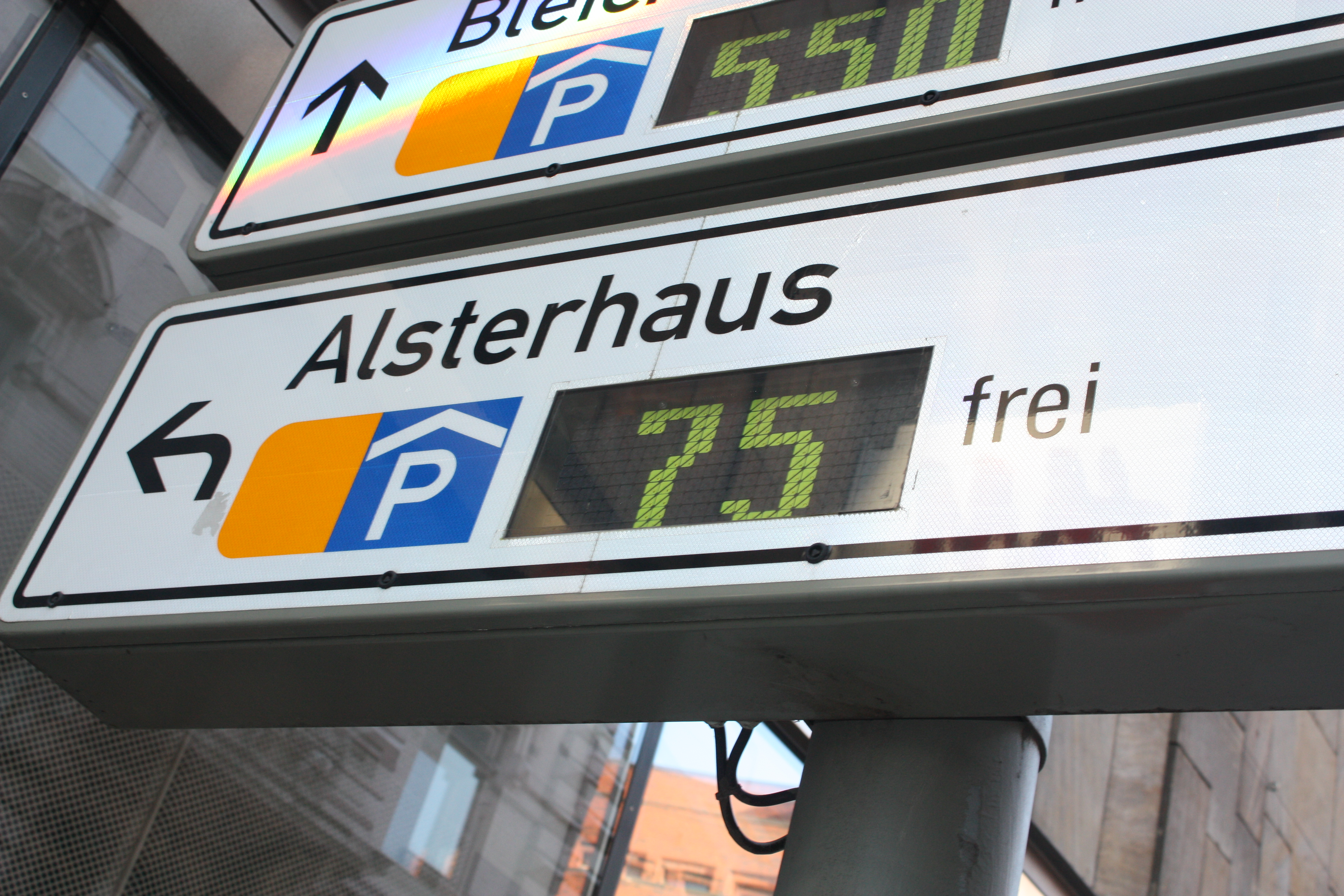
Access to the Alsterhaus car park (parking management signage)

In 1994, parts of the Hertie department stores, including the Alsterhaus, were taken over by Karstadt. In the consolidated balance sheet of Arcandor it was last reported (2008) under the Karstadt Premium Group without mentioning detailed figures.

However, the owner of the Alsterhaus property remains the non-profit Hertie-Stiftung (foundation), Karstadt cannot therefore be independent decide on structural changes to the house.

The takeover resulted in strong influences on purchasing policy, which had previously been largely independently controlled by the company. These affected the range of goods. A little later, the premium product segment was partially abandoned and lower-priced items were added to the range, which was met with little customer acceptance.

A further step in the attempt to improve the profitability of the house was to reduce the product groups in the range. The areas of toys, books, electrical appliances, consumer electronics, carpets, furniture and household goods were completely abandoned.

Between 2003 and 2005, the Alsterhaus was completely rebuilt for around 35 million euros. The Hamburg architect Christian F. Heine was responsible for the plans. The facade on Jungfernstieg and on Poststrasse at the back was rebuilt and brought closer to the original designs. The interior was completely renovated and modernized. The large light shaft over all floors with the glass dome from the original building was not restored; instead there are now small atriums over two floors each and a small oval light shaft on all floors, high shop windows on Jungfernstieg that reach to the ground, and glass elevators are the most striking innovations. The new window front on the Alster with 7½ m high new windows is one of the highest in Germany. Above the atriums there is a restaurant on the fourth floor, the ceiling of which was designed by Professor Dirk J. Breuer which also influenced the rest of the equipment during the renovation.

With the renovation, a strategy of a premium range with higher quality products in the smaller sales area was aimed for and consistently pursued. The depth of the product range will be reduced in individual remaining areas. The grocery department was significantly reduced and taken over exclusively by shop-in-shop suppliers, the size of the haberdashery and fabric department for which the Alsterhaus was famous was significantly reduced.

A number of external companies received their own sales areas as part of the shop-in-shop system.

The part of the building on the corner of Poststrasse and Große Bleichen was spun off in 2003 and is now a branch of Hennes & Mauritz (H&M) with access to the Alsterhaus on all floors.

After the takeover by Signa Holding from the Austrian entrepreneur René Benko, the houses of Karstadt Premium GmbH were renamed The KaDeWe Group in order to distinguish them from the rest, to separate Karstadt department stores, and to emphasize their affiliation with KaDeWe. In June 2015, Signa sold the majority stake (50.1%) to the Italian department store chain La Rinascente, which in turn is part of the Thai Central Group.

Central Group took over 100% of the KaDeWe Group that Alsterhaus is part of in 2024.
