= World of Music =

World of Music may refer to:

== Film, TV and radio ==
- World of Music (TV series), a 1968 CBC classical music series
- A World of Music (TV series), a 1966 Canadian musical television series
- The World of Music, a Canadian variety television series on CBC Television from 1960 to 1961
- "A World of Music", a 1992 episode of Barney & Friends

== Music ==
- World of Music (program), a 1971 televised Thai music program
- World of Music, magazine edited by Isaac B. Woodbury
- World of Music (Zeebra album)
- World of Music (Mary O'Hara album), 1989
- A World of Music, compilation album A. R. Rahman

== Other ==
- The World of Music (journal), an academic journal published by the Department of Musicology at the University of Göttingen
- World of Music (retailer)

== See also ==
- Wide World of Music, retail chain run by ABC Retail Records, unit of American Broadcasting Companies
- World of Music, Arts and Dance (WOMAD)
- World Music (disambiguation)
