= Sylvie di Giusto =

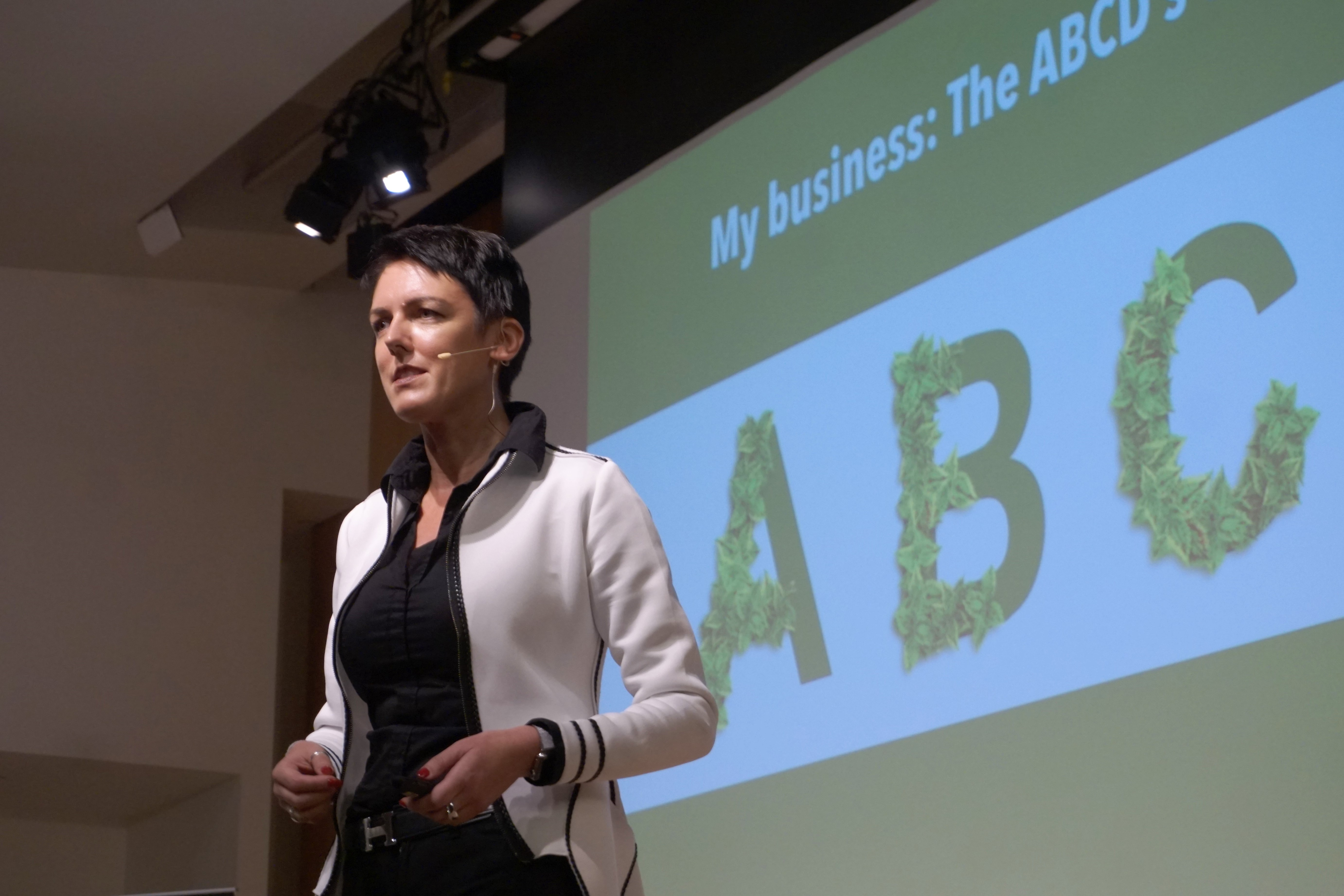
- Sylvie di Giusto speaking at the Smart Hustle Conference
- Occupations: Professional speaker, consultant, author
- Known for: Executive Branding & Image, "People Packaging"

Sylvie di Giusto is a New York-based Austrian professional speaker, consultant and author.

== Early life ==
Di Giusto was born in Austria and grew up in a multicultural family (French, Italian, Austrian). She now lives in New York City with her two children and her husband.

She graduated from Paedagogische Hochschule Wien (Vienna, Austria) and subsequently started a career as a teacher for Communications and Information Technology. She spent the first years of her career teaching young students and adults at Bundeshandelsakademie Wien 10 and Bundeshandelsakademie Wien 13.

== Career ==
As a trainer and consultant, Sylvie di Giusto has worked for companies like BMW, BASF, Henkel, and McKinsey. She has been one of the first German e-Learning pioneers developing e-Learning programs and learning management systems, offering corporate clients the chance to implement online learning into their training and development curriculum. She joined Karstadt Warenhaus AG in 2001 (training and development for retail company) and quickly took over a group-wide responsibility at Karstadt Quelle New Media where she developed hybrid learning solutions for the entire KarstadtQuelle group.

Di Giusto joined the Management Consulting Team at Karstadt Quelle AG (later Arcandor AG) to build and lead the Arcandor Academy, an innovative Management Academy for the Top Leaders and Global Talents. Her management development programs were offered to more than 100,000 employees including those of retail company Karstadt Warenhaus AG (based in Essen), its flag store KaDeWe (based in Berlin), Alsterhaus (based in Hamburg) Thomas Cook (Tourism company, based in Peterborough, UK), Quelle AG (based in Nuernberg), Neckermann AG (based in Frankfurt) and several small mail order companies around the world.

In 2011, she moved to the United States and became a corporate Image Consultant, specializing in Personal Branding and focusing on corporations, professionals and politicians.

Today she is a professional Keynote Speaker and speaks about the power and impact of first impressions of employees and leaders in organizations, their impact on the customer's decision-making process and the company's reputation. In her keynotes she reveals the components of a professional and personal brand, which she describes as the sum total of appearance, behavior, communication and digital footprint. She has spoken for companies such as American Airlines, American Express, Bloomberg, Exelon, Fashion Institute of Technology, Grant Thornton, Nespresso, Nickelodeon, Manulife, Merial, Prudential, Waldorf Astoria, and Harvard Business Club, Hofstra University, Pand enn University.

Currently, she is the President (Owner) of Executive Image Consulting LLC based in New York City, and Co-Owner of Studio for Image Professionals where she teaches and certifies Students who want to start and pursue a career as an Image Consultant.

She is the author of "The Image of Leadership: How Leaders Package Themselves to Stand Out for the Right Reasons," which is part of the C-Suite Book Club, a part of The C-Suite Network.

== Publications ==
Books authored by Sylvie di Giusto:

- The Image of Leadership, How Leaders package themselves to stand out for the right reasons

== Media ==
- CNBC Article - 3 Things you can Learn from Mark Zuckerberg and Bill Gates About Making a Good First Impression
- CNBC Article - How to Impress Your Boss in 7 Seconds
- CNN Money Article - How a woman's appearance affects her career
- Business Insider Germany Feature
- C-Suite TV Best Seller TV Interview
- The Steve Show with Steven Napolitan Interview
