= Edith Hirsch (economist) =

German economist

Edith Jarislowsky Hirsch
- Born: 2 November 1899; Berlin, Germany
- Died: 7 January 2003 (aged 103); Georgetown University Hospital in Washington, D.C., United States
- Spouse: Julius Hirsch

Academic background
- Education: University of Heidelberg

Academic work
- Discipline: Commodities economics

Edith Jarislowsky Hirsch (2 November 1899 – 7 January 2003) was a commodities economist who worked as a consultant with her husband, Julius Hirsch, and published several papers after his death. She also taught at the New School for Social Research.

== Biography ==
Edith Hirsch was born in Berlin, Germany to Adolph and Flora Jarislowsky. She was the third of five siblings. Hirsch received a bachelor's degree from the University of Heidelberg in 1925. She met Julius Hirsch at the childhood home of Albert Einstein's wife, who was a good friend of her mother. They married in 1927 and their only child was born in 1928. In 1933, they emigrated to Copenhagen, and in 1941 they moved to the United States. Hirsch earned a master's degree in social science in 1943 at the New School for Social Research in New York. She and her husband taught at the school throughout the 1940s and 50s. She worked as a consultant for many companies with her husband. In 1961, Julius Hirsch died and Edith closed their consulting firm, although she continued publishing papers. She continued working into her later years. She moved to Washington in 1989 and died on January 7, 2003.

== Published work ==
In the late 1940s and early 1950s, the Hirsches made several economic forecasts for the United States Department of Agriculture and for newspapers. Edith sometimes had to publish under Julius's name. These predictions involved fiscal expenditure forecasts, food price forecasts and surplus and deficiency forecasts. In 1965, Hirsch helped George Tietz edit his family's memoirs of owning the Hermann Tietz supermarket chain. After her husband's death, Edith continued working, publishing many works including Food Supplies in the Aftermath of World War II in 1993
