= Hans-Georg Karg =

Hans-Georg Karg (born August 29, 1921 in Berlin; died June 25, 2003 in Ruhpolding) was a German businessman and owner of Hertie Waren- und Kaufhaus GmbH. Together with his wife Adelheid Karg (1921-2004), he founded the charitable Karg Foundation (Frankfurt am Main).

== Early years ==
His father Georg Karg (1888-1972) was a buyer at Hermann Tietz Warenhäuser. In 1933, he joined the management of the department store group. The Tietz family, which was Jewish, was forced to sell their shares as part of the Aryanization process imposed by the Nazis. Georg Karg acquired the Hertie company from Dresdner Bank by 1942.

Hans-Georg Karg was born into a well-off middle-class family in Berlin-Charlottenburg. After finishing school, he completed a commercial apprenticeship at the Paul Reetz textile company in Liegnitz, Lower Silesia, from 1938 to 1941. He spent the years 1943 and 1944 and the end of the war as a soldier in Italy.

== Reconstruction ==
After the war, Georg and Hans-Georg Karg rebuilt the Hertie company. Most of the Hertie department stores were located in East Germany and were expropriated; those in West Germany were destroyed or only functioned to a limited extent.

In 1947, in response to a claim for restitution from the Tietz family, a settlement agreement was reached with the Tietz family. The Hertie chain developed into one of the largest department store groups in West Germany, with a total of 25 department stores in the Federal Republic by 1955. In 1953, Hans-Georg Karg joined the management of Hertie Waren- und Kaufhaus GmbH, and in 1961 he became Managing Director of the entire Hertie Group, which, after stops in Hamburg and Berlin, finally moved to the centrally located Frankfurt am Main. In 1972, after the death of his father, Hans-Georg Karg succeeded his father in all leading positions.

Hans-Georg Karg's first wife Martha died in a car accident in 1949 at the age of just 25. On March 12, 1952, Hans-Georg Karg married Adelheid Sulovsky (1921-2004). The marriage remained childless.

The crisis in department stores prompted Hans-Georg Karg to sell the whole of Hertie to its competitor Karstadt in 1993. At the time, it was a group with 100 department stores, 36,000 employees and annual sales of DM 5 billion. Most of the proceeds went to the non-profit Hertie Foundation in Frankfurt am Main.

== Later life and death ==
From then on, Hans-Georg lived in seclusion with his wife in Bad Homburg, but mainly at Gut Sossau near Grabenstätt in Chiemgau. There he pursued his passion as a farmer. He also amassed an important collection of Max Liebermann's works. From 1989, Mr. and Mrs. Karg dedicated themselves to establishing the charitable Karg Foundation for the gifted, to which Hans-Georg Karg bequeathed his entire private fortune upon his death. In 2003, the businessman and benefactor Hans-Georg Karg died, marked by many years of serious illness. Adelheid Karg died in 2004.
