= Primondo =

- Company type: trading companies
- Industry: mail order
- Founded: 1 March 2007
- Headquarters: Essen, Nordrhein-Westfalen, Germany
- Key people: Marc Oliver Sommer, CEO
- Revenue: 4,3 billion € (in 2007)
- Number of employees: 23,000
- Website: www.primondo.com

Primondo is the holding company for all mail order brands of Arcandor AG.

The mail order line of Arcandor AG (previously KarstadtQuelle AG) has been called “Primondo” since 1 March 2007. Primondo itself is a holding company, which does not appear as a brand for the end customer. Primondo is rather a house of brands in the universal and specialist mail order business. Well-known examples are Quelle, Hess Natur, Bogner Homeshopping or Baby Walz. Since June 2007, the teleshopping channel HSE24 has also been part of the Primondo Group. More than 23,000 employees work for Primondo in 23 different countries. On June 9, 2009 the company filed for bankruptcy.

== Business units ==
Mail retailer: Quelle is the mail order company famous far beyond the German border for universal mail order business services. In 2006, Quelle and its 14 foreign subsidiaries, the division Foto Quelle, Profectis and SB-Großhandel (self-service wholesale) generated an annual turnover of € 2.5 billion. A total of 8,000 employees currently work in this division.

Specialty mail order: A total of 17 brands can be found under the umbrella of Primondo in the specialist mail order business and are represented by 4,100 employees in 12 different countries. The annual total turnover for this field was € 998.2 million in 2006.

Teleshopping: HSE24 comes second in the German teleshopping market following QVC with its approximately 1.3 million customers, a range of 39 million households in Germany, Austria and Switzerland and an annual turnover of 286 million in 2006. 460 employees currently work for HSE 24.

Service Group: The Service Group encompasses the essential units of a mail order company, e.g., customer centres, logistics, financial services and IT. A total of approximately 10,000 employees currently for the Service Group.

== Mail order brands ==
Primondo regards itself a house of brands. The following brands form part of this house (alphabetic order):

- Atelier Goldner Schnitt
- Baby Walz
- Bogner Homeshopping
- Bon’A Parte
- Creawalz
- Die moderne Hausfrau
- Elégance
- Emilia Lay
- Hess Natur
- HSE 24
- Madeleine
- Mirabeau
- myby
- Peter Hahn
- Planet Sports
- Quelle GmbH (with Foto Quelle and Küchen Quelle)
- Sunny Walz
- Vertbaudet Germany
- Walz Kidzz

== Global competitors ==
- Amazon.com
- eBay
- Otto GmbH
- Redcats (PPR)

== Sources ==
- Information about the company on the Corporate Website of Primondo
- Information about Primondo on the Corporate Website of Arcandor
