= The World of Music =

- Genre: variety
- Presented by: Wally Koster
- Country of origin: Canada
- Original language: English
- No. of seasons: 1
- No. of episodes: 32

Original release
- Network: CBC Television
- Release: 2 October 1960 – 2 July 1961

The World of Music is a Canadian variety show that aired on CBC Television from 1960 to 1961.

== Premise ==
Each episode of this program covered a particular genre, nationality or region. Themes included multicultural music, opera, current songs and dance tunes. Wally Koster hosted A World of Music and introduced visiting artists such as Ernestine Anderson, Dorothy Collins, Alan and Blanche Lund, Lister Sinclair, Joyce Sullivan, The Journeymen and The Travellers.

This program is distinct from CBC's 1966 production A World of Music.

== Scheduling ==
This half-hour program was broadcast Sundays at 7:30 p.m. (Eastern) from 2 October 1960 to 2 July 1961.
