= World Music (disambiguation) =

World music is an English phrase for styles of music from non-Western countries.

World Music may refer to:

- "World music" (term), credited to ethnomusicologist Robert E. Brown
- World Music (Goat album), 2012
- World Music (Taj Mahal album), 1993

== See also ==
- World of Music (disambiguation)
- Fête de la Musique, or World Music Day, on June 21 every year
- Awards for world music
- Putumayo World Music, an American record label
