= World of Music (retailer) =

WOM (World of Music) is a brand and sales channel of the e-commerce and mail order media company jpc which in the past was a chain of retail music stores across Germany.

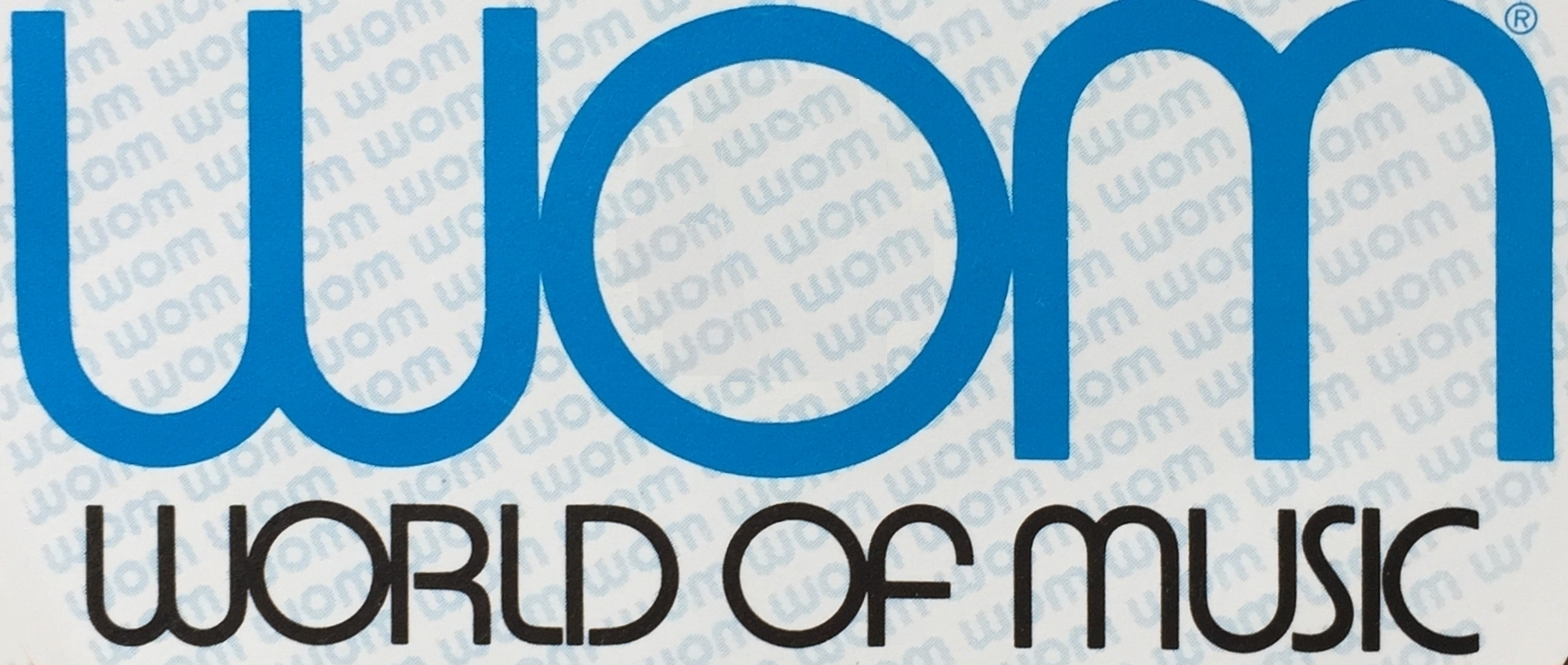
Company logo

== History ==
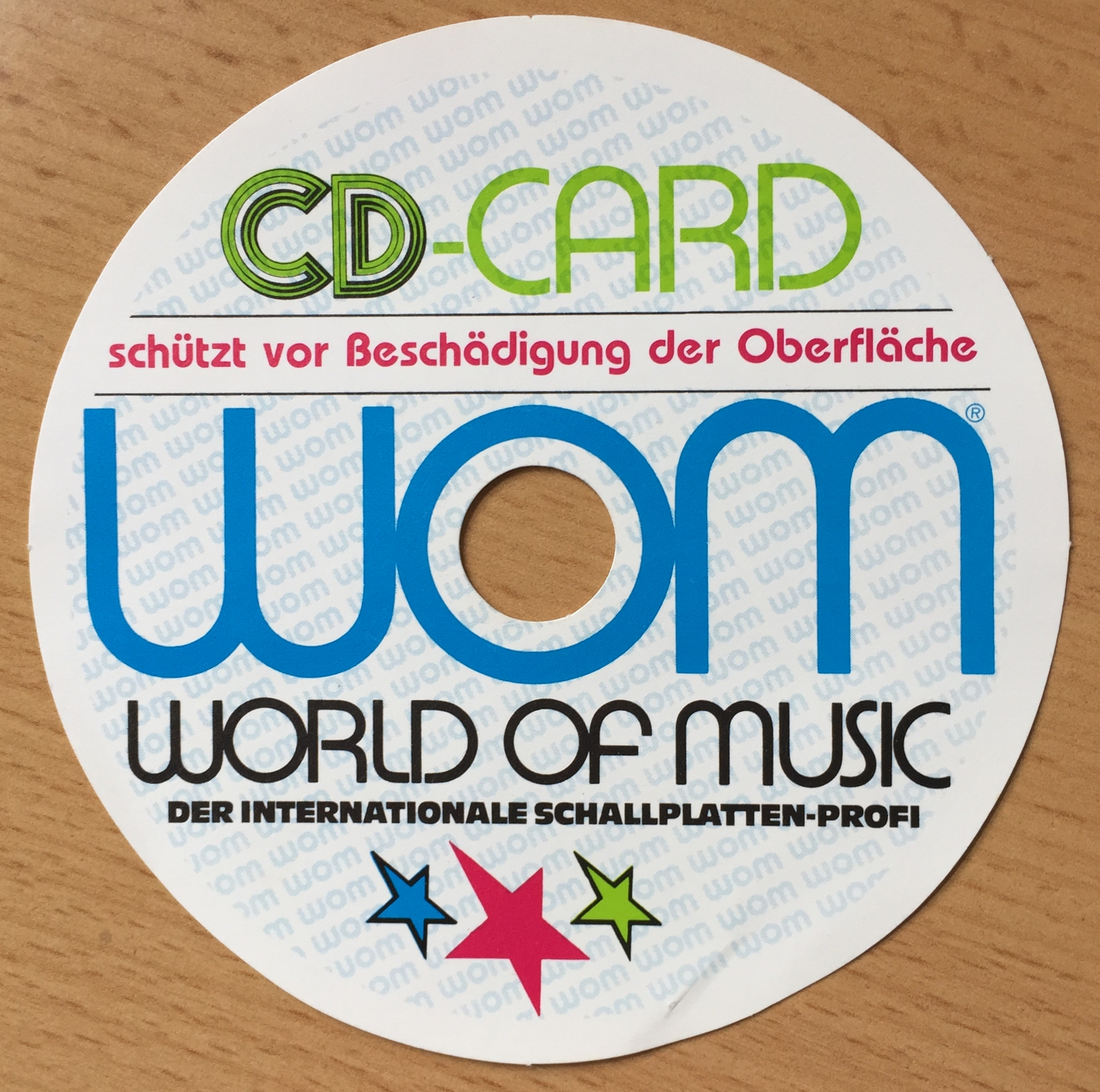
Paper insert to protect CDs from theft in stores (1980s)

WOM was founded in Kiel in 1982 as a retail company for the sale of recorded music and opened branches in seven locations in Germany over the next few years. In 1987, Hertie Waren- und Kaufhaus GmbH took over 50% of the shares and used the WOM brand for the music departments of its department stores (including in the Alsterhaus in Hamburg, Frankfurt am Main, Karlsruhe and Cologne). In 1994, Hertie was taken over by Karstadt and the WOM brand was removed from department stores over the next few years and their music departments were closed.

In 2002, the headquarters of WOM World of Music Production and Publishing GmbH was relocated from Kiel to Essen and a profit transfer agreement was concluded with Karstadt.

In May 2009, the mail order company jpc acquired the WOM brand and continues to use it for a legally dependent sales line in online trading.

WOM World of Music Production and Publishing GmbH itself remained with Karstadt Warenhaus GmbH and was dissolved after its bankruptcy in 2010.

=== Music magazine ===
From 1985 onwards, the editorially managed WOM Journal was published monthly, which was available free of charge in WOM branches and was called itself “Germany's most widely read music magazine”. Starting with issue no. 234 (February 2004) the magazine was renamed WOM Magazine. From February 2002, the magazine could also be subscribed to for two euros per month. The magazine was discontinued after issue no. 288 (December 2008).
