= KaDeWe Group =

German department store group

KaDeWe Group GmbH is a group of three department stores in Germany with around 4,000 employees. It is owned by the Thai Central Group.

== Stores ==
=== Operating ===
- Kaufhaus des Westens in Berlin
- Oberpollinger in Munich
- Alsterhaus in Hamburg

=== Future ===
- Carsch Haus in Düsseldorf

=== Cancelled ===
- Lamarr in Vienna, Austria: Planned to open in 2025, cancelled in 2024 due to the Signa Holding bankruptcy and the under-construction store building was demolished.

== History ==
The group was founded in 2014 by Signa Holding (at the time owner of German department store Galeria Kaufhof) and was also owned by Beny Steinmetz for a short period. In 2015 Central Group (who own a plethora of department stores in Asia and Europe) acquired a stake in the company.

The construction of a new department store titled Lamarr (after actress Hedy Lamarr) was announced in 2022 to be built in Vienna.

In 2023, Signa Holding filed for bankruptcy and in mid-2024 Central Group purchased 100% of the company.

Following the cancellation of Lamarr, Central Group purchased the under-construction Düsseldorf Carsch-Haus store in 2025, saving the project.
