= Georg Karg =

German businessman

Georg Karg (August 2, 1888 - November 27, 1972 in Bad Homburg vor der Höhe) was a German businessman in the department store industry. After rising in the employ of the Hermann Tietz Department Stores, Karg took over the company when it was Aryanized, that is forcibly transferred to non-Jewish owners under the Nazis. After the Jewish owners were forced out, Karg was appointed managing director, running the stores under the name Hertie.

== Life ==
Born on August 2, 1888, in Friedeberg in der Neumark, Karg was the seventh child of ten siblings of the small cloth manufacturer and later textile retailer Karl Karg and his wife Luise. After an apprenticeship in the textile department store F. R. Knothe in the neighboring district town of Meseritz, Karg began working in 1908 as a simple textile salesman in a department store of Adolf Jandorf's Berlin department store chain. Thanks to his diligence and near-photographic memory, Jandorf promoted him to textile buyer after just one year. In 1913, Jandorf appointed him general manager of the second largest Jandorf department store on Wilmersdorfer Strasse with 600 employees.

After the sale of the Jandorf chain to the Hermann Tietz Group at the end of 1926, Karg became head of central textile purchasing at Hermann Tietz OHG. This made him "one of the best-paid department store managers in Germany" and in 1931 he could afford to turn down a lucrative offer from the Karstadt Group of 500,000 Reichsmarks in annual salary.

=== Nazi era ===
When the Nazis came to power in Germany in 1933, the Tietz family members and the Tietz group, which had been targeted even earlier, were persecuted under Nazi antisemitic racial laws. The Hermann Tietz Group was heavily indebted due to its expansion in the 1920s and the subsequent global economic crisis. However, massive payment difficulties were created only by the National Socialists’ “Jewish boycotts,” the flood of anti-Semitic hostility, and the politically induced department store crisis in the spring of 1933.

In June 1933, the department store group received a bridging loan from the Akzeptbank in the millions, but its approval depended on the firm's “Aryanization“ and Hitler's approval. A consortium of banks led by the Dresdner Bank, which was nationalized in 1931, and the Hardy & Co. Bank, which was closely associated with it, took advantage of the company's liquidity crisis in coordination with the Reich Ministry of Economics to gradually eliminate and replace the shareholders of Hermann Tietz General Partnership as part of the "Aryanization” process.

After Reich Economics Minister Kurt Schmitt convinced Hitler to stop nationalizing or closing down department stores, the banks in the creditor consortium founded the Hertie Kaufhaus-Beteiligungs-Gesellschaft m.b.H. (Hertie GmbH for short) on July 24, 1933. At the same time, Georg Karg was appointed managing director of Hertie GmbH together with the banks’ confidant, Trabart von der Tann.

On July 29, 1933, the bank consortium forced the immediate resignation of Hugo Zwillenberg as a personally liable partner by amending the articles of association of Hermann Tietz General Partnership, which the company owners had to sign. Zwillenberg was replaced by Hertie GmbH, and the company was now given the name Hermann Tietz & Co. After signing the amended partnership agreement, the company finally received a loan of 14.4 million Reichsmarks, of which the Akzeptbank contributed 5.7 million Reichsmarks and the consortium of creditor banks contributed 8.7 million Reichsmarks. As part of the forced conformity law, half of all the Jewish employees were laid off in August 1933. Some Jewish workers are said to have continued employment until 1938, as Karg held on to them due to a lack of workforce replacements.

By means of a settlement agreement dated August 13, 1934, Georg and Martin Tietz were also ousted as managing directors and owners of the company. The Jewish shareholders had to surrender their shares to Hertie GmbH. According to Bähr and Köhler, the company assets were valued to the detriment of the Tietz family in the course of the settlement agreement, and Hertie management reported a capital deficit of approximately 29 million Reichsmarks. Oscar Tietz's widow and silent partner, Betty Tietz balanced this deficit with her entire private assets. Bähr and Köhler stated, "the surrender of the private assets now resulted in a surplus of 15.5 million Reichsmarks. Hertie should have compensated Mrs. Tietz with this amount, but took it without any value in return". The Tietz family's lawyers were able to negotiate concessions worth around 2.5 million Reichsmarks and an exemption from the Reich Flight Tax in the settlement agreement.

After the Tietz/Zwillenberg family was forced out of the group, Hermann Tietz & Co. was taken over by Hertie Kaufhaus-Beteiligungs GmbH. The firm was then renamed Hertie Waren- und Kaufhaus GmbH and operated under this name until it was sold in 1993.

Karg later bought up the banking group's shares in Hertie GmbH in two installments. In May 1937, he took over 51 percent of the shares with the help of proceeds from the sale of the group's real estate holdings and a loan from Dresdner Bank. From June 1940 on, he held 100 percent of the shares. At the same time, Karg took over the Tietz Group's debts.

According to Bähr and Köhler, Karg did not take over the department store group as an "Aryanizer", but profited from the "Aryanization" like no other party. He also acquired Jewish-owned department stores in Guben, East Prussia and Berlin which had been in private ownership.

In 1942, Josef Neckermann founded the Zentrallagergemeinschaft für Bekleidung GmbH (ZLG) [central warehouse union for clothing] with Georg Karg, which initially produced and supplied textiles and clothing for German construction workers and forced laborers, and later also for the Wehrmacht.

=== Reconstruction after 1945 ===
At the end of the war, most of the Hertie Group's stores were in the Soviet occupation zone while many of those in the west had been destroyed. Karg nevertheless decided to continue running the stores.

In 1949, Karg reached a settlement concerning the Nazi-era expropriation of the Jewish Tietz family.

In 1953, Karg established the Hertie Foundation with the entire department store assets of more than DM 1 billion as a contribution. After the fall of the Berlin Wall, the foundation participated in the then current trend of founding private universities with the Hertie School of Governance.

At Karg's death in 1972, the department store group consisted of 72 Hertie department stores and 29 branches of the Bilka department stores, with sales of DM 5.1 billion and around 60,000 employees. His son Hans-Georg Karg took over the management of the company in 1972. Karg junior sold Hertie to Karstadt in 1994.

== Literature ==
- Johannes Bähr, Ingo Köhler, Verfolgt, „arisiert“, wiedergutgemacht? Wie aus dem Warenhauskonzern Hermann Tietz Hertie wurde, München 2023, ISBN 978-3-8275-0180-6
- Hans Otto Eglau: Georg Karg. Der Herr von Hertie. In: Ders.: Die Kasse muß stimmen. So hatten sie Erfolg im Handel. Econ, Düsseldorf 1972, ISBN 978-3-430-12325-9, S. 33–49.
- Friedrich W. Köhler: Zur Geschichte der Warenhäuser. Seenot und Untergang des Hertie-Konzerns. Haag + Herchen, Frankfurt am Main 1997, ISBN 978-3-86137-544-9
- Simone Ladwig-Winters: Wertheim – ein Warenhausunternehmen und seine Eigentümer. Ein Beispiel der Entwicklung der Berliner Warenhäuser bis zur „Arisierung“. Lit-Verlag, Münster 1997, ISBN 3-8258-3062-4, zu Tietz siehe S. 149–158 und 176–189, Inhaltsverzeichnis.
