= World of Music (TV program) =

World of Music is a CBC classical music series. In 1968 Glenn Gould introduced a series of six television specials. The series continued into the early 1970s.
