= Oberpollinger =

Department store in Munich, Germany

Coordinates: 48.1392°N 11.5677°E

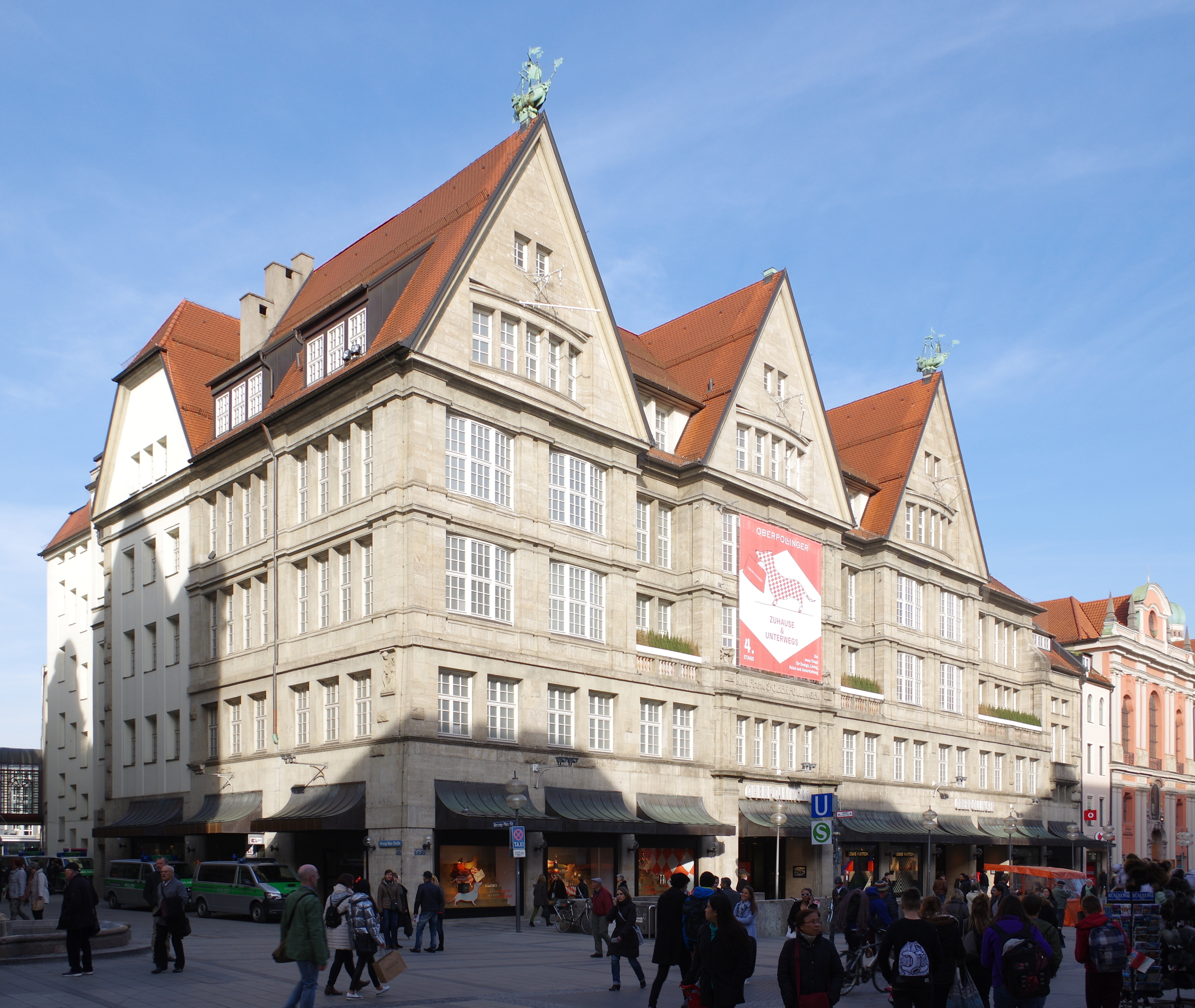
Oberpollinger (2017)

Logo

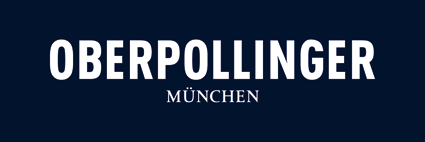
Logo from 2010 to 2016

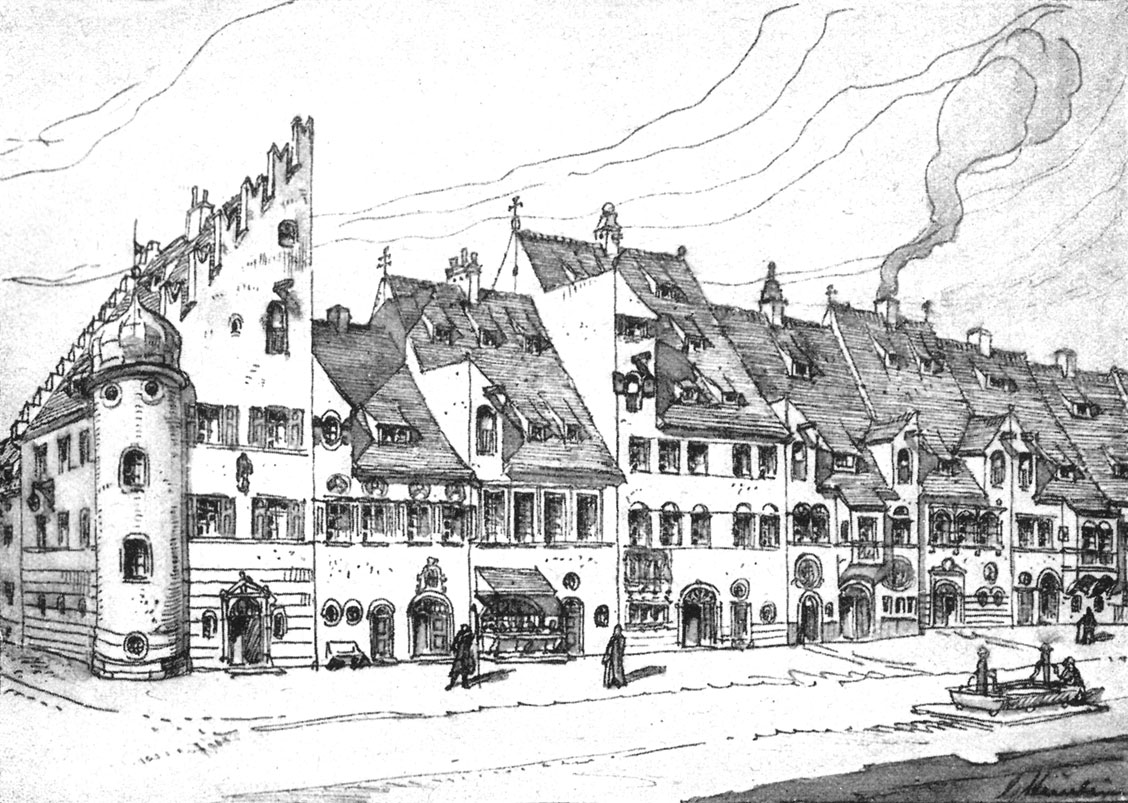
Reconstructed view of the property as it looked in 1570, drawing by Gustav Steinlein

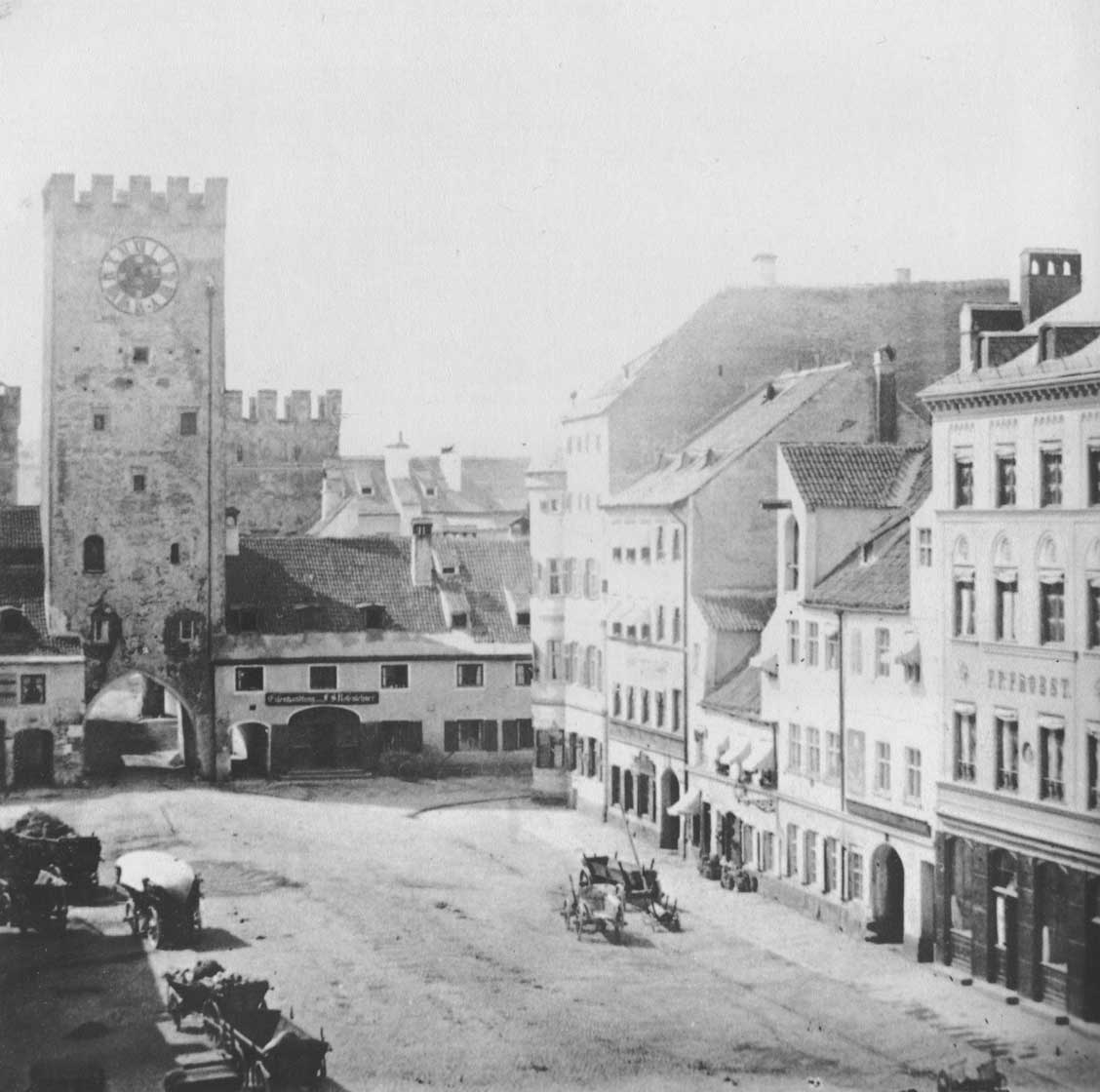
View in 1857

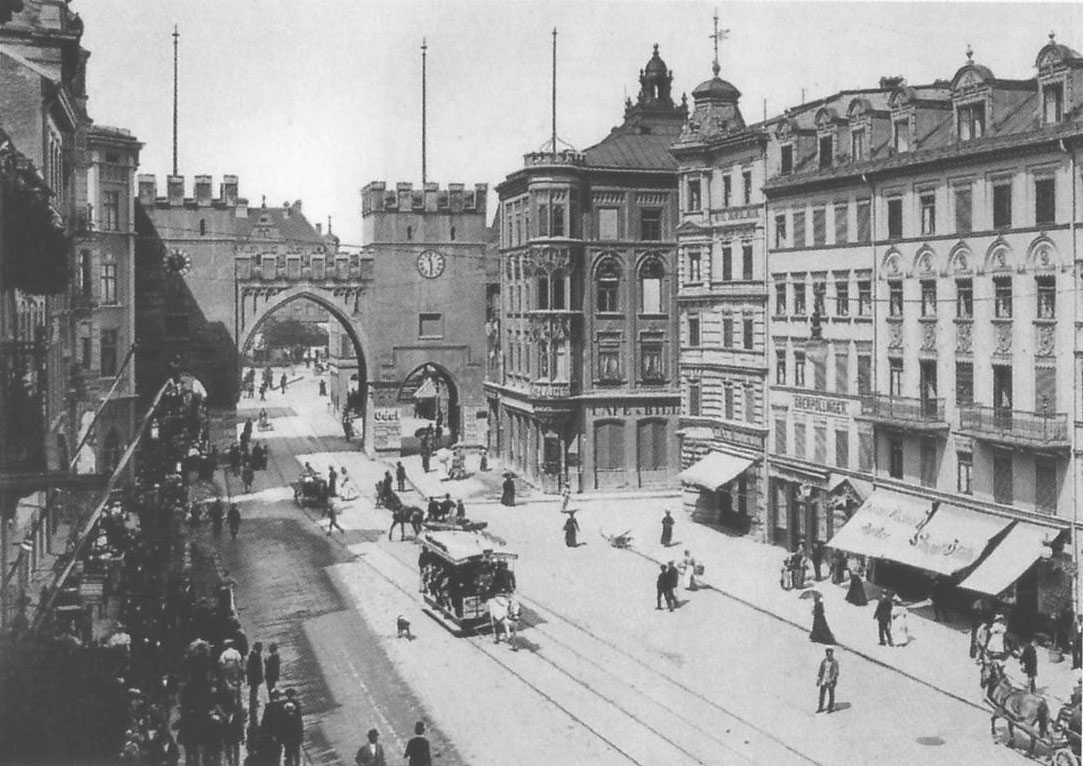
New buildings of 1891 in a view from 1900

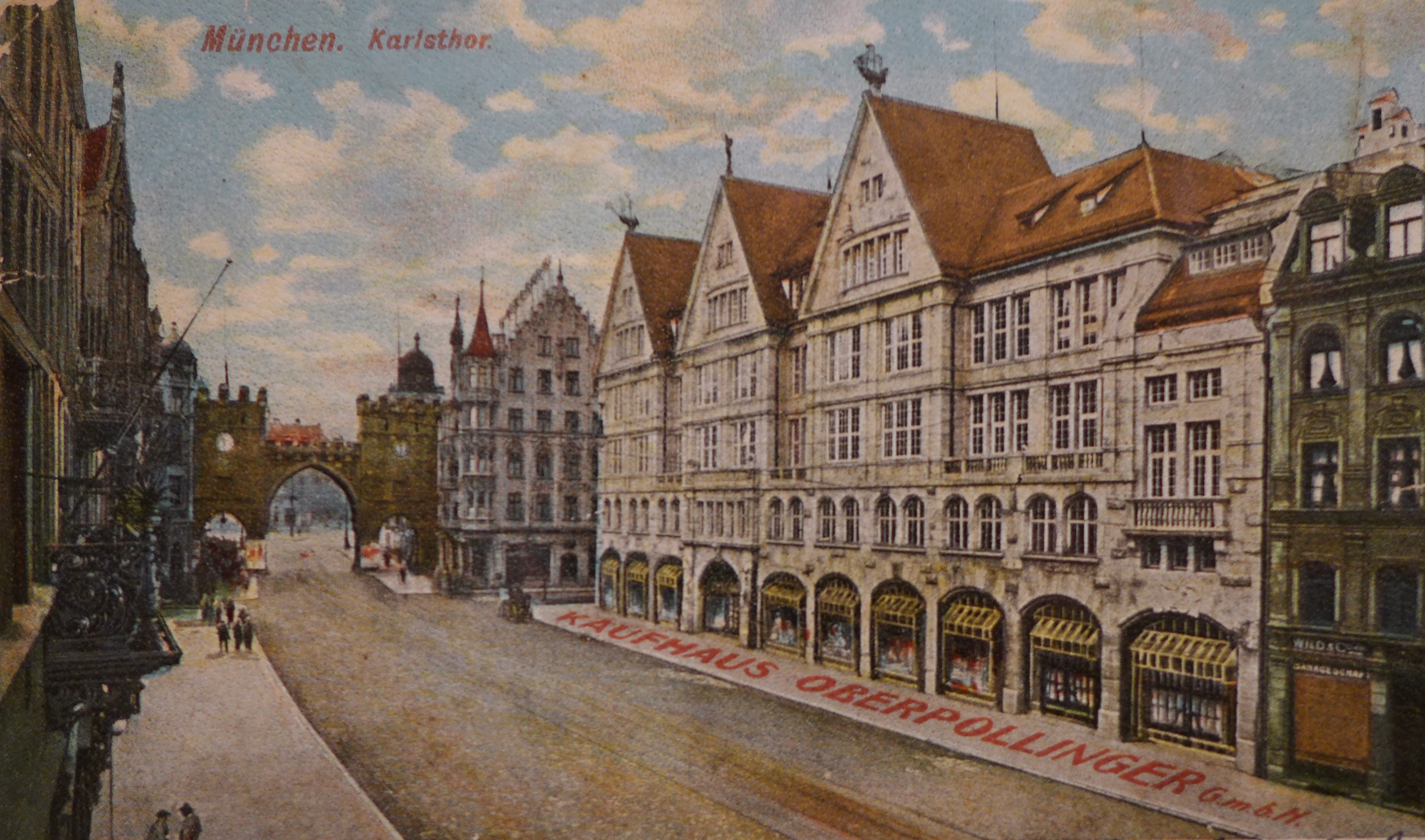
With arches on the ground and 1st floors, later removed, postcard from 1905

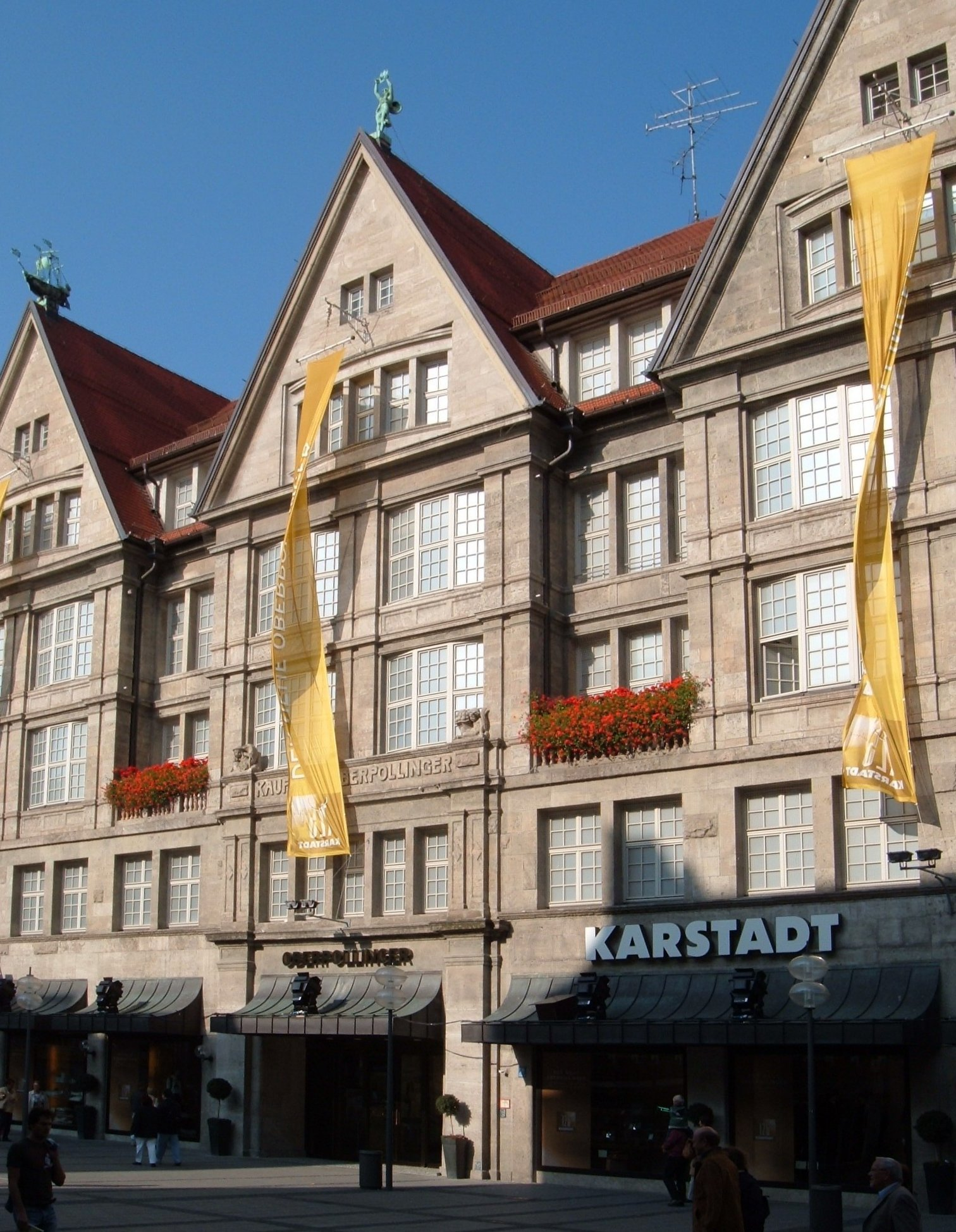
The gables of the façade (still with Karstadt lettering in 2006)

The Oberpollinger is a well-known upscale department store on Neuhauser Straße in Munich. It is run by KaDeWe Group GmbH (formerly Karstadt Premium GmbH) and is the largest department store in Southern Germany. The building was built in 1905 by Max Littmann in the style of Historicism in the form of the Neo-Renaissance and is a listed building.

== History ==
In the floor plan of today's building there were originally five narrow medieval town houses and on the eastern corner the building of the princely customs office, as can be seen from the Sandtner city model from 1570. In 1837 the customs office was converted into the ducal salt office. The neighboring house had been a brewery since 1556, changing hands several times until it was taken over by the brewer Christoph Pollinger in 1584. His family, a long-established brewery dynasty, owned property near Angerkloster, near Sendlinger Straße, a second brewery. The people of Munich soon differentiated between the “lower” and the “upper” Pollinger. This is how the name “Oberpollinger” came about. In 1850, a master brewer from Kulmbach named Heiss acquired the brewery, which had also been a bar since 1842, and in 1853 he bought the Salzamt to the west. Since 1861, the two houses to the east, the Oberpollinger brewery and restaurant, were also united under one ownership.

Despite all the renovations in the meantime, the architecture was still essentially medieval and was replaced in 1891. The Hôtel Oberpollinger in the late classicism style took over the name of the brewery and spanned the former four properties. The hotel was not successful. It was sold in 1899, 1901 and 1903 and was put into compulsory auction at the end of 1903. The Hamburg department store company acquired M. J. Emden Söhne took over the property and had the building demolished. The city attached importance to widening the Herzog-Max-Straße to the west. The company also purchased the two medieval buildings adjacent to the east. Because it left a portion of the street space in the west to the city, it was given the right to combine the former six properties and build a department store throughout.

For this purpose, the Kaufhaus Oberpollinger G.m.b.H. was founded. In 1904, the architect Max Littmann presented a design that he had to revise several times and had the new department store built on Neuhauser Strasse in just around ten months of construction, which opened on March 14, 1905.

In 1927, Rudolph Karstadt AG took over the entire company M. J. Emden Söhne also the Munich department store Oberpollinger; The traditional name was deliberately retained in order to signal continuity to customers. In 1931 the building was expanded and partially rebuilt by the architect Philipp Schaefer.

The department store was badly damaged on January 8, 1945, during an air raid. It was partially reopened in 1947.

In 2005 and 2006, the department store was completely rebuilt and an area of 13,600 square meters was added with an extension to the north; The architect was Ulrike Lauber. After the complete reopening in October 2006, the Oberpollinger, together with the Karstadt Haus Oberpollinger am Dom, which was structurally separate from the main building and almost 200 meters away, now comprised a sales area of 53,000 square meters and was therefore briefly behind the KaDeWe is the second largest department store in Germany.

Since 2007, the former Haus am Karlstor no longer appears as Karstadt Oberpollinger, but as Oberpollinger München, until 2010 with the much smaller addition Karstadt Premium Group. This addition was also removed in order to clearly differentiate the brand from Karstadt branches. The former Karstadt Haus Oberpollinger am Dom was at the same time renamed Karstadt Haus am Dom. The sports store, which is connected to the Oberpollinger through a transition on the first floor and in the basement, was renamed from Karstadt Oberpollinger Sport to Karstadt sports at the beginning of 2008. At the end of March 2010, the Haus am Dom was closed.

=== Recent history ===
In June 2011, Centrum and Signa Holding acquired the Oberpollinger and neighbouring Karstadt Sporthaus properties for €250 million.

Signa purchased 75.1% of shares in Kardstadt Premium GmbH (which Oberpollinger was a part of) in September of 2013 and of Karstadt Sports GMbH. In November, Signa handed over half of its shares (37.55%) to Beny Steinmetz.

Karstadt Premium GmbH was renamed to KaDeWe Group in October of 2014, Steinmetz gave back his share in the KaDeWe Group to Signa also in 2014. In 2015 the majority share was then sold to the Thailand-based Central Group.

Signa filed for bankruptcy in 2023 and in 2024 the KaDeWe Group became fully owned by Central Group.

== Original architecture ==
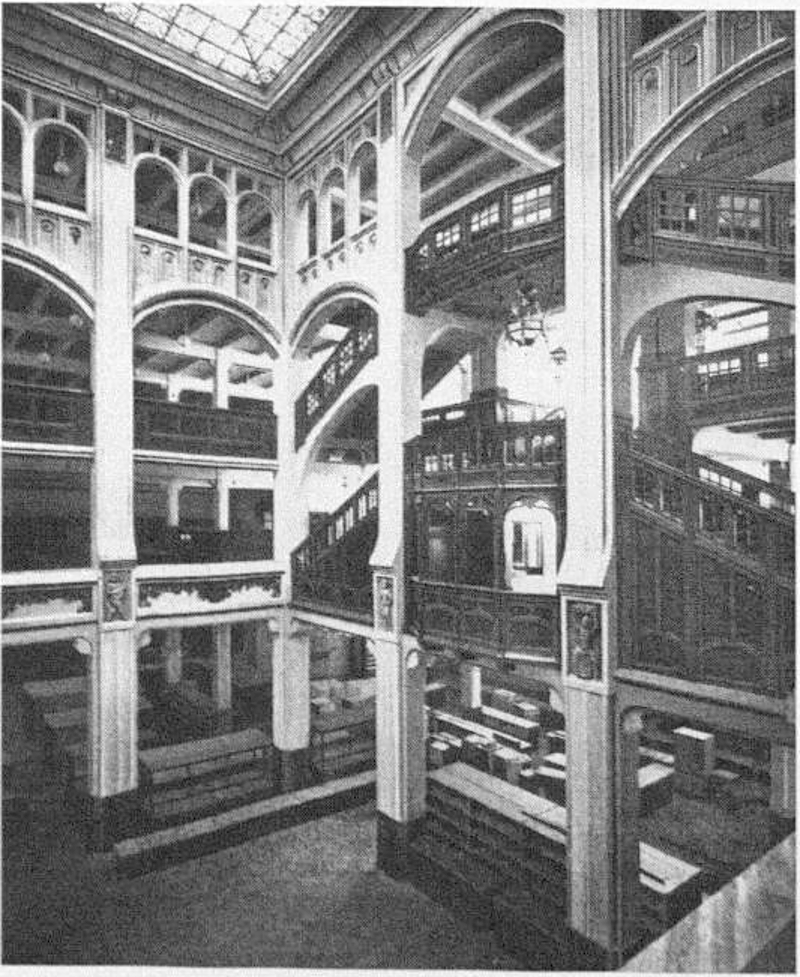
The atrium with stairs (1905)

At the instigation of the Munich Artists' Commission, which advised the city council, the architect Max Littmann had to revise his designs several times in order not to dominate Neuhauser Straße with its small-scale development and the neighboring Bürgersaal. Finally, it was agreed to structure the facade and cover it with natural stone. After around ten months of construction, the new department store on Neuhauser Straße was opened in 1905. As a reference to the Hamburg origins of the department store operators, two of the three gables have weather vanes in the shape of merchant ships.

Max Littmann designed the department store according to the most modern possibilities of his time. The iron frame structure consisted of beams that were aligned on a grid. They were covered with concrete for fire protection. The facades are clad with shell limestone, the decorative elements of the facades come from the sculptors Heinrich Düll and Georg Pezold.

Including the ground floor, the department store had four floors of sales space, above which there was another floor for administration and a basement with staff cloakrooms, storage and loading areas.

Since the exterior had to be adapted to the surroundings, Littmann was unable to install large window fronts. Instead, he designed a central atrium with a glass dome, in which the four passenger elevators were also located. The volume was 35,292 cubic meters. The costs were given as 1,097,000 Mark.

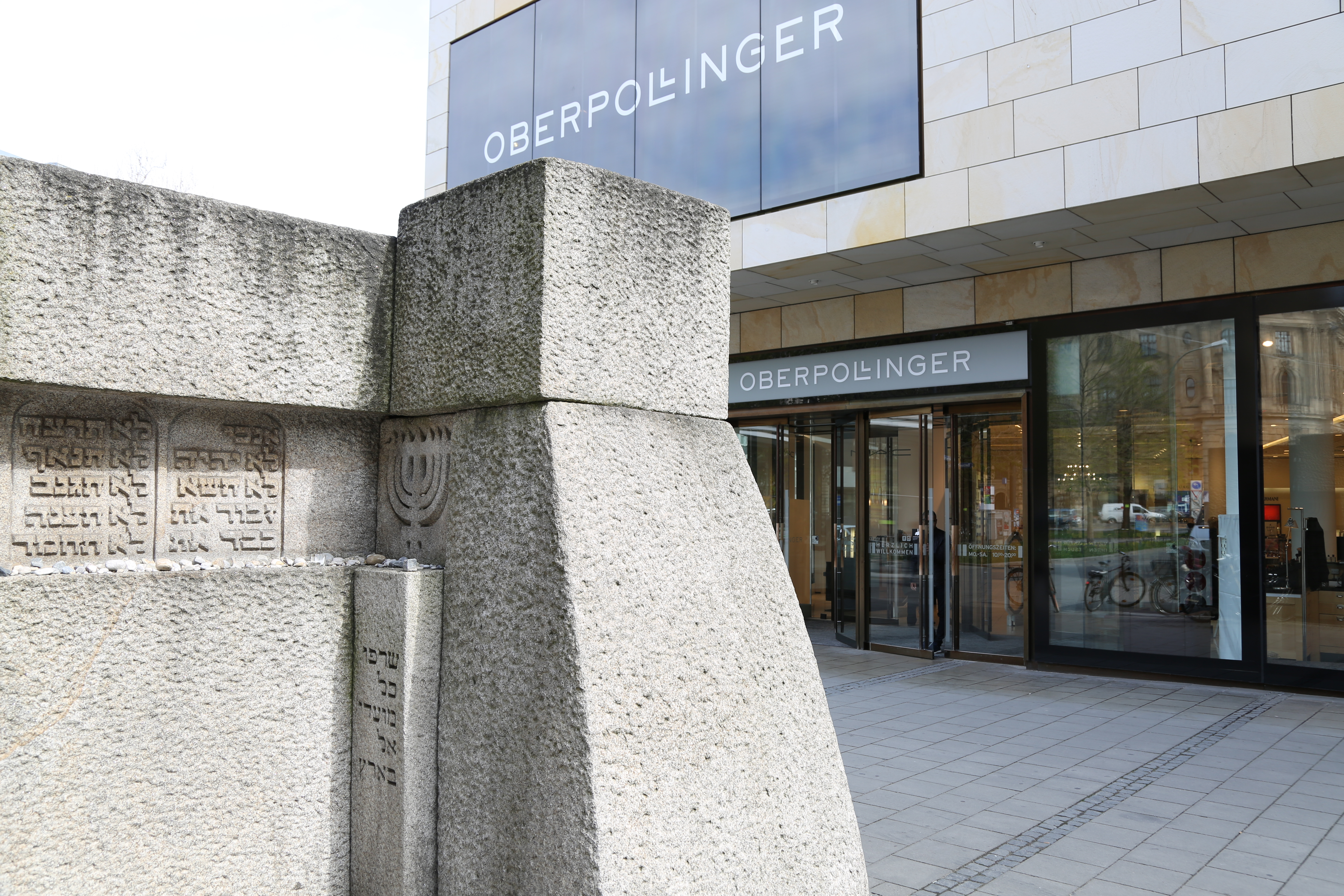
Oberpollinger extension building with the memorial stone for the Old Main Synagogue
