= Hess Natur =

Hess Natur-Textilien GmbH
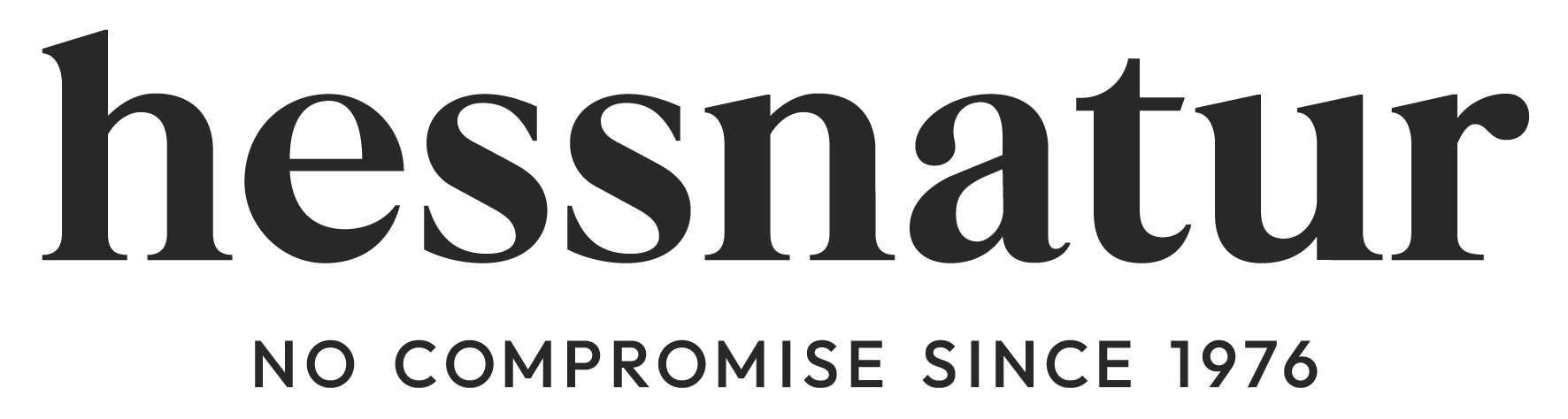
- Industry: Natural textiles
- Founded: 1976
- Headquarters: Butzbach, Germany
- Revenue: 100 million euros (fiscal year 2020/21)
- Number of employees: 370
- Website: www.hessnatur.com/

Hess Natur (written as hessnatur) is a German natural textile mail order company based in Butzbach in the Wetterau district of Hesse. Its range of products is aimed at nature-conscious or special customers, such as people with allergies.

== History ==
The company was founded in 1976 by Heinz Hess and Dorothea Hess under the name 'dorothea hess - Versand naturgemäßer Waren' (dorothea hess - mail order of natural goods) in Bad Homburg vor der Höhe. The joint management ran until 1982.

In 1986, the expanding company moved to a larger building in Bad Homburg, from where the shop and mail order business was run.

In 2001, Neckermann acquired a majority stake in the company (100% as of 5 January 2001). From October 2008 to August 2012, Wolf Lüdge was the managing director.

In 2009, hessnatur had around 320 employees, 270 of whom worked in Butzbach.

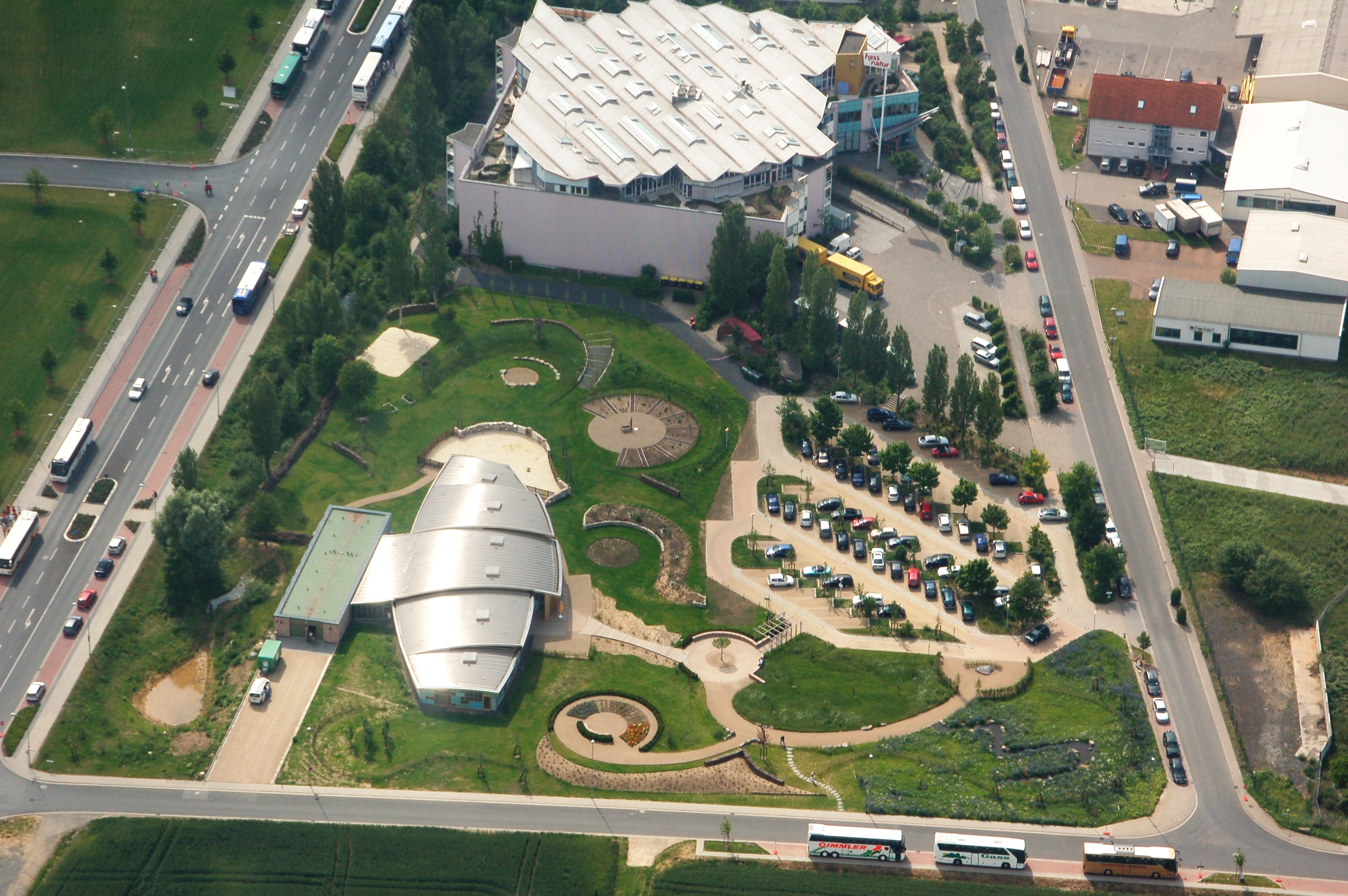
Aerial view of Butzbach in 2007

Annual turnover in 2009 was around €58 million, and €60 million in 2010. The insolvency of Karstadt/Quelle and Arcandor also affected the holding company Primondo, to which Hess Natur had been assigned.

At the end of 2010, it was announced that the US private equity firm Carlyle Group wanted to take over Hess Natur. At the end of 2010, the Triaz Group, which includes Freiburg-based Waschbär Umweltversand, also expressed interest in Hess Natur.

On 17 March 2011, a group of employees, customers, and individuals associated with the organisations Attac, Christian Initiative Romero, and Kampagne für saubere Kleidung founded the cooperative hnGeno to purchase Hess Natur. This was intended to prevent the sale to Carlyle. In May 2011, Carlyle withdrew its bid.

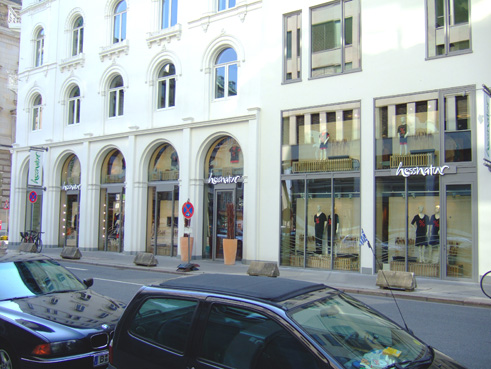
Shop in Hamburg: exterior

After several months of speculation about bids submitted and accepted, the bidding process was suspended indefinitely in June 2011; the owners were to continue running the company in the coming months. However, a purchase agreement between Primondo and the Swiss investor Capvis had already been signed on 31 May 2012. It was subject to approval by the antitrust authorities, which was granted at the end of June. According to the Frankfurter Allgemeine Zeitung, Capvis paid the equivalent of around 48 million Swiss francs for Hess Natur. The works council filed a lawsuit against the management because of what it considered to be non-transparent sales negotiations. The Giessen Labour Court dismissed the case on 27 June 2012.

In autumn 2012, the hessnatur advisory board was reconstituted; the entrepreneur Götz Werner, founder of the drugstore chain dm, became chairman of the board.

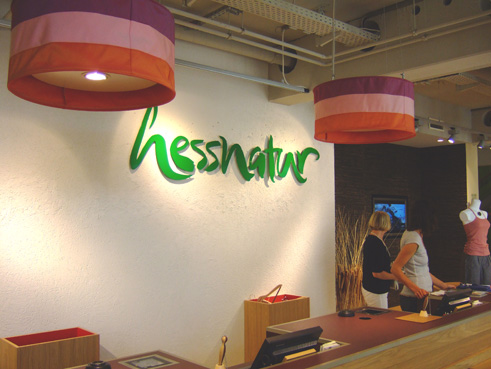
Shop in Hamburg: interior

In the 2020/21 financial year, the threshold of EUR 100 million in sales was exceeded for the first time.

The company continuously strives to ensure ethical production standards among its suppliers and to monitor production efforts.

== Awards ==
In 2010, Stiftung Warentest reviewed 20 T-shirt suppliers for their social and environmental commitment. The review focused on their commitment to the environment and their employees, as well as their corporate policy, consumer information, and transparency. Of the 20 suppliers tested, only Hess Natur demonstrated a strong commitment.
