= Kaufhaus des Westens =

Department store in Berlin

Coordinates: 52°30′06″N 13°20′28″E

KaDeWe GmbH

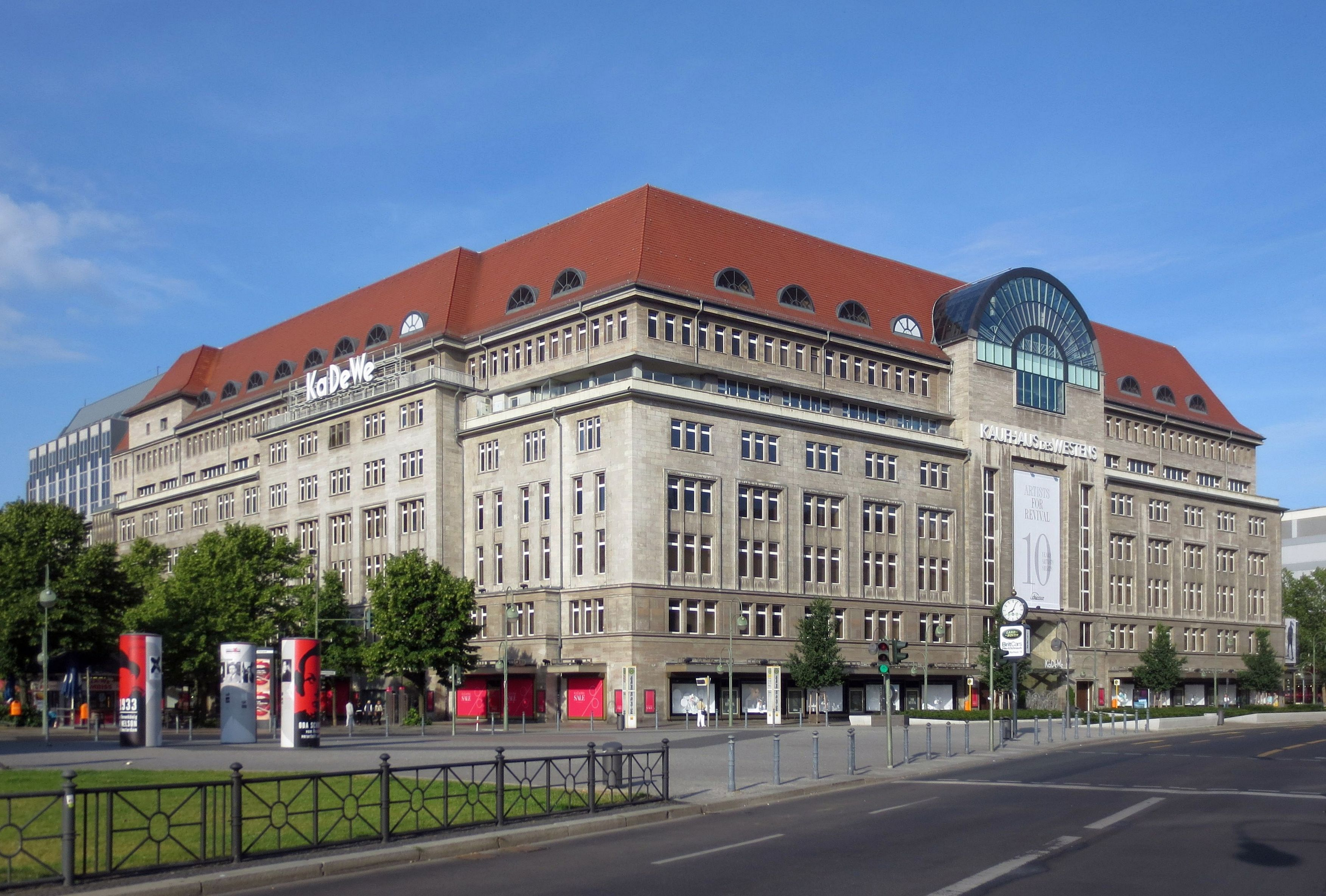
- The store in 2013
- Trade name: KaDeWe
- Industry: Retail
- Genre: Department store
- Founded: March 27, 1907; 119 years ago
- Founder: Adolf Jandorf
- Headquarters: Germany
- Owner: Central Group
- Parent: KaDeWe Group
- Website: kadewe.de

The Kaufhaus des Westens (German for 'Department Store of the West'), abbreviated to KaDeWe, is a department store in Berlin, Germany. With over 60,000 square meters (650,000 sq ft) of retail space and more than 380,000 articles available, it is the second-largest department store in Europe after Harrods in London. It attracts 40,000 to 50,000 visitors every day.

The store is located on Tauentzienstraße, a major shopping street, between Wittenbergplatz and Breitscheidplatz, near the heart of former West Berlin.

== History ==
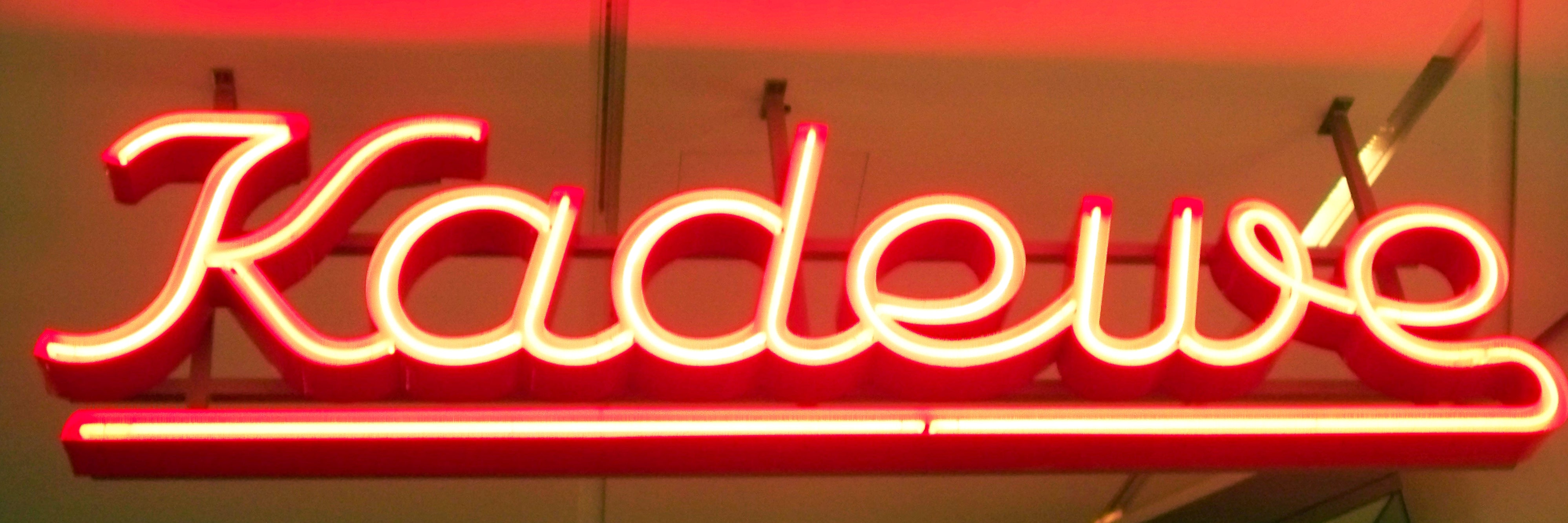
Former neon sign

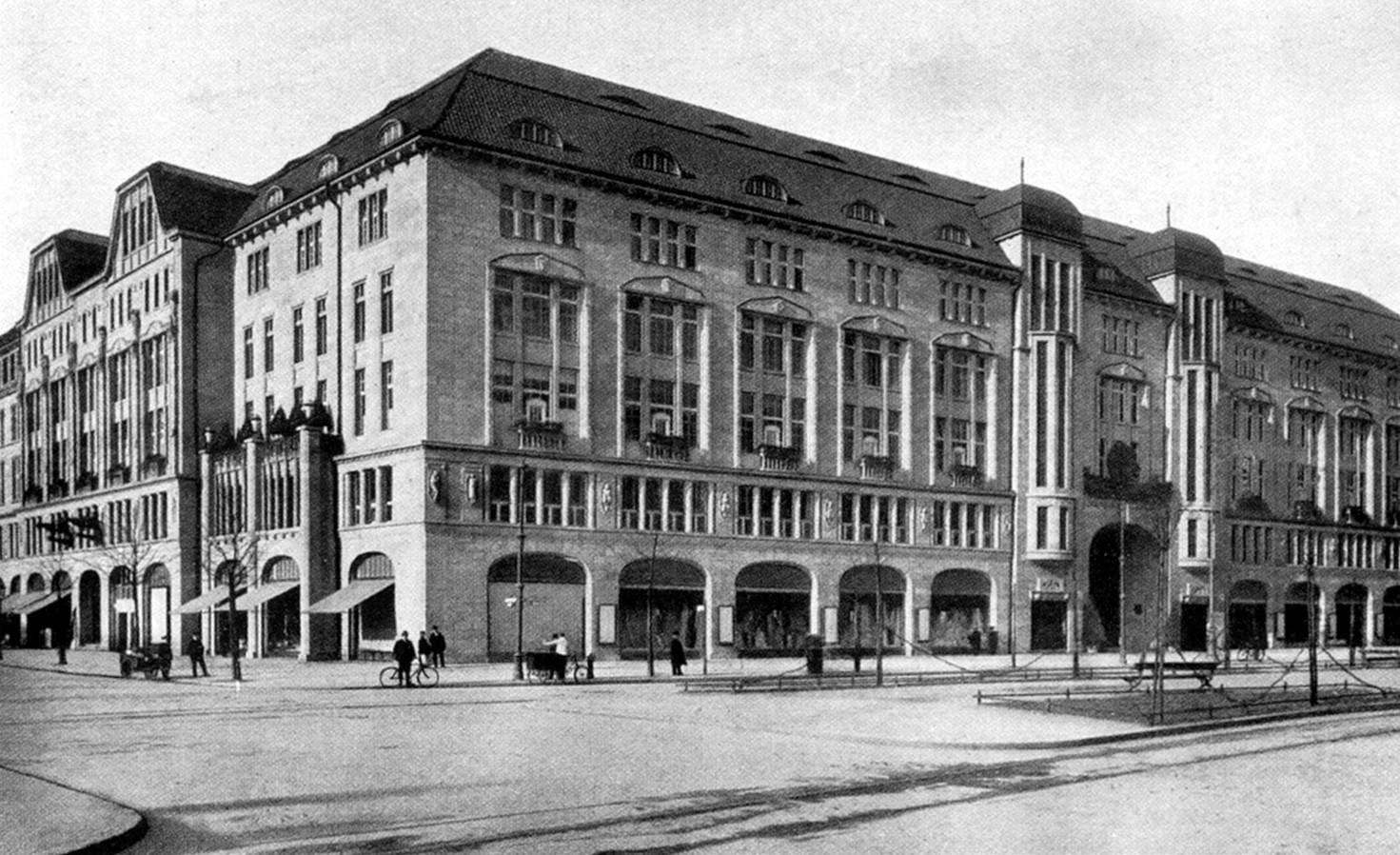
KaDeWe department store, Berlin, 1907

=== Empire and Weimar Republic: the Jandorf Era ===
The businessman Adolf Jandorf had opened six stores for basic needs with his company A. Jandorf & Co. in Berlin by 1905. Like the competitor stores Wertheim Leipziger Strasse (1894) and the Warenhaus Tietz (1900), also on Leipziger Strasse, Jandorf wanted to cater for the high consumer desires of the Wilhelminism elite. Jandorf's seventh branch was supposed to "satisfy the spoiled demands of the top ten thousand, the top one thousand, the very top five hundred," as the weekly cultural magazine Der Roland von Berlin (Zeitschrift) wrote. With a GmbH of the same name founded especially for this purpose, in which his partner company M.J. Emden Söhne (Hamburg) held a four per cent stake, Jandorf began planning the new store in 1905 under the name Kaufhaus des Westens (KaDeWe). It was planned that the term Kaufhaus (department store) should set itself apart from the usual store and wholesaling warehouse. The abbreviation KaDeWe was used from the start and, according to a commemorative publication from 1932, was based on the abbreviation of company names that had become common in the US at the time.

The department store was built to designs by the architect Emil Schaudt. It opened on 27 March 1907 with a floor space of 24,000 sq m.

In June 1927, ownership changed to Hermann Tietz OHG, which was responsible for modernizing and expanding the store. The company wanted to add two new floors, but because of the Nazi rise to power in the 1930s these plans came to a sudden halt.

=== Nazi era ===
Hermann Tietz OHG was a Jewish-owned partnership and because of the Nazis' anti-Jewish laws the company was aryanized—that is, transferred to non-Jewish owners—and its name changed to Hertie.

During World War II, Berlin became the target of frequent Allied bombing. On the night of 28/29 January 1944, a Royal Air Force Halifax bomber was downed by the Germans and crashed directly into the store, killing the plane's seven crew members, destroying the building's upper levels and causing a fire that burned out the rest of the building.

=== Postwar ===
Alternate KaDeWe department store logo

The re-opening of the first two floors was celebrated in 1950. Full reconstruction of all seven floors was finished by 1956. "KaDeWe" soon became a symbol of the regained economic power of West Germany during the Wirtschaftswunder economic boom, as well as emblematic of the material prosperity of West Berlin versus that of the East.

Between 1976 and 1978, the store's floor space was expanded from 24,000 sq m to 44,000 sq m. Just after the fall of the Berlin Wall in 1989, KaDeWe recorded a record-breaking number of people going through the store. By 1996, with a further floor and restaurant added, the sales area had expanded to 60,000 sq m.

In 1994, the KarstadtQuelle AG corporation acquired Hertie and with it, KaDeWe. Most of the floors were renovated between 2004 and 2007 in preparation for the store's 100th anniversary.

In January 2014, a majority stake in Karstadt Premium GmbH was acquired by the Signa Holding GmbH. In 2015, it was acquired by the Bangkok-based Central Group. Central now owns 100% of the KaDeWe Group.

=== KaDeWe Group ===
In 2015, the KaDeWe Group was established, consisting of KaDeWe, Alsterhaus in Hamburg, and Oberpollinger in Munich. The KaDeWe Group was jointly owned by the Central Group, a Thailand-based international department store conglomerate and Signa Holding. Until 2024, Signa wholly owned the KaDeWe building, leasing it back to the business.

In 2022, the KaDeWe Group announced plans to expand to Vienna, Austria with Lamarr, named after Hedy Lamarr. and Carsch-Haus in Düsseldorf.

The KaDeWe Group filed for bankruptcy on 29 January 2024, due to significantly rising rents on the Berlin building.

The Central Group bought the KaDeWe building on April 12, 2024, from the insolvent Signa, for €1 billion, and announced they were in talks to acquire Signa's interest in the KaDeWe Group. Central officially purchased 100% of the KaDeWe Group (KaDeWe, Alsterhaus and Oberpollinger) later in the year.

== Features ==
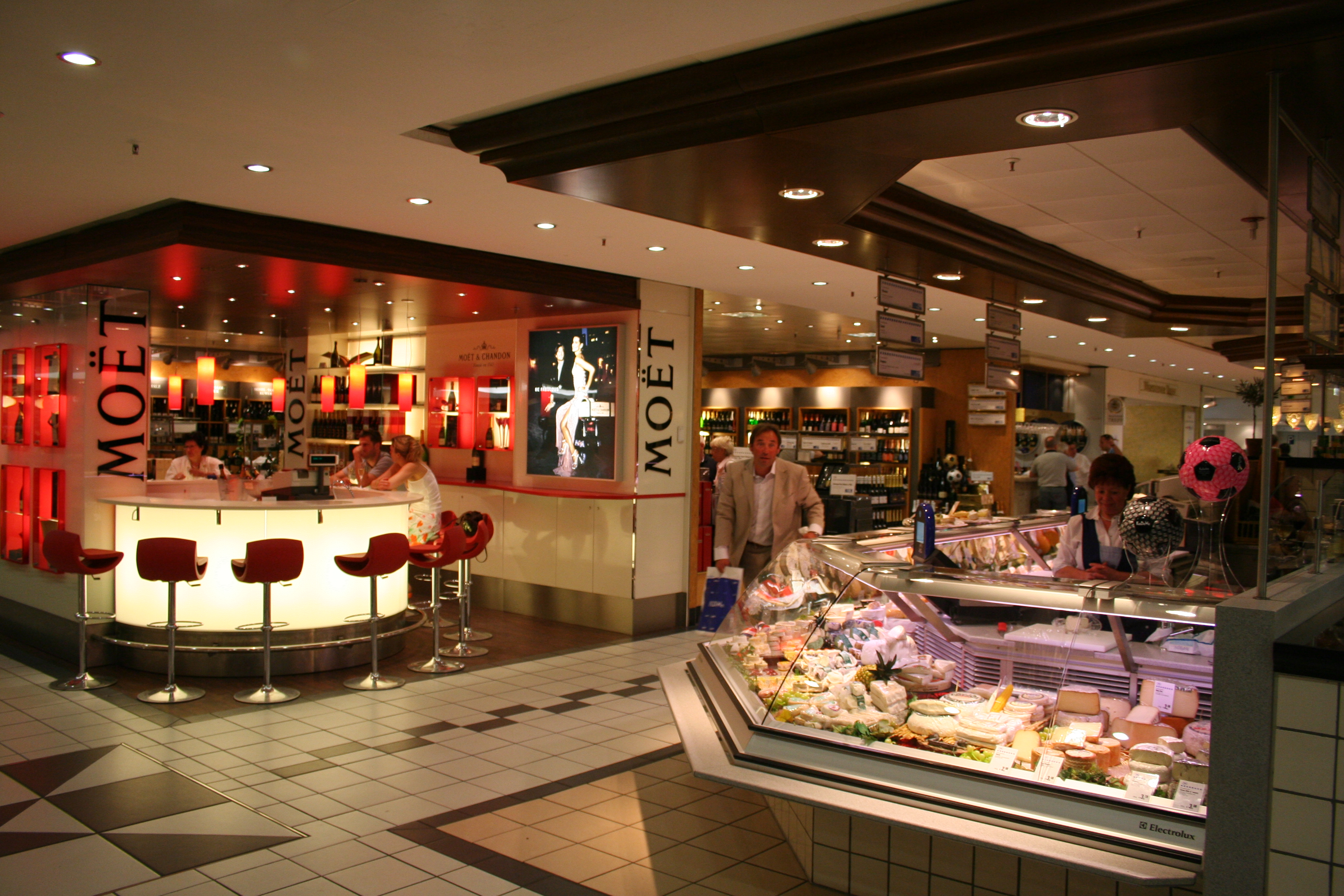
The food hall on the sixth floor

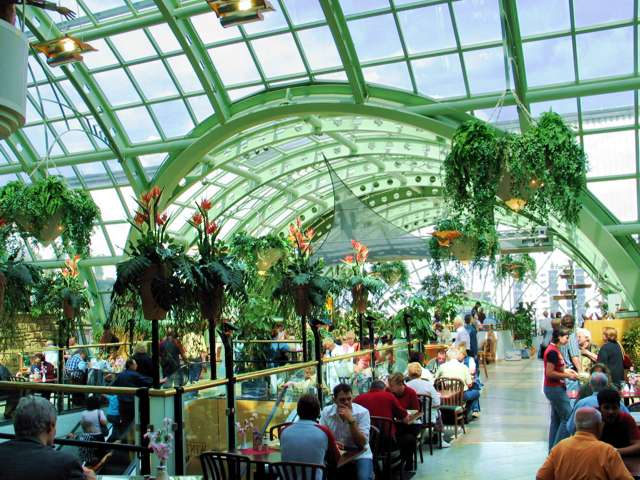
Winter garden, restaurant at top floor

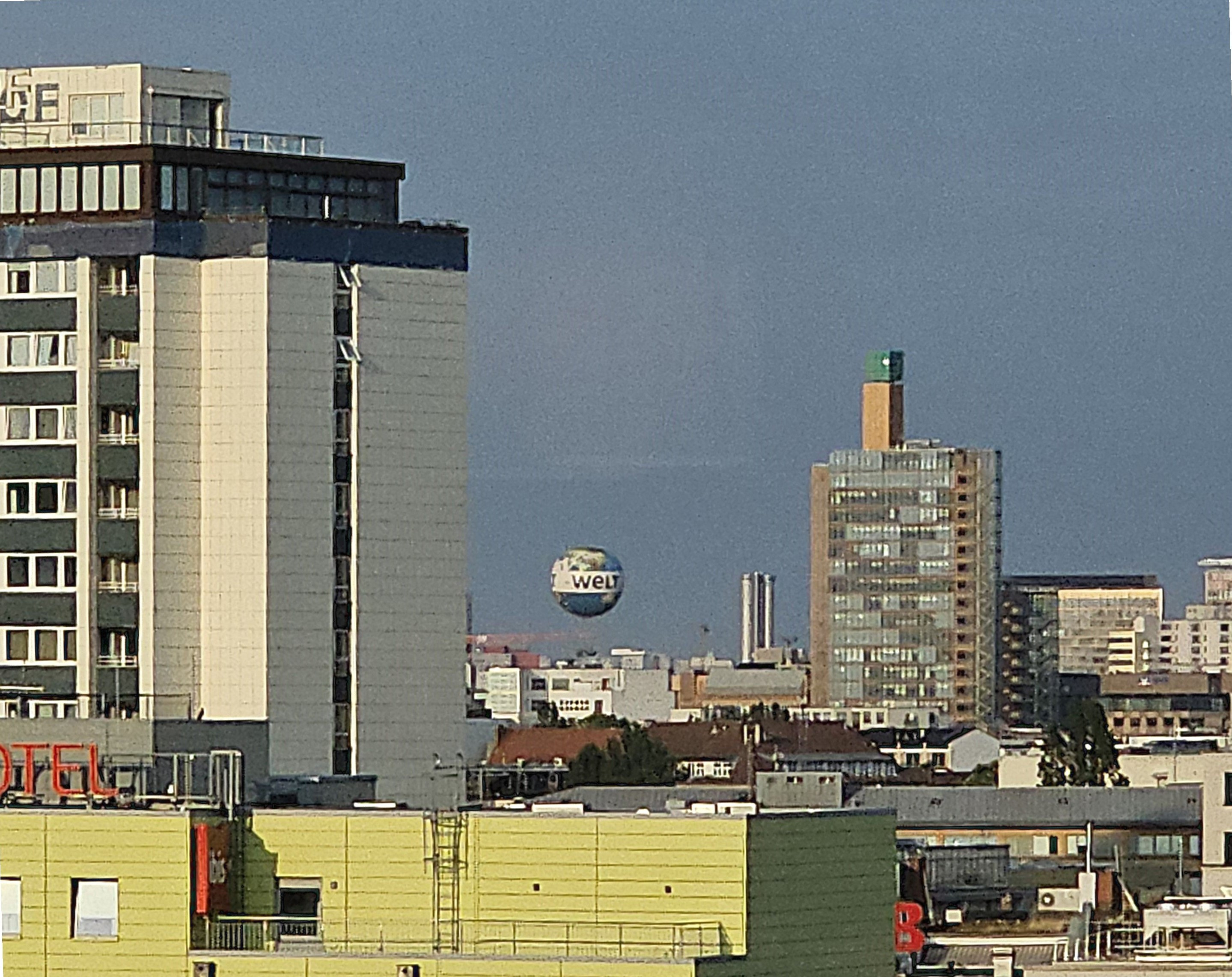
View from 7th floor

KaDeWe has eight floors, each focused on a different type of merchandise.

Ground floor: Cosmetics and luxury goods. The services offered include beauty salons as well as nail and foot spas. The so-called "Luxury Boulevard" is also situated here, with various luxury brands.

1st floor: Men's apparel.

2nd floor: Women's fashion.

3rd floor: Women's accessories, jewelry, shoes, leather goods and lingerie.

4th floor: Kids World – toys, books, sports.

5th floor: Home goods, kitchenware, furniture, electronics, toys, office supplies.

6th and 7th floors are entirely devoted to food, and are advertised as having two football fields of food.

6th floor: food hall, famous for its wide variety of groceries, food and beverages. It has around 110 cooks and 40 bakers and confectioners, supplying 35 gourmet counters and restaurants.

7th floor: (added in the early 1990s) includes a winter garden with a 1000-seat restaurant surrounded by an all-windowed wall offering a view over Wittenbergplatz.

== Media ==
In 2021 KaDeWe: Our Time Is Now, a six-part TV mini-series set in and around the store, was produced in Germany, based on the somewhat fictionalised lives of Harry Jandorf (son of the store's founder), Georg Karg (the store's manager), together with two completely fictional characters, Fritzi Jandorf (daughter of the store's founder) and Hedi (a store worker), set between the end of World War I and the aryanisation of the store as the Nazis came to power. The series was shown in BBC4's Saturday night "foreign language" slot in mid-2022, subtitled in English.

== Bibliography ==
- Antonia Meiners: 100 Jahre KaDeWe. Nicolaische Verlagsbuchhandlung, Berlin 2007, 168 p., 80 colour photos, 80 b&w photos, clothbound, ISBN 978-3-89479-386-9, summary in german
- Nils Busch-Petersen: Adolf Jandorf – Vom Volkswarenhaus zum KaDeWe, Hentrich & Hentrich, Berlin 2007, 80 p., ISBN 978-3-938485-10-1
- KaDeWe: Colourful western goods. In: Sites of Unity (Haus der Geschichte), 2023.
