= Arcandor =

Holding company

Arcandor AG
- Type: Public
- Traded as: FWB: ARO
- Industry: Retail
- Founded: 1999; 27 years ago
- Defunct: 2009
- Fate: Bankruptcy
- Headquarters: Essen, Germany
- Number of employees: 68,000 (2005)
- Website: www.arcandor.com

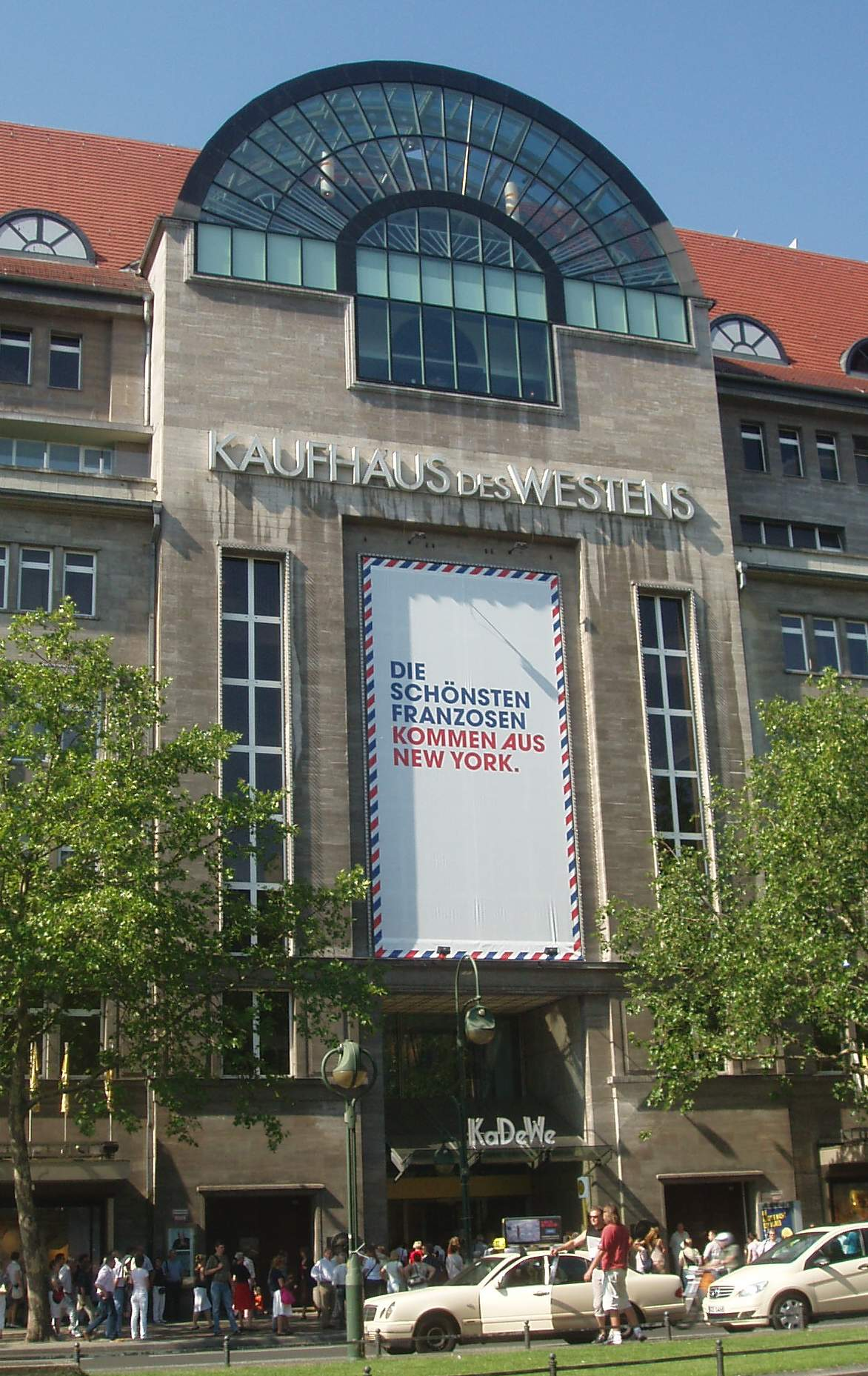
KaDeWe Berlin – June 2007

Arcandor AG was a holding company located in Essen, Germany, that oversaw a number of companies operating in the businesses of mail order and internet shopping, department stores and tourism services. It was formed in 1999 by the merger of Karstadt Warenhaus AG, founded in 1920, with Quelle AG, founded in 1927. In 2005, the corporation had about 68,000 employees and annual sales of €15.5 billion. Its stocks were traded on the Mid Cap DAX until September 2009. The company's largest store was Kaufhaus des Westens (KaDeWe) in Berlin, and the largest store operated by Karstadt was in Frankfurt.

Arcandor requested financial assistance from the German government, which was rejected by the European Commission on 3 June 2009. On 6 June 2009, the company announced it was no longer able to pay rent for its department stores, which the company had previously sold and leasebacked. Three days later, the company filed for bankruptcy.

== History ==
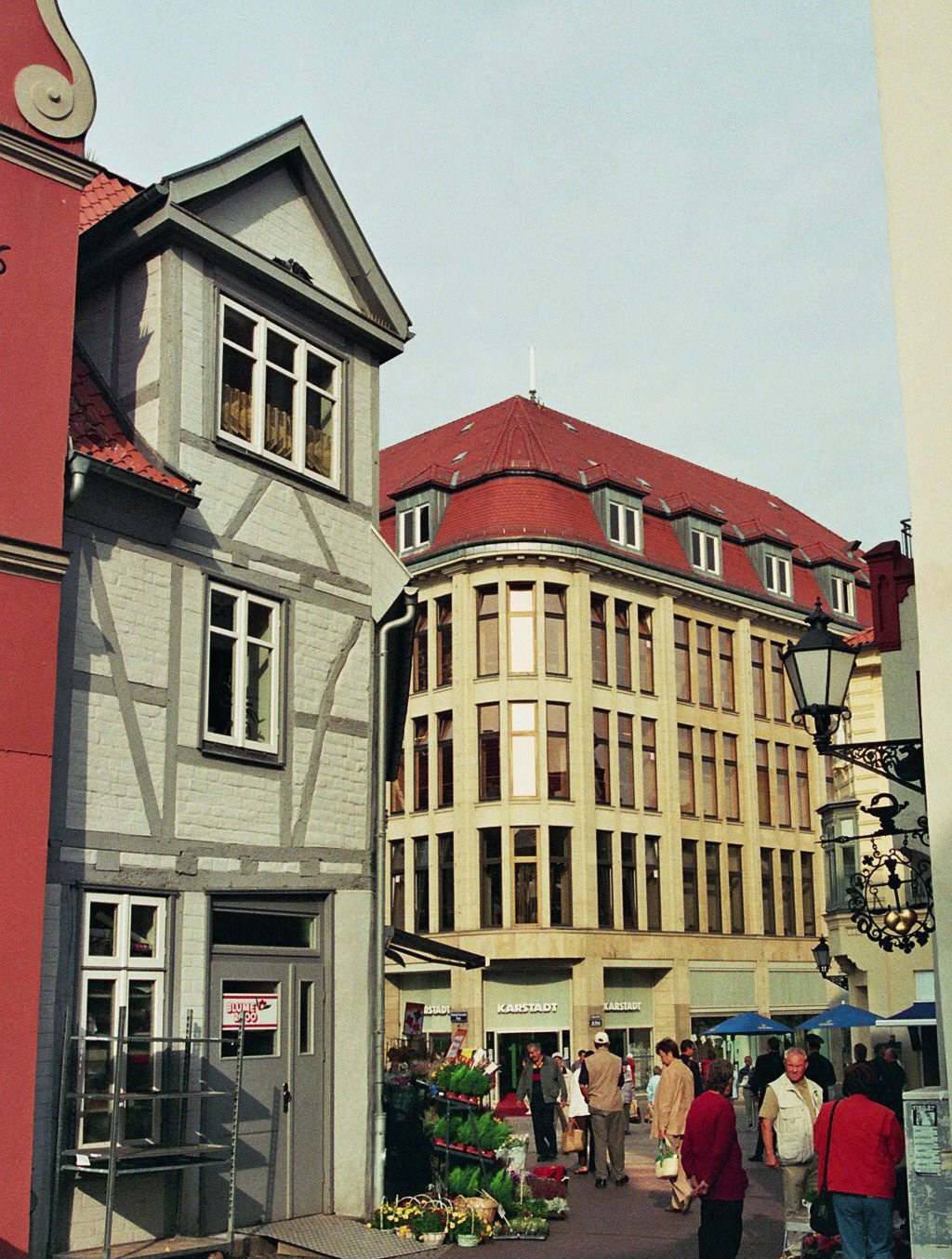
The first Karstadt department store opened in 1881 in Wismar.

On 14 May 1881, Rudolph Karstadt founded his first store Tuch-, Manufaktur- und Konfektionsgeschäft Karstadt (Karstadt fabric, factory outlet and ready-to wear store) in Wismar. In 1884, a second store was opened in Lübeck. Soon, 24 stores had been opened in all of Northern Germany. In 1920, the business was turned into a joint stock company.

== Nazi era ==
When the Nazis came to power in 1933, department stores founded by Jewish families like the Tietz and the Wertheims were forcibly transferred to non-Jewish owners in a process called "Aryanization". KarstadtQuelle acquired many businesses and properties in this period.

== Postwar ==
In 1984, Karstadt acquired the mail-order business Neckermann Versand. In 1994, it acquired the department store chain Hertie, to which KaDeWe belonged. In 1999 it merged with Quelle AG to become KarstadtQuelle AG. On 1 July 2007 the company was renamed Arcandor AG.

On 5 June 2009, investigations started into possible breach of trust offenses by Arcandor's former CEO Thomas Middelhoff.

In June 2009, Arcandor filed for bankruptcy protection after its request for loan guarantees of up to €650 million was rejected by the German government. The German government subsequently agreed on 30 June to provide a €71 million loan to Quelle. The company's holding in the Thomas Cook Group was sold by Arcandor's creditor banks in September 2009.

The administrators of Arcandor chose in October 2009 to liquidate the Quelle mail order business, following unsuccessful attempts to find a buyer.

In September 2010 the American investor Nicolas Berggruen bought the Karstadt business to save it from insolvency.

== Business segments ==
Arcandor was active in the following business segments:

- Brick-and-mortar operations:
  - Department stores: Karstadt, KaDeWe, Wertheim, Alsterhaus, Oberpollinger, WoM (World of Music), Schaulandt, LeBuffet, Fox Markt
  - Specialty stores: KarstadtSport (athletic equipment, etc.)
- Mail-order:
  - General: neckermann.de (until 2005 known as Neckermann Versand), Quelle
  - Specialty assortments: Walz, Hess Natur, Fritz Berger, Madeleine, BON'A PARTE, clinic+job-dress, DK Berufsmoden, Simon Jersey
- Services:
  - Tourism: Bucher Reisen, Thomas Cook Group (52% ownership)
  - Financial services: KarstadtQuelle Bank, KarstadtQuelle Finanz Service
  - Other services: Customer loyalty scheme (HappyDigits), Itellium, KarstadtQuelle Information Services

== Quelle Company ==
Logo of Quelle

Quelle AG, which merged with Karstadt, was founded on the 26th of October 1927 by Gustav Schickedanz.

=== Nazi Period ===
In 1932 Schickedanz joined the NSDAP and therefore was able to acquire several major companies in the region by Aryanization from their former Jewish owners. 1939 Quelle had around two million regular customers and made 40 million Reichsmark.

=== Restart ===
After the second World War the Allies banned Schickedanz from exercising his profession, his properties were confiscated and he was sentenced to imprisonment with labour. In 1948 he was released, during him serving his sentence, his sister, Liesl Kießling, managed Quelle. His wife opened the first Quelle store after the war, in 1946. Since 1948 the delivery business of Quelle was being rebuilt. As the Denazification Process on Gustav Schickedanz began, it was noted that of Gustav Schickedandanz's past capital of 9 Million Deutsche Mark about 7 Million were of former Jewish ownership.
