= A World of Music (TV program) =

- Genre: Variety show
- Written by: Alex Barris
- Presented by: Malka Himel; Joso Spraljia
- Country of origin: Canada
- Original language: English
- No. of seasons: 1

Production
- Producer: Mark Warren
- Running time: 30 minutes

Original release
- Network: CBC Television
- Release: 17 September – 10 December 1966

A World of Music is a Canadian musical variety show that aired on CBC Television for 13 weeks in 1966.

== Premise ==
This program was hosted by folk singers Malka & Joso (Malka Himel and Joso Spraljia) who presented music in various languages from various cultures. Guests included Ian and Sylvia, Miriam Makeba, Odetta, Jan Rubeš, Sonny Terry with Brownie McGhee and Yma Sumac.

== Production ==
Mark Warren produced the program with Alex Barris as chief writer. Episodes were broadcast in colour starting October 1966. Rudy Toth was musical director with choreography by Andy Body.

== Scheduling ==
The half-hour program aired Saturdays from approximately 10:30 p.m., following Hockey Night in Canada. The series ran from 17 September to 10 December 1966.

== Demise ==
A World of Music was a replacement for the popular Juliette program. Its post-hockey ratings were considerably lower than the previous program and the ethnic content received hostility from some viewers. Alex Barris later attempted to reduce the multicultural approach on the program, a move which caused division between the production staff and the cast. After thirteen weeks, the show was cancelled.
