= Hugo Zwillenberg =

German-Jewish lawyer, entrepreneur and diplomat (1885-1966)

Hermann Hugo (Hugo) Zwillenberg (26 May 1885 in Lyck, East Prussia – 31 October 1966 in Bern; full name: Hermann Hugo Zwillenberg) was a German-Jewish lawyer, entrepreneur and diplomat.

== Life ==
Zwillenberg spent his early years in his native town of Lyck, where he first attended the community school and then the Royal Lyck Gymnasium. After his parents moved to Rastenburg, he attended the Herzog-Albrechts-Gymnasium there, where he passed the Abitur at Easter 1904. Zwillenberg then studied law and political science, first at the Albertus University in Königsberg, then at the Friedrich Wilhelm University of Berlin and finally at the Ludwig-Maximilians-Universität München (LMU) in Munich. In 1908, he passed the first state law examination, then began his practical training as a trainee lawyer. From 1 October 1908 to 30 September 1909 he performed his military service as a one-year volunteer, first until 31 March with the Royal Bavarian 8th Field Artillery Regiment "Prinz Heinrich von Preußen" in Nuremberg and then with the Royal Bavarian 10th Field Artillery Regiment in Erlangen. He then continued his practical training in Bartenstein, Berlin and Königsberg and passed the second state examination in the spring of 1914. In the meantime, he was awarded a doctorate of both rights by the Friedrich-Alexander University of Erlangen–Nuremberg in 1912.

=== World War I ===
After completing his studies and preparatory service, Zwillenberg was appointed to the civil service as a court assessor. Shortly thereafter, he was forced to enlist as a sergeant with the 8th Field Artillery Regiment at the outbreak of World War I on 1 August 1914, and served throughout the war until he was discharged from Army service on 18 December 1918. During his service he received three military decorations:

- Eisernes Kreuz 2. Klasse (9. April 1916)
- Militärverdienstorden (Bayern) mit Krone und Schwertern (8. Januar 1917)
- Dienstauszeichnung (Bayern) 3. Klasse (22. August 1918)

=== Weimar Republic ===
After serving in the army, he worked for a short time as a judge in Berlin, then moved to the private sector. Engaged to the daughter of the department store entrepreneur Oscar Tietz, he joined Hermann Tietz & Co. as a trainee. Starting as an in-house lawyer, became an authorized signatory shortly thereafter, and became a partner as early as 1919 On 18 November 1919 he married Elise Regina Tietz (born 11 April 1896 in Munich) in Berlin. The couple had two children, Lutz Oscar Tietz (born 9 December 1925 in Berlin-Charlottenburg; died 25 December 2011 in Bern) and Helga Henriette Linde (born 25 February 1930 in Berlin; died 16 January 2013 in Bern). His younger brother-in-law Martin Tietz also became a partner; his older brother-in-law Georg had already become one in 1917. Later, Zwillenberg became an honorary committee member of the Association of German Department Stores and an honorary tax judge. In 1929 he joined the Berlin Society of Friends.

Zwillenberg collected art, including sculptures by the animal sculptor August Gaul, and promoted music within the Gesellschaft der Musikfreunde zu Berlin, which appointed him an honorary member for his significant services to the society on the occasion of its 25th anniversary in January 1933.

=== Nazi era ===
When the Nazis rose to power in 1933, the Tietz family, including Zwillenberg, was persecuted due to their Jewish heritage. The Hermann Tietz company was "Aryanized" in 1933/1934, that is, transferred from Jewish to non-Jewish owners, and Zwillenberg left the company. His two brothers-in-law Georg and Martin Tietz emigrated. Martin fled with his wife to Liechtenstein in 1939 and his assets were seized by the Gestapo.

On 9 November 1938 Zwillenberg was arrested by the Gestapo in his Berlin office during Kristallnacht and taken to the Sachsenhausen concentration camp the next day, from where he was released on 26 November. On 9 March 1939 he emigrated with his family to the Netherlands.

On 10 January 1939 he was appointed Honorary Consul of the Republic of Nicaragua in Rotterdam. There he soon acquired a majority shareholding in N.V. Eerste Nederlandsche Snaren- en Catgutfabriek and took over the management of the company.

After the German occupation of the Netherlands in May 1940, the Zwillenberg family was arrested in Amsterdam on 25 October 1943, and taken to the Westerbork transit camp, where they were interned from 4 November 1943 to 15 March 1944. From March to May 1944, the family was imprisoned in the French internment camp in Vittel and, after a prisoner exchange with the Allies, in North African internment camps of the United Nations Relief and Rehabilitation Administration from June 1944 until the end of the war. The family returned to the Netherlands on 26 August 1945.

=== Post war period ===
Unlike the Tietz brothers, Zwillenberg did not return to Germany after the Nazi defeat, but remained in the Netherlands with his family. From 1945 to 1958 he was Consul General of the Republic of Nicaragua, also Consul General of the Republic of San Marino. In 1964, he and his wife moved to Bern to join their two children who resided there. Hugo Zwillenberg died there on 31 October 1966, his wife Elise on 14 August 1986.

== Literature ==
- Georg Wenzel: Deutscher Wirtschaftsführer. Lebensgänge deutscher Wirtschaftspersönlichkeiten. Ein Nachschlagebuch über 13000 Wirtschaftspersönlichkeiten unserer Zeit. Hanseatische Verlagsanstalt, Hamburg/Berlin/Leipzig 1929, DNB-IDN 948663294, Spalte 2541 f.
- Robert Volz: Reichshandbuch der deutschen Gesellschaft. Das Handbuch der Persönlichkeiten in Wort und Bild. Band 2: L–Z. Deutscher Wirtschaftsverlag, Berlin 1931, DNB-IDN 453960294, S. 2103 (mit Porträtfoto).
- Max Osborn (Red.): Das Kaufhaus des Westens. Berlin 1932, S. 13. (Porträtfoto Zwillenbergs)

== See also ==
- Hermann Tietz
- Aryanization
- The Holocaust
