= Hermann Tietz =

German businessman

- Born: 29 April 1837; Birnbaum an der Warthe, Kingdom of Prussia, German Confederation
- Died: 3 May 1907 (aged 70); Berlin, German Empire
- Occupation: Merchant

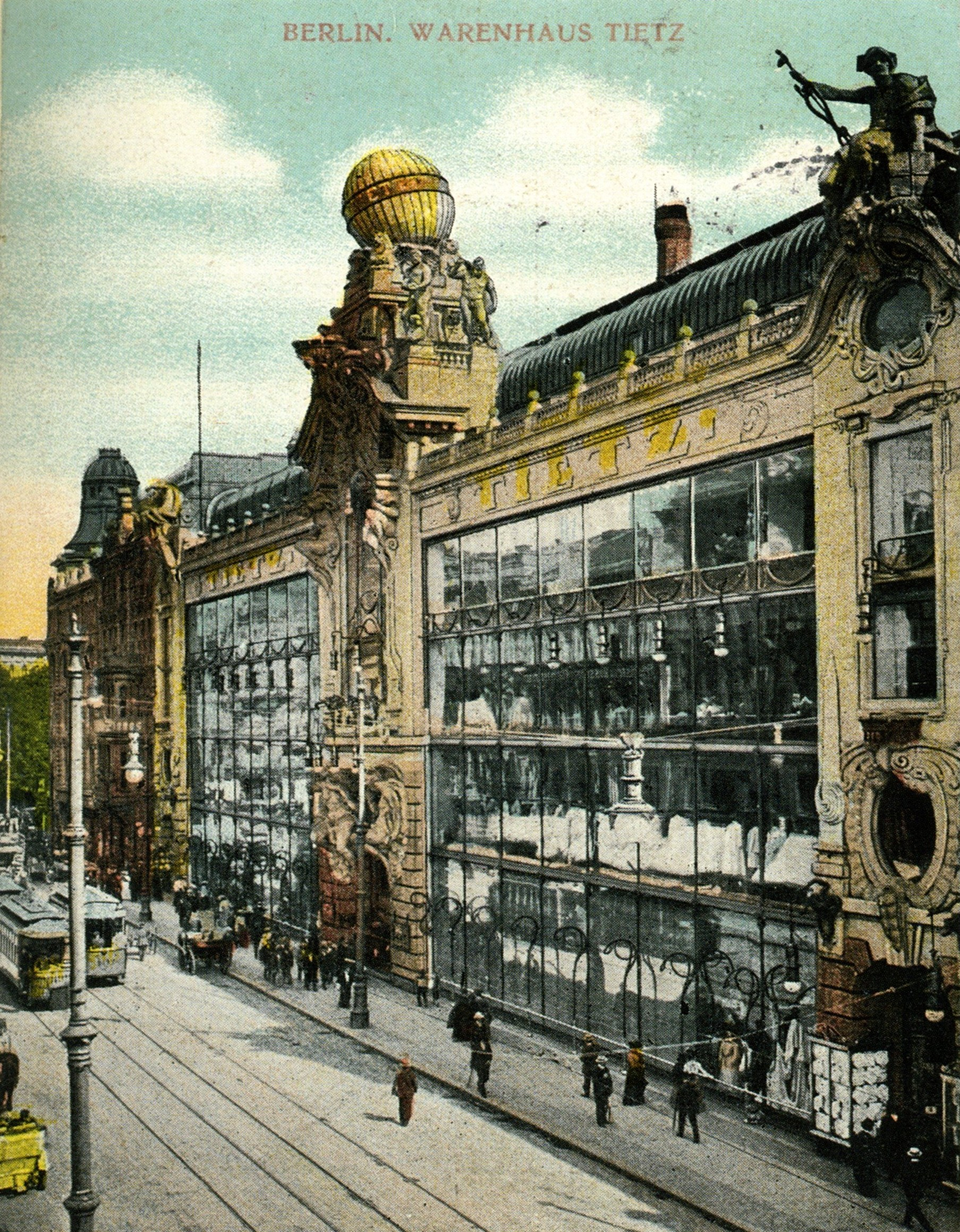
Warenhaus Tietz on Leipziger Straße in Berlin (1900)

Hermann Tietz (born 29 April 1837, in Birnbaum an der Warthe near Posen (today Międzychód, Poland), died on 3 May 1907 in Berlin) was a German-Jewish merchant, co-founder of the Tietz Department Store. He was buried in the Weißensee Cemetery.

== Life ==
Tietz, co-founder of the Tietz Department Store, was the first to carry out the idea of the department store in Germany.

In 1882, the first department store of Tietz was opened in Gera (Thuringia, Germany) by his nephew Oskar Tietz. Oskar's brother Leonhard Tietz later founded his own chain store ("Kaufhof"). After stores in smaller towns like Bamberg, Erfurt, Rostock, Stralsund and Wismar had been successful, Tietz established his first department store in Berlin. In 1900, Herrmann Tietz opened a store in Leipziger Straße, where it was located close to the department store Wertheim, the biggest store in Europe at the time. In 1904, Tietz opened another luxurious store at Alexanderplatz. The impressive and palace-like stores were designed to offer the customers a unique shopping experience. Another example is the Alsterhaus in Hamburg (established in 1912). With ten department stores Tietz was the largest chain in Berlin. In 1927 some 13,000 employees worked in the Tietz department stores.

The Tietz family divided the German market into two spheres of interest. Herrmann and Oscar Tietz concentrated on the South and East, while Leonhard Tietz ("Kaufhof") was active in the West and in Belgium.

When Hermann Tietz died in 1907, the firm was the "largest concern of the kind in Germany".

Oscar Tietz further developed the manufacturing side of the firm, establishing factories, organised in 22 subsidiary companies. During the 50th anniversary celebrations of the Tietz Department Store in 1932, The Jewish Telegraph Agency noted that "the Tietz firm is still a family enterprise, and is conducted at present by Georg and Martin Tietz, the sons of Oscar Tietz, and by his son-in-law, Dr. Hugo Zwillenberg.

== Nazi-era persecution of the Tietz family ==
In the Third Reich, all businesses of the Tietz family were Aryanized (i.e., seized from Jews and transferred to non-Jewish owners) and the family members emigrated. The Tietz department store was Aryanised in 1934.

Oscar's son Martin Tietz migrated with his wife to Liechtenstein in 1939 and his assets were seized by the Gestapo.

In 1933, Georg Karg, the new non-Jewish owner, changed the company’s name to "Hertie Department Stores" as an abbreviation of Hermann Tietz.

Hertie was acquired by its competitor Karstadt in 1994, and the Hertie stores were gradually converted to Karstadt outlets. In 2007, Hertie made a brief comeback. Due to a crisis of the Karstadt department store group, Karstadt dissolved 74 of their stores. These stores were the smallest ones and had been unprofitable at least. The "new" relaunched Hertie department store group re-opened them under the name "Hertie". Today, all former business relations to Karstadt have been severed and Hertie is independent. Hertie had planned to expand, but on 20 May 2009 it was decided that all 54 Hertie department stores were to close.

In 2020, the Hertie Foundation, one of the largest charitable foundations in Germany, was criticised for refusing to publicly address the Nazi past of its founder.

== See also ==
- Aryanization
- Arcandor
- Hertie School
- The Holocaust
- KaDeWe
- Tietz family
- Leonhard Tietz
