= Max Emden =

German chemist and art collector (1874–1940)

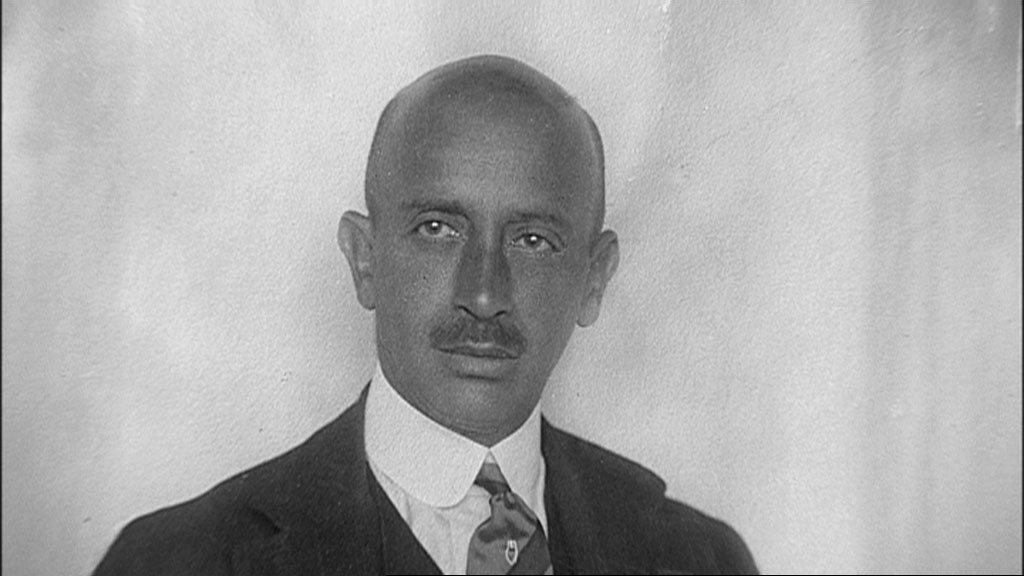
- Max James Emden, c. 1928
- Born: Max James Emden; 28 October 1874; Hamburg, German Empire (now Germany)
- Died: 26 June 1940 (aged 65); Muralto, Switzerland
- Citizenship: Swiss (after 1934); German (until 1934)
- Occupations: Businessman, art collector
- Known for: Owner of the Brissago Islands; Founding of the Max Emden Collection

Max James Emden (28 October 1874 – 26 June 1940) was a German-born Swiss businessman, art collector, heir and bon vivant. He was the owner of the Brissago Islands on Lake Maggiore from 1926 until his death.

Emden primarily collected 19th century of Old Masters as well as French and German painters such as Canaletto, Böcklin, Feuerbach, Liebermann, Courbet, Degas, Gauguin, van Gogh and Monet. Some of Emden's properties, including valuable paintings, have been the object of Nazi-era restitution claims. How his legacy has been handled has sparked a debate in Germany about the erasure of information concerning the Nazi era and inspired films about his life.

== Early life and education ==
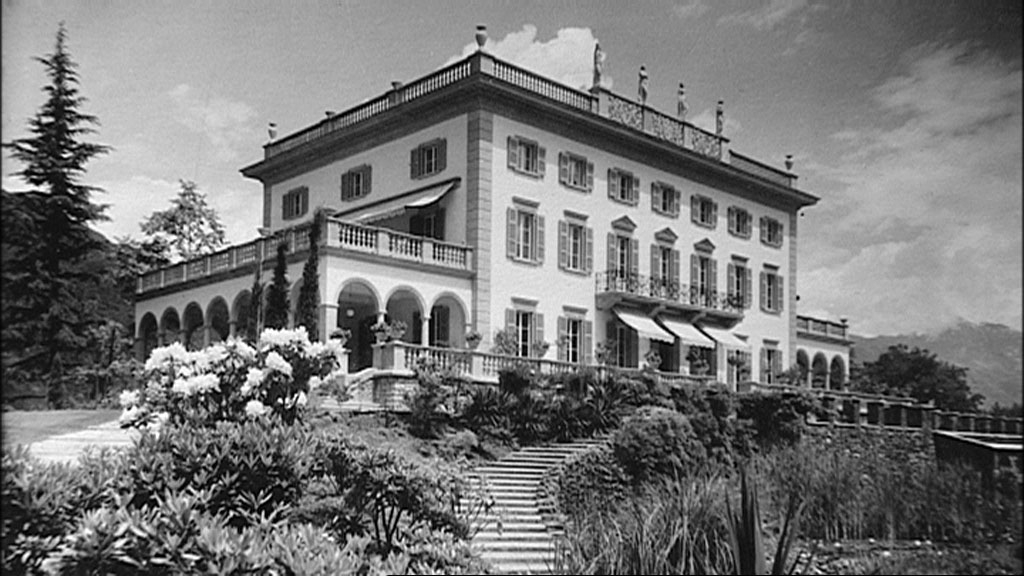
Villa Emden, Brissago Islands, on Lake Maggiore, Switzerland

Emden was born 28 October 1874 in Hamburg, German Empire, the older of two children, of Jakob "Giacomo" Emden (1843–1916), a wealthy merchant and owner of department stores, and Mathilde Emden (née Kann; 1841–1910). He had an older sister, Alice Stéphanie Aboucaya (née Emden; 1873–1968).

The Emden family was a well established Jewish merchant family (named after the city of Emden) which has been settled in Hamburg since the 17th century and were active in the textile industry which would later turn into the department store giant M.J. Emden Söhne (M.J. Emden Sons). His mother hailed from a wealthy banking family from Frankfurt am Main.

Emden graduated from Wilhelm-Gymnasium in Hamburg on 7 September 1893. He then pursued studies in chemistry and mineralogy at the Universities of Heidelberg, Geneva, Zurich and Leipzig earning a Doctor of Philosophy (PhD) in 1898.

== Career ==
Emden fulfilled military duty in 1896/97 serving in the Leib-Husaren-Regiment in Danzig; a cavalry unit in the Prussian Army.

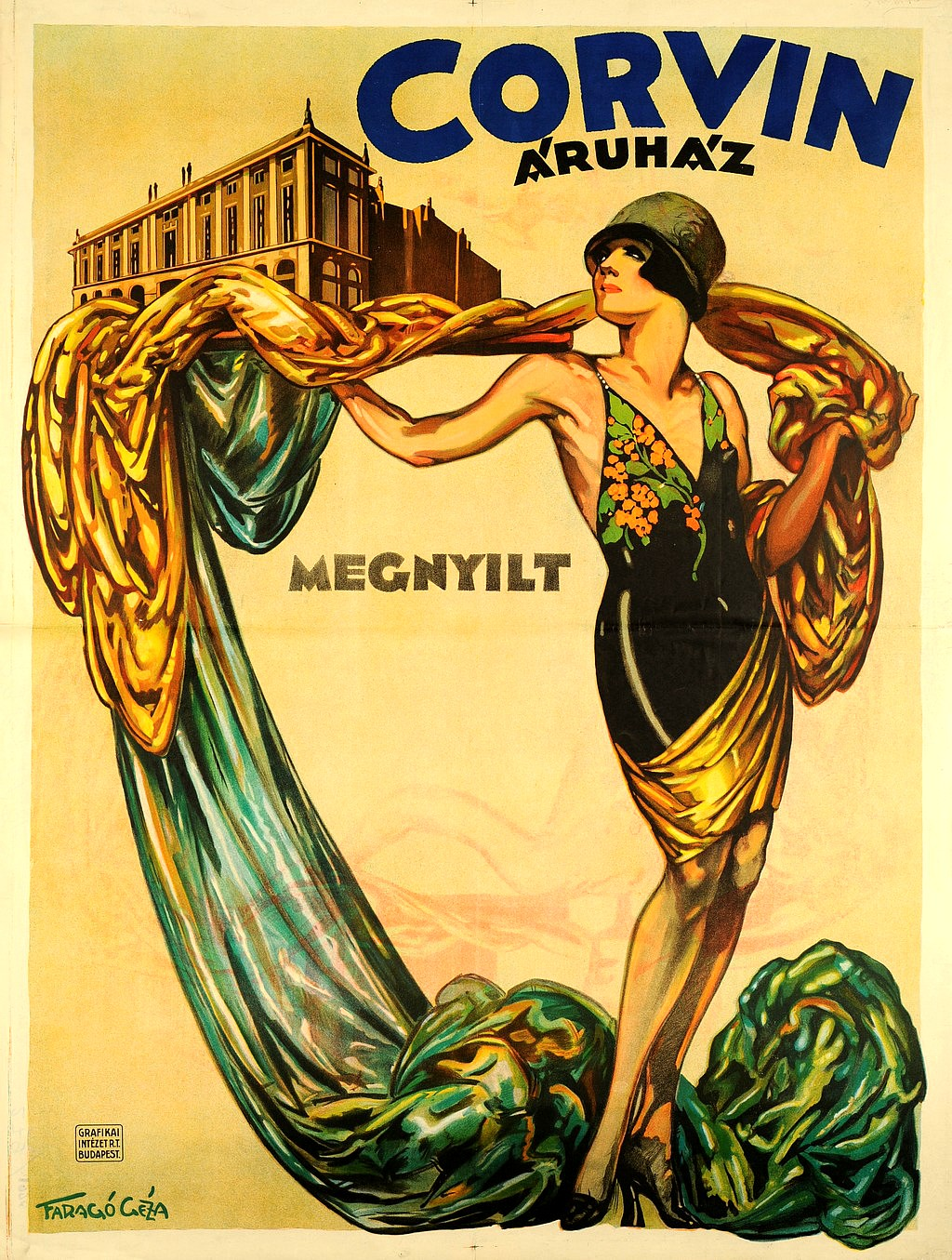
Placard of the Corvin Áruház four-storey department store in Budapest, Hungary, 1926. The Corvin palace-like department store was founded by the Hamburg company M.J. Emden Söhne with a share capital of one million Hungarian korona. Opened on 1 March 1926, it is the oldest department store in Hungary.

Emden worked in the family textile trading company M. J. Emden Söhne becoming a partner in 1904 and later sole owner. Founded in Hamburg in 1823, the company expanded internationally under Emden, becoming a major department store chain. For the stores, Emden acquired plots of land in the centres of German and foreign cities, throughout Europe, in Berlin, Potsdam, Chemnitz, Plauen, Munich, Danzig, Stockholm, Helsinki and Budapest. Well-known department stores Emden was involved in include the KaDeWe, with the main shareholder Adolf Jandorf, the Hungarian Corvin Áruház in Budapest, the Swedish Allas in Stockholm, the Oberpollinger in Munich, the Poetsch in Hamburg and the Petersen department store in Wandsbek.

In 1906 Emden had a country house built by the Hamburg architect Wilhelm Fränkel in Klein Flottbek for 200,000 German mark. Today, the Jenisch-Gymnasium private school is located on the 26,000 m^{2} property.

At the age of almost 50, the internationally successful mercery goods entrepreneur, sold most of his company holdings to the department store group Karstadt (and others) and then withdrew more and more from his commercial activities. From then on, the Hamburg company devoted itself to the administration of the still extensive property holding, and Emden also kept the foreign department stores in its possession. To his friends, Emden said 'I want to start a totally new life!', and he travelled to Ticino, Switzerland. Emden revealed some grounds for this, he and his wife had become estranged, and both had decided to divorce but wanted to remain good friends. There was also another woman in Emden's life, whom he believed would later marry him. Emden's lover, would later reveal that she would never take a Jew for her husband! and the marriage proposal was rejected in 1926. Emden was forlorn and purchased a revolver, and for some months never left home without it. Emden had framed his life for this woman, for her love of nature, he even bought two island's on Lake Maggiore.

=== The Brissago Islands ===
In Ascona, Switzerland, Emden was a guest of Baron Eduard von der Heydt on the retreat Monte Verità. In 1926 Emden acquired the Brissago Islands on Lake Maggiore from the heavily indebted island owner Baroness Antoinette de Saint Léger. Whose late Anglo-Irish aristocratic husband had originally purchased in a deserted state for the sum of 25,000 Swiss francs, a not so cheap price in 1885. The idea, came from Emden's old friend, the famous violinist Bronislaw Huberman, who wanted the smaller of the two islands for himself. But Huberman had to leave, before the negotiations began, on a concert tour to North and South America, Paris, London, and Berlin.

At first, the baroness was prepared to sell the islands to anyone who would pay off her mortgages and other major debts, which amounted to some 500,000 Swiss francs. But upon finding out how wealthy Emden was, the corrupt old baroness increased the property price overnight, incurred new personal debts and engaged local craftsmen to submit false invoices to increase the estate's arrears—with the promise of a cut in the profits, in the end, the islands would cost Emden 1.5 million Swiss francs. Emden paid the sum. But Huberman was exasperated when he heard this. He accused Emden of having betrayed him, and the two old friends quarrelled and never spoke with each other again. But the baroness would continue to create new difficulties for Emden. When Emden finally wanted to move onto the islands, the baroness refused to leave, she almost had to be forced out, and that was only possible when Emden purchased a few houses for her on the banks of Ascona for around 55,000 Swiss francs – she was to live in the largest one herself, and rent out the others.

Shortly after, Emden's first task was to have the island's existing residence blown up, the spectacle saw the baroness's abandoned haul of cellar junk and tattered documents swirling in the light of day, probably for the first time in some forty years. Emden replaced the island's residence with a Palazzo style 24-room villa, finished with a luxurious interior, designed by the Berlin architect Alfred Breslauer. Brought electricity lines and telephone to the island for some 100,000 Swiss francs. Emden had the gardens renewed and the marina expanded with a flotilla of thirteen motorboats. Though surrounded by a picturesque lake, Emden included a 33-meter-long Roman-style bathing pool decorated with the statue The Bathers by the sculptor Georg Wrba. The present botanical garden there, which Emden continued to preserve and maintain, is essentially the work of the previous owner of the Brissago Islands, the Saint Léger family. The female nude by the sculptor Werner Müller comes from the time of Emden. The Javanese by the sculptor Remo Rossi was added in 1950.

=== Aryanization in Nazi Germany ===
In 1931, a major auction appeared in Berlin from the "Dr Max Emden Collection": paintings by German and French masters from the 19th century, furniture, carpets, bronzes, German silver, and faience. The auction was held by art auctioneers Hermann Ball and Paul Graupe in Tiergartenstrasse 4, on Tuesday 9 June 1931 (Issue No. 23, Weltkunst, Berlin, 7 June 1931). The proceeds from this auction, some 262 articles, with a 'report to follow' annotation, was published in the next issue (24) of Weltkunst (Art of the World) in the same month.

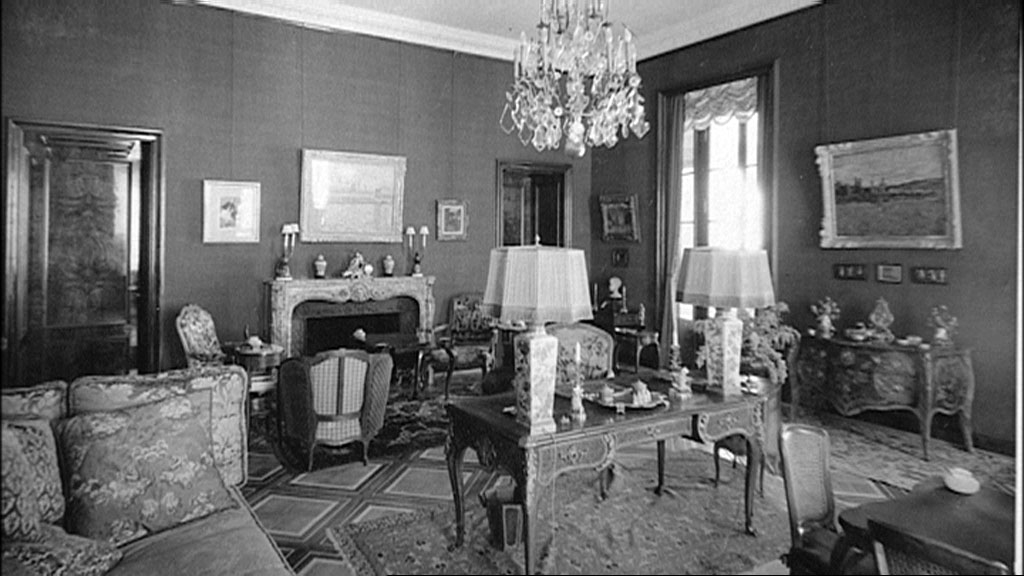
Max Emden's private study in Villa Emden, Brissago Islands, on Lake Maggiore, Switzerland

Persecuted in Nazi Germany because of his Jewish origins, Emden lived mainly on his Brissago Islands in the Swiss canton of Ticino from 1933 and surrounded himself with young women, his devoted girlfriend—the 18-year-old Hamburg-born Brazilian consul's daughter, whom Emden first met in Lugano, and parts of his art collection that had been rescued from Germany. As far as Emden's understanding of art was concerned, he took the view that "life as such" is "an art".

Emden was a passionate golfer and polo player. Thus "Ascona owes the creation of its beautiful golf course" to Emden and von der Heydt's aid. In 1928 Emden had also financed the clubhouse of the Hamburg Golf Club in Hamburg-Rissen "with a generous donation". Up until the 1930s, Emden also owned the premises of the Hamburger Polo Club in Klein Flottbek, which he had to sell to the city of Altona in 1935 for a low price.

In 1930, the Russian painter Baroness Marianne von Werefkin, who was living in Ascona at the time, refused to sell Emden a painting through Emden's middleman, despite her poverty, to show that "There are still artists who respect their work but don't jump after every bite like hungry dogs [...] Emden thinks that you can buy everything, he scorns people and artists, because they, like hungry dogs, camp around him. [...] better, if I beg from poor fellows like myself."

In 1934 Emden acquired the Swiss civil rights (Bürgerrecht) from the municipality of Ronco sopra Ascona, which is adjacent to the Brissago Islands, but could not secure the same for his son Hans Erich. On his island residence, Emden was visited by numerous celebrities, such as Aga Khan III, the King of Siam Ananda Mahidol, members of the German nobility, the international best-seller novelist and good friend Erich Maria Remarque, including annually Emden's ex-wife and her entourage—who had remarried and was now Countess Einsiedel; the countess' visits were a sensation for Ascona, as the beautiful woman completely ignored the fact that one never got dressed properly there.

Due to economic misfortune, triggered by the measures taken against Emden's assets in Nazi Germany, forced sales and the "Aryanization" of land and parts of his business, Emden began selling the works of art he had brought to Switzerland from 1938, including several paintings by the Venetian Bernardo Bellotto, which went to Adolf Hitler's collection, two of which were in possession of the Federal Republic of Germany for a long time and were only restituted to Emden's descendants in 2019. This includes the oil painting Der Zwingergraben in Dresden (The Moat of the Zwinger in Dresden).

== Honours ==
On 18 July 2014, a path along the botanical garden in Hamburg Klein Flottbek was named after Max Emden. The hiking trail runs between Hemmingstedter Weg and Hesten, between the botanical garden and the polo field. The application for naming the path contained the justification: "The path leads right through the former property of Max Emden, which he 'voluntarily' sold to the city of Hamburg in 1935." The central committee of the Altona district assembly approved the application, pointing out that Max Emden "had to sell his property to the city of Altona for a small price in 1935".

== The legacy of Max Emden ==
After the sudden death of Max Emden in June 1940, his only son, Hans Erich Emden, became the sole heir to his father's fortune. The inheritance included the archipelago of the Brissago Islands on Lake Maggiore, which became orphaned and neglected from 1941 when Emden's son, branded and deported from Germany as a "first-degree hybrid Jew" and could neither secure permanent Swiss residence in 1940, eventually managed to emigrate to his mother's birthplace Chile. Travelling from Switzerland on a Chilean laissez-passer issued in Budapest and embarking from Lisbon carrying, in addition, a purchased Haitian passport issued in Geneva, Emden's son was able to transit South America and be naturalised locally in Chile. In South America, Emden's son would later meet his future second wife Ximena, who came from a wealthy family and was able to help him start a new life. Emden's son had several famous paintings in this context, e.g. Van Gogh's Garden in Arles, as well as Renoir, Monet and others, returned to the care of Swiss art dealers, who under unclear circumstances sold the works of art to various collectors, including the German-Swiss arms manufacturer Emil Georg Bührle.

After the Second World War, Emden's son returned to the Brissago Islands but discovered that some of the furniture had been stolen and several works of art were missing. Emden's son had to give up the Brissago Islands after the Second World War and sold them to the canton of Ticino and the surrounding communities in 1949 for around 600,000 Swiss francs. The canton made the islands publicly accessible in 1950. German Chancellor Konrad Adenauer was on the Brissago Islands in the 1950s and found the view of Ascona "one of the most beautiful in Europe".

== The Nazi era ==
Of Jewish origins, Emden had converted to Christianity in his youth, but the Nazis persecuted him as a Jew. Interviewed in The Times of Israel, Juan Carlos Emden (grandson) described his grandfather's situation: "The Nazis financially ruined him, forcing him to sell his stores and real estate. By 1937 he had run out of money and started selling his art collection."

== Art collection: claims, lawsuits and restitutions ==
The fate of property that belonged to Emden before the rise of the Nazis, including paintings from his collection that ended up in German museums, has been the subject of debate in Germany. The German weekly Der Spiegel questioned in a 2017 article about Max Emden "whether people in this country have ever really taken the commitment to reparation and also to the establishment of the truth seriously".

Several claims for Nazi-looted art and forced sales have been filed. Artists concerned include Bellotto, Canaletto and Monet among others.

On 26 March 2019 Germany's Advisory Commission on the Return of Cultural Property Seized as a Result of Nazi Persecution announced that, in the case of Dr Max James Emden vs. the Federal Republic of Germany, it recommended that the paintings "The Moat of the Zwinger in Dresden" and the "Karlskirche in Vienna" (both by Bernardo Bellotto) be restituted to the heirs of Dr Max James Emden. The two artworks were currently in the possession of the German government. In its decision, the Commission stated: "The systematic destruction of people's economic livelihoods by the Third Reich as a tool of National Socialist racial policy (and precursor to the Final Solution) thus also applied in the case of Max Emden.".

Another painting from the Emden collection, Le Palais Ducal (1908) by Claude Monet valued at more than $30m, was alleged by Emden's heir to have been sold under duress to Swiss art dealer Walter Feilchenfeldt during the Second World War.

In 2006, the National Gallery of Victoria (NGV) rejected an Emden claim for Lady with a Fan, by Gerard ter Borch. In October 2025, the NGV quietly restituted the painting to the heirs of Henry and Hertha Bromberg, for whom Emden had hidden the property.

In 2021 the Monuments Men Foundation announced that it had located a painting from the Emden collection by Bernardo Bellotto called "The Marketplace at Pirna" in the Museum of Fine Arts, Houston (MFAH) with an inaccurate provenance that concealed the history of the painting. After the MFAH refused to restitute the painting the Emden heirs filed a lawsuit in the Southern District of Texas.

== Personal life ==
In 1910, Emden married the Chilean-born Concordia Gertrud Hélène Anna "Anita" Sternberg (1888–1973), a daughter of Emilio Sternberg and Margaretha Sternberg (née Andersen), of Valparaíso. Emden's wife held a social class of friends from the aristocracy and both belonged to the best social circles in Hamburg. They had one son;

- Hans Erich "Enrique" Emden (1911–2001), married to Maria Ximena Blumer (1914–2013), who fled to Chile after World War II, after becoming stateless on a Haitian passport, later being granted Chilean nationality through his mother. His son, Juan Carlos Emden, pledged for restitution of key pieces of the Emden Collection.

The Emden's were divorced in 1926. Anita subsequently married secondly on 3 December 1927 in Munich, Germany to Adolkar von Einsiedel, Graf von Einsiedel (1889–1963).

Emden died on 26 June 1940 in Muralto, Switzerland aged 65. His remaining largely diminished estate was valued at approximately $408,163 (or 1.8 million Swiss Francs).

== Publications ==
- Über die Reduktionsprodukte der Phenylglyoxyldicarbonsäure. Inaugural-Dissertation der Hohen Philosophischen Fakultät der Universität Leipzig zur Erlangung der Doktorwürde. Druck von Metzger & Wittig, Leipzig 1898 (nicht im Katalog der Deutschen Nationalbibliothek enthalten).
- Hamburger Baukunst. Hamburg, November 1909 (nicht im Katalog der Deutschen Nationalbibliothek enthalten). (Digitalisat Universitätsbibliothek Hamburg)
- Der natürliche Arbeitstag : eine Rechenaufgabe. (Digitalisat Universitätsbibliothek Hamburg)

== Film ==
On 10 April 2019, the documentary film Life is an Art – The Max Emden Case premiered in Hamburg. The film works on the story of Max Emden and depicts the heirs' lavish struggle for restitution and justice against the authorities and private art collectors. Numerous experts comment on the subject of looted art and the works of art that were in the possession of Max Emden.

== Literature ==
- Ulrich Brömmling: Max Emden. Hamburger Kaufmann, Kaufhauserfinder, Ästhet und Mäzen. (Reihe: Mäzene für Wissenschaft, Neue Folge; Bd. 1). Wallstein, Göttingen 2020, ISBN 9783835337510.
- Ulrike Knöfel: Für ein Opfer zu mondän. In: Der Spiegel 38, 2017; online unter dem Titel Das Schicksal des Kaufhauskönigs Emden (noch nicht verlinkbar).
- Robert Landmann: Ascona – Monte Verità. Auf der Suche nach dem Paradies. Schultz, Berlin 1930; Huber, Frauenfeld 2000, ISBN 3719312194.
- Ulrich Luckhardt, Uwe M. Schneede: Private Schätze. Über das Sammeln von Kunst in Hamburg bis 1933. Ausstellungskatalog. Hamburg 2001.
- Giuseppe Mondada: Die Brissago-Inseln in Vergangenheit und Gegenwart. Dadò, Brissago 1975.
- Eberhard Mros: Die Brissago-Inseln und ihre Umgebung im launischen Spiel der Zeiten. E. Mros, Ascona 2011, ISBN 9783952340219.
- Curt Riess: Ascona. Geschichte des seltsamsten Dorfes der Welt. Europa Verlag, Zürich 1964, Munich 2021 ISBN 9783958903951
- Birgit Schwarz: Hitlers Museum. Böhlau, Wien 2004, ISBN 3-205-77054-4.
- Michael Sontheimer, Andreas Wassermann: Moral und Millionen. In: Der Spiegel. Nr. 45, 2006 (online – über die Kunstsammlung Emden).
- Carlo Speziali: 1885 – 1950 – 1985. Le isole di Brissago. Brissago 1985, speziell S. 48 ff.
- Francesco Welti: Der Kaufhaus-König und die Schöne im Tessin. Max Emden und die Brissago-Inseln. Huber, Frauenfeld 2010, ISBN 9783719315511.
- Ursula von Wiese: Vogel Phönix. Stationen meines Lebens. Klio, Bern 1994, ISBN 3-906635-02-3. (Autobiographie).
- Die Sammlung Dr. Max Emden. Auktion bei Ball-Graupe, Berlin, 9 June 1931 (Auktionskatalog); Universität Heidelberg (Digitalisat).

== See also ==
- List of claims for restitution of Nazi-looted art
- Lempertz
- The Holocaust
- Nazi plunder
- Aryanization
