= Brissago Islands =

Swiss islands on Lake Maggiore

Coordinates: 46°08′00″N 8°44′06″E

Native name: Isole di Brissago
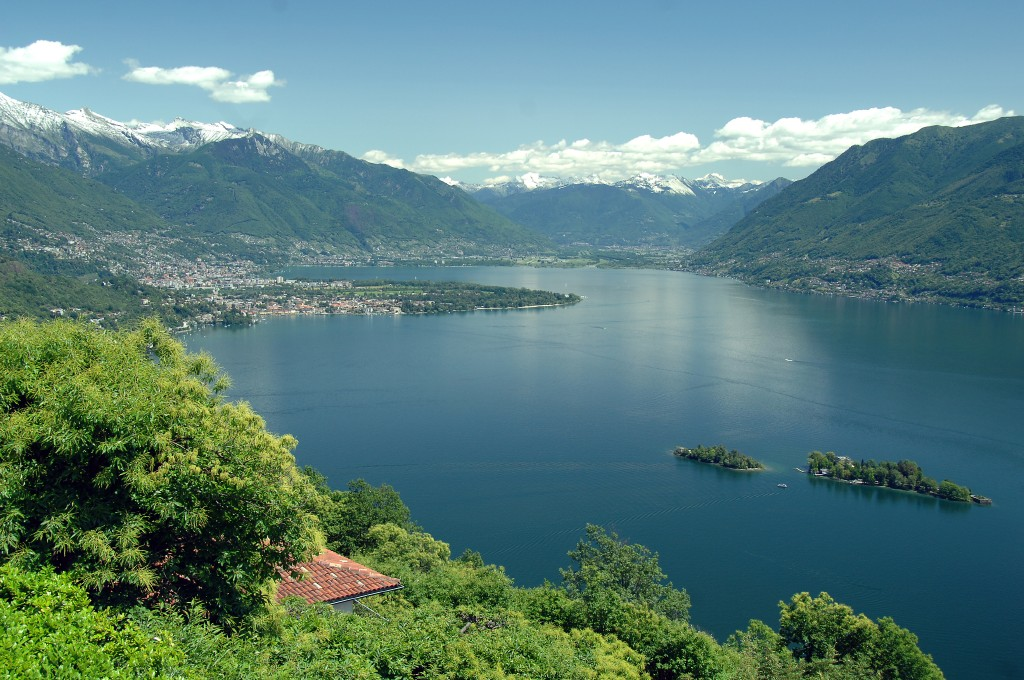
- Aerial view of the Brissago Islands

Geography
- Location: Lake Maggiore
- Archipelago: Brissago Islands
- Total islands: 2
- Major islands: San Pancrazio; Sant’Apollinare
- Highest elevation: 200 m (700 ft)

Administration
- Switzerland
- Canton: Ticino
- District: Locarno
- Comune: Brissago

Demographics
- Population: 0

The Brissago Islands (Italian: Isole di Brissago) are a group of two islands located in the Swiss part of Lake Maggiore close to Ronco sopra Ascona and Brissago. Both islands belong to the district of Locarno, in the canton of Ticino.

San Pancrazio (also known as Grande Isola) is larger and is well known for its botanical garden. On the smaller island, known as Isolino, Isola Piccola or Isola di Sant’Apollinare, the vegetation is allowed to develop naturally. Both benefit from the mild climate provided by the lake. The minimum distance from the shore is 1,040 metres for San Pancrazio and 930 metres for Sant'Apollinare, making them the farthest islands from the shore in Switzerland. Both islands culminate at 200 metres above sea level or 7 metres above lake level (193 m).

== History ==
Roman remains have been found on San Pancrazio. The islands were used as a refuge by early Christians. In the thirteenth century nuns of the Humiliati order built a monastery on San Pancrazio, while the local parish also built around this time the Church of S. Pancrazio. After the suppression of the Humiliati in 1571 by Pope Pius V, the order's property was given to the hospital in Locarno and the islands became uninhabited.

=== St. Leger ===
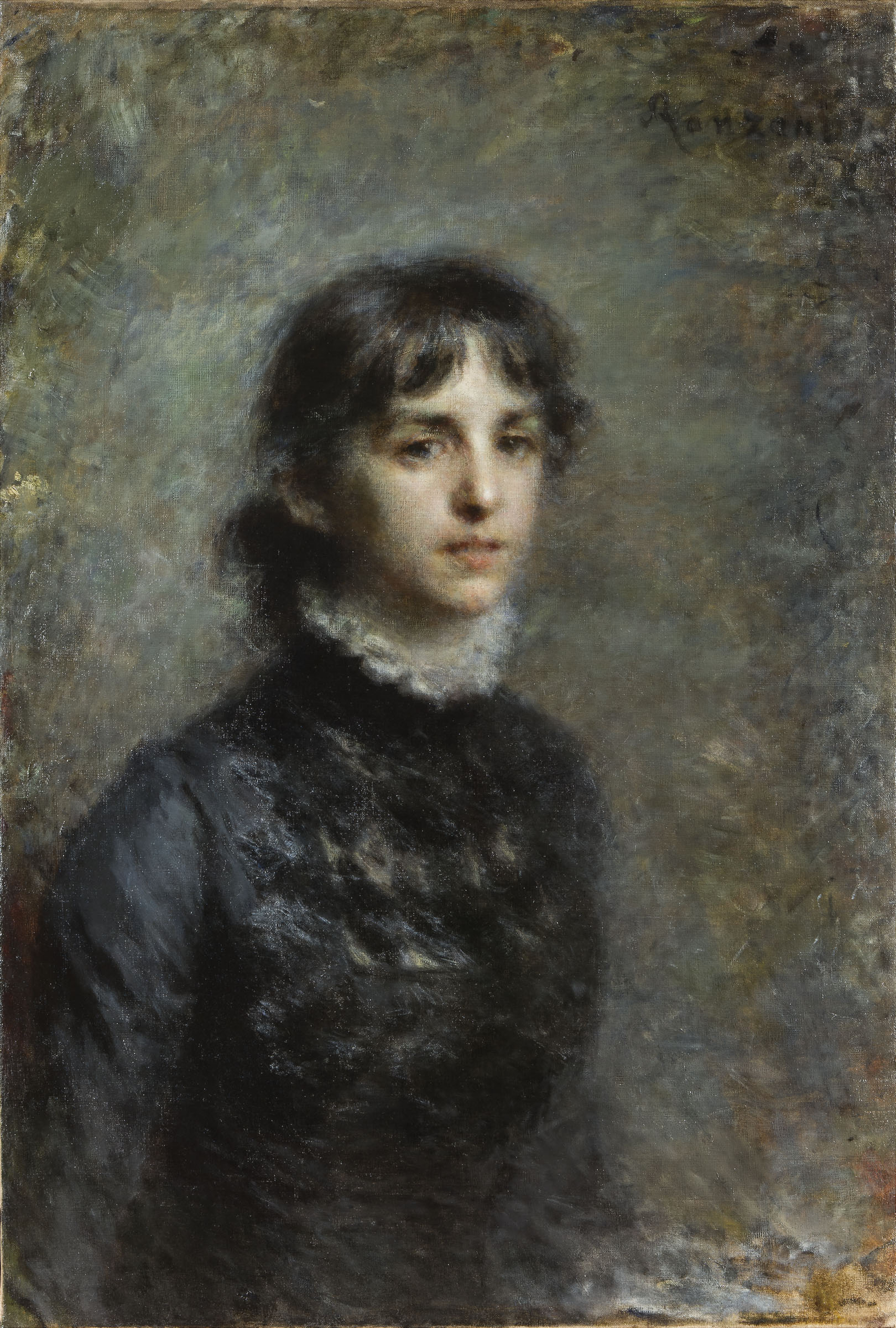
Baroness Antoinette de Saint Léger portrayed by Daniele Ranzoni, 1886

In 1885 an Anglo-Irishman of the aristocratic Saint Leger family, Richard Fleming, and his Saint Petersburg-born wife Antoinette (née Bayer, 1856 to 1948) purchased the Brissago Islands with a family legacy inherited by Fleming. The Brissago Islands at the time were deserted, covered with vegetation and the remains of an old convent once used by sectarian nuns. Fleming's wife had already gravitated to Italy and had frequented the lakes for health reasons before her marriage to Fleming. She is believed to be an illegitimate daughter of Tsar Alexander II, and as Antoinette Bayer, is said to have been ordered to leave Russia on 48 hours' notice. The tales of who she was or where she came from, no one who knew her is certain, other than her father must have been wealthy to send his daughter off with a governate to Naples for health rehabilitation and to learn Italian, where she would later first marry the German consul in Naples.

On San Pancrazio island, Fleming renovated the convent into a home and his wife began to create a botanical garden, which required bringing by boat to the island earth, plants from around the world and gardeners. Fleming, reportedly finding his wife too impetuous, left the island in 1897 for Naples, where he worked as a diplomat at the British consulate, he died in 1922. Her daughter had also left the island, escaping with a gardener’s assistance in a boat. Antoinette remained and continued to develop the botanical garden park, and her island residence became a centre of intense cultural and business activities.

Between 1886 and 1914, Baroness Antoinette de Saint Léger (as she called herself after her husband inherited the title from one of his uncles) hosted on the island the painters Daniele Ranzoni, Filippo Franzoni and Giovanni Segantini and the composer Ruggero Leoncavallo. After World War I, she also hosted Rainer Maria Rilke and Harry Graf Kessler. In 1919, the Irish writer James Joyce, who at the time was working on his novel Ulysses, visited the island and stayed at the baroness' residence; Joyce who was staying in nearby Locarno, made contact having learned that the baroness, aged 63, had scrolls on her walls painted with scenes from the Odyssey.

After the First World War, Antoinette became deeply in debt due to failed business ventures and high-risk investments to which she was prone and even began to engage in smuggling between Italy and Switzerland, where her islands became the ideal base. Finding herself in a precarious debt situation she was forced to sell the islands in 1926. She moved first to Ascona and then to Intragna, where she lived a somewhat destitute life until her death, on 24 January 1948.

=== Max Emden ===
In 1926, Hamburg department store magnate Max Emden purchased the islands, demolished the existing house and replaced it with a Palazzo style villa, designed by the Berlin architect Alfred Breslauer. The villa had 24 rooms, a conservatory and a 33-metre-long Roman-style bathing pool. While not interested in botany and gardening, Emden preserved the existing garden and vegetation, undertaking the necessary maintenance. Emden continued the baroness's exotic partying, entertaining young ladies who would water-ski and dance naked in the garden. Emden lived on the islands until his death in a clinic in Locarno in 1940.

=== Purchase by the public ===
In 1949, Emden's son Hans Erich, who had emigrated to Chile accepted an offer from a consortium consisting of the Canton Ticino, the municipalities of Ascona, Brissago and Ronco sopra Ascona, plus the Swiss Nature Protection League (known today as the Swiss Heritage Society) to purchase the islands. The purchase agreement was signed on 2 September 1949.

On the morning of 2 April 1950 the Brissago Islands were opened to the public.

== Parco botanico del Canton Ticino ==
While the smaller island has been left in its natural state, the botanical garden (Parco botanico del Canton Ticino) on San Pancrazio is home to approximately 1,500 plant species, among which are azaleas, rhododendrons, Japanese palm trees, numerous camellias, Japanese banana, bamboo, magnolia, agaves, cypress, yucca, California poppies. The garden today covers 2.5 hectares and receives more than 90,000 visitors a year.

Today the villa contains a restaurant and the administration offices of the Botanical Park of Canton Ticino.

The Brissago Islands are part of the Gardens of Switzerland network.

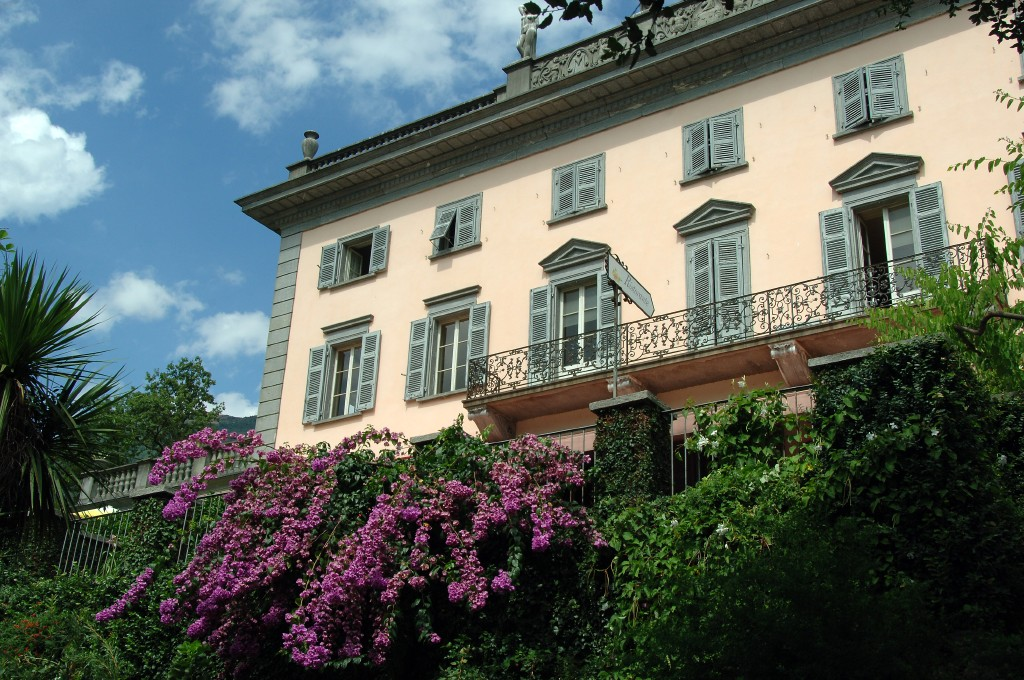
Villa

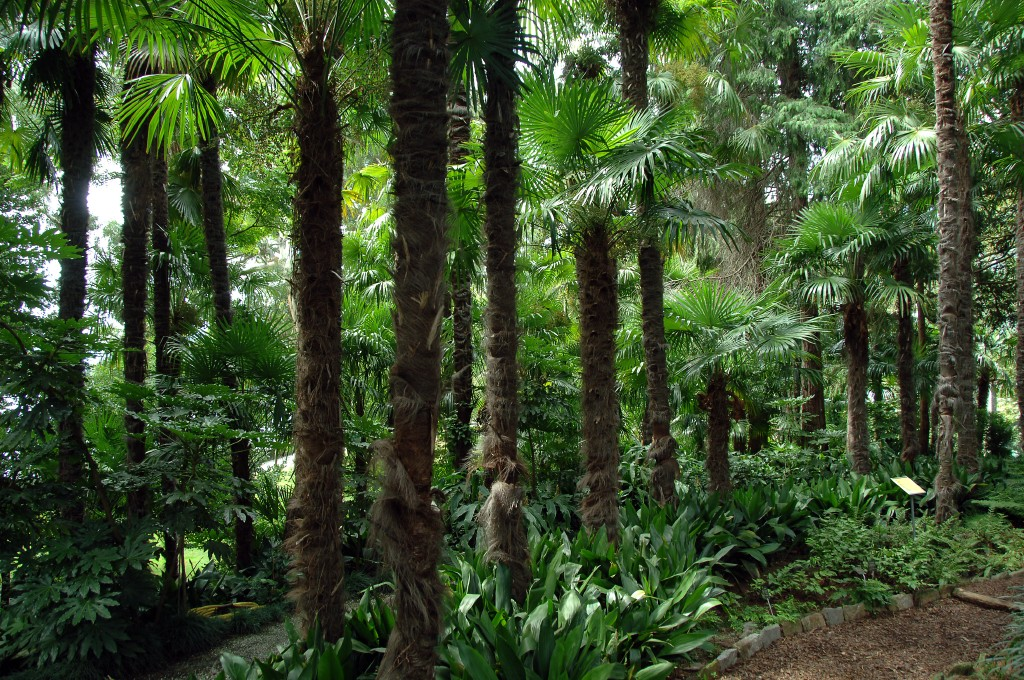
Botanical garden

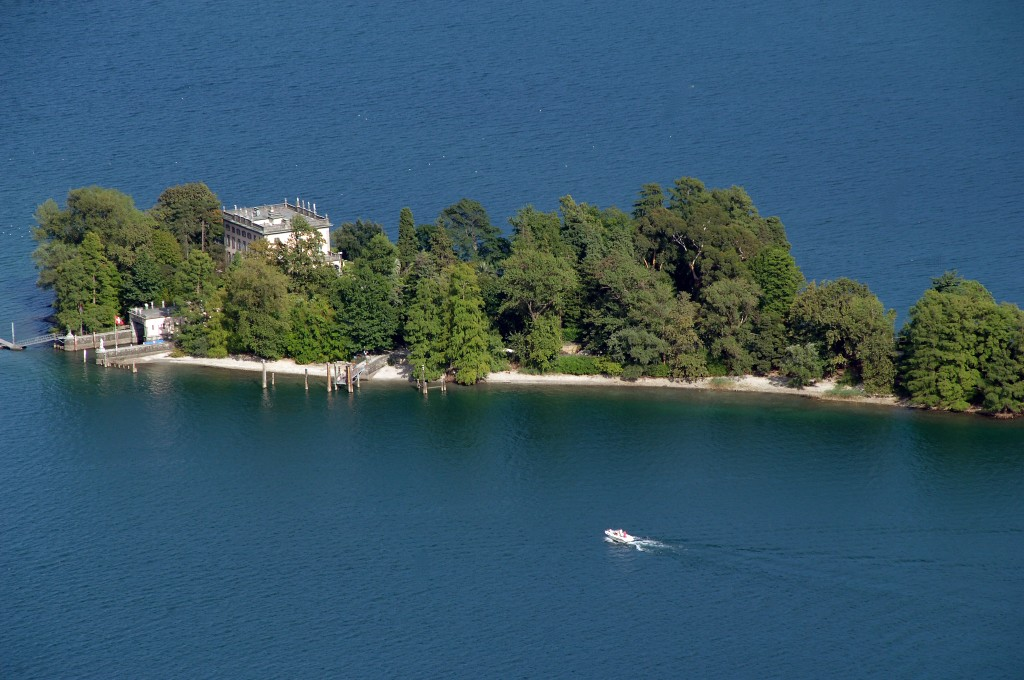
Grande Isola

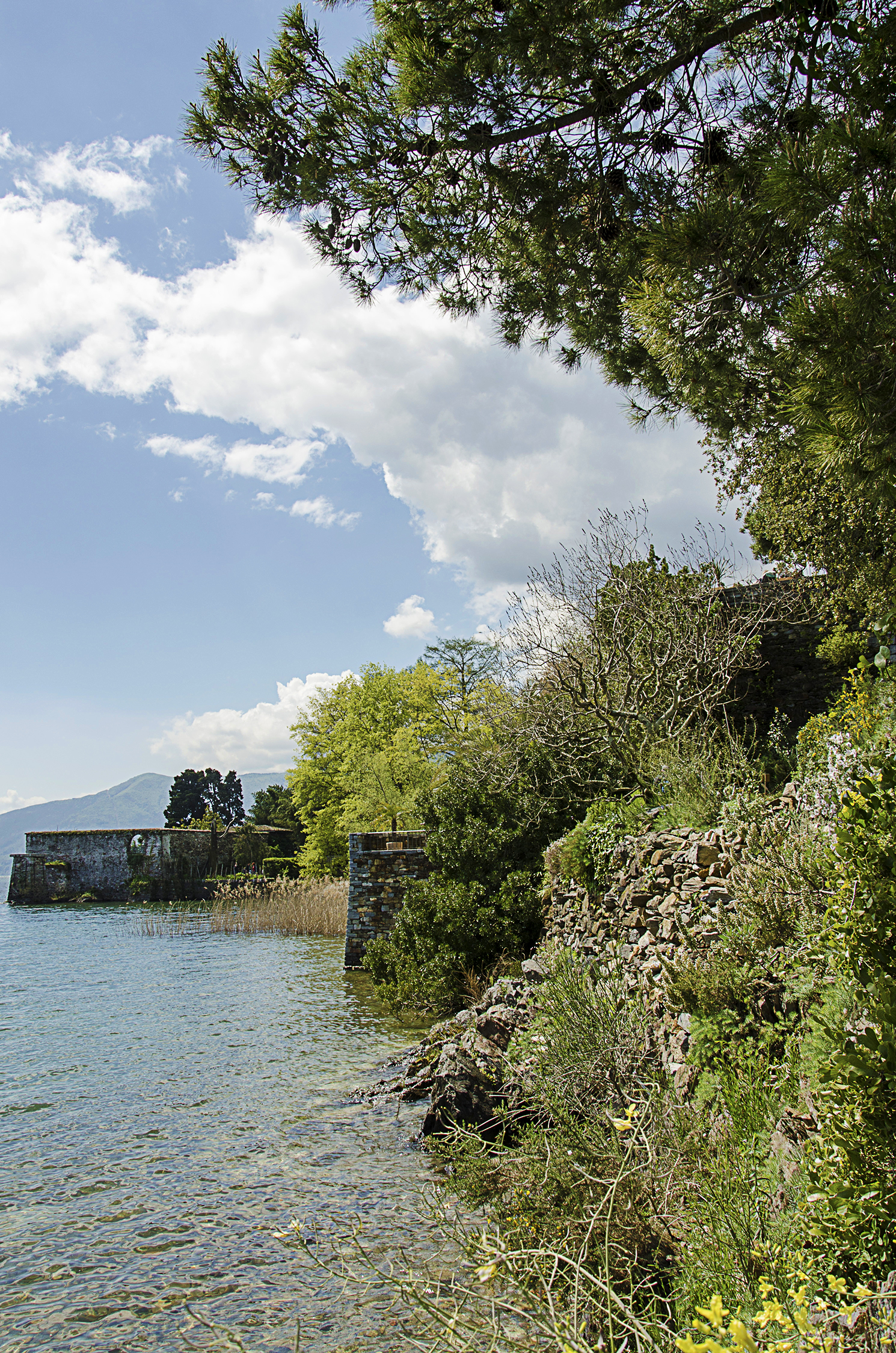
Isola Grande, east side

== See also ==
- List of islands of Switzerland
