= Alfred Breslauer =

German architect (1866–1954)

Alfred Breslauer (23 June 1866 – 19 March 1954) was a German architect of Jewish origin.

== Life ==
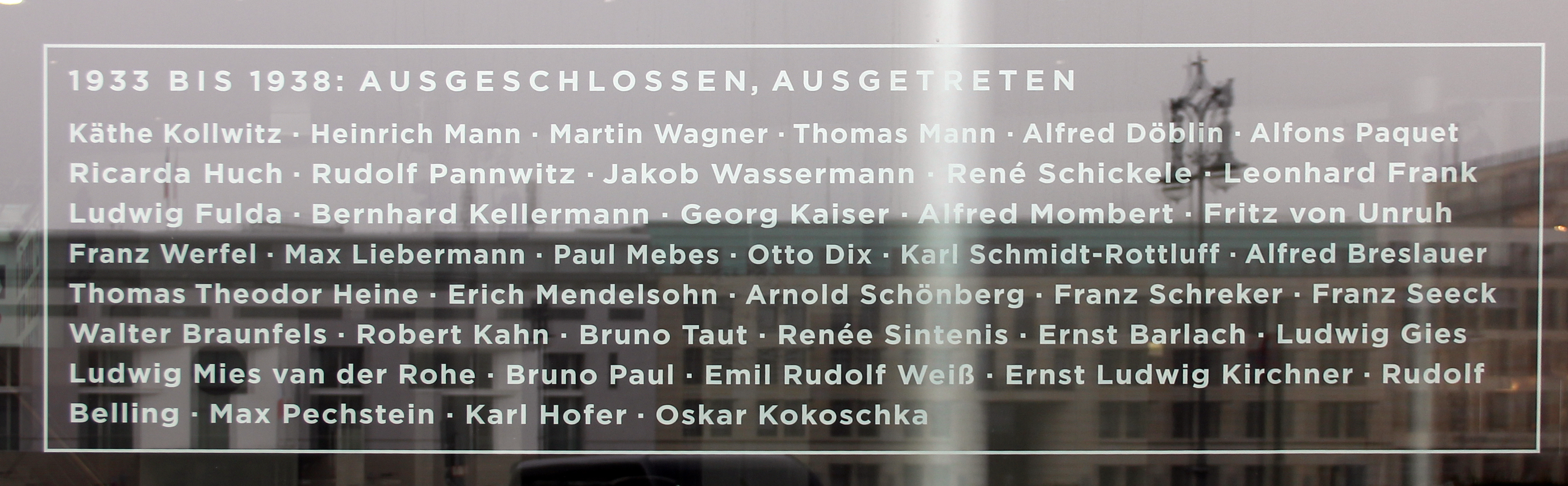
Memorial plaque at the house Pariser Platz 4 in Berlin-Mitte

Breslauer was born in Berlin and studied architecture at the Technische Hochschule Charlottenburg. During his studies he became a member of the Akademischer Verein Motiv. After his studies, he initially worked as a trainee architect and assessor in the Prussian civil service, including in the Prussian Ministry of Public Works in Berlin. In 1897 he left the civil service and became an employee of the well-known architect Alfred Messel.

From 1901 to 1934 he worked independently with the architect Paul Salinger - his brother-in-law.

In 1921 Breslauer was appointed as a member of the Prussian Academy of Arts. On 9 December 1933 he was expelled from the Academy by the Nazis because of his Jewish ancestry. In 1939, he emigrated to Switzerland.

Breslauer was married to Dorothea Lessing, a daughter of the art historian Julius Lessing. Their joint daughter was the photographer and art dealer Marianne Breslauer (1909-2001).

His eldest daughter was Agathe Saulmann who was died in Zurich.

The exclusion was reversed in November 1945 following the defeat of Nazi Germany.

== Work ==
=== Buildings ===
Buildings designed by Breslauer can still be found in large numbers in Berlin, some of which are listed as historic monuments.

Built in 1903 and 1904 by Breslauer and Salinger, the R. M. Maaßen department store on Oranienplatz in Berlin-Kreuzberg was, according to the company's self-description, Germany's "largest specialty store for women's clothing." It was altered in 1938, badly damaged during the war and completely rebuilt in the 1950s. From 2002 to 2004, the house was renovated, approximating its original appearance.

In 1905, the architects Breslauer and Salinger built a five-story private clinic in Berlin-Tiergarten for the physician Ernst Unger. Today, the building bears the name Haus Unger.

The villa for the banker Carl Joerger on Lake Pohlesee in Berlin-Wannsee, also built by Breslauer and Salinger from 1906 to 1907, is also a listed building and is used as a youth education center WannseeForum.

More buildings

- 1898: Commercial building for the "Polnische Apotheke" (Polish Pharmacy), Friedrichstraße 153a in Berlin-Mitte which is under preservation of cultural heritage (Denkmalschutz) in Germany
- 1900–1901: Country house Friedrich-Engels-Straße 5 in Berlin-Niederschönhausen (under Denkmalschutz)

(from 1901 in the architects studio of Breslauer and Salinger)

- 1901: Two-Family Residential Row "Rote Häuser" (Red Houses) in Berlin-Gesundbrunnen, Prinzenallee 46a–46h (on behalf of Hugo Heimann, individual houses then owned by Karl Liebknecht, Paul Singer and other SPD local politicians)
- 1906: Villa Hoffmannstraße 11 in Berlin-Treptow (under Denkmalschutz)
- 1907–1908: Commercial building "Friedländer", Unter den Linden 67 in Berlin-Mitte (under Denkmalschutz)
- 1907–1908: Country house Cimbernstraße 36 in Berlin-Nikolassee (under Denkmalschutz)
- 1912–1913: Country house Katharinenhof in Gransee
- 1913: Country house Selchow for Paul Mankiewitz in Storkow (Mark)
- 1913–1914: Villa for the banker Fritz Andreae, after 1945 named Villa Paicos, Kronberger Straße 7–9 in Berlin-Grunewald (with garden area under Denkmalschutz)
- 1921-1923: Palacete Kochentaler. Madrid C/ Hermanos Becquer 3.
- 1928: Villa Emden for department store magnate Max Emden, Brissago Islands on Lake Maggiore, Switzerland
- 1928: Villa Griegstraße 5/7 in Berlin-Grunewald (today the Kuwaiti Embassy)
- 1928–1930: Mansion on the estate Bärenklau, named "Schloss Bärenklau" (Chateau Bear's Claw)
- 1931: Villa Bellerive in Zürich (today ZAZ-Bellerive, Zurich Architecture Center)
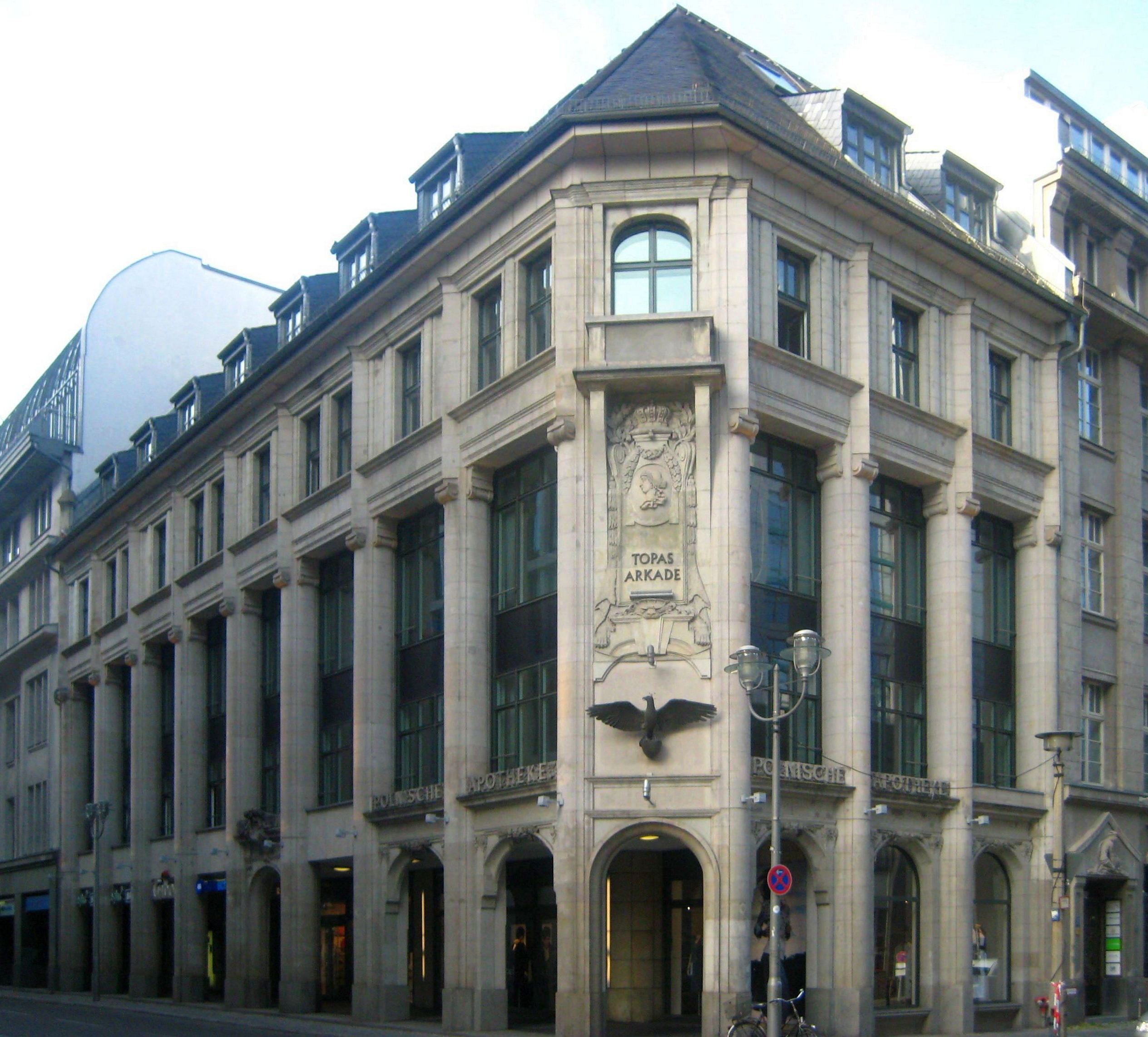
Polnische Apotheke

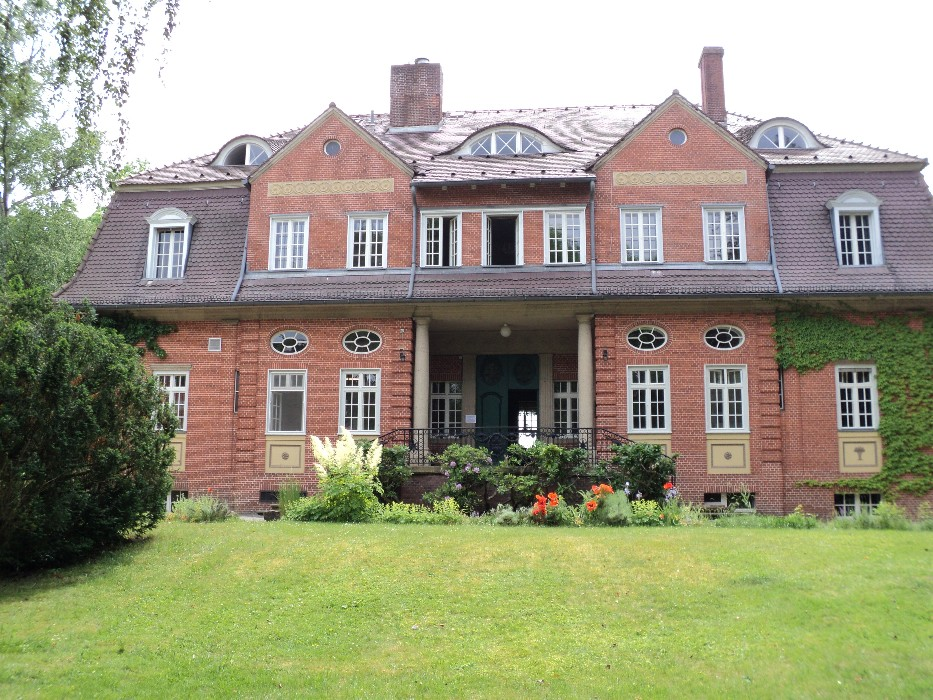
Wannseeforum

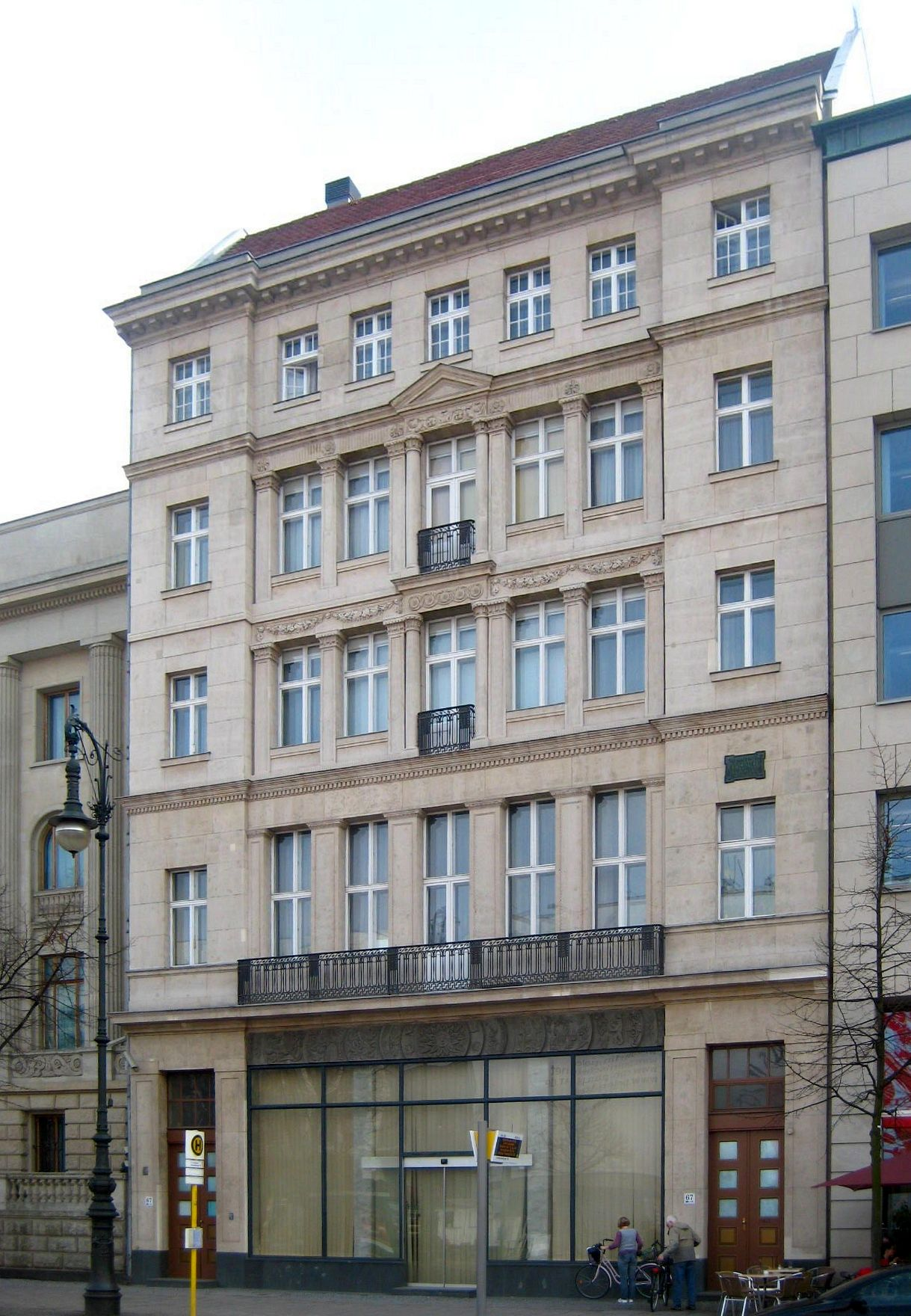
Geschäftshaus Friedlaender

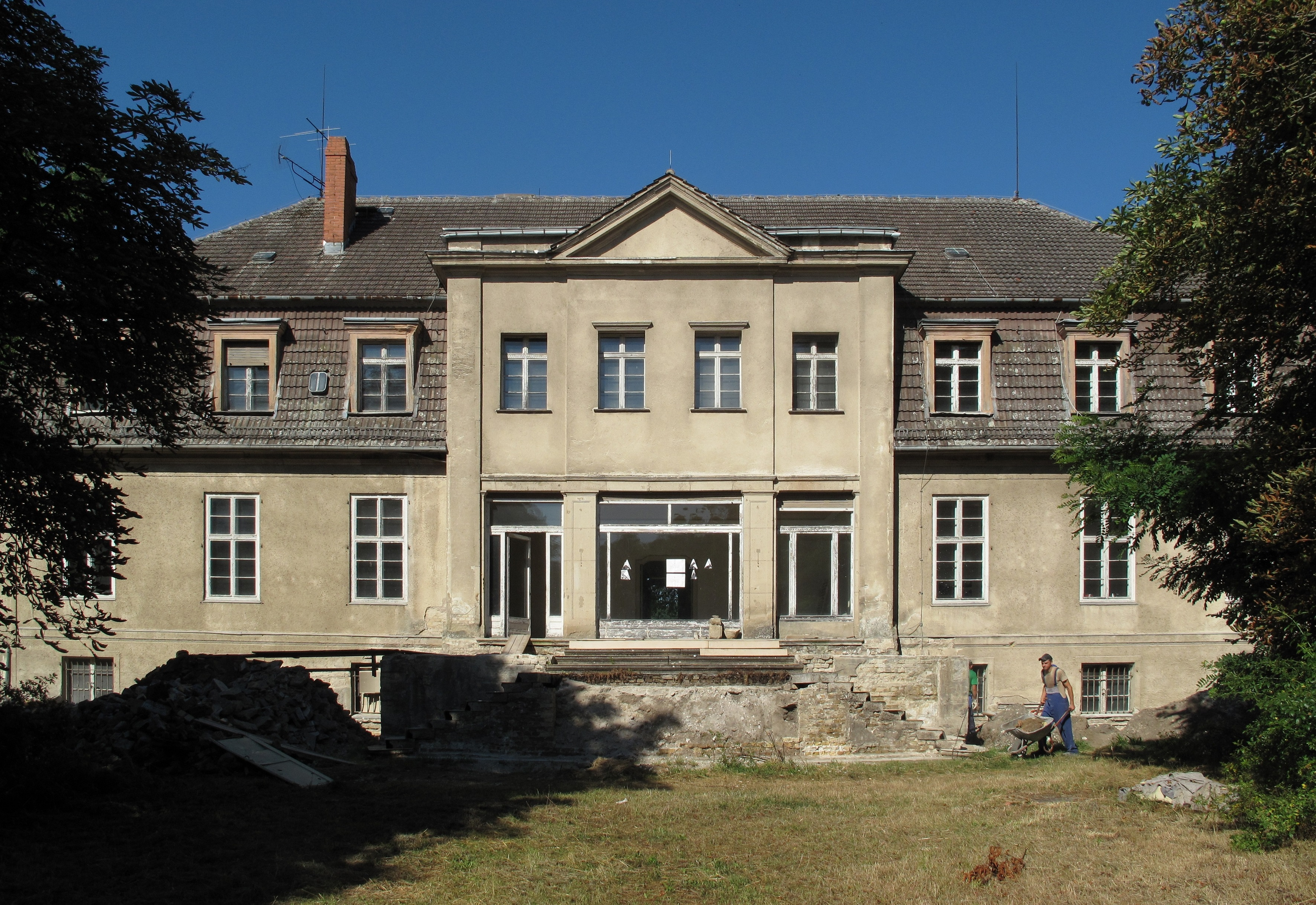
Landhaus Selchow, Storkow

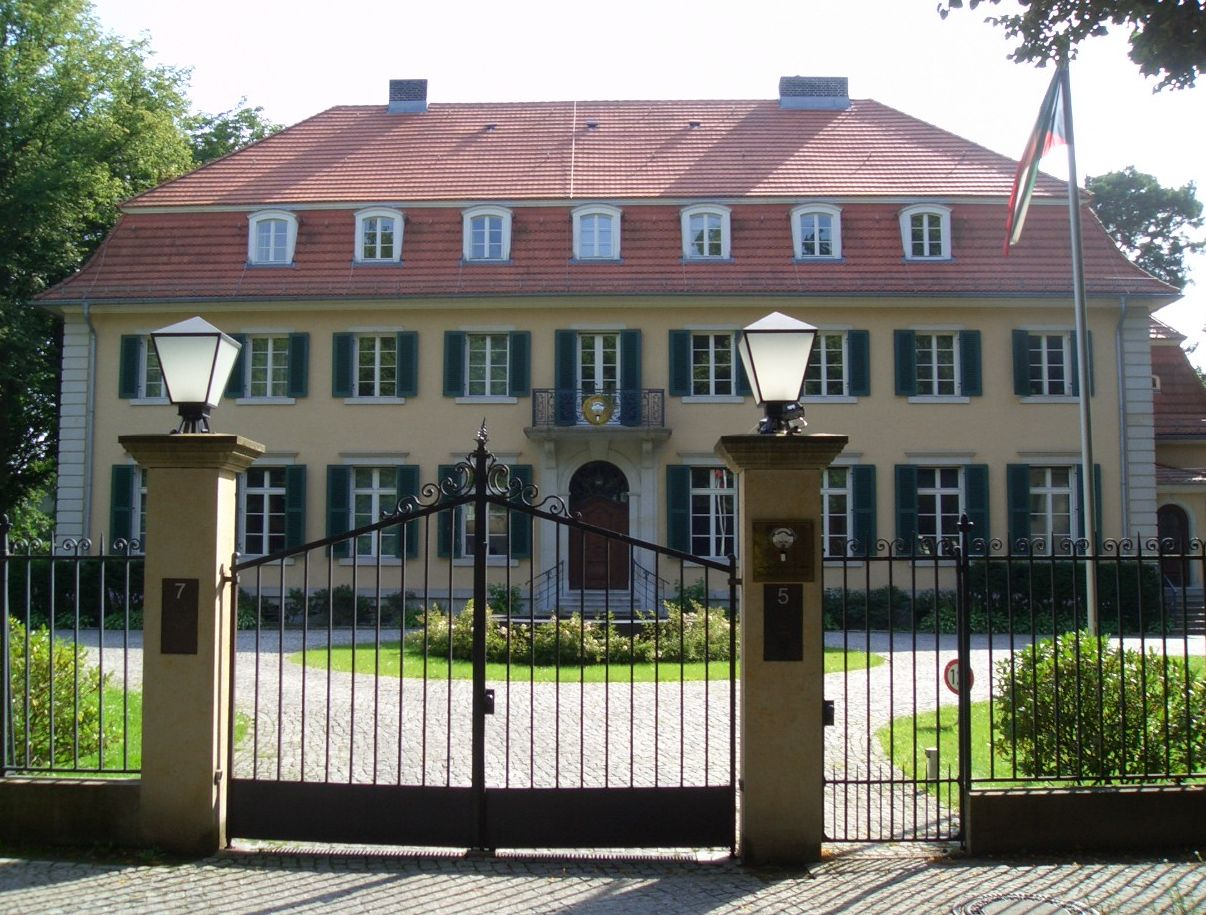
Kuwaiti Embassy

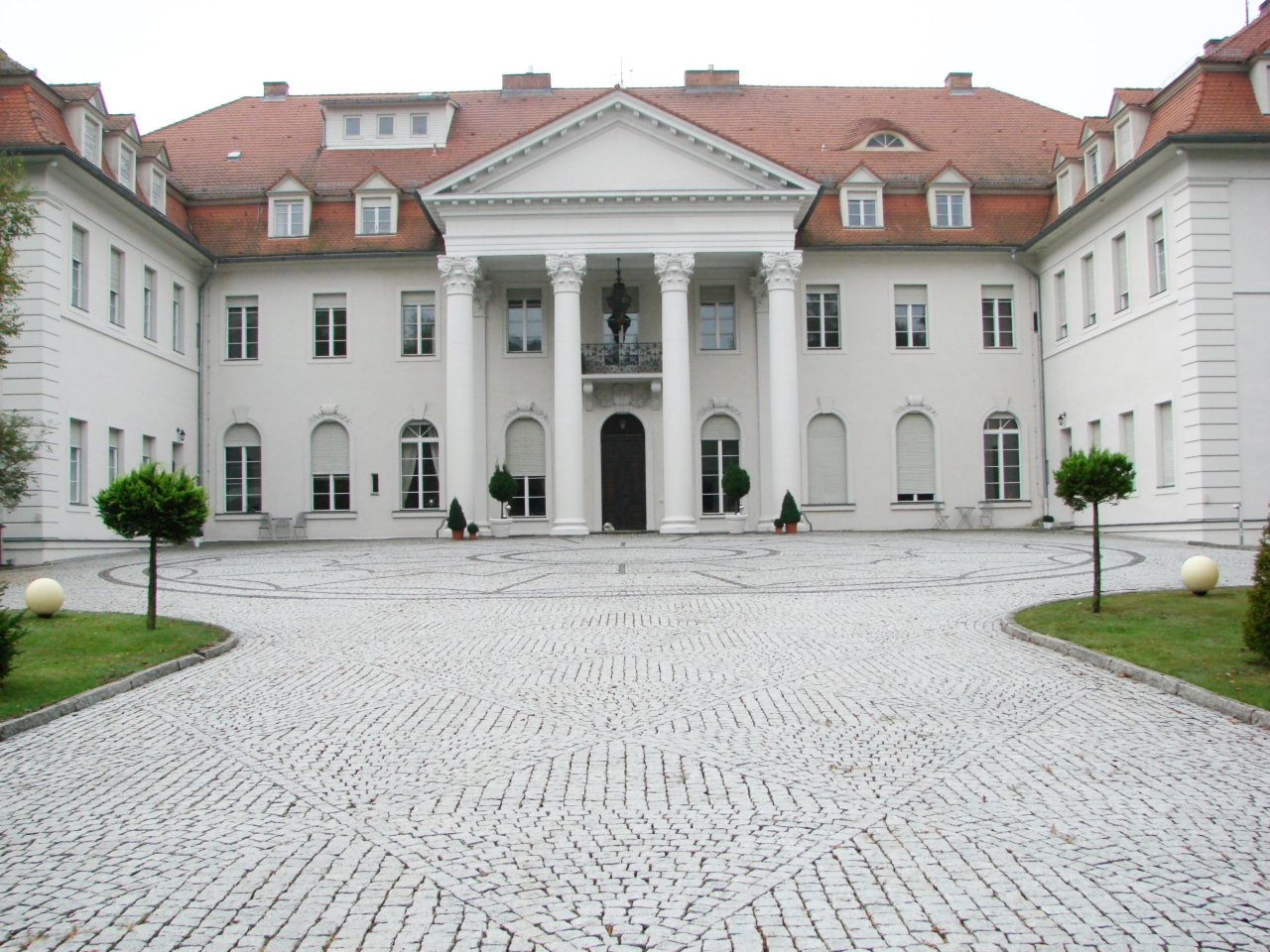
„Schloss Bärenklau“

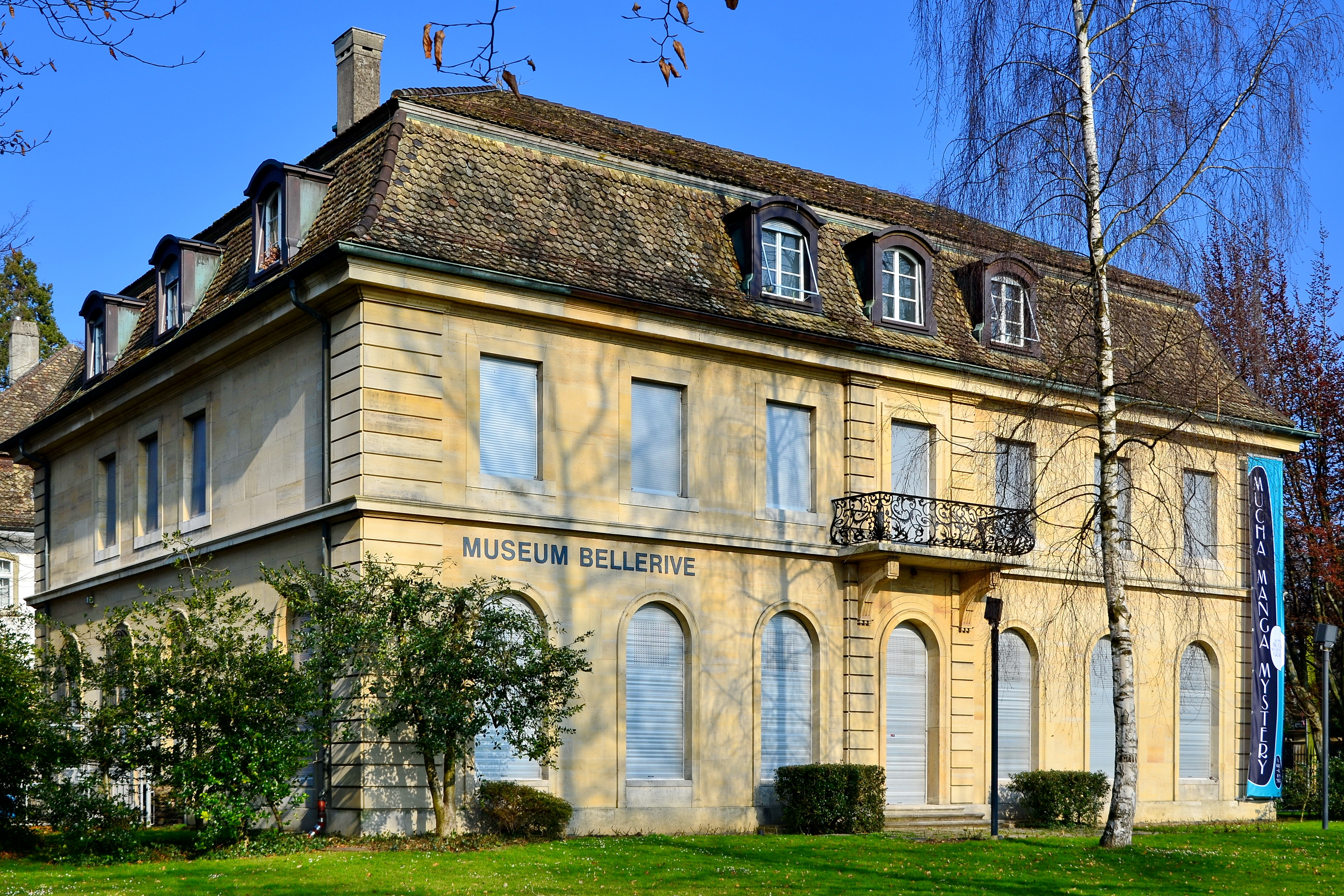
Villa Bellerive

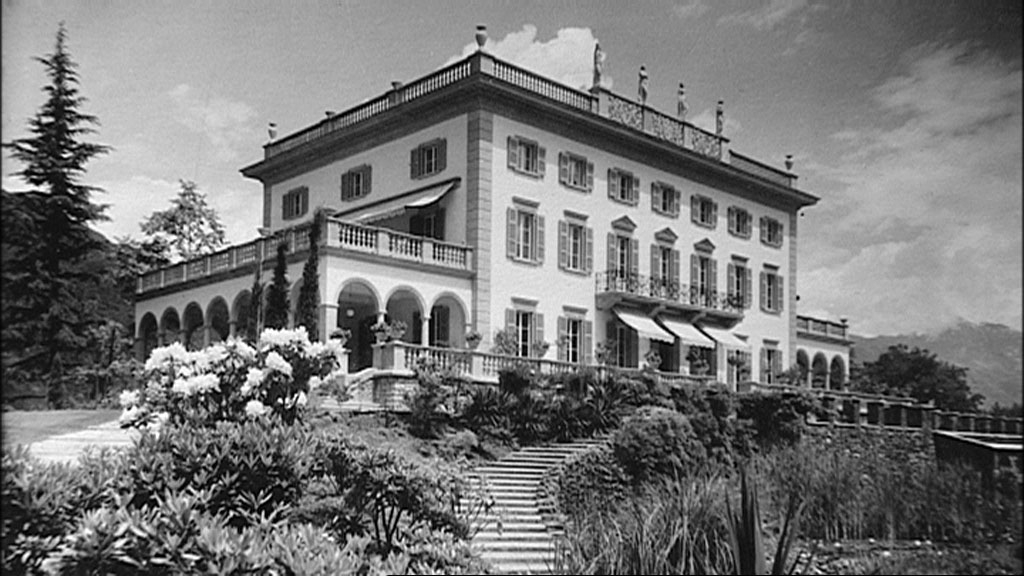
Villa Emden, Brissago Islands on Lake Maggiore, Switzerland

=== Publications ===
- Ausgeführte Bauten 1897–1927. Julius Bard, Berlin 1927

== Literature ==
- Reichshandbuch der deutschen Gesellschaft – Das Handbuch der Persönlichkeiten in Wort und Bild. Erster Band, Deutscher Wirtschaftsverlag, Berlin 1930, ISBN 3-598-30664-4
- Hans Vollmer: Breslauer, Alfred. In: Ulrich Thieme, Felix Becker (Hrsg.): Allgemeines Lexikon der Bildenden Künstler von der Antike bis zur Gegenwart. Begründet von Ulrich Thieme und Felix Becker. Band 4: Bida–Brevoort. Wilhelm Engelmann, Leipzig 1910, S. 586 (Textarchiv – Internet Archive)
