= Agathe Saulmann =

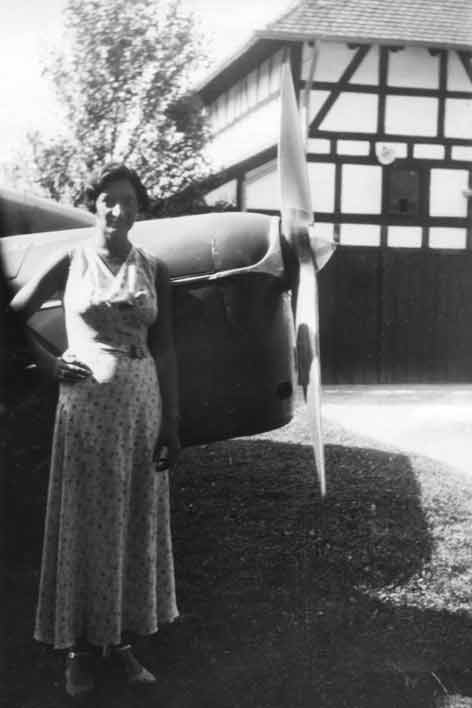
- Agathe Saulmann with her plane at Erlenhof, circa 1930
- Occupation: Art collectors
- Agathe Saulmann
- Born: Ida Agathe Breslauer; February 8, 1898; Berlin, Germany
- Died: June 18, 1951 (aged 53); Baden-Baden, Germany
- Ernst Saulmann
- Born: May 26, 1881; Germany
- Died: April 1946 (aged 64); Paris, France

Agathe Saulmann (February 8, 1898, in Berlin as Ida Agathe Breslauer – June 18, 1951, in Baden-Baden) was a German-Jewish art collector. She and her husband Ernst Saulmann (May 26, 1881 – April 1946 in Paris) were victims of persecution under the Nazis.

== Life ==
=== Early years ===
Ida Agathe Breslauer was born in Berlin as the eldest daughter of the architect Alfred Breslauer. Her sister was the photographer Marianne Breslauer. At the age of seventeen, she married Hendrik Jan de Marez Oijens, a Dutch classical philologist, in Berlin-Dahlem. Their daughter Alma Carolina Frederica, called Nina, was born in The Hague in 1916. Breslauer soon separated from De Marez Oijens, began working in Berlin, and raised her daughter alone. In 1926, she married textile merchant and factory owner Ernst Saulmann and moved with him to Baden-Württemberg. Ten-year-old Nina de Marez Oijens grew up partly with her father in the Netherlands. In her autobiography Bilder meines Lebens (Pictures of My Life), Marianne Breslauer wrote of Saulmann that he was "an extraordinarily cultivated, successful man" who also possessed "a great sense of wit and comedy." Her sister characterized her as a "highly ornamental and distinguished being“.

Ernst Saulmann was the managing partner of the Eningen Mechanical Cotton Weaving Mill, which his father, Franz Saulmann, had founded as a limited liability company with Richard Einstein and Otto Massenbach in 1895 and which was the livelihood for a large part of the working families in the community of Eningen unter Achalm until the 1930s. In 1927, Agathe and Ernst Saulmann acquired from Louis Laiblin the "Erlenhof" estate on the outskirts of Pfullingen, which had previously served as an artists' colony and had been designed and built by the architect Theodor Fischer in 1904. They gradually furnished it with late Gothic sculptures, Renaissance paintings, 18th-century furniture, historic majolica vessels and other handicraft pieces.

Agathe Saulmann was one of the few female pilots in the Weimar Republic. She obtained her sport pilot's license in 1931 and owned a Klemm light aircraft. She had a private takeoff and landing field built next to her home. Flying was considered an extravagant hobby for a woman and in the rural environment she also attracted attention with her appearance: she liked to wear pants and smoke a pipe. In 1932, she planned a flight to Constantinople; an airplane accident thwarted her plans..

At the beginning of the 1930s, Saulmann's company ran into difficulties due to the recession caused by the Great Depression.

=== Nazi era: Flight and expropriation ===
After Adolf Hitler came to power in 1933, Jews were persecuted in Germany as part of the Nazi policy. After the adoption of the "Nuremberg Race Laws" of September 1935, which disenfranchised and discriminated against all Jews in Germany, the Nazi district leader of Reutlingen, Otto Sponer, incited the employees of the cotton weaving mill against Saulmann. Agathe and Ernst Saulmann fled to Florence, Italy on December 28, 1935.

A few days before their escape, Agathe Saulmann wrote to the Munich art dealer Julius Harry Böhler: "We are currently in the process of selling our factory and dissolving our household. Would you possibly be interested in selling our collection?“

In 1935, they fled to Florence, Italy. Under Italian fascism, various press organs, such as the anti-Semitic journal La difesa della razza, fomented anti-Jewish sentiment beginning in 1936. Beginning in September 1938, the government under Mussolini implemented a number of anti-semitic racial laws. Agathe and Ernst Saulmann fled to Nice in southern France in 1938. During World War II, they were interned by the Vichy regime at Camp de Gurs in the Pyrenees. Before deportation to an extermination camp, they managed to escape.

In 1936, Böhler proposed the Munich auction house Adolf Weinmüller for the auction. A member of the Nazi party, Böhler concealed the fact that he himself had been a 50 percent silent partner in Weinmüller since February 1, 1936. The auction proceeds of the collection yielded 40,000 Reichsmark, but the Saulmanns did not receive any of the money. Since the tax office in Reutlingen had determined a Reichsfluchtsteuer (a special tax on Jewish assets) in the amount of 139,365 Reichsmark, the Saulmanns had to cede the proceeds in full. Saulmann's business was forcibly auctioned off and "Aryanized" on March 11, 1937, as were the couple's estate and private land holdings. The buyer of the cotton weaving mill was Josef Leger, previously technical plant manager at Saulmann. Agathe Saulmann's plane had already been confiscated in 1933. .

After the liberation they came to Paris, where Ernst Saulmann died in April 1946 of debilitation as a result of the camp imprisonment. Agathe Saulmann received French citizenship. According to the report of Felix de Marez Oyens, her daughter Nina survived in Switzerland, where her father took her when the Wehrmacht occupied the Netherlands in 1940.

== Restitution ==
Agathe Saulmann filed a complaint with the Restitution Chamber of the Regional Court of Tübingen on May 15, 1948, demanding restitution of her property. She achieved the restitution of the "Erlenhof" estate and returned there in the summer of 1949. However, the entire inventory had disappeared. On March 9, 1950, the Tübingen Restitution Chamber declared the sales contracts concluded in 1937 between the liquidator of Saulmann's cotton weaving mill and the buyer null and void and demanded the restitution of the company together with its real estate. The lawsuit caused a stir far beyond Württemberg. In appeal proceedings, Agathe Saulmann renounced her shares in the company in return for a settlement of 100,000 D-marks and moved to Baden-Baden. On June 18, 1951, she took her own life.

Agathe Saulmann's daughter, Nina de Marez Oyens, took up her mother's restitution claims and researched the art collection until the 1960s. In response to her 1962 inquiry at the auction house of Rudolf Neumeister, who had acquired Weinmüller's auction house in the late 1950s, she was told that all records had been burned during the war. In March 2013, Katrin Stoll, Neumeister's daughter and successor, found Weinmüller's auction catalogs from the Nazi era in the cellar with all the auctioneer's entries. She handed them over to the Central Institute for Art History in Munich for processing and online publication. Now, through the illustrations of some objects in the Weinmüller catalog of 1936, it was possible to identify and find works of art that clearly came from the "Erlenhof": the Franconian alabaster sculpture of a Mother of God in the Liebieghaus Skulpturensammlung; the group of figures made of lime wood "Three Angels with the Christ Child", created around 1430/1340 in the circle of the Ulm painter-sculptor Hans Multscher, in the Bode-Museum and a Renaissance chest in the Landesmuseum Münster. After restitution to the community of heirs, the museums bought back the works permanently.

However, the whereabouts of most of Agathe and Ernst Saulmann's collection, including art from their villa in Florence, is unknown.

In 2023, the French state restituted two paintings to the Saulmann heirs, painting by the Florentine school15th century, Battle scene: Siege of Carthage by Scipio Aemilianus (MNR 246, deposited in Angers), cassone panel, and a 15th-century painting by the 15th century, Virgin and Child (MNR 253, on deposit at the Musée de Picardie in Amiens).

== See also ==
- List of claims for restitution for Nazi-looted art
- The Holocaust
- Aryanization
