= Paul Mankiewitz =

German banker and art collector

Paul Mankiewitz (born 7 November 1857 in Mühlhausen; died 22 June 1924 on his estate Selchow near Storkow) was a German bank manager and, from 1919 to 1923, chairman of Deutsche Bank.

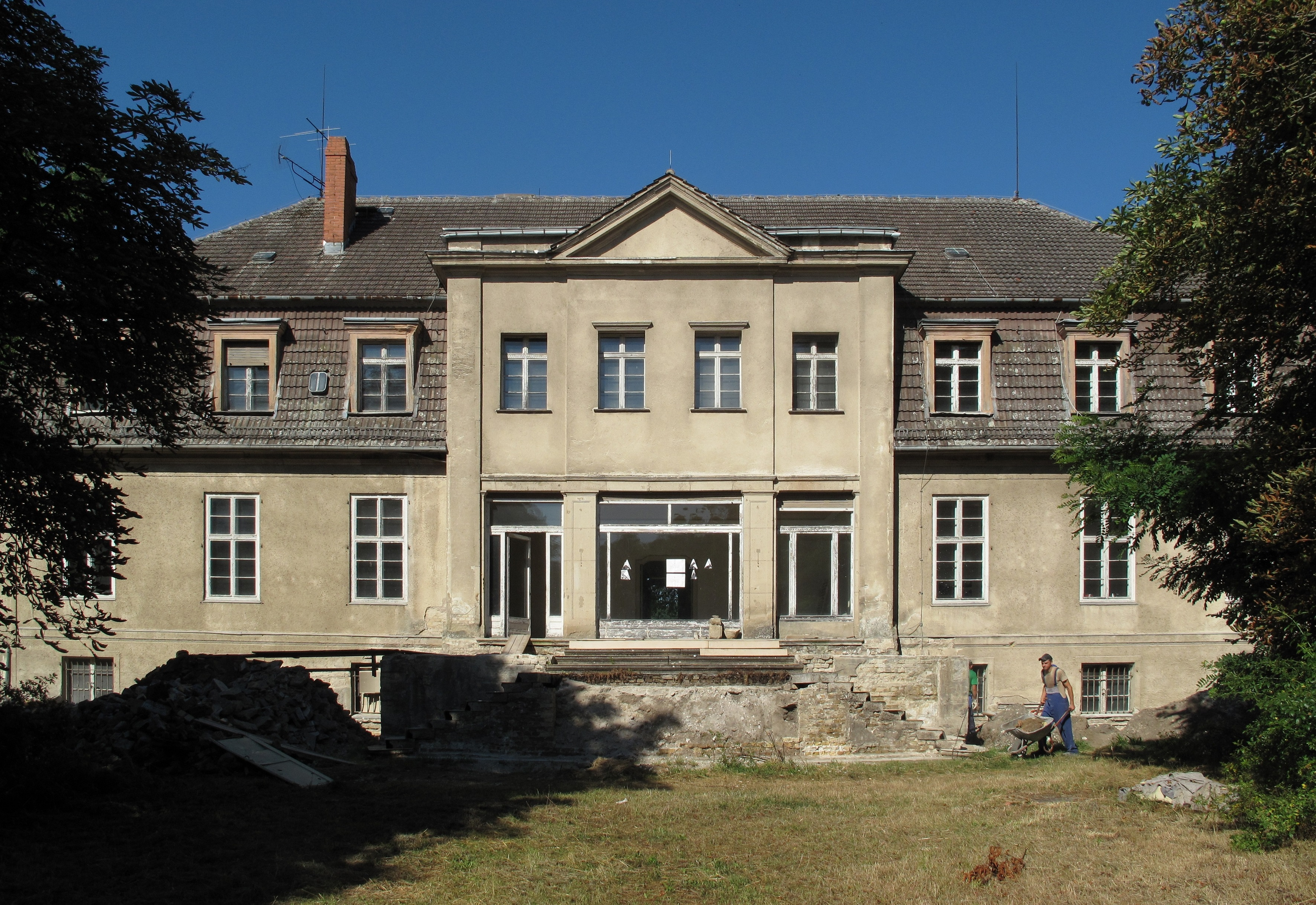
Today's listed country house Selchow, which Mankiewitz had built by Alfred Breslauer in 1913

== Life ==
After an apprenticeship at the Gustav Hanau banking house in Mülheim, Mankiewitz joined Deutsche Bank's head office in Berlin in 1879. In 1891, he became a deputy member of the board and joined the Society of Friends. In 1898, Mankiewitz moved up to the management board of Deutsche Bank and, together with Oscar Wassermann, headed its stock exchange business in 1912. From 1919 to 1923, he was chairman ('Sprecher') of the bank's board.

Mankiewitz was involved in the financing of Rhenish-Westphalian heavy industry. He was a member of the supervisory board of Phönix AG für Bergbau und Hüttenbetrieb. He also served on the advisory boards of several insurance companies. He was chairman of the board of "Kronos", Deutsche Lebensversicherungs-AG, Berlin, and deputy chairman of Accumulatorenfabrik AG, Berlin.

During World War I, he advised the Reichsbank on financing the war and, after the end of the war, on dealing with reparations claims. He set up financial aid that helped many students at German universities and technical institutes.

Mankiewitz was a member of Deutsche Bank's management board for almost forty-five years.

== Art ==
Mankiewitz's portrait was painted by Max Liebermann.

== Legacy ==
Paul Mankiewitz was married to Anna Mankiewitz (née Tarlau) and together they had three sons:

- Werner Mankiewitz (Berlin, 3 April 1893 – Buenos Aires, 11 November 1962), a banker and partner in the private bank J. Dreyfus & Co. When the Nazis came to power, Werner fled to Argentina.
- Hans Mankiewitz (born 14 November 1894), a merchant and director of the Deutsche Treuhandgesellschaft für Warenverkehr. Hans emigrated to Great Britain;
- Kurt Mankiewitz (born 24 May 1891; died 1974 in Los Angeles): an engineer who emigrated to the USA where he changed his name to Curt Emanuel Mankin.

Paul Mankiewitz was of the Jewish faith. His children fled Nazi Germany and survived, however, his wife's brother Richard was deported and killed in the Holocaust. The grave of the Mankiewitz family is located in the Jewish cemetery in Berlin-Weißensee.

== Literature ==
- Manfred Pohl (1990). "Mankiewitz, Paul". Neue Deutsche Biographie (in German). Vol. 16. Berlin: Duncker & Humblot. p. 37. (full text online).
