= Adolf Jandorf =

German entrepreneur

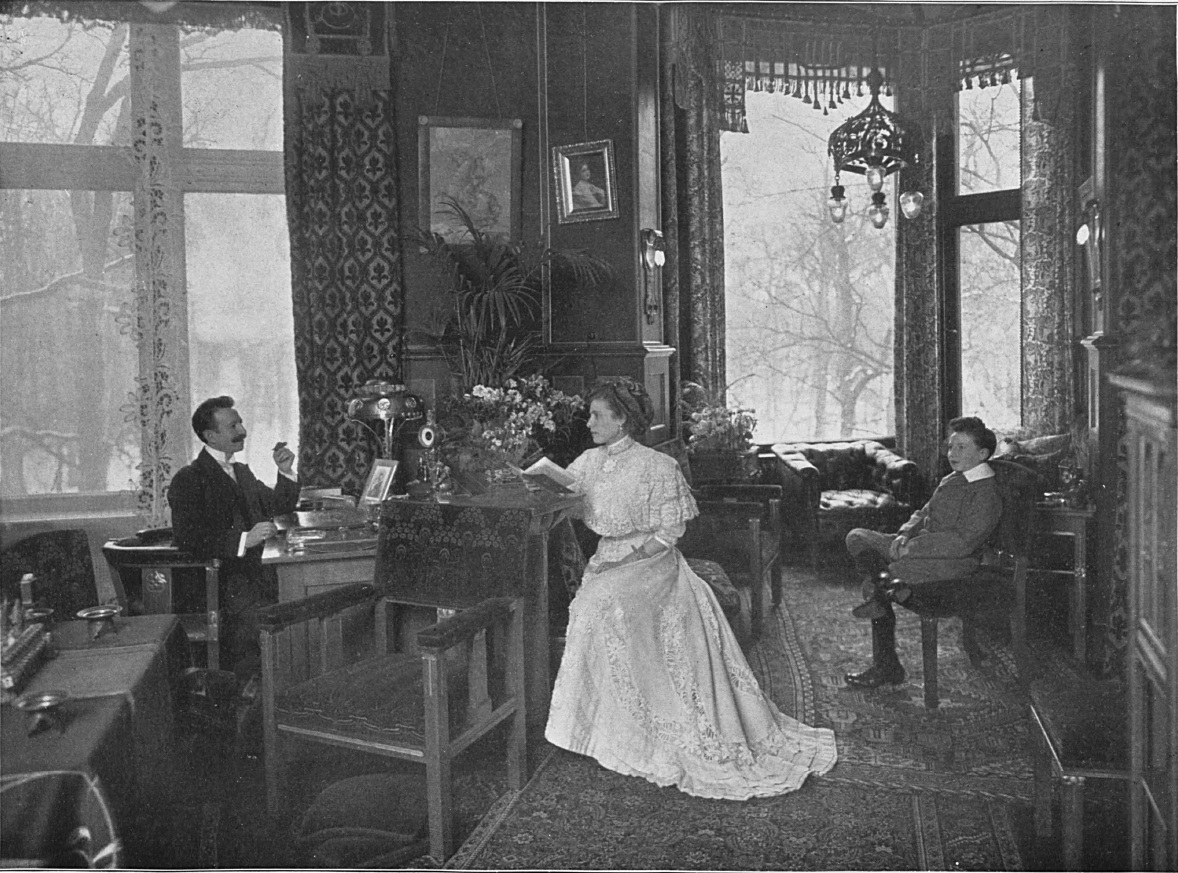
Adolf Jandorf with his family, 1908

Abraham Adolf Jandorf (7 February 1870 in Hengstfeld – 12 January 1932 in Berlin) was a Jewish German businessman, who owned and operated the department store chain A. Jandorf & Co. Through his use of the most modern sales techniques, he rose from humble beginnings to become one of Germany's major merchants. With the Kaufhaus des Westens (KaDeWe) in Berlin in 1907, he founded what is today Germany's best-known department store.

== Early life ==
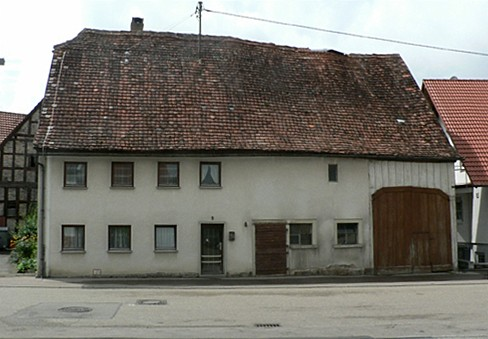
Birthplace of Jandorf in Hengstfeld, 2008

=== Apprenticeship and wandering years ===
Adolf Jandorf came from a poor Jewish family in a small village on the Hohenlohe plain. He was the second of seven children of the farmer, butcher and cattle dealer Josef Bernhard Jandorf (1840-1913) and his wife Rika, née Ansbacher (1843-1899). After an apprenticeship in a small manufacturing business in Bad Mergentheim from 1884 to 1887, in 1890, he went to the USA, to track down his eldest brother whom he found working as a streetcar conductor in New York City. During his self-financed stay, Adolf Jandorf got to know New York's department stores: Steward, Macy's and Bloomingdale's were the most modern department stores of their time.

=== Founding of the department store in Berlin ===
==== At the Spittelmarkt ====
At the beginning of the 1890s, Jandorf worked in Bremerhaven for the Hamburg textile trading company M. J. Emden Söhne, a trading group that undertook joint purchasing both on its own account and for numerous independent merchants. His "quick [...] perception and easy [...] adaptability in his business decisions" caught the attention of the management, so that in 1892 he was commissioned by the head of the company Jakob Emden to set up a small business in the capital Berlin with an advance of 500 marks. After six weeks, Jandorf had opened his first store at Spittelmarkt, on the corner of Leipziger Strasse, a store selling inexpensive trimmings, haberdashery and woolen goods. Contrary to the agreement, he identified the store on the company sign and stationery as his supposed property, namely as A. Jandorf & Co., Hamburger Engros Lager. Jandorf was able to turn the inevitable conflict with Jakob Emden in his favor with a threat of termination. However, since a cholera epidemic struck Hamburg in the same year, the addition of the name Hamburg had a devastating effect on sales. Faced with such start-up difficulties, Jandorf shortened the company name.

In 1894, he married Margarete Hirschfeld, and the birth of their only child Harry (1896-1981) followed shortly thereafter.

==== Kreuzberg (1897) ====
Rising demand soon made larger storage and sales premises necessary, so that Jandorf, against the reservations of Jakob Emden, had a second, larger department store built at the corner of Belle-Alliance-Strasse (today Blücherplatz 3) and Tempelhofer Ufer by architect Fritz Flatow from 1897 to 1898. It had two stories, a representative neo-baroque facade and initially had now 1,500 m^{2}; in 1899, an extension was built on the neighboring property. Jandorf was always to place his other department stores on a strategically well-located street corner. In 1922, he had a third floor added to the building; the five neo-baroque roof extensions and the roof balustrade fell victim to the conversion.

==== Friedrichshain and center ====
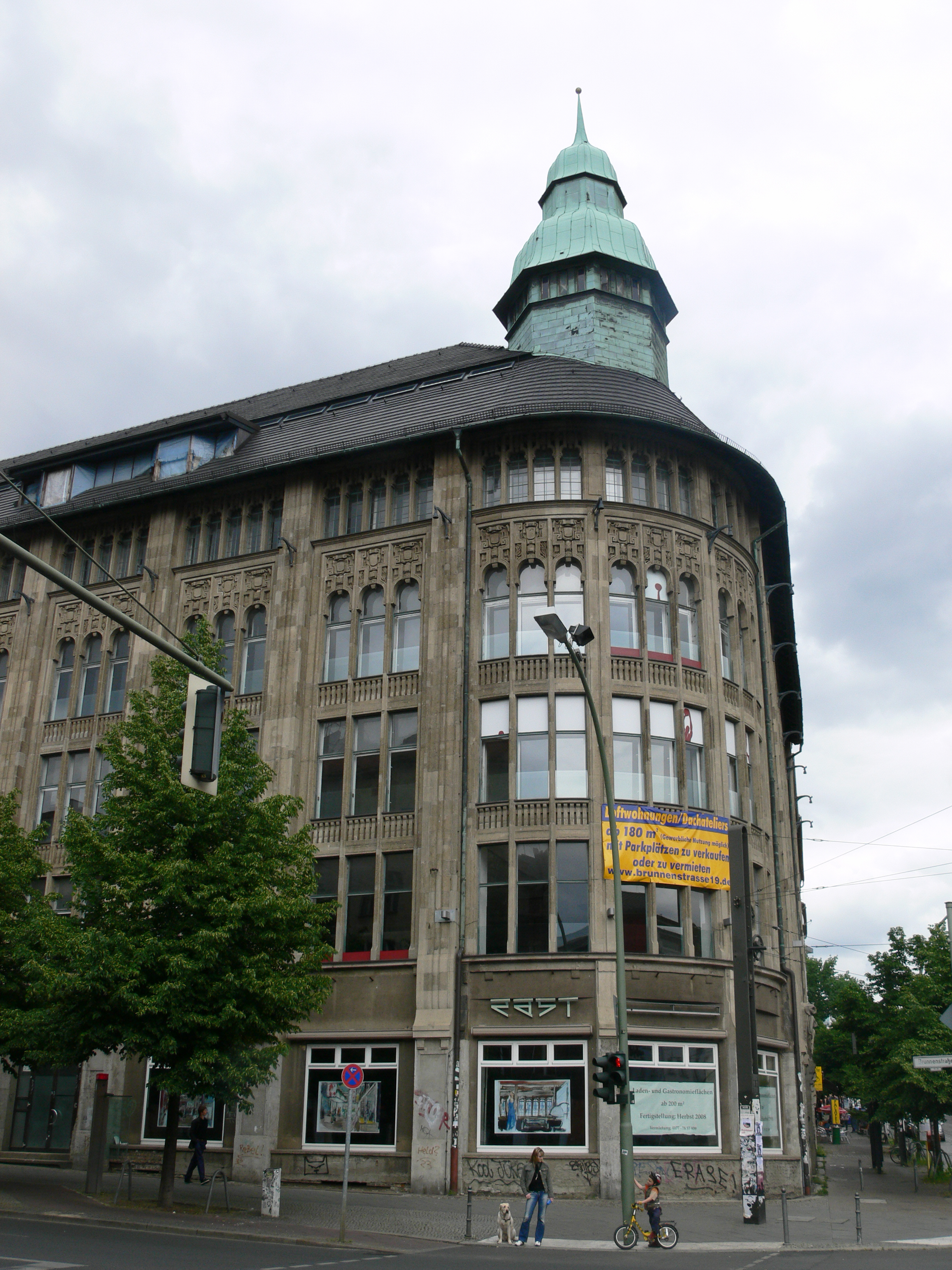
Jandorf department store, Berlin, corner of Brunnenstrasse and Veteranenstrasse, 2008

Further branches followed in 1901 at Große Frankfurter Strasse 113 (today Karl-Marx-Allee 68), at the corner of Andreasstraße, and in 1904 at the corner of Brunnenstrasse and Veteranenstrasse. The building in Karl-Marx-Allee was destroyed during the Second World War, and its remains disappeared with the redevelopment of Stalinallee.

The department store on the Weinberg was a five-story steel skeleton building, faced with a clearly structured natural stone facade, and could be flexibly designed inside. The facade is decorated, among other things, with bees as symbols of diligence and with tracery in the Art Nouveau style. The house survived the Second World War undamaged and served in the GDR from 1953 as the Institute for Fashion Design, later House of Fashion.

==== Charlottenburg ====
Jandorf had his sixth house built from 1905 to 1906 in Charlottenburg at Wilmersdorfer Strasse 115, on the corner of Pestalozzistrasse, by the architect Alfred Lesser. At the end of the Second World War it was partially destroyed, Georg Karg of the department store chain Hertie had the department store rebuilt from 1951 to 1955. Further conversions and extensions followed, and today it is home to a Karstadt store.

==== Kreuzberg (1906) ====
In 1906, he purchased a completed building at Kottbusser Damm 1 in the working-class district of Kreuzberg for 3.35 million marks, which was designed by Franz Ahrens and is also considered the first private reinforced concrete building in Berlin. This made him one of the ten largest department store entrepreneurs in Germany.

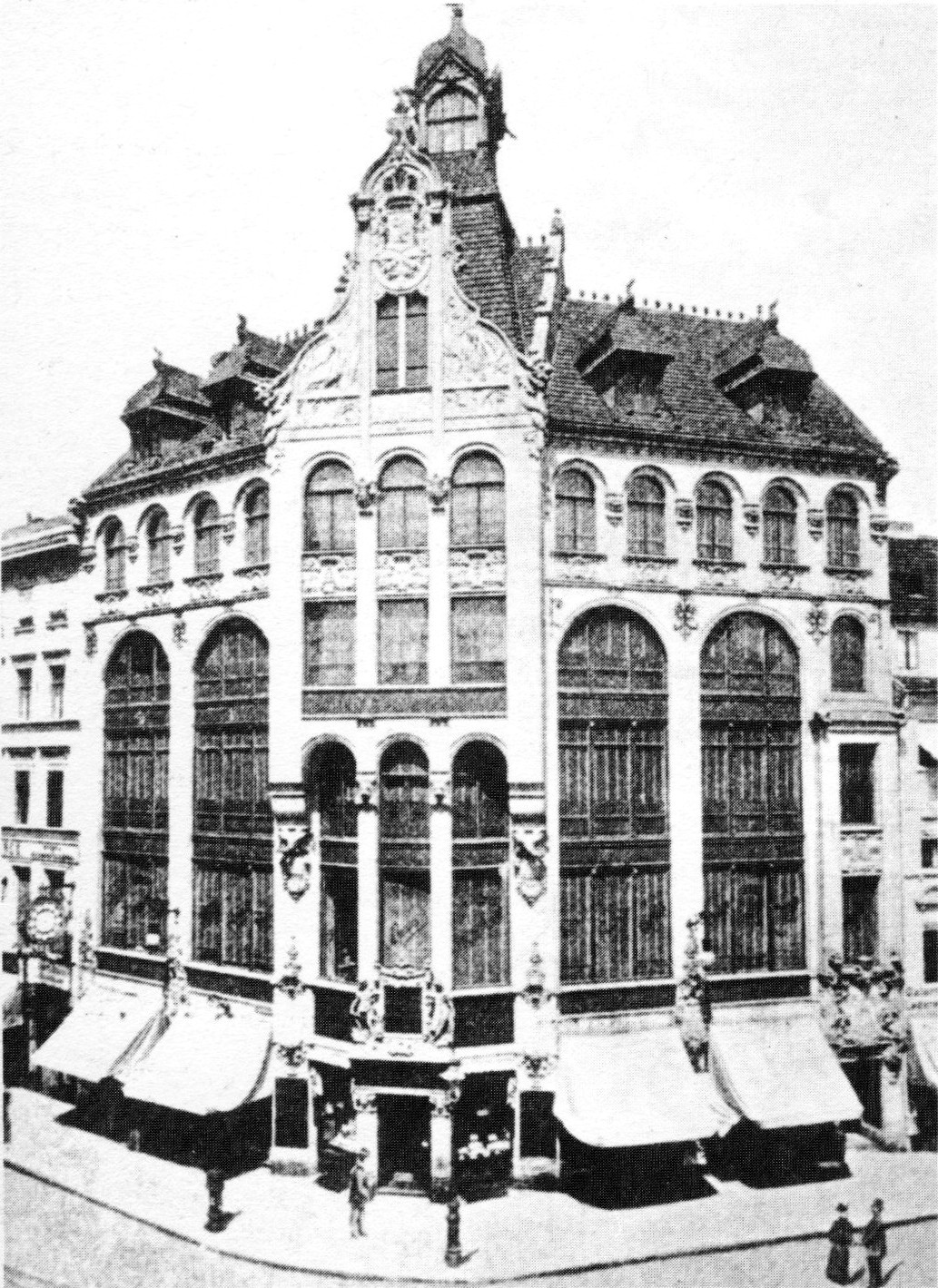
Warenhaus Jandorf am Spittelmarkt, Ecke Leipziger Straße, 1892

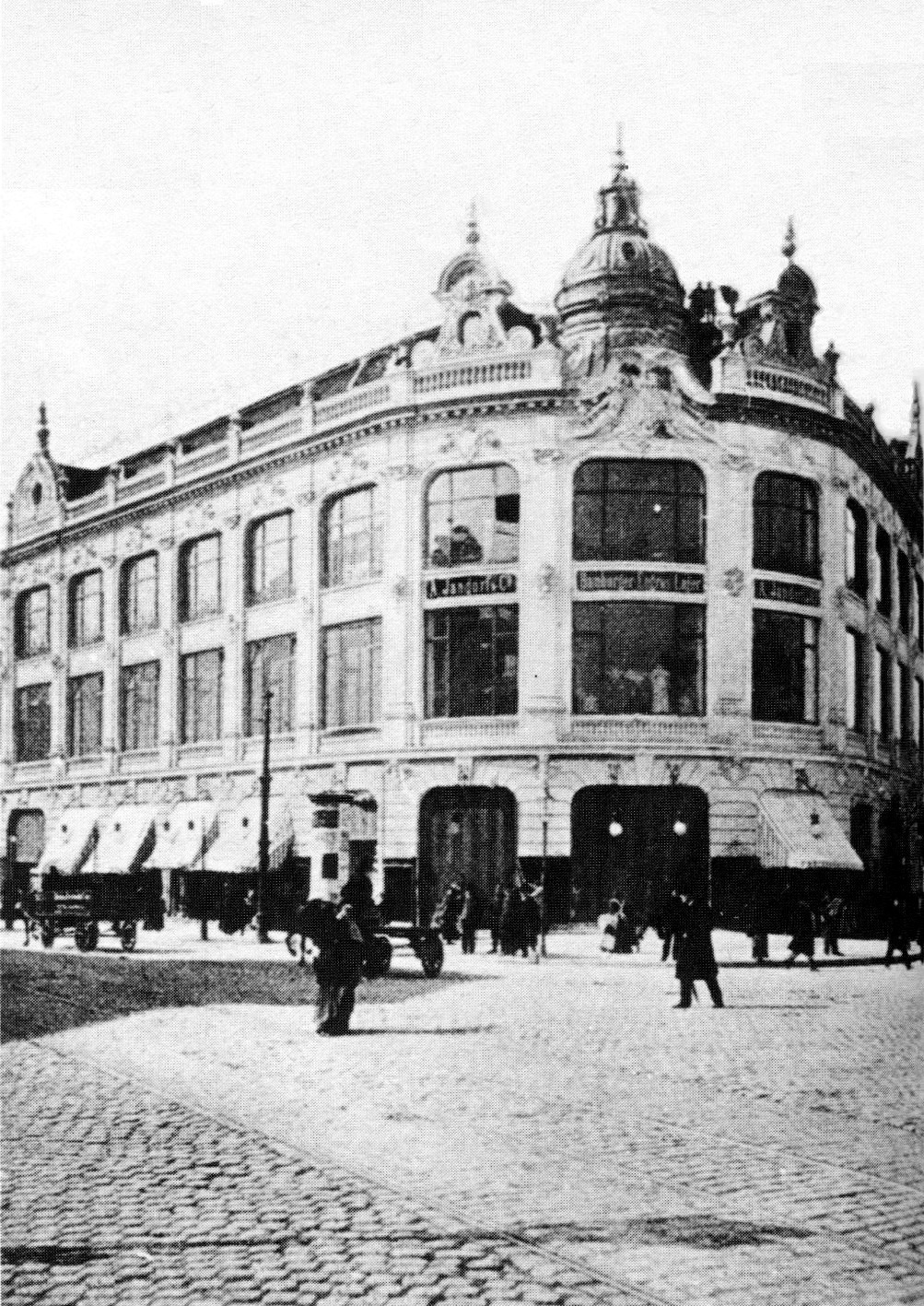
Warenhaus Jandorf an der Belle-Alliance-Straße, Ecke Tempelhofer Ufer, 1898

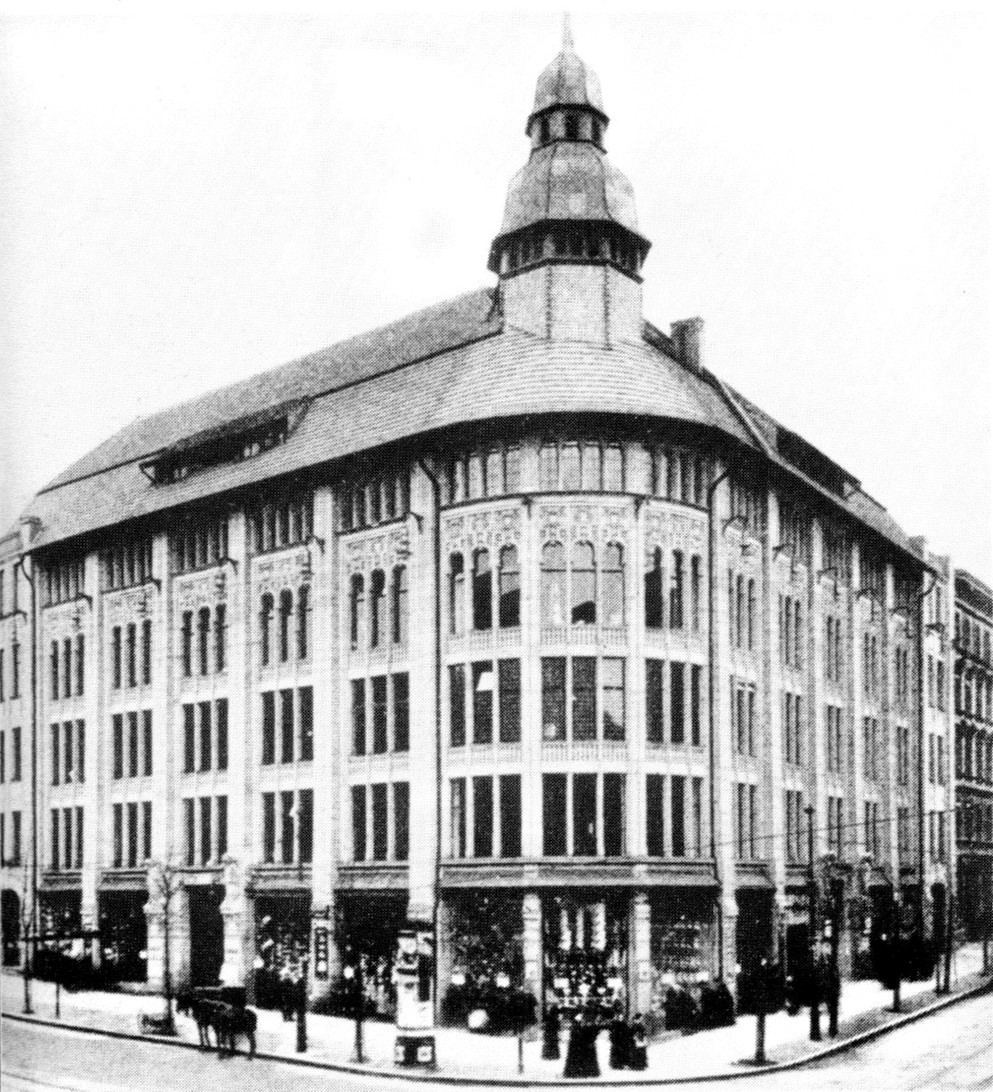
Warenhaus Jandorf, Brunnenstrasse, 1904
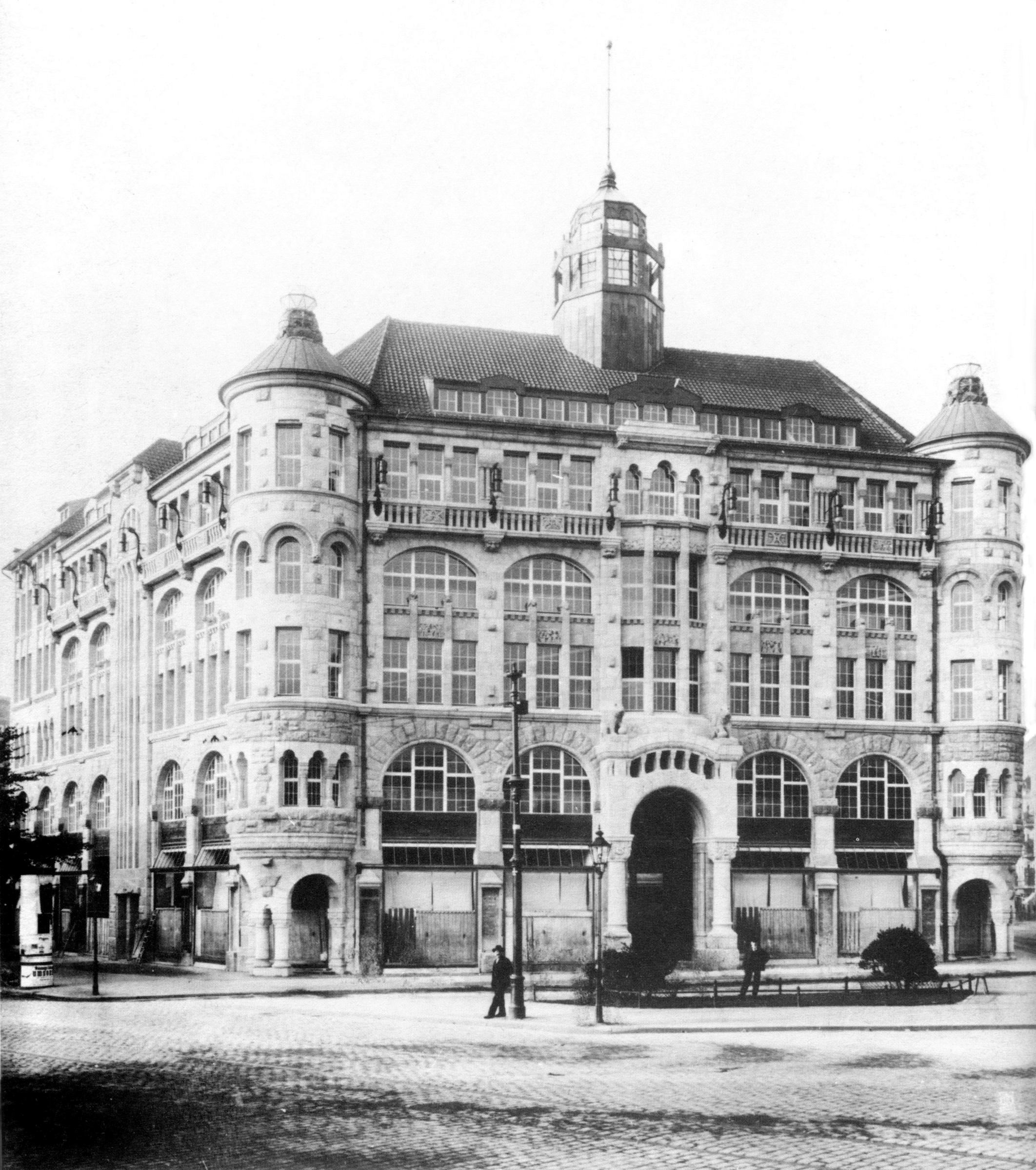
Warenhaus Jandorf, Kottbusser Damm, 1906, Architekt: Franz Ahrens

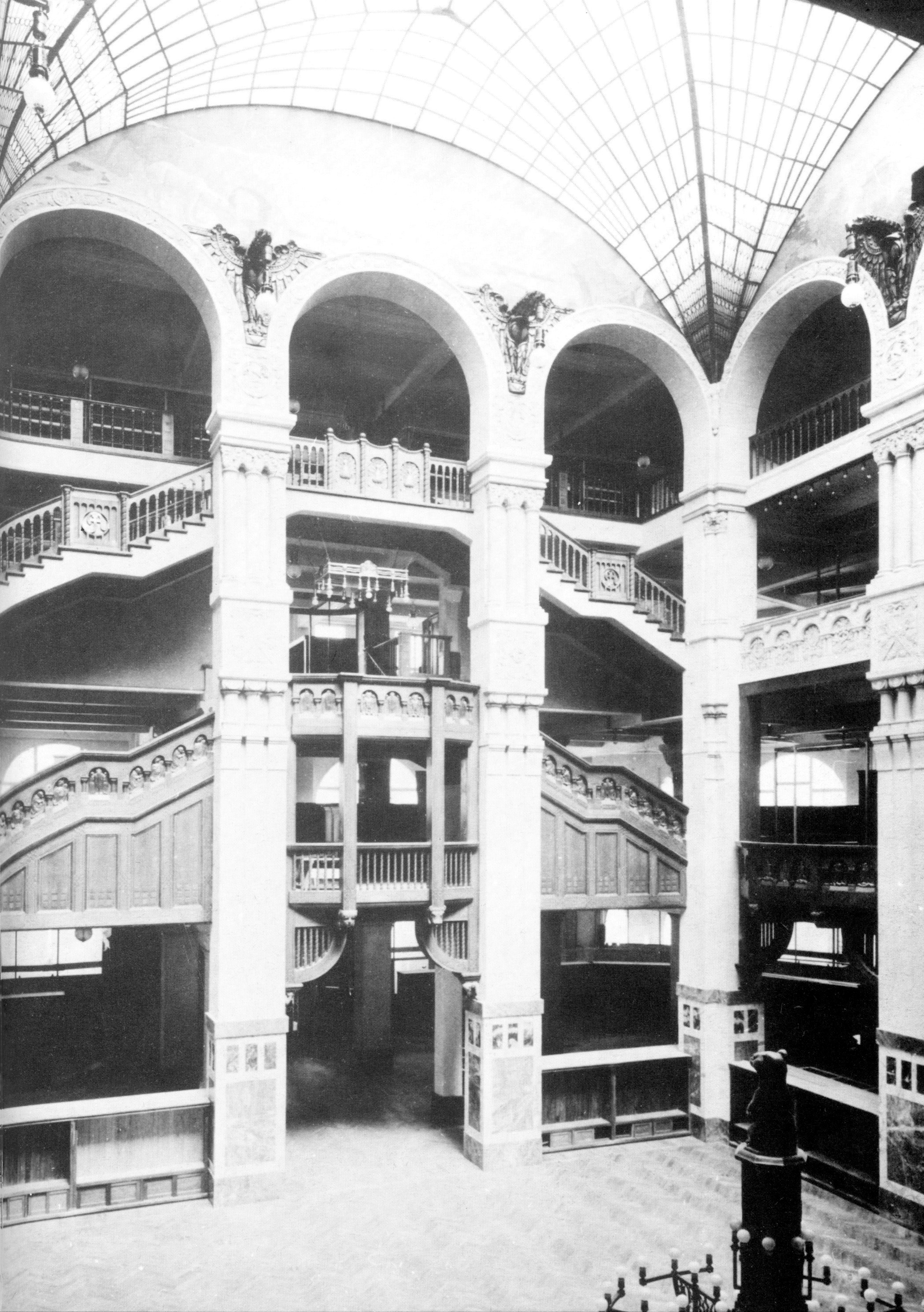
Warenhaus Jandorf, Kottbusser Damm, Lichthof, 1906

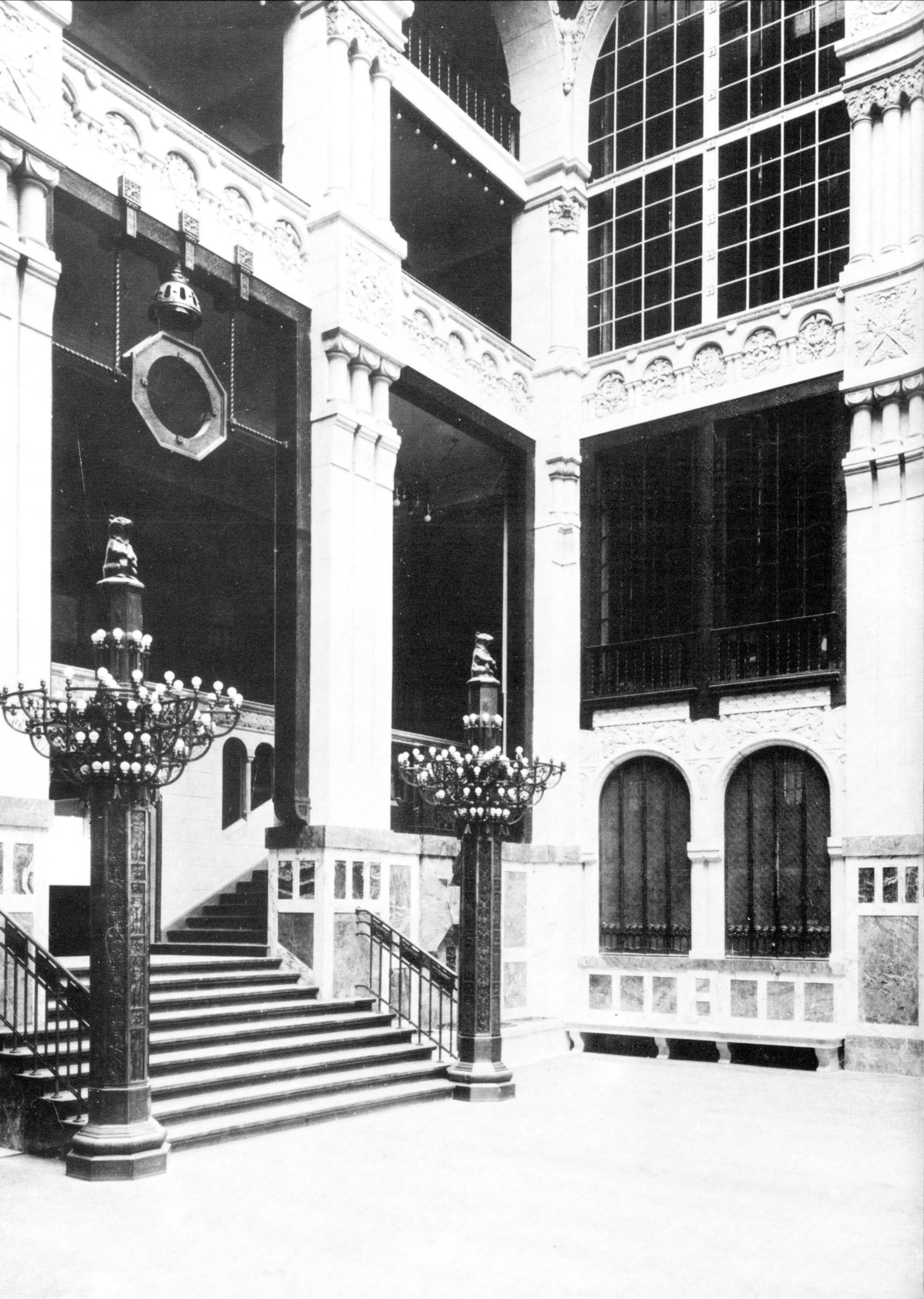
Warenhaus Jandorf, Kottbusser Damm, Lichthof, 1906

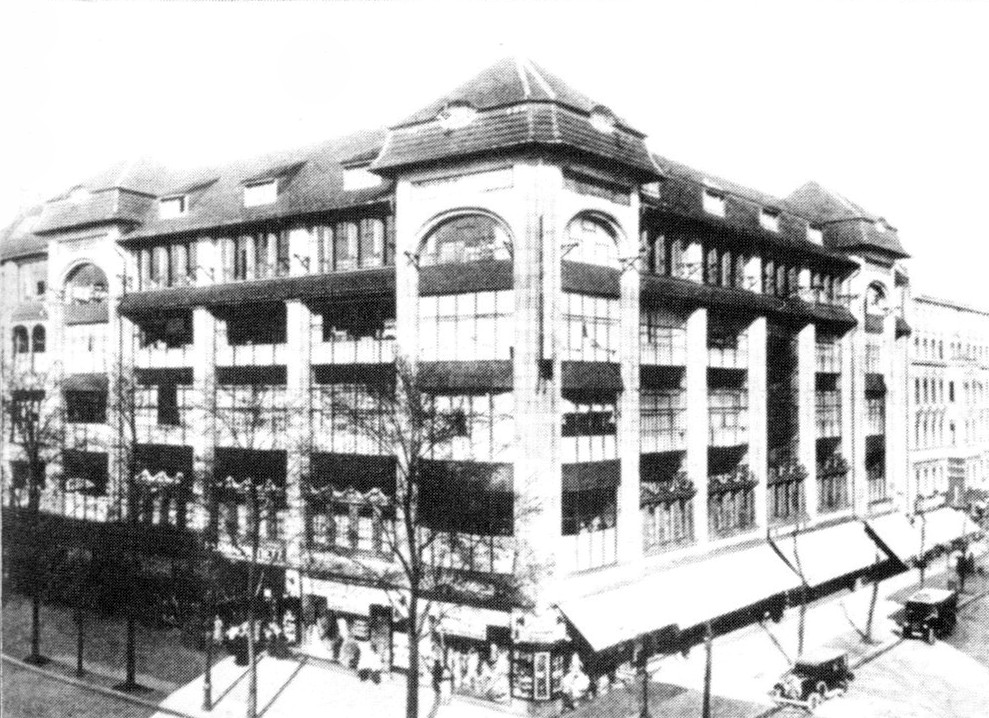
Warenhaus Jandorf, Wilmersdorfer Str., Ecke Pestalozzistraße, um 1920

==== Department Store of the West ====
His seventh and last department store made history: Until then, Jandorf had served the tangible needs of the ordinary people of Berlin, now it was to be upscale. For the Kaufhaus des Westens (KaDeWe), a separate limited liability company was founded in 1905 by M. J. Emden Söhne with 79,000 marks and merchant Hermann Knauer with 1,000 marks. Jandorf initially remained in the background, and it was not until September 1906 that he contributed the main share with 1,921,000 marks, with Deutsche Bank providing the loan financing. He dropped his name from the title of the department store.

Jandorf chose the border between the then still independent cities of Charlottenburg and Schöneberg at the end of Tauentzienstrasse as the location. The architect Johann Emil Schaudt planned the design with five stories and a matter-of-fact, sober facade made of Franconian shell limestone. Merchant Hermann Knauer constructed the building with his company Boswau & Knauer. Interior designer Franz Habich, who had previously furnished Munich's Oberpollinger department store, took over the interior design, which was unanimously described as "noble," "modern" and "dignified," with wood paneling and natural stone.

Capable managers were hired from other Berlin department stores, so that the A. Wertheim company was litigated in some cases before the merchants' court. For the technical infrastructure, his brother Moritz Jandorf traveled to London to study the pneumatic tube system and new sales techniques. KaDeWe offered in addition to the sale of goods in 120 departments: "hairdressing salons for ladies and gentlemen, the travel agency, the exchange office, refreshment and tea rooms, as well as photographic studio and lending library".

On 27 March 1907, after an advertising campaign in the daily newspapers with, for the first time, large-format graphics in Art Nouveau style by August Hajduk, the opening took place. In August 1907, King Chulalongkorn, Rama V of Siam, and his entourage spent two days shopping in the Kaufhaus des Westens, dining lavishly in the Fürstenzimmer and spending a total of 250,000 marks. This was the tacitly hoped-for upgrade of KaDeWe by the high nobility, which made an impression on the court, the bourgeoisie and the civil service. In gratitude, Rama V awarded Jandorf the White Order of the Elephant and appointed him Honorary Consul of Siam in 1912.

=== Attacks by retailers and anti-Semites ===
The success of the Jandorf department store group, the Wertheim Department Stores Group, the Hermann Tietz Group and Rudolph Karstadt's department stores attracted "Envy, resentment and increasingly open, organized attacks." Merchants with small retail stores formed lobbies such as the Zentral-Vorstand Kaufmännischer Verbände und Vereine Deutschlands to try to slow the growth of department stores. The Prussian Department Store Act of 18 June 1900 imposed additional taxes on all commercial enterprises that offered more than two of four arbitrarily determined groups of goods and had a turnover of more than 400,000 marks. Construction of further department stores was limited with building regulations. In 1906, for example, a bill was presented in the Prussian Parliament stating that, due to the risk of fire, no more sales could take place above the second floor.

The press attacked the department stores for their Jewish owners and managers. In 1932, a year before the Nazi dictatorship, 25% of German merchants in the retail trade were of Jewish origin, while the proportion of department store owners was 79%. In response, Oscar Tietz founded the Association of German Department Stores in February 1903, and Jandorf took a seat on the executive committee.

The Berlin police opened a file on Jandorf, collecting negative rumors and devaluing gifts and donations to social institutions such as the German Association for Children's Asylums or the court theaters in Gotha and Detmold. In April 1916, during the First World War, police chief Traugott von Jagow demanded in a memo that Jandorf be called up for military service in order to "wash away with his blood at least a small part of the heavy guilt which he has incurred, if not legally, then at least morally." The request had been preceded by the sale of inferior military boots to the Austrian army, which had been committed without Jandorf's knowledge by two merchants from a consortium of suppliers who were not members of the company. After Jagow left for Breslau in 1916, he was not called up again.

Throughout his life, Jandorf received no official recognition of his services from the Prussian state; a Cross of Merit for War Aid was revoked at Jagow's instigation. The title of Kommerzienrat had been conferred on Jandorf by the Bavarian king in 1910, not by the Prussian one. Numerous honors from the German states and abroad, such as the Japanese Order of the Sacred Treasure, attested to Jandorf's good reputation.

=== Sale of the department stores ===
Jandorf's business partners M. J. Emden Söhne sold their 19 department stores to Rudolph Karstadt AG in 1926. At that time, the Jandorf Group employed over 3,000 people and was worth a high double-digit million figure. On 2 December 1926 the companies A. Jandorf & Co. and Hermann Tietz oHG announced in a joint communiqué that at the turn of the year 1927, all Jandorf department stores and land would become the property of Tietz. The Hermann Tietz OHG group of companies thus became the largest department store group in Europe in 1928, with annual sales of 300 million Reichsmarks.

=== Family ===
Jandorf brought together Karl (1872-1930), Robert (1875-1958), who actually wanted to become a rabbi, Moritz (* 1879) and, als Group's legal advisor, Julius Jandorf (1883-1962), a lawyer with a doctorate, four of his brothers to manage his branches in Berlin. Their father had sold his house and farm after the death of his wife Rika in October 1899 and moved into his son Adolf's house at Augsburger Strasse 23 in the Bavarian Quarter. His sons Robert, Moritz and Julius also lived there.

Jandorf's wife Margarete died in 1920. In autumn 1928 he married Helene Lehmann (1902-1965), who had been baptized a Protestant and converted to Judaism before the wedding. Jandorf died in 1932 as a result of appendicitis. He was buried in the Jewish Cemetery in Berlin-Weißensee (section T 2).

Jandorf's son Harry fled the Nazi regime in 1932, first to Amsterdam and later to the USA, Los Angeles. Adolf Jandorf's siblings also emigrated to the USA.

=== Nazi era and legacy ===
When the Nazis came to power, the Jandorf family was persecuted because of their Jewish heritage.

On 4 and 5 March 1936, the furniture, paintings and library of their residence on Lützowplatz were auctioned off by Rudolph Lepke's Kunst-Auctions-Haus. In 1937, his wife Helene emigrated to the neighboring Netherlands, The Hague, Hotel Wittebrug. In 1938, the actor Heinz Rühmann purchased Jandorf's summer house at Kleine Wannsee through an intermediary for 40% of the regular value. Harry Jandorf had designed a wooden house in Scandinavian country house style for his father, which was built by the timber construction company Christoph & Unmack. The house burned down during World War II. A claim by Helene Jandorf for a refund of the full market value was dismissed by the Berlin Regional Court in 1952.

=== Commemoration ===
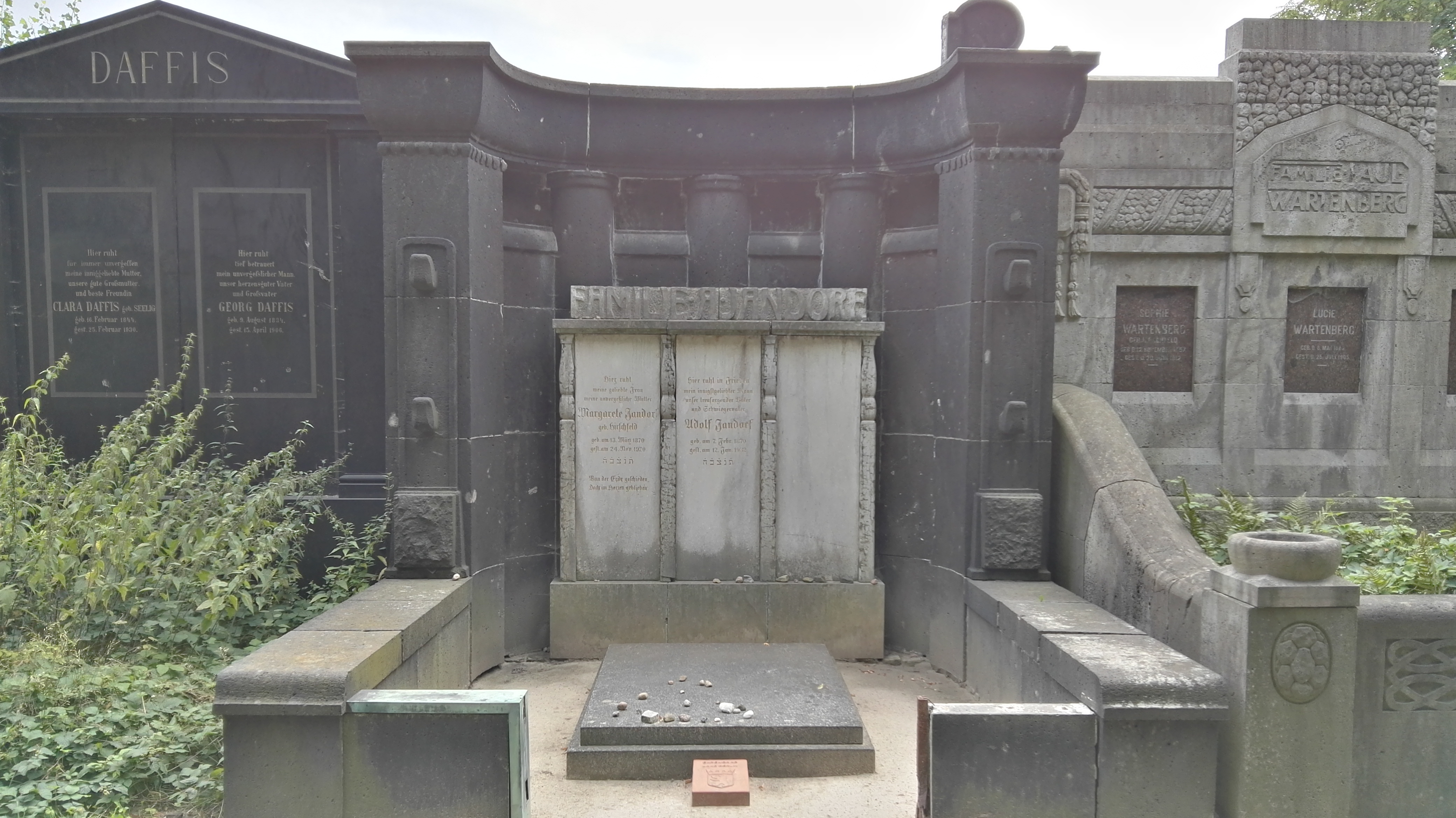
Familiengrab Jandorf im Jüdischen Friedhof Berlin-Weißensee mit Ehrentafel, 2016

Because of the many donations Jandorf had made to his hometown, he was made an honorary citizen in 1908. The honorary citizenship continued during the Nazi dictatorship, which had been concealed from the Nazi bureaucracy. To commemorate 100 years of honorary citizenship, a memorial plaque was donated in his birthplace of Hengstfeld on 14 September 2008. It is located at the former town hall near the church. Furthermore, a street in Hengstfeld was named after Adolf Jandorf. After the Second World War, Berlin designated his grave as an honorary grave.

== TV series ==
KaDeWe: Our Time Is Now (ARD)

== Citations ==
Adolf Jandorf ist ‚der Typ des modernen, sehnigen, widerstandskräftigen Selfmademan von einer kolossalen Energie, verbunden mit schneller Auffassungsgabe und leichter Anpassungsfähigkeit in seinen geschäftlichen Entschlüssen. (Adolf Jandorf is the type of modern, sinewy, resilient self-made man with colossal energy, combined with a quick grasp and easy adaptability in his business decisions.

— Leo Colze, 1908.

Bienenfleiß und Emsigkeit, Selbstdisziplin und Ehrgeiz, das waren auch die zutreffenden Attribute für den erfolgreichen Kaufmann Adolf Jandorf.(Diligence and industriousness, self-discipline and ambition were also the appropriate attributes for the successful businessman Adolf Jandorf)

— Nils Busch-Petersen, 2008.

== Literature ==
- Leo Colze (= Leo Cohn): Wie die Warenhäuser groß wurden. In: ders., Berliner Warenhäuser. (= Großstadt-Dokumente, Band 47.) Hermann Seemann Nachfolger, Berlin 1908, S. 56–60, Digitalisat der Zentral- und Landesbibliothek Berlin (ZLB).
- Harry Jandorf: Erinnerungen an meinen Vater Adolf Jandorf. In: Leo Baeck Institute, Center for Jewish History, New York City 1967, Typoskript (PDF; 7 S., 4,7 MB), Datensatz.
- Wolfgang Wölk (1974). "Jandorf, Adolf". Neue Deutsche Biographie (in German). Vol. 10. Berlin: Duncker & Humblot. pp. 332–333. (full text online).
- Roland Jakel: Adolf Jandorf, Kommerzienrat: Ehrenbürger der ehemaligen Gemeinde Hengstfeld; Gründer des KaDeWe in Berlin. Hengstfeld 2007, Gedenkschrift.
- Nils Busch-Petersen: Adolf Jandorf. Vom Volkswarenhaus zum KaDeWe. (= Jüdische Miniaturen, Band 32.) Hentrich & Hentrich, Berlin 2007, ISBN 978-3-938485-10-1, Inhaltsangabe.
- Antonia Meiners: 100 Jahre KaDeWe. Nicolai-Verlag, Berlin 2007, ISBN 3-89479-386-4,.
- W. Michael Blumenthal: Mehr als ein Gourmet-Tempel. In: WamS, 14. Oktober 2007.
- Martin Otto: Jandorf, Adolf. In: Maria Magdalena Rückert (Hrsg.): Württembergische Biographien unter Einbeziehung hohenzollerischer Persönlichkeiten. Band II. Im Auftrag der Kommission für geschichtliche Landeskunde in Baden-Württemberg. Kohlhammer, Stuttgart 2011, ISBN 978-3-17-021530-6, S. 147–149.

== Links ==
- Großes Portrait- (um 1930) in kultur-online.net und kleines Portraitbild von Jandorf (1925)
- Jandorf, Adolf. In: LEO-BW
- Literature by and about Adolf Jandorf in the German National Library catalogue
