= Galeria (department store) =

German department store chain

GALERIA S.à r.l. & Co. KG

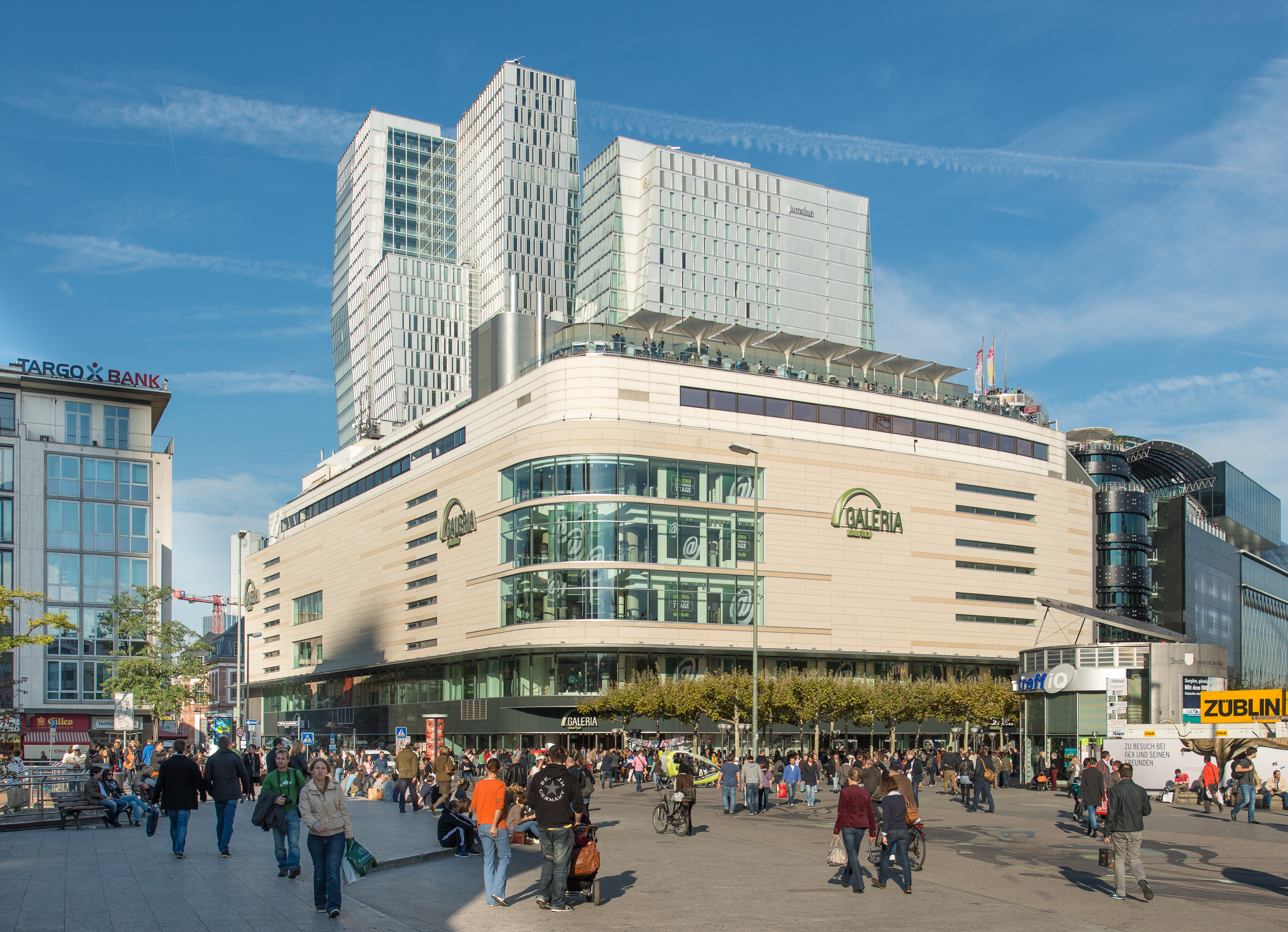
- Galeria in Frankfurt am Main
- Trade name: Galeria
- Type: GmbH
- Industry: Retail
- Genre: Department store
- Predecessor: Galeria Kaufhof; Karstadt
- Founded: 2018; 8 years ago
- Headquarters: Germany
- Number of locations: 83 (2025)
- Area served: Germany
- Subsidiaries: Inno
- Website: galeria.de

Galeria (formerly Galeria Karstadt Kaufhof GmbH, German pronunciation: [ɡaleˈʁiːa ˈkaːɐ̯ʃtat ˈkaʊfhoːf]) is Germany's last remaining department store company and is described as one of "Europe's oldest and largest". The company operates under the legal name GALERIA S.à r.l. & Co. KG.

The company employs approximately 12,000 employees at 83 stores across Germany.

== History ==
Former logo, used 2019-2021

The modern Galeria department store group was formed through the consolidation of Germany's two major chains, Galeria Kaufhof and Karstadt.

In June 2015, Galeria Kaufhof was acquired by the North American retailer Hudson's Bay Company (HBC) from Metro AG for 2.82 billion euros, including liabilities.

In September 2018, HBC and Austria's Signa Holding agreed to merge their two German chains, combining HBC's Galeria Kaufhof stores with Signa's Karstadt stores. The resulting entity, officially launched in 2019 as Galeria Karstadt Kaufhof, was initially projected to form Europe's third-biggest department store group.

Signa, controlled by Austrian investor René Benko, gained sole control of the Galeria Karstadt Kaufhof group in June 2019, which it maintained until it filed for insolvency in November 2023.

Galeria filed for insolvency for the third time in January 2024, following the collapse of its parent, Signa.

In April 2024, Galeria was sold to a consortium of U.S. investor Richard Baker (CEO of HBC) and German businessman Bernd Beetz. The takeover was intended to stabilize Germany's department store group.

The new owners moved the firm's headquarters from Essen to Düsseldorf in 2025, ending Galeria's presence in Essen after more than 120 years.

Galeria initiated partnerships to introduce new tenants and uses to its stores. For example, the chain partnered with discounter Lidl in Berlin to open markets within two remaining Galeria locations in Charlottenburg and Kreuzberg. Sporting goods retailer Decathlon also planned to move into some Galeria stores.

Many former Karstadt and Galeria Kaufhof buildings were converted to other uses across Germany. A former Karstadt Sports location in Hamburg found a new tenant in SportScheck. In Harburg, the former Karstadt building was converted into a museum ("Planet Harburg") and a cinema. In Dresden, the Citizens' Office moved into the fifth floor of the Galeria (formerly Galeria Karstadt) building. The former Galeria Kaufhof in Trier reopened as an outlet store.

Despite these changes, and a 160 million euro bailout from Gordon Brothers in June 2026, the company filed for its fourth bankruptcy in six years on October 5, 2026.
