= Karstadt (Bremen) =

Department store in Bremen, Germany

Coordinates: 53°4′37.4″N 8°48′23″E

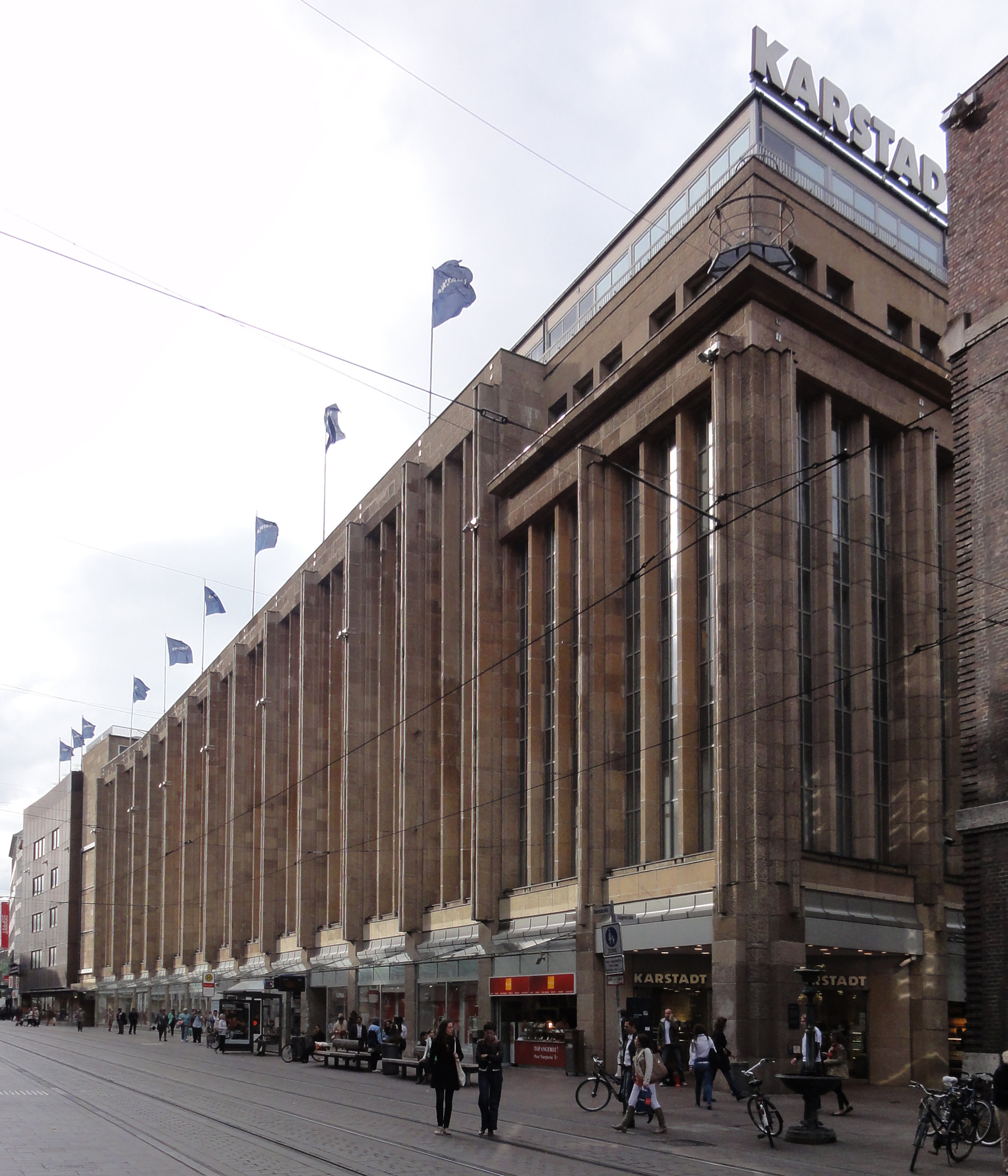
Karstadt in Obernstrasse

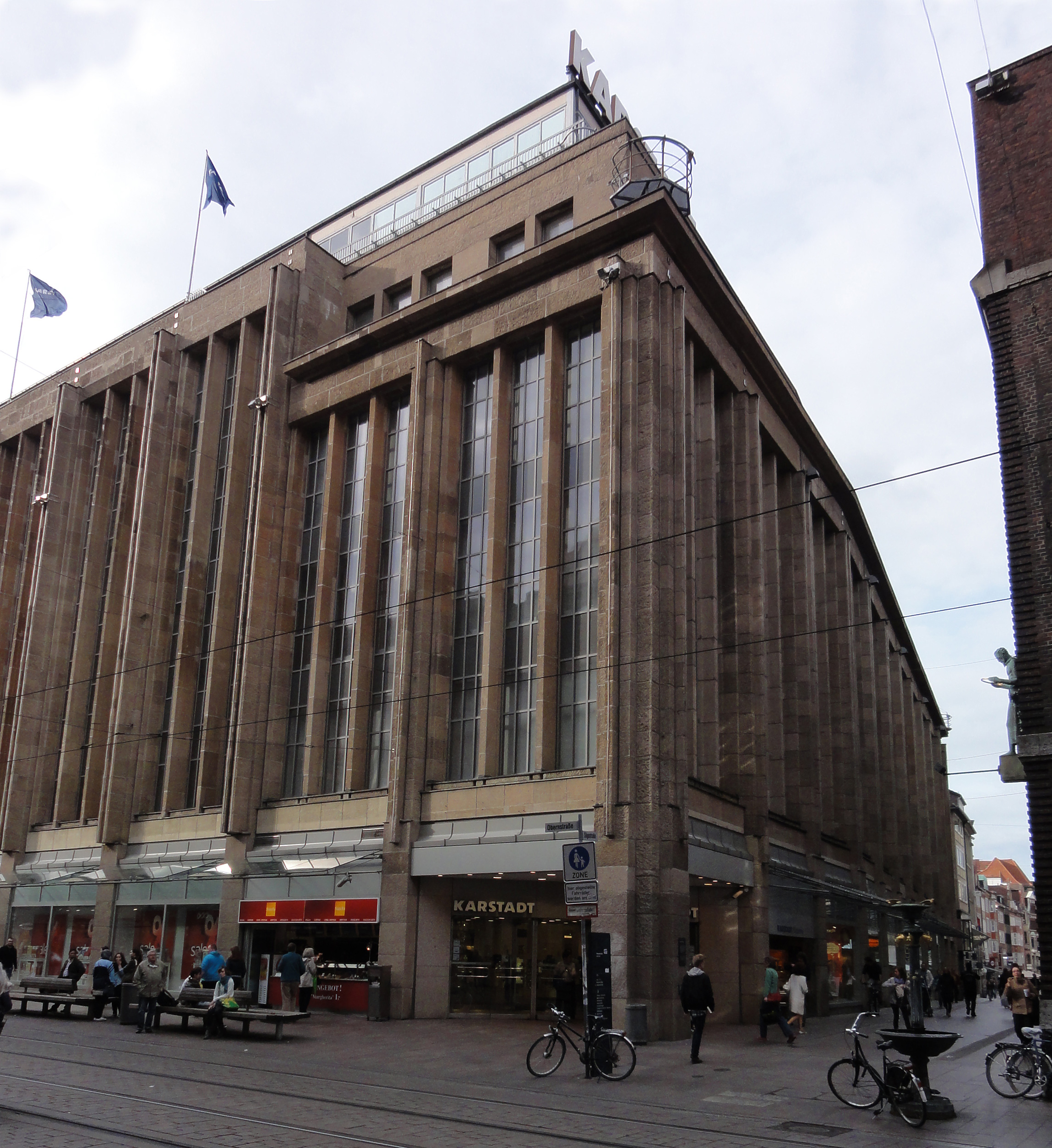
Karstadt at the corner of Obernstrasse and Sögestrasse

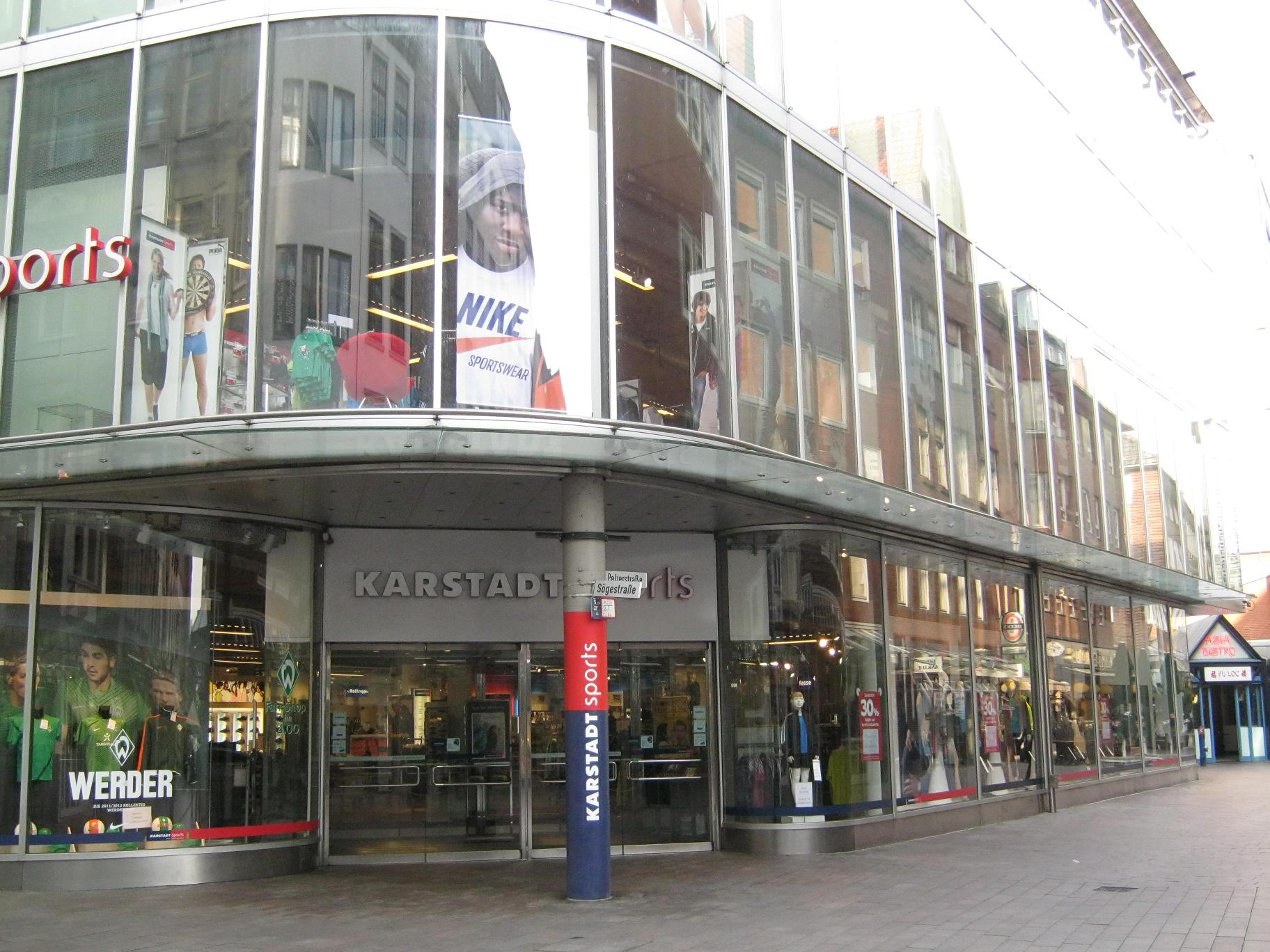
Karstadt Sports in Sögestrasse

Karstadt in Bremen is the largest department store in Bremen. It is located on Obernstrasse and Sögestrasse, in the old town in the city centre. Completed in 1932, the building was listed in 2010 as a notable example of department store architecture in the interwar period.

== History ==
The first building was built on the corner of Sögestrasse and Pelzerstrasse by Rudolph Karstadt AG., established in 1881 by Rudolph Karstadt. The first branch in Bremen had opened in the year of 1902.

Between 1930 and 1932, a new building was built on the corner of Obernstrasse and Sögestrasse. There were two architects: the Bremen office of Heinrich Wilhelm Behrens (1873-1956) and Friedrich Neumark. The building was designed in accordance with the approach of the Karstadt construction office under the leadership of Philipp Schaefer. In 2010, the building was listed for heritage protection under the Monuments Act.

The Landesamt für Denkmalpflege Bremen (LfD), the Department for Preservation and Protection of Historical Buildings, describes it as a five-storey building with a concrete frame, faced with a coarsely embossed surface of Ettringen tuff. Its architecture is considered representative of the department store style of the second and third decades of the 20th century. Together with the Nordwolle building (“Haus des Reichs”) and the concert hall "Die Glocke", it a prime example of architectural development in the city of Bremen between the two wars, notable above all for its particularly modern look. Philipp Schaefer had developed an architectural language which was not only consistent but also convincing in a formal sense.

The old building in Sögestrasse was subsequently used for low-priced commodities under the name of "EPA-Warenhaus" and later "Kepa-Kaufhaus". During the Second World War, it was completely destroyed. When the department store "Kepa-Kaufhaus" closed, its post-war building was demolished. In 1995, "Karstadt-Sports", a department store for sports goods was built, designed by Ingenhoven & Ingenhoven from Neuss.

When the department store Horten came to Bremen, Karstadt had the opportunity to buy the building housing the DeFaKa-department store in Obernstrasse. The façade of that building had a brown metallic covering. In 1965, it underwent major refurbishment with the closure of the atrium and the installation of four escalators.

== Business development ==
Karstadt was involved when the "Grosse Hundestrasse" was converted into the "Lloyd-Passage" pedestrian zone. After its expansion, Karstadt became the largest department store in Northern Germany. In terms of variety of goods, it was Germany's fourth largest. In its building on Obernstrasse, there are seven floors covering 30,000 m^{2} (320,000 sq ft) of sales area. In the basement, there is a sizeable foodstuffs area. Up to 1,000 employees are employed in the Karstadt branch.
