= Frank Philipp Albert =

German realtor

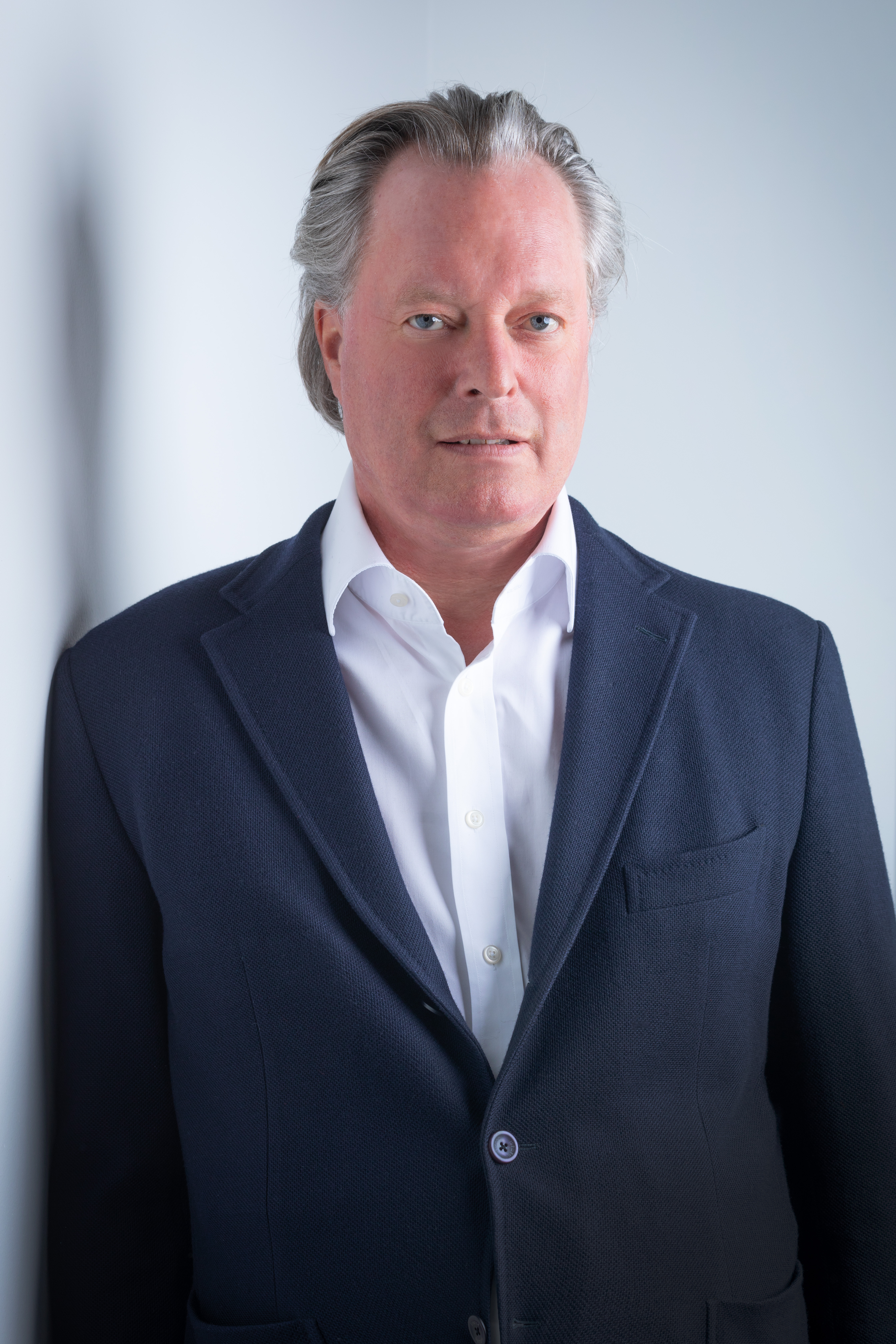
Frank Philipp Albert

Frank Philipp Albert (born 29 December 1966 in Schwerte, Germany) is a real-estate entrepreneur, founder and director of Supernova-Group, specialising in the development and management of retail parks and shopping centers in numerous Central European countries.

== Early life and education ==
Frank Philipp Albert grew up in Menden, Sauerland in Germany and moved to Graz, Austria after finishing high school. He studied economics at the University of Graz, graduating in 1994 with a doctorate on the subject of industrial economic analysis of the Styrian wine industry.

== Career ==
Albert gained his first professional experience in his parents' firm, a production company in the lighting industry. In 1994, he founded his own company, known today as Supernova-Group, of which he has been chief executive ever since.

Supernova-Group focuses on the development and management of retail properties in Central and Eastern Europe. The company's portfolio includes over 100 projects, such as shopping centers, retail parks and specialized retail space in Austria, Slovenia, Croatia, Slovakia, Romania and Italy and elsewhere. The company generates annual rental income of approximately 180 million euros.

In 2015, Supernova acquired the bankrupt Baumax chain, including 58 Baumax stores. Of these, 40 were leased to OBI, a major international hardware retailer. In 2023, the company further expanded its portfolio with the acquisition of the properties from the Kika-Leiner chain. In 2025, the Supernova Group expanded into the Italian market.

Frank Albert was awarded the Decoration of Honour for Services to the Republic of Austria (German: Grosses Ehrenzeichen für Verdienste um die Republik Österreich) for his business endeavors and socially oriented wind-down of Baumax AG in September 2018.

== Decorations and awards ==
- 2018: Decoration of Honour for Services to the Republic of Austria: Grand Decoration of Honour
