= Signa Holding =

Austrian real estate, retail and media conglomerate

SIGNA Holding GmbH
- Type: Private
- Industry: Real estate, retail, media
- Founded: 2000; 26 years ago in Innsbruck, Austria
- Founder: René Benko
- Defunct: 2023
- Fate: Undergoing restructuring due to insolvency in 2023
- Headquarters: Innsbruck, Austria
- Key people: Ernst Dieter Berninghaus (chairman of the Executive Board); René Benko (chairman of the Advisory Board)
- Website: www.signa.at

Signa Holding GmbH (stylized SIGNA) was Austria's largest privately owned real estate company. Signa Holding GmbH announced insolvency proceedings at the end of November 2023. The company will apply for self-administration and restructuring in Vienna's Commercial Court.

Signa was founded in 2000 by the Tyrolean entrepreneur René Benko. Over the years, it has become a pan-European real estate group with more than 150 employees and offices in Vienna, Innsbruck, Munich, Düsseldorf, Luxembourg, Zurich, Bolzano, Berlin and Hamburg. The principal focus of the group is long-term investment in real estate in prime city centre locations. The firm has also become the biggest owner of malls in Central Europe with over 46,000 employees.

== Structure ==
In 2013, Signa extended its activities on merchandising by acquiring majority stakes in the German sporting goods specialist Karstadt sports and in Karstadt Premium. In the summer of 2014, Signa took over Karstadt Warenhaus.

Since 2013 Signa operates in two independent business segments. In 2018 a third segment with "Signa Media" was added.

Signa Real Estate	Signa Retail	Signa Media
Within Signa Real Estate, over 150 employees manage a real estate portfolio of around €6 billion out of ten offices in Austria, Germany, Italy and Switzerland. Real estate operations are organised in four distinct divisions: Signa Prime Selection AG; Long term ownership of exceptional city-centre properties in European highstreets Signa Property Funds; Closed-end real estate funds Signa Development; Traditional project development Signa Recap; Real estate investment products	Signa Retail holds and manages all merchandising activities with stakes in three of the largest German retail companies. Over 20.000 people working in over 100 locations generate annual revenues of over €3 billion.: Karstadt Sports; Number 2 German sporting goods retailer: Karstadt Warenhaus; German department store group: The KaDeWe Group; Operator of premium department stores in the legendary KaDeWe in Berlin, Alsterhaus in Hamburg and Oberpollinger in Munich. (49% owned by Signa): Outfitter: Multi-Channel-retailer for sport equipment and fashion in Germany; dress-for-less GmbH: Online-Outlet for fashion; internetstores: Online-retailer for outdoor and bicycle gear; Tennis-Point: Multi-Channel-retailer for tennis gear; Eataly; Probikeshop: Online-Bike-Retailer in France and Southeurope; hood.de: Online-retailer; Mybestbrands: Online-fashion-mall; Sportscheck; Globus (Swiss malls)	In late 2018 the Signa Holding bought 49% of the foreign company shares from the "Funke Mediengruppe". Through this investment Signa owns part of the two biggest Austrian newspapers: Kronen Zeitung; Kurier

The group of companies covers real estate assets worth more than 14 billion euros. The current development volume is about 8 billion euros. The Signa Group is not only active in its core markets of Austria and Germany but also in Italy, Switzerland, Luxembourg, Belgium and the Czech Republic. In an interview in February 2020 René Benko talked about total assets of 25 billion Euro.

=== Corporate structure and management ===
The principal shareholder of Signa Holding is the Familie Benko Privatstiftung which holds 85% of all company shares. Ernst Tanner, the manager of Lindt & Sprüngli, holds another 10% of shares. The final 5% are owned by Torsten Töller, manager of Fressnapf. The Greek ship owner George Economou exited the company in 2015.

The management of Signa Holding GmbH is the responsibility of the two CEOs Christoph Stadlhuber and Marcus Mühlberger. Since the beginning of 2013 the operational and strategic management of the Signa Group has been the responsibility of the Group Executive Board (GEB) whose five members are the CEOs of the core areas and the Group CFO. The GEB deals not only with the operations of the individual core areas but also with cross-company matters including group strategy and coordination as well as fundraising.

=== Advisory board of Signa Holding ===
The advisory board does not have an official corporate law function, but it is considered the body that determines the strategic lines in Signa. The chairman of this advisory board: company founder René Benko. The members: Alfred Gusenbauer, former SPÖ chancellor, said he was friends with Benko. He was member of the advisory board of Signa Holding. Susanne Riess-Hahn, former FPÖ Vice Chancellor, was also on the Signa Holding advisory board. The advisory board also includes: ex-Raiffeisen banker Karl Sevelda and ex-Casinos Austria director Karl Stoss.

=== Selected of real estate assets ===
The new headquarters of the German Stock Exchange in Eschborn near Frankfurt, the luxury department store KaDeWe in Berlin, Alsterhaus in Hamburg and Oberpollinger in Munich city centre site in Munich, and objects in Vienna's pedestrian zone and Mariahilfer Straße belong to the Signa portfolio, as do the Sevens shopping centre on Düsseldorf's Königsallee w In Austria, Kaufhaus Tyrol and the properties of the Goldenes Quartier in Vienna and one of the buildings which houses Meinl am Graben belong to the Signa portfolio. In December 2013 it was announced that Signa had acquired the Wiener Postsparkasse, the headquarters of Bawag P.S.K., and rented it back to the bank long-term. The Hotel Bauer Palazzo on the Grand Canal in Venice was acquired in 2020 by Benko's Signa group adding to its hotel portfolio which includes the Park Hyatt Vienna, The Chalet N in Lech am Arlberg, and the Villa Eden luxury resort at Lake Garda in Italy.

== History ==
The Signa Holding was founded in the year 2000 and emerged from the previous company Immofinna from René Benko. In the modest beginnings the company focused on renovating lofts. In 2001 Karl Kovarik joined the company and the first office in Vienna was opened. In 2004 the construction of the shopping mall Kaufhaus Tyrol started. In the following years offices in Munich, Zürich and Luxembourg opened. In this time also large property, like the Deutsche Börse in Frankfurt, were added to the portfolio.

=== Since 2012: The Karstadt takeover ===
Karstadt Premium GmbH, Karstadt Sports GmbH and Karstadt Warenhaus GmbH and their sub-divisions were taken over in a series of steps. At the end of December 2012 a portfolio of 17 Karstadt department stores including the Kaufhaus des Westens (KaDeWe) in Berlin was acquired by Signa Prime Selection AG for a sum of over 1.1 billion euros. The transaction was by far the largest retail real estate investment in Germany in 2012. On 16 September 2013 it was disclosed that Signa, together with the BSG Group, had taken over 75.1% of the operative business of Karstadt-Premium-GmbH and 75.1% of the operative business of Karstadt-Sports-GmbH from the Berggruen Holding of the German-American businessman Nicolas Berggruen for 300 million euros. This sum was to be spent on the strengthening of the Karstadt Group and the modernisation of individual stores with the aim of guaranteeing Karstadt's long-term competitiveness. In November 2013 Signa passed on half of its shares – that is to say 37.55% - in Karstadt Premium and the sports shops, to the Israeli businessman Beny Steinmetz. Karstadt Premium operates the three luxury department stores Kaufhaus des Westens in Berlin, Alsterhaus in Hamburg and Oberpollinger in Munich. With its 28 sports shops, Karstadt Sports is one of Germany's leading retailers of sporting goods. On 15 August 2014 Signa Holding acquired 100% of the shares in Karstadt Warenhaus GmbH and the remaining shares in Karstadt Premium GmbH and Karstadt Sports GmbH. The deal marked the final withdrawal of Berggruen Holdings from the operations of the Karstadt Group and from i the ownership of individual Karstadt properties.

In the financial year 2015/16 the Karstadt group managed to earn the first profit in years. In the following year the profit broke the one million euro mark. The future focus will include the online business.

=== Since 2016: Further expansions ===
==== Participation in Outfitter ====
In April 2016, Signa Retail acquired a majority stake in Outfitter, one of the leading sports multi-channel providers. As part of this investment, Signa Retail acquired 60% of Outfitter - the remaining 40% remained with Ron Berger. The founder and former sole shareholder will thus continue to be significantly involved and, together with his managing director Maximilian Albert, will continue to operate the business. The plan is to create conditions for the desired market leadership in Germany with the coupling of Karstadt Sports and Outfitter.

==== Acquisition of dress-for-less ====
In August 2016, Signa took over 100% of the designer fashion online outlet dress-for-less, a company founded in 1999 with a presence in thirteen countries, principally in the D-A-CH (Germany, Austria and Switzerland) region and in the Netherlands. In 2011, the Spanish-based shopping club Privalia acquired the German company. In November 2015, Privalia withdrew and the management team, headed by managing director Antonio Gonzalo, took over the company. In the meantime, Mirco Schultis - founder of dress-for-less in 1998 - returned to the role of CEO. Sandra Rehm has been managing the company since July 2017. The company employs around 260 people at its headquarters in Kelsterbach, Hesse. The dispatch of the commodity takes place over 60 countries.

==== Takeover of Internet stores ====
At the beginning of November 2016, Signa Retail acquired an 87% stake in the specialist mail-order company for bicycle and outdoor products, called Internet stores. The entire management remained on board: Markus Winter. took over as CEO t r 1 October 2016 T As of 2017, Internetstores is active with online shops in 14 European countries. The outdoor portfolio includes the German online retailer Campz and the Swedish internet company Addnature. In the bicycle segment, Internet stores with Fahrrad.de and Brügelmann are mainly active in Germany, with bikers across Europe.

==== Takeover of Tennis Point ====
At the end of 2016, Signa acquired a 78% majority stake in the multi-channel retailer Tennis-Point in the sporting goods retail sector. Company founders Christian Miele and Thomas Welle continue to manage the company and retain 22% of the shares. With its range of more than 12,000 tennis and running articles from more than 100 different sports brands, private labels and exclusive brands, Tennis-Point has a wide range of products that are distributed in the 19 online shops and the 12 branches at various locations in the DACH region.

==== Joint venture for Karstadt München Bahnhofplatz ====
In a central location in Munich, between the main station and Stachus, Signa Real Estate went in October 2016 in a joint venture with the partner RFR Holding GmbH and has participated in the famous department store ensemble Karstadt München Bahnhofplatz.

=== Since 2018 ===
On 11 September 2018 Signa acquired the majority of the department store chain Galeria Kaufhof from Canada's Hudson's Bay Company, which had bought the chain in 2013. This takeover allowed Signa to merge its Karstadt department store chain with Galeria Kaufhof. In June 2019 the shares in Galeria Kaufhof still held by the Hudson's Bay Company, were bought by Signa Holding.

In June 2019 Signa confirmed, that the French investment holding Société Foncière, Financière et de Participations, which manages the equity stakes of the Peugeot-family, acquired a 5% stake in Signa Prime Selection for €186 million.

The New York-based investment company Madison acquired a 5% stake in Signa Prime Selection AG in July 2019.

On 29 November 2023, the group declared insolvency as a result of dropping property values and increased debt loads.

== Signa bankruptcies in 2023 ==
In November 2023, Signa Holding's shareholders and lenders confirmed that Benko would step down from the board of directors. Signa Prime Selection GmbH was placed in receivership following an insurmountable liquidity crisis: an extraordinary debt charge of 10.3 billion euros as well as the impossibility of honoring all its loans and debt as of November 2023. Most assets belonging to Signa have subsequently been sold or have entered receivership; these include Signa Sport United in the US and Kaufhof in Germany and Austria. Hamburg's immense Elbtower, still under construction, is currently being auctioned to various lending institutions. Benko himself is now under investigation in Austria, Germany and Italy for fraudulent bankruptcy and money laundering.

In December 2023, the subsidiary Signa Prime also went bankrupt. Der Spiegel reported on 8 December 2023 that Signa's management was preparing for self-administration insolvency, citing insiders. This included Signa's most exclusive properties, including well-known buildings such as Berlin's KaDeWe and Vienna's Goldene Quartier. The 800-foot-high Elbtower in Hamburg is also part of Signa Prime Selection AG. The construction of the skyscraper was halted in November 2023.

=== Arrest of Benko ===
In January 2025, René Benko was arrested for his alleged attempt to conceal Signa Holding assets from investigators.

== Business segments ==
=== Signa Real Estate ===
Signa Real Estate office locations 2019

==== Takeover of BAI ====
At the beginning of January 2017, Signa Real Estate announced that it was taking over the renowned Viennese developer BAI Bauträger Austria Immobilien GmbH. BAI Bauträger Austria Immobilien GmbH is a property developer with a current investment volume of around €1.7 billion, a portfolio of currently 18 projects and a project development volume of more than 440,000 m². As part of the BAI Group, its own service companies for project development and property development (BAI), brokers (BAReal) and a property management company (Donath) are also being acquired and continued by the new owners. The declared future goal for the BAI under the new ownership is to become an independent developer of affordable housing in Vienna.

==== Sale of large office projects in Austria ====
In the summer of 2017, the Signa project The Icon Vienna was sold to the new Vienna Central Station as part of a forward deal to Allianz. At the beginning of October, the first three components of the office project Austria Campus were sold to PGIM Real Estate. With a volume of over 500 million euros, the deal was the largest real estate transaction of 2017 and the largest office real estate transaction in Austria by that time.

==== Capital increase by Signa Prime Selection AG ====
Also at the beginning of October 2017, an increase in shareholder capital of Signa Prime Selection AG, which has real estate in good inner-city locations in Germany, Austria and northern Italy, was carried out at 1 billion euro. Signa's existing investors, the private foundation of Hans Peter Haselsteiner and Niki Lauda's Family Office as well as new investors subscribed to the shares.

==== Purchase RFR portfolio in Germany ====
In November, Signa Prime Selection AG acquired a portfolio consisting of five properties: the Upper West in Berlin, the Kaufmannshaus and the Alsterarkaden in Hamburg, the project development Upper Zeil in Frankfurt and 50% RFR participation of the Karstadt project at the Munich railway station. The other 50% were already owned by Signa Prime. The volume of the transaction was around 1.5 billion euros and was the largest property deal in Germany in 2017.

At the beginning of December, Deloitte's headquarters, formerly owned by Signa Funds, became BNP Paribas Real Estate. In mid-December, the Schickler Haus, an office complex in Berlin Mitte, was acquired.

==== Participation in S Immo AG ====
In December 2017, it was announced that the S-Immo shareholder Ronny Pecik has signed an agreement with Signa Holding, which entitles them to take over its entire shareholding of 21.86 percent. At the beginning of April 2018, the Vienna Insurance Group (VIG) sold its stake of 10.22 percent in S Immo AG, which it held i through its subsidiary Sparkassen Versicherung AG.

In the course of this, the Benko Privatstiftung family took over 7.28 percent of the VIG share package, and at that time, including the right of first refusal, contributed 21.86 percent to S Immo AG with a total of 29.14 percent. 7In mid-April 2018, Ronny Pecik and the Signa Group sold the entire 29.14 percent stake in S Immo to Immofinanz.

==== Takeover APA tower ====
In October 2018, it was announced that BAI Bauträger Austria Immobilien GmbH, part of Signa Holding, had bought the former home of the Austria Press Agency (APA). The old skyscraper with 82 meters is to give way to residential construction projects, .

==== Joint venture to buy the Chrysler Building ====
In March 2019 the Signa Holding partnered with RFR Holding to buy the Chrysler Building in New York for an estimated amount of 150 million US-Dollars.

=== Signa Retail ===
==== 2017 ====
In April, Signa Sports Group and its subsidiary internetstores acquired 100% of Probikeshop - an online bike retailer founded in 2005 in Saint-Étienne in France and Southern Europe.

In mid-June 2017, the company acquired the majority (70%) of the online marketplace Hood.de and 60% of the online platform Mybestbrands.

==== 2018 ====
At the end of February 2018, the takeover of Stylefile, an online shop for sportswear takes place.

In April 2018, Signa Sports Group - one of the four trading platforms of Signa Retail - announced that it was re-appointing the company. Dr. Stephan Zoll, former Managing Director of eBay in Germany and Member of the Management of eBay in Europe, will take over the position of CEO of the Signa Sports Group as of 1 July 2018.

Karstadt CEO Stephan Fanderl announced in May 208 that the department store group in Berlin-Tegel would open a new branch - the first new location in three decades.

Berlin-Tegel will not remain the only new Karstadt branch, as the department store chain will inaugurate a new department store in Gropius Passagen in Berlin this autumn. Here, as it were, a location was continued which Kaufhof closed last year. It is the largest shopping center in the German capital, with Karstadt being the anchor tenant with an area of approx. 7,900 m² will be built on three floors.

On 1 June 2018, Christian Bubenheim was hired as the new CEO of the online handler for outdoor and bicycle products internetstores. As a result, the manager of Autoscout24 switched to Signa Retail.

On 15 June 2018 it was announced that Benkos Signa bought the financially troubled furniture chain Kika / Leiner. The participation saved the traditional Austrian furniture store from the crisis. Reinhold Gütebier took over the management of the furniture store chains after the purchase.

==== 2019 ====
In June 2019, the sports trading division of Signa Holding took over the French online retailer of tennis products called Tennis Pro.

In November 2019, it was announced that Signa Holding's retail division will take over the travel agencies and the online platform of Thomas Cook Germany, thus securing the jobs of the insolvent tour operator for the time being.

In December 2019, it was announced that Galeria Karstadt Kaufhof will take over the sports retailer Sportscheck from the Otto Group. This will expand the Signa Retail division by a further 1,300 employees and 300 million annual sales.

==== 2020 ====
In early February 2020, it was announced that the Signa Group, in collaboration with the Central Group, would take over the magazines on Globus from Migros. The collaboration between Signa and Central Group continues with the recent acquisition of Selfridges in 2021, with each company hold 50% stake.

In February 2020, Signa Retail ranked 124th among the world's largest retailers with annual sales of $ 8.5 billion.

=== Signa Media ===
In November 2018, the acquisition of 49% stake in the German Funke media group in the Austrian daily newspapers "Kronen Zeitung" and "Kurier" by Signa Holding was announced, the first investment in the media sector.

=== Signa Innovations ===
This business unit of Signa Holding is engaged in the identification of promising projects in the field of real estate digitalization. A n this context, a cooperation has already been entered into with the Vienna Economic Chamber.

In September 2018, the Viennese start-up Storebox secured a seven-digit investment from Signa Innovations. The concept of the company is aimed at a close-knit warehouse network, which could become more important in times of increasing mail order business.

This startup relies on methods of digital transformation to evaluate real estate objects. In December, an investment by Signa Innovations in the new company was announced. Again, a seven-digit amount should be invested.

== Miscellaneous ==
On 13 May 2013 it was disclosed that Strabag boss Hans Peter Haselsteiner had - via his private family trust - taken a share in Signa Prime Selection AG. The prominent business figures who hold shares in Signa Prime include Roland Berger, Wendelin Wiedeking, Ernst Tanner, Harti Weirather and Torsten Toeller.

In January 2024, the list of Benko's creditors also included numerous Volksbanks, Raiffeisenbanks, savings banks, Private banks and insurance companies.
