= René Benko =

Businessman; founder and chairman of Signa Holding Advisory Board

- René Benko at a trial in Innsbruck, 2026
- Born: 20 May 1977 (age 49); Innsbruck, Tyrol, Austria
- Occupations: Real estate, media and retail investor
- Years active: 1999–present
- Known for: Founder of Signa Holding
- Term: 2013–present
- Children: 4
- Website: Profile at SIGNA Group

René Benko (born 20 May 1977) is an Austrian former real estate developer, media proprietor, investor, and founder of Signa Holding, considered to be Austria's largest privately held real estate conglomerate. Benko was once regarded as one of the richest Austrians. Numerous controversies have surrounded Benko's professional career, and in March 2024, Benko declared personal insolvency.

He previously had close connection with many Austrian political leaders. In April 2024, the Liechtenstein public prosecutor's office announced that it had initiated criminal proceedings against Benko. In Italy, the local public prosecutor's office in Trento issued an arrest warrant for Benko in December 2024 and searched a number of his private offices and apartments. Italian authorities justified their actions based on ongoing investigations of real estate speculation by Benko in the province of Trentino and in neighboring South Tyrol.

On 23 January 2025, Benko was arrested. The Austrian Central Office for the Prosecution of Economic Crimes and Corruption (German: Wirtschafts- und Korruptionsstaatsanwaltschaft) stated that his arrest was related to suspicion of fraud and corruption as well as the risk of obfuscation.

On 15 October 2025 Benko was sentenced to two years' imprisonment in Austria for financial fraud.

== Life ==
Benko was born in Innsbruck, Tyrol, the son of a local government employee and a nursery schoolteacher. At the age of 17 he gained his first experience of the real estate sector in a building company owned by an acquaintance.

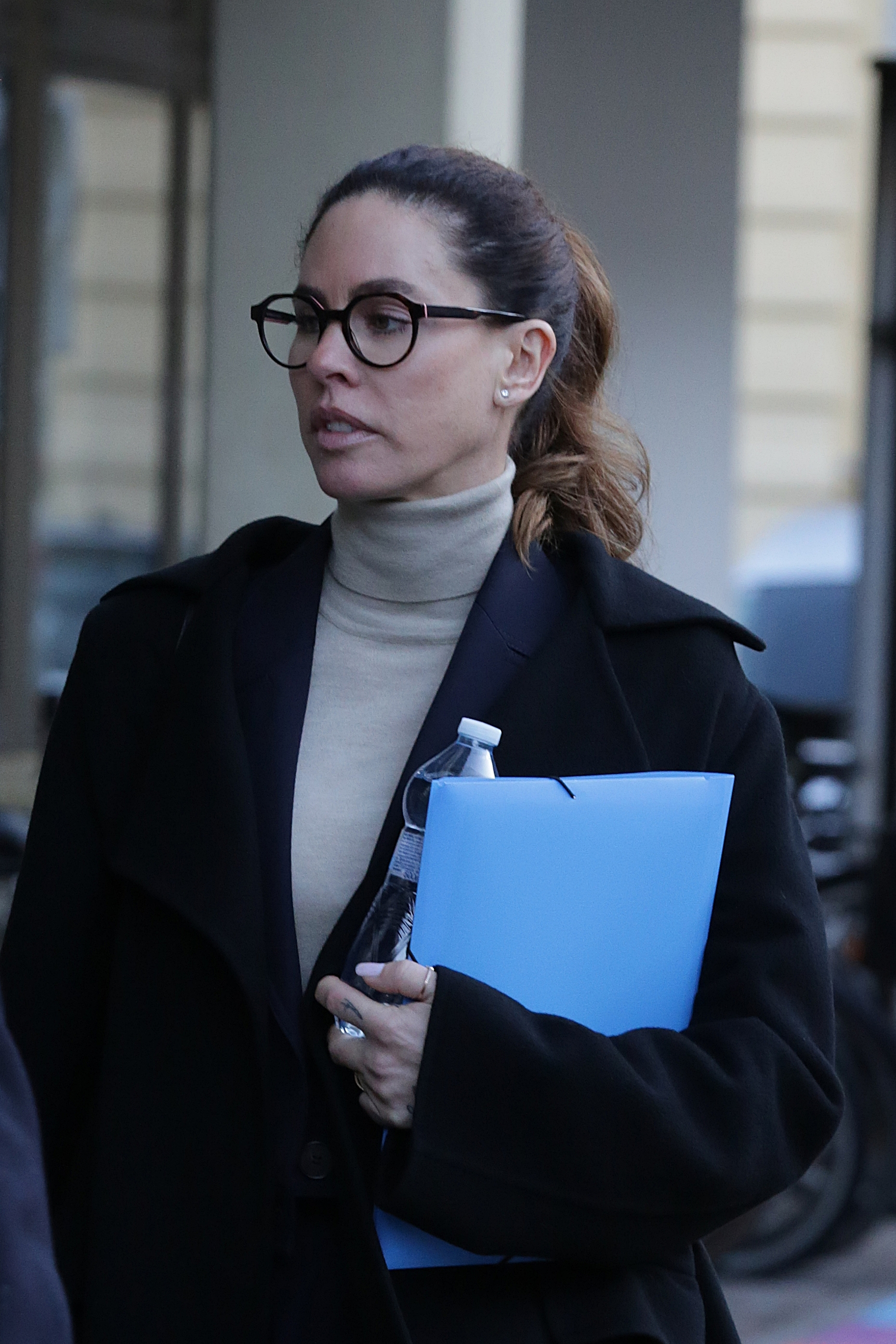
Nathalie Benko, 2025

Benko lives mainly in Innsbruck. He has married twice, is now married to the former model Nathalie Benko and has four children. Otherwise, little is known of Benko's private life.

Part of his assets are held by Benko's private foundation, named "Laura" after his daughter Laura.

In 2024, Benko was forced to sell his private yacht, Roma. It had been estimated in 2023 to be worth around 40 million euros.

In June 2021, Benko's foundation purchased a Picasso painting, L'Étreinte (1969). The foundation authorised the New York–based auction house Sotheby's in October 2024 to sell the work; it was purchased in January 2025 for about 11 million euros.

== Network ==
Before his bankruptcy, Benko maintained an extensive network of contacts in Austrian politics. Alfred Gusenbauer, former SPÖ chancellor, said he was friends with Benko. He was a member of the advisory board of Signa Holding. Susanne Riess-Hahn, former FPÖ vice chancellor, was also on Signa Holding's advisory board.

== Business activities ==
=== Foundation and first investments ===
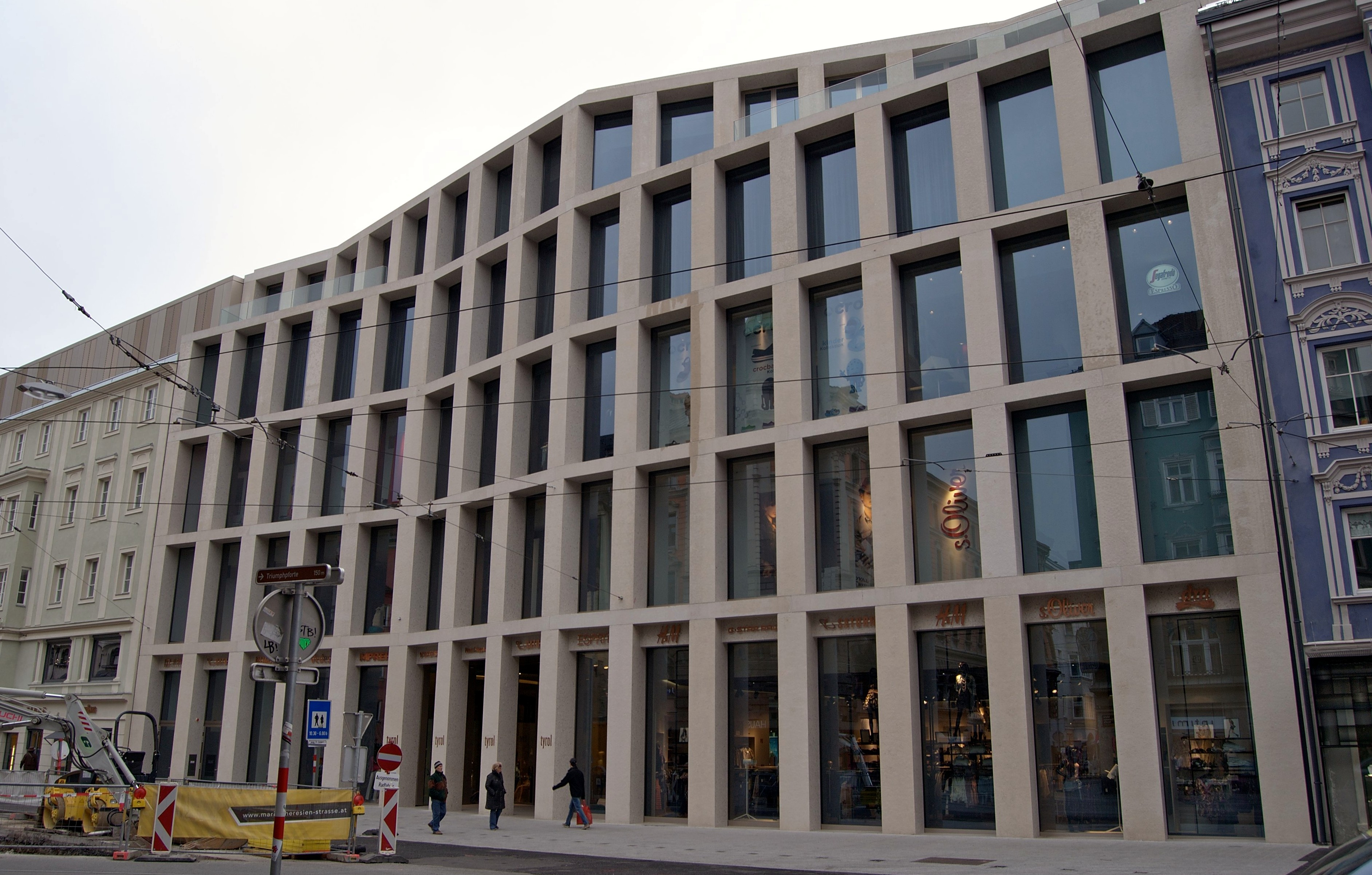
Kaufhaus Tyrol department store

At the end of 1999, Benko founded the two-person company Immofina Holding, renamed Signa Holding in 2006.

The company's first projects included the extension of attics into luxury apartments and the profitable purchase and sale of the health hotel Lanserhof in the Austrian city of Lans. After these successes, the Viennese entrepreneur Karl Kovarik, who inherited several gas stations, contributed to the first financial jump-start with 25 million euros.

In 2007, Signa Holding set out to purchase 16 central-city properties from the portfolio of BAWAG P.S.K. bank and to open medical centers in Vienna. It acquired the Kaufhaus Tyrol, which was completely renovated between 2007 and 2010. The planning of the latter was carried out by the renowned architect David Chipperfield. In 2008, the former headquarters of Länderbank and Bank Austria became the property of Signa and was converted into the Park Hyatt Vienna hotel. In 2011, the company bought the Oberpollinger department store in Munich. Furthermore, a portfolio of buildings consisting of KaDeWe and Karstadt properties was acquired in 2012. Following these investments, Signa bought the commercial businesses of KaDeWe in 2013, and Karstadt in 2014.

=== Expansion towards a holding company ===
On 18 June 2013, shortly before his conviction for bribery was confirmed by the Austrian criminal appeals court, René Benko retired from the operational leadership of Signa Holding and took over the chairmanship of the Advisory Board of the Signa Group. His bribery conviction, a suspended 12-month prison sentence, was later confirmed by the Austrian Supreme Court.

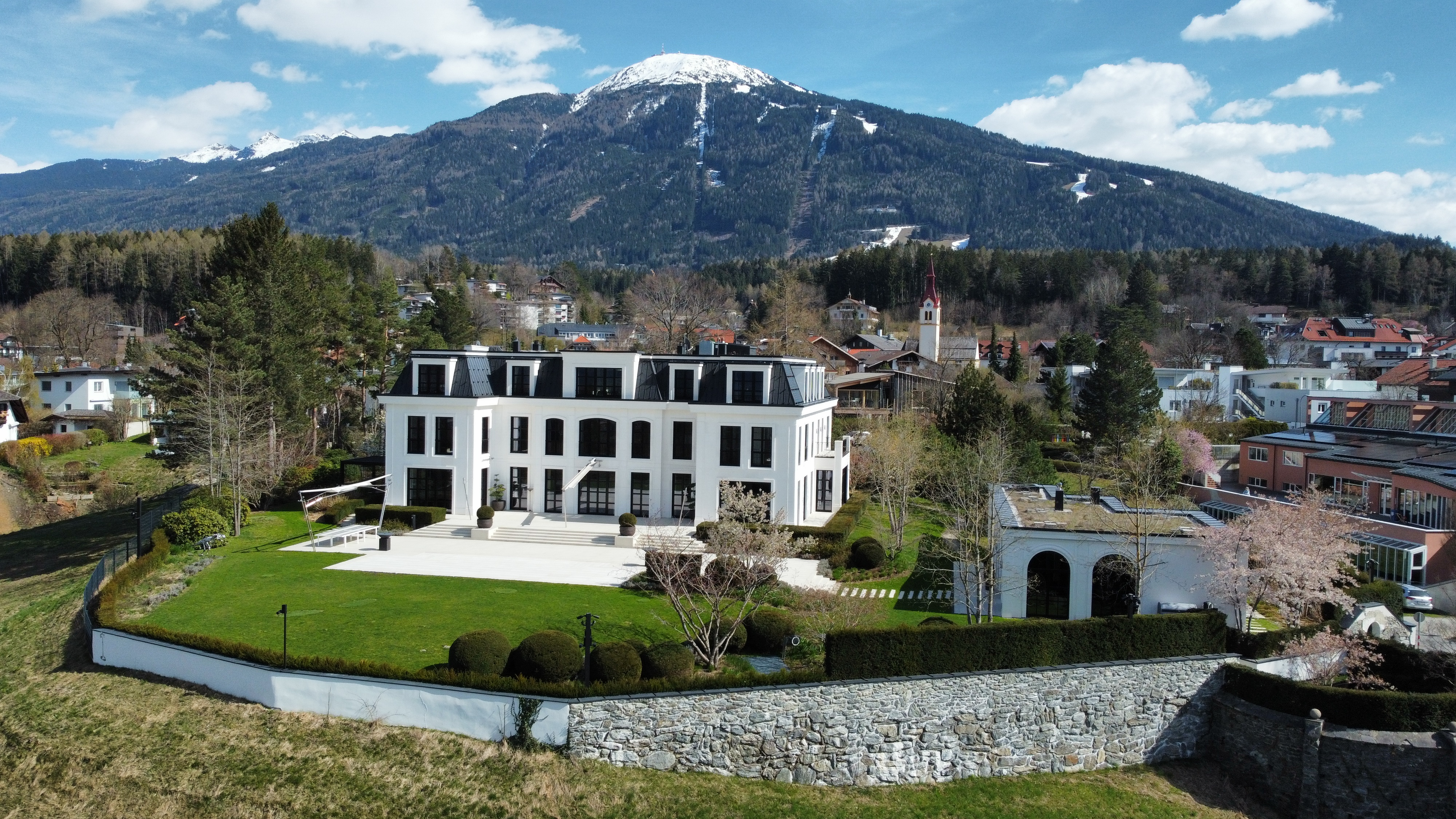
Benkos former villa in Igls, Austria

In 2013, the new company division Signa Retail was founded. With the acquisition of the Karstadt department store chain in 2014, as well as several online and multichannel retailers, Benko's Signa Holding became a significant company in the retail sector. Since 2014, several projects were completed in Austria and other European countries. Another milestone was the approval by local referendum of the construction of the WaltherPark shopping center in Bolzano, Italy in 2016. The company made further expansions in e-commerce from 2017, such as the acquisition of Probikeshop and hood.de.

After the purchase of the Austrian furniture chain Kika-Leiner (6,500 employees) in June 2018, negotiations resumed on the acquisition of the department store chain Kaufhof in July 2018 by Signa Holding under Benko's leadership. On 11 September, the merger of Karstadt and Kaufhof was officially confirmed. Soon after this merger, the public debate around the acquisition and Benko's general business practices intensified.

In November 2018, Benko's first investments in the media sector were announced with the acquisition by Signa Holding of shares in the Austrian daily newspapers Kronen Zeitung and Kurier.

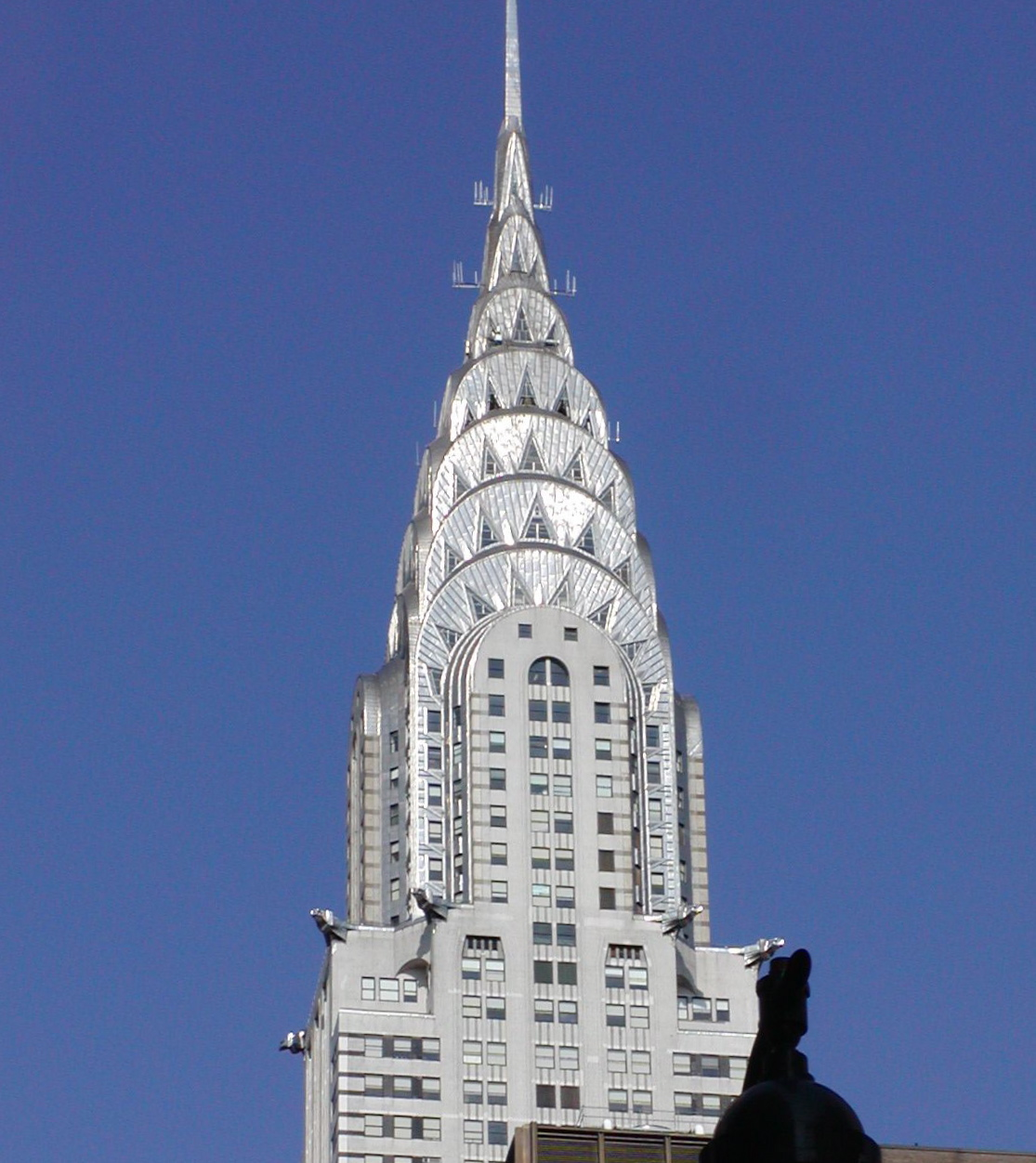
The Chrysler Building's distinctive Art Deco crown and spire

In March 2019, Signa Holding, together with RFR Holding, acquired New York City's famed 1930 Art Deco skyscraper the Chrysler Building for an estimated $150 million. This was Benko's first major investment in the United States. A month later, the Technical Commission of Italy's South Tyrol regional government approved the sale of Bolzano Airport to a company owned by Benko, Bolzano entrepreneur Josef Gostner and Strabag founder Hans Peter Haselsteiner.

In mid-2019, Benko's Signa Holding acquired the remaining shares in Galeria Kaufhof. These had been previously held by Canadian retailer Hudson's Bay Company, which thus withdrew from the European market. The French investment holding company Société Foncière, Financière et de Participations, which manages the Peugeot family's holdings, subsequently acquired a 5% stake in Signa Prime Selection for 186 million euros. The Hotel Bauer Palazzo on the Grand Canal in Venice was acquired in 2020 by Benko's Signa Group, thus expanding Benko's hotel portfolio.

In 2021, in a joint venture with Central Group, Signa acquired the Selfridges luxury department stores in the UK. This extended their already existing shared portfolio of luxury department stores in continental Europe. Moreover, Signa Sports United completed a business merger with Yucaipa Acquisition and began trading on the New York Stock Exchange on 15 December 2021.

In 2023, Signa sold 49.9% of the KaDeWe to the Central Group. The Central Group then bought the KaDeWe building on April 12, 2024 from the already-insolvent Signa for 1 billion euros, announcing that it was in formal talks to acquire Signa's interest in the KaDeWe Group. Central officially purchased 100% of the KaDeWe Group (KaDeWe, Alsterhaus and Oberpollinger) later in the year.

== Administration of Signa bankruptcies ==
In November 2023, Signa Holding's shareholders and lenders confirmed that Benko would step down from the board of directors. Signa Prime Selection GmbH was placed in receivership following an insurmountable liquidity crisis: an extraordinary debt charge of 10.3 billion euros as well as the impossibility of honoring all its loans and debt as of November 2023. Most assets belonging to Signa have subsequently been sold or have entered receivership; these include Signa Sport United in the US and Kaufhof in Germany and Austria. Hamburg's immense Elbtower skyscraper, still under construction, is currently being auctioned off to various lending institutions. Benko himself is now under investigation in Austria, Germany and Italy for fraudulent bankruptcy and money laundering.

In February 2024, The Wall Street Journal reported that "appraisers valued the company’s office properties at 41 times the income they produced in 2021.... Comparable publicly traded office companies’ property portfolios were valued around 20 to 25 times income, according to Green Street, a real-estate advisory firm."

Meanwhile, construction has been halted on the 800-foot-high Elbtower. Signa's branding still appears on the construction site's protective fence, now heavily covered by graffiti. The Munich-based car rental company Sixt recently poked fun at the bankruptcy with an AI-created advertisement that placed a fake banner across the building.

== Conviction and imprisonment ==
In January 2025, Benko was arrested by Austrian authorities on suspicion of fraud and corruption.

The case was brought by the Austrian Central Public Prosecutor. Following a trial in Vienna, Benko was found guilty of financial fraud. On 15 October 2025, he was sentenced to two years' imprisonment.

The Financial Times reported that the trial was likely to be first in a series of court cases related to Signa's collapse.

== Awards ==
- 2011: Tyrolean of the Year by the Regional Governor Günther Platter
- 2012 and 2018: Man of the Year by the Austrian Business Magazine Trend
- 2018: Strategist of the Year by the German Business Magazine Handelsblatt; Roland Berger wrote the contribution.
- 2018: Man of the Year by Across, a European business magazine for the retail and real estate industries
- 2019: Pentola d’Oro International by Il Quotidiano Immobiliare, a professional industry journal
