= Elbtower =

Skyscraper in Hamburg, Germany

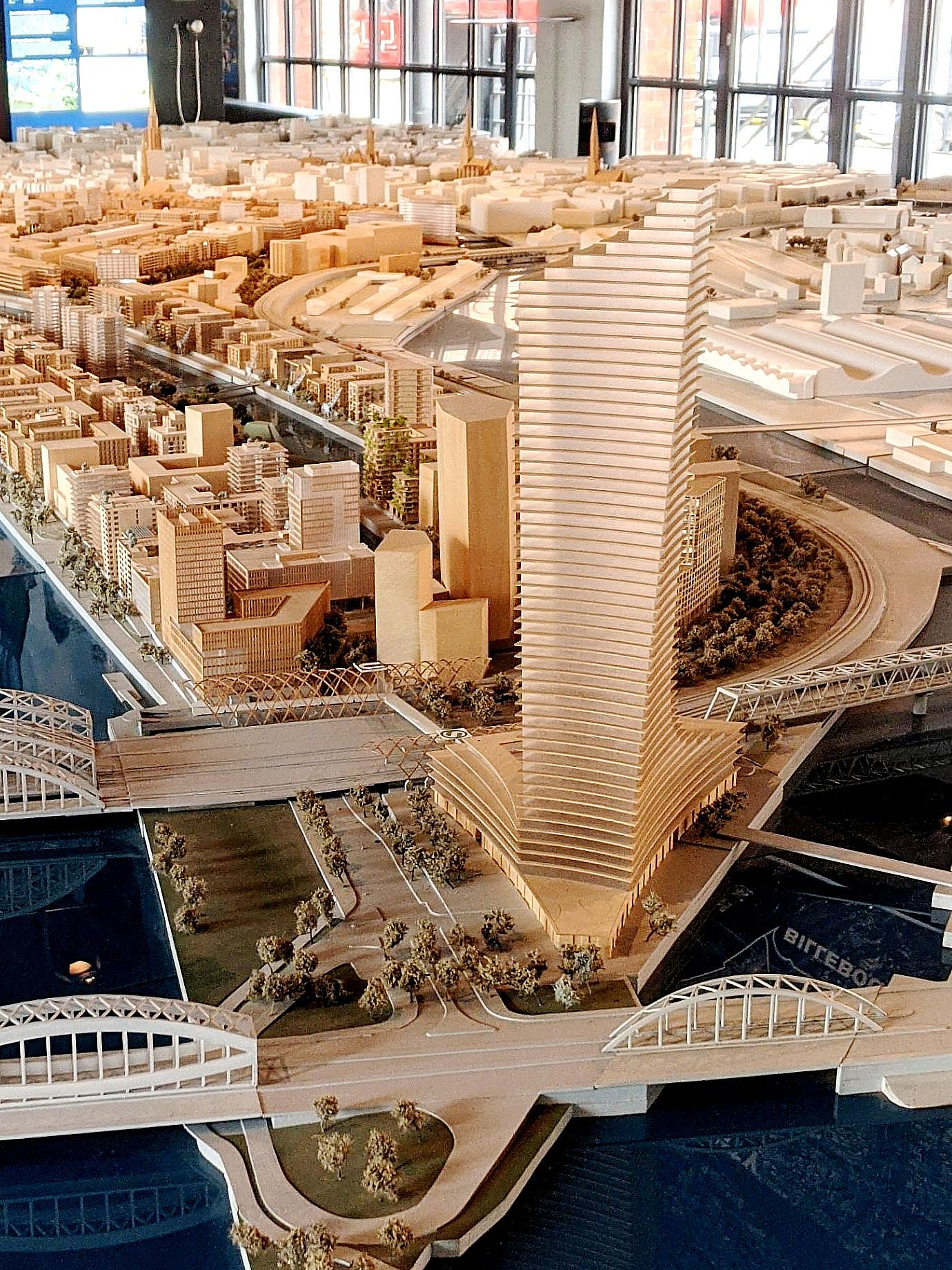

General information
- Status: On hold at 25 floors, 100 m (330 ft) high
- Type: Office, hotel
- Architectural style: Neo-futurism
- Location: HafenCity, Hamburg, Germany
- Coordinates: 53°32′5″N 10°1′34″E
- Construction started: 2021
- Construction stopped: 2023
- Cost: €700M

Height
- Height: 245 m (804 ft)

Technical details
- Floor count: 64
- Floor area: 104,000 m^{2} (1,120,000 sq ft)

Design and construction
- Architect: Christoph Felger
- Architecture firm: David Chipperfield Architects
- Developer: Signa Holding

Website
- web.archive.org/web/20230619004549/https://elbtower.de/en/

The Elbtower is a partially built skyscraper east of the HafenCity borough of Hamburg, Germany. Construction began in 2021 and was halted in 2023 due to bankruptcy of the main financier Rene Benko of Signa Holdings. If completed, the tower would have a height of 245 metres (804 ft). The tower would be, by far, the tallest building in Hamburg and the third tallest in Germany – after the Commerzbank Tower and the Messeturm, both in Frankfurt. The tower was designed by Christoph Felger from David Chipperfield Architects.

== History ==
The government of Hamburg (Senate of Hamburg) first presented the project in March 2017 at the Marché International des Professionnels de l’immobilier. Its mostly finalised design was presented in February 2018 by Hamburg's then First Mayor Olaf Scholz and representatives of the HafenCity Hamburg GmbH and its investors.

The building is being built on a prominent urban site on the north bank of the Norderelbe river and thus marks the entrance to the inner city. The site is bordered by several bridges crossing the Norderelbe.

Construction began in 2021 and was expected to be completed in 2026. According to estimates, the construction costs amount to €700 million.

The State bank Helaba played a central role in the construction project of Elbtower. As became known after the bankruptcy of the Signa Group, the government of Hamburg only wanted to sell the property on the edge of Hafencity on the condition that there were already secure tenants for part of the area. Helaba then took over the required pre-letting quota as a so-called "suitable financier". Only then did the city of Hamburg sell the property to Signa.

In November 2023, Reuters reported that construction had been halted apparently because the main developer, Signa Prime, a Rene Benko company, had failed to make its payments to Lupp, the construction company. If Signa fails to meet its contractual obligations, the City of Hamburg may issue penalties and claim repurchases rights.

In December 2023 it became public that Signa Holding is bankrupt.

In mid-November 2026, the construction company Lupp dismounted the cranes.

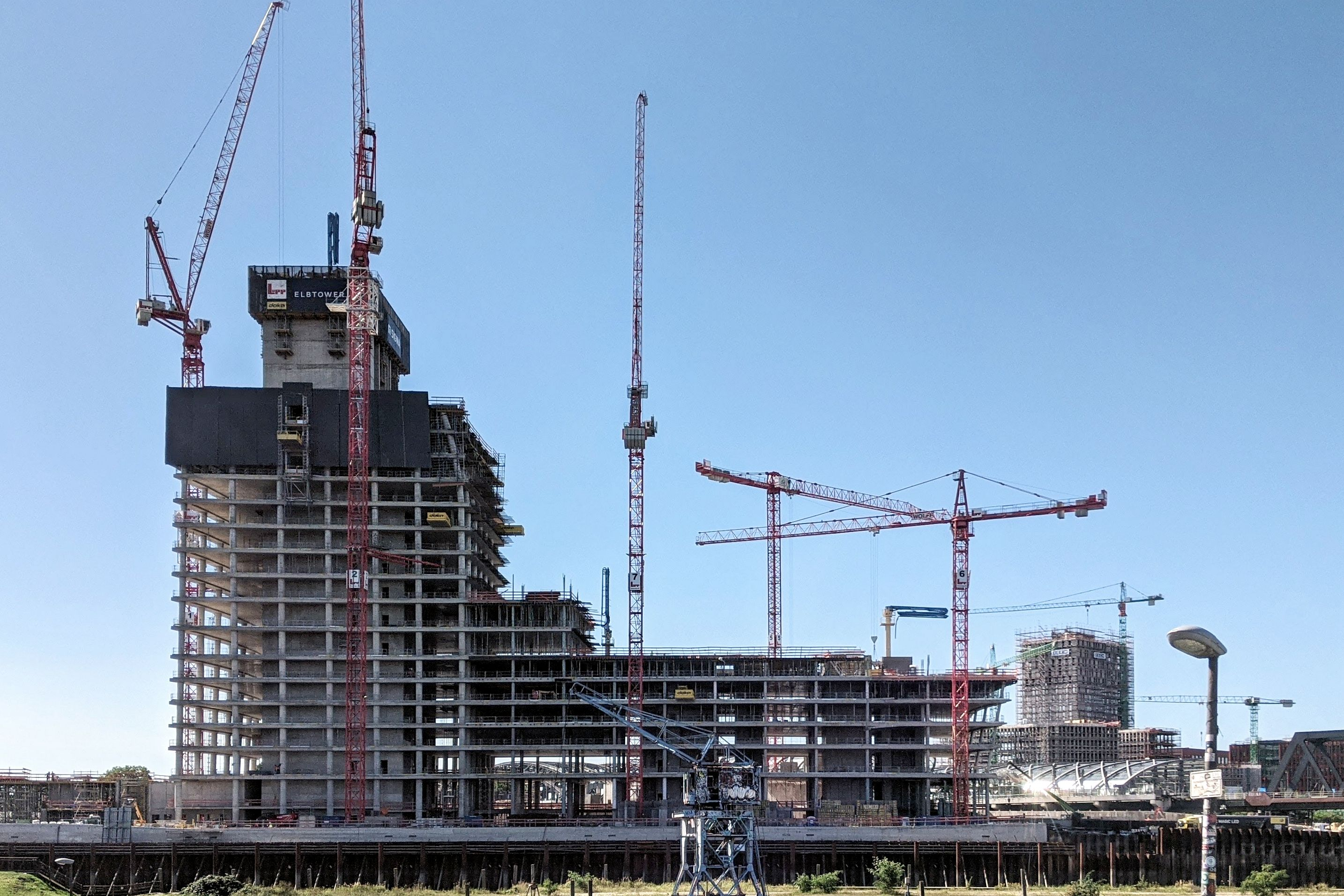
Construction site in September 2023

== Design ==
The tower was designed by Christoph Felger from David Chipperfield Architects, an English architecture firm known for a lower high-rise project in Hamburg, namely the Empire Riverside Hotel.

The Elbtower covers a footprint approximately in the shape of an isosceles right triangle, with the hypotenuse of this triangle parallel to the shore of the Upper Harbor Canal to the northeast, while the legs are to the west and south.

The design consists of a comparatively large, four to five-storey pedestal, on top of which the next six to seven floors are more and more recessed to form the base of a slender, approximately 64-storey tower figure. The top eight floors of the tower once again take up the theme of flowing gradation, gradually dodging northeast. Due to the complex geometry of the structure, depending on the place of observation, different urban development effects will result.

== Reception ==
The project received both support and opposition from the public and political representatives. Olaf Scholz, then Mayor of Hamburg, championed the project. While the ruling SPD and the opposition parties CDU and FDP welcomed these plans, the Greens expressed skepticism as a coalition partner of the SPD.

Critics pointed out that the renovation and development of existing buildings such as the Heinrich Hertz Tower (Hamburg's TV tower) and the Bismarck monument should take precedence over new prestige projects. The Senate responded to this criticism with the announcement of a transparent construction project and in particular a purely private financing of the project.

Further criticism refers to the more fundamental urban development question as to whether a skyscraper of the planned construction volume fits in with Hamburg's building tradition. There are also concerns that the project – similar to other major local and national projects, such as the Elbphilharmonie, which opened about a year before the presentation of the draft – could, depending on the contractual details, put another huge financial burden on the city.

== See also ==
- List of tallest buildings in Hamburg
- List of tallest buildings in Germany
