= Rudolph Karstadt =

German entrepreneur

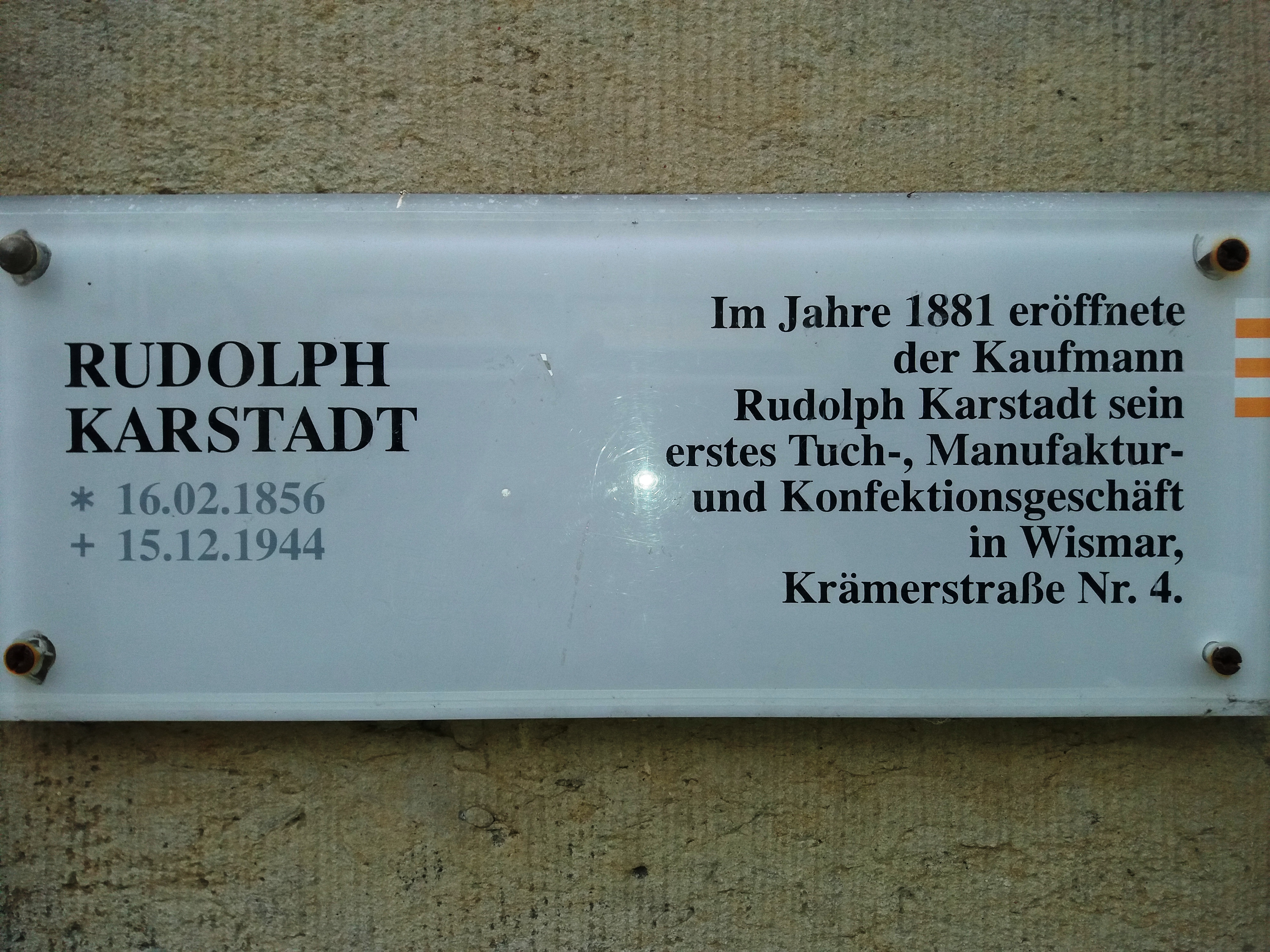
Rudolph Karstadt plaque at the first Karstadt department store in Wismar

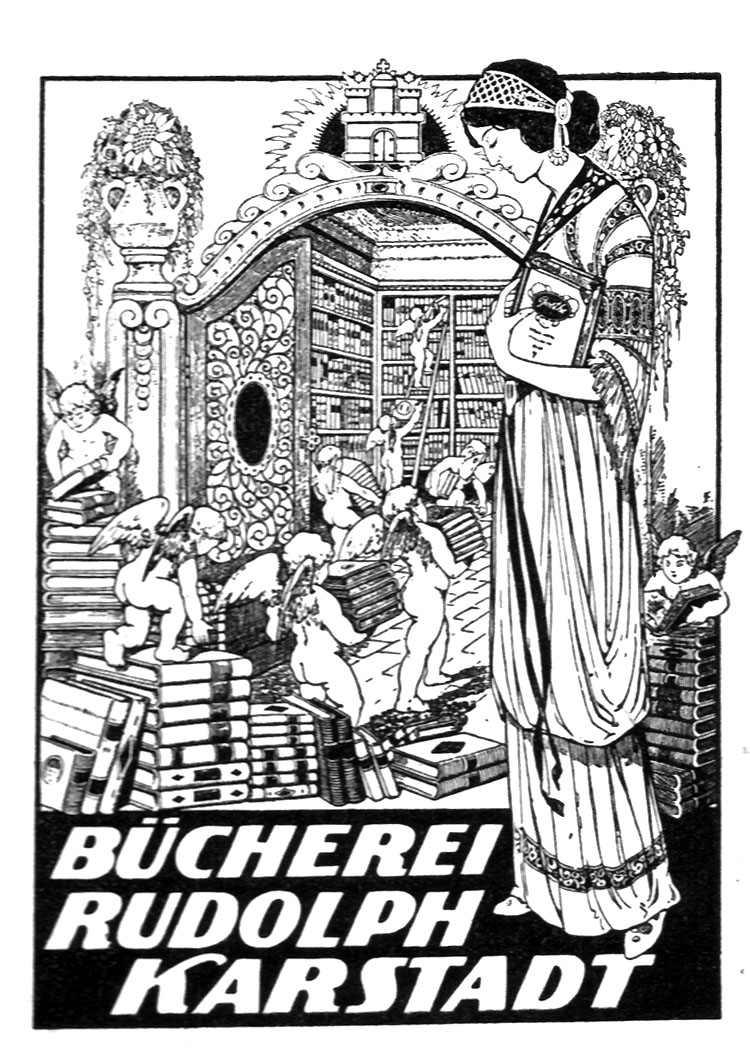
Exlibris Karstadt

Rudolph Karstadt (16 February 1856 – 15 December 1944 in Schwerin) was a German entrepreneur.

== Biography ==
Karstadt was born in Grevesmühlen near Lübeck on 16 February 1856, he apprenticed in Rostock and then worked in his father’s textile shop in Schwerin.

With a loan of 1000 thaler from his father and with the help of his two sisters, Karstadt opened his first store, ″Tuch-, Manufaktur- und Konfektionsgeschäft" at the Krämerstr. 4 in Wismar on 14 May 1881.

In 1919 Karstadt AG and Theodor Althoff KG merged.

By 1920 he owned over 30 shops across Germany. The Karstadt Warenhaus AG, which is what his chain of stores was called by 1920, continued as Arcandor from 1999 until 2009 after a merger with Quelle AG.

Karstadt lost most of his private fortune in the Great Depression and left the board of the Karstadt AG in 1932.

== See also ==
- Arcandor
- Karstadt (Bremen)
