= Karstadt =

German department store chain

Karstadt Warenhaus GmbH
- Type: Private
- Industry: Department stores, retail
- Founded: 14 May 1881; 145 years ago
- Founder: Rudolph Karstadt
- Defunct: 25 March 2019
- Successor: Galeria Karstadt Kaufhof
- Headquarters: Essen, Germany
- Key people: Eva-Lotta Sjöstedt (CEO); Miguel Müllenbach (CFO)
- Operating income: €2,673 million (2013)
- Net income: – €131.056 million (2013)
- Owner: Signa Holding
- Number of employees: 16,545 (July 2014)
- Website: www.karstadt.de

Logo of Galeria Karstadt Kaufhof since 25 March 2019

Karstadt Warenhaus GmbH (German pronunciation: [ˈkaːɐ̯ʃtat ˈvaːʁənˌhaʊs]) was a German department store chain whose headquarters were in Essen. Until 30 September 2010 the company was a subsidiary of Arcandor AG (which was known until 30 June 2007 as KarstadtQuelle AG) and was responsible within the group for the business segment of over-the-counter retail.

On 9 June 2009 Essen District Court ordered provisional asset administration and protective measures in response to an application for the opening of insolvency proceedings. It also appointed a provisional insolvency administrator. The insolvency proceedings were opened on 1 September 2009. On 7 June 2010 the board of creditors resolved to sell Karstadt Warenhaus GmbH to the investor Nicolas Berggruen. Berggruen had taken over all Karstadt stores by 1 October 2010. This had been determined by Essen District Court on 3 September 2010. On 14 August 2014 it was announced that Karstadt had been completely taken over by Signa Holding of the Austrian investor René Benko, which already owned the majority of the sports shops and premium stores.

Karstadt Warenhaus GmbH consisted of 83 department stores, 4 bargain centres, 2 branches of K Town and the online shop karstadt.de. The 28 sports shops belonged to Karstadt Sports GmbH. The company used to own three premium stores - Oberpollinger in Munich, Alsterhaus in Hamburg and Kaufhaus des Westens (KaDeWe) in Berlin which, with a sales area of 60,000 square metres, is both the largest German and second largest European department store. They now belong to The KaDeWe Group, in which Karstadt's owner Signa Holding has a 49% minority shareholding.

On 25 March 2019 Karstadt & Galeria Kaufhof launched their merged company, Galeria Karstadt Kaufhof, based in Essen, with a new logo and a new website galeria.de. HBC CEO Helena Foulkes said the two companies were excited to bring together two "iconic banners to create Germany's leading retail business."

== History ==
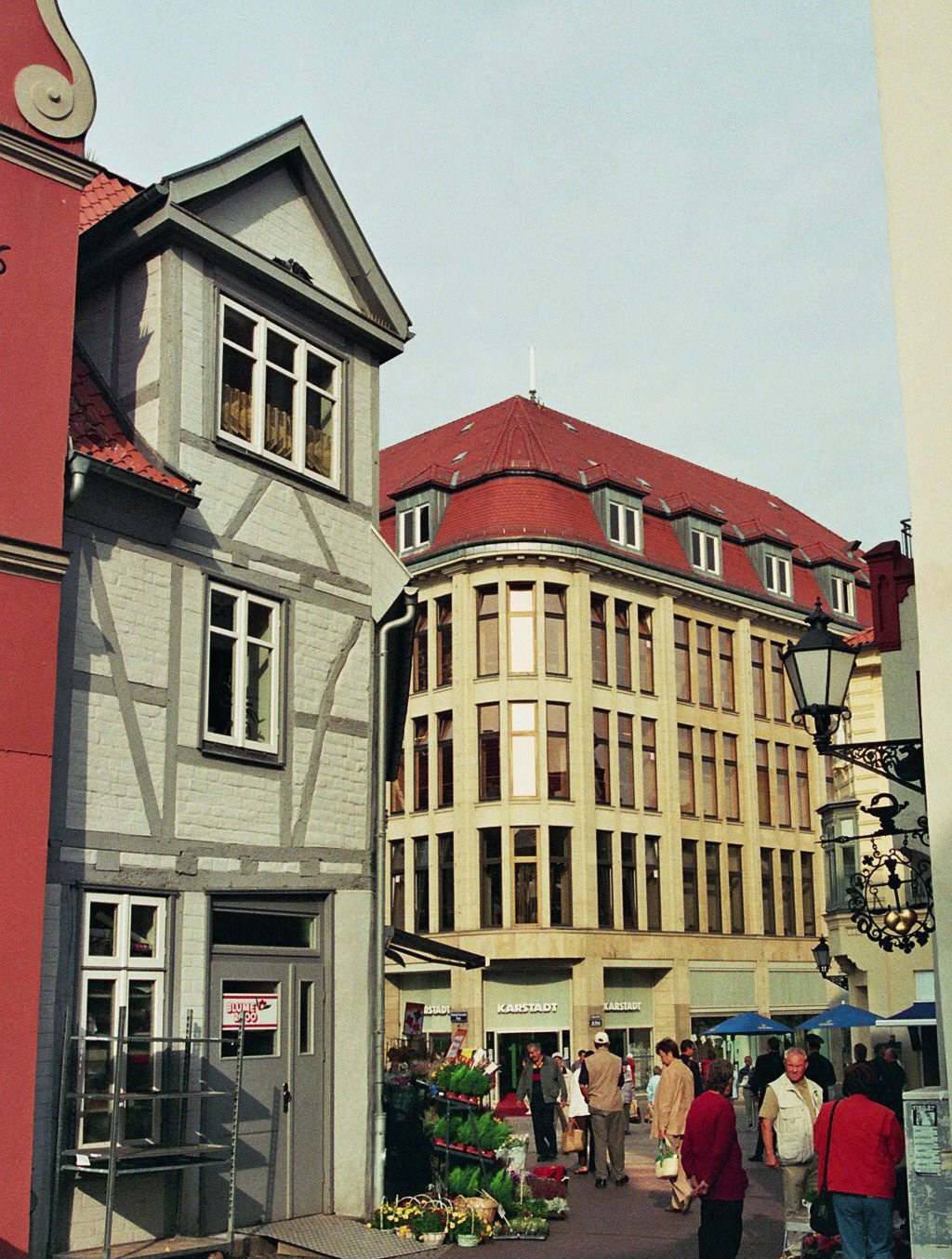
The first Karstadt department store opened in Wismar in 1881.

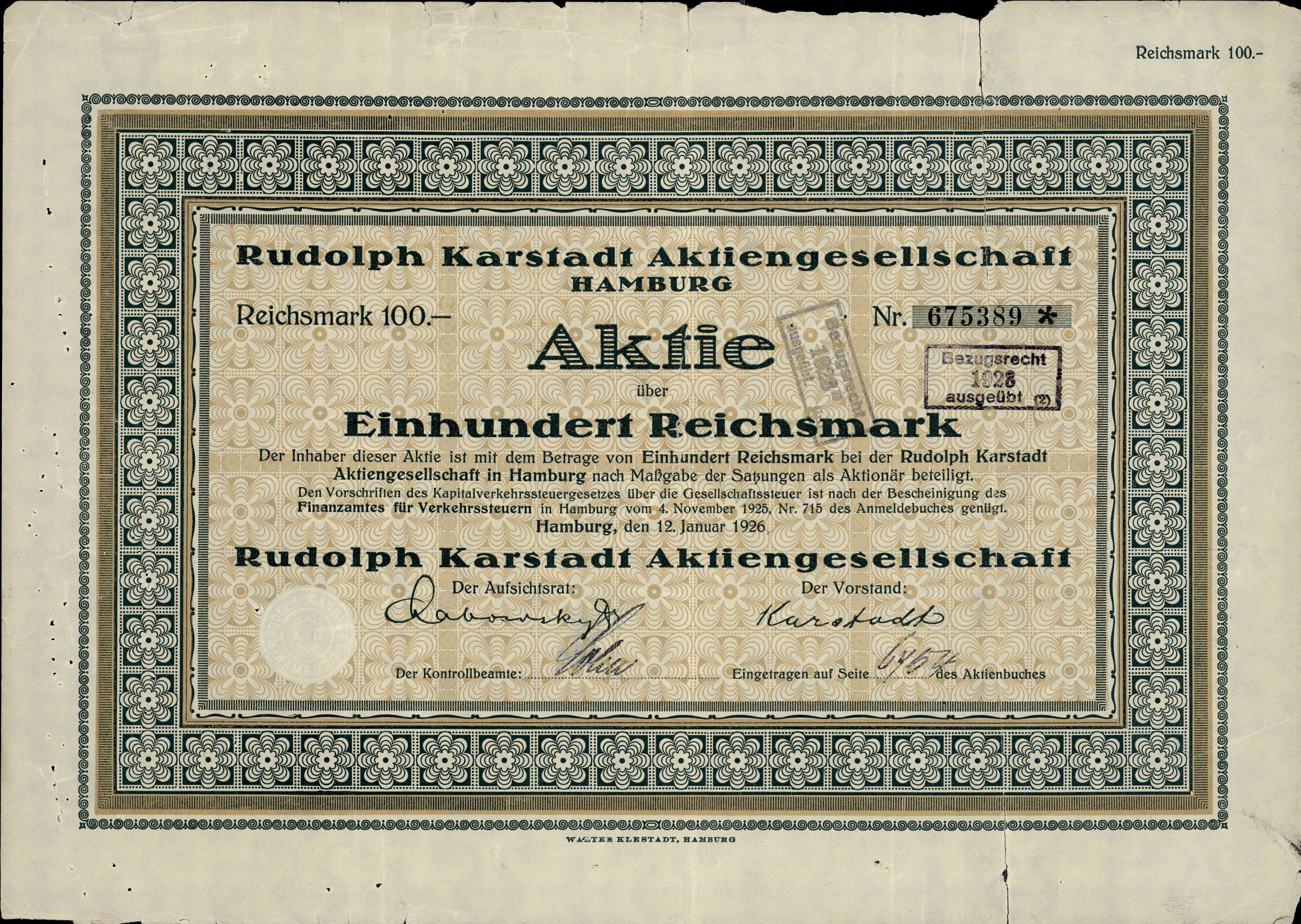
Share of the Rudolf Karstadt AG, issued 12 January 1926

On 14 May 1881 Rudolph Karstadt opened his first store in Wismar under the name "Tuch-, Manufactur- und Confectionsgeschäft Karstadt". Karstadt's strategy of offering fixed low prices in place of the traditional practice of haggling was successful from the start. The second Karstadt store opened in Lübeck in 1884, where the first customers included Thomas Mann and his brother Heinrich. Further branches opened in Neumünster (1888), Braunschweig (1890), Kiel (1893), Mölln (1895), Eutin (1896) and Preetz (1897). As a result of the poplar practice of no-haggling low prices, Karlstadt had soon opened branches in 24 towns across northern Germany.

In 1900, Rudolph Karstadt took over 13 stores from his highly indebted brother Ernst Karstadt in Anklam, Dömitz, Friedland, Greifswald, Güstrow, Hamburg (Röhrendamm), Ludwigslust, Neubrandenburg, Schwerin, Stavenhagen, Wandsbek (Lübecker Straße) and Waren (Müritz). Further branches opened in Bremen (1902), Hamburg-Eimsbüttel (1903), Altona (1903), Hanover (1906) and Wilhelmshaven (1908). An early highpoint was the opening in 1912 of the branch in Hamburg's Mönckebergstraße which, with a sales area of around 10,000 square metres (110,000 sq ft), was the first Karlstadt department store in a major German city. Karstadt also moved increasingly into the in-house production of clothing, opening a large material store in Berlin in 1911 and a clothing factory in the following year. In addition to this, a factory for the production of men's clothing was opened in Stettin in 1919.

In 1920 Karstadt took over the company Althoff from Theodor Althoff of Dülmen and transformed the entire group into a limited company. This meant that the Karstadt Group was now also represented by the Althoff stores in Dülmen (opened 1885), Rheine (1889), Borghorst (1889), Bottrop (1893), Bocholt (1893), Recklinghausen (1893), Essen (1894), Münster (1896), Duisburg (1899), Gladbeck (1901), Lippstadt (1901), Coesfeld (1902), Remscheid (1901), Dortmund (1904) and Leipzig (1914). It was only much later however (1963) that the Althoff stores were given the Karstadt name. The branch network had now expanded to 44 and this number grew further to 89 by 1931. After the First World War, Karstadt expanded rapidly and in July 1926 it established the EPA-Einheitspreis-Aktiengesellschaft with which it created a network of low price department stores. By 1932 there were 52 EPA stores. In addition to this, Karstadt acquired further production facilities in order to reduce further its dependency upon suppliers. These facilities included weaving mills, furnishers, printers and abattoirs.

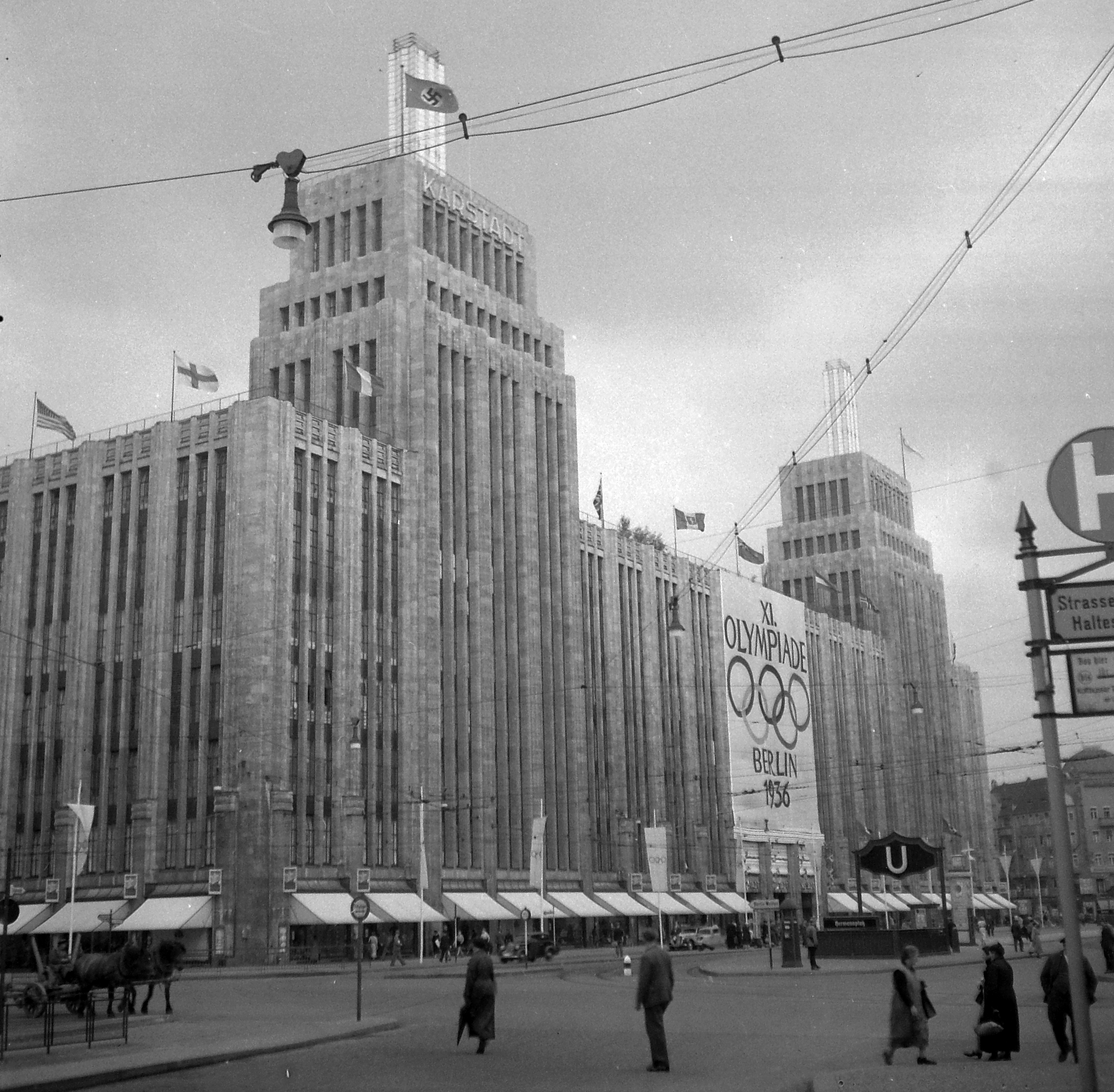
Karstadt department store on Hermannplatz, 1936

In 1929 one of the then-largest department stores in the world was opened on Hermannplatz in Berlin-Kreuzberg. The nine-storey building with around 72,000 square metres (780,000 sq ft) of usable space (at that time KaDeWe had less than 30,000 square metres (320,000 sq ft) initially offered work to 4,000 employees. The monumental building also had two 56-metre-high (184 ft) towers, a 4,000 square metres (43,000 sq ft) roof terrace and several truck lifts as well as its own entrance from the underground railway. It soon became clear, however, that the building was over-built and, in 1932, a number of floors were empty due to the economic crisis. In 1945 the building was blown up by members of the SS.

In 1932 Rudolph Karstadt stepped down from the management of the company following the dramatic decline in sales which accompanied the global economic crisis. A restructuring plan included a reduction in the share capital and the closure of numerous branches and production facilities; Epa AG was sold. In the 1930s the company suffered under the ideological reservations about department stores held by National Socialism. Such stores were generally perceived as a "Jewish invention" and were subject to widespread repression. Karstadt AG had to dismiss 830 Jewish employees, including four board members and 47 branch managers.

=== After the Second World War ===
After the Second World War, the stores to the east of the Oder and the Neiße, in Königsberg (East Prussia), Cranz (East Prussia), Neustettin (Pomerania), Stettin (Pomerania) and Guben (East Brandenburg) were expropriated – as were those in the Soviet Occupation Zone (including Schwerin, Leipzig, Potsdam, Halle and Görlitz). More than 30 of the remaining 45 stores in the West – including the then "flagships" in Berlin-Kreuzberg (Hermannplatz) and Hamburg (Mönckebergstraße) – had been destroyed or severely damaged.

The "economic miracle" of the post-war years enabled the company to recover and in the early 1950s it began to expand. A number of takeovers followed, including that of the Grimme department stores in Schleswig-Holstein in 1970.

In 1977 Karstadt acquired a majority share in Neckermann Versand AG and, with an annual turnover of 10.62 billion DM, became the Federal Republic's largest retailer. In the same year, it was decided to close the low-price chain Kepa. In 1984 Neckermann was taken over completely and integrated into the structure of the group.

Following German reunification, former Centrum department stores were taken over in Brandenburg an der Havel, Dresden, Halle, Magdeburg, Wismar and Görlitz. In 1994 Karstadt took over the Hertie department stores (which also included KaDeWe). These Hertie department stores initially continued to operate in parallel but they were then progressively transformed into Karstadt stores or closed. The takeover of Hertie also left Karstadt as the owner of a number of properties which the National Socialists had expropriated from the Jewish department store founder Wertheim. In 2005 the Berlin Administrative Court ordered KarstadtQuelle AG to compensate the heirs.

In 1999 Karstadt AG and the mail-order company Quelle merged to form KarstadtQuelle AG.

=== Karstadt department stores after the merger with Quelle ===
Following the merger with Quelle, the department stores of the former Karstadt AG were operated by Karstadt Warenhaus GmbH (known until 2006 as Karstadt Warenhaus AG), a fully owned subsidiary of KarstadtQuelle and Arcandor AG.

In October 2004 it emerged that Karstadt Warenhaus AG and the entire KarstadtQuelle group were in a dramatic financial situation. Karstadt was facing both the difficulties being faced by the entire retail sector and its own home-made problems. The company was continuing to ignore market trends by offering a wide assortment of goods while critics complained that the interiors were outdated and the goods on offer not customer-orientated.

Since 1 January 2005, the food departments in currently 67 (and initially 72) of the 90 Karstadt branches have been run by a Cologne-based joint venture known as Karstadt Feinkost GmbH & Co. KG, of which Karstadt owns 74.9% and the Rewe Group 25.1% and of which each company appoints one managing director. Karstadt contributed goods and properties worth around 50 million euros to the company and Rewe the same amount of new capital. Initially, Karstadt Feinkost had around 3,700 employees, most of whom had come from KarstadtQuelle, and generated an annual turnover of around 500 million euros. Until 2007 the joint venture reported annual pre-tax losses in the tens of millions. Ever since the founding of Karstadt Feinkost the departments have been gradually refurbished and repositioned with a modified product range under the new brand Perfetto.

The ongoing crisis situation led in August 2005 to the sale of 74 Karstadt branches with sales areas below 8,000 square metres (86,000 sq ft) (Karstadt Kompakt – which was later known as Hertie GmbH and then closed following insolvency), 51 SinnLeffers clothing stores and the specialist retail chain Runners Point.

The Karstadt department store properties still owned by KarstadtQuelle were sold in 2006 to the Highstreet consortium of which the group itself owned 49% and Whitehall Funds 51%. In 2008 KarstadtQuelle AG sold its 49% share to a consortium including the Borletti Group, the Generali Group, Pirelli RE and RREEF Alternative Investments.

In 2006, in order to mark its 125th anniversary, Karstadt published a celebratory book entitled Schaufenster Karstadt – Einblicke in 125 Jahre, which presented the history of the company.

Karstadt's book departments have been operated since April 2008 as "shops-in-shops" by DBH Warenhaus (Verlagsgruppe Weltbild/Hugendubel). In Karstadt's premium stores (such as KaDeWe and Karstadt's Hermannplatz store in Berlin) these book departments operate under the "Hugendubel" name and in all others as Weltbild. Further companies who are Karstadt tenants and operate independently while renting Karstadt's checkout/payment system include WMF, Rosenthal Porcelain and the drugstore brand Müller. In October 2007 the Handelsblatt reported that Karstadt was considering taking over the Kaufhof department stores from Metro AG, a deal which would have made the company Europe's second-largest department store group after Spain's El Corte Inglés. In 2008 Gravis announced the abandonment of its unprofitable cooperation with Karstadt in two pilot stores in Düsseldorf and Lübeck which had originally been envisaged for all 90 stores. In the same year Karstadt started cooperating with the fashion designers Kaviar & Gauche and Kostas Murkudis.

In May 2009 it was announced that the Metro Group's Kaufhof AG wanted to take over 60 of Karstadt's 90 department stores. In addition to this, liquidity problems meant that the Karstadt parent company Arcandor was no longer able to make rental payments to the Highstreet consortium, the owners of the department store buildings.

=== Insolvency proceedings and the sale to Berggruen ===
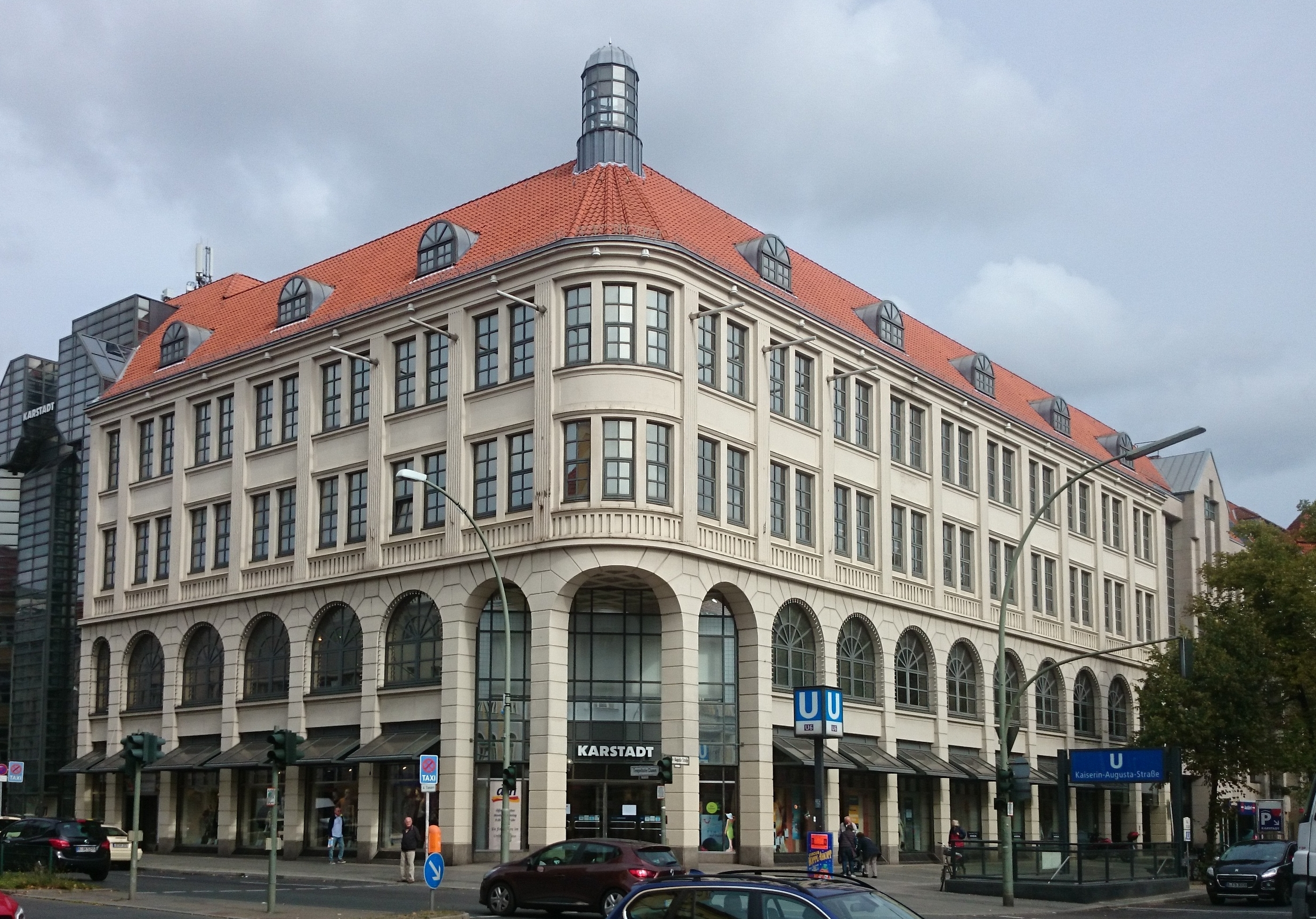
Karstadt department store in Berlin

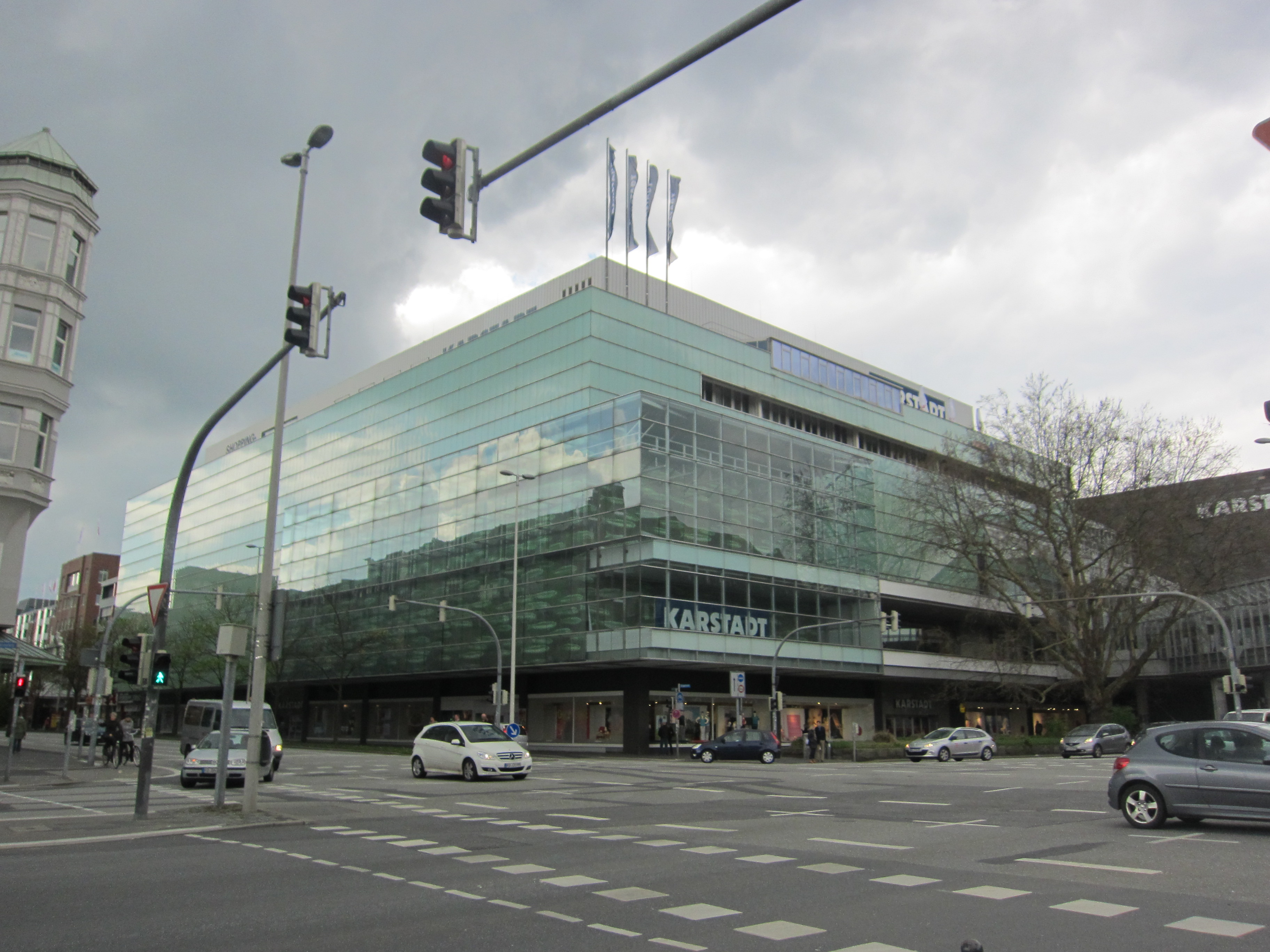
Karstadt department store in Kiel

Arcandor filed for bankruptcy on 9 June 2009. On 12 April 2010 the board of creditors agreed to the insolvency plan proposed by the insolvency administrator Klaus Hubertus Görg which envisaged a sale of the Karstadt department stores as a single entity to an investor and the waiver by the creditors of a large part of their demands. Some municipalities initially refused to agree to the required waiver of business tax payments. Four parties expressed interest in purchasing the Karstadt stores: the German-Swedish investor group Triton, Whitehall together with the Borletti Group and the German financial investor Nicolas Berggruen. Metro AG also expressed interest, but only in the acquisition of certain lucrative and strategically interesting Karstadt stores, which it intended to combine with its own Kaufhof stores into the "Deutsche Warenhaus AG".

On 7 June 2010 nine out of eleven votes were cast by Karstadt's board of creditors in favour of the Berggruen Holding – although the vote was subject to the closing conditions that the Highstreet consortium waived its demand for rental payments. Berggruen signed the purchase contract – primarily conditional upon an agreement with the principal landlord Highstreet – on 8 June 2010. €70 million was named as the purchase and investment price with a further €240 million to be invested in the following three years, for which Berggruen required no external capital. On 30 June 2010 the Federal Cartel Office approved the takeover of the department store chain. After tough negotiations, agreement with the Highstreet consortium regarding rental payments was reached in early September 2010.

Berggruen announced the legal division of Karstadt into a parent company and three subsidiary companies in the sectors of sports, premium and other stores. Smaller business divisions were seen as easier to manage and could react more quickly. In addition to this, each division would find it easier to find strategic partners and cooperative ventures. Following an adjustment of the labour agreement covering the restructuring process, Berggruen's Plan was approved by the trade union Verdi.

The logistics division of the company, KarstadtQuelle Beschaffungslogistik, continues to operate under the name Corporate Service (Germany) GmbH (CSG). The company offers international purchasing and, in particular, supply-chain solutions. The managing directors of CSG are Marc Baeuerle and Stefan Graetz and the headquarters are in Düsseldorf.

Between 1 October 2011 and 30 September 2012 the group generated losses of €249.6 million, €121 million of which resulted from restructuring measures and, in particular, severance payments to 2,000 employees. In the first seven months of the subsequent trading year sales fell by 7.9%. All general, sports and premium stores were below projections.

In May 2013 the company announced a "wage freeze" and, hence, a temporary suspension of the labour agreement until 2015.

In September 2013 it was made known that Berggruen was selling 75.1% of both the premium and the sports stores to the Austrian Signa Holding of the investor René Benko. The revenue of 300 million euros was to be used to modernise the Karstadt stores. 150 million euros were available for the general Karstadt stores, of which 15 million should be invested within five years and the further 135 million euros as required. 100 million euros of this revenue from the sale were earmarked for the premium stores and 50 million euros for the sports stores. The 300 million was only to be paid in full within 18 months but half should be paid before the end of the year.

In February 2014 Eva-Lotta Sjöstedt became the new managing director and successor to Andrew Jennings, who had been with Karstadt since the beginning of 2011. On 7 July 2014 the company announced the immediate resignation of Sjöstedt. In justifying her move she explained that "detailed checks, the experiences of the past few months and a closer knowledge of the economic situation have led me to conclude that the pre-conditions for the path chosen by me no longer exist".

=== Sale to Signa Holding ===
On 15 August 2014 it was announced that the Vienna-based Signa Holding was taking over the troubled department store chain for one Euro. Signa Holding also acquired the minority shares which had been retained by Nicolas Berggruen in Karstadt Sports GmbH and the Karstadt Premium GmbH, which owns stores including KaDeWe in Berlin, Alsterhaus in Hamburg and Oberpollinger in Munich. Four years ago the Chairman René Benko successfully opened an Austrian chain of department stores which could serve as an example for Karstadt. On 19 August 2014 an ad-hoc statement from Karstadt Warenhaus GmbH announced that the company's former Labour Relations Director and Head of Personnel Kai-Uwe Weitz who, together with the Finance Director Miguel Müllenbach, had been provisionally managing Karstadt since the departure of Eva-Lotta Sjöstedt in July, was also immediately leaving the company "by mutual agreement".

== Company headquarters ==
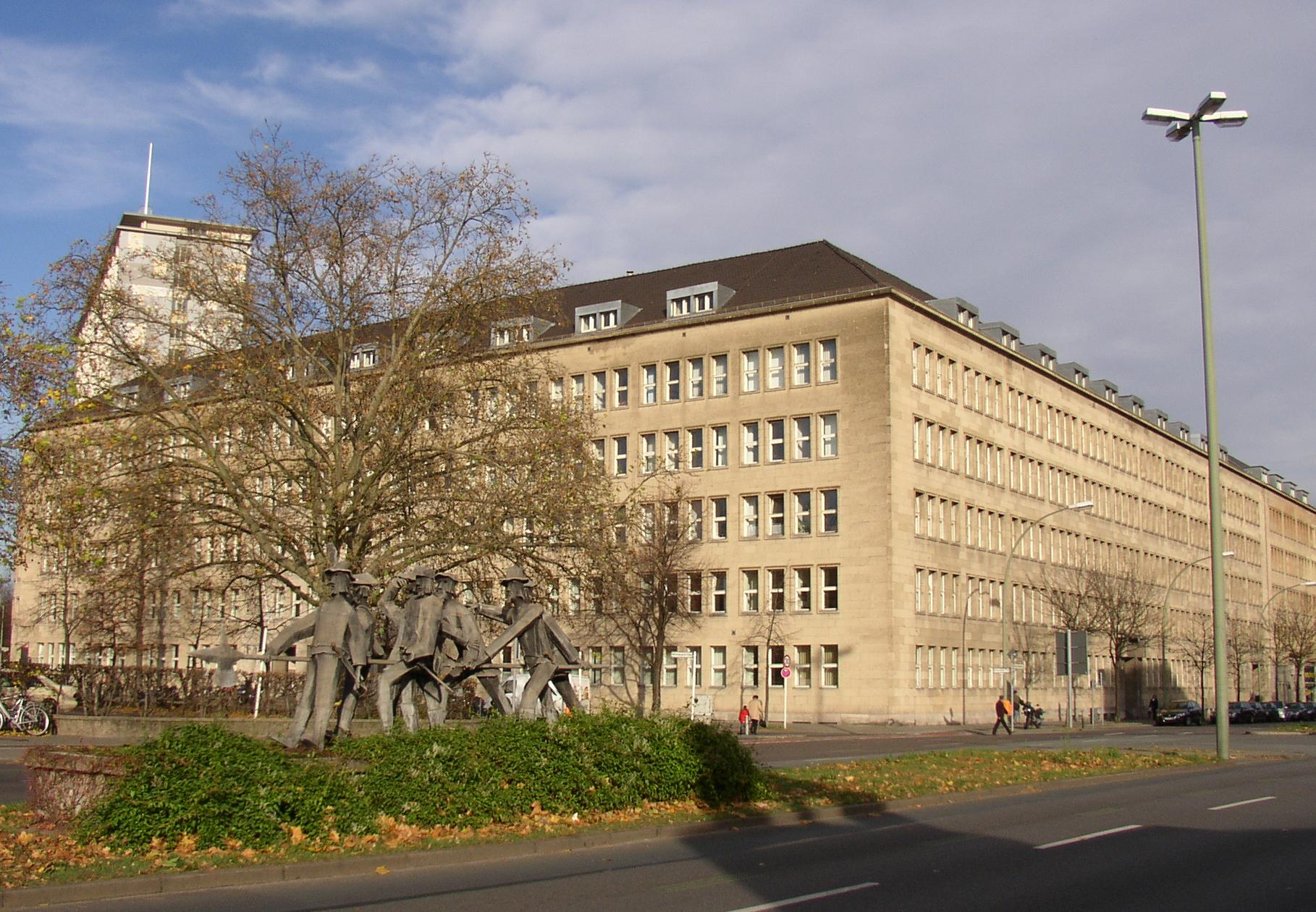
1936 Karstadt headquarters building, 2008

The company headquarters was initially located in Wismar. It moved to Kiel in 1893 and then in 1912 to Steinstraße in Hamburg. In 1932, it moved to Berlin, first in a new building on the then Königstraße, near Alexanderplatz. In 1936, the headquarters moved again, to a new "tailor-made" headquarters on Fehrbelliner Platz, designed by Philipp Schaefer. The structure was seized first by the SS in 1943 and then by the British occupation forces after World War II, when it was renamed Cumberland House. The building was handed over to the Senate of Berlin in 1951. Today, it houses the Landesverwaltungsamt Berlin (State Administration Office of Berlin). After the end of the war parts of the administration were transferred to Hamburg, Recklinghausen and Limbecker Platz in Essen. In 1969, after three-years of construction, the headquarters was transferred to Essen-Bredeney (alongside the A 52). That location continues to serve as the headquarters of the successor company, Galeria Karstadt Kaufhof.

== Competitors ==
Karstadt's most significant competitor was Kaufhof, which it merged with in 2019. Earlier competitors were Hertie (which later merged with Karstadt) and Horten (which later merged with Kaufhof). Bricks-and-mortar competitors included C&A, Peek & Cloppenburg and Saturn. From the 1960s and 70s on, competition increased on "green-field" sites – sites on the edge of cities or in the suburbs. Self-service department stores like Real, Famila, Plaza and other specialty stores (Adler, Vögele, Vobis, Media Markt) experienced particularly strong growth. Attempts by Karstadt in the 1970s to establish an in-house self-service division were unsuccessful.

== Branches ==
At the beginning of 2009 there were 90 Karstadt stores in Germany and the company also owned two branches of Schaulandt. The most important stores included KaDeWe (around 60,000 m^{2}) in Berlin, Oberpollinger (around 33,000 m^{2}) in Munich and Alsterhaus (around 24,000 m^{2}) in Hamburg. The original store in Wismar is, with around 3,100 square metres, the smallest.

The 180 Fox markets, in which remaindered goods from Karstadt and Quelle were sold, were closed at the end of 2007. These goods were then sold in ""Karstadt-Schnäppchencenters"".

The closure of Karstadt's branches in Dortmund (Kampstraße), Munich (am Dom) and in Hamburg's Elbe Shopping Centre was announced on 10 November 2009. A Schaulandt store in Braunschweig, a branch of WOM in Stuttgart and the Karstadt multimedia store in Berlin-Biesdorf also closed.

On 1 October 2011 KaDeWe Berlin, Alsterhaus Hamburg and Oberpollinger Munich and all branches of Karstadt Sports were absorbed into Karstadt Premium GmbH and Karstadt Sports GmbH respectively. This meant that the three premium stores and the sports shops were no longer part of Karstadt Warenhaus GmbH.

As part of Karstadt Warenhaus GmbH's "Karstadt 2015" restructuring programme it was decided to reorient the company's online sales approach. In November 2012 Karstadt announced the relaunch of its online stores in cooperation with Demandware and SinnerSchrader.

The branch with the highest sales was the one located next to Munich main station which offered 300,000 products and covered 40,000 square metres. This branch closed 30 June 2023.

As of 30 July 2016 the company had 114 stores in Germany.

== Films ==
- Mitarbeiter feiern Karstadt-Rettung. Television report, Germany, 2010, 1:34 min, production: n-TV, broadcast: 3 September 2010
- Karstadt – Der große Schlussverkauf. Wie das Warenhaus in die Pleite geriet. Documentary film, Germany, 2010, 45 min., written and directed by Ingolf Gritschneder and Georg Wellmann, production: WDR, first broadcast: 24 February 2010, 23:30 in Das Erste

The documentary received the German Economic Film Prize 2010. It demonstrates "that the relationships between private investors and managers were closer and more extensive than known - and then showed the effect that this had on the end of the company."

- Die Karstadt-Story. Documentary film, Germany, 2004, 45 min., written and directed by Daniel Hechler, Stefan Tiyavorabun, production: SWR, Report Mainz, first broadcast: 10 November 2004 in Das Erste.

== See also ==
- Aryanization
- Wertheim (department store)
