= Ernst Tanner =

Swiss manager and entrepreneur (born 1946)

- Born: 24 July 1946 (age 80)
- Occupation: Chairman of the Board of Lindt & Sprüngli

Ernst Tanner (born 24 July 1946) is a Swiss manager and entrepreneur. He is Chairman of the Board of the chocolate manufacturer Lindt & Sprüngli.

== Life ==
After earning his undergraduate degree in business administration, Tanner continued his education at business schools in London and Harvard. He worked for over 20 years in a leading management position in the Johnson & Johnson Group in Europe and the USA. In 1993 he joined Lindt & Sprüngli as a CEO and the next year he also assumed as its Chairman of the Board of Directors, for many years holding both mandates as a double mandate. Since his involvement in the Company, the revenue of the chocolate manufacturer has surged considerably. He has been Vice President of the Board of Directors since 2011, where he was a member since 2002 and since 2014, Chairman of the Compensation Committee of the Swatch Group. He is also a member of the advisory board of the German Krombacher Brauerei In 2015 he bought 10% of the Signa Holding and took a seat in the advisory board of the company. In October 2021, he capitalized on his involvement in Signa and sold 4% of the shares back to the owner of the Signa Holding, René Benko.

== Private life ==
He is married and has a son.
