= SinnerSchrader =

SinnerSchrader AG

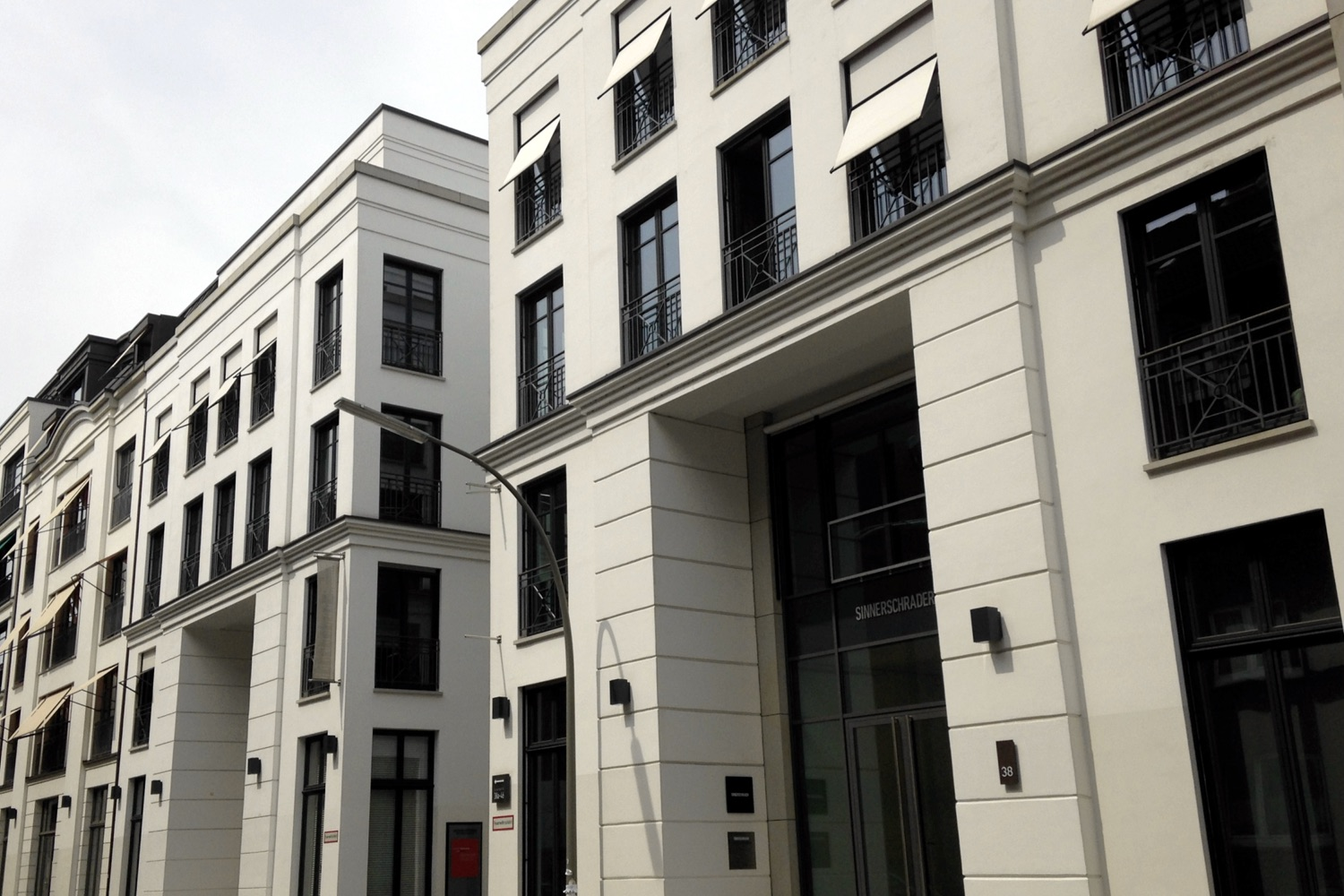
- Former headquarters in Ottensen
- Type: Aktiengesellschaft (AG)
- Traded as: FWB: SZZ
- ISIN: DE0005141907
- Industry: Internet, E-Commerce
- Founded: 1996; 30 years ago in Hamburg, Germany
- Founder: Oliver Sinner; Matthias Schrader
- Defunct: 2022
- Fate: Acquired by Accenture
- Successor: Accenture Song
- Headquarters: Hamburg, Germany
- Revenue: €65 million (FY 2018/2019)
- Number of employees: 577 (FY 2018/2019)
- Parent: Accenture Digital Holdings

SinnerSchrader was a digital agency with headquarters in Hamburg, Germany. The company was founded in 1996 and was listed on the stock market from 1999. Since 2017, SinnerSchrader has been part of Accenture. The company was merged with a few other agencies under the umbrella of Accenture Song (previously Accenture Interactive) and was fully integrated in 2022.

== History ==
=== Establishment and early years ===
In 1996, Oliver Sinner and Matthias Schrader founded an online agency in Hamburg. Headquarters were established in the former Johannes Krause tanning machinery factory in the Ottensen district. Further offices were later opened in Berlin, Frankfurt, Munich, and Prague.

One of SinnerSchrader’s main areas of business was the establishment of online stores. The agency’s clients included SMEs as well as large international corporations.

=== Floatation and consolidation ===
In 1999, SinnerSchrader became a stock company. In November of that year, the company went public on the Frankfurt Stock Exchange, and raised around €28 million as a result. Part of this was redistributed to shareholders in 2004. From 2003 onwards, the shares of SinnerSchrader were traded in the Prime Standard of German Stock Exchange.

After the dot-com bubble burst, sales and profits plummeted, which meant that SinnerSchrader had to reduce working hours. Oliver Sinner left the company in 2002, and it continued to be managed by Matthias Schrader. The company turned a profit once again in the 2004/2005 financial year. Today, the survival of the company is considered exemplary for the transformation of the former new economy.

=== New growth areas ===
E-commerce remained an important growth area for SinnerSchrader. As well as this, the company strived to diversify its business, for example through the acquisition of smaller agencies. SinnerSchrader also founded an advertising agency.

In 2006, SinnerSchrader established the Next Conference to mark a company anniversary. It is focused on questions concerning the digital transformation and its social and economic consequences.

=== Takeover by Accenture ===
In 2017, the international consulting company Accenture announced its takeover of SinnerSchrader. In the first step, 60% of the share capital was secured, and the stake was gradually increased to over 90%. The remaining shareholders were offered a cash settlement for their exclusion. In 2019, SinnerSchrader announced it was no longer listed on the stock exchange.

Following the takeover, SinnerSchrader initially became part of Accenture Interactive. In Germany, Austria, and Switzerland, this business unit was managed by Matthias Schrader. Since 2022, all the agencies acquired by Accenture over the years have been operating together under the name Accenture Song. Matthias Schrader left the company in 2022.

== Corporate structure ==
SinnerSchrader traded as a stock corporation under German law (Aktiengesellschaft). At the 2022 general assembly, it was decided to merge the company with the Accenture Digital Holdings corporation, headquartered in Kronberg im Taunus. SinnerSchrader was subsequently removed from the German commercial register.

== Controversies ==
In 2005, SinnerSchrader was featured on the list of "biggest capital destroyers" on the German stock market. The company rejected this criticism, whereupon the Deutsche Schutzvereinigung für Wertpapierbesitz admitted mistakes and revised its assessment of the SinnerSchrader share price.
