= Galeria Kaufhof =

German department store chain

Galeria Kaufhof GmbH

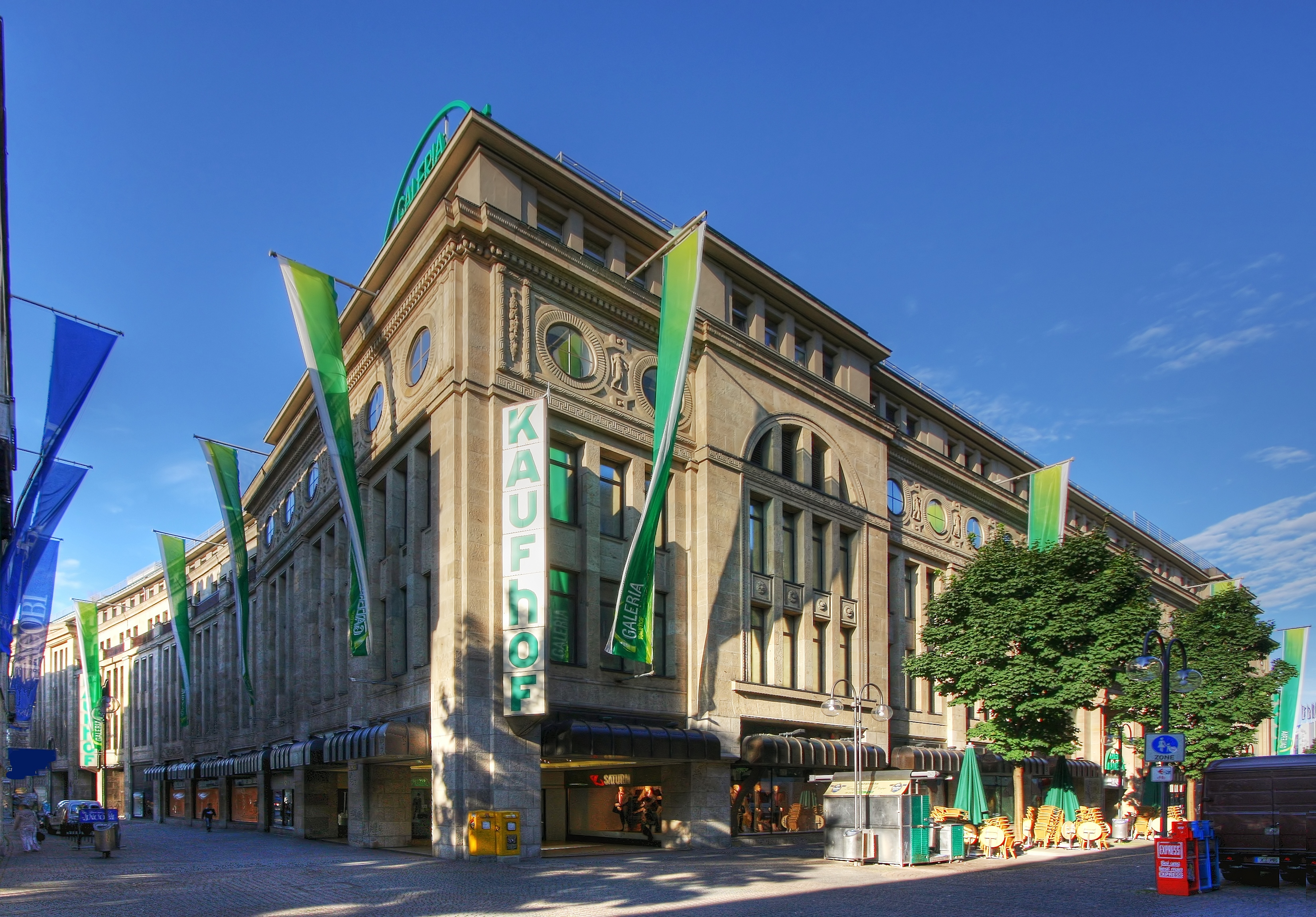
- Galeria Kaufhof Cologne, Hohe Straße
- Company type: Private
- Industry: Retail
- Genre: Department store
- Predecessor: Kaufhof Warenhaus AG
- Founded: 1879; 147 years ago
- Founder: Leonhard Tietz
- Fate: Merged with Karstadt
- Successor: Galeria Karstadt Kaufhof
- Headquarters: Cologne, Germany
- Areas served: Germany; Belgium
- Key people: Dr. Wolfgang Link (chairman of the board)
- Revenue: 3,120,000,000 euro (2014)
- Number of employees: 21 500 (2014)
- Parent: Signa Holding
- Website: https://galeria-kaufhof.de

Galeria Kaufhof GmbH was a German department store chain, headquartered in Cologne. It was a member of the International Association of Department Stores from 1930 to 2010, with various CEOs acting as presidents of the Association over time.

Until 30 September 2015, the company was a subsidiary of Metro AG, when the company announced that it had been acquired by Hudson's Bay Company. In September 2018 they announced plans to merge with their largest competitor Karstadt. In June 2019 all the shares of Galeria Kaufhof were bought by the Austrian company Signa Holding, who been the partner in the former merger.

On 25 March 2019, Karstadt and Galeria Kaufhof launched their merged company, Galeria Karstadt Kaufhof, based in Essen, with a new logo and a new website galeria.de.

== Business portfolio ==
- Galeria Kaufhof - 97 branches
- DINEA Gastronomie GmbH - 58 restaurants
- Galeria Inno - 16 stores in Belgium
