= Kika (retailer) =

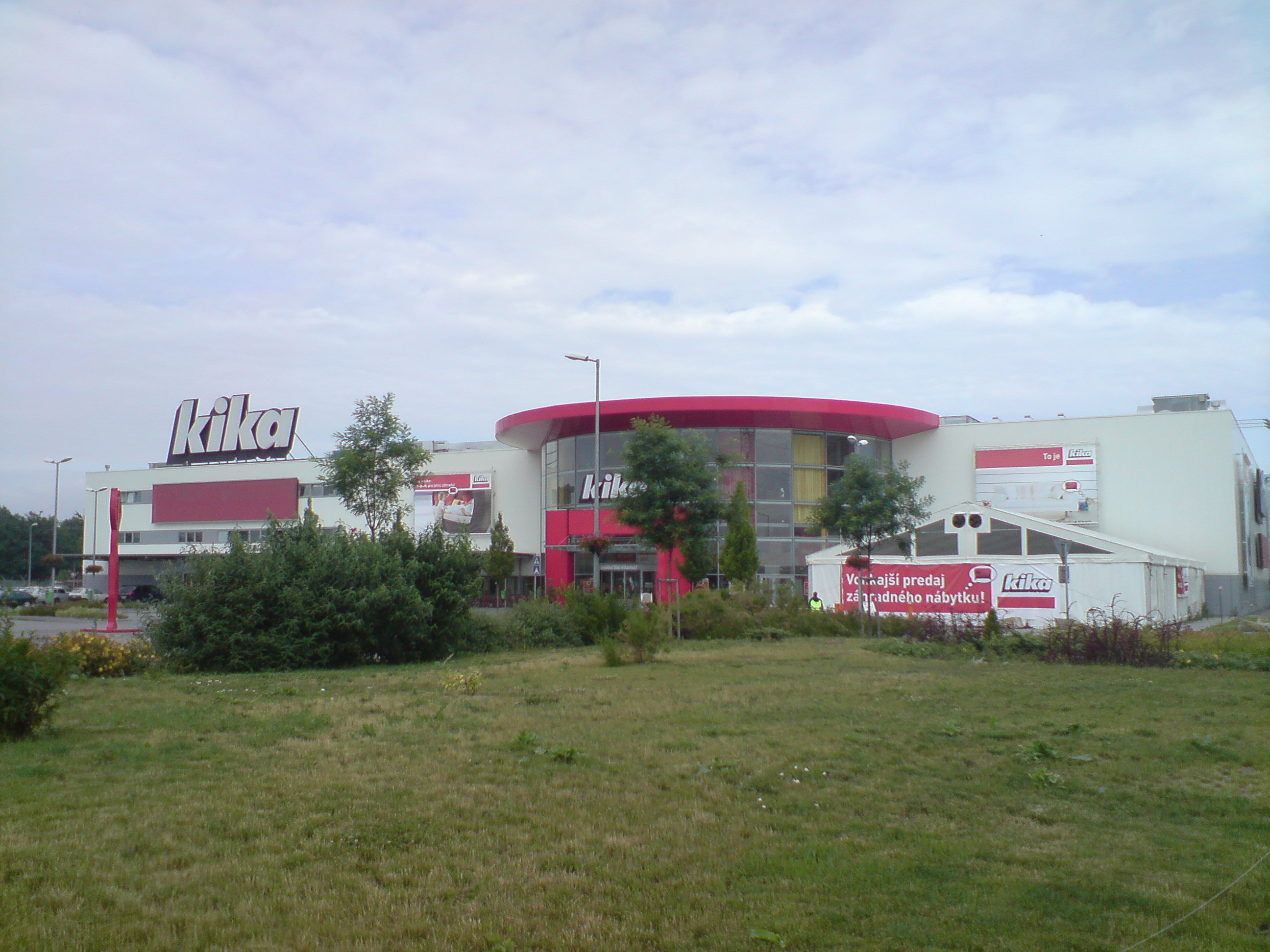
Kika

Kika was an international chain of furniture stores, headquartered in Austria. It had 70 stores, most of them were in Europe.

== History ==
In June 2013, Steinhoff International acquired Kika-Leiner, which operated 73 stores.

In June 2018, the Signa Holding, a real estate and retail investor, acquired from Steinhoff International the Kika-Leiner retail outlets, which operated 100 stores and managed 6,500 employees.

In 2024 Kika-Leiner declared bankruptcy.

== Kika locations in Austria ==
Kika locations in Austria 2019:

- in Burgenland: Eisenstadt, Unterwart
- in Carinthia: Klagenfurt
- in Lower Austria: Horn, Mistelbach, Stockerau, Sankt Pölten, Wiener Neustadt
- in Upper Austria: Ansfelden, was in Linz, Aurolzmünster / Ried im Innkreis
- in Salzburg: Eugendorf, Saalfelden, St Johann im Pongau
- in Styria: Feldbach, Graz, Leoben, Liezen
- in Tyrol: Lienz (Nussdorf/Debant), Imst, Innsbruck, Wörgl
- in Vorarlberg: Dornbirn
- in Vienna: Favoriten, Ottakring, Donaustadt
Kika locations 2019
