= Tietz =

Tietz is a surname. Notable people with the surname include:

- Anton Ferdinand Tietz (1742–1810), German composer
- Christiane Tietz (born 1967), German protestant theologian and leading church president in Hesse
- Gerold Tietz (1941–2009), German author
- Hermann Tietz (1837–1907), merchant and founder of one of the first German department stores
- Hermann Tietz (rabbi) (1834–????), German rabbi
- Leonhard Tietz (1849–1914), merchant and founder of one of the first German department stores
- Marion Tietz (born 1952), East German handball player and Olympian
- Oscar Tietz (1858–1923), German merchant and businessman
- Phillip Tietz (born 1997), German footballer
- Viktor Tietz (1859–1937), Czech–German chess player, chess life organizer and local politician

== Named after people with this surname ==
- Kulturkaufhaus Tietz
- Tietz syndrome

== Other uses ==
- an old name of the town Tütz in Hinterpommern; now Tuczno in West Pomeranian Voivodeship, in northwestern Poland
