= Margarete Tietz =

Social activist and educator

- Born: Margarete Caecilie Dzialoszynski; August 31, 1887; Berlin, German Empire
- Died: February 26, 1972 (aged 84); London, England
- Occupations: Social activist, educator and patron of the arts
- Known for: One of ten female delegates to the first Federation Day of the Prussian Regional Association of Jewish Communities (1925)
- Spouse: Alfred Leonhard Tietz (m. 1909)

Margarete Caecilie Tietz (née: Dzialoszynski; born August 31, 1887, in Berlin; died February 26, 1972, in London) was a social activist, educator and patron of the arts in Cologne. She then continued this work after emigrating to the Netherlands and the United States.

== Early life ==
Margarete Dzialoszynski was born in the German Empire in Berlin in 1887 as the daughter of Albert Ariel Dzialoszynski, a Jewish wholesaler from Kępno, and his wife Emma Sarah Meyermann, who came from Vilnius.

After completing secondary school, she studied social work in Berlin and taught children from poor backgrounds.

In 1909, she married the eldest son of the department store founder Leonhard Tietz, the Cologne merchant Alfred Leonhard Tietz. In 1912, she was elected to the board of the Association for Jewish Nurses. Their first son, Wolfgang, was born in 1913, followed by the birth, two years later of daughter Herta Gabriele. Margarete Tietz's husband then took over the management of the Leonhard Tietz AG department stores, following the death of her father-in-law, Leonhard Tietz.

== Social welfare activism ==
When Tietz's husband was drafted during the World War I, Margarete Tietz became involved in the Vaterländischer Frauenverein (Fatherland Women's Association) and attended the Hochschule für kommunale und soziale Verwaltung (College for Municipal and Social Administration). As in Berlin, she also taught children from underprivileged backgrounds in Cologne.

After war's end, the Tietz couple acquired the villa at Parkstraße 61 in Cologne-Marienburg, which had been built by Hervey Cotton Merrill in 1908. In December 1920, the couple's youngest son, Ulrich Albert, was born.

Tietz and her husband supported numerous social projects in Cologne. She served as chair of the Sisters' Association of the Jewish Asylum, to which she had belonged since 1911, and also as chair of the Association for Mothers' and Children's Rights and Cologne Association for Women's Studies. She and her mother-in-law, Flora Tietz, were members of the Cologne Women's Club.

She also founded the summer camp for working women and was a co-founder of the Cologne Family Service. She headed the Jewish Women's League in Cologne (Jüdischen Frauenbund), the Sisterhood of the Rhineland and Moriahloge, and the Jewish People's Kitchen, which she helped to found in 1919.

In 1925, Margarete Tietz was one of ten women named as delegates to the first Federation Day of the Prussian Regional Association of Jewish Communities (PLV). During the Great Depression in the early 1930s, she and family members organized canteens to feed 800 starving people per day.

For a time, Margarete Tietz was a member of the social committee of the Prussian State Association of Jewish Communities. In 1929, she was one of the co-founders of GEDOK in Cologne. She also subsequently supported numerous young female artists.

== Nazi persecution ==
When the Nazis came to power in 1933, members of the Tietz family were persecuted because of their Jewish heritage. Jewish stores and department stores were boycotted, loans were cancelled by the banks and the owners were put under massive pressure to hand over the management to "Aryan hands".

On March 31, 1933, one day before the first nationwide "Boycott Day", the board of Tietz AG resigned in unison. Over the next few weeks, Leonhard Tietz was forced to sell the company far below its value. The department stores of Leonhard Tietz AG were "Aryanized" and "taken over" by Westdeutsche Kaufhof AG. In the runup to the anti-Jewish boycotts, the Tietz family fled to Amsterdam with their children and mother-in-law Flora Tietz. The Tietz couple briefly returned to Cologne to settle business matters. Because of her Jewish origin, Tietz had to give up all association offices in the spring of 1933. Margerete Tietz and her husband left Cologne on July 9, 1933, and headed for the Saar region, and then in 1934, to Amsterdam. She became involved in the Jewish Advisory Board as well as in the Joodsche Vrouwencomité and founded a Club of Refugees in Amsterdam. She supported and taught German emigrants before their emigration to England and the United States.

The Tietz family fled to Palestine in 1940 on the last ship to leave Amsterdam. A year later, on August 4, 1941, Alfred Tietz died at the age of 58. Margarete Tietz opened a guesthouse in Jerusalem-Talpiot, using the proceeds to finance her daughter Herta's medical studies.

== Postwar ==
In 1948, after World War II, Margarete Tietz emigrated from Palestine to the United States.

Hertha Kraus, a social scientist and Quaker who had also fled Cologne, asked Margarete Tietz to help move an old people's home for refugees from Europe from New York to Newark. As she had done in Germany and the Netherlands, Margarete Tietz assisted sick and elderly citizens, especially refugees and survivors of the Holocaust. She established a social foundation in her name and took over the management of various social institutions. At New York University she deepened her knowledge in the field of gerontology. She founded the Margaret Tietz Nursing & Rehabilitation Center, where – similar to the Riehler Heimstätten housing project conceived by Hertha Kraus in Cologne – residents of different denominations could live in a complex with a residential home, nursing homes and a care area for people with physical and mental disabilities.

== Death ==
Margarete Tietz died on February 26, 1972, at the age of 84, while on a visit to London.

== Honors and memorials ==
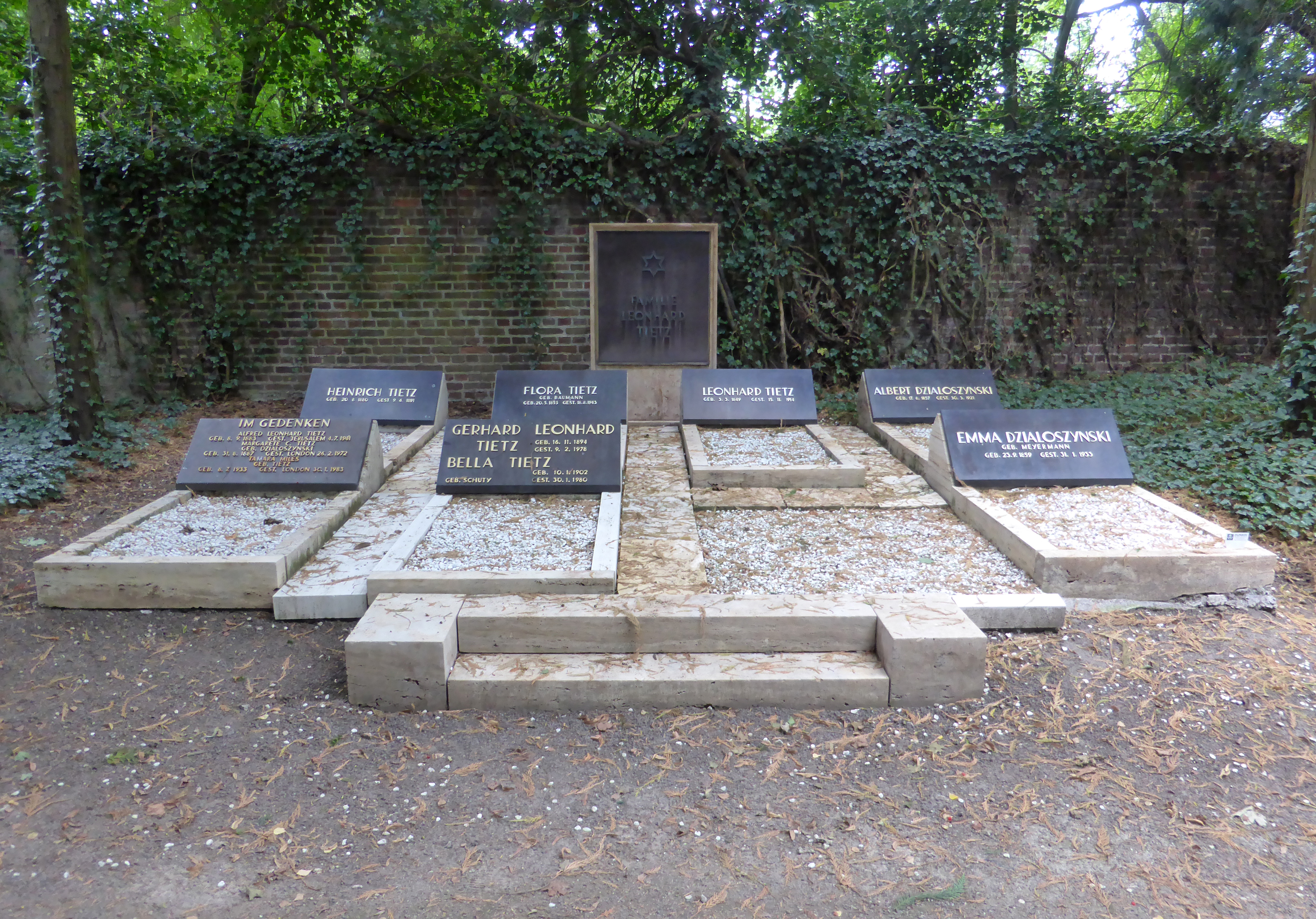
Memorial plaque for Margarete and Alfred L. Tietz (left front) at the Jewish Cemetery Cologne-Bocklemünd

Margarete Tietz was honored for her social actions on the occasion of the 30th anniversary of the founding of the American Federation of Jews from Central Europe. In the United States, she founded the Margaret Tietz Foundation, which supported social projects for Jewish emigrants. In the mid-1960s, she founded the Margaret Tietz Nursing & Rehabilitation Center in Jamaica (Queens), New York City.

At the Bocklemünd Jewish Cemetery in Cologne, a memorial plaque on the Tietz family grave commemorates the couple Margarete and Alfred L. Tietz.

On March 18, 2019, Stolpersteine were laid in front of the former home of the Tietz family, Parkstraße 61 in Cologne-Marienburg by artist Gunter Demnig, in memory of Margarete Tietz as well as her husband Alfred and their three children Wolfgang Leonhard (born 1913), Herta Gabriele (born 1915) and Ulrich Albert Leonhard (born 1920). The laying of the stumbling stones was initiated by the Rhineland Cologne Section of the German Alpine Club.

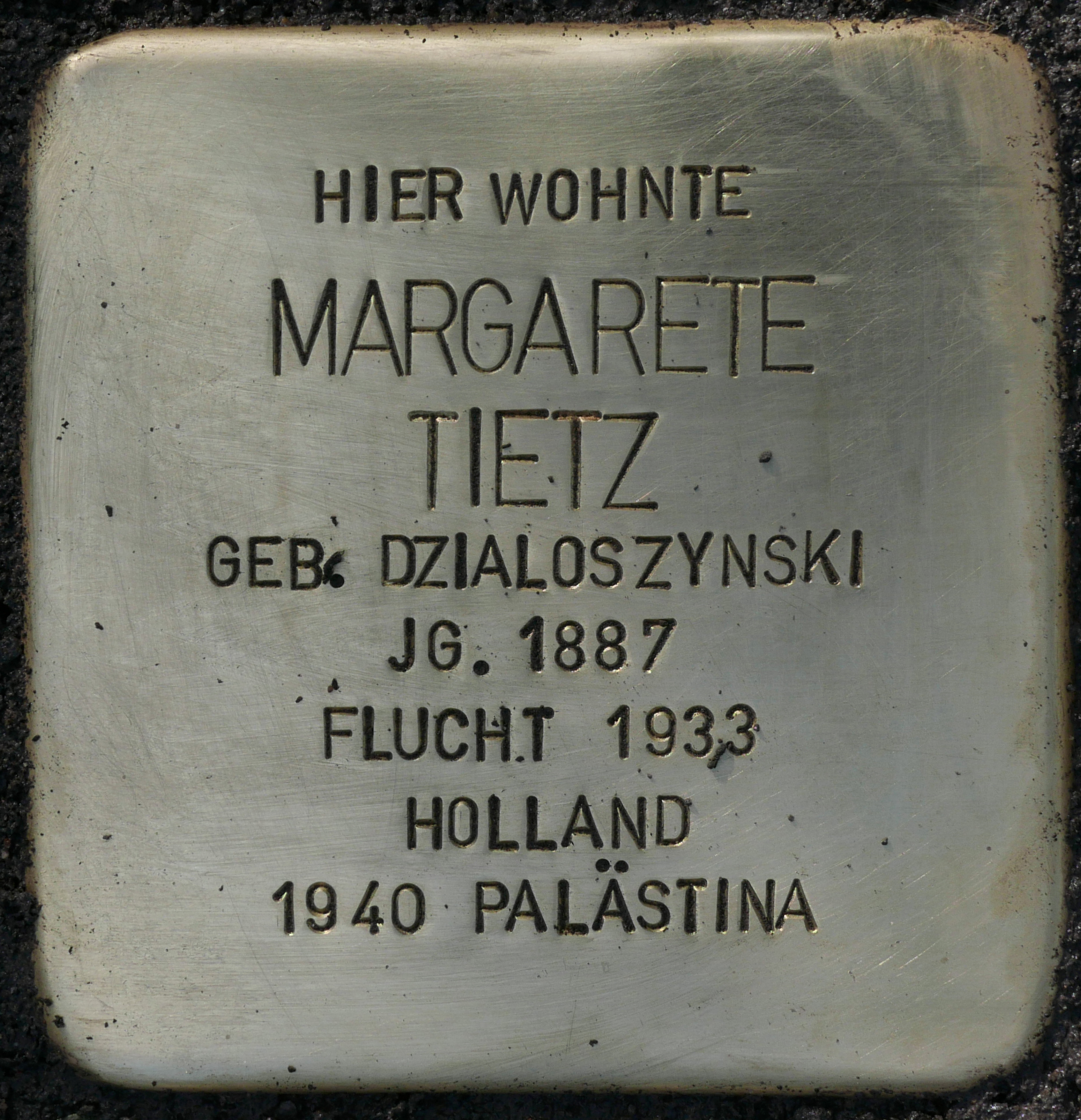
Stolperstein for Margarete Tietz

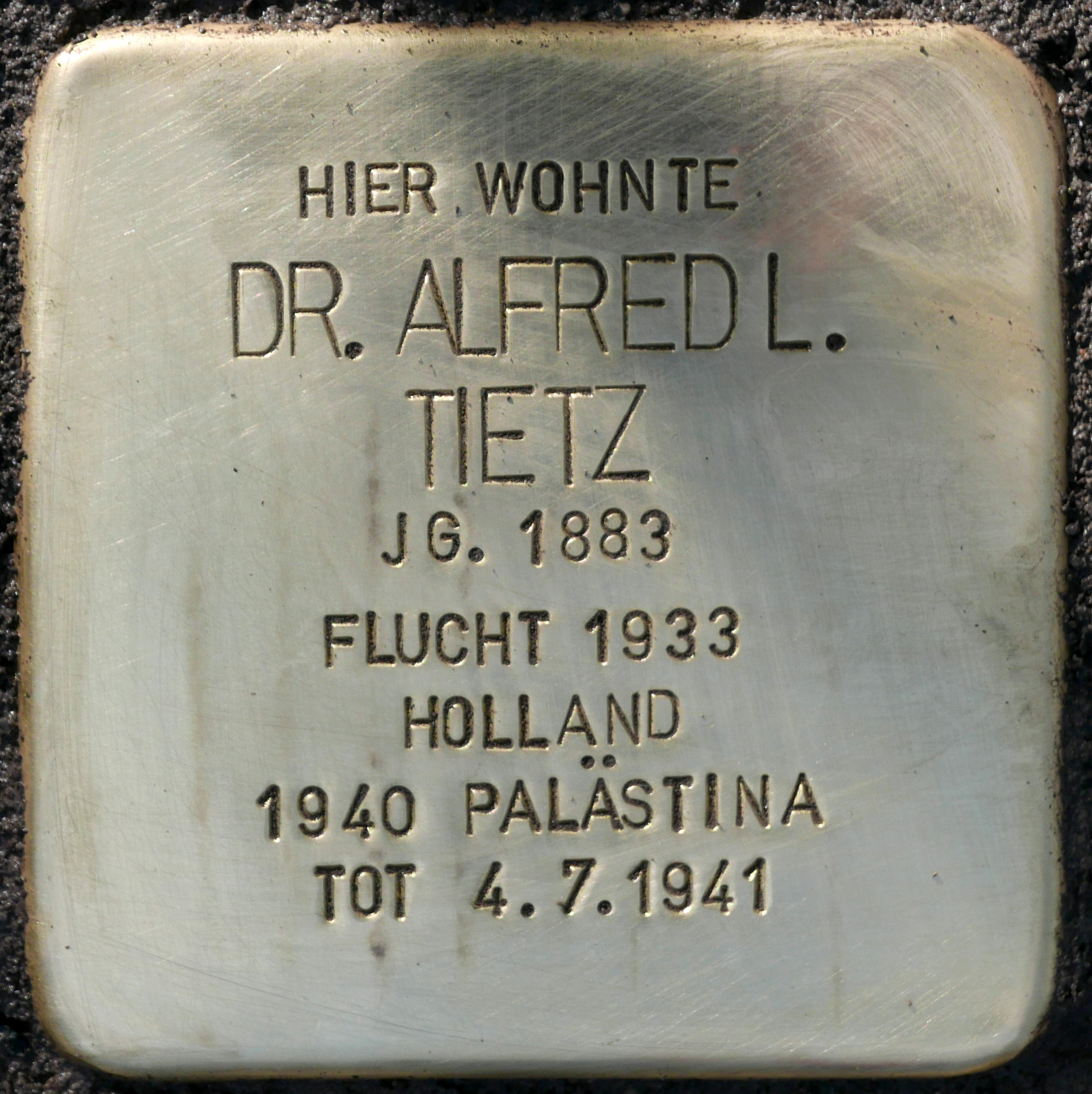
Stolperstein for Alfred Leonhard Tietz

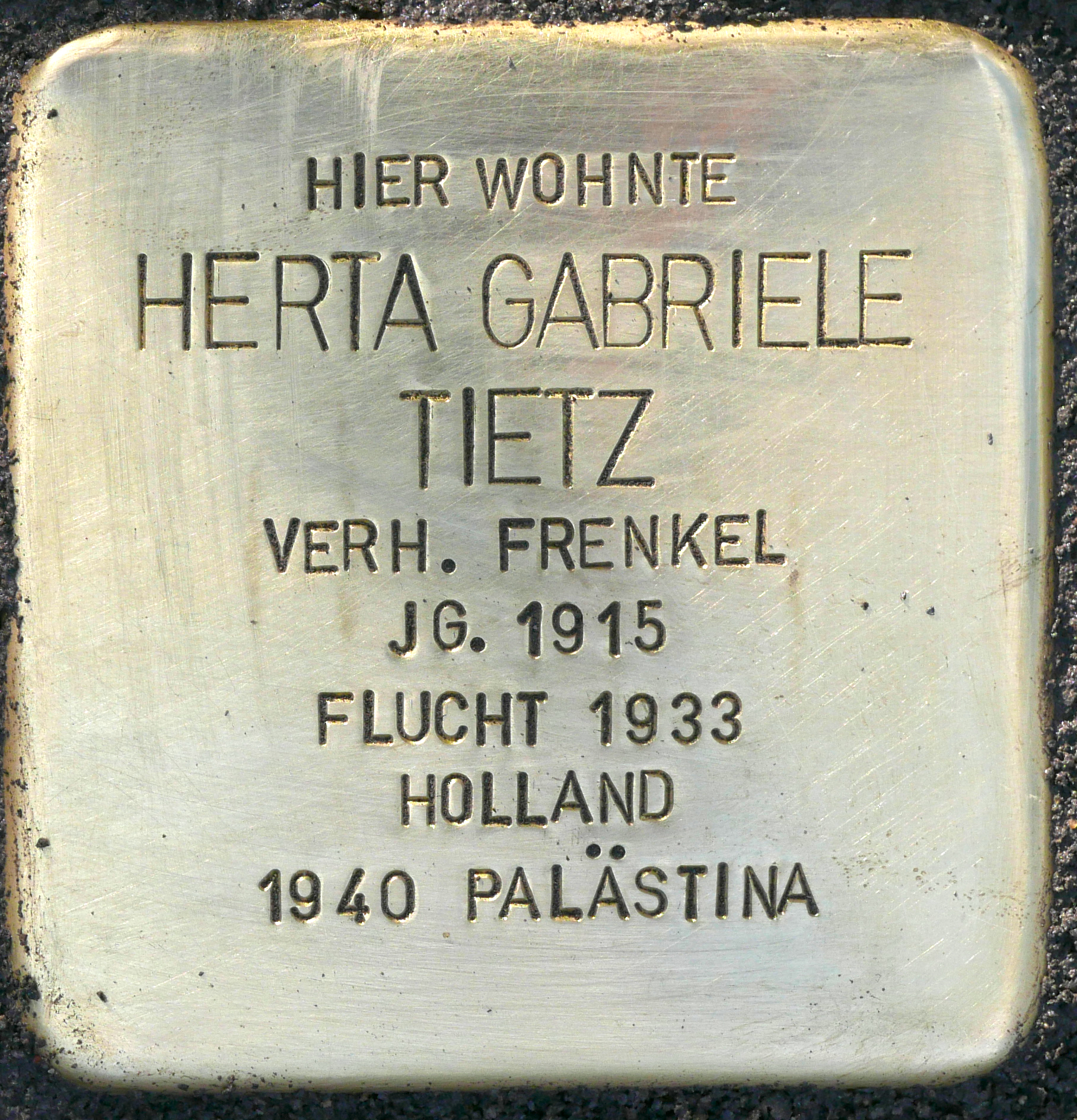
Stolperstein for Herta Gabriele Tietz

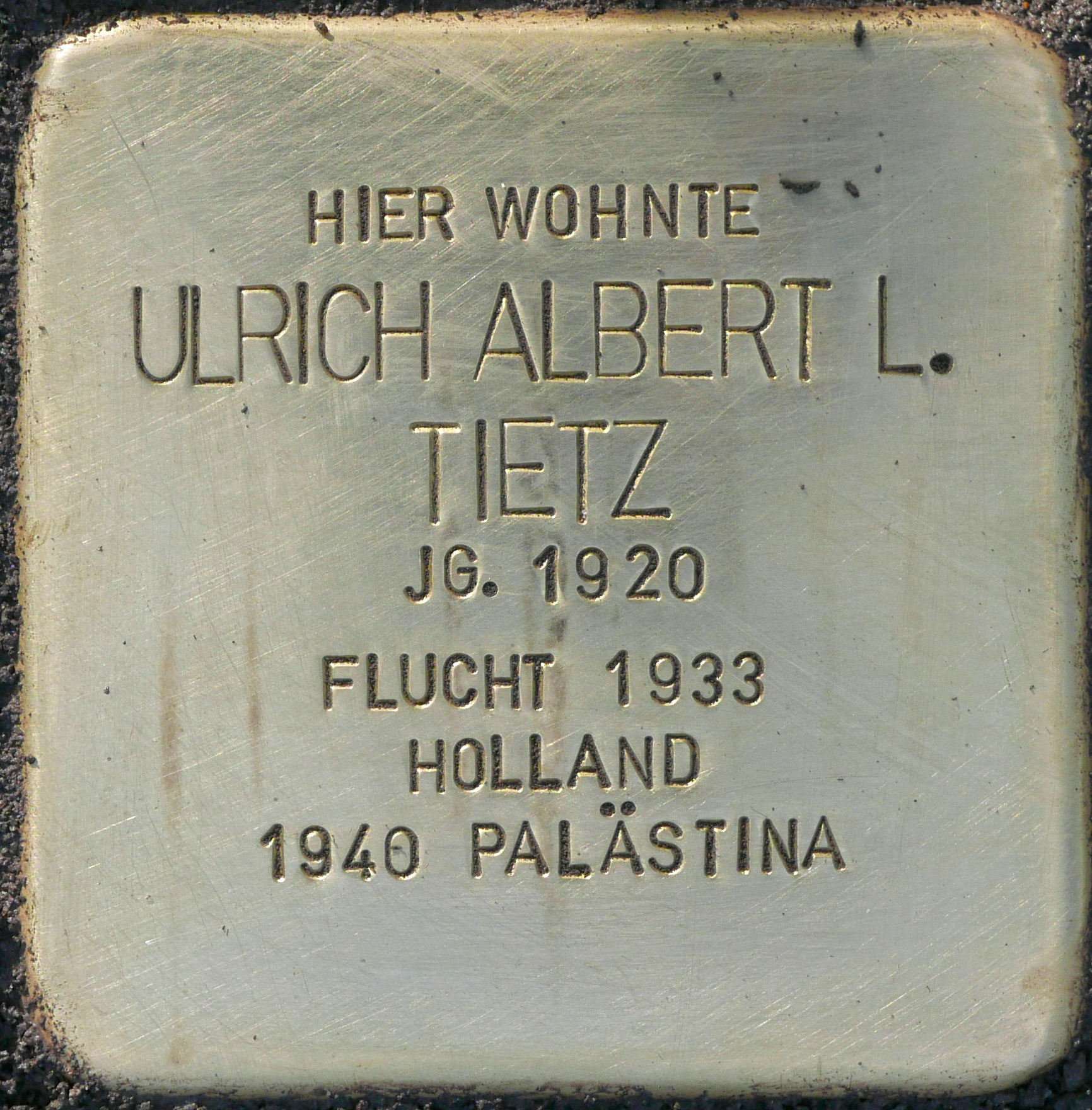
Stolperstein for Ulrich Albert L. Tietz

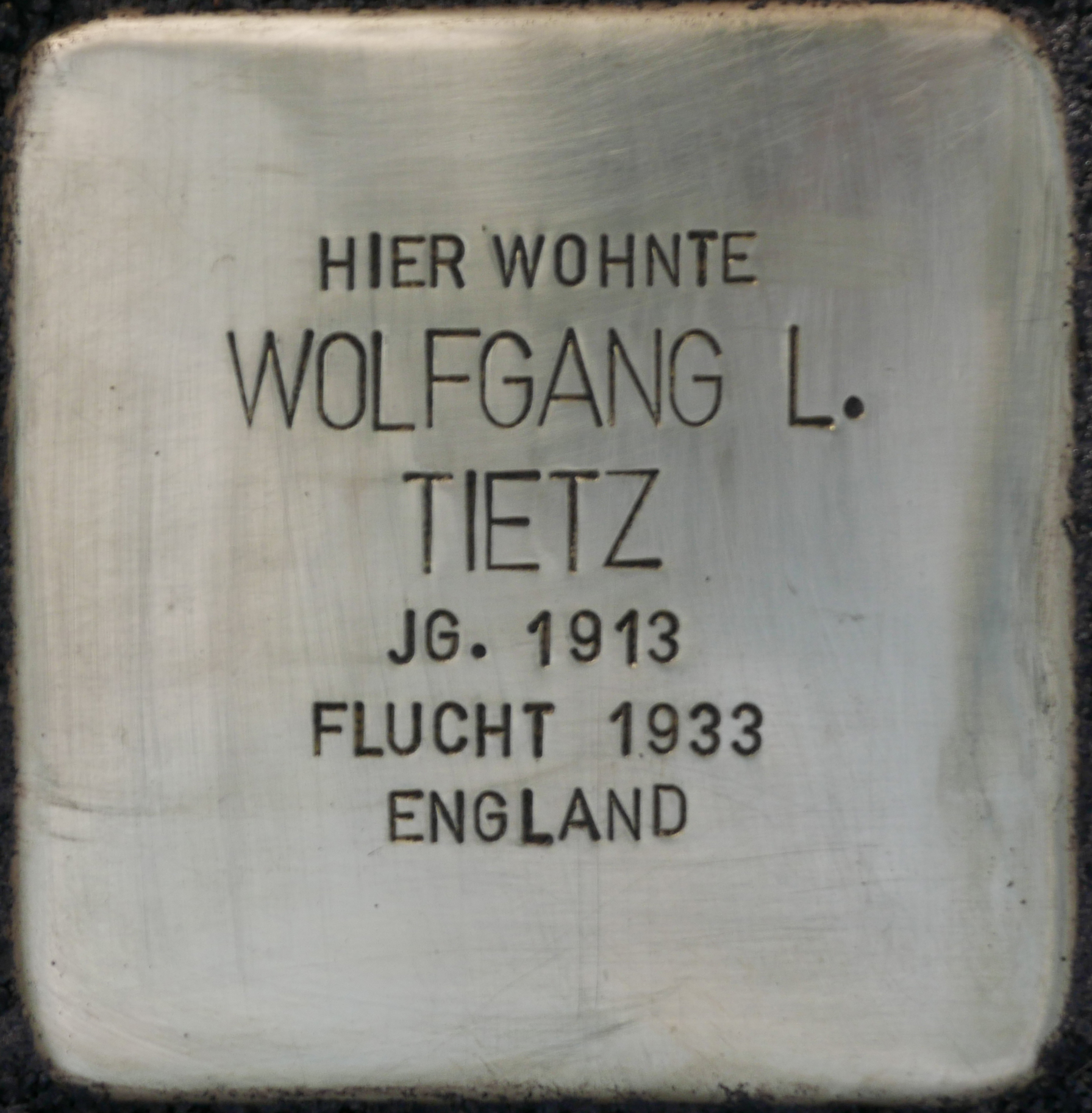
Stolperstein for Wolfgang L. Tietz

== See also ==
- History of the Jews in Cologne
- Tietz Department Store (Elberfeld)
- Aryanization
