= Międzychód =

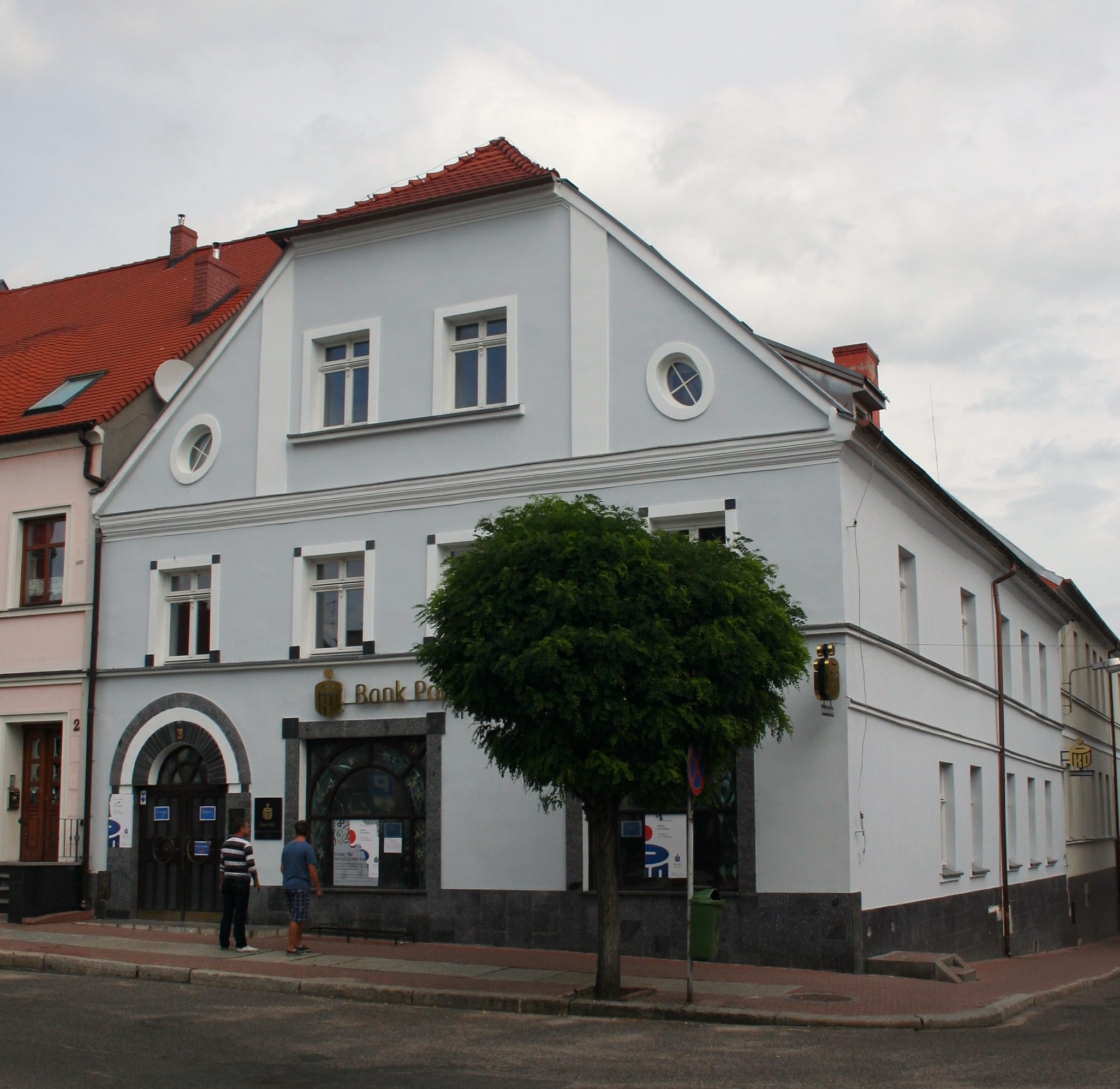
- Market Square

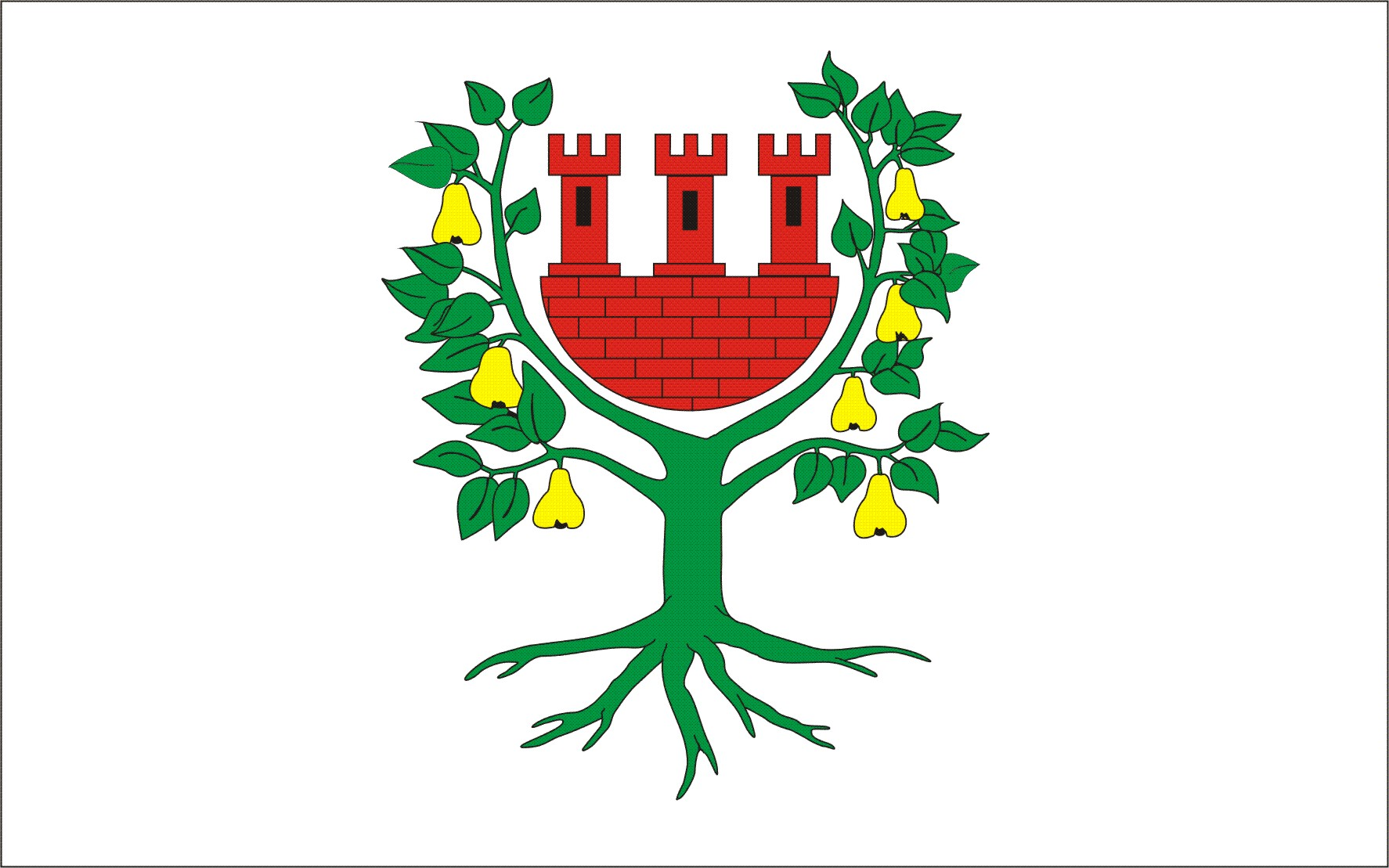
- Flag Coat of arms

- Location within Poland
- Coordinates: 52°36′N 15°53′E
- Country: Poland
- Voivodeship: Greater Poland
- County: Międzychód
- Gmina: Międzychód
- First mentioned: 1378
- Town rights: before 1400

Area
  - Total: 6.98 km^{2} (2.69 sq mi)

Population (2010)
  - Total: 10,844
  - Density: 1,550/km^{2} (4,020/sq mi)
- Time zone: UTC+1 (CET)
  - Summer (DST): UTC+2 (CEST)
- Postal code: 64-400
- Vehicle registration: PMI
- Website: www.miedzychod.pl

Międzychód (pronounced [mʲɛnˈd͡zɨxut]; German: Birnbaum, pronounced [ˈbɪʁnˌbaʊm]) is a town in Greater Poland Voivodeship, Poland, the administrative seat of Międzychód County. It is located on the southern shore of the Warta river, about 75 km (47 mi) west of Poznań. Population is 10,844 (2010).

== History ==
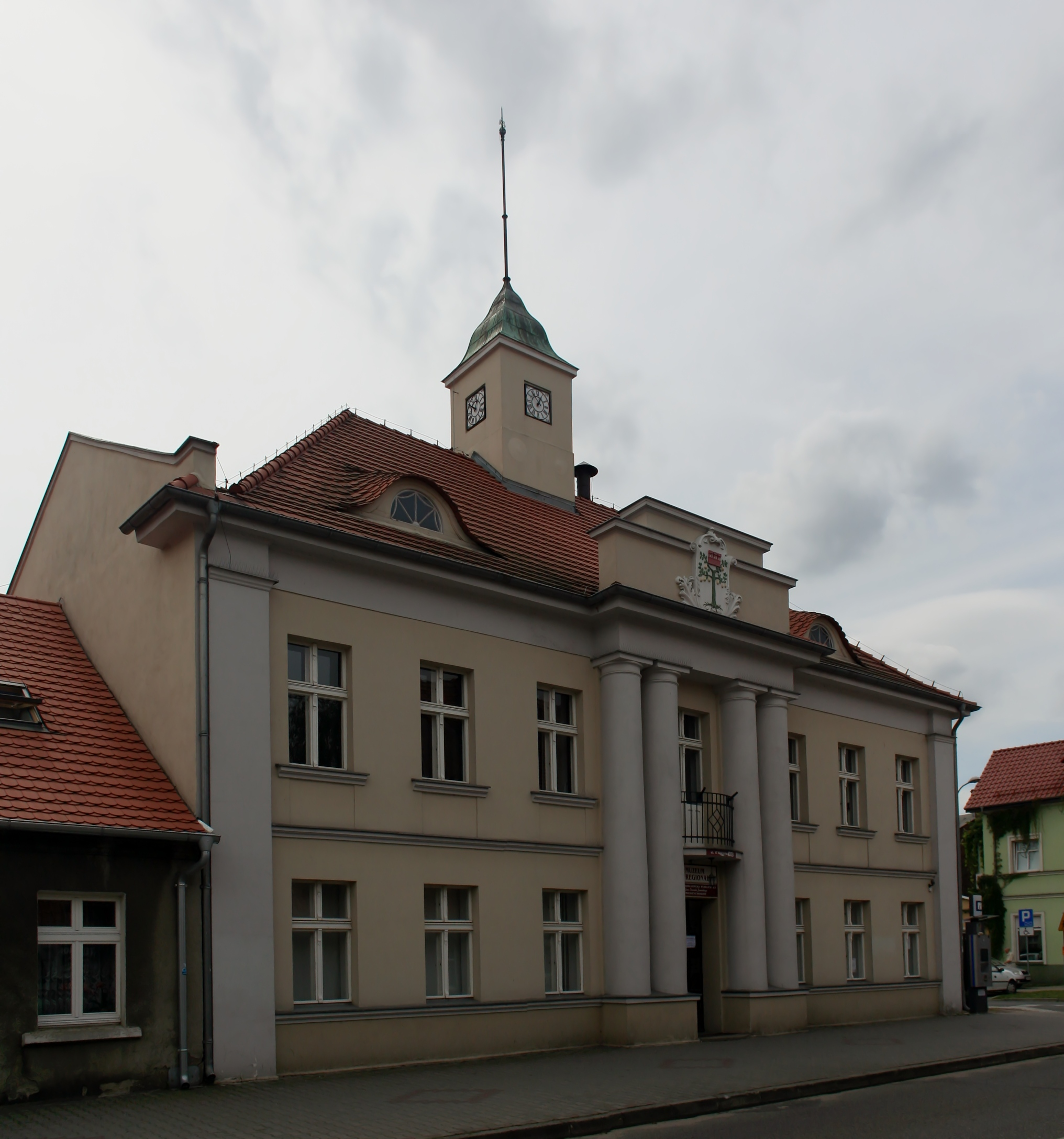
Regional Museum

The town was first mentioned as Międzybrud (after Polish między, "between", bród, "ford") in a 1378 deed. It was a private town of Polish nobility, administratively located in the Poznań County in the Poznań Voivodeship in the Greater Poland Province. It was a settlement area for German artisans and merchants moving into the Polish lands from the adjacent Neumark region. In the 1793 Second Partition of Poland, Międzychód together with the bulk of Greater Poland was annexed by the Kingdom of Prussia as Birnbaum. After the successful Greater Poland uprising of 1806, it was regained by Poles and included within the short-lived Duchy of Warsaw. In 1815 it was reannexed by Prussia, incorporated as the capital of the Kreis Birnbaum in the Regierungsbezirk of Posen, part of the Prussian Grand Duchy of Posen, and from 1871 to 1919 it was also part of Germany. According to the 1910 census, the population of the town was 5,274, of whom 4,500 (85%) reported German as their sole mother tongue, while 749 (14%) reported Polish; the Jewish population was 115 (2%).

Upon the German defeat in World War I, the area was ceded to the newly established Second Polish Republic according to the 1919 Treaty of Versailles, with Międzychód as the westernmost town in Poland, administratively located in the Poznań Voivodeship. In the 1930s, members of the German-speaking population helped create a list of local Poles intended for persecution in the event of the German invasion and occupation. The town was again annexed by Nazi Germany and incorporated into the Reichsgau Wartheland upon the 1939 Invasion of Poland, which started World War II. During the German occupation, Poles from Międzychód were among the victims of large massacres carried out in November 1939 in Mędzisko as part of the Intelligenzaktion. The Germans carried out expulsions of Poles, whoses houses were then handed over to German colonists as part of the Lebensraum policy. Germany established and operated a Nazi prison in the town. In August 1944, the Germans carried out mass arrests of local members of the Home Army, the leading Polish underground resistance organization. Międzychód returned to Poland after World War II in 1945, while the German minority was expelled in accordance with the Potsdam Agreement.

In recent years the town's economy increasingly has relied as a resort for tourism on the surrounding lakes of the Warta valley.

== Demographics ==
Historical population

Year	Pop.	±%
1910	5,274	—
1921	4,017	−23.8%
1931	5,126	+27.6%
1939	5,309	+3.6%

Year	Pop.	±%
1950	5,209	−1.9%
1960	6,936	+33.2%
2010	10,844	+56.3%

== Notable people ==
- Manuel Joël (1826–1890), rabbi and philosopher
- Hermann Tietz (1834–?), rabbi
- Hermann Tietz (1837–1907), merchant ("Hertie" department stores)
- Leonhard Tietz (1849–1914), his nephew, merchant ("Kaufhof")
- Oscar Tietz (1858–1923), his brother, merchant
- Lesser Ury (1861–1931), Impressionist painter
- Carl Hermann Busse (1872–1918), German lyric poet
