= Leonhard Tietz =

German entrepreneur and art collector (1849-1914)

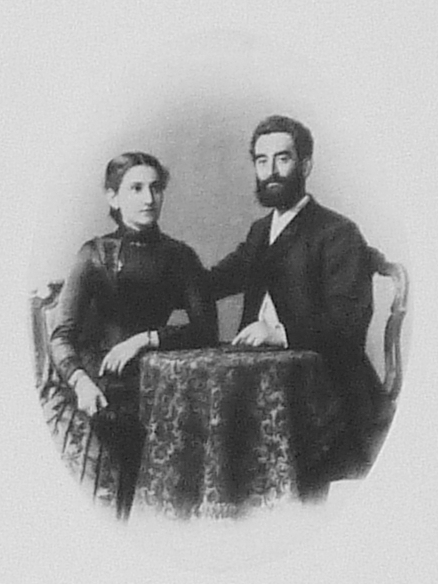
Flora and Leonhard Tietz

Leonhard Tietz (March 3, 1849 - November 14, 1914) was a German department store entrepreneur and art collector of Jewish origin.

== Biography ==
Born in Birnbaum an der Warthe, Province of Posen, Prussia (today Międzychód, Poland), Leonhard Tietz was the brother of Oskar Tietz and a founding member of the Tietz Department store dynasty. On 14 August 1879, he opened his first department store in Stralsund, with the idea of selling high-quality products at fixed prices for cash. He was the first to introduce a money-back guarantee. In 1891, a shop was opened in Cologne. In 1905, his enterprise was transformed into a joint stock company.

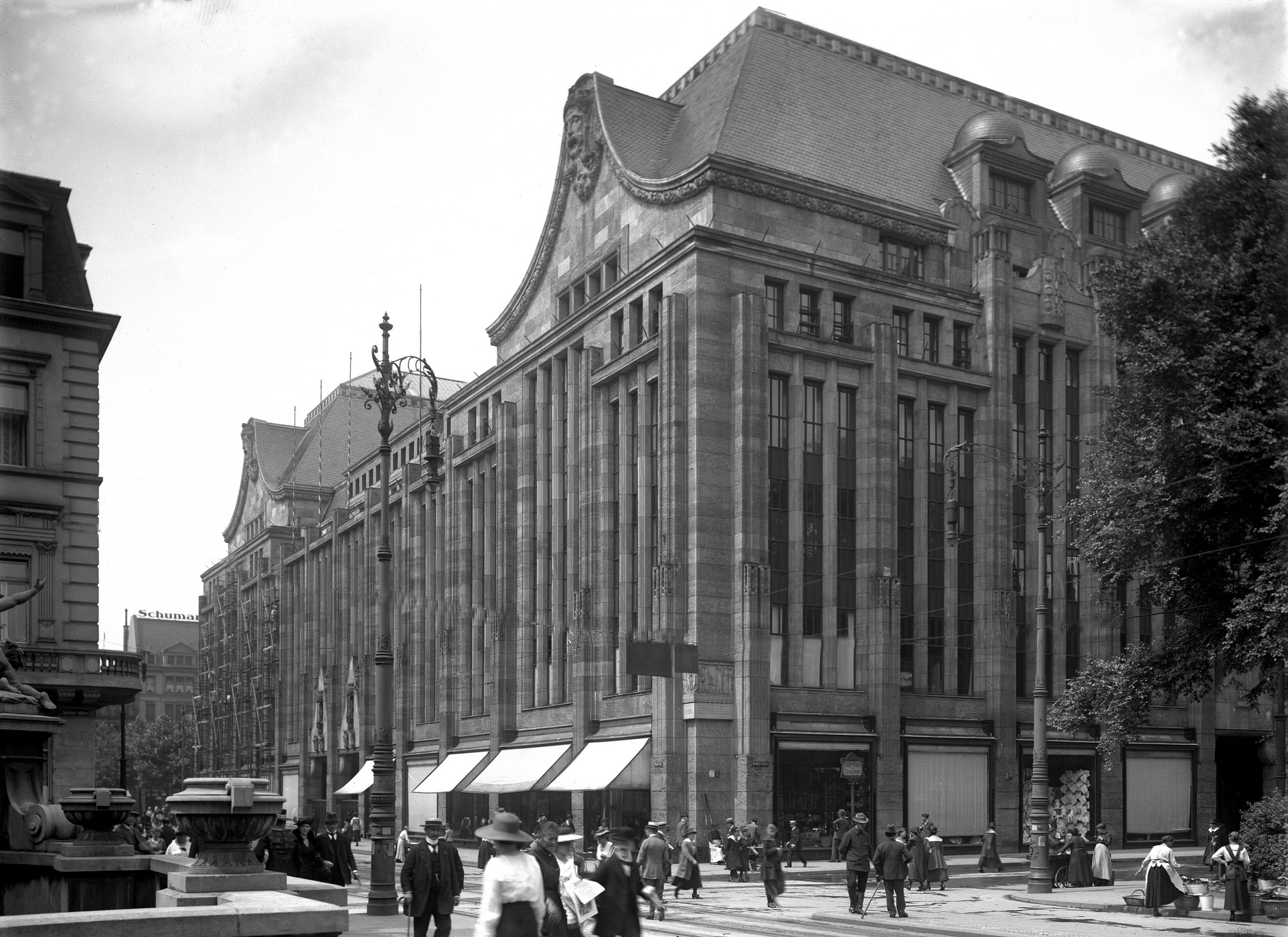
Warenhaus Tietz in Düsseldorf, 1910

The Warenhaus Tietz at the Königsallee in Düsseldorf was entirely designed by Art Nouveau protagonist Joseph Maria Olbrich and opened in 1908. For the Tietz Department Store in Wuppertal Elberfeld Wilhelm Kreis was hired (1910–11), who also was the architect for their new building in Cologne (at the corner of Hohe Straße and Gürzenichstrasse, 1912–14).

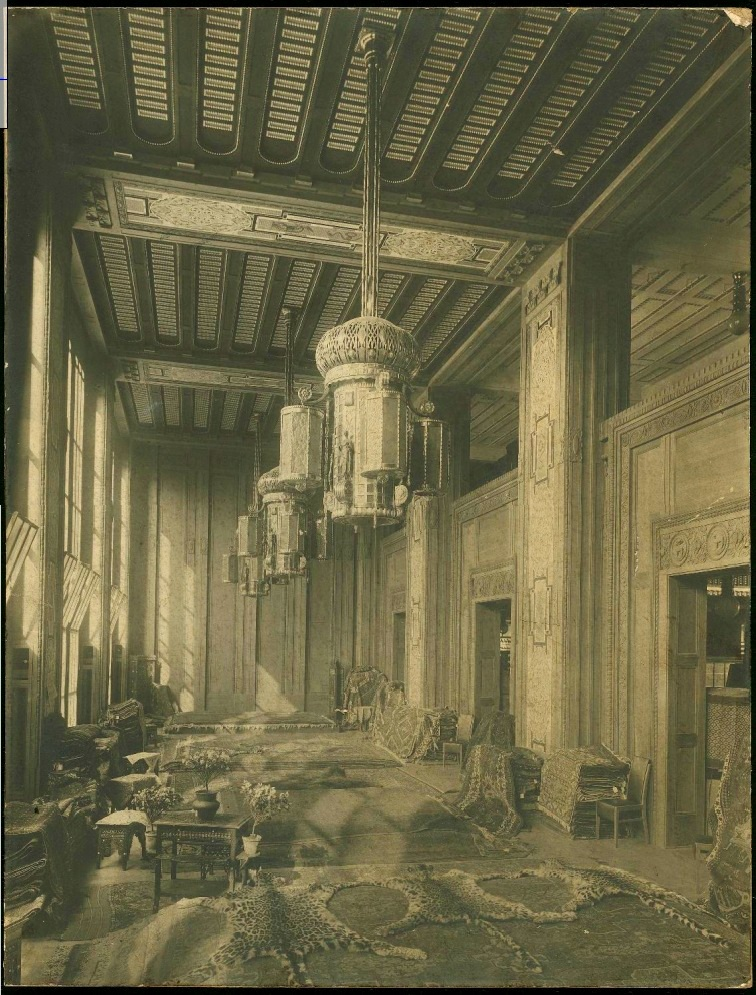
Carpet sale at Warenhaus Tietz in Düsseldorf

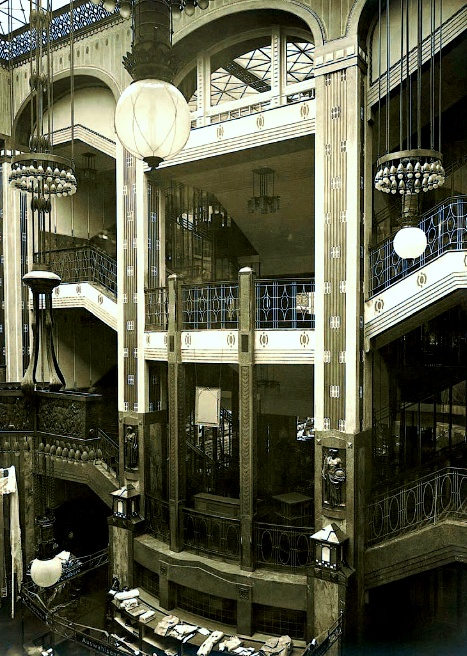
Central areaway of Tietz Department Store in Aachen by Albert Schneiders (1904–06)

== Art collector ==
Tietz owned an art collection which included paintings by Vincent van Gogh and Paul Cézanne. In 1912 he lent a self portrait by van Gogh and a still-life by Cézanne ("Früchte mit Glas und Porzellanschale") to the famous Sonderbund Exhibition in Cologne (Internationale Kunstausstellung des Sonderbundes Westdeutscher Kunstfreunde und Künstler zu Cöln).

== Legacy and loss ==
After Tietz's death, his son Alfred Leonhard Tietz led the Tietz firm. In 1933, the Nazi Party came to power in Germany and Jewish businesses were targeted. The Nazi policy of racial discrimination and anti-semitic harassment of Jewish-managed firms hurt the Tietzs' department store and other businesses. The business was renamed Westdeutsche Kaufhof AG. In an "Aryanisation" (the obligatory transfer of Jewish businesses to non-Jewish owners), the Tietz family was forced to sell their shares under market value. They fled Nazi Germany. After the Allied victory, they received some compensation estimated at 5 million DM.

Today, the department store chain Galeria Kaufhof is the descendant of the tiny shop opened in 1879.

== See also ==
- Aryanization
- The Holocaust
- Department stores
- Tietz Department Store (Elberfeld)
