= Anne Birk =

German author

Anne Birk (real name: Rosemarie Tietz, maiden name Schumacher) (* August 20, 1942 in Trossingen, Germany; † July 29, 2009 in Esslingen, Germany) was a German author.

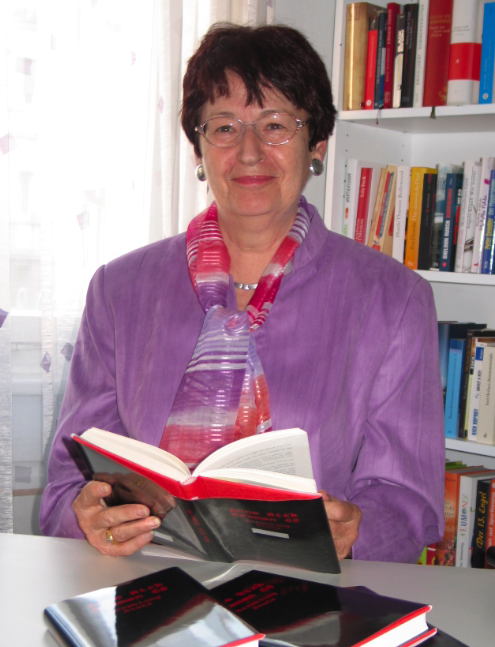
Anne Birk presenting her book 'Examen 68' (2008)

== Biography ==
Rosemarie Schumacher was the daughter of a school teacher. She grew up in Tuttlingen, Germany. She then studied German and English language and literature and became a grammar school teacher in Esslingen, where she lived from 1969 onwards. Around 1980 she began writing. Anne Birk used the maiden name of her mother as her nom de plume.

Her husband Gerold Tietz was also an author. The couple was childless. Gerold Tietz died just a few days before his wife.

== Works ==
Anne Birk wrote a trilogy on German history: Astern im Frost (1999), Weiße Flecken an der Wand (2000) and Scherbengericht (2002). Partly basing the novels on the life of her mother, Anne Birk is one of the very few German authors dealing critically with the German history of the 20th century from a very personal family and village perspective, not just from a global perspective of the entire nation.

Anne Birk also wrote the novel Carlos oder Vorgesehene Verheerungen in unseren blühenden Provinzen. The novel Kein Wunder could not be published any more before her death.

Besides these novels Anne Birk wrote the theater play Nestbeschmutzung, and she published Zumutungen - Frauen und ein Paragraph, a book on the obligatory advice before abortion established by German legislation around 1990 (so called "§218").

Anne Birk further wrote a number of narrations: Der Ministerpräsident, Bernies Bergung, Das nächste Mal bringe ich Rosen oder Warum Descartes sich weigert, seine Mutter zu baden as well as Examen 68. The latter dealt with the students' life in the famous German university town of Tübingen during the 1960s.

== Trivia ==
Going back 10 generations Anne Birk is a relative of Barack Obama.
