= Dubá =

- Town
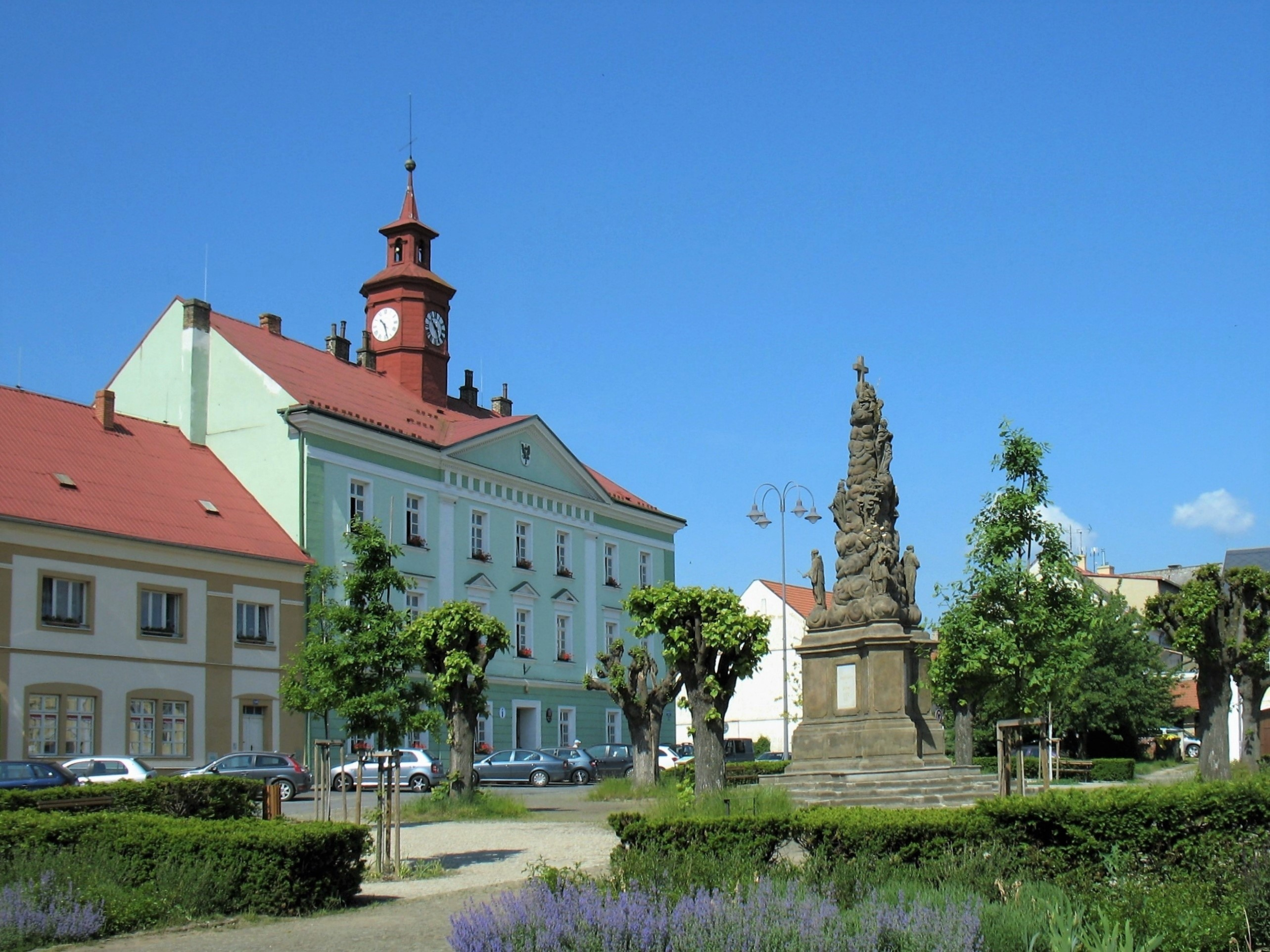
- Town hall and Holy Trinity column

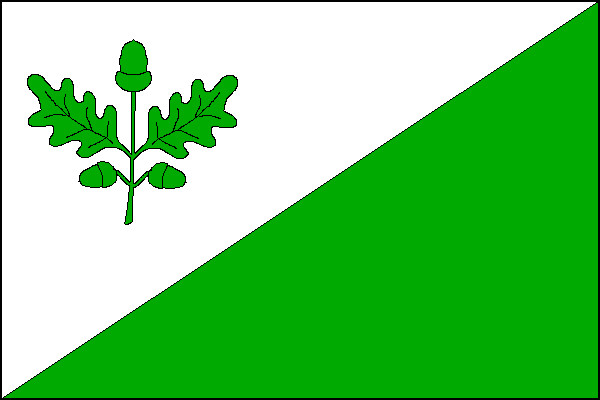
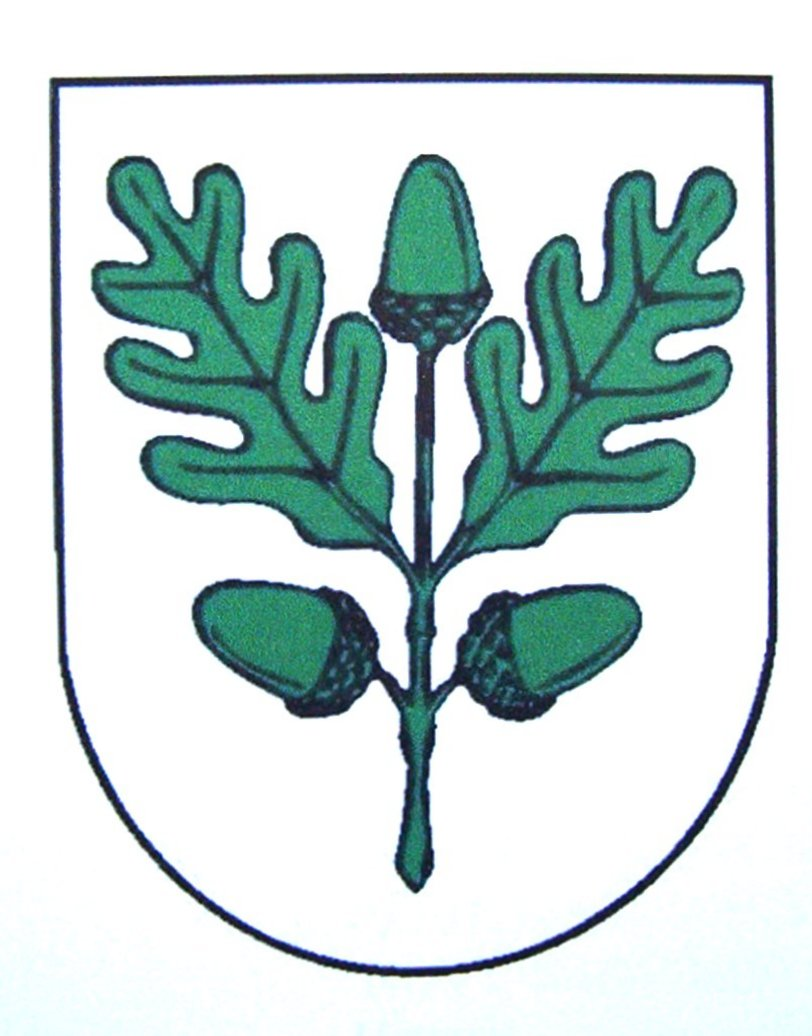
- Flag Coat of arms

- Location in the Czech Republic
- Coordinates: 50°32′21″N 14°32′34″E
- Country: Czech Republic
- Region: Liberec
- District: Česká Lípa
- First mentioned: 1253

Government
  - Mayor: Irena Žalovičová

Area
  - Total: 60.60 km^{2} (23.40 sq mi)
- Elevation: 266 m (873 ft)

Population (2026-01-01)
  - Total: 1,682
  - Density: 27.76/km^{2} (71.89/sq mi)
- Time zone: UTC+1 (CET)
  - Summer (DST): UTC+2 (CEST)
- Postal codes: 471 41, 472 01
- Website: www.mestoduba.cz

Dubá (Czech pronunciation: [ˈdubaː]; German: Dauba) is a town in Česká Lípa District in the Liberec Region of the Czech Republic. It has about 1,700 inhabitants. The town is located in the Ralsko Uplands.

Dubá was founded in the 13th century at the latest and is connected with the Berka of Dubá noble family, who owned the town until 1622. The historic town centre is well preserved and is protected as an urban monument zone. The main landmark of Dubá is the Church of the Finding the Holy Cross.

== Administrative division ==
Dubá consists of 20 municipal parts (in brackets population according to the 2021 census):

- Dubá (1,135)
- Bukovec (10)
- Deštná (102)
- Dražejov (12)
- Dřevčice (98)
- Heřmánky (21)
- Horky (20)
- Horní Dubová Hora (6)
- Kluk (2)
- Korce (37)
- Křenov (8)
- Lhota (18)
- Nedamov (38)
- Nedvězí (16)
- Nový Berštejn (35)
- Panská Ves (11)
- Plešivec (10)
- Sušice (10)
- Zakšín (69)
- Zátyní (23)

== Etymology ==
The name Dubá is derived from the Czech word dub, i.e. 'oak'.

== Geography ==
Dubá is located about 15 kilometres (9 mi) south of Česká Lípa and 48 km (30 mi) north of Prague. It lies in the Ralsko Uplands. The highest point is the hill Korecký vrch at 465 m (1,526 ft) above sea level. The Liběchovka Stream flows through municipal territory, to the east and to the south of the town proper. The stream supplies here three fishponds: Černý rybník, Rozprechtický rybník and a nameless pond. Černý rybník is used for recreational purposes, while Rozprechtický rybník is used for fish farming. Most of the territory of Dubá lies in the Kokořínsko – Máchův kraj Protected Landscape Area.

== History ==
According to archaeological finds, there was an old Slavic settlement, existing from the first half of the 11th century. The first written mention of Dubá and the Lords of Dubá is from 1253. The Berka of Dubá family owned the town until 1622. After the Battle of White Mountain, their properties were confiscated and Dubá was acquired by Albrecht von Wallenstein. After that, the owners of Dubá often changed.

Because of large fires in 1692, 1711 and 1845, Dubá never became a large town.

From 1938 to 1945, Dubá was annexed by Nazi Germany and administered as a part of the Reichsgau Sudetenland. After World War II, the German-speaking population was expelled.

== Demographics ==
Historical population

Year	Pop.	±%
1869	5,023	—
1880	5,133	+2.2%
1890	4,751	−7.4%
1900	4,393	−7.5%
1910	4,021	−8.5%

Year	Pop.	±%
1921	3,992	−0.7%
1930	3,802	−4.8%
1950	2,409	−36.6%
1961	2,391	−0.7%
1970	2,116	−11.5%

Year	Pop.	±%
1980	1,999	−5.5%
1991	1,723	−13.8%
2001	1,757	+2.0%
2011	1,753	−0.2%
2021	1,681	−4.1%

Source: Censuses

== Transport ==
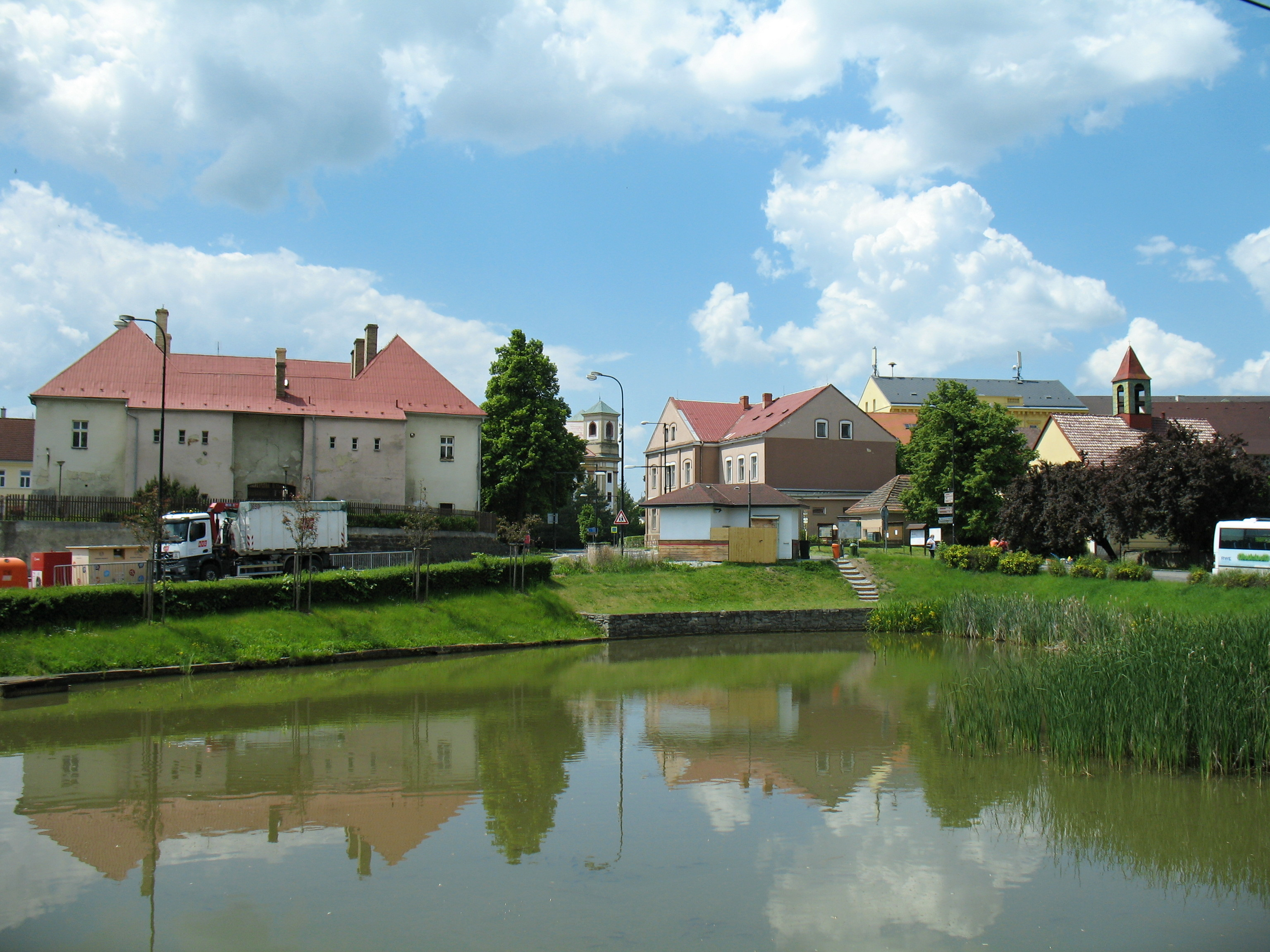
Central part of Dubá

The I/9 road (the section from Česká Lípa to Mělník) runs through the municipality.

== Sights ==
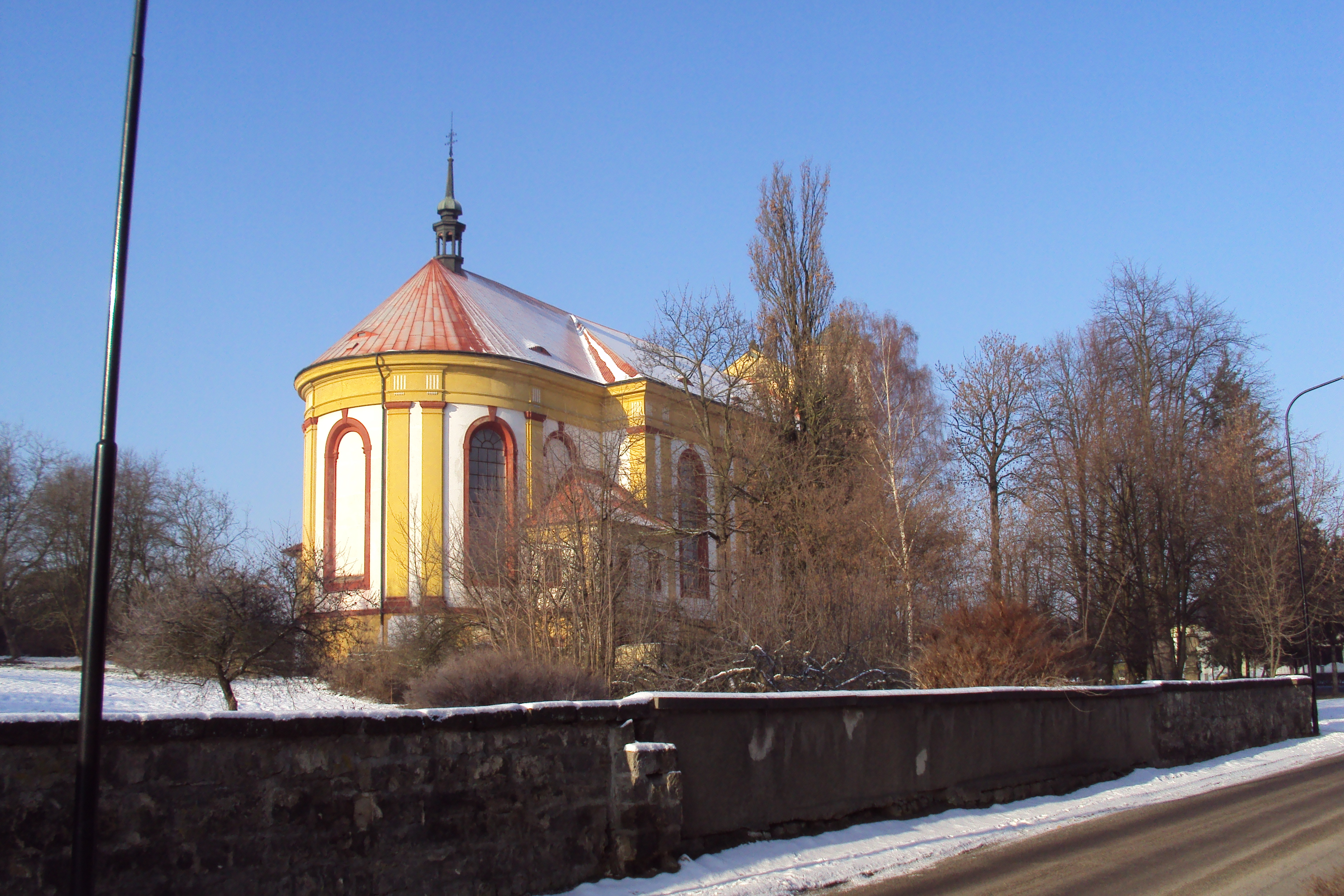
Church of the Finding the Holy Cross

The main landmark of Dubá is the Church of the Finding the Holy Cross. It was built in the late Baroque style in 1744–1760. The interior is equipped with Rococo furniture.

Nový Berštejn Castle was built in 1553–1567. In 1945, it was confiscated by the state and adapted to a special boarding school. After falling into disrepair, it was to be demolished, but it was bought by a private owner in 1991 and repaired. Since 1997, the castle has been used as a hotel with a sports complex.

== Notable people ==
- Gerold Tietz (1941–2009), German writer

== Twin towns – sister cities ==
Dubá is twinned with:

- Mirsk, Poland
