= Gerold Tietz =

German author

Gerold Tietz (November 11, 1941, in Horka near Dauba, Sudetenland, Germany – July 24, 2009, in Esslingen, Germany) was a German author.

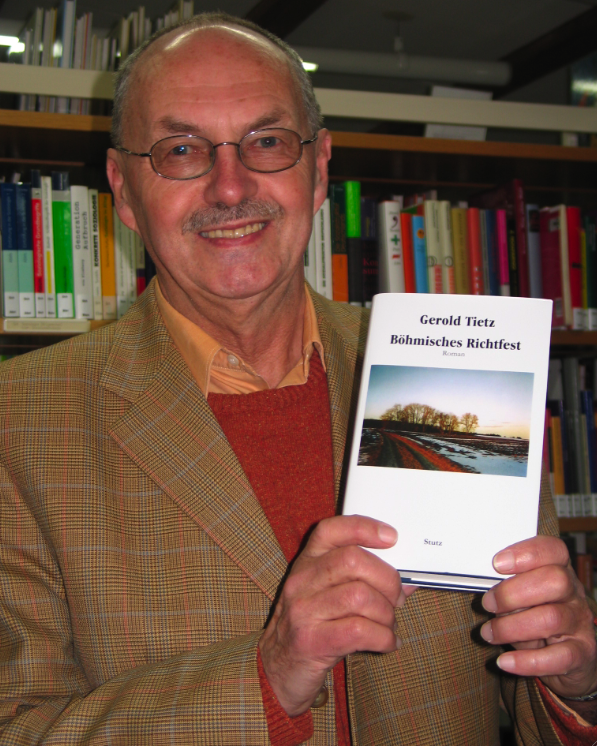
Gerold Tietz presenting his book 'Böhmisches Richtfest' (2007)

== Biography ==
Gerold Tietz was born in Bohemia. As a child he and his family were banished. They first moved to the federal state of Bavaria in Germany, and later to Baden-Württemberg. He studied history, politics and French in Tübingen, Berlin and Paris. Gerold Tietz held a doctor's degree in history. During the last decades he lived in Esslingen and worked in the nearby city of Wendlingen as a grammar school teacher.

He published his first book in 1989. In 2006 he received the first prize for prose by the Künstlergilde Esslingen, and he was elected to become a member of the Sudetendeutsche Akademie der Wissenschaften und Künste (Sudeten German academy of science and art). In 2007 he received the Sudetendeutscher Kulturpreis für Literatur (prize for literature awarded by the Sudeten German organisation). Gerold Tietz is one of the few writers to address the banishments of the 20th century in the region of Bohemia critically from all sides, avoiding to subjectively consider only one side as aggressor and the other as victim.

His wife Anne Birk was also an author. The couple was childless. Anne Birk died just a few days after her husband (July 29, 2009).

== Works ==
Gerold Tietz wrote the prose volume Satiralien - Berichte aus Beerdita (1989) as well as the four closely connected novels Böhmische Fuge (1997), Große Zeiten - kleines Glück (2005), Böhmisches Richtfest (2007) und Böhmische Grätschen (2009). A follow up novel on Große Zeiten - kleines Glück could not be published any more before his death.

The novel Böhmische Fuge was translated into Czech in 2005 with the title Česká Fuga. The translation of Böhmische Grätschen could not be finished any more before his death, but was published posthumously in 2012 with the title České Kotrmelce.

== Trivia ==
The painter Georg Koschinski from Esslingen contributed the ink drawings for the novel Böhmische Fuge.

The chapter Annas Himmelfahrt from the novel Böhmisches Richtfest was set to music as a melodrama by the composer Dr.Dietmar Gräf. It was premiered by the Malinconia-Ensemble in 2008 at Bad Wörishofen.

The title photo of the novel Böhmische Grätschen is taken by Jindřich Štreit, one of the most important Czech documentary photographers.
