= Oscar Tietz =

Jewish-German businessman

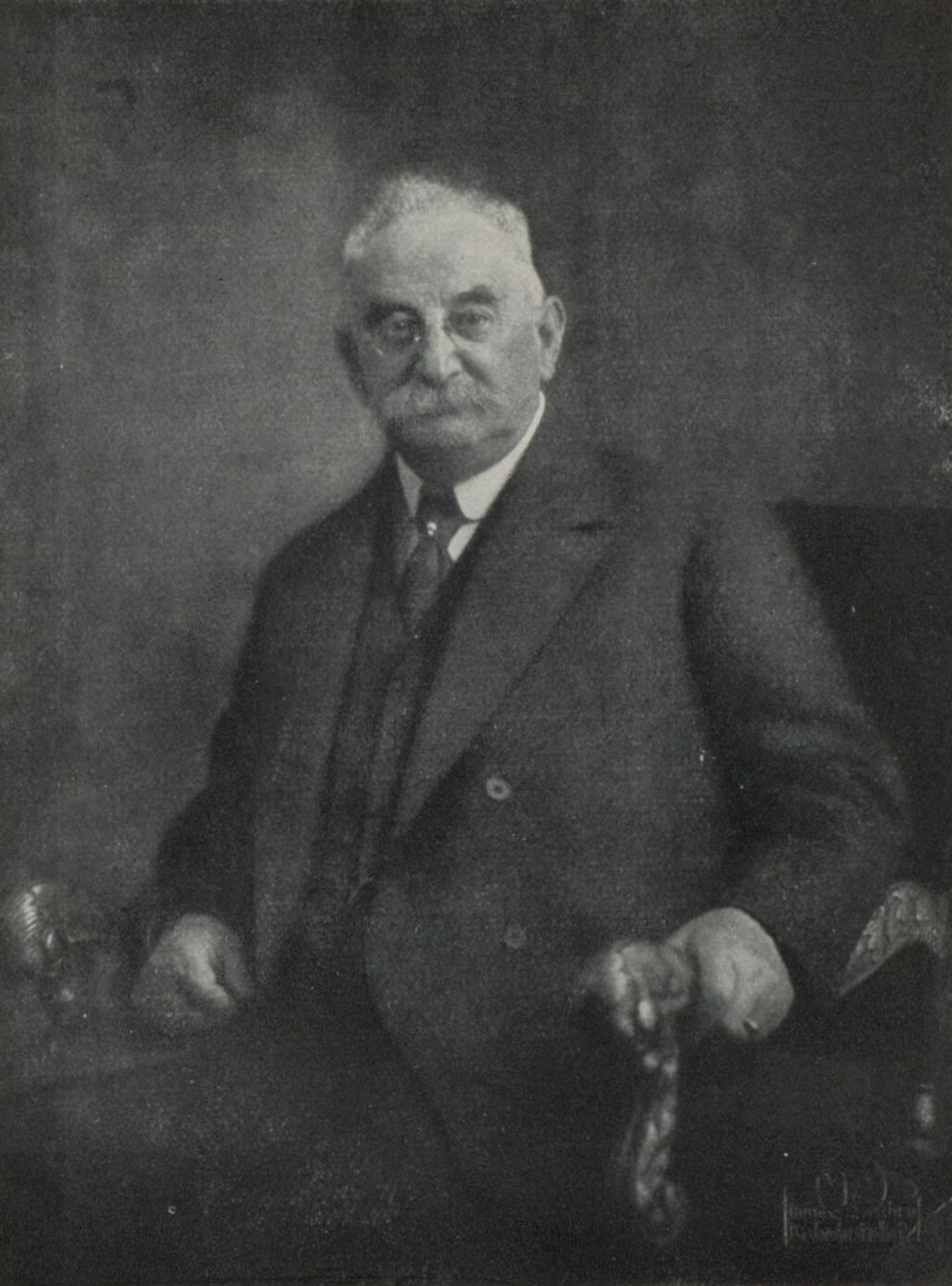
Oscar Tietz

Oscar Tietz (18 April 1858 – 17 January 1923) was a Jewish-German businessman (Unternehmer).

He was born in Birnbaum/Warthe (Międzychód) near Posen, in what was then the Kingdom of Prussia and is now Poland. The brother of Leonhard Tietz, and a nephew of Hermann Tietz, he joined his uncle's department store concern, in Berlin, Tietz Department Store (Elberfeld).

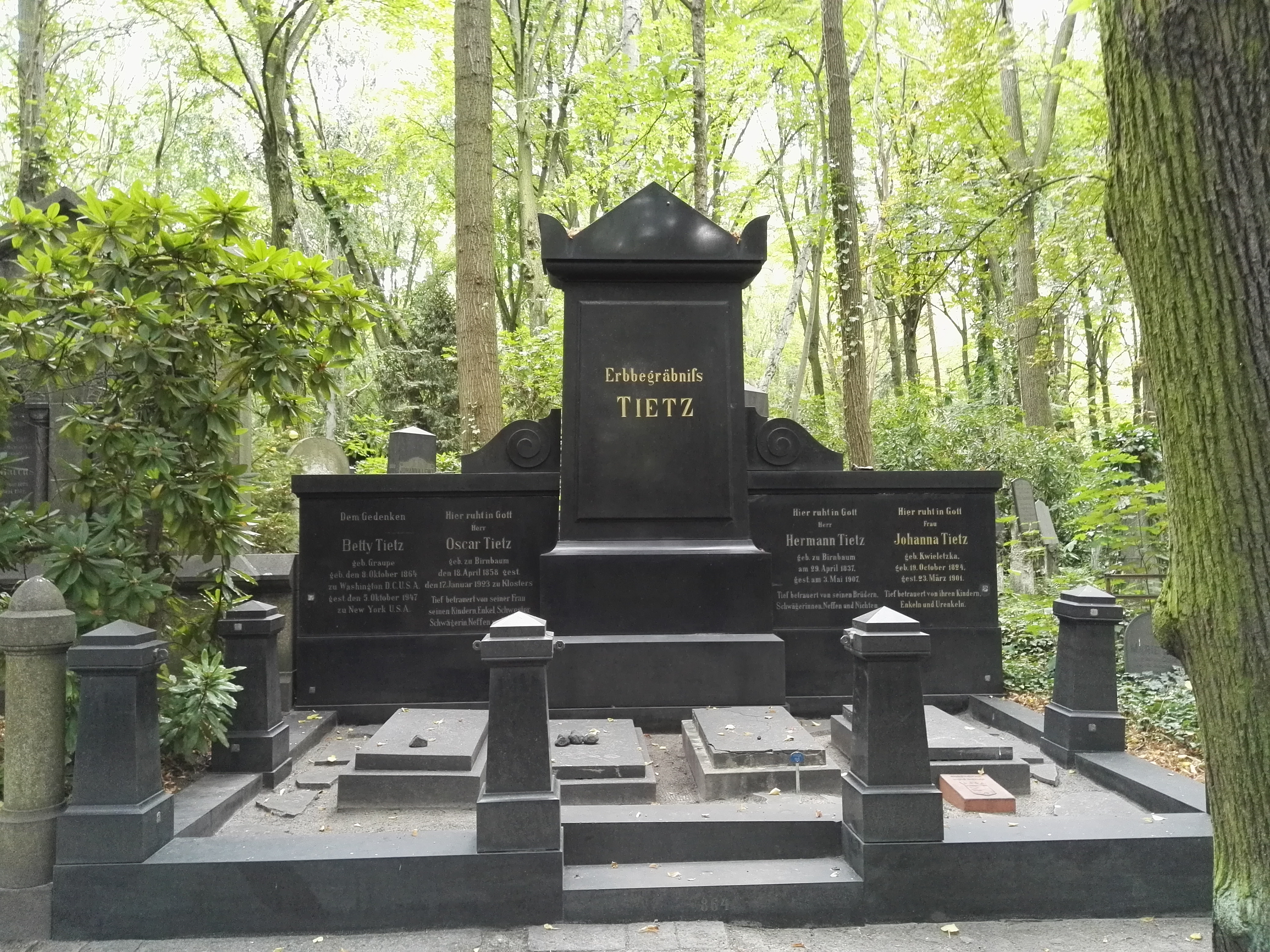
Grave of Tietz in Weißensee

Oscar Tietz died in Klosters, Switzerland at age 64.

== Legacy ==
When the Nazis came to power the departments stores the Tietz founded were Aryanized, that is forcibly transferred to non-Jewish owners. The Tietz department stores became part of Hertie, KaDeWe.

Postwar claims were filed by the Tietz family concerning the expropriation of property under the Nazis.

== See also ==
- Leonhard Tietz
- Hermann Tietz
- Tietz Department Store (Elberfeld)
