= Alfred Leonhard Tietz =

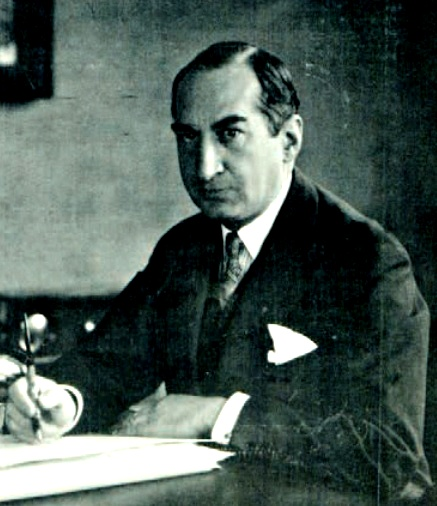
Alfred Leonhard Tietz before 1933

Alfred Leonhard Tietz (born June 8, 1883 in Stralsund; died August 4, 1941 in Jerusalem) was a German-Jewish department store entrepreneur forced into exile by the Nazis. He was the eldest son of department store founder Leonhard Tietz.

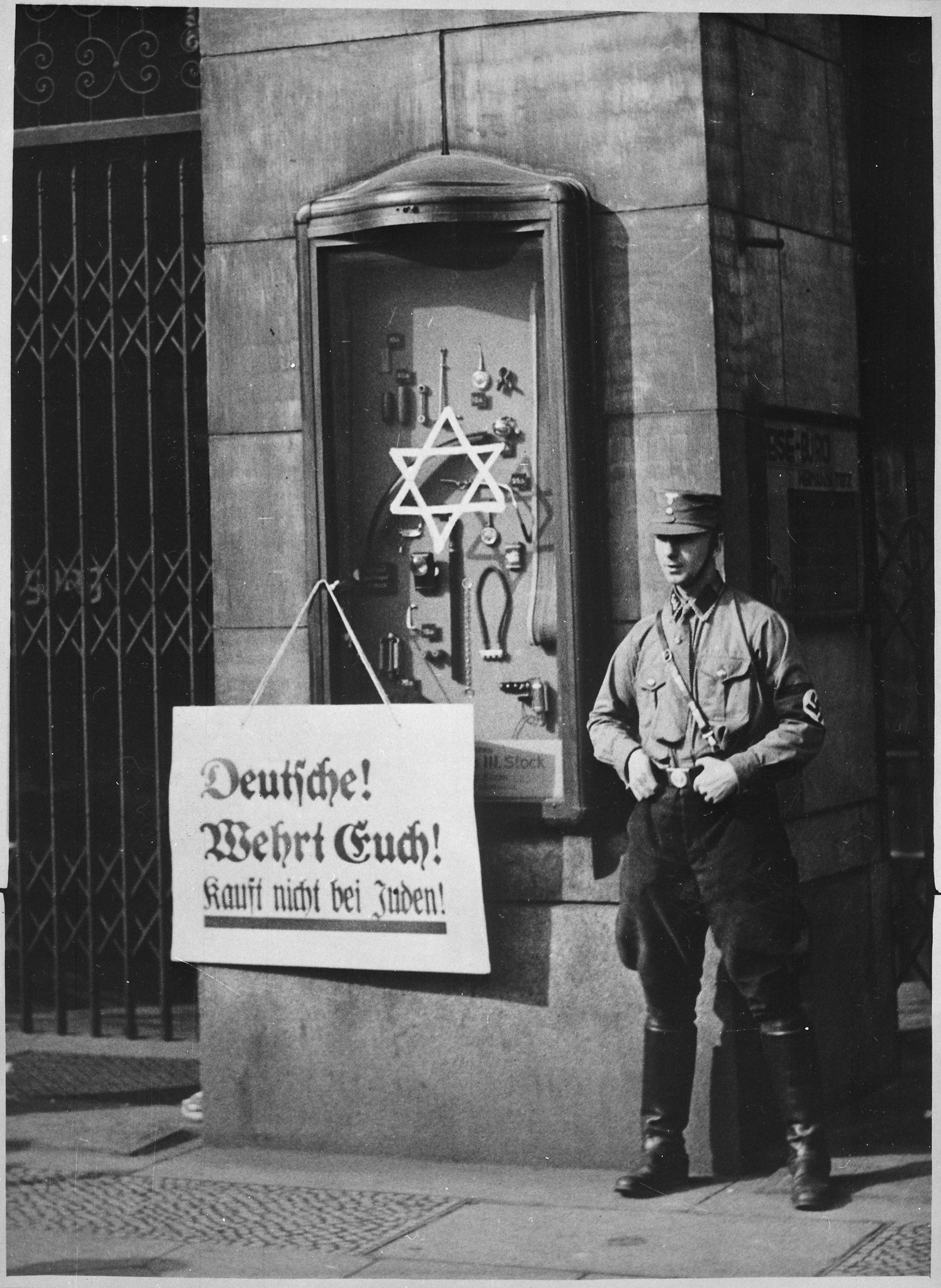
SA member in front of the Tietz department store in Berlin during the boycott of Jews on April 1, 1933

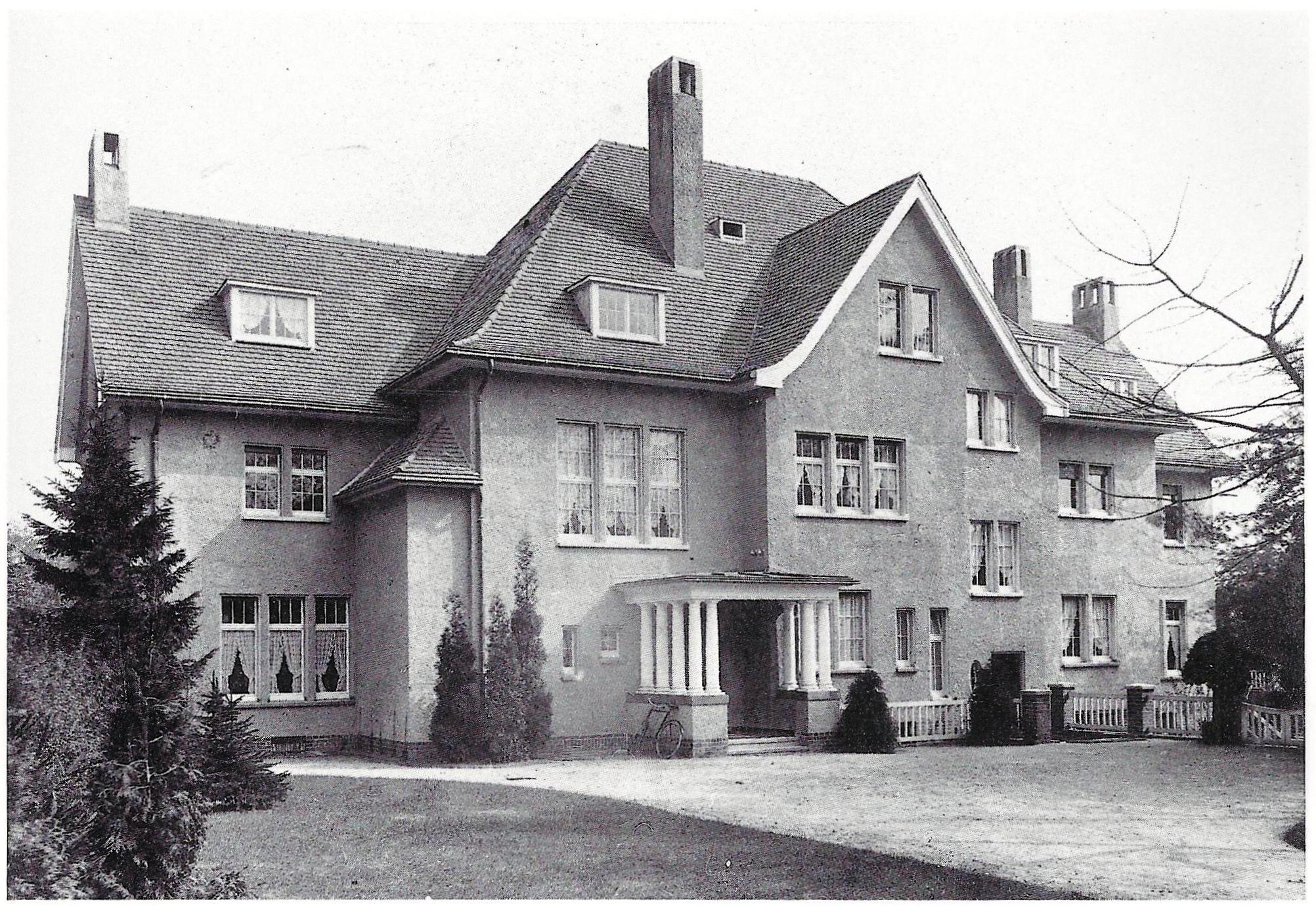
Parkstraße 61 – Villa Tietz 1909

== Life ==
Alfred Tietz was born into the Tietz family department store dynasty. After graduating from commercial college in Cologne, Alfred Leonhard worked as an apprentice in his father Leonhard Tietz's department store, where he was promoted to authorized signatory in 1907. By 1910, he was already a member of the company's management board.

In 1909, he married Margarete Caecilie Dzialoszynski, the daughter of a Jewish wholesaler from Berlin. After the death of his father in 1914, Alfred took over the department store group Leonard Tietz AG with 5,000 employees at the age of 31. The head office of the multi-department department store was relocated to Cologne in 1891. Under Alfred's management, the Tietz Group already had 43 branches with 15,000 employees in 1929.

Alfred Tietz was drafted into military service during the First World War. During this time, his wife took on numerous charitable and social tasks in Cologne. After the war, Alfred Tietz continued to expand the company despite the difficulties caused by hyperinflation. The couple were among the respected liberal representatives of Cologne Jewry. Alfred Tietz was a member of the German Trade and Industry Association and on the board of numerous charitable organizations, such as the Jewish Hospital and the Board of Trustees of the Jewish Asylum.

== Nazi era ==
Shortly after Adolf Hitler came to power in Germany, Jewish businesses were boycotted on April 1, 1933. Nazi SA terror against several Tietz branches and threats to cancel all credit lines forced Tietz to resign from the company board as the company was "Ayranized" with an "Aryan majority on the board". Otto Baier, who was not Jewish, took over the management of the department store group. Tietz resigned from the Honorary Board of Directors on April 3, 1933 and from the Supervisory Board of the Group on September 25, 1934. He and his partner Julius Schloss were forced to sell their shares, whose market value had plummeted due to Nazi persecution. Since then, Commerzbank, Deutsche Bank and Dresdner Bank have been the owners of the group, which was renamed "West-Deutscher Kaufhof" in July 1933.

== Flight from the Nazis ==
In 1933, Alfred Tietz and his wife Margarete fled Cologne to the Saar region, which was under the supervision of the League of Nations until 1935, for fear of anti-Semitic actions. In 1934 he emigrated to Amsterdam, where his mother Flora and his three children took refuge in April 1933. Just before the Nazi Wehrmacht marched into Amsterdam, he escaped on the last ship to Palestine, where he died in Jerusalem on August 4, 1941.

== Villa Tietz ==
His father Leonhard Tietz lived in a villa with a large park in Cologne-Marienburg at Parkstrasse 61. The property was built around 1909 and was inherited by Alfred and his family after his father's death.

After Alfred Tietz fled the Nazis, the villa was acquired in 1940 by consul Gustav Valentin Roosen. Burned in the war, it was reconstructed by the British who used it as the headquarters of the British Forces Broadcasting Service starting on February 1, 1954. The British set up radio studios and a record archive.

== Honors ==
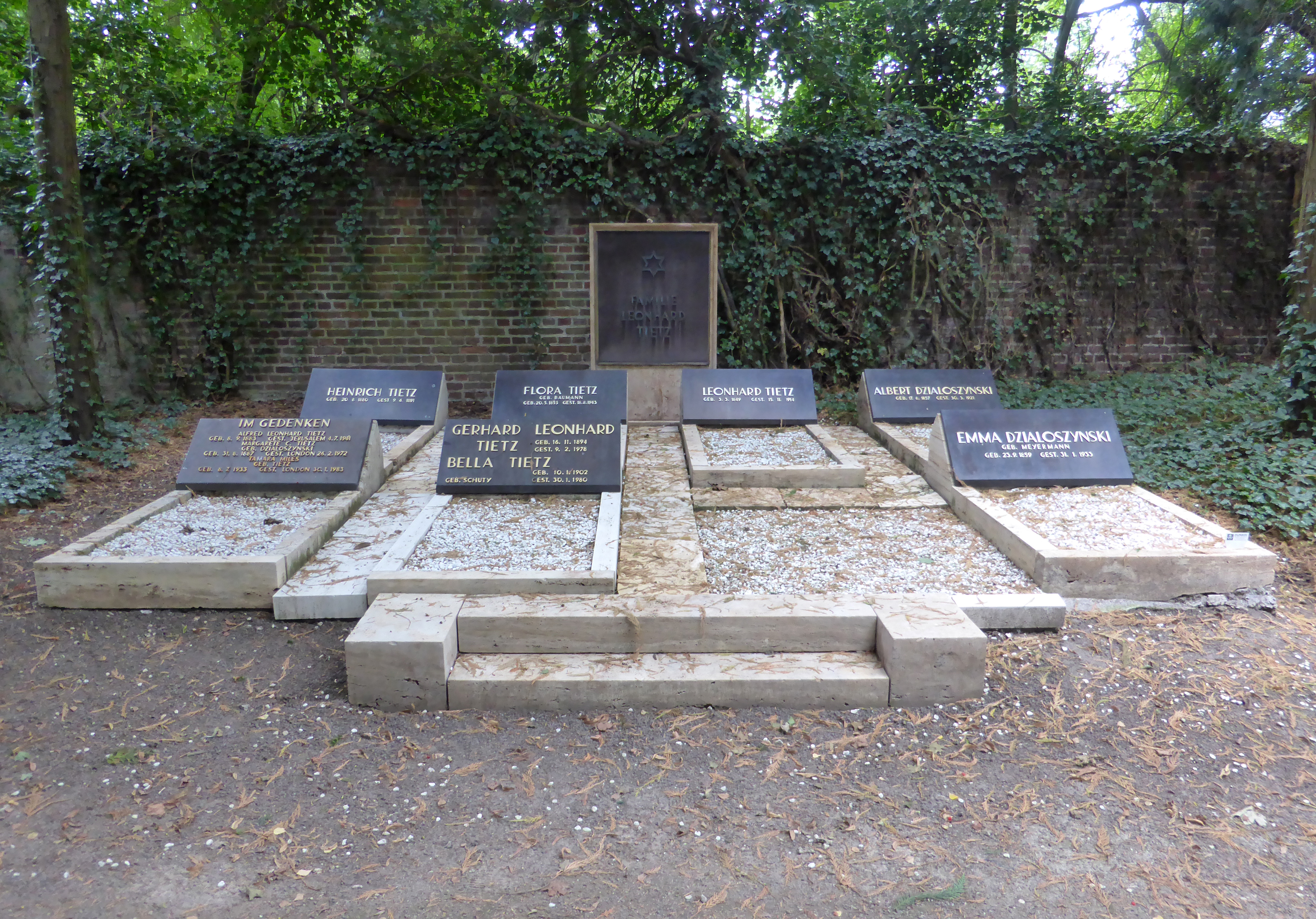
Gedenktafel für Margarete und Alfred L. Tietz (links vorn) auf dem Jüdischen Friedhof Köln-Bocklemünd

In the Jewish cemetery in Cologne-Bocklemünd, a memorial plaque commemorates the married couple Margarete and Alfred L. Tietz.

On March 18, 2019, on the initiative of the Rhineland Cologne section of the German Alpine Club, commemorative stumbling blocks (stolperstein) in memory of Alfred Leonhard Tietz and his family were laid by the artist Gunter Demnig in front of the former home at Parkstrasse 61 and at his place of work at Gürzenichstrasse 2

- Tietz, Alfred Leonhard, in: Werner Röder, Herbert A. Strauss (Hrsg.): Biographisches Handbuch der deutschsprachigen Emigration nach 1933. Band 1: Politik, Wirtschaft, Öffentliches Leben. München : Saur 1980, S. 762f.
