= Hermann Tietz (rabbi) =

German rabbi

Hermann Tietz (September 3, 1834, (Birnbaum an der Warthe, today Międzychód), Kreis Birnbaum, Posen district, Germany) was a German rabbi.

He was educated at the University of Berlin (Ph.D. Halle). He was rabbi in Schrimm, and from 1888 was a Stiftrabbiner and teacher in the bet ha-midrash at Inowrazlaw. He published Das Hohe Lied, translated in verse, and with notes according to the Midrash (Berlin, 1878); and Megillat Eka, with a metrical translation and a Hebrew commentary, under the title Zikron Yehudah (Schrimm, 1881).
