= Tietz Department Store =

Building in Wuppertal, Germany

Coordinates: 51.258477°N 7.144772°E

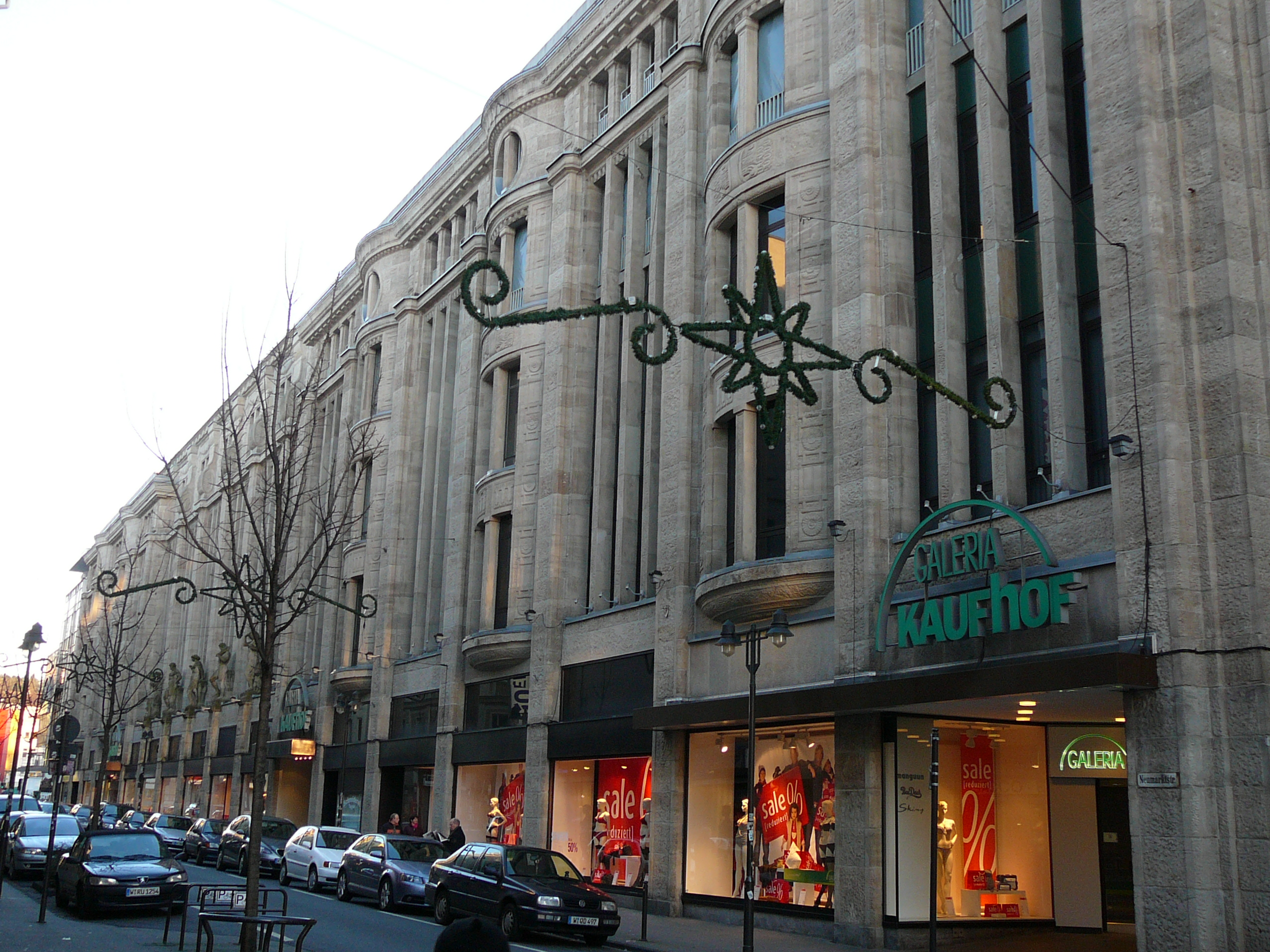
North facade

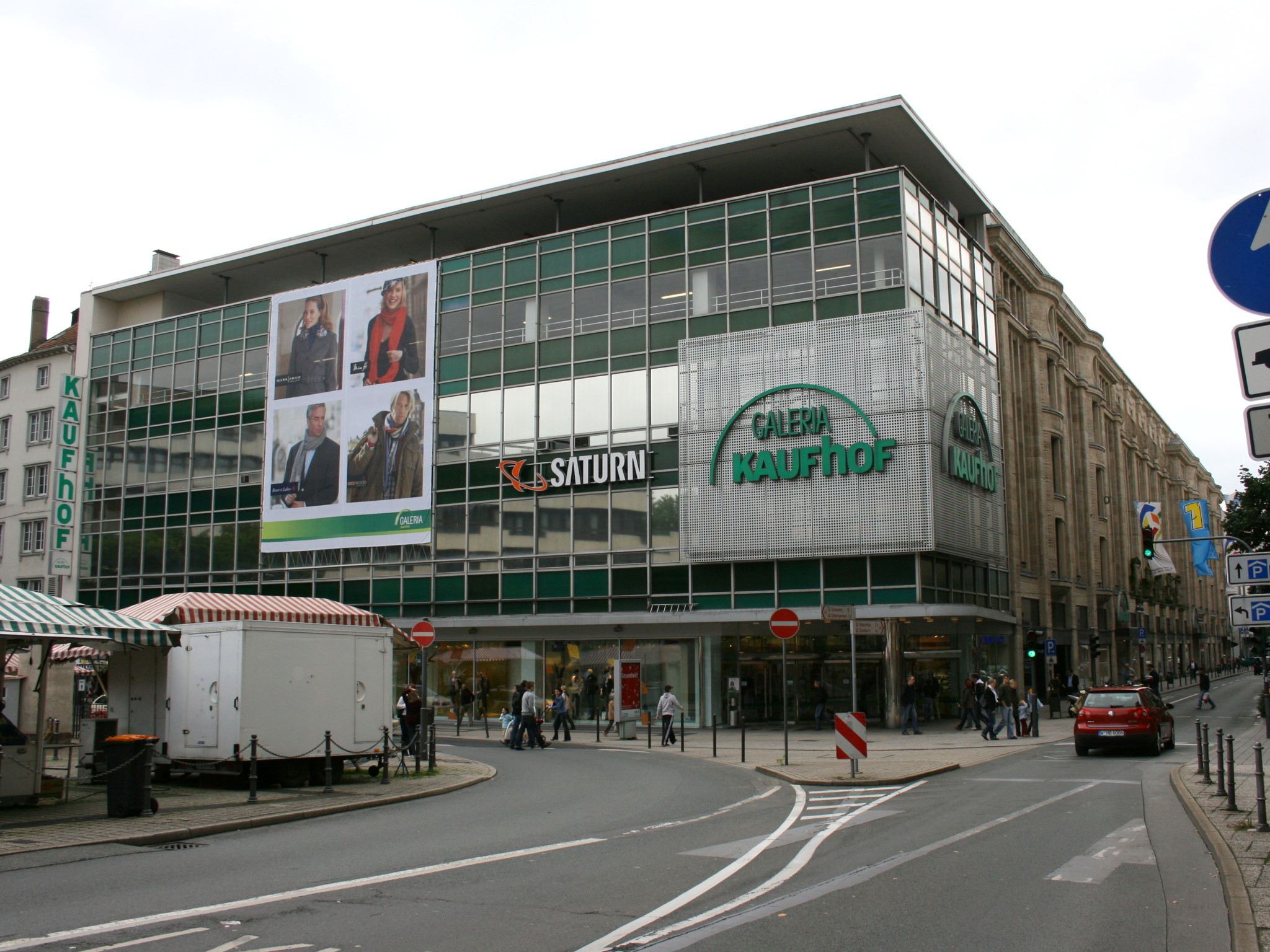
The eastern side to Neumarkt

The Tietz department store in Wuppertal-Elberfeld (today Galeria Kaufhof) is a department store architecturally significant for its integration of classical order with modern structural iron and glass. During the Nazi era it was seized from its Jewish owners.

== Early history ==
The Tietz department store was cofounded by Hermann Tietz (1837–1907) in 1882.

The building was designed by Wilhelm Kreis, one of the leading architects of the time, who also designed the Bismarck Tower in Wuppertal, on behalf of Leonhard Tietz AG as a multi-department store based on the French model. It was built in 1911/1912 and opened on April 24, 1912, at Neumarkt in Elberfeld (today No. 26). The immense variety of goods under one roof offered the population of the time a completely new shopping experience. Prior to this, a first branch existed on Herzogstrasse from 1885, which was considered Germany's first department store.

== Nazi-era seizure ==
When the Nazis came to power in Germany in 1933, the Tietz were persecuted because of their Jewish heritage. The store was boycotted. All businesses of the Tietz family were "Aryanized" (i.e., seized from Jews and transferred to non-Jewish owners) and the family members emigrated. The Tietz department store was "aryanised" in 1934.

Oscar Tietz's son Martin Tietz migrated with his wife to Liechtenstein in 1939 and his assets were seized by the Gestapo.[3]

In 1933, Georg Karg, the new non-Jewish owner, changed the company's name to "Hertie Department Stores" as an abbreviation of Hermann Tietz. Oscar Tietz's son-in-law, Hugo Zwillenberg was arrested by the Gestapo in 1938 and imprisoned in Sachsenhausen concentration camp for three weeks, after which he emigrated to the Netherlands.

== Postwar ==
The department store, which was partially destroyed during the war, was rebuilt after 1945. The striking sandstone facade on Neumarkt had to give way to a steel construction, but the north facade on today's Neumarktstrasse was preserved.

The implementation of the Galeria concept of the Kaufhof company took place in 2000. The store closed in January 2024.

== Literature ==
- Max Creutz: Das Warenhaus Tietz in Elberfeld, von Prof. Wilhelm Kreis …. X. Sonderheft der Architektur des XX. Jahrhunderts. Ernst Wasmuth, Berlin 1912. Online
- Hermann J. Mahlberg, Hella Nußbaum: Aufbruch um 1900 und die Moderne in der Architektur des Wuppertals. Abendrot einer Epoche. Müller+Busmann, Wuppertal 2008.
- Michael Okroy: Volksgemeinschaft, Erbkartei und Arisierung. Ein Stadtführer zur NS-Zeit in Wuppertal. Wuppertal 2008².
- Das Warenhaus Tietz in Wuppertal – Tempel des Konsums und Ort der Moderne. Illustr. Broschüre, hrsg. vom Trägerverein Begegnungsstätte Alte Synagoge Wuppertal e.V., Wuppertal 2012

== See also ==
- Aryanization
- The Holocaust
- List of claims for restitution for Nazi-looted art
