= The Rock Pub =

Music Performance Venue

- The Rock Pub's original logo
- Interactive map of The Rock Pub
- Location: 93/26-28 Hollywood Street Building, Phaya Thai Road, Ratchathewi, Bangkok, Thailand
- Coordinates: 13°45′3.91″N 100°31′54.30″E
- Type: Rock pub, Concert venue
- Events: Rock, heavy metal

Construction
- Opened: March 1, 1987

Website
- www.therockpub-bangkok.com

Hollywood Street building

The Rock Pub is a rock-metal pub and music venue at Phaya Thai Road, just below Ratchathewi BTS Station and opposite Asia Hotel in Bangkok, Thailand.

There is live music every night at the Rock Pub.

== History ==
The Rock Pub opened their doors on March 1, 1987, and hundreds of local and international bands have played there since.

Artists from all over the world have also played at the Rock Pub: Sodom, Dragonforce, Doro, Exodus, Mr. Gary Bowden, Napalm Death and King Lychee (Hong Kong) are a selection the bands that have performed at the venue.

The economy shock in 1997 nearly put it out of business, but it stayed strong as the musicians and customers supported and stood by during tough times.

On every March 1 since 1987, rockers from all over Thailand have gathered up and celebrated each year that passed on.

== Notable performers ==
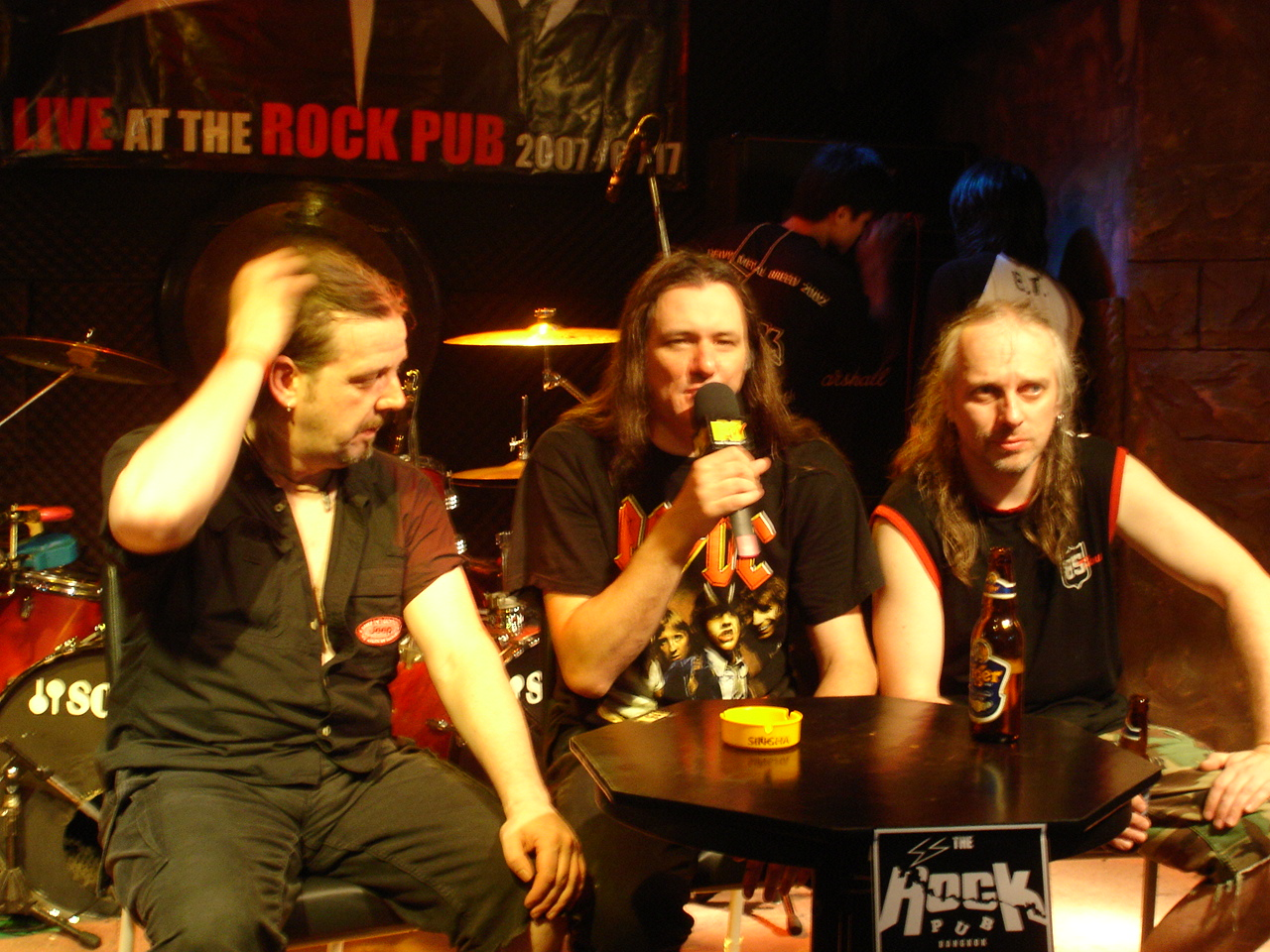
Sodom at The Rock Pub

- The Acacia Strain
- Alesana
- All Shall Perish
- Architects
- A Skylit Drive
- Asking Alexandria
- Atrocity
- Behemoth
- The Black Dahlia Murder
- Caliban
- Carnifex
- The Casualties
- Chiodos
- Chthonic
- Comeback Kid
- Dark Funeral
- Darryl Read
- Decapitated
- Despised Icon
- Destruction
- Didier Wampas
- The Dillinger Escape Plan
- Disgorge
- Doro
- DragonForce
- Dying Fetus
- Emmure
- Enter Shikari
- Every Time I Die
- Exodus
- The Faceless
- The Ghost Inside
- Grave
- The Haunted
- Havok
- Impiety
- Insision
- Iwrestledabearonce
- Leaves' Eyes
- Marduk
- Mayhem
- Napalm Death
- Obscura
- Origin
- Protest The Hero
- Parkway Drive
- Periphery
- Set Your Goals
- Shai Hulud
- Sick of It All
- Silverstein
- Sodom
- Tankard
- Unearth
- Vader
- The Word Alive
- Warbringer
