= Ban Khrua =

Neighbourhood of Bangkok, Thailand

Coordinates: 13°44′58.89″N 100°31′39.28″E

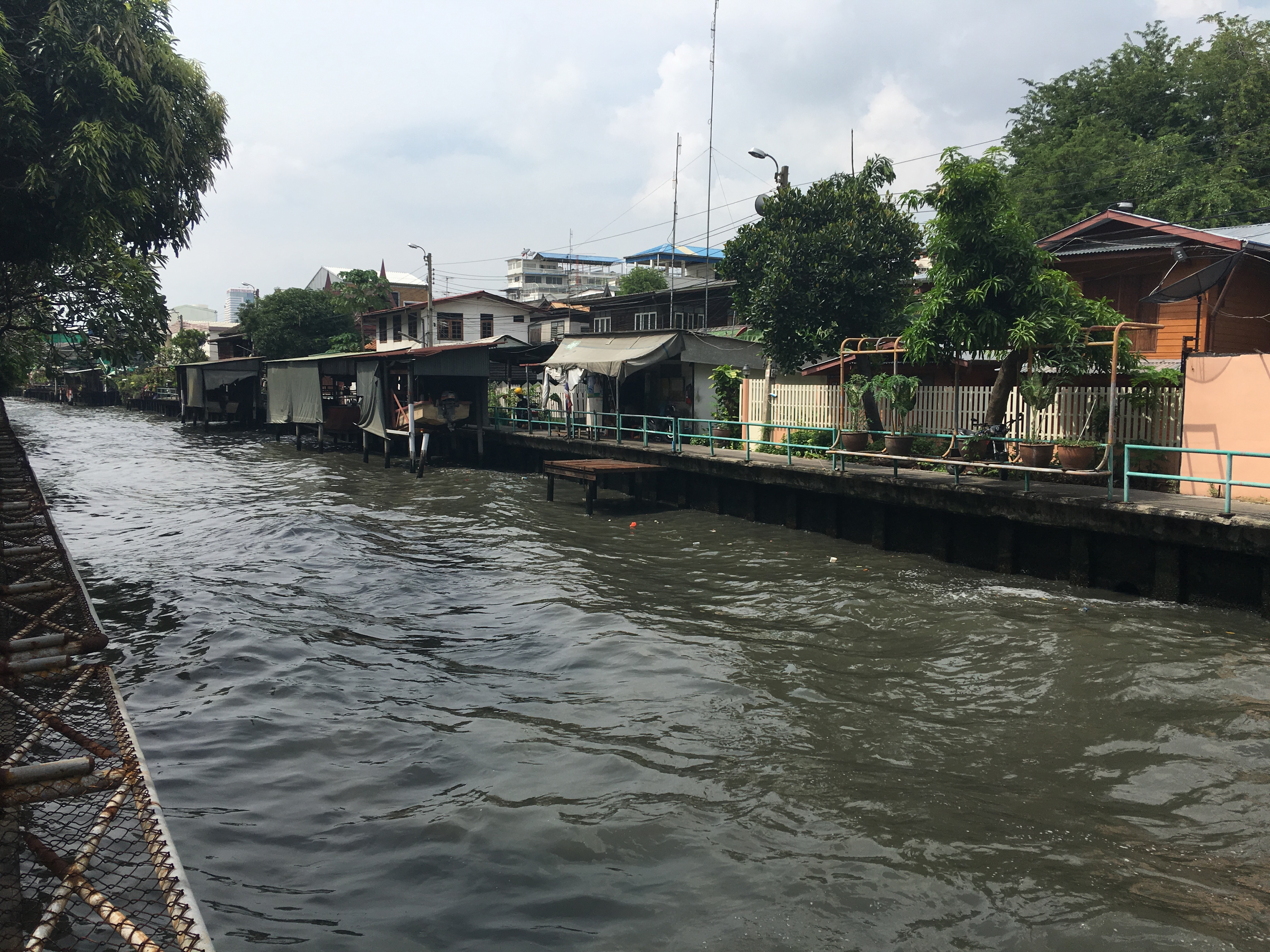
The Ban Khrua Nuea neighbourhood (along the Khlong Saen Saep)

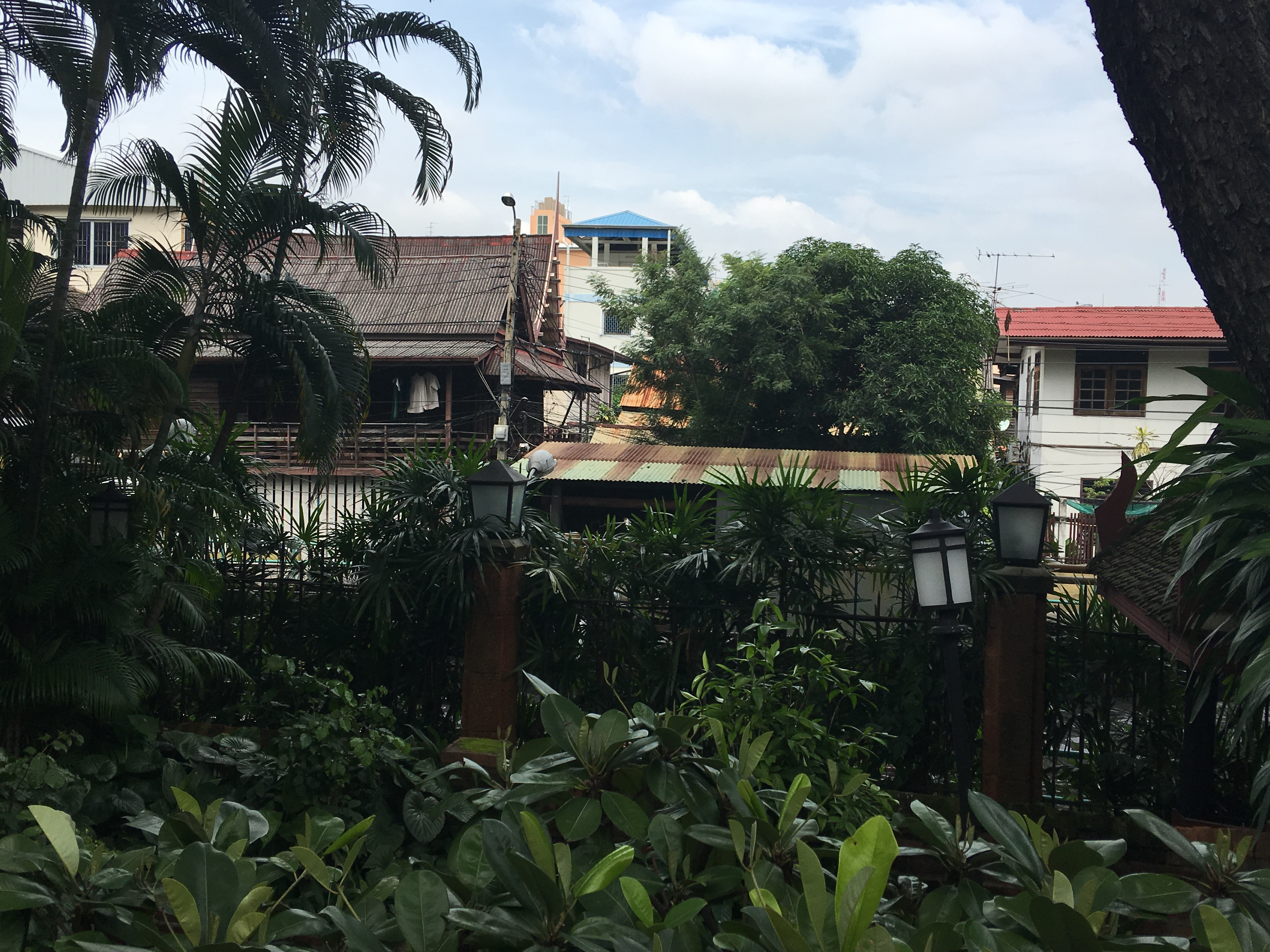
Ban Khrua Nuea

Ban Khrua (Thai: บ้านครัว, pronounced [bâːn kʰrūa̯]; other spellings include Ban Krua and Baan Krua) is a historic community neighborhood along Bangkok's Khlong Saen Saep from Saphan Hua Chang to Wat Phrayayang. It includes an area of about 14 rai (about 5.5 acres) on both banks of the canal. It's divided into three parts: Ban Khrua Nuea (บ้านครัวเหนือ; 'North Ban Khrua'); Ban Khrua Tai (บ้านครัวใต้; 'South Ban Khrua') in Ratchathewi District; and Ban Khrua Tawan Tok (บ้านครัวตะวันตก; 'West Ban Khrua') in Pathum Wan District. The main artery is Ban Khrua Nuea in Soi Kasem San 3, Rama I Road, the boundary between Ratchathewi and Pathum Wan Districts.

== History ==
The community dates back to the reign of King Rama I, who granted the land to Islamic Cham troops after they had fought with the Siamese Army in the Songkhram Kao Thap, the Burmese–Siamese War in 1785–1786, the last major battle fought against Burmese invaders. The Cham had migrated from the Champa realm (currently in central and southern Vietnam) during the Ayutthaya Kingdom. Ban Khrua is the oldest Islamic community in Bangkok.

Khlong Saen Saep was dug during the reign of King Rama III as the main supply route for troops fighting in what is now Cambodia and part of southern Vietnam in the 14 year-long Siamese-Vietnamese wars. It runs from Bangkok to the Bang Pakong River in eastern Chachoengsao Province.

Years ago, silk fabric was a well-known product of the community and a major source of income for most households. The community served as a factory for the American businessman Jim Thompson whose home, now a museum called the Jim Thompson House, is nearby on the south bank of the canal. Thai silk became highly prized, and was used as for costuming in the Broadway musical The King and I in 1951 and Hollywood film Ben-Hur in 1959. Ban Khrua became a centre of the silk industry in Thailand.

The Disappearance of Jim Thompson in 1967 marked the peak of silk production in Ban Khrua.

Three mosques remain in the community. Silk production continues in a few workshops, where traditional production methods survive. Adding to the cost of progress, Ban Khrua residents have been at odds with the government for more than 25 years as they fight to keep their community from being razed for a proposed tollway.

== Of note nearby ==
- Chaloem La 56 Bridge or Saphan Hua Chang (Elephant's Head Bridge)
- Siam Square
- Sa Pathum Palace
- Ratchaprasong Shopping Center
- Erawan Shrine
- Pratunam Market

== See also ==
- Thai silk
- History of Bangkok
- Islam in Thailand
- Siamese-Vietnamese War (1831–1834)
- Siamese–Vietnamese War (1841–1845)
