= Ratchathewi Intersection =

Coordinates: 13°45′11.68″N 100°31′54.41″E

Ratchathewi
- ราชเทวี
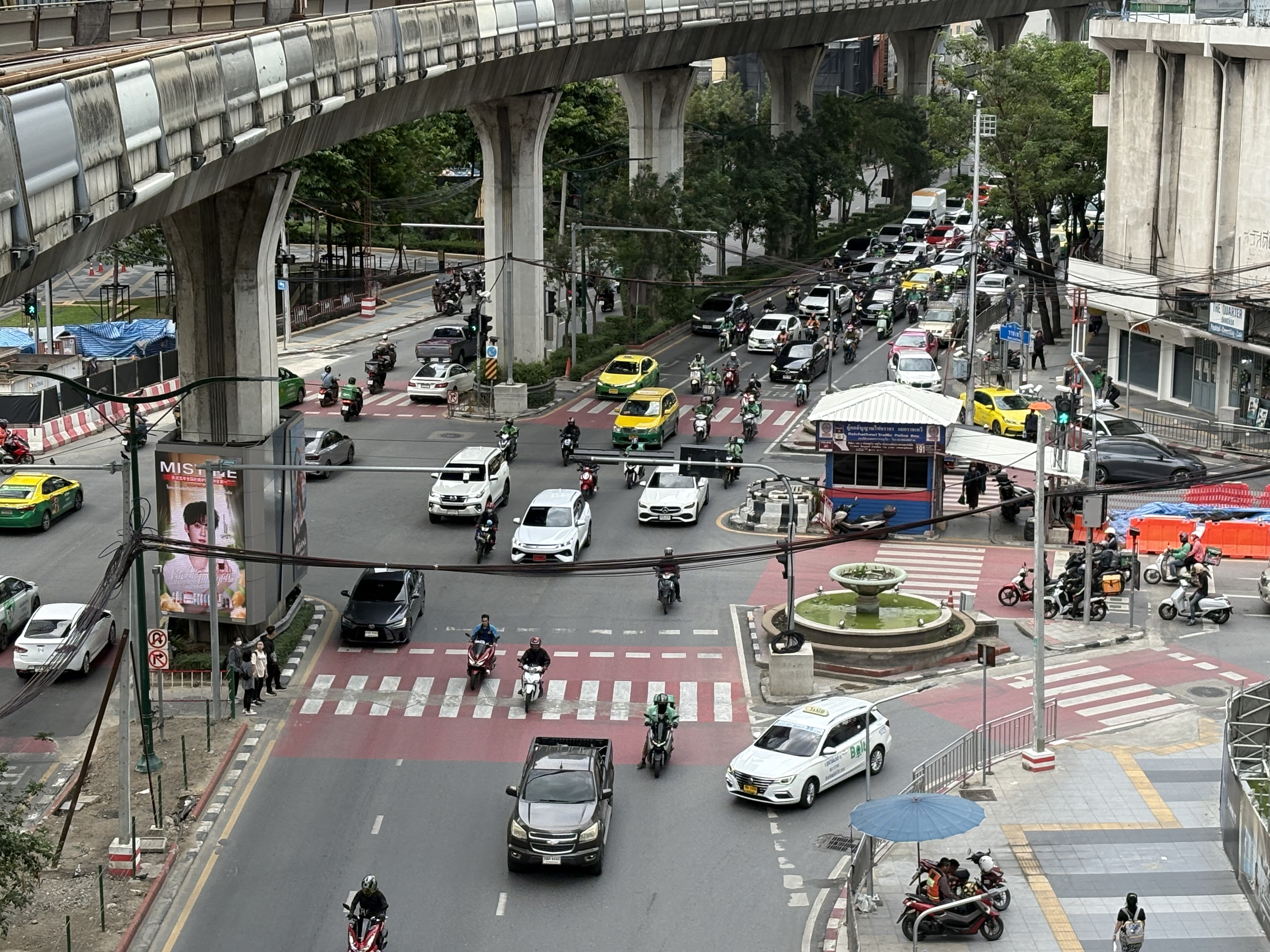
- Interactive map of Ratchathewi

Location
- Thung Phaya Thai, Thanon Phaya Thai, Thanon Phetchaburi, Ratchathewi, Bangkok, Thailand
- Roads at junction: Phaya Thai (north–south); Phetchaburi (east–west)

Construction
- Type: Four-way at-grade intersection with overbridge and BTS tracks

Ratchathewi Intersection (Thai: แยกราชเทวี, RTGS: Yaek Ratchathewi, pronounced [jɛ̂ːk râːt.tʰēː.wiː]) is a four-way intersection of Phaya Thai and Phetchaburi Roads in the area where the sub-districts of Thung Phaya Thai, Thanon Phaya Thai and Thanon Phetchaburi meet, within Ratchathewi District, central Bangkok. It is the location of Ratchathewi station and lies close to other major junctions including Pratunam, Pathum Wan, Phaya Thai, Uruphong and Victory Monument.

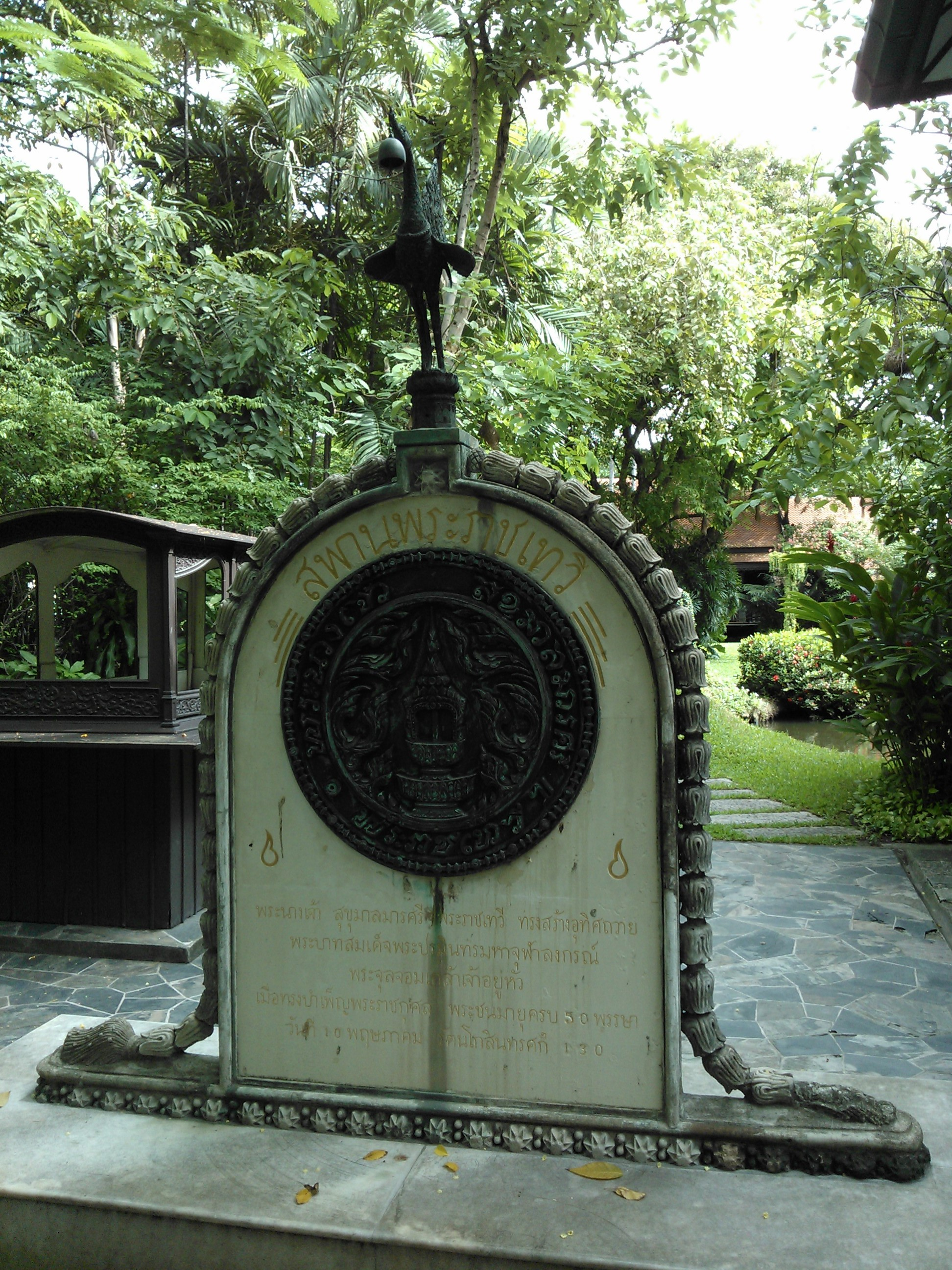
The present evidence of the Ratchathewi Bridge is a metal signboard which used to be placed in the middle of the bridge now kept at nearby Suan Pakkad Palace

Its name means Royal Consort in honour of Sukhumala Marasri, one of the four consorts of King Chulalongkorn (Rama V). At the age of 50, she personally funded the construction of a bridge across the canal Khlong Pra Chae Chin. King Vajiravudh (Rama VI) presided over the opening ceremony on 22 May 1911, officially naming it "Phra Ratchathewi Bridge", though it was more commonly known simply as "Ratchathewi Bridge". Later, when Phetchaburi Road required widening, the bridge and canal were demolished to create a roundabout. The Ratchathewi Roundabout featured a large fountain surrounded by rose bushes, with spotlights illuminating it at night, making it a celebrated landmark. At the time, the neighbourhood was regarded as lively and fashionable, home to the residences of wealthy merchants and members of the nobility.

In 1964, the roundabout was removed to relieve traffic congestion, and the fountain was replaced with four smaller fountains, one at each corner of the intersection. During the 1970s, Ratchathewi became one of Bangkok's most popular shopping areas, hosting leading cinemas such as Athens, Mackenna, Hollywood, President, Paramount, Metro and Indra, along with numerous beauty salons.

In 1975, a flyover was constructed across the intersection, completed in 1979 after a strength test involving dozens of trucks loaded with crushed rock. It was considered the first flyover of its kind in Bangkok. In January 2025, it was demolished to make way for the construction of the MRT Orange Line.

When Bangkok was rezoned in 1989, Ratchathewi was separated from Phaya Thai District, with "Ratchathewi" adopted as the name of the new district.

== See also ==
- Ratchathewi District
- Ratchathewi station
- Phaya Thai Road
- Phetchaburi Road
- Pratunam
- Pathum Wan Intersection
- Uruphong
- Victory Monument (Thailand)
- MRT Orange Line
