= Thanon Phetchaburi =

Thanon Phetchaburi ถนนเพชรบุรี
- Khwaeng
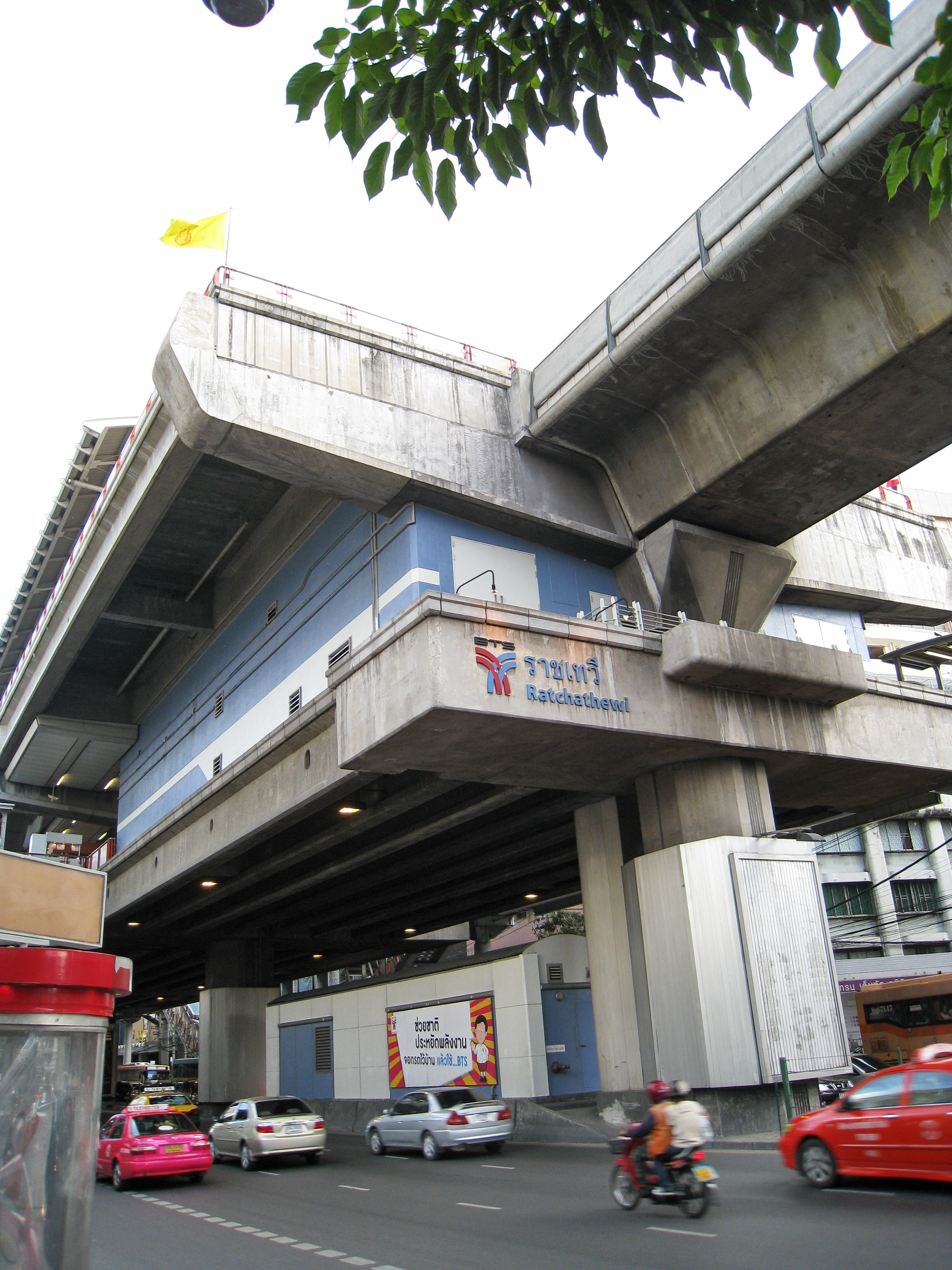
- Ratchathewi Station

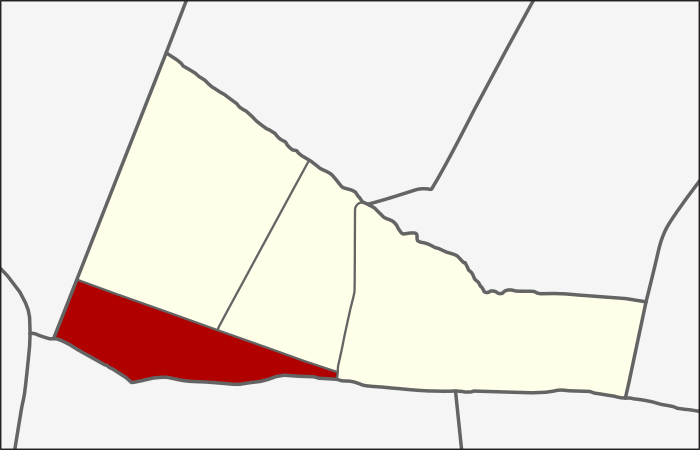
- Location in Ratchathewi District
- Country: Thailand
- Province: Bangkok
- Khet: Ratchathewi

Area
  - Total: 1.148 km^{2} (0.443 sq mi)

Population (2023)
  - Total: 13,762
- Time zone: UTC+7 (ICT)
- Postal code: 10400
- TIS 1099: 103703

Thanon Phaya Thai (Thai: ถนนเพชรบุรี, pronounced [tʰa.nǒn pʰèt.t͡ɕʰa.bù.rīː]) is a khwaeng (subdistrict) of Ratchathewi District, Bangkok. In 2023, it had a population of 13,762 people.
