= Phaya Thai Road =

Major road in Bangkok, Thailand

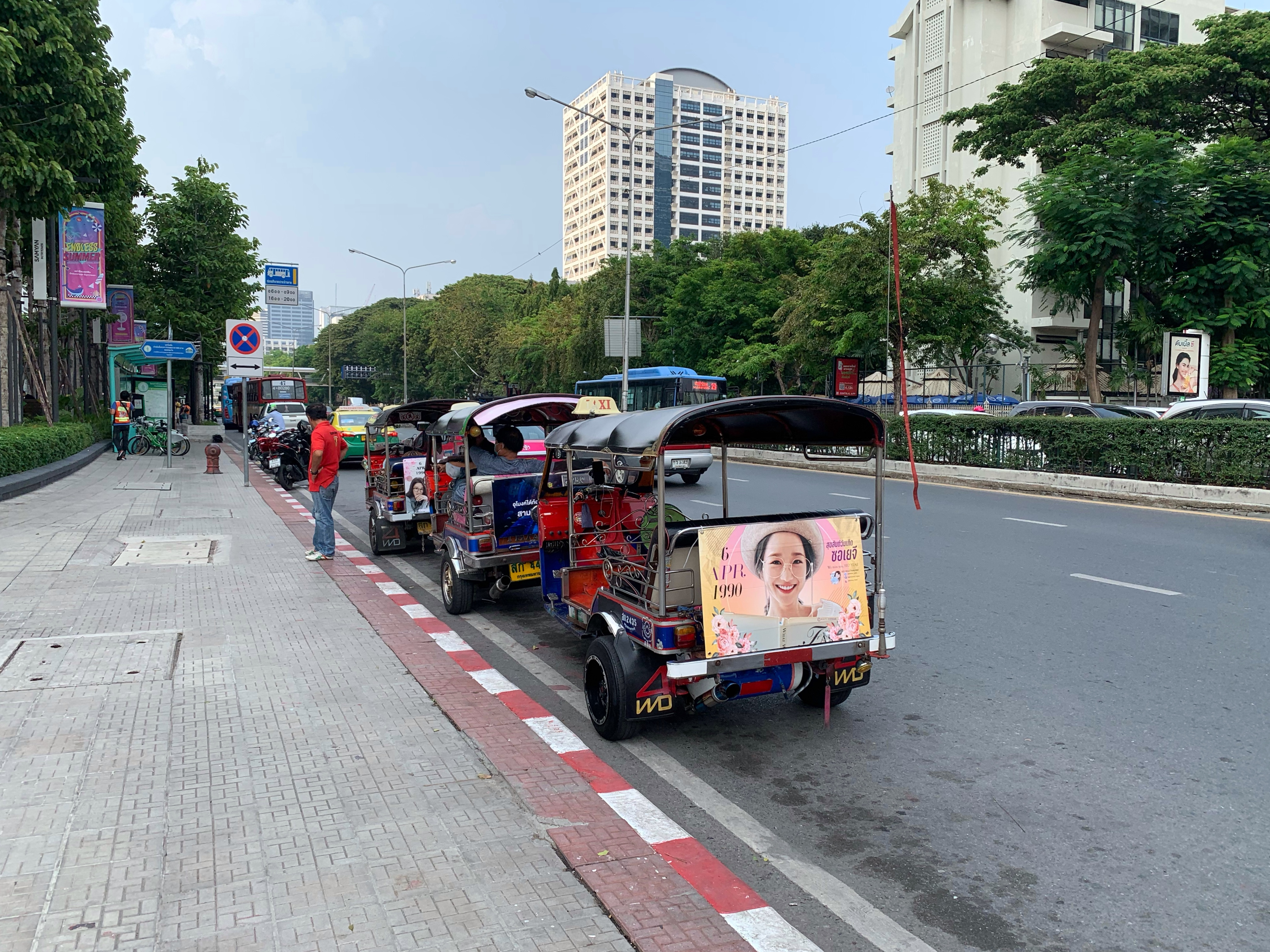
Tuk-tuks on Phaya Thai Road in front of Samyan Mitrtown near the Hua Lamphong Intersection end, looking northwards

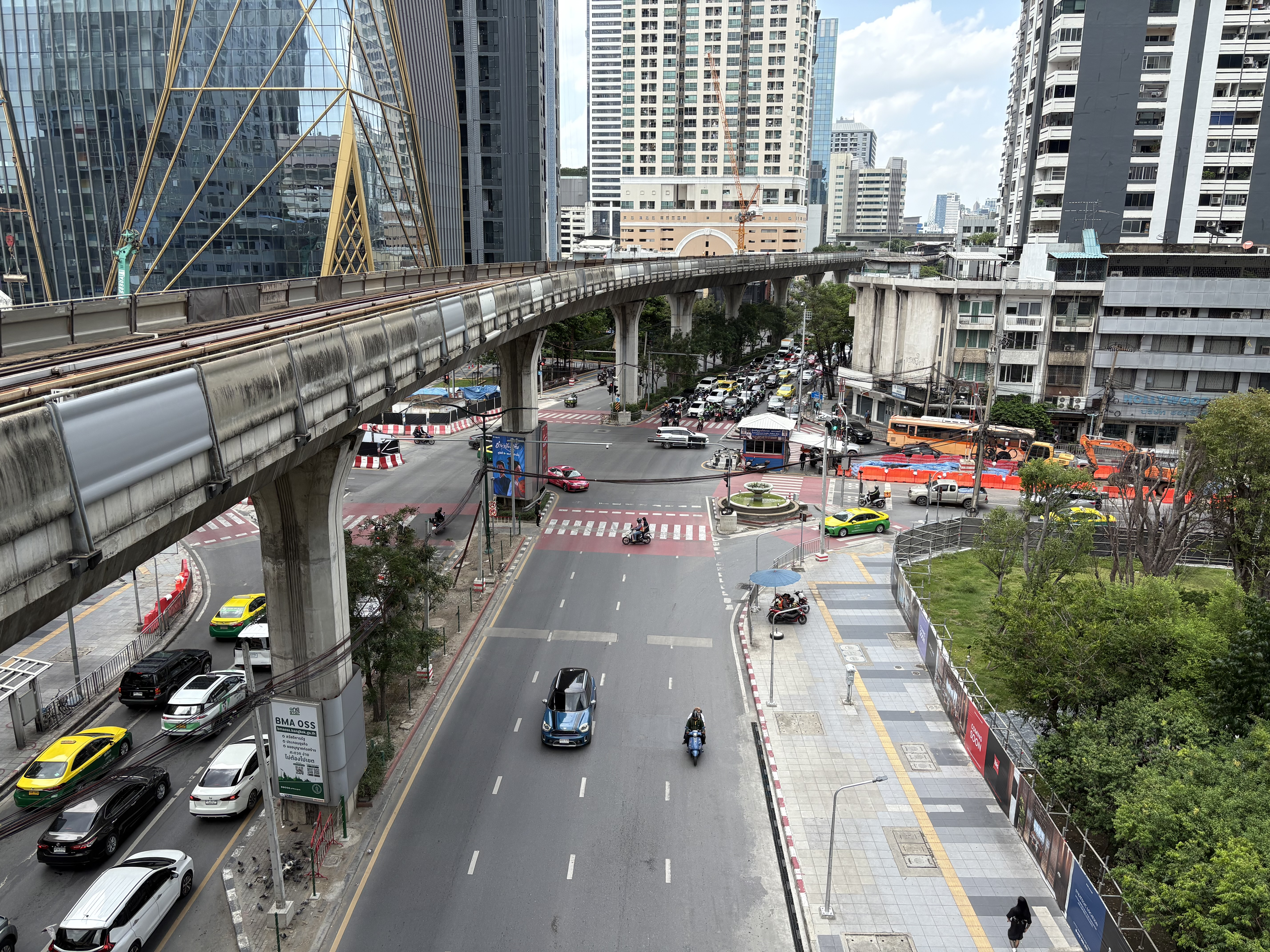
Phaya Thai Road at the Ratchathewi Intersection, as seen from Ratchathewi Station

Phaya Thai Road (Thai: ถนนพญาไท, RTGS: Thanon Phaya Thai, pronounced [tʰā.nǒn pʰā.jāː tʰāj]) is a major road in Bangkok, Thailand. It begins at the south side of Victory Monument in Ratchathewi District and continues until Sam Yan Intersection in Pathum Wan District, where it intersects with Rama IV Road.

Between Victory Monument and Rama I Road, Phaya Thai Road runs directly below the Sukhumvit Line of the BTS Skytrain. Phaya Thai is also the name of a stop on this line, just past the intersection of Phaya Thai Road and Si Ayutthaya Road.

Phaya Thai District is named after this road. Since its creation in 1966, however, the district has been subdivided several times, so that now Phaya Thai Road is no longer within Phaya Thai District.

Phayathai Road is a significant thoroughfare in Bangkok, linking nine key intersections, including Samyan, Phatumwan, and the renowned Chalerm La 56 Bridge, also known as Elephant Tower Bridge. Along its route are notable landmarks such as Chulalongkorn University, Triam Udom Suksa School, and the Bangkok Art and Culture Centre.

== Key landmarks ==
Phayathai road intersect with 18 important locations

1. Chulalongkorn University Chulalongkorn University (Thai: จุฬาลงกรณ์มหาวิทยาลัย) is an institution in Bangkok, Thailand, renowned for academic excellence and societal impact since 1917.
2. Triam Udom Suksa School (Thai: โรงเรียนเตรียมอุดมศึกษา) is a public secondary school in Bangkok, Thailand, established in 1940.
3. Rajamangala University of Technology Tawan-Ok Campus (Thai: มหาวิทยาลัยเทคโนโลยีราชมงคลตะวันออก วิทยาเขตอุเทนถวาย), located in Udon Thani (Thai: อุดรธานี, pronunciation: [ʔū.dɔ̄ːn tʰāː.nīː]), is a branch of Rajamangala University of Technology (RMUTT) situated in the northeastern region of Thailand. It offers a variety of academic programs focusing on technology, engineering, and related fields.
4. Bangkok Art and Culture Centre (Thai: หอศิลปวัฒนธรรมแห่งกรุงเทพมหานคร) is an art museum and cultural center situated in the heart of Bangkok, Thailand. Opened in 2008, BACC serves as a platform for promoting and showcasing various forms of art, including visual arts, performing arts, design, and multimedia installations.
5. Sa Pathum Palace (Thai: วังสระปทุม) has served as a residence of the Thai Royal Family, particularly the House of Mahidol, since the 1800s. Notably, it is designated as the official abode of Princess Sirindhorn (Thai: เจ้าฟ้าสิรินธร, pronunciation: [tɕâo fáː sì.rín.tʰɔ̄ːn]).
6. Anti-Money Laundering Office (Thai: สำนักงานป้องกันและปราบปรามการฟอกเงิน), a government agency under the jurisdiction of the Ministry of Justice. It has the authority to establish standards and ensure compliance with laws related to anti-money laundering, as well as to serve as a financial intelligence analysis unit related to money laundering.
7. Chaloem La 56 Bridge (Hua Chang Bridge) (Thai: สะพานเฉลิมหล้า 56 (สะพานหัวช้าง)), known as Hua Chang Bridge. The bridge crosses Khlong Saen Saep (Saen Saep canal) on Phaya Thai Road.
8. BTS Ratchathewi Station (Thai: สถานีรถไฟฟ้าบีทีเอส ราชเทวี), a station on the Sukhumvit Line of the BTS Skytrain, situated in the Ratchathewi District of Bangkok, Thailand.
9. National Economic and Social Advisory Council (Phaya Thai Plaza Building) (Thai: สภาที่ปรึกษาเศรษฐกิจและสังคมแห่งชาติ (อาคารพญาไท พลาซ่า)) was a governmental agency in the past of the Thai government. It was responsible for providing advice to the Cabinet on both economic and social matters.
10. Department of Livestock Development (Thai: กรมปศุสัตว์) is a Thai government agency categorized as a department under the Ministry of Agriculture and Cooperatives. Its responsibilities encompass overseeing and regulating animal husbandry.
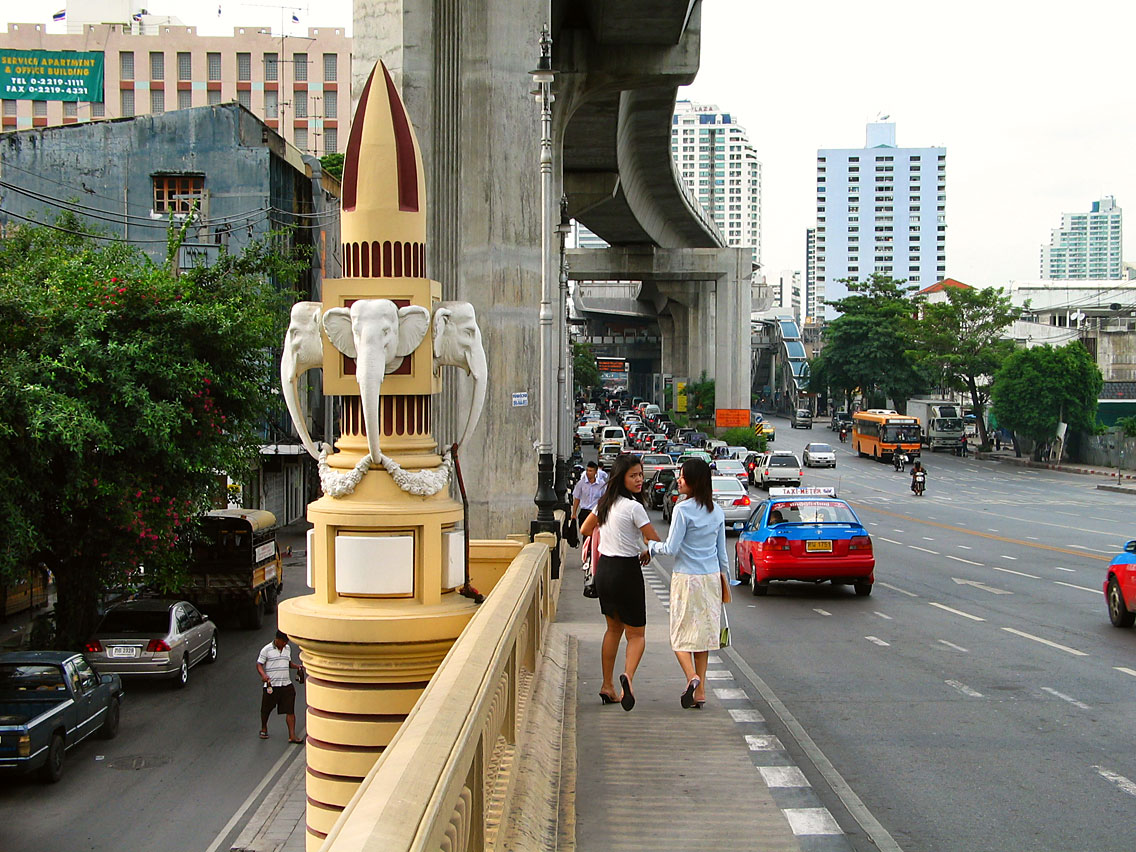
11. Hua Chang Bridge
  BTS and Airport Rail Link Phaya Thai Station (Thai: สถานีรถไฟฟ้าบีทีเอสและสถานีรถไฟฟ้าเชื่อมท่าอากาศยานสุวรรณภูมิ พญาไท) is a transportation hub located in the Ratchathewi District of Bangkok, Thailand. It serves as a station on the Airport Rail Link, BTS Sukhumvit Line (Thai: สายสุขุมวิท บีทีเอส, pronunciation: [sǎːj sù.kʰūm.wít bīː.tîː.ʔèt]), and a railway halt on the Eastern Line.
12. Wannasorn Building (Thai: อาคารวรรณสรณ์) was an educational center comprising schools, food courts, bookstores, and dental and beauty centers.
13. Ratchathewi District Office (Thai: สำนักงานเขตราชเทวี) is an office that provides consultation on governance and handles registration within the Ratchathewi district.
14. Royal Thai Army Medicine Department (Thai: กรมแพทย์ทหารบก) is a Thai organization dedicated to researching, training, and educating medical personnel, specifically for the Thai army forces. Additionally, it provides healthcare services to soldiers, their families, and civilians through 37 affiliated army hospitals.
15. BTS Victory Monument Station (Thai: สถานีรถไฟฟ้าบีทีเอส อนุสาวรีย์ชัยสมรภูมิ) is a BTS Skytrain station located on Phaya Thai Road, south of the Victory Monument.
16. Boromarajonani College of Nursing (Thai: วิทยาลัยพยาบาลบรมราชชนนี กรุงเทพ), located in Bangkok, is the first nursing education institution under the Ministry of Public Health and the third oldest nursing education institution in the country.
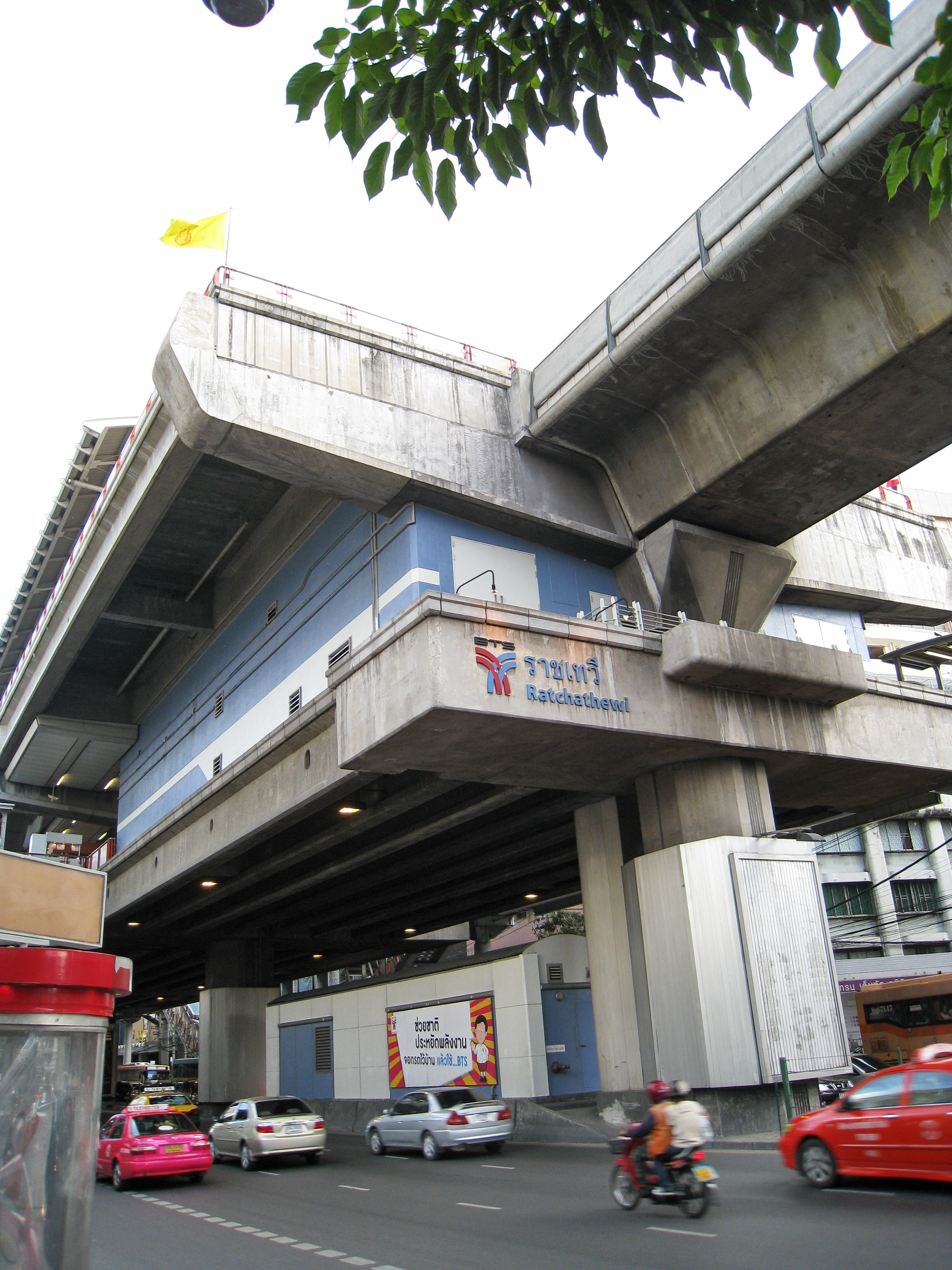
17. BTS Ratchathewi
  Rajavithi Hospital and Rangsit University Medical College (Thai: โรงพยาบาลราชวิถีและวิทยาลัยแพทยศาสตร์ มหาวิทยาลัยรังสิต) is a hospital that provides a private medical school and is the ninth oldest medical school in Thailand.
18. Victory Monument (Thai: อนุสาวรีย์ชัยสมรภูมิ) is a monument erected in June 1941 to celebrate Thailand's success in the Franco-Thai War. Located in the Ratchathewi District, northeast of central Bangkok, it stands at the heart of a traffic circle where Phahonyothin (Thai: พหลโยธิน, pronunciation: [pʰā.hǒn.jō.tʰīn]), Phaya Thai, and Ratchawithi roads intersect.
19. Samyan Mitrtown, a mixed-use shopping, office, residential and leisure development.
20. MBK Center, a large shopping mall.
21. Siam Square, a shopping and entertainment area in the Siam area.

== Economy and commerce ==
The Phaya Thai area holds significance, ranking 9th in land prices in Bangkok. According to Mr. Sopon Pornchokchai (Thai: โสภณ พรชัย, pronunciation: [sò.pʰon pɔ̄ːn tɕʰôk.tɕʰāj]), it was valued at 1,850,000 Baht per square wah in 2567.

Near Phaya Thai Road, Siam Discovery and King Power offer diverse shopping experiences, contributing to the area's vibrant atmosphere and appeal.

== History of Phaya Thai Road ==
The history of Phaya Thai Road is a narrative of urban evolution and cultural significance, mirroring the broader changes in Bangkok and Thailand at large. Established in the early 20th century, the road has witnessed and facilitated significant transformations in the city's fabric, both physically and socio-culturally.

- Early Development

Phaya Thai Road was initially developed as part of a modernization effort in Bangkok, aimed at improving the city's infrastructure to support its growing population and economic ambitions. In the late 19th and early 20th centuries, as Thailand (then Siam) navigated the pressures of colonial interests in Southeast Asia, the monarchy and government undertook significant projects to modernize the country. The construction of Phaya Thai Road was one such project, envisioned to enhance connectivity within the city and with other regions.

- Mid-20th Century Changes

Throughout the mid-20th century, Phaya Thai Road transformed from a residential avenue into a bustling urban artery. This period saw the construction of significant landmarks, and the road's role in the city's transportation network expanded with the development of public transport routes. The Victory Monument, established in 1941 to commemorate Thai military victories, became a prominent landmark at the northern end of Phaya Thai Road.

- Recent Developments

In recent decades, Phaya Thai Road has continued to evolve, reflecting the rapid urbanization of Bangkok. The road has seen the development of modern commercial buildings, shopping centers, and cultural institutions. It has also become a key segment of the city's mass transit system, with the introduction of the BTS Skytrain routes and stations along the road enhancing its accessibility and importance in daily urban life.

The transformation of Phaya Thai Road from a simple residential street to a central urban artery is emblematic of Bangkok's transition into a modern metropolis.

On January 23, 2022, an accident occurred where a young policeman riding a motorcycle collided with a female doctor who was crossing the road on a pedestrian crossing, killing the doctor. The incident happened in front of the Chulabhorn (Thai: จุฬาภรณ์, pronunciation: [tɕù.lā.pʰɔ̄ːn]) Research Institute on Phaya Thai Road. The authorities have since installed traffic lights at this crossing that pedestrians who wish to cross the road can now use to stop traffic.

On February 27, 2024, more than 1,500 people, including alumni, current students, the Alumni Association of Udon Thani (Thai: อุดรธานี, pronunciation: [ʔū.dɔ̄ːn tʰāː.nīː]), the Parents' Association, and teachers, gathered at the Eastern Campus of Rajamangala University of Technology Tawan-Ok (Thai: วิทยาเขตตะวันออกของมหาวิทยาลัยเทคโนโลยีราชมงคลตะวันออก, pronunciation: [wít.tʰá.jā.kʰèːt tà.wǎn ʔɔ̀ːk kʰɔ̌ːŋ mā.hǎː wít.tʰá.jā.láj têk.no.lo.jīː râːt.tɕʰā.mōŋ.kʰōn tà.wǎn ʔɔ̀ːk]). They walked together from the campus to the Property Management Office of Chulalongkorn University to oppose the relocation of the Udon Thani campus. The march route went through the Udon Thani campus area, along Phaya Thai Road to Samyan Intersection, and ended at the Ministry of Higher Education, Science, Research and Innovation (MHESI) via Chalerm La 56 Bridge (Elephant Tower Bridge) and Yothi Road(Thai: ถนนโยธี, pronunciation: [tʰà.nǒn jô.tʰīː]).

== Geography ==
Phaya Thai Road is a significant route in Bangkok, running from Victory Monument to Rama IV Road. It is vital for city transport, connecting districts like Ratchathewi (Thai: ราชเทวี, pronunciation: [râːt.tɕʰā.tʰēː.wīː]) and Pathum Wan (Thai: ปทุมวัน, pronunciation: [pā.tʰūm wān]). Over time, it is transformed from a residential area to a bustling urban space, mixing Bangkok's old charm with modern development.

The road's sides are lined with a mix of traditional shop houses, modern buildings, and cultural sites, creating a dynamic environment. It's known for its local markets and street food, adding to the area's vibrancy. Accessibility is boosted by the BTS Skytrain running directly above parts of the road.

The area caters to a wide audience with various accommodation options and is a culinary destination with its diverse food offerings. While Phaya Thai Road may not be the top nightlife destination in Bangkok, it offers enough to entertain with bars and live music spots. Its strategic location makes it a convenient base for exploring the city.

In essence, Phaya Thai Road mirrors Bangkok's evolution, balancing historical elements with modern living, making it a unique part of the city's fabric.

== Urban development ==
UHG is investing 3.1 billion Baht in new hotel developments in Ramkhamhaeng (Thai: รามคำแหง, pronunciation: [rāːm kʰām hɛ̄ːŋ]) and Phaya Thai, aiming to leverage the Orange Line's completion and the area's luxury development surge. This move includes a 600 million Baht investment for a mid-tier, 200-room hotel on Phaya Thai Road, enhancing the local hospitality scene and offering mixed-use spaces. This reflects significant urban development and economic growth in Bangkok.
