= Chaloem La 56 Bridge =

Chaloem La 56 Bridge สะพานเฉลิมหล้า ๕๖
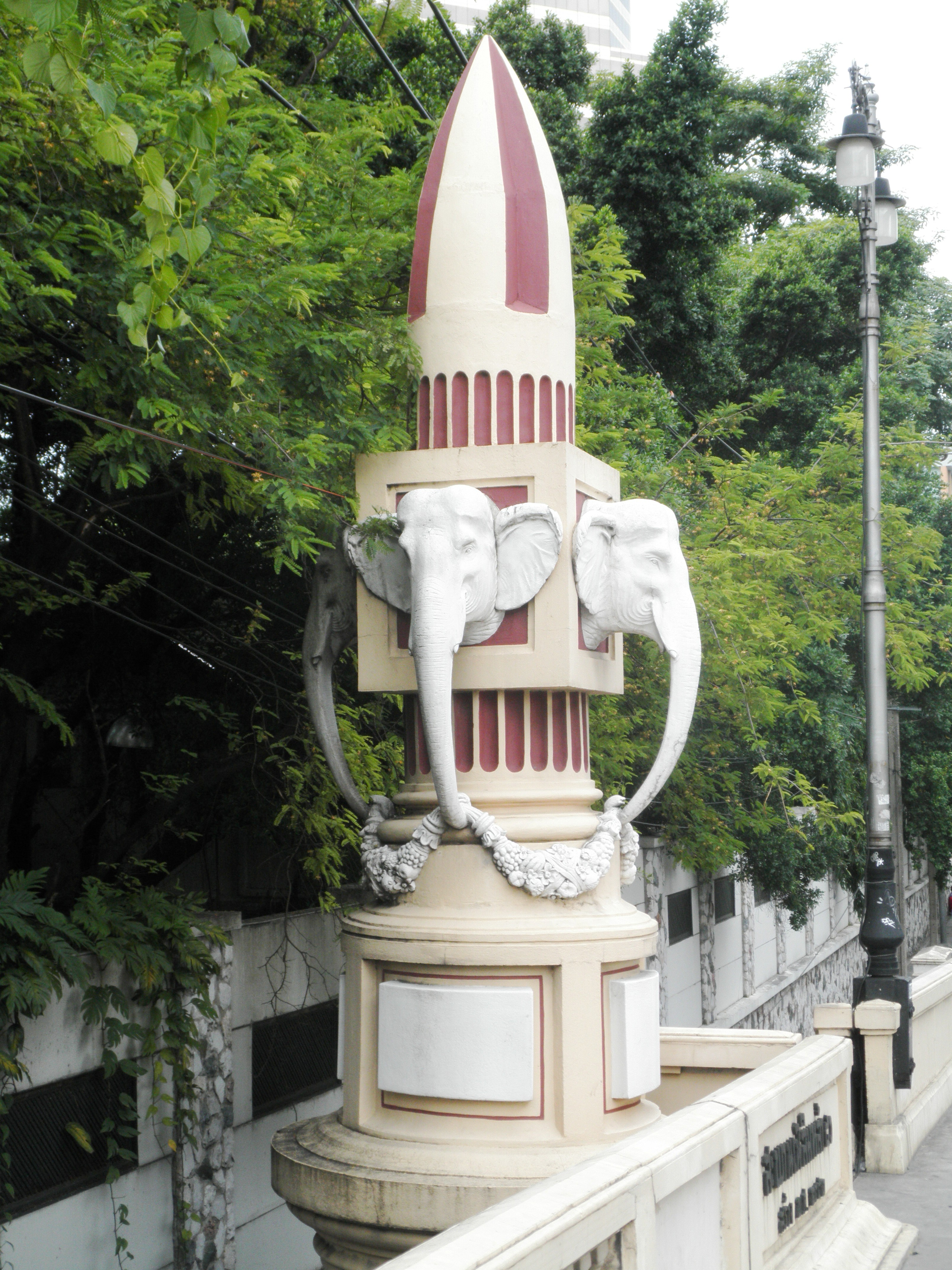
- Chaloem La 56 Bridge Today
- Coordinates: 13°44′57″N 100°31′52″E
- Carries: Phaya Thai Road
- Crosses: Khlong Saen Saep
- Locale: Thanon Phetchaburi Sub-district, Ratchathewi District and Wang Mai Sub-district, Pathum Wan District
- Official name: Chaloem La 56 Bridge
- Other name(s): Saphan Hua Chang (Elephant's Head Bridge)
- Maintained by: Bangkok Metropolitan Administration (BMA)

History
- Opened: November 15, 1909

Chaloem La 56 Bridge (Thai: สะพานเฉลิมหล้า 56), popularly known as Hua Chang Bridge (สะพานหัวช้าง, lit. 'elephant's head bridge'), is a bridge in Bangkok's Thanon Phetchaburi sub-district, Ratchathewi district and Wang Mai sub-district, Pathum Wan district. The bridge crosses Khlong Saen Saep on Phaya Thai Road.

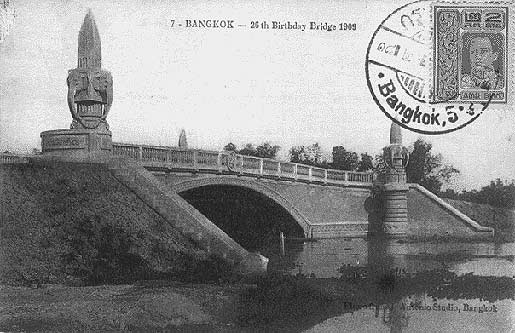
Chaloem La 56 Bridge on a postcard from 1909

Chaloem La 56 Bridge is one of the three remaining bridges of the Chaloem bridge series. The other two are Chaloem Phan 53 Bridge in Bang Rak and Sathon districts, with Chaloem Lok 55 Bridge nearby. On March 18, 1975 it was registered as one of the ancient monuments of Bangkok.
