= Thanon Phaya Thai =

Thanon Phaya Thai ถนนพญาไท
- Khwaeng
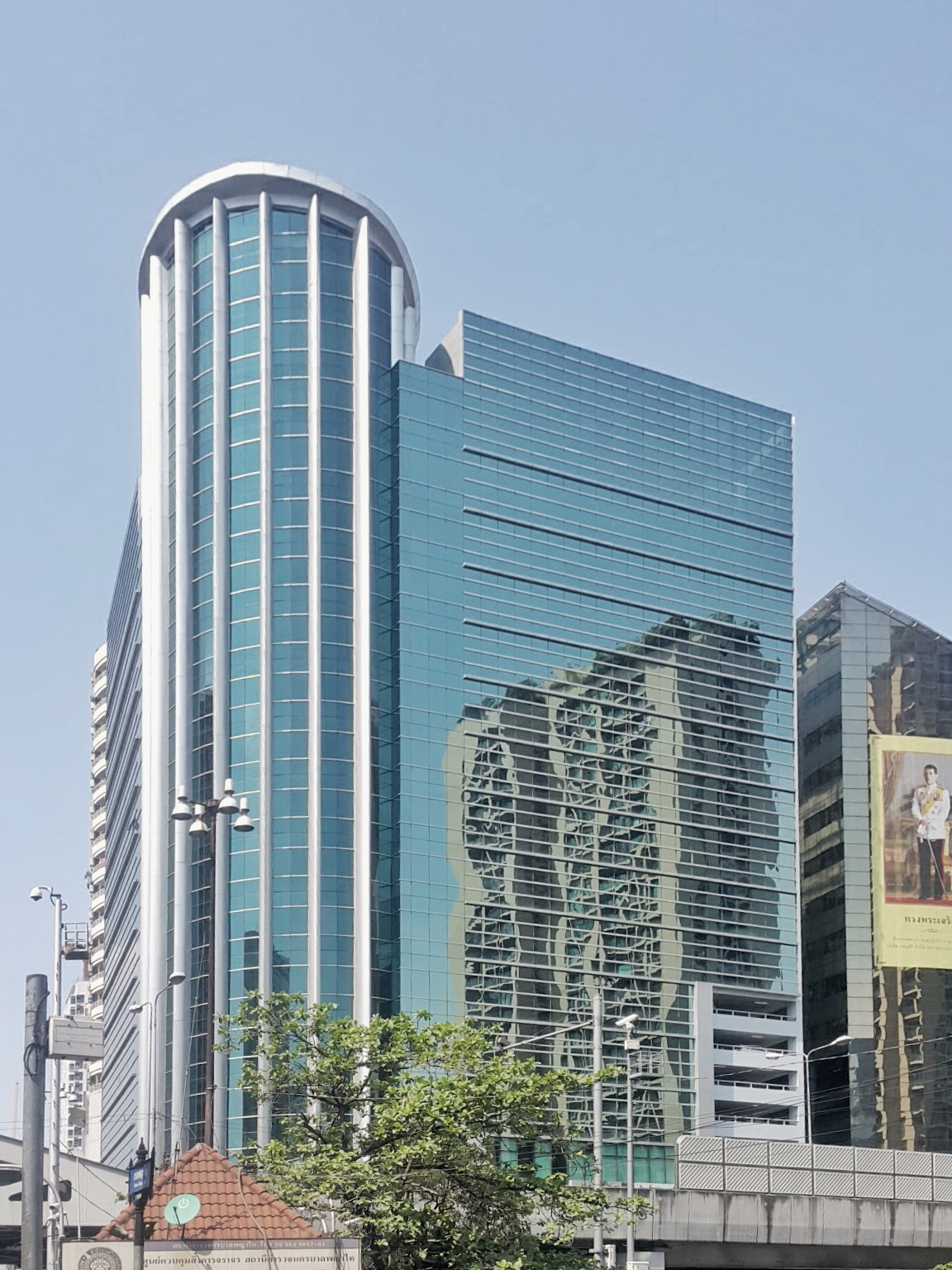
- Wannasorn Building

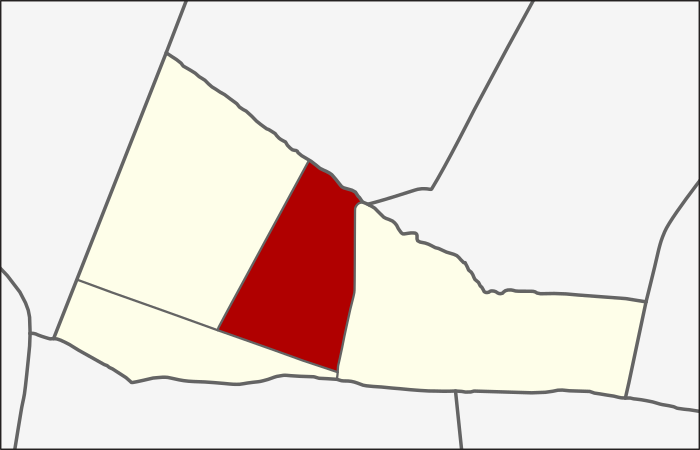
- Location in Ratchathewi District
- Country: Thailand
- Province: Bangkok
- Khet: Ratchathewi

Area
  - Total: 1.136 km^{2} (0.439 sq mi)

Population (2023)
  - Total: 9,798
- Time zone: UTC+7 (ICT)
- Postal code: 10400
- TIS 1099: 103702

Thanon Phaya Thai (Thai: ถนนพญาไท, pronounced [tʰa.nǒn pʰājāː tʰaj]) is a khwaeng (subdistrict) of Ratchathewi District, Bangkok. In 2023, it had a population of 9,798 people.
