= Faculty of Tropical Medicine, Mahidol University =

Government organization in Thailand

- คณะเวชศาสตร์เขตร้อน มหาวิทยาลัยมหิดล
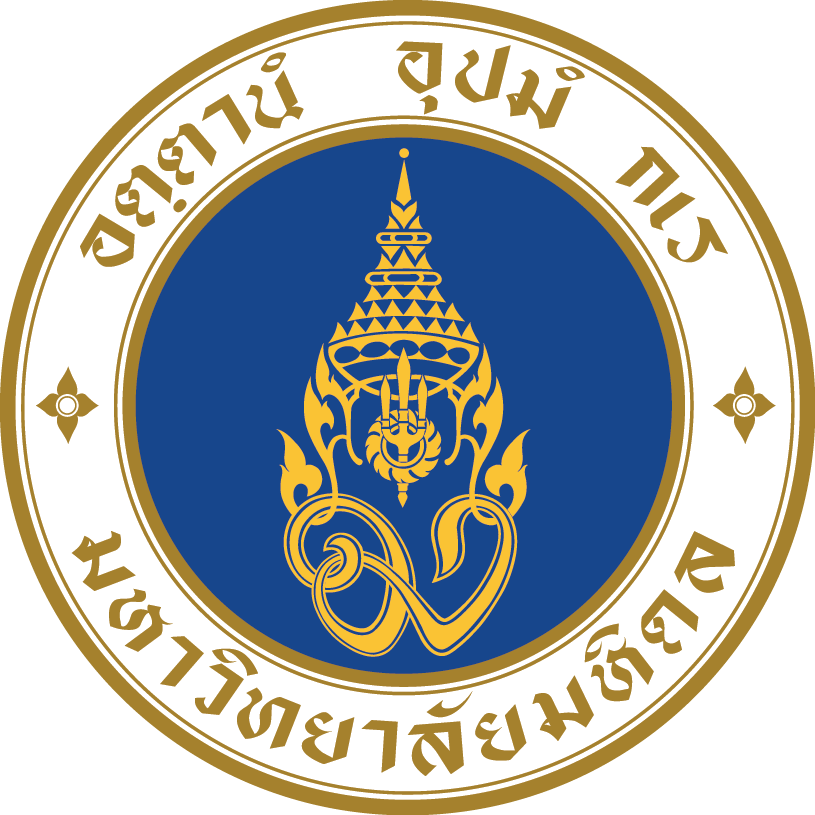
- Type: Public university
- Established: 6 April 1960
- Parent institution: Mahidol University
- Dean: Assoc. Prof. Weerapong Phumratanaprapin, M.D.
- Location: 420/6 Ratchawithi Road, Thung Phayathai Subdistrict, Ratchathewi, Bangkok 10400, Thailand
- Website: www.tm.mahidol.ac.th/eng/index-eng.php

The Faculty of Tropical Medicine, Mahidol University (Thai: คณะเวชศาสตร์เขตร้อน มหาวิทยาลัยมหิดล) is the only faculty specialising in tropical medicine in Thailand. It operates the Mahidol Bangkok School of Tropical Medicine (Mahidol-BSTM) as the main teaching facility and the Hospital for Tropical Diseases for patient treatment.

== History ==
The Faculty of Tropical Medicine was first proposed by Prof. Chamlong Harinasuta, M.D. and Prof. Khunying Tranakchit Harinasuta, M.D. as there as no school in Thailand that taught tropical medicine specifically and students wishing to study in the field had to go to foreign institutions in the United Kingdom. Furthermore, Thailand is a country located in the tropics and so there were many patients in need of treatment in this particular field. This was well supported by many influential figures at the time including Prof. Sawat Daengsawang, M.D., the dean of the University of Medical Sciences, Brian Gilmore Maegraith, the dean of the Liverpool School of Tropical Medicine, Dr Kamhaeng Palangkul, the Secretariat of the Office of the Education Council and Gen. Sarit Thanarat, Prime Minister. The faculty was opened on 6 April 1960. and a temporary office was set up at the School of Medical Technology of the University of Medical Sciences. The Hospital of Tropical Diseases was then opened in 1962 and all offices and departments were moved to this location. At this time the only degree given was the Graduate Diploma in Tropical Medicine and Hygiene (D.T.M.&H.)

In 1965, the Southeast Asian Ministers of Education Organization (SEAMEO) was set up which saw importance in tropical medicine in Southeast Asia. The government of Thailand then organised this faculty to be a training site for medical personnel in tropical medicine, and the faculty became the center of the SEAMEO-TROPMED Network. The curriculum was also improved upon by the Liverpool School of Tropical Medicine. In 1993, the faculty became a SEAMEO Regional Center for Tropical Medicine.

The faculty is now part of the following academic collaborations:

- SEAMEO-Tropmed Network
- Mahidol-Oxford Tropical Medicine Research Unit (MORU), in collaboration with the University of Oxford and the Wellcome Trust
- WorldWide Antimalarial Resistance Network (WWARN) - Asia Regional Centre
- Mahidol-Osaka Center for Infectious Disease (MOCID), in collaboration with Osaka University
- BIKEN Endowed Department of Dengue Vaccine Development
- Malaria Consortium - Regional Office for Asia, in collaboration with the Malaria Consortium
- Silom Community Clinic at Trop Med (SCC@TropMed)

== Departments ==
- Department of Clinical Tropical Medicine
- Department of Helminthology
- Department of Medical Entomology
- Department of Microbiology and Immunology
- Department of Protozoology
- Department of Social and Environmental Medicine
- Department of Tropical Hygiene
- Department of Tropical Nutrition and Food Science
- Department of Tropical Pathology
- Department of Tropical Pediatrics
- Department of Molecular Tropical Medicine and Genetics

== See also ==
- Mahidol University
- Hospital for Tropical Diseases (Thailand)
