= Hospital for Tropical Diseases (Thailand) =

Coordinates: 13.766444°N 100.533699°E

Hospital for Tropical Diseases โรงพยาบาลเวชศาสตร์เขตร้อน

Geography
- Location: 420/6 Ratchawithi Road, Thung Phaya Thai Subdistrict, Ratchathewi District, Bangkok 10400, Thailand

Organisation
- Type: University, Specialised
- Affiliated university: Faculty of Tropical Medicine, Mahidol University

Services
- Beds: 250

History
- Opened: 23 February 1961

Links
- Website: www.tropmedhospital.com
- Lists: Hospitals in Thailand

The Hospital for Tropical Diseases (Thai: โรงพยาบาลเวชศาสตร์เขตร้อน) is a hospital in Ratchathewi District, Bangkok. It is a public hospital operated by the Faculty of Tropical Medicine, Mahidol University. It specialises in tropical medicine and, since 2012, travel medicine. It is one of the two institutes in Thailand (and also the world) that offers a travel medicine residency program (the other is the Institute of Preventive Medicine, Ministry of Public Health).

== History ==
The Hospital for Tropical Diseases was opened on 23 February 1961 by Prof. Chamlong Harinasuta, M.D. and Prof. Khunying Tranakchit Harinasuta, M.D, founders of the Faculty of Tropical Medicine. The first building was a three-storey building which had only 20 beds and received only in-patients, usually transferred from Siriraj Hospital, or from other hospitals. After an increase in patient demand, the hospital was expanded to a five-storey building which was completed and opened in November 1964. In 1967, there were 100 beds and today, the hospital has up to 250 beds. In 2000-2001, the hospital opened a Thai traditional medicine clinic and a Chinese traditional medicine clinic. In 2005, a travel clinic was opened and in 2012, a fever clinic. In 2013, the new 'Rajanagarindra' Building was opened by Princess Maha Chakri Sirindhorn and a "Trop Med Home Care" service was introduced to provide health care services for the elderly at home.

== See also ==
- Health in Thailand
- Healthcare in Thailand
- Hospitals in Thailand
- Mahidol University
