= Khlong Saen Saep =

Canal in central Thailand

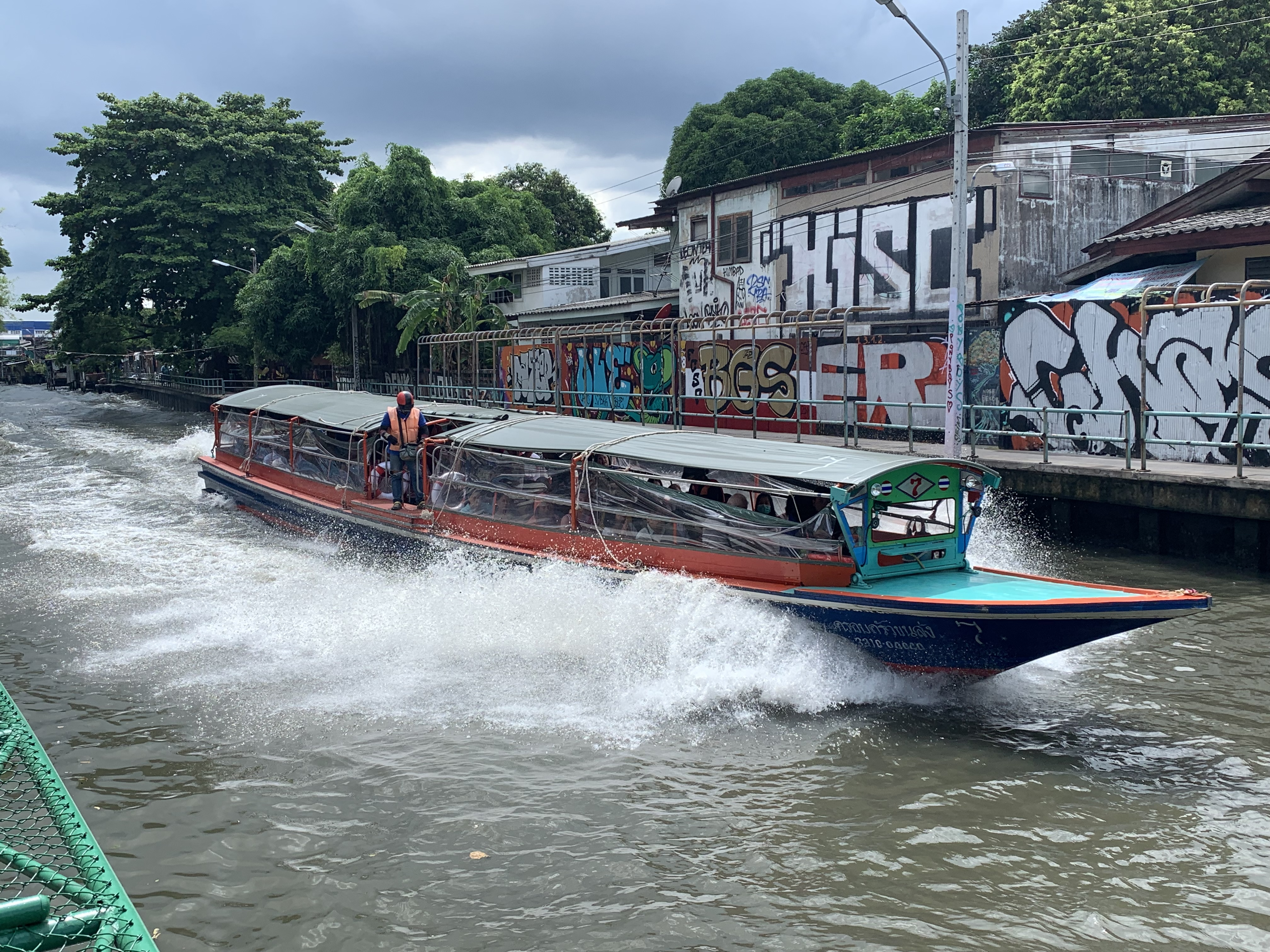
- Express boat service on the Khlong Saen Saep
- Interactive map of Khlong Saen Saep
- Country: Thailand

Specifications
- Length: 72 km (45 miles)

Geography
- Start point: Khlong Maha Nak
- End point: Bang Pakong River
- Beginning coordinates: 13.7531°N 100.5175°E
- Ending coordinates: 13.8741°N 101.1419°E

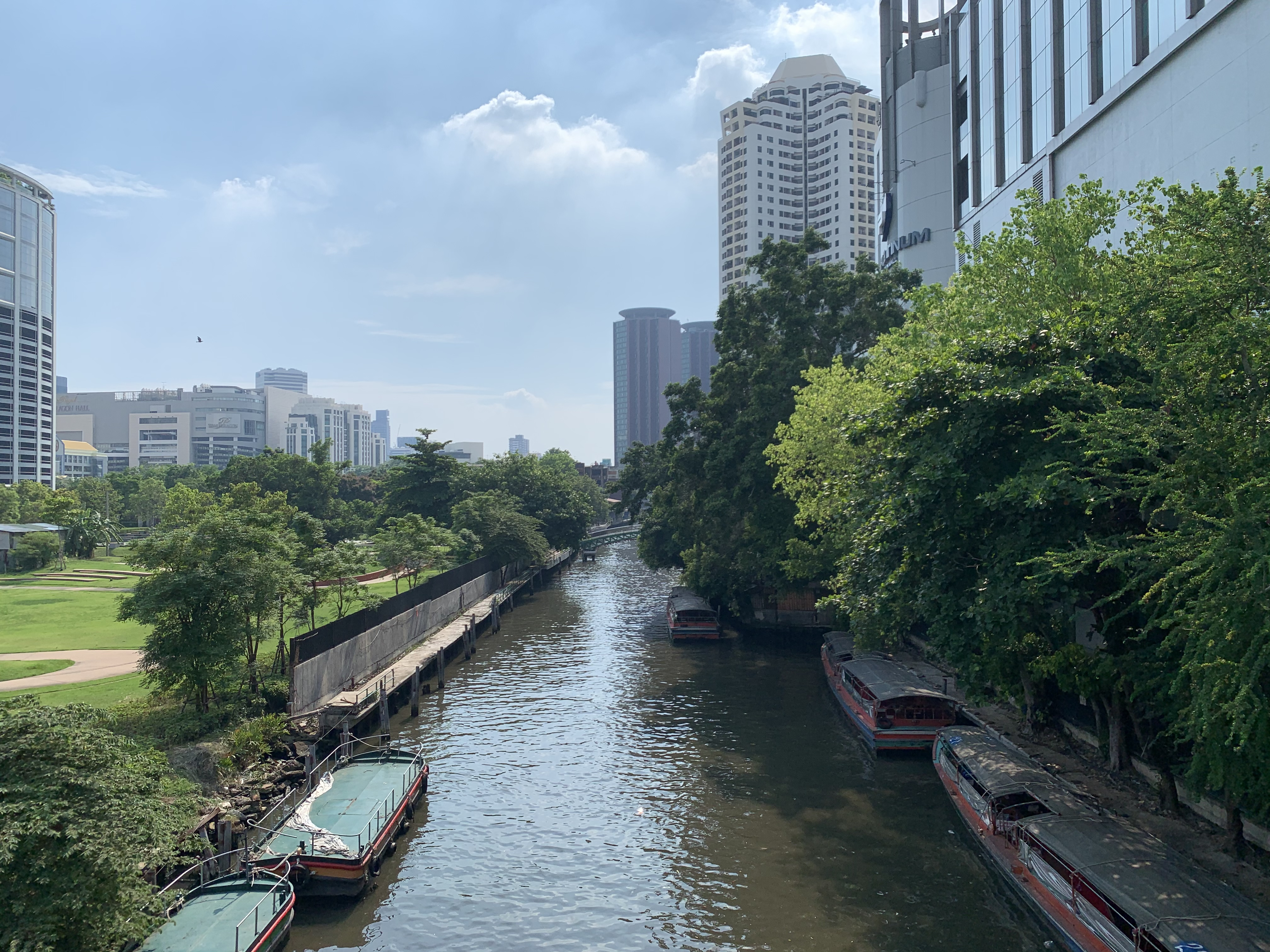
The canal at Ratchadamri Road

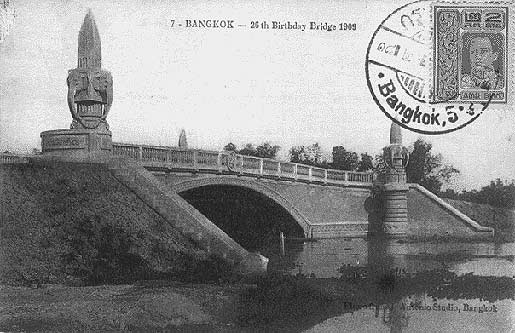
Bridge "Saphan Chaloem La 56" at Phaya Thai Road over Khlong Saen Saep, built in 1908 by King Chulalongkorn.

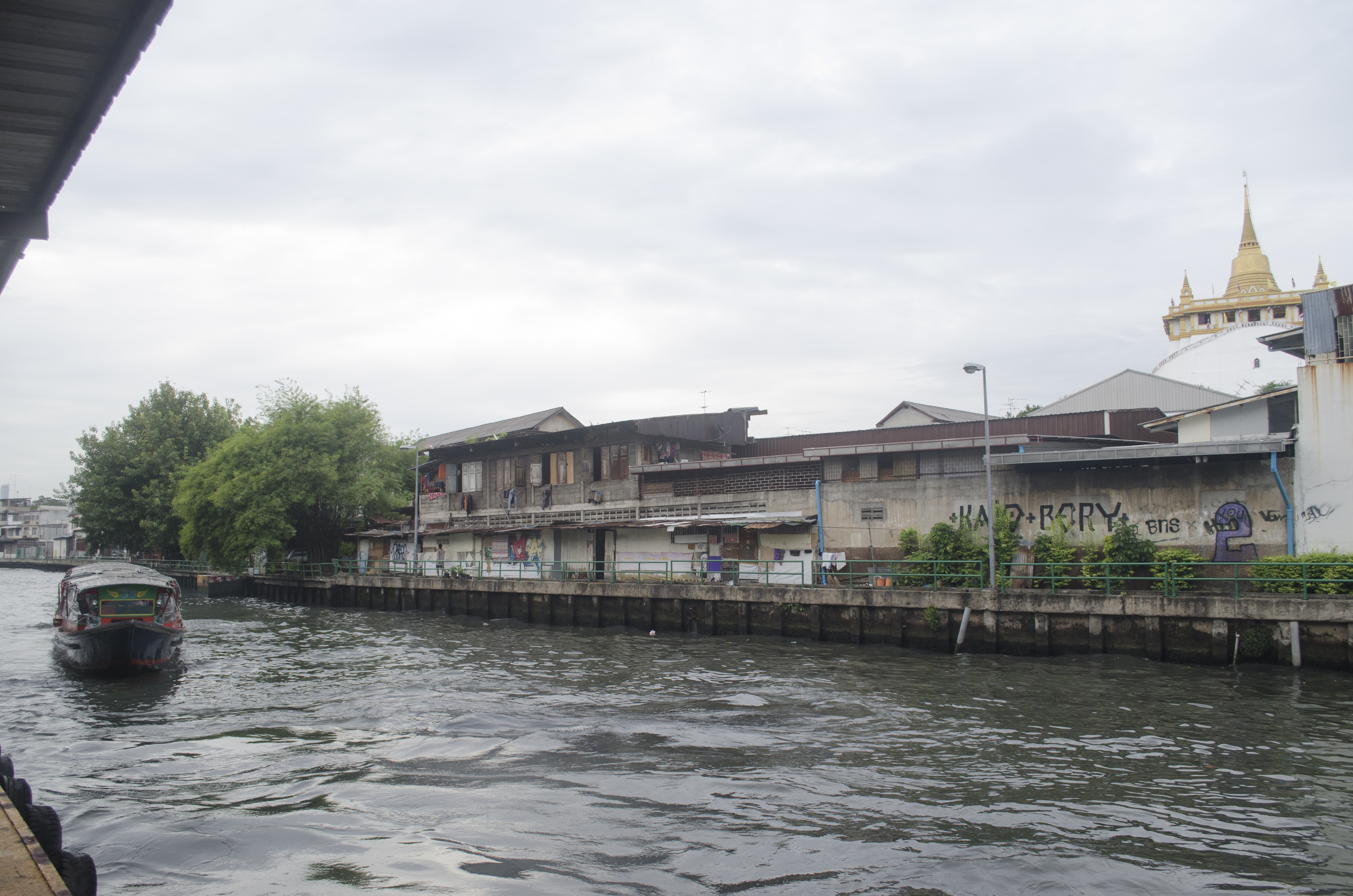
A boat approaches the Panfa Leelard Pier with Golden Mount Temple on the right corner

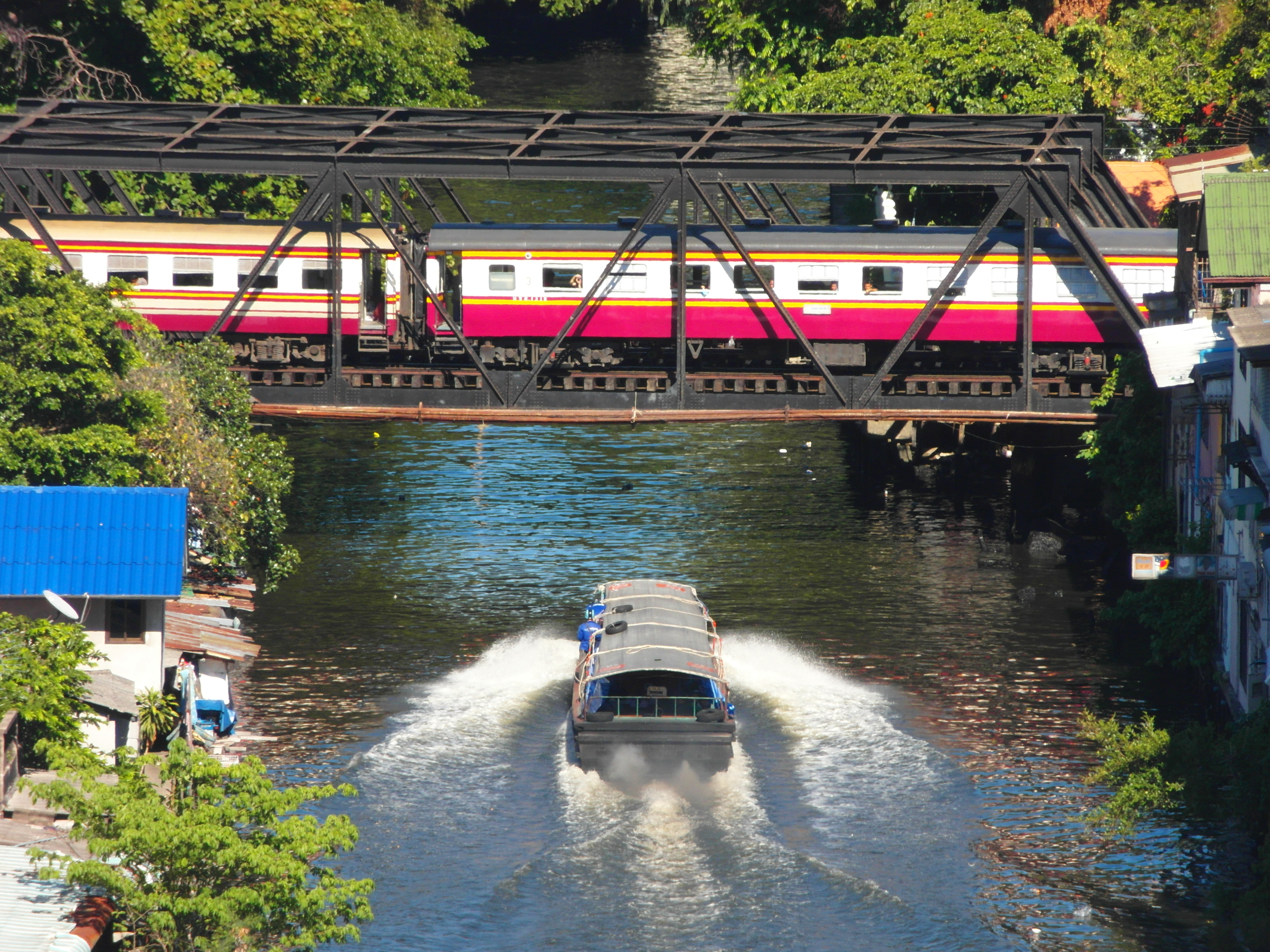
A train runs across the bridge over Khlong Saen Saep, near Bobae Market and Wat Boromniwat, just as an express boat service passes underneath

Khlong Saen Saep (Thai: คลองแสนแสบ, IPA: [kʰlɔ̄ːŋ sɛ̌ːn sɛ̀ːp]) is a canal (khlong) in central Thailand, connecting the Chao Phraya River to Prachinburi Province and Chachoengsao. A portion of the canal is used for public transport by an express boat service in Bangkok. The 72 km long canal passes through 21 districts and is connected to more than 100 smaller canals.

== History ==
The Saen Saep Canal was built on the order of King Rama III during a conflict between Siam and Annam over Cambodia in order to establish water transport for soldiers and weapons. Construction began in 1837 and cost 96,000 Baht (480 million baht adjusted for inaflation.). Construction was finished in three years. Klong Saen Saep was once filled with lotus plants. King Mongkut, Rama IV (1851–1868) built Sa Pathum Palace (Lotus Pond Palace) in Siam District. The name of the palace and present-day Pathum Wan District are derived from it.

The Saen Saep starts from Maha Nak Canal (Khlong Maha Nak) (Thai: คลองมหานาค) at Ban Krua on the border of Ratchathewi and Pathum Wan Districts. In Chachoengsao Province it ends in the Bang Pakong River.

== Environmental ==
The Saen Saep Canal is one of Bangkok's major drainage arteries. It is also heavily polluted. In 2015, Prime Minister Prayut Chan-o-cha initiated a two-year effort to clean up the canal in 2017–2018. A survey by the Pollution Control Department (PCD) inspected 631 buildings and residences beside the canal, concluding that there were 412 sources of pollution, including 62 hospitals, 107 restaurants, 14 markets, 66 hotels, 144 condominiums, 81 department stores, and 157 homes. Between October 2015 and January 2017, the department inspected 210 of the potential polluters and found that 40 percent of hotels, 23 percent of hospitals, 20 percent of department stores, and 50 percent of condominiums discharged waste water into the canal in contravention of existing laws. The department charged the 49 worst offenders with illegally discharging wastewater into a public watercourse. Those charged must pay a 2,000 baht daily fine until they fix waste management problems and halt illegal discharges. The remaining 363 establishments were ordered to improve wastewater treatment standards. The PCD refused to reveal the identity of the polluters. To maintain the cleanliness of the canal Natural Resources and Environment Minister General Surasak Kanjanarat proposed charging waste water treatment fees to households and tourists. "If we do nothing, all rivers and canals in the next 20 years will be completely ruined. And if you are not ready to pay now, you might have to pay more in the future.", he said. The PCD recommended that the charge should be 0.43 baht per cubic metre. This would bring in 5.3 billion baht per year. Plans have been made to charge each tourist 50 baht for waste water treatment which will bring in an additional 1.5 billion baht of revenue each year, assuming 29.9 million tourists, the number who visited in 2016. The PCD intends to study wastewater treatment in an additional 21 districts with sub-canals linked to the Saen Saep Canal.

In June 2019, the PCD reported that the water quality of the canal has improved due to its efforts. No BOD figures were reported to corroborate this claim. PCD's latest survey of discharges into the canal identified 720 pollution sources along the canal's length. At least 253 of these sources face fines of 2,000 baht per day until the wastewater is treated properly before being discharged.

== Transport ==
An express boat service operates on the Saen Saep between Pom Prap Sattru Phai and Bang Kapi Districts, providing ferry service in traffic-congested central Bangkok. The service has a checkered reputation, due to the polluted water in the khlong and the slapdash nature of the service. The northern line ends at Golden Mount, and the southern line ends at NIDA. Boats go past Watthana and Huai Khwang Districts, running parallel to Petchaburi Road.
