= Ratchathewi district =

Ratchathewi ราชเทวี
- Khet
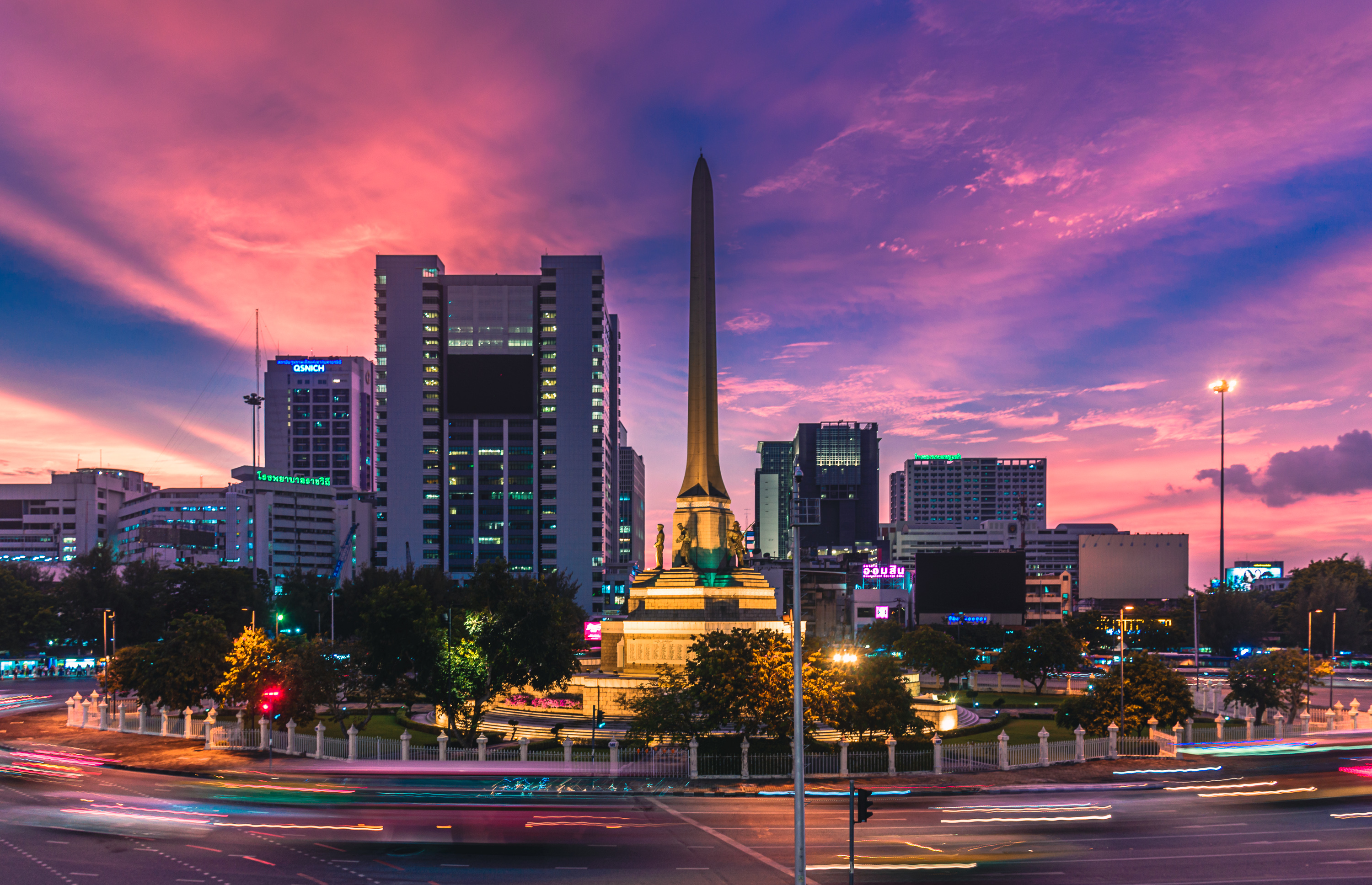
- Victory Monument

- Khet location in Bangkok
- Coordinates: 13°45′32″N 100°32′04″E
- Country: Thailand
- Province: Bangkok
- Seat: Thung Phaya Thai
- Khwaeng: 4
- Khet established: 9 November 1989

Area
  - Total: 7.126 km^{2} (2.751 sq mi)

Population (2017)
  - Total: 72,304
  - Density: 10,146.5/km^{2} (26,279/sq mi)
- Time zone: UTC+7 (ICT)
- Postal code: 10400
- Geocode: 1037

Ratchathewi (Thai: ราชเทวี, pronounced [râːt.t͡ɕʰā.tʰēː.wīː]) is a district (khet) in central Bangkok, Thailand. Clockwise from the north, its neighboring districts are Phaya Thai, Din Daeng, Huai Khwang, Watthana, Pathum Wan and Dusit.

== History ==
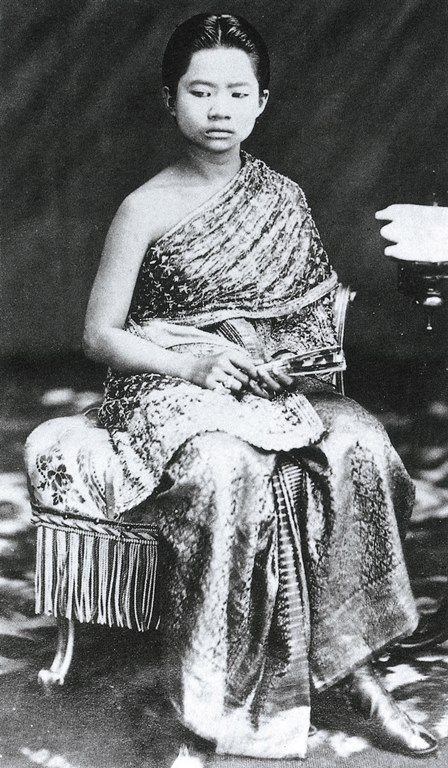
Queen Sukumalmarsri

The district was part of Dusit district prior to 1966, and part of Phaya Thai District from 1966 to 1989, when it was elevated to its own district. The name is inherited from Ratchathewi Intersection, which is the intersection of Phetchaburi Road and Phaya Thai Road. The name originally comes from a royal consort to King Chulalongkorn, Phra Nangchao Sukumalmarsri Phra Ratchathewi. The term Phra Rachathewi (also spelled Phra Rajadevi) is a royal rank for royal consorts.

== Administration ==
District map

The district is sub-divided into four sub-district (khwaeng).

| 1. | Thung Phaya Thai | ทุ่งพญาไท |
| 2. | Thanon Phaya Thai | ถนนพญาไท |
| 3. | Thanon Phetchaburi | ถนนเพชรบุรี |
| 4. | Makkasan | มักกะสัน |

== Landmarks ==
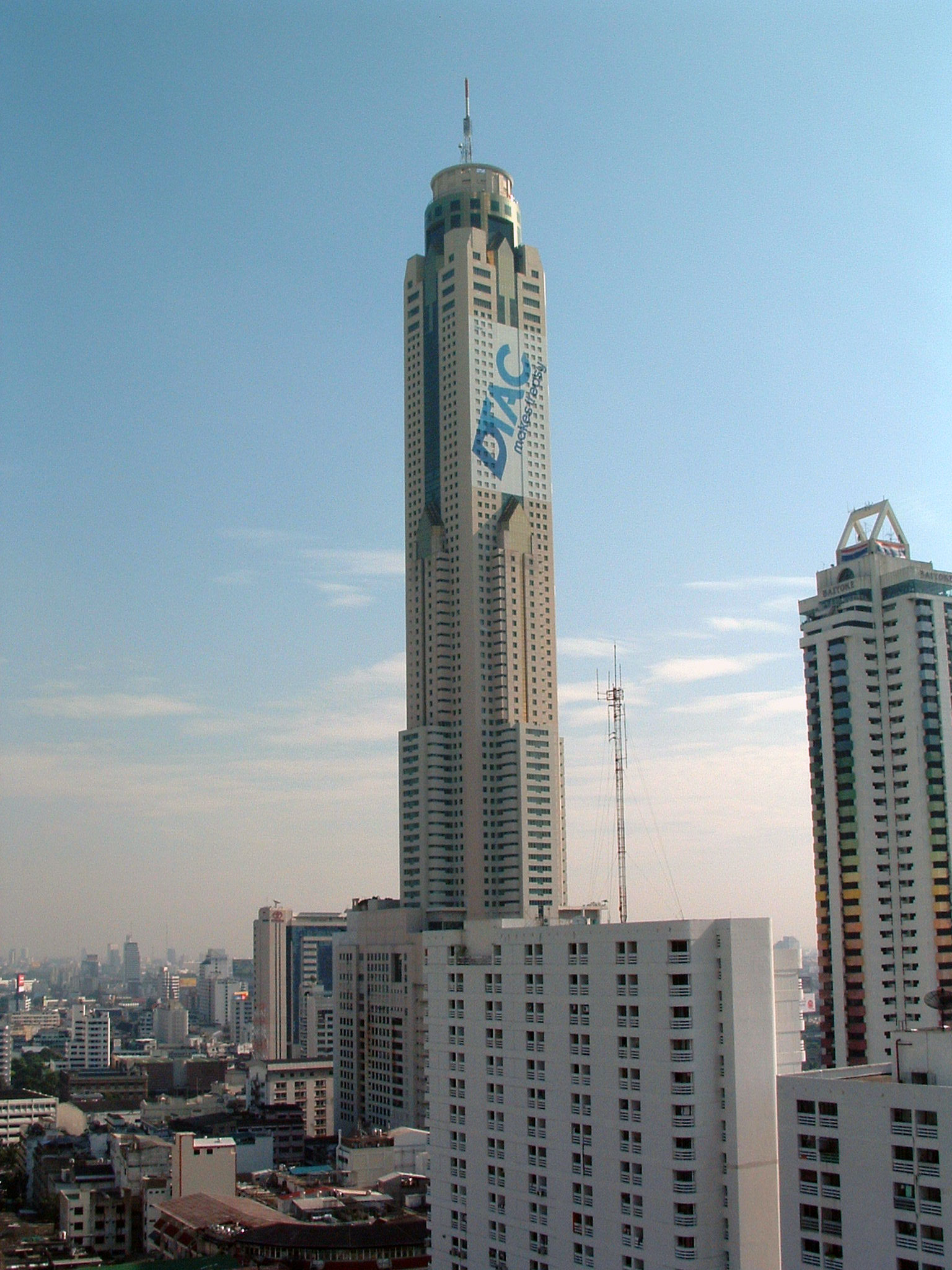
Baiyoke Tower II

=== Victory Monument ===
Victory Monument was built by Prime Minister Plaek Phibunsongkhram to honour the 59 soldiers who died in the French-Thai War. The opening ceremony was held on 24 June 1942. It was built to the shape of five bayonets joined and five statues around its base representing army, navy, air force, police, and civilian bureaucracy. There are 809 names inscribed below the statues, including the losses from World War II and the Korean War. The BTS skytrain station is nearby, and it used to be a major bus hub (until the 2016 when the bus hub was relocated to Mo Chit 2 Bus Station, platform area 3).

=== Baiyoke Tower ===
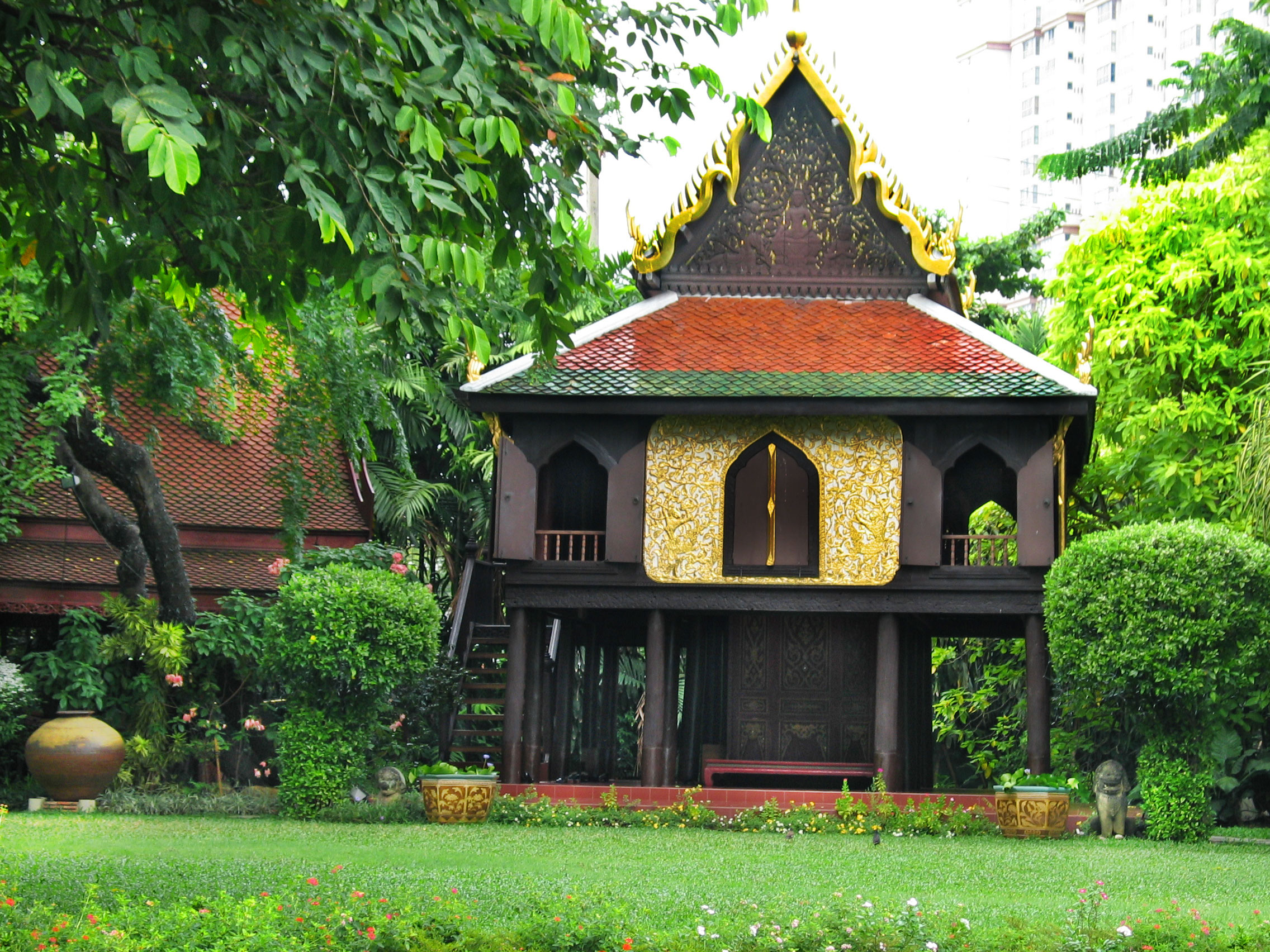
Suan Pakkad Palace

Baiyoke Tower (151 meters high, 43 floors) and Baiyoke Tower II (304 m, 85 fl) are both former tallest buildings in Bangkok that cannot be missed from the skyline. They are located in proximity in the area known as Pratu Nam. The construction of Baiyoke Tower was finished in 1987 and remained the tallest until 1993. Baiyoke Tower II was finished in late 1997 and opened to public January 1998. Both buildings are mostly utilized as hotels Baiyoke Suite (in tower I) and Baiyoke Sky (tower II) with lower floors as commercial shops.

=== Suan Pakkad Palace ===
Suan Pakkad Palace is a museum exhibiting Thai antiques, from ancient to recent ones. The museum compound contains eight traditional wooden Thai houses with exhibits inside. The old Ban Chiang pottery dates back to 4,000 years ago is among the highlight exhibits and is located in a modern Chumbhot-Pantip gallery building. In the former days, the palace used to be the location of the bridge known as Phra Ratchathewi Bridge crossing Khlong Phra Chae Chin, both of which have since been removed and replaced by what is now Ratchathewi Intersection.

== Diplomatic missions ==
- Embassy of East Timor
- Embassy of Indonesia

== Transportation ==
- BTS skytrain - Three stations: Ratchathewi, Phaya Thai and Victory Monument.
- MRT - One station: Phetchaburi.
- Airport Rail Link - Three stations: Phaya Thai, Ratchaprarop and Makkasan.
- SRT Eastern Line - Four stations: Phaya Thai Halt, Makkasan and Asok Halt.
- Express boats - Khlong Saen Saeb, in the southern district border.

Makkasan Railway Station is a major station for the Airport Rail Link to Suvarnabhumi Airport. The station was the City Air Terminal with check in facility and non-stop train to the airport, although this has no longer been the case since 2014. The Makkasan station is also an interchange to MRT Phetchaburi station.

== Bueng Makkasan ==
Located in Ratchathewi district is a large artificial lake in the center of Bangkok. Bueng Makkasan (บึงมักกะสัน) is 2.4 km long, 60 m wide and 15 m deep. It is utilized for inner Bangkok flood prevention. Now the lake is covered by the system of expressway interconnections.

== Health ==
- Public Hospitals
  - Ramathibodi Hospital
  - Phramongkutklao Hospital
  - Rajavithi Hospital
  - Queen Sirikit National Institute of Child Health
  - Hospital for Tropical Diseases
  - Burachat Chaiyakorn Hospital
- Private Hospitals
  - Bhumirajanagarindra Kidney Institute
  - Phyathai 1 Hospital

== Education ==
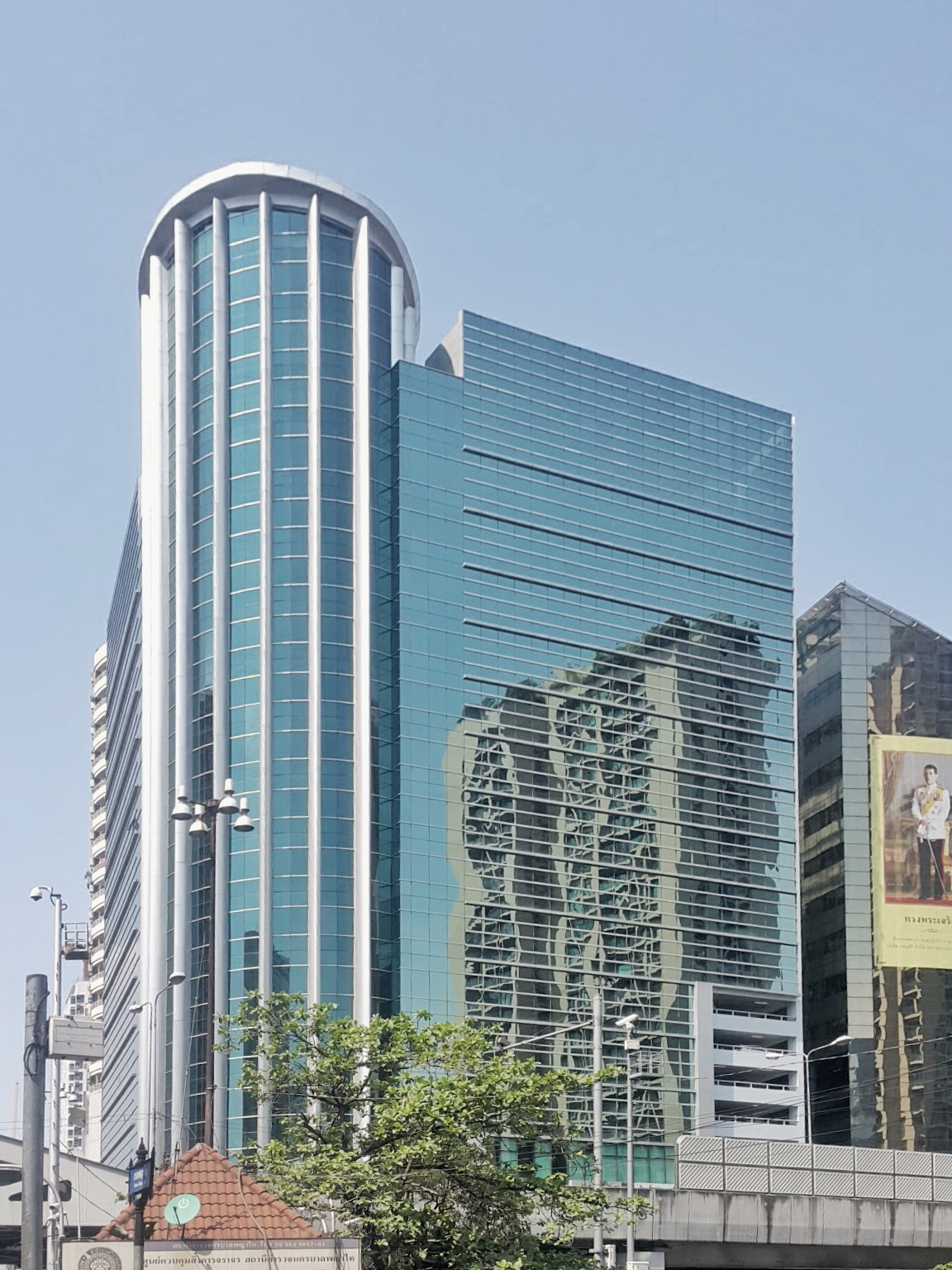
Wannasorn Tower, the Thai tutoring school hun

- Universities
  - Mahidol University: Phaya Thai Campus, consists of
    - Faculty of Medicine Ramathibodi Hospital
    - Faculty of Dentistry
    - Faculty of Science
    - Faculty of Pharmacy
    - Faculty of Public Health
    - Faculty of Tropical Medicine
  - College of Medicine, Rangsit University
  - Phramongkutklao College of Medicine
  - Royal Thai Army Nursing College
  - Valaya Alongkorn Rajabhat University: Bangkok Campus, Rajabhat University located at 153 Phetchaburi Road, Thung Phaya Thai Sub-District, Ratchathewi District near Siam Commercial Bank, Phetchaburi Road Branch, its name after Valaya Alongkorn, Princess of Phetchaburi.
- Schools
  - The Indonesian School of Bangkok, is located at the Indonesian Embassy compound in the district.
  - Sri Ayudhya School, a high school located on Si Ayutthaya Road, Thanon Phaya Thai Sub-District, Ratchathewi District.
  - Santirat Witthayalai School, a high school located on Si Ayutthaya Road, Thung Phaya Thai Sub-District, Ratchathewi District.
  - Amnuay Silpa School, a coeducational private school located on Si Ayutthaya Road, Thung Phaya Thai Sub-District, Ratchathewi District.
  - Phaya Thai School, primary school located on Si Ayutthaya Road, Thung Phaya Thai Sub-District, Ratchathewi District.
  - Saint Dominic School, boys' school located on New Phetchaburi Road, Makkasan Sub-District, Ratchathewi District
- Other
  - Wannasorn Tower, the education hub located by the Phaya Thai junction, was founded by Uraiwan Sivakul, a Chemistry tutor. The tower is now the main hub of Thai tutoring schools.

== Gallery ==
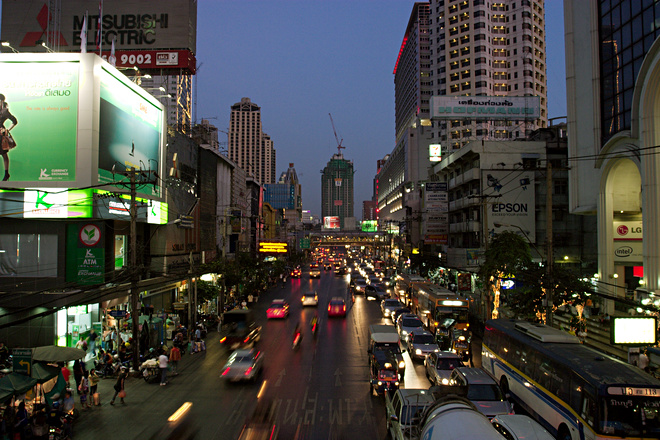
Pratu Nam zone at night

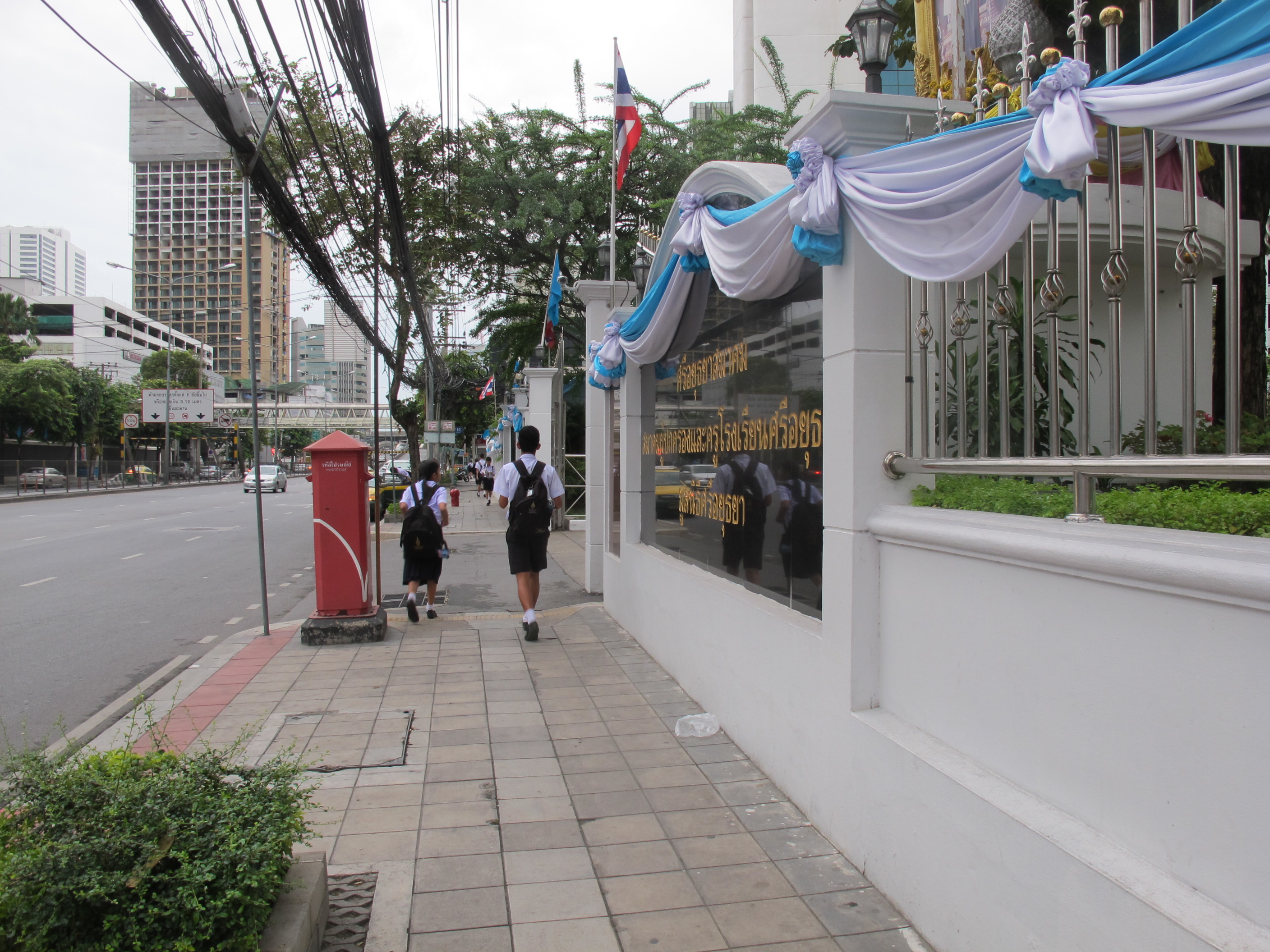
Footpath of Si Ayutthaya Road in front of Sri Ayudhya School

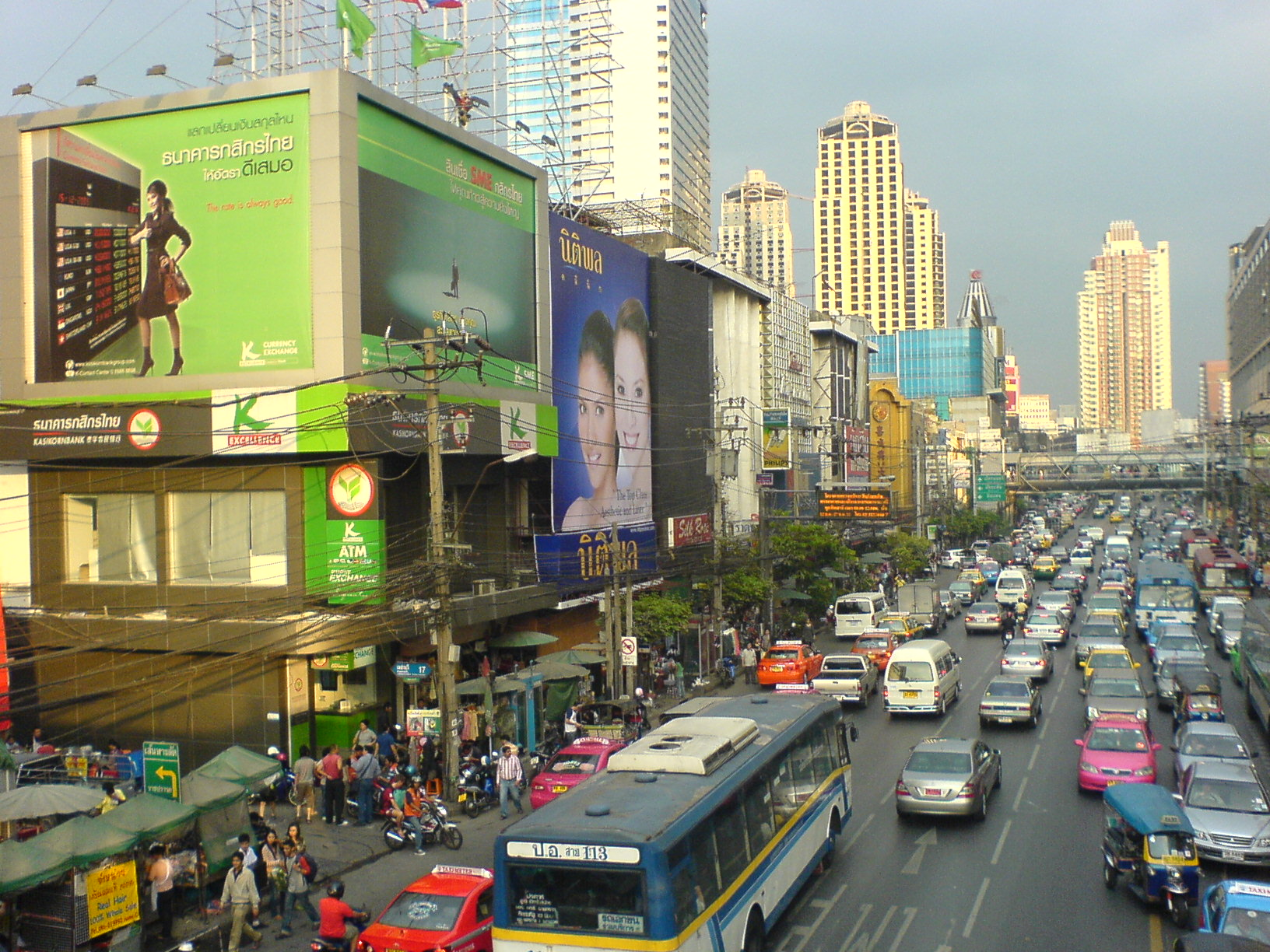
View of Phetchaburi Road

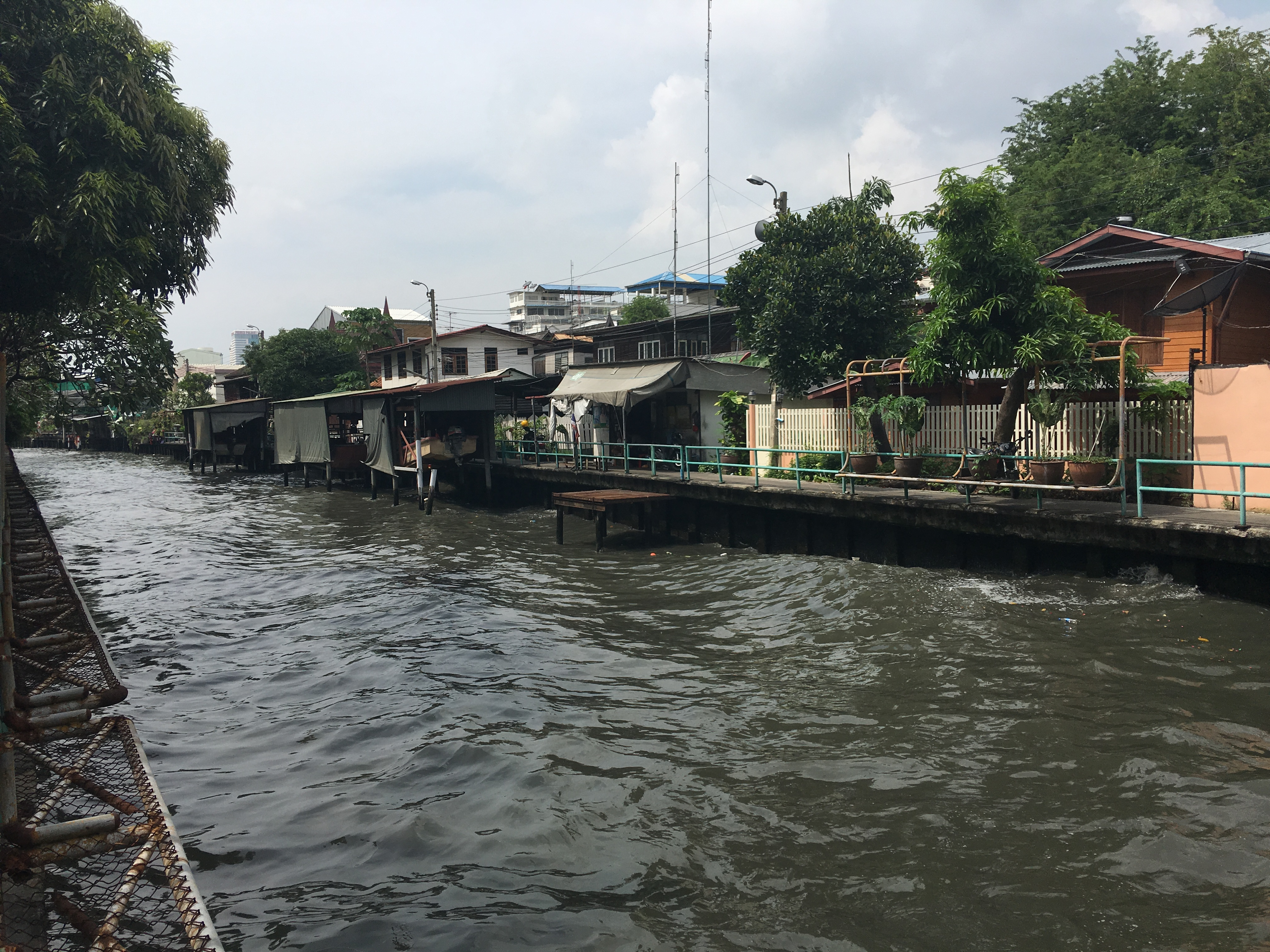
Phase of Khlong Saen Saep in the area of Ban Krua Community, the historic Thai silk Muslim community

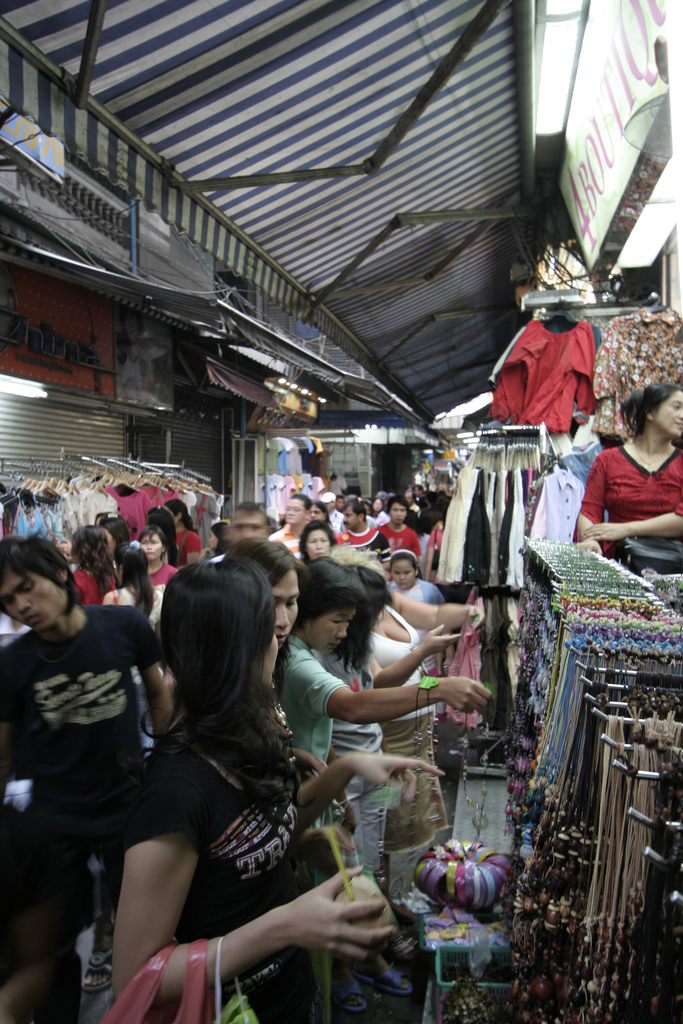
Atmosphere of Pratu Nam Market

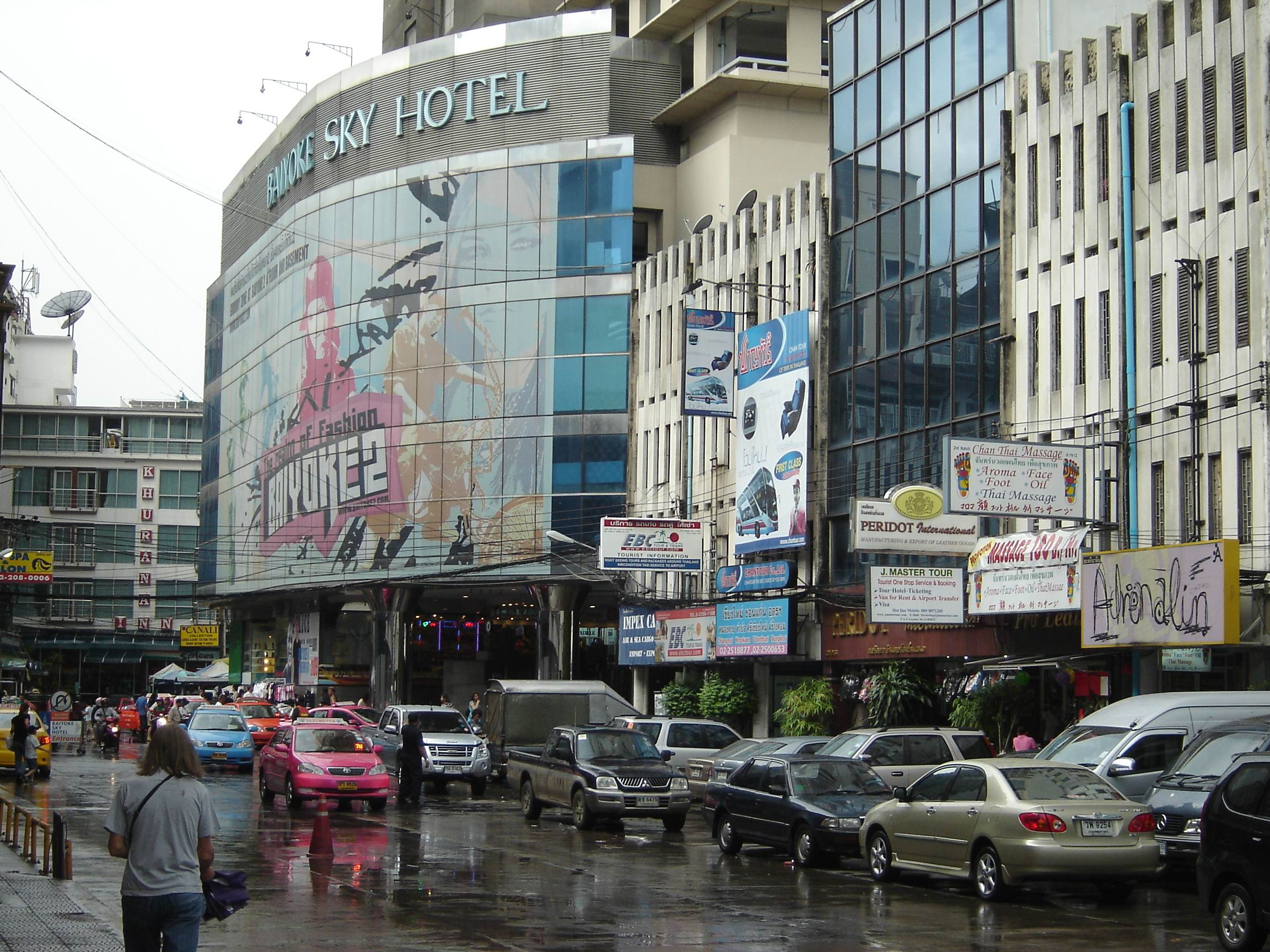
Entrance of Baiyoke Tower II (Pratu Nam Market, Soi Phetchaburi 21)

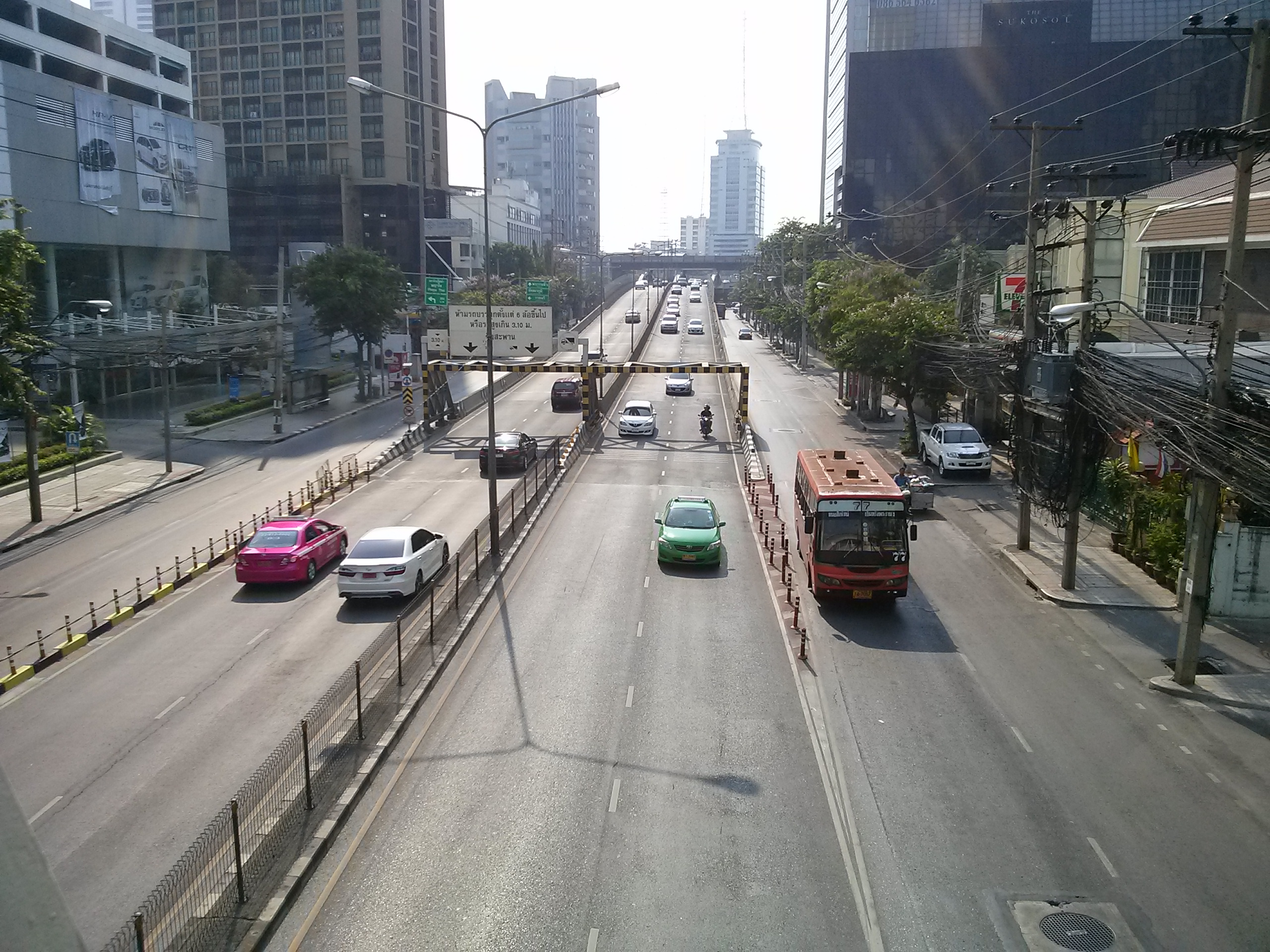
Overpass of Si Ayutthaya Road, side toward Dusit

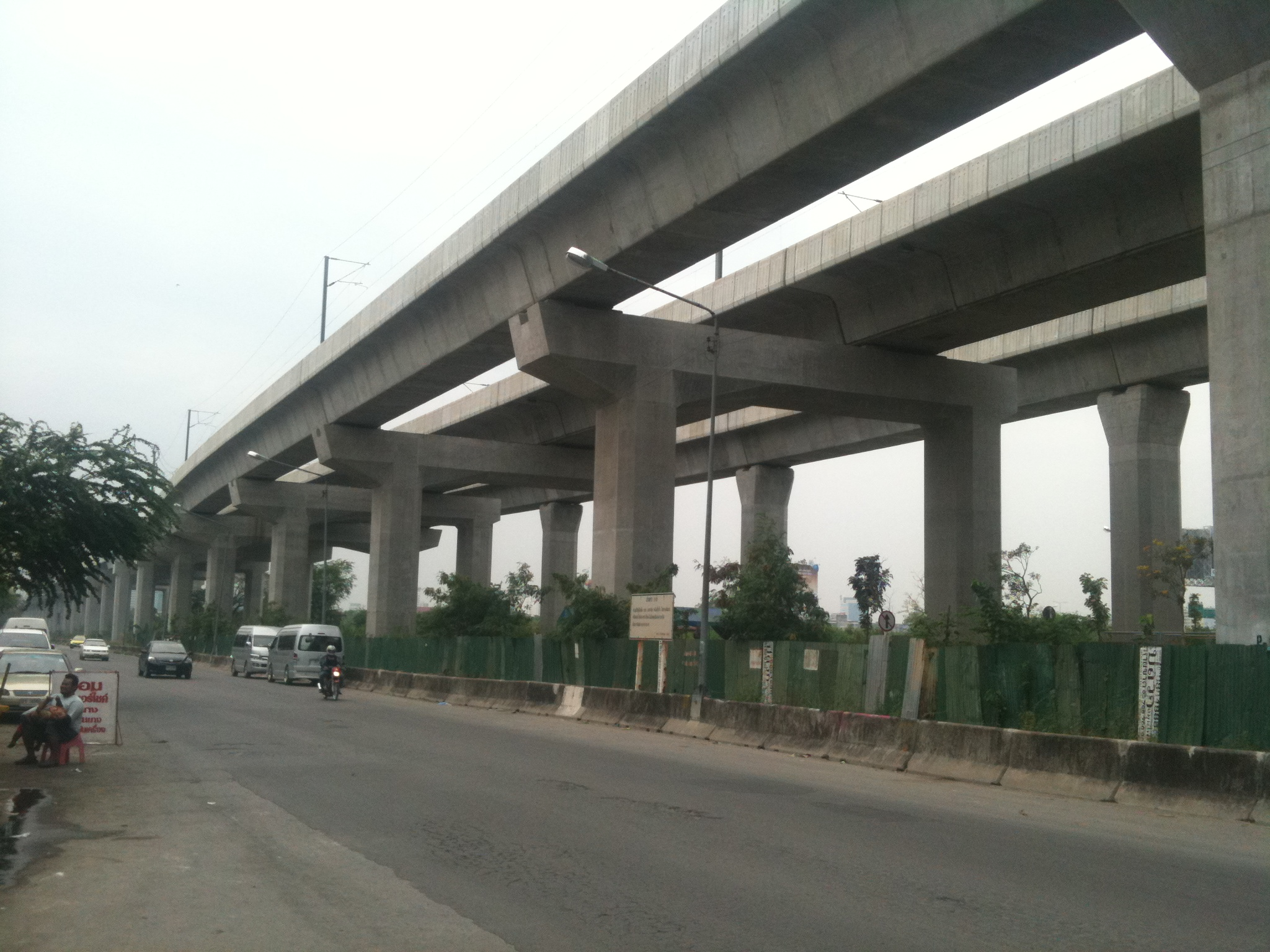
Airport Link
