= Ratchathewi station =

Skytrain station in Bangkok, Thailand

Ratchathewi ราชเทวี
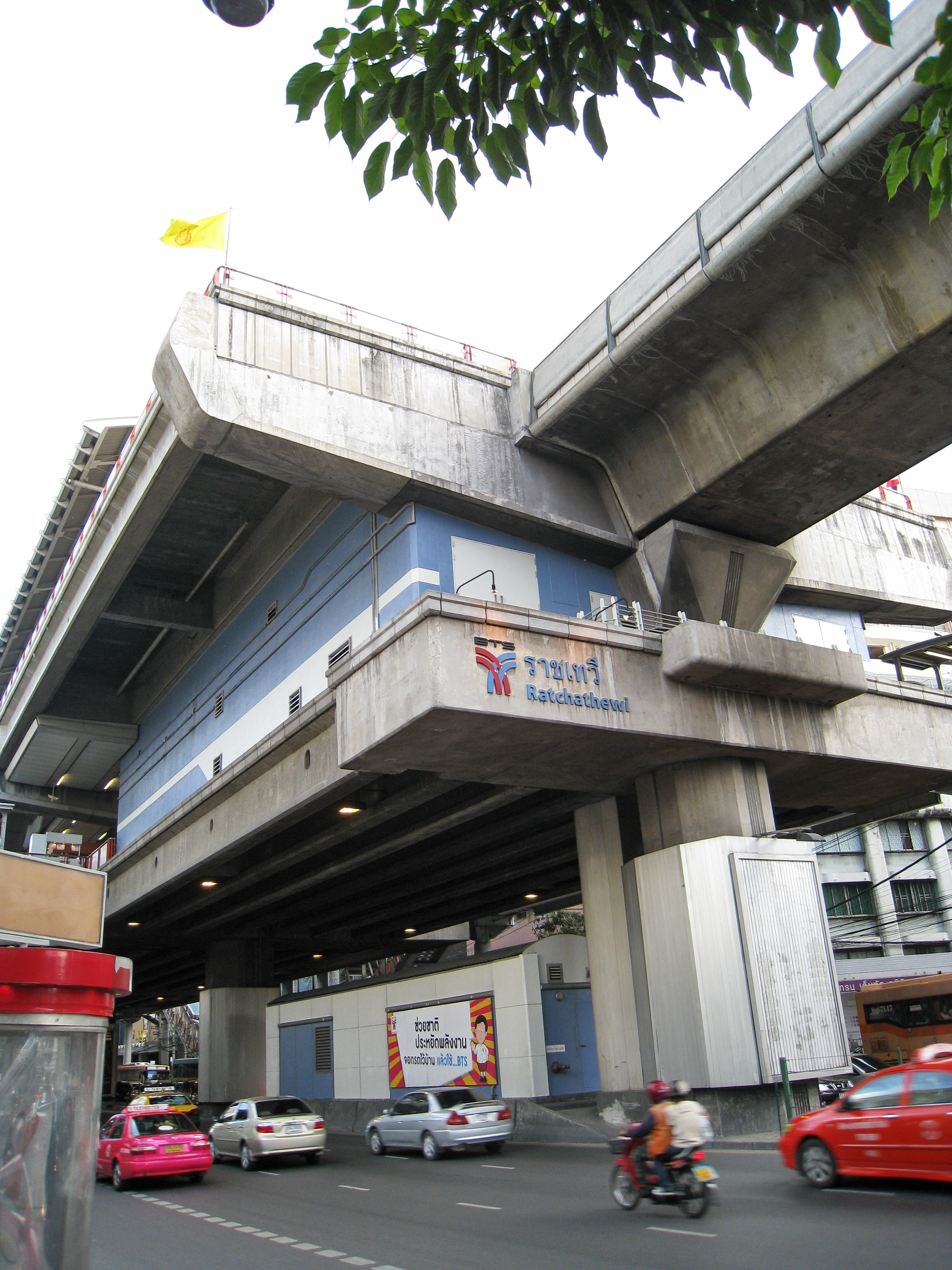

General information
- Location: Ratchathewi; Bangkok; Thailand
- Coordinates: 13°45′6.75″N 100°31′53.67″E
- System: BTS MRT
- Owner: Bangkok Metropolitan Administration (BMA); BTS Rail Mass Transit Growth Infrastructure Fund (BTSGIF)
- Operator: Bangkok Mass Transit System; Public Company Limited (BTSC)
- Line: Sukhumvit Line MRT (future)

Other information
- Station code: N1; OR08

History
- Opened: 5 December 1999

Passengers
- 2021: 1,237,846

Services
Preceding station	BTS Skytrain	Following station
Phaya Thai towards Khu Khot	Sukhumvit Line	Siam towards Kheha
Preceding station	Metropolitan Rapid Transit	Following station
Under construction
Yommarat towards Taling Chan	Orange Line	Pratunam towards Yaek Rom Klao
Location

Ratchathewi Station Traditional sign

Ratchathewi station (Thai: สถานีราชเทวี, pronounced [sā.tʰǎː.nīː râːt.t͡ɕʰā.tʰēː.wīː]) is a BTS skytrain station, on the Sukhumvit Line in Ratchathewi District, Bangkok, Thailand. In the future, it will become an interchange station for the MRT Orange Line following the opening of the western extension in 2030. The station is located on Phaya Thai Road to the south of Ratchathewi intersection, about 10 minutes walk to Pantip Plaza on the way to Pratunam market. The station is also linked by a skybridge to Asia Hotel (where the Calypso Cabaret show used to be held), and by escalators and stairs to a recently created area known as Co-Co Walk that houses several relatively low cost restaurants and bars used mostly by the locals, some "antique" shops, and the one remaining software vendor displaced from Hollywood Street that occupied the rear of the site that formerly hosted a theatre/cinema; Co-Co Walk adjoins the Hollywood Arcade that appears to no longer function as retail premises.

== Facilities ==
- Khlong Saen Saep Express Boat service at Saphan Hua Chang (or Ratchathewi) Pier (southern side of Hua Chang bridge) to Pratunam market and Golden Mount

== See also ==
- Bangkok Skytrain
