= Central Nakhon Pathom =

- Location: Mueang Nakhon Pathom district, Nakhon Pathom, Thailand
- Coordinates: 13.8055°N 100.0485°E
- Address: 833 Phet Kasem rd, Sanam Chan subdistrict, Mueang Nakhon Pathom district, Nakhon Pathom 73000
- Opened: March 30, 2024
- Developer: Central Pattana
- Manager: Central Pattana
- Owner: Central Pattana
- Num. of stores: 500+
- Floor area: 14,000 km^{2}
- Floors: 4

Central Nakhon Pathom (Thai: เซ็นทรัลนครปฐม) is a shopping mall and department store in Nakhon Pathom province on the western outskirts of Bangkok, Thailand. It features a shopping centre, park, hotel, condominium and housing project under mixed-use concept.

== Design ==
The mall's design is inspired by Phra Pathom Chedi, a landmark of the province used as models for the design of the main building and interior decoration. The main colour tone of golden yellow is the same shade as the cetiya (pagoda).

== History ==
The mall launched on March 30, 2024, as Central Pattana's 42nd branch and also Central's second branch in Nakhon Pathom province besides Central Salaya. Central Nakhon Pathom built on an area of 14,000 km^{2} with an investment of over 500 million baht.

== Location ==
It lies on the corner of Phet Kasem Road and Ying Pao Tai road at Nong Kha Yang intersection in the city of Nakhon Pathom near Silpakorn University, Sanam Chandra Palace Campus, about 56 km (34.8 mi) west of Bangkok.

== Anchors ==
Anchors in the plaza include:

- Central The Store @ Nakhon Pathom
- Tops
- Nakhon Pathom Cineplex 5 Cinemas
- Power Buy
- B2S
  - OfficeMate
- Supersports
- Food Patio
- Auto1
- Uniqlo
- Jetts Fitness
- HarborLand
- Pathom Samosorn Market (Outdoor Market)
- Pathom Club
- Som O Public Park

The mall has more than 500 stores.
