= Central Bangna =

Central Bangna เซ็นทรัล บางนา
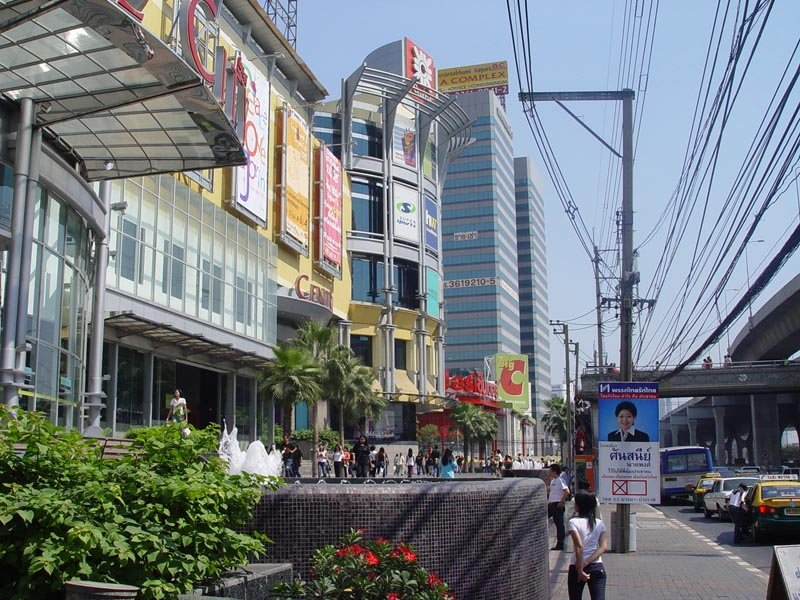
- In front of Central Bangna shopping mall before renovation in 2006
- Location: Bang Na, Bangkok, Thailand 10260
- Coordinates: 13.6684°N 100.6344°E
- Address: 587, 589 Debaratana Road, Bang Na Nuea
- Opened: December 3, 1993
- Developer: Central Pattana
- Manager: Sathit Wikhantanakul
- Owner: Central Pattana
- Num. of stores: 288
- Num. of anchor tenants: 5
- Floor area: 62,872 m^{2} (676,750 sq ft)
- Floors: Shopping mall 6 floors; Office 37 floors
- Parking: 3,250
- Website: www.centralplaza.co.th

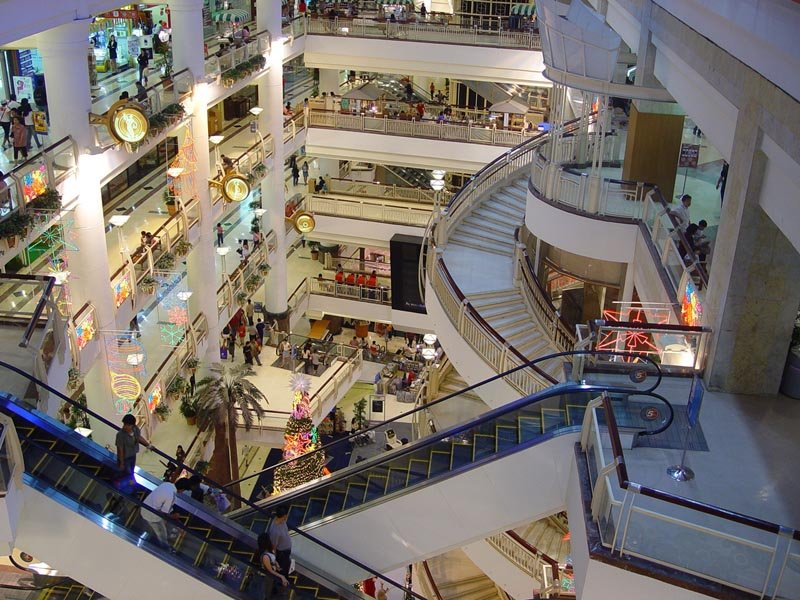
Inside the shopping centre

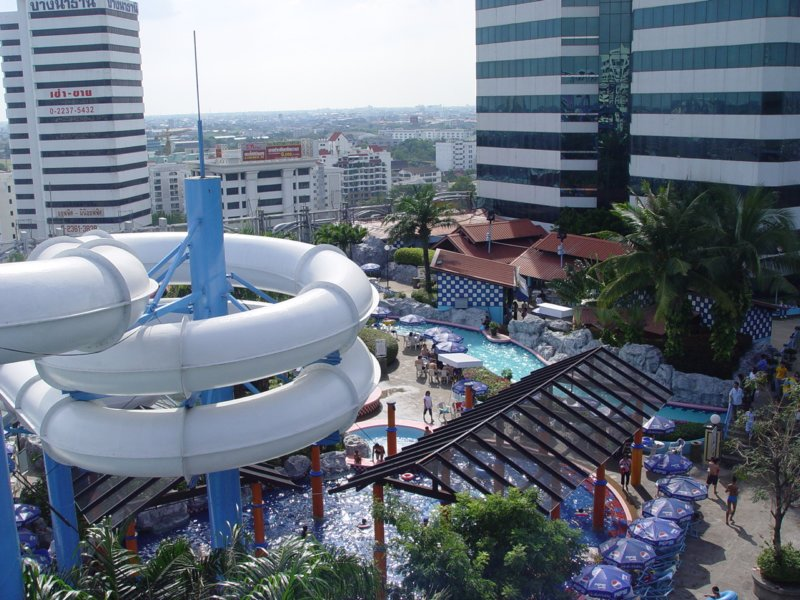
The roof with the swimpark

Central Bangna, also known as Central City Bangna (previously known as CentralPlaza Bangna), is a shopping centre on Bang Na–Trat Road located in Bang Na District in Bangkok, Thailand.

== History ==
The shopping mall was developed with joint investment of Central Pattana, Srivikorn Group, Navabhand Group and Tosapol Management Co., Ltd in December 1993. Later, in December 2001, Central Pattana acquired the shopping mall and then renovated it, including numerous exterior and interior improvements, new zoning and the development of innovative retail spaces.

CentralPlaza Bangna was under 2nd major renovation and expansion of retailing area of 10,000 square metres (110,000 sq ft) in late 2011 due to fierce competition in east Bangkok such as Megabangna, Paradise Park.

== Facilities ==
The mall has a total 6 floors with two basement floors.

=== Anchors ===
- Central The Store @ Bangna
- Tops Food Hall
- Food Patio
- Power Buy
- Supersports
- B2S
- Major Cineplex 11 Cinemas
- Bangna Hall
- Big C Bangna (Next to Shopping Mall)

=== Waterpark ===
The waterpark at CentralPlaza Bangna first opened as Leo Land Waterpark, located on the sixth floor of the department store. It was closed for a major renovation in 2014. On 18 February 2016, the waterpark was reopened as "Pororo AquaPark Bangkok", designed under the theme of Pororo the Little Penguin. It was the second Pororo Aquapark after the first opened in Singapore in 2015.

== Central City Tower ==
Central City Tower is a 37 floor office building located besides the CentralPlaza Bangna department store. Central Pattana has acquired the tower together with the department store in 2001. The tower's major tenant are tutors, a language school, health care & beauty parlors and a clinic.

== See also ==
- List of shopping malls in Thailand
