= Central Department Store =

Thai department store chain

Central Department Store ห้างสรรพสินค้าเซ็นทรัล
- Company type: Subsidiary
- Industry: Retailing
- Founded: 1927
- Founder: Tiang Chirathivat
- Headquarters: Bangkok, Thailand
- Area served: Thailand; Indonesia
- Key people: Natira Chirathivat Boonsri (President)
- Products: Clothing, accessories, cosmetics, housewares
- Owner: Central Retail Corporation
- Parent: Central Group
- Divisions: Robinson Department Store
- Website: www.central.co.th/th

Central Department Store (Thai: สรรพสินค้าเซ็นทรัล; Chinese: 尚泰; Pinyin: Shàngtài) is a Thai department store chain, owned by Central Group. It has branches in Thailand and Indonesia, and is also a Royal Warrant holder of the Thai Royal Family.

== History ==
In 1927, 22-year-old Tiang Chirathivat, an immigrant from mainland China, started a store in Bangkok named "Keng Seng Lee" or "baskets for sale", which was the start of an emporium.

Later that year, the store moved to Charoen Krung Road, in Bangkok's Si Phraya District. The store sold a large variety of local and international newspapers and magazines and carried the name "Central Trading Store". This was the first chapter of Central Department Stores' history.

In the 1950s, the company grew with more and more stores selling different items. It was one few stores in Bangkok that had the courage to order imported goods for sale and was the first to set up merchandising displays.

In 1973, the Chidlom store opened under the new "one stop shopping" concept. Here, customers could come to Central and buy everything they needed under one roof.

In 1981, the Central Lad Ya Branch opened its doors and was the largest of its kind then. Later in 1983 Central Ladprao opened its doors and was the largest shopping mall in Thailand at that time.

On 20 December 2005, King Bhumibol Adulyadej conferred on the company a Royal Warrant for its services, meaning they could display the royal Garuda emblem.

By 2010 Central operated 15 stores in Thailand and planned to open more.

In 2014, Central begin to expand overseas by establishing its operation in Indonesia. Central opened its first department store in the East wing of Grand Indonesia shopping mall in Central Jakarta, replacing the departed British department store chain Harvey Nichols. Central also briefly operate a short lived second department store in Neo Soho Mall in West Jakarta between 2016 and 2019 that was shut down due to low sales.

In 2019, Central announced that it plans to spend at least 10 billion baht between 2020 and 2024 to renovate 20 of its stores into a "lifestyle" concept, following the renaming of Zen, Central's lifestyle trend megastore brand, into Central. The CentralWorld branch will serve as the prototype of Central's new concept. For the first phase, Central Chidlom and two Central stores in CentralPlaza Ladprao and CentralPlaza Rama II will be renovated in 2020.

After Robinson Department Store was merged into Central, it was transferred to be under the management of Central Department Store.

== Stores ==
=== Bangkok Metropolitan Area ===
- Central Chidlom (standalone, first branch, flagship store)
- Central @ CentralWorld (previously ZEN, flagship store)
- Central Ladprao (first shopping mall branch)
- Central Ramindra
- Central Bangna
- Central Pinklao
- Central Rama 3
- Central Rama 2
- Central Chaengwattana
- Central Salaya
- Central WestGate
- Central EastVille
- Central WestVille
- Central Embassy (Central Childom's neighboring shopping mall, management in partnership with CPN)
- Central Silom Complex
- Central The Store @ Future Park Rangsit
- Central The Store @ Mega Bangna (Renovate from Robinson department store)
- Central Nakhon Pathom
- Central The Store @ Fashion Island (Renovate from Robinson department store)
- Central Bangrak (Renovate from Robinson department store)
- Dusit Central Park (It consists of smaller retail stores scattered throughout the shopping center.)
- Central GR9 (Renovate from Robinson department store)
- Central Sukhumvit (Under renovation from Robinson department store)
- The Central Phaholyothin (Opened in December 2026)

=== Southern Thailand ===
- Central Phuket – Floresta Building (previously located at Festival Building, Central's Central Phuket branch moved to Floresta in 2018)
- Central Patong (standalone)
- Central Hatyai
- Central Samui

=== Eastern Thailand ===
- Central Pattaya

=== Northeastern Thailand ===
- Central Korat
- Central Khonkaen (Plaza) (Renovate from Robinson department store)
- Central Udon (Renovate from Robinson department store)

=== Northern Thailand ===
- Central Chiangmai (Festival)
- Central Chiangmai Airport (Under renovation from Robinson department store)

=== Central Thailand ===
- Central Nakhon Sawan

=== Indonesia ===
- Grand Indonesia, Jakarta
Gallery

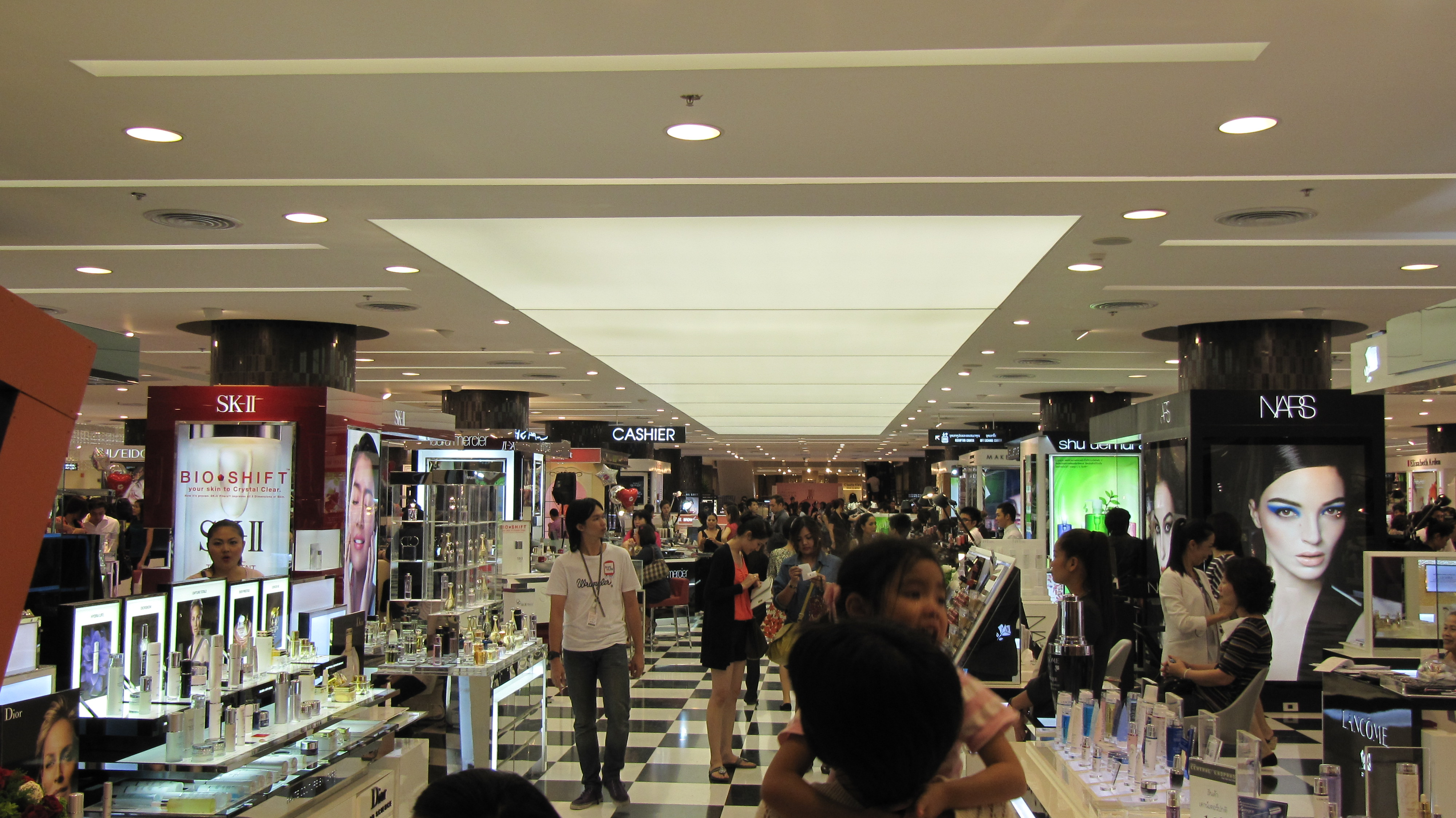
Cosmetics department, Ladprao branch.

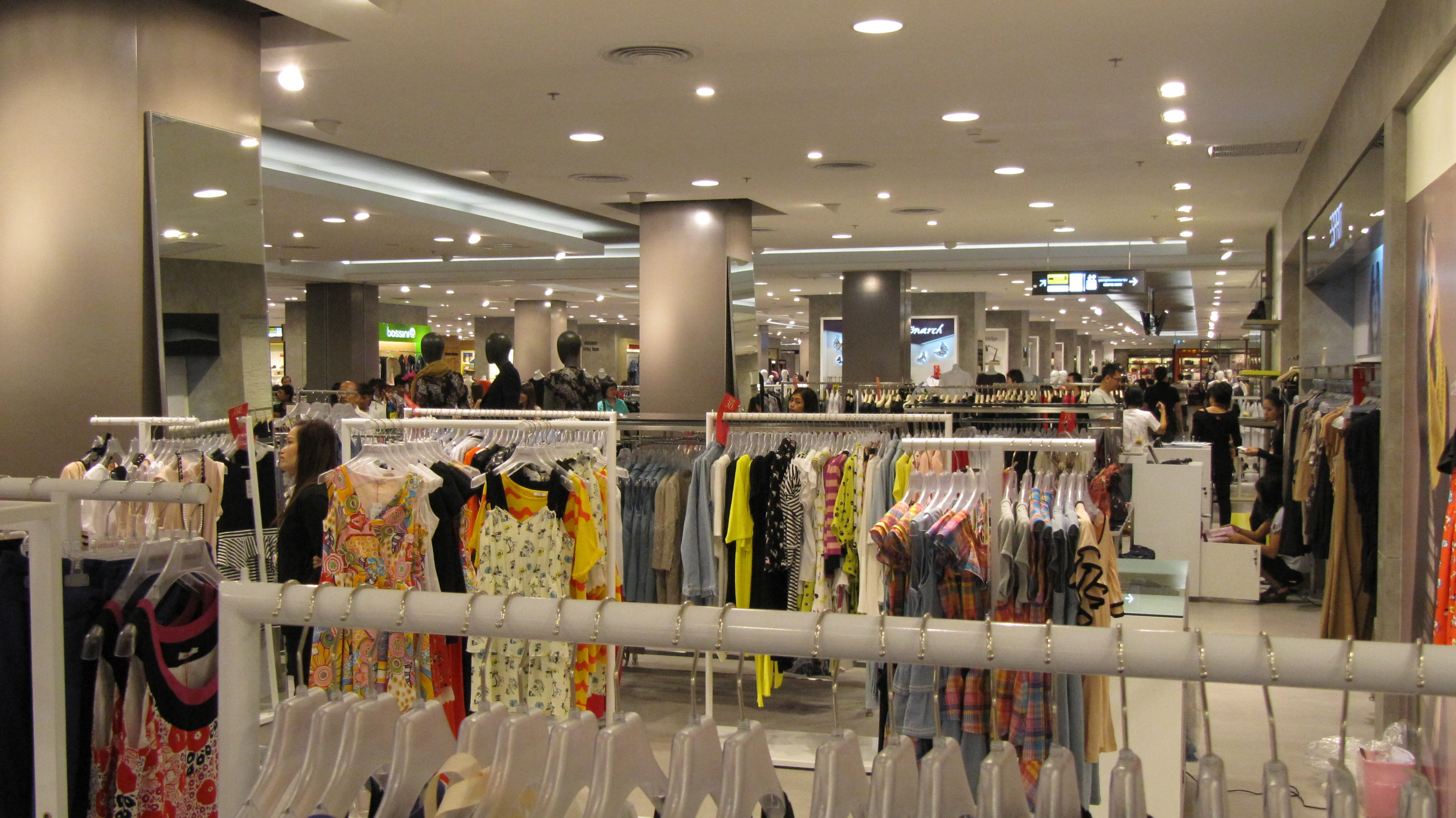
Clothing department, Ladprao branch.

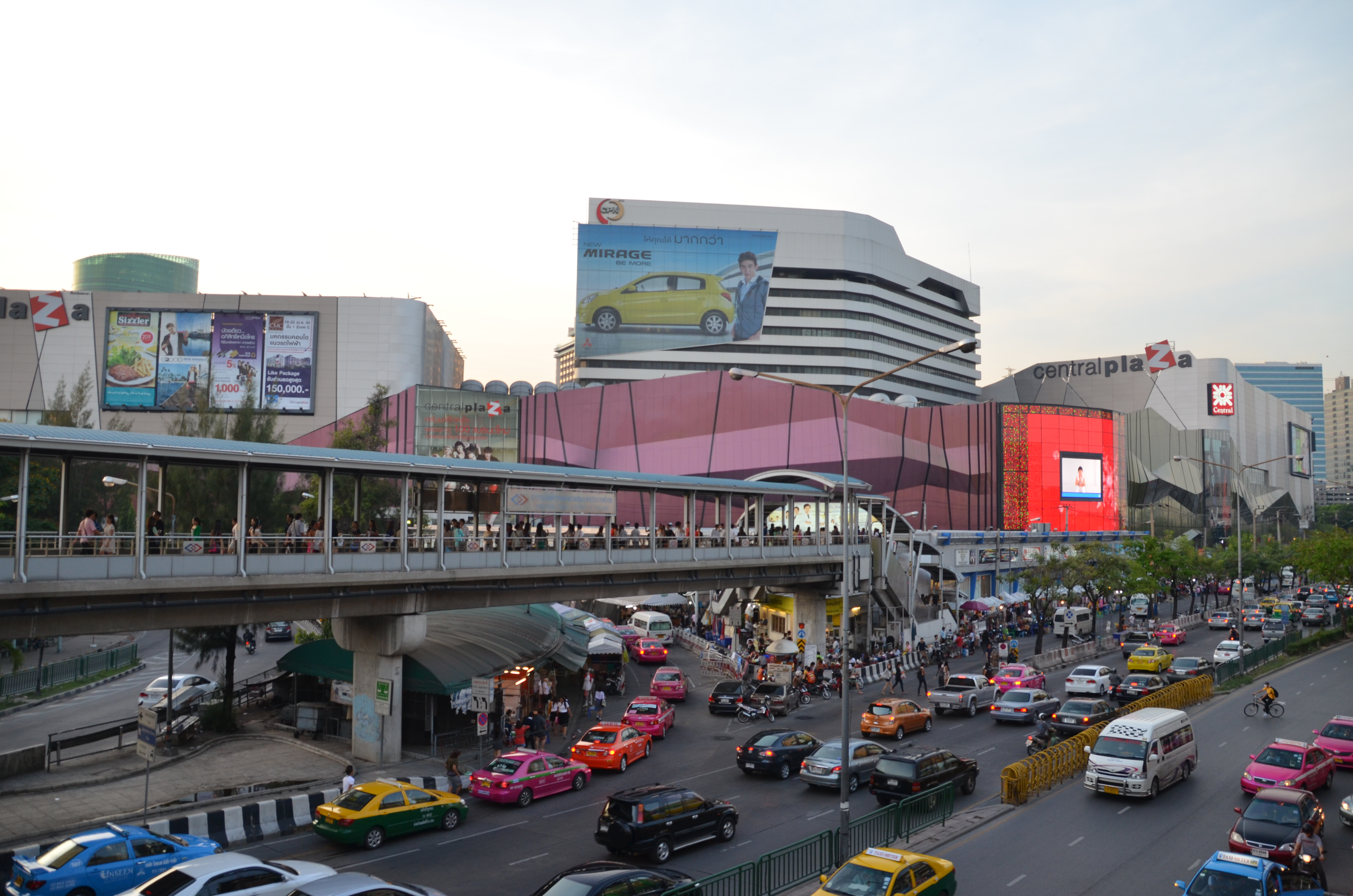
Central Ladprao branch.

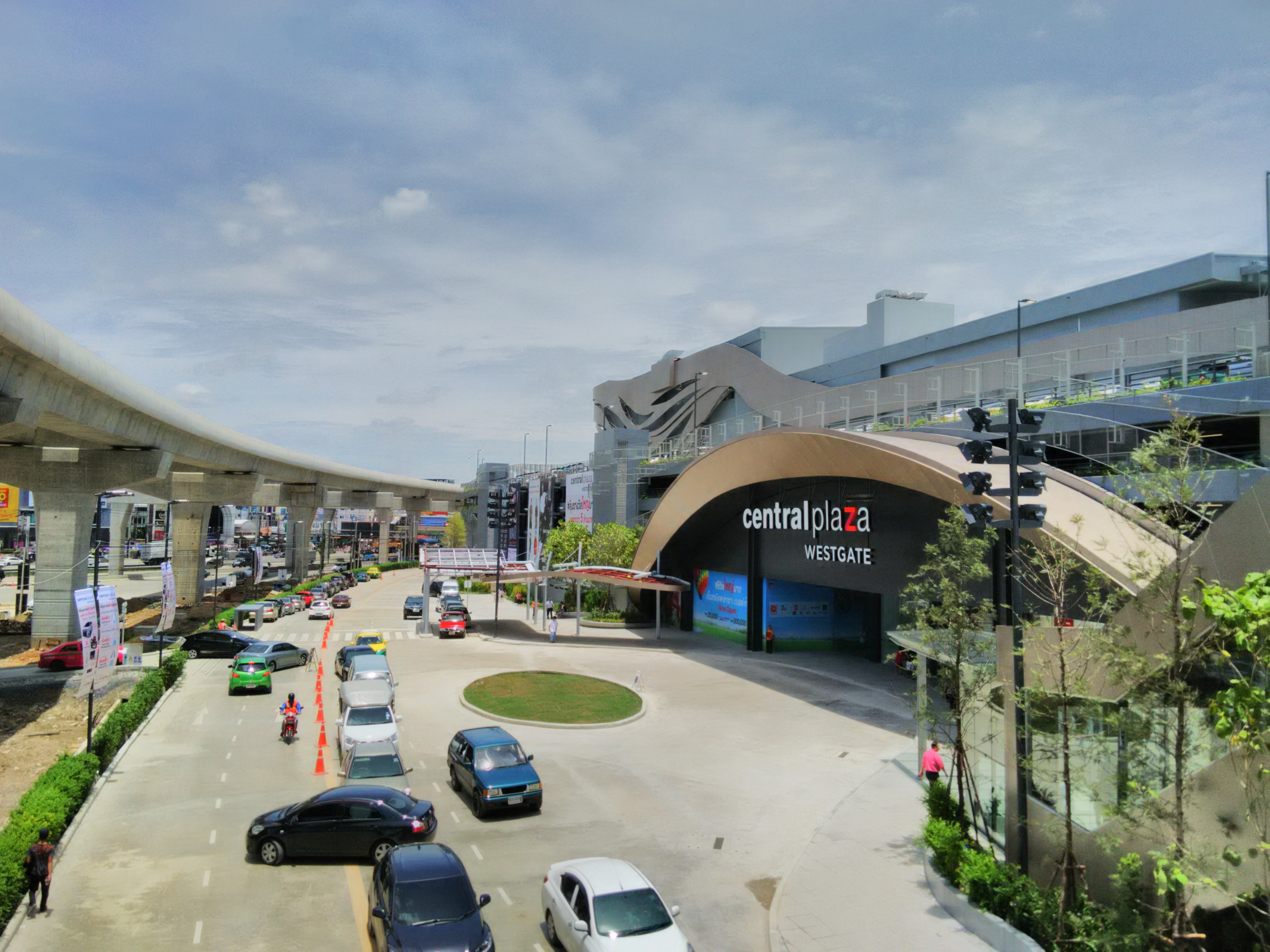
Central WestGate branch.

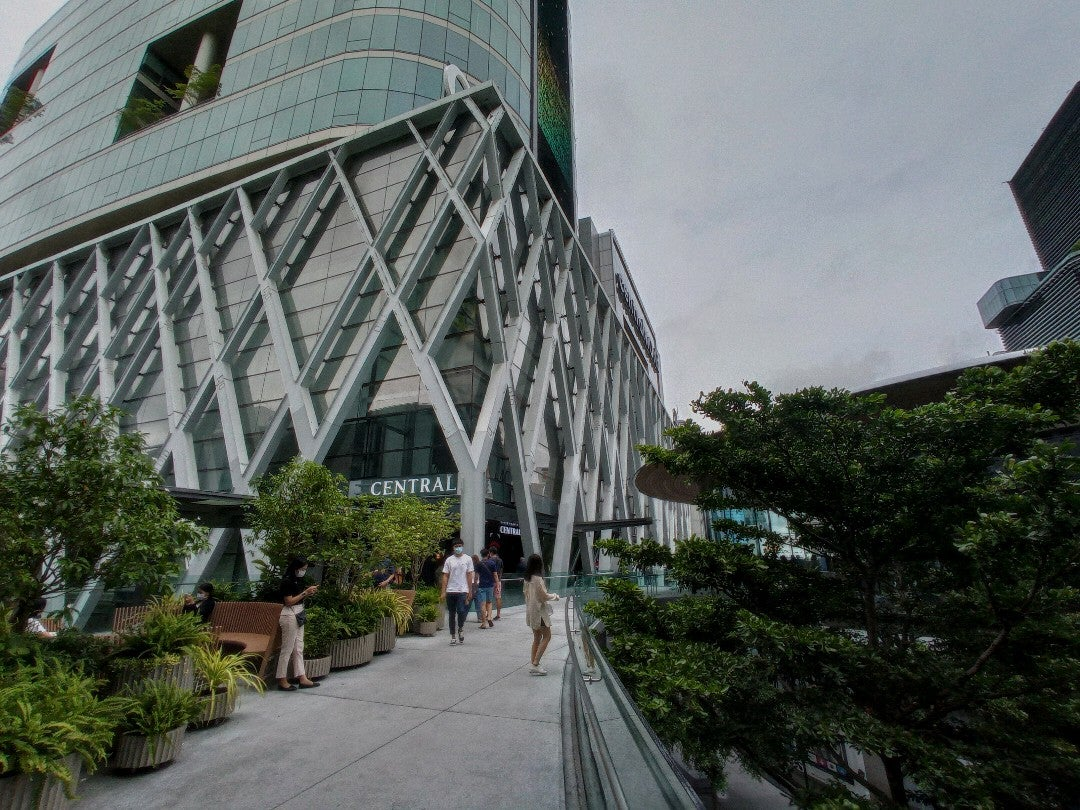
CentralWorld branch.

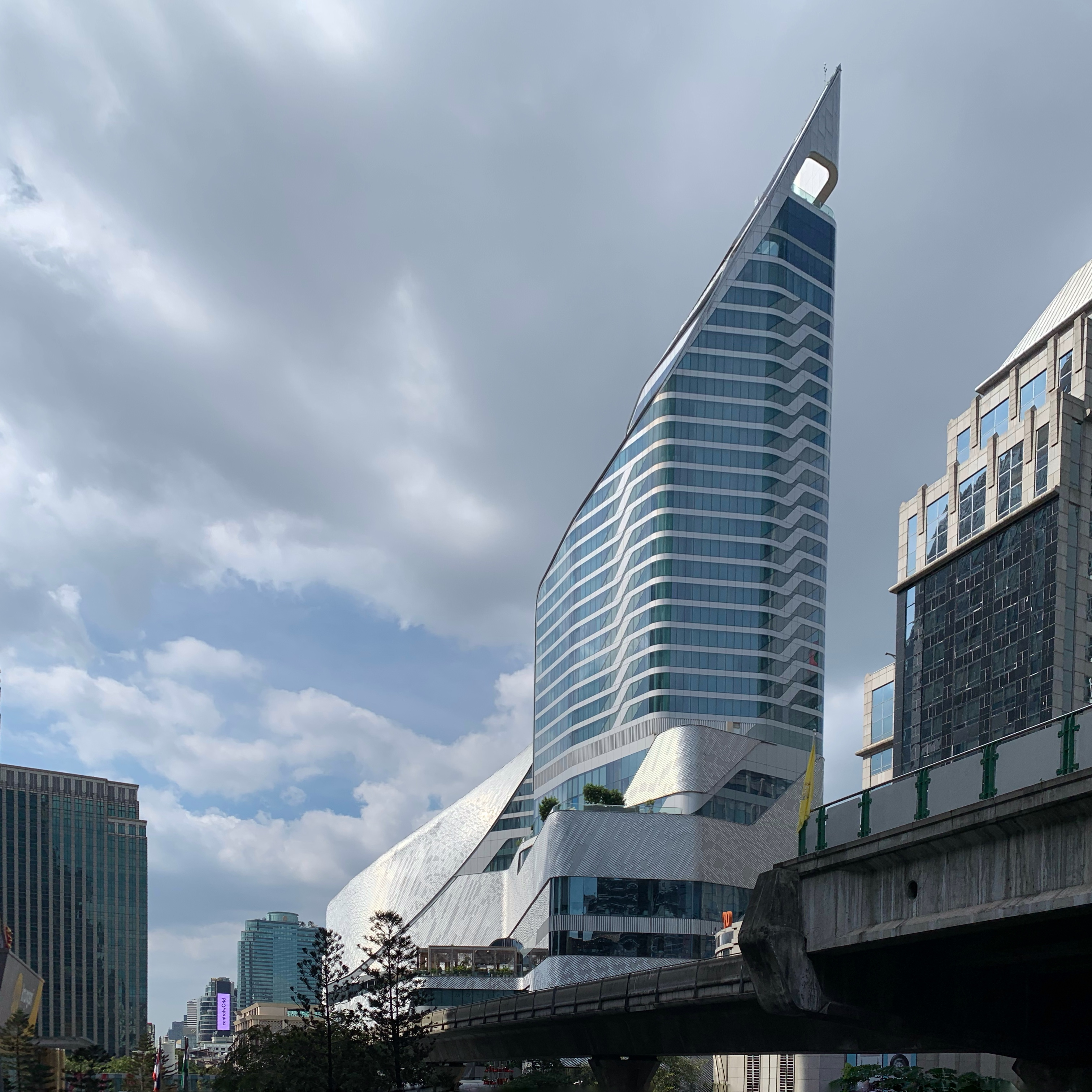
Central Embassy branch.

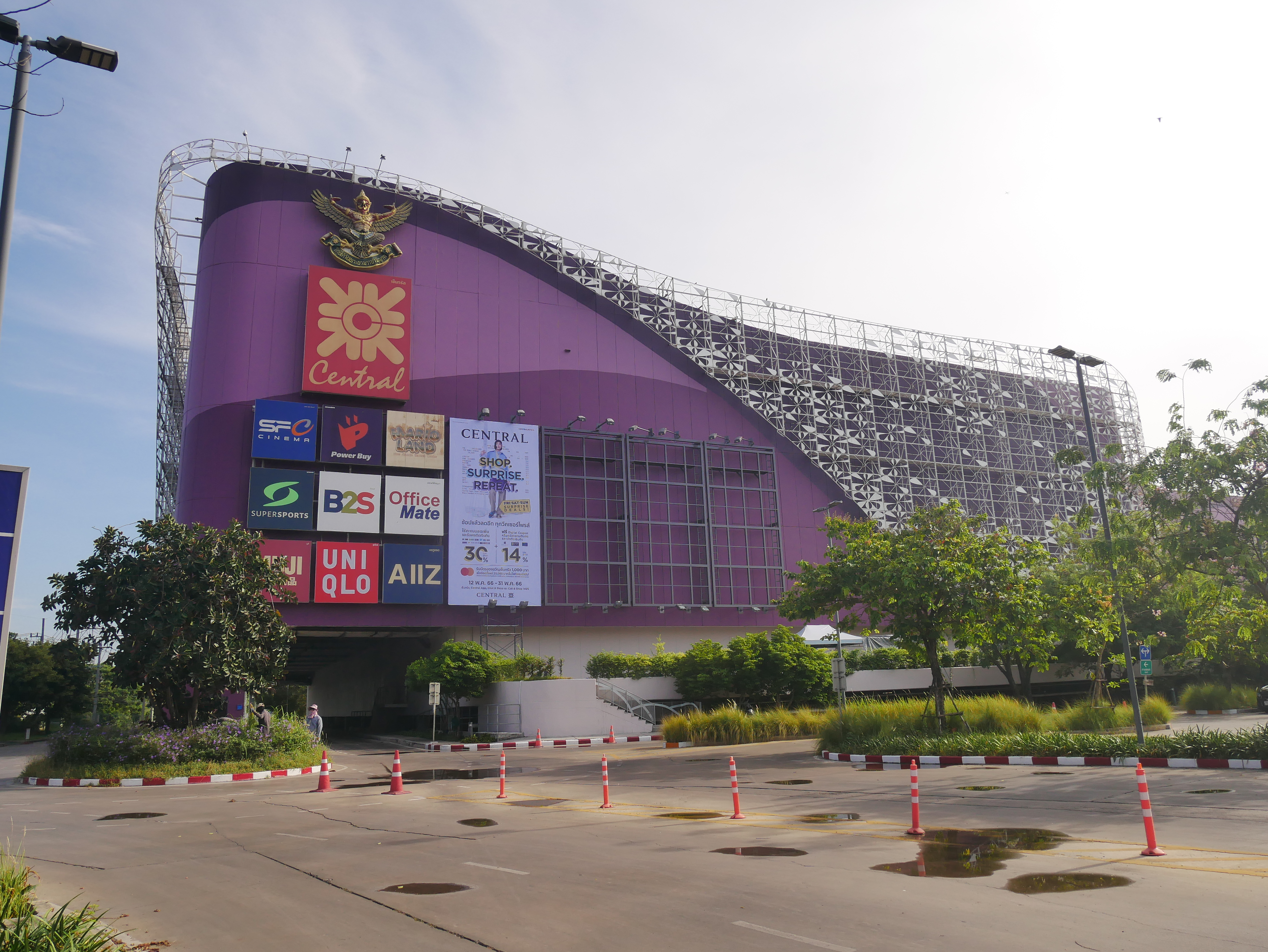
Central Salaya branch.

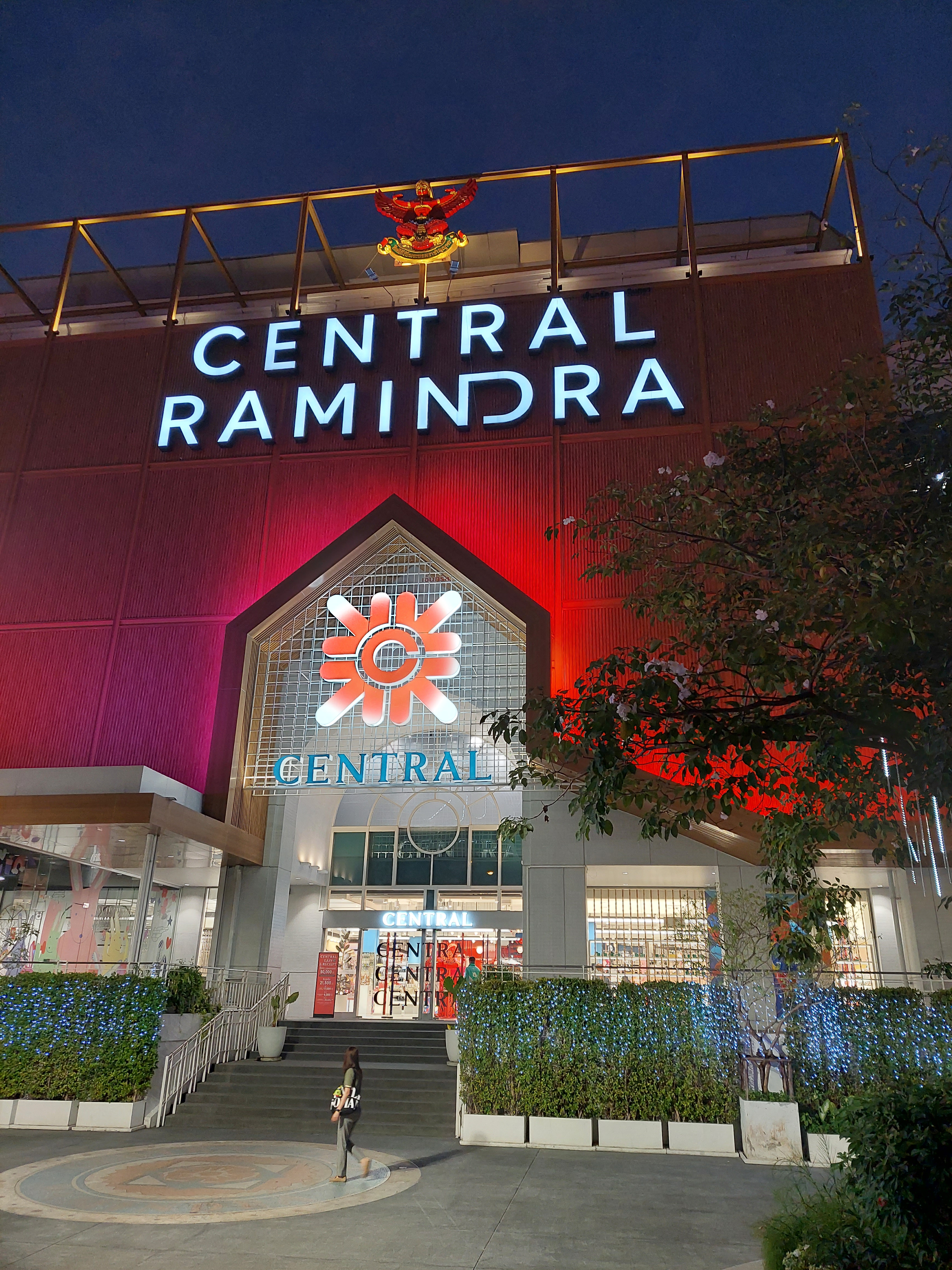
Central Ramindra branch.

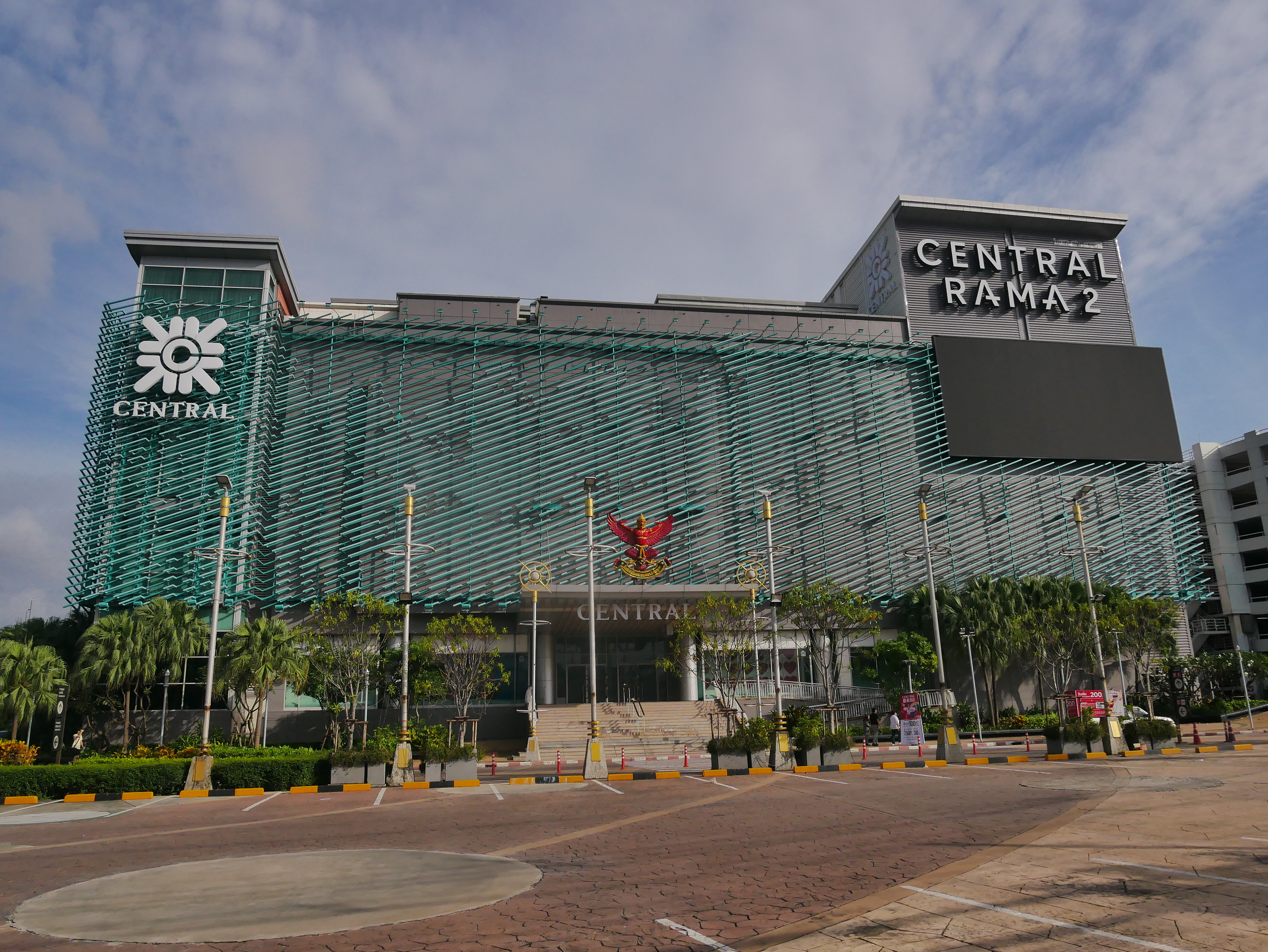
Central Rama 2 branch.

== See also ==
- Zen Department Store
- Robinson Department Store
- The Mall Department Store
- Robinson Lifestyle Center
- Central Pattana
