= Central Udon =

Central Udon เซ็นทรัล อุดร
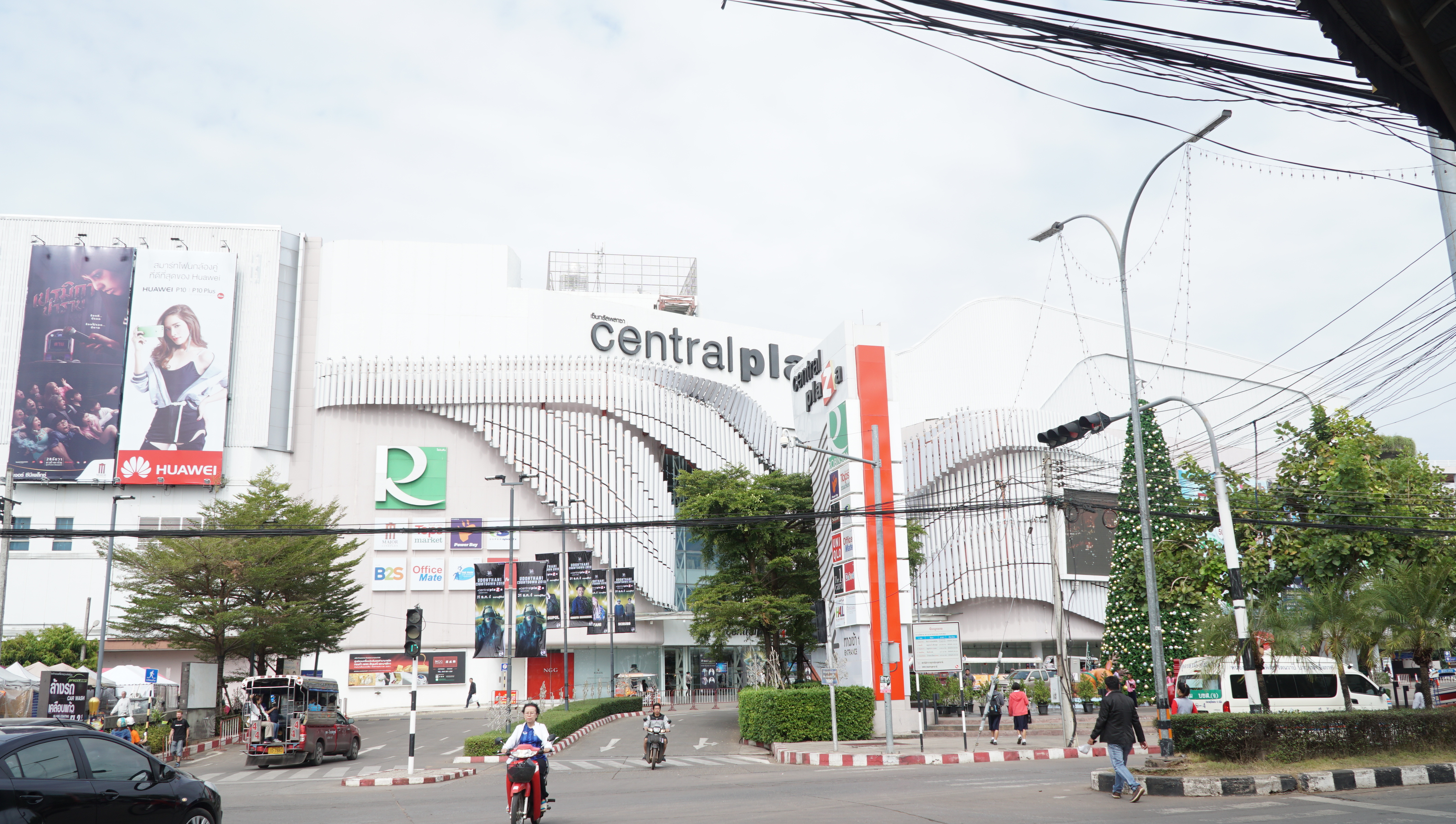
- Central Udon in 2017
- Location: 277/1-3,271/5 Prajaksillapakhom Road, Muang, Udon Thani 41000, Thailand
- Coordinates: 17.405827°N 102.79979°E
- Opened: 1994 (Charoensri Complex), April 8, 2009 (CentralPlaza Udon Thani)
- Developer: Central Pattana
- Manager: Taninrath Pakdeepinyotavee
- Owner: Central Pattana (April 8, 2009-Present); Udon Charoensri (1968) (1994- April 8, 2009)
- Num. of stores: 248
- Floor area: 85,000 m^{2} (910,000 sq ft) (Charoensri Complex); 250,000 m^{2} (2,700,000 sq ft) (Central Udon)
- Floors: 5 floors, 1 underground
- Parking: 2,000
- Website: www.centralplaza.co.th/udonthani/; www.central.co.th

Central Udon (Thai: เซ็นทรัล อุดร) (previously Charoensri Complex, CentralPlaza Udon Thani) is a shopping mall on Prajaksilapakom Road, Mueang Udon Thani District, Udon Thani. Central Pattana acquired the former Charoensri complex on 8 April 2009. Plans have been made to renovate and expand the complex on a 7-acre (28,000 m^{2}) land plot.

== History ==
The shopping mall was established as Charoensri Complex (Thai: เจริญศรีคอมเพล็กซ์) in 1994 by Udon Charoensri (1968) Ltd.

=== Mall renovations ===
CentralPlaza Udon Thani had a major mall renovation and expansion between October 2010 and 27 March 2012, had a grand opening on 10 May 2012. The shopping mall expansion includes new retailing area of 23,000 square metres (250,000 sq ft), new 5-floor parking building over 2,000 parking space and new multipurpose hall of 3,000 square metres (32,000 sq ft).

== Anchors ==
- Central The Store @ Udon Thani (2 October 2020 - Present , Renovate from Robinson department store)
- Tops
- Major Cineplex 8 Cinemas
- B2S
- Officemate
- Power Buy
- Supersports
- Sport World
- Food Park
- Yoyo Land (First branch in Northeast)
- Fitness First
- Udon Hall
- Centara Hotel & Convention centre Udonthani (Previously : Charoensri Grand Royal Hotel)
- Muji (First 2-floors store)

=== Previously anchor ===
- Robinson department store (First branch in upcountry , 30 August 1995 - September 2020)
- Fun Planet
- The Rink ice arena
- Major Bowl Hit (Closed in April 2019)

== See also ==
- List of shopping malls in Thailand
