= 2010 Thailand Five's =

Tournament details
- Host country: Thailand
- City: Udon thani
- Dates: 8–11 April 2010
- Teams: 4 (from 2 confederations)
- Venue(s): 1 (in 1 host city)

Final positions
- Champions: Iran
- Runners-up: Uzbekistan
- Third place: Argentina; Thailand

Tournament statistics
- Matches played: 6
- Goals scored: 30 (5 per match)
- Best player(s): (Iran) Masoud Daneshvar

The 2010 Thailand Five's (Thai:ฟุตซอลสี่เส้า ไทยแลนด์ ไฟว์ 2010) is an international futsal competition. It was organized by the Football Association of Thailand or the FAT. The tournament is set to be a round-robin format with all matches being held at the CentralPlaza Udon Thani in Udon thani, Thailand on 8 to 11 April 2010.

This edition will feature the host Thailand and three invited teams. The three teams that have been invited are Iran, Argentina and Uzbekistan.

== Participant teams ==
The 2010 Thailand Five's is following 4 teams include

Team	Association	Confederation	FIFA Ranking
Team	Association	Confederation	8 April 2010
Thailand (Host)	FA Thailand	AFC	10 (3)
Iran	FF IR.Iran	AFC	5 (1)
Argentina	Argentine FA	CONMEBOL	7 (2)
Uzbekistan	Uzbekistan FF	AFC	18 (4)

== Venue ==
The matches are played at the CentralPlaza Udon Thani in Udon thani.

Udon Thani	Udon Thani
Udon Thani	CentralPlaza Udon Thani
Udon Thani	Capacity:
2010 Thailand Five's (Thailand)	

== Ranking ==
Pos	Team	Pld	W	D	L	GF	GA	GD	Pts	Final result
1	Iran	3	3	0	0	9	5	+4	9	Champions
2	Uzbekistan	3	1	0	2	7	7	0	3	Runners-up
3	Argentina	3	1	0	2	7	9	−2	3	Third place
4	Thailand (H)	3	1	0	2	7	9	−2	3	Third place

(H) Hosts

== Results ==
- All times are Thailand Standard Time (UTC+07:00).

=== Day 1 ===
8 April 2010
17:00

Thailand	1–4	Argentina
Akkapol Klomkliang 37'	Report	Aviglia Ignacio 3'; Esteban Ezequiel Arellano 22'; Mosenson Guido 26'; Pablo Esteban Belsito 39'

CentralPlaza Udon Thani, Udon thani
Attendance: 2,500
Referee: Kaveepol Kamawitee (Thailand)

8 April 2010
19:30

Uzbekistan	1–2	Iran
Yunusiv Artur 16'	Report	Mohammad Keshavarz 3'; Masoud Daneshvar 9'

CentralPlaza Udon Thani, Udon thani
Referee: Praser Krutsri (Thailand)

=== Day 2 ===
9 April 2010
17:00

Thailand	3–4	Iran
Suphawut Thueanklang 4'; Sermphan Khumthinkaew 6'; Tanakorn Santanaprasit 32'	Report	Mohammad Taheri 4'; Masoud Daneshvar 13', 26'; Lertchai Issarasuwipakorn 22' (o.g.)

CentralPlaza Udon Thani, Udon thani
Attendance: 3,000
Referee: Prasert Krutsri (Thailand)

9 April 2010
19:30

Argentina	2–5	Uzbekistan
	Report

CentralPlaza Udon Thani, Udon thani

=== Day 3 ===
10 April 2010
16:00

Iran	3–1	Argentina
Mohammad Hashemzadeh 21'; Mohammad Taheri 36'; Javad Asghari Moghaddam 37'	Report	Esteban Ezequiel Arellano 18'

CentralPlaza Udon Thani, Udon thani
Attendance: 3,000
Referee: Kaveepol Kamawitee (Thailand)

10 April 2010
18:30

Thailand	3–1	Uzbekistan
	Report

CentralPlaza Udon Thani, Udon thani
