= Central WestGate =

Shopping mall in Nonthaburi, Thailand

Central WestGate เซ็นทรัล เวสต์เกต
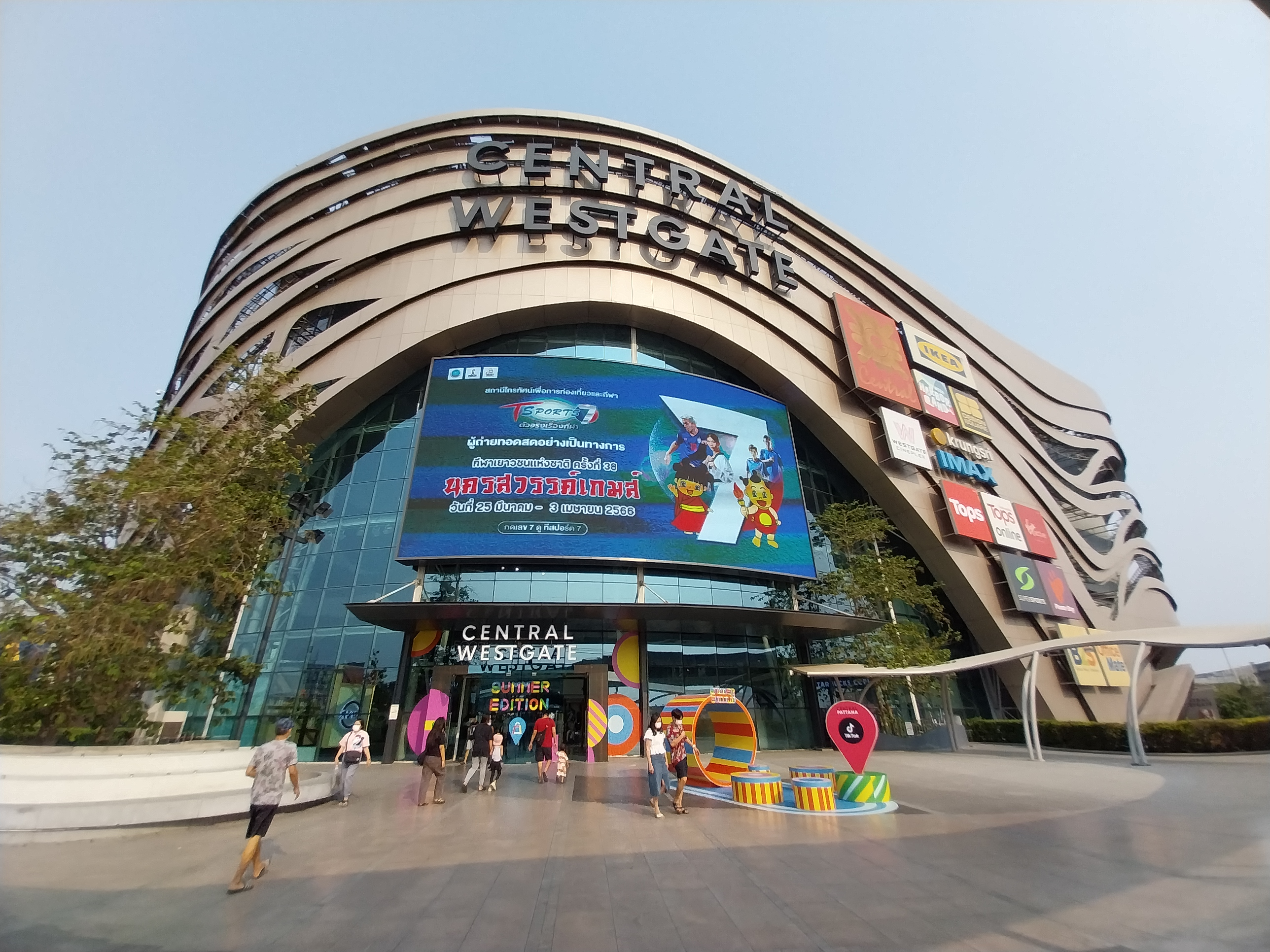
- Location: Bang Yai, Nonthaburi, Thailand 11010
- Coordinates: 13°52′37″N 100°24′42″E
- Address: 199, 199/1, 199/2, Mu 6, Sao Thong Hin
- Opened: 28 August 2015 (Central Westgate); 15 March 2018 (IKEA)
- Developer: Central Pattana
- Manager: Patcharin Apirukworawut
- Owner: Central Pattana
- Num. of stores: 1000+
- Floor area: 550,278 m^{2} (5,923,140 sq ft)
- Floors: 6
- Parking: 7,000
- Public transit: Talad Bang Yai MRT station
- Website: www.centralwestgate.com

Central WestGate (Thai: เซ็นทรัล เวสต์เกต; previously known as CentralPlaza WestGate Bangyai or เซ็นทรัลพลาซ่า เวสต์เกต บางใหญ่) is a large shopping mall in Bang Yai district, Nonthaburi province, Thailand. The complex, which includes cinemas and stores, is owned by Central Pattana. The mall, located at Bangyai Intersection, opened in August 2015. It has a gross floor area of 550,278 m^{2} (5,923,140 sq ft) which includes the IKEA store which has a floor area of 50,278 m^{2} (541,190 sq ft).

It is served by Talad Bang Yai MRT station on the Purple Line.

== Anchors ==
- Central The Store @ Westgate
  - Tops
    - Tops Daily
  - Power Buy
  - Supersports
  - B2S
  - OfficeMate
- Food Patio (Old Foodpark)
- IKEA
- SB Design Square
- Nitori
- Don Don Donki
- Fitness Center "Virgin Active"
- Indoor Amusement Park "Mega Harborland Westgate"
- WestGate Hall
- WestGate Cineplex 12 Cinemas
  - "Laserplex" 7 cinemas
  - "VIP Cinema" 1 cinema
  - "IMAX with Laser" 1 cinema
  - "4DX" 1 cinema
  - "3D Sound" 1 cinema
  - "Kids Cinema" 1 cinema
- Auto1

== See also ==
- List of largest shopping malls in Thailand
- List of shopping malls in Bangkok
- List of shopping malls in Thailand
- List of the world's largest shopping malls
