= Central Salaya =

- Location: Borommaratchachonnani Road, Bang Toei, Sam Phran, Nakhon Pathom
- Coordinates: 13.786693°N 100.27583°E
- Opened: August 12, 2014
- Developer: Central Pattana
- Manager: Central Pattana
- Owner: Central Pattana
- Num. of stores: 250+
- Floor area: 185,500 m^{2}

Central Salaya (previously known as CentralPlaza Salaya) is a shopping plaza and department store in Sam Phran District, Nakhon Pathom Province, on the western outskirts of Bangkok, Thailand.

== Description ==
The mall launched on August 12, 2014. It can be considered as a branch of Central Pattana that supports customers in the western Bangkok metropolitan area. It lines on Borommaratchachonnani Road between Phutthamonthon Sai 5 and Phutthamonthon Sai 7 Roads, with a total area of 70 rai (110,000 m^{2}).

The mall building is designed in a "Contemporary Botanical" (modern botanical garden) concept. The interior architecture is designed by replicating the patterns of attractions in Nakhon Pathom Province, such as Sanam Chandra Palace, or traditional waterfront pavilion. The external structure is white orchid-shaped wrought iron, symbol of Nakhon Pathom Province.

It has more than 250 stores.

== Anchors ==
- Central The Store @ Salaya
- Tops (2020–Present, Renovate from Tops Superstore)
- Power Buy
- B2S
- Supersports
- OfficeMate
- Food Patio (2023–Present, Renovate from Food Park)
- Uniqlo
- SF Cinema 7 Cinemas

=== Previously anchor ===
- Tops Superstore (First branch in Salaya, August 12, 2014 – 2020)
- Food Park (August 12, 2014 – December 20, 2023)
- Salaya Market

== Transportation ==
- BMTA bus: routes 515 (4-61) (Victory Monument–Central Salaya), 4-70E (Mo Chit BTS Station–Central Salaya)
