= Central Pinklao =

Central Pinklao เซ็นทรัล ปิ่นเกล้า
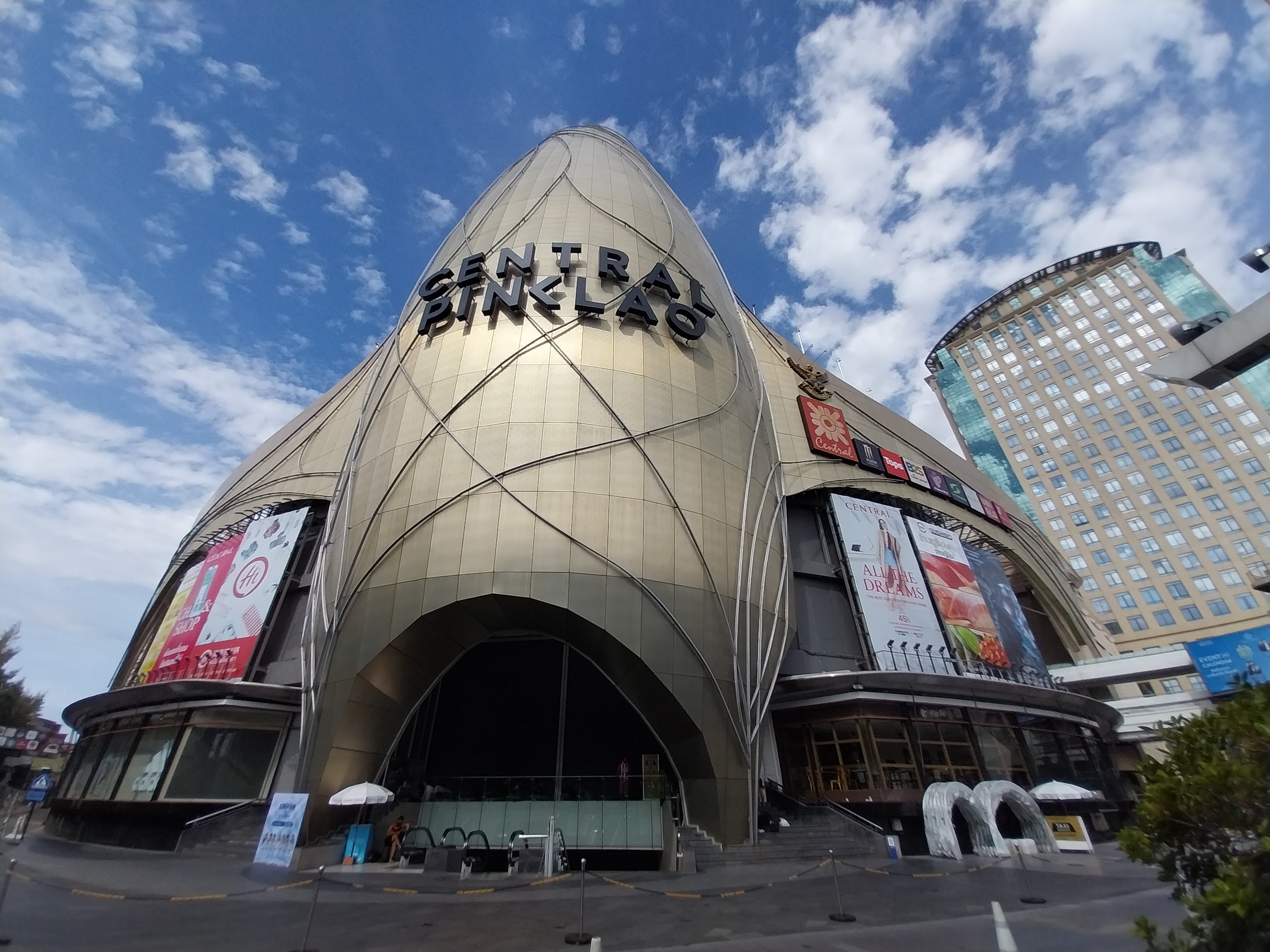
- Central Pinklao in 2023
- Location: Bangkok Noi, Bangkok, Thailand
- Coordinates: 13.7785°N 100.4766°E
- Address: 7/222 Borommaratchachonanni Road, Arun Amarin
- Opened: March 31, 1995
- Developer: Central Pattana
- Manager: Visit Udomkitchote
- Owner: Central Pattana
- Num. of stores: 263
- Floor area: 60,098 square metres (646,890 sq ft)
- Floors: 6 (Excludes 22 floors for Office Tower A and 15 floors for Office Tower B)
- Parking: 3,500
- Website: web.archive.org/web/20101215061635/http://centralplaza.co.th/

Central Pinklao (previously known as CentralPlaza Pinklao) is a shopping mall on Borommaratchachonnani Road in Bangkok Noi district, Bangkok, Thailand. The nearest train station is Bang Yi Khan MRT station.

== Overview and floors ==
The shopping mall has a total of six floors with a basement floor included.

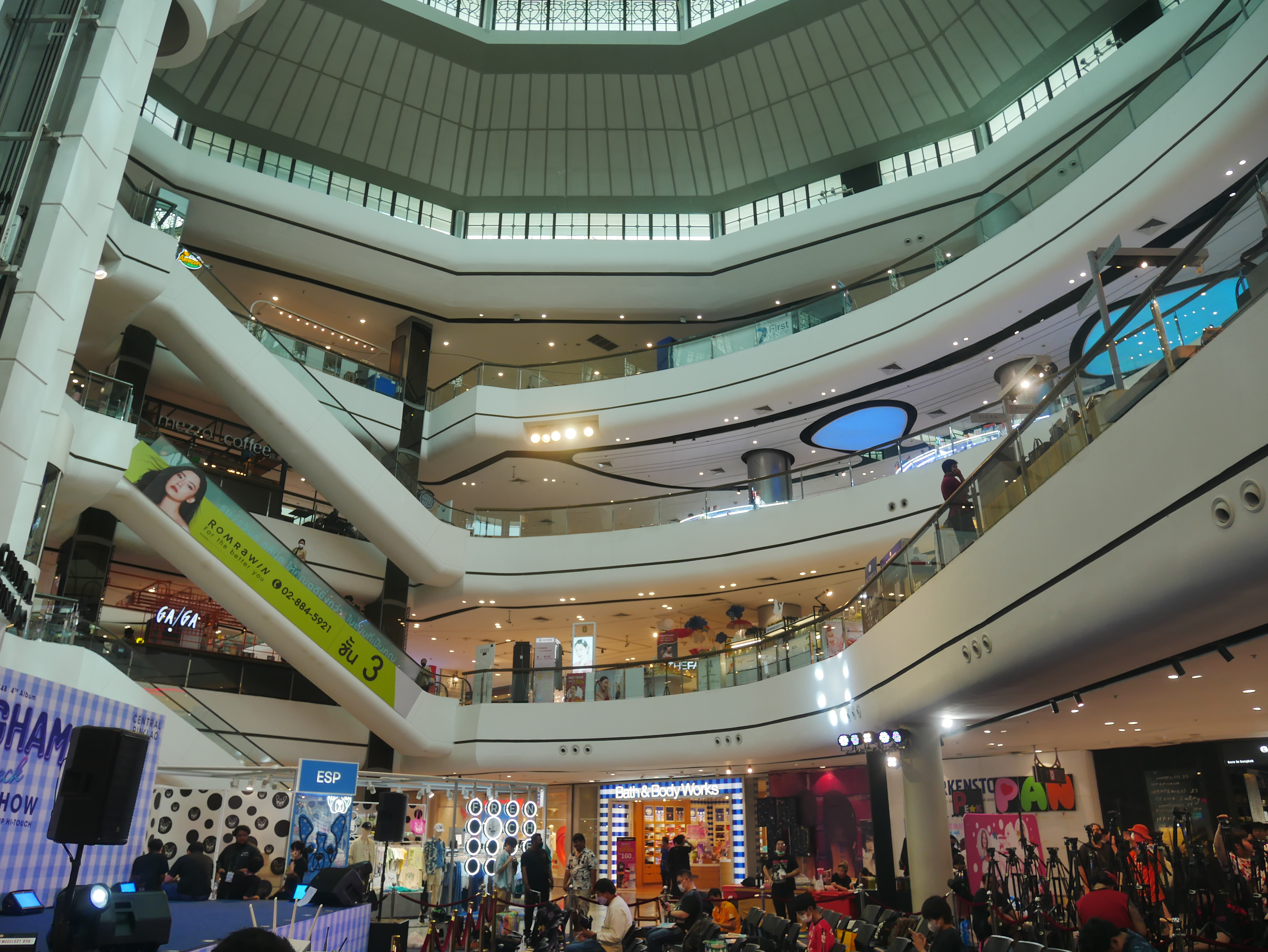
Interior of Mall

== Anchors ==
- Central The Store @ Pinklao
- Tops Food Hall
  - Tops Daily (Old FamilyMart)
- Major Central Pinklao 7 Cinemas (Old EGV Central Pinklao, Major Cineplex)
  - "Laserplex" 5 Cinemas
  - "IMAX with Laser" 1 Cinema
  - "Kids Cinema" 1 Cinema
- Don Don Donki
- B2S (Old B2S Think Space)
- Officemate
- Supersports
- Power Buy
- Food Patio (Old Food Park)
- Fitness First

=== Previously anchor ===
- Food Park
- SB Design Square Central Pinklao

== See also ==
- List of shopping malls in Thailand
