= Central Ramindra =

Shopping mall in Bangkok, Thailand

Central Ramindra เซ็นทรัล รามอินทรา
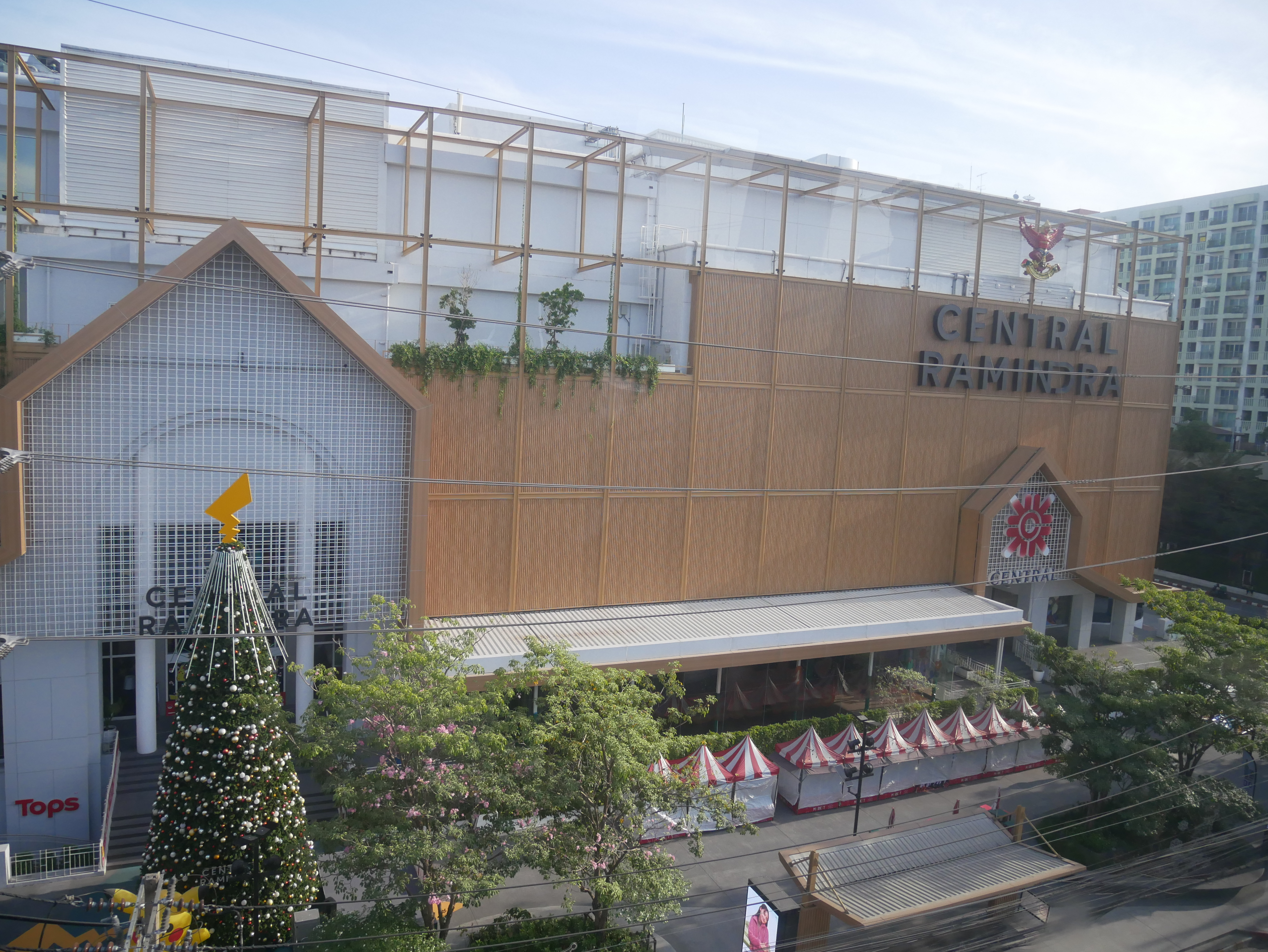
- Location: 109/9, Mu 3, Ram Intra Rd., Anusawari, Bang Khen, Bangkok 10220, Thailand
- Coordinates: 13.872283°N 100.602004°E
- Opened: November 1993 (renovated in 2006,2023)
- Developer: Central Pattana
- Manager: Wanphen Kawbuakaew
- Owner: Central Pattana
- Num. of stores: 80
- Num. of anchor tenants: 5
- Floor area: 17,156 square metres (184,670 sq ft)
- Floors: 6
- Website: www.centralplaza.co.th

Central Ramindra is a shopping center on Ram Intra Road in the Bang Khen District of Bangkok, Thailand. It is the second shopping center of Central Pattana.

It was served by Ram Inthra 3 MRT station since 21 November 2023.

== Overview ==
This shopping center has a five floors and is built as a community concept. It contains a Central Department Store, retail outlets, restaurants and a six-screen cinema. There is a variety of family-oriented activities.

== Anchors ==
- Central The Store @ Ramindra
- Tops
- SF Cinema 6 Cinemas
- B2S
- Supersports
- Power Buy
- Food Patio

== Parking ==
The shopping center has a parking space for 1000 cars.

== See also ==
- List of shopping malls in Thailand
