= Major Cineplex =

Thai movie theater operator

Major Cineplex Group
- Type: Public
- Traded as: SET: MAJOR
- ISIN: TH0671010R16; TH0671010Z08; TH0671010Z16
- Industry: Movie theaters Bowling alleys Ice skating rinks Karaoke, Real estate
- Founded: 1994; 32 years ago
- Headquarters: Chatuchak, Bangkok, Thailand
- Key people: Vicha Poolvaraluck, chairman Kittsanan Ngamphathipong, chief executive Wichai Poolworaluk, chief executive, EGV Entertainment; Arthorn Techatantiwong, deputy managing director, bowling Aorrawan Kowathana, deputy managing director, service operations
- Revenue: 5,767.08 million baht
- Net income: 626.36 million baht
- Subsidiaries: Bangkok IMAX Theater Co. Ltd. EGV Entertainment Public Co. Ltd. Major Cineplex Property Co. Ltd. Major Cineplex Service Co. Ltd. Paragon Cineplex; Major Platinum Cineplex (Laos) Co., Ltd. Cineplex (Laos) Sole Co., Ltd.
- Website: www.majorcineplex.com

Major Cineplex Group Public Co. Ltd. is the largest operator of movie theaters in Thailand, and Laos. Combined with its subsidiary, EGV Entertainment, the company has 838 screens in 180 locations around Thailand and Laos. Among its properties is Thailand's largest multiplex, the Major Rangsit, and Esplanade Cineplex Nganwongwan-Khaerai, with 16 screens and 5,000 seats. The second-largest chain in Thailand is SF Group.

== History ==
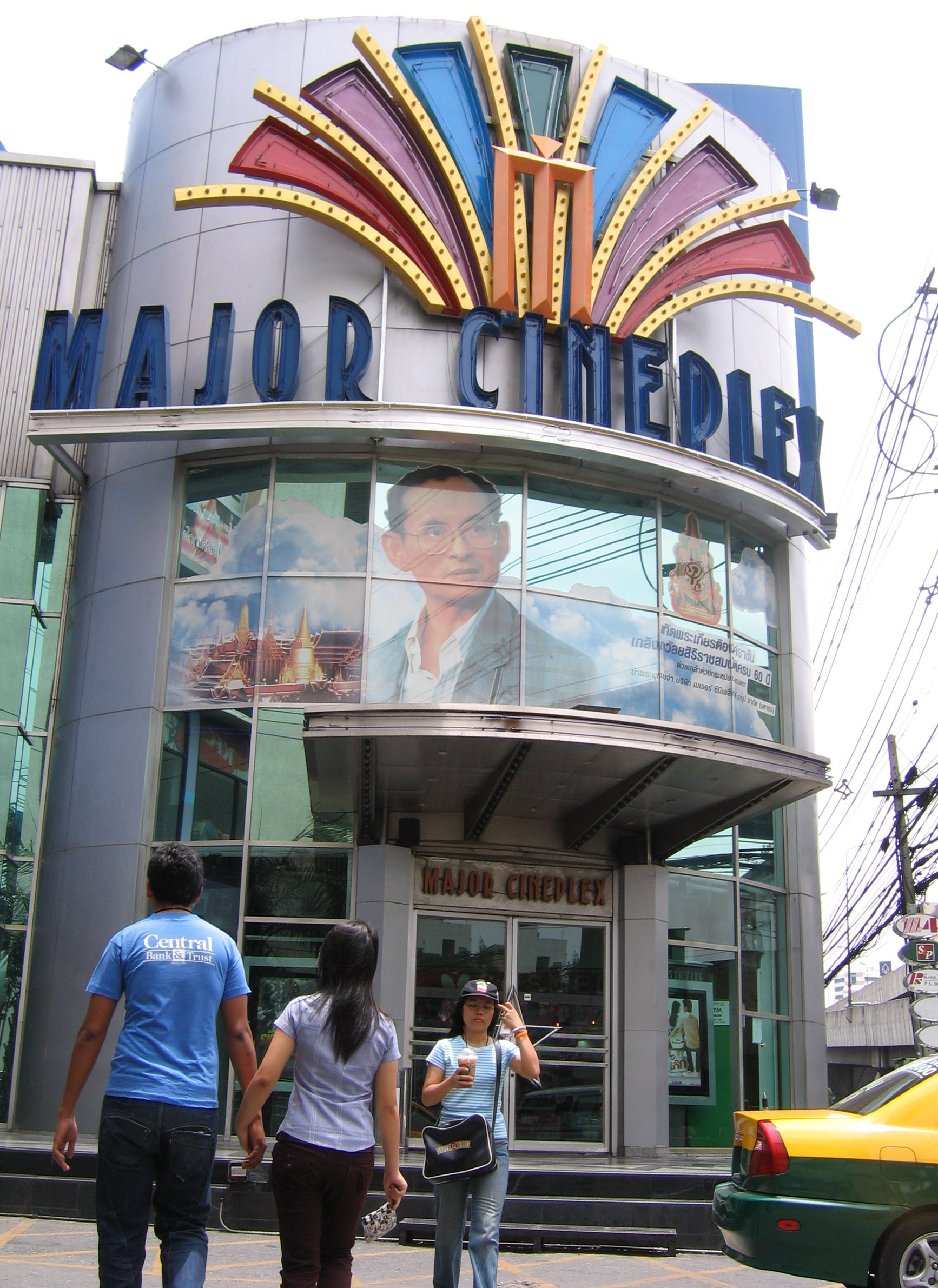
One of Major Cineplex's first stand-alone multiplex branches, Major Cineplex Ramkamheang.

Major Cineplex was founded by Vicha Poolvaraluk (or Poolvaraluck) in 1994. A member of a family with roots in the movie business (the family was involved in film studios as well as several single-screen theaters), Vicha started out in property development.

In 1992, he was asked by his father, Charoen Poolvaraluck, to take over the movie theater business. Vicha decided on a concept of large movie complexes that could offer a range of entertainment services, including not only movies, but also bowling alleys, karaoke rooms, restaurants and shopping. The first such complex opened in 1996 on Borommaratchachonnani Road (Pinklao-Nakhon Chaisri Road) in Pinklao, Bangkok. The 14-screen, 4,000-seat Major Cineplex Ratchayothin opened in 1998 and featured Thailand's first IMAX cinema. It was the company's flagship cinema complex until 2006, when Paragon Cineplex opened. Other early Major Cineplex theaters include branches at Ramkamheang and Sukhumvit.

In 2004, Major Cineplex absorbed Thailand's No 2 theater operator, EGV Entertainment, which was Thailand's first cineplex operator. EGV had been owned by a rival branch of the Poolvaraluck family, headed by Vicha Poolvaraluck's cousin, Wichai Poolvaraluck, who started EGV as a partnership with Golden Village.

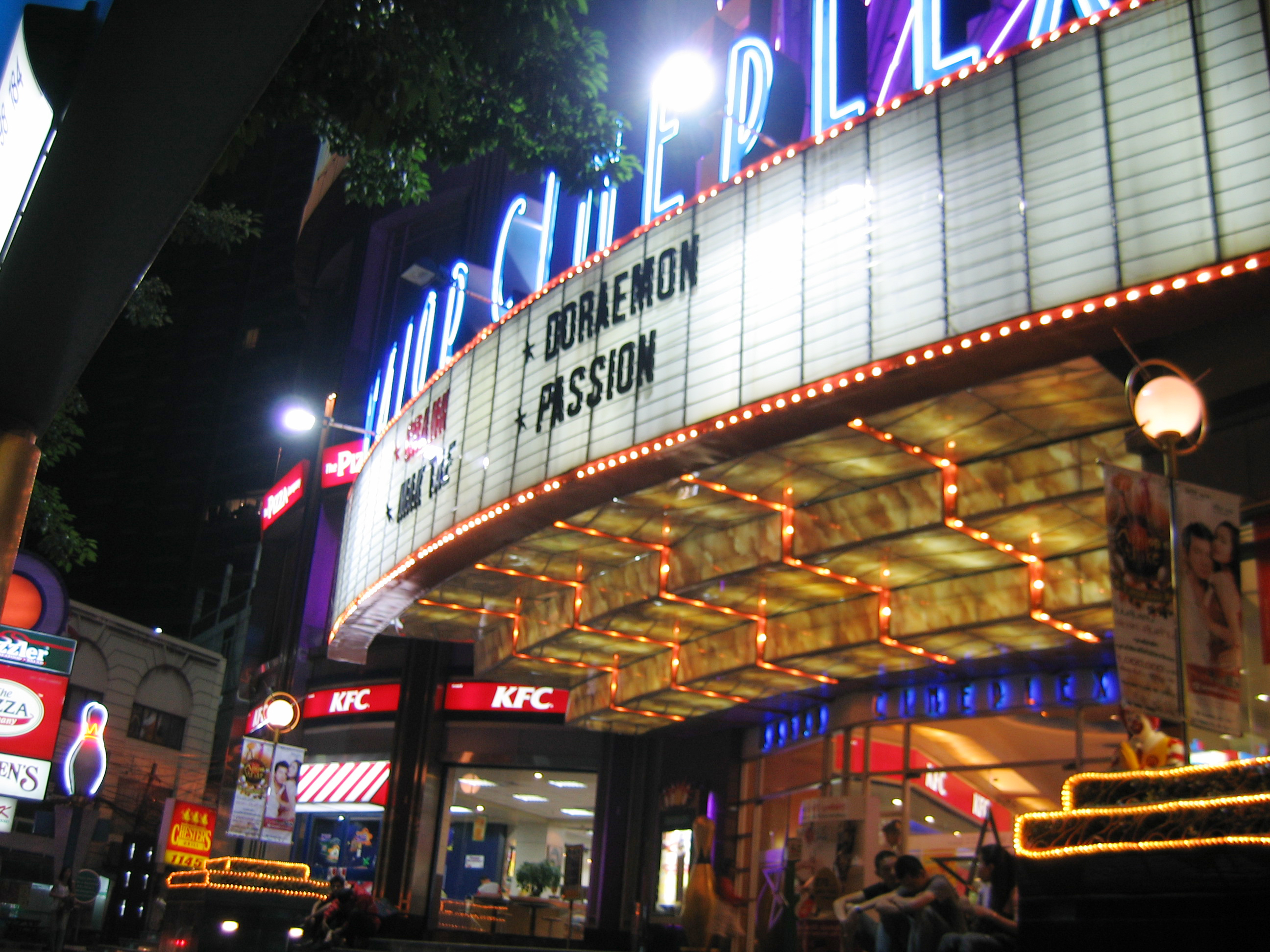
Major Cineplex Sukhumvit, a stand-alone cinema complex, with a bowling alley, karaoke, restaurants and small shops.

== Theaters ==
=== Major Cineplex ===
There are at least 19 Major Cineplex-branded theaters in Thailand, with the number expected to grow in the coming years. The company aims to increase its total number of screens to 500 (including EGV cinemas) by 2012. Major Cineplex's theaters range from shopping complexes, anchored by the cineplex, such as Major Cineplex Ratchayothin or Major Cineplex Sukhumvit, that include bowling alleys, fitness centers, restaurants and shops, to multiplexes that are part of larger shopping malls, such as the Bang Na or Rama III branches in Bangkok.

At the theaters themselves, there is a range of seating choices, including the luxury "Emperor" class, which is similar to EGV's "Gold Class" (see below), and "Opera", which provides a sofa-like seat, designed for couples.

In December 2006, the company debuted another flagship brand, the Esplanade Cineplex, consisting of 13 theaters and a 26-lane bowling alley at the Esplanade complex on Ratchadaphisek Road in Bangkok's Din Daeng district.

Originally, Major Cineplex operated six branches with a total of 35 screens in Cambodia. This included one IMAX theater, which relocated from the Hat Yai Cineplex branch in 2018, and one Screen X theater, which boasted the largest main screen in Southeast Asia. However, the Thai-Cambodian border crisis of 2025-2026 led to a boycott of Thai services and products, as well as a ban on importing Thai films, causing business to decline. Ultimately, Major Cineplex sold its entire business to a local investment group to permanently withdraw its investment from Cambodia, before announcing its closure on February 28, 2026. Major Cineplex also granted the new owner the right to use the brand as a franchise for a limited period.

=== EGV/Major Cinema ===
Old EGV's logo primary used in 2006-2025.

Thailand's first cineplex operator, EGV or Entertain Golden Village, was formed in 1993 by Wichai Poolworaluk's Entertain Theatres Network as a joint venture with Hong Kong's Golden Harvest and Australia's Village Roadshow (which formed Golden Village).

The first cineplex was opened in 1994 at Future Park Bangkae (present-day Seacon Bangkae). Other branches include the Grand EGV in Siam Discovery (opposite Siam Square) and the EGV Metropolis, which anchors a Big C shopping center on Ratchadamri Road in Pathum Wan district, Bangkok opposite CentralWorld.

Village Roadshow took over Golden Harvest's stake in 2000, and in 2002, Wichai bought out Village Roadshow's 50% interest. The company then merged with Major Cineplex in 2004, putting aside a rivalry within the Poolvaraluck family.

In 2019, Major Cineplex has replaced the former EGV brand with Major Cinema, which has been used to rebrand EGV branches.

==== EGV's theaters ====
Aside from its EGV-branded multiplexes, EGV has the following:

- Gold Class – Smaller theaters, located on existing EGV properties, with their own box offices. The screening rooms have around 50 seats, with heavily padded reclining chairs and valet food-and-drink service. Blankets, pillows and foot-warming stockings are provided. EGV was the pioneer in this concept of luxury movie-going in Thailand and it remains popular for years.
- D-Cine – Small, living-room-like theaters where customers can program their own DVD movie showings.
- Drive-In Café – A short-lived concept, this was tried in 2003 in an auditorium at EGV Seacon in Prawet district and EGV Rangsit in Pathum Thani province. Featuring a 1950s American drive-in theater motif, the audience sat in automobile-like restaurant booths and could be served hot dogs and hamburgers while they watched a movie.

=== Major ===
In 2024, when the Seacon Bangkae branch, which was then called "Grand EGV", was under renovation, Major Cineplex announced the name of the new branch using the first name "Bangkae Cineplex" before eventually changing the name to "Major Bangkae". In the following year, Major Cineplex decided to use the name "Major" as the sole brand to rebrand all Major Cineplex, Major Cinema and EGV branches to use the same name since April 2025 to make the brand as memorable as possible. The rebranding project began at Major Cineplex, Central Pinklao branch, under the name "Major Central Pinklao" as the first branch.

=== Paragon Cineplex ===
Opened in early 2006, Paragon Cineplex is on the fifth floor of the Siam Paragon shopping mall. With 13 screens and 4,186 seats, it is Thailand's former largest movie theater location until 2025. It includes the 1,200-seat Siam Pavalai Royal Grand Theatre. There is also the Enigma, a members-only cinema and the Thailand's second ScreenX theatre. It was firstly located at the Quartier CineArt. and the 4DX theatre.

=== IMAX ===
Thailand's second IMAX cinema is part of the Paragon Cineplex at Siam Paragon. It was firstly located at the Major Cineplex Ratchayothin.

In 2025, Major Cineplex Group has 10 IMAX Theatres around Thailand. The locations with IMAX with Laser theatre are Paragon Cineplex at Siam Paragon, ICON Cineconic at Iconsiam Bangkok, Quartier CineArt The EmQuartier Bangkok, Esplanade Cineplex Ngamwongwan-Khaerai, Bangkapi Cineplex at M Lifestore Bangkapi, Major Cineplex Ratchayothin, Major Cineplex CentralFestival Chiangmai, Westgate Cineplex at Central WestGate, Major Central Pinklao at Central Pinklao and Mega Cineplex at Central Mega Bangna which is the only IMAX with Laser theater that does not feature IMAX nXos 12.1 channel sound system.

Major Cineplex also operates IMAX Theater in Cambodia, it is a part of the Major Cineplex by SMART at AEON Mall Sen Sok.

In 2023, Major Cineplex and IMAX Corporation announced they would be opening 10 new IMAX with Laser locations around Thailand and Cambodia. This would be the biggest investment in IMAX system within Southeast Asia. The 10 locations include 5 upgrade locations that will transform IMAX Digital 2K Xenon projectors to laser projector. They will start with Major Cineplex Ratchayothin and Quartier CineArt in 2023, Major Cineplex CentralFestival Chiangmai in 2024 and finally, the Westgate Cineplex and Major Cineplex by SMART AEON Mall Sen Sok in 2025. A further 5 new installations will start with Esplanade Cineplex Ngamwongwan-Khae Rai in 2023, Bangkapi Cineplex at M Lifestore Bangkapi in 2024, Major Central Pinklao at Central Pinklao in 2025, and 2 more location which will be revealed within 2026 that will focus on prime and strategic locations.

=== Esplanade Cineplex ===
Opened in late 2006, Esplanade Cineplex is a forth installment of Major Cineplex specialty chain. It's located on the fifth floor of Central Esplanade Ratchada shopping mall in Dindeang district. With 12 screens, including 2 Cinema Galleries for showing the Experimental film, VIP Cinema screens with reclining seats and Southeast Asia first Dolby Vision+Atmos cinema.

However, Major Cineplex has opened a second branch of Esplanade with brand using from Central Pattana in Nonthaburi Province called Esplanade Cineplex Ngamwongwan-Khaerai, and serve Thailand's biggest and largest digital laser cinema theater "GLS: Giant Laser Screen" which the theater was converted to sixth branch of IMAX with Laser in November 2023. This branch also provide a same functional of Esplanade Ratchada except Dolby Atmos, and RealD 3D cinema system.

=== Mega Cineplex ===
The sixth installment of the Major Cineplex chain, exclusively built at the Mega Bangna shopping mall in Samut Prakarn. It's designed in pixel and the Digital theme as the cinema is Thailand's first Digiplex that all 15 screens are equipped with the only Digital 4K projector, and RealD cinema system, and do not feature a 35-mm film projector in this branch. This brand also includes 4DX theatre, ScreenX theatre, Thailand's third IMAX with Laser theatre, and Thailand's largest LED cinema screens powered by LG Miraclass Cinema System.

=== Quartier CineArt ===
The eighth installment of Major Cineplex chain, exclusively built in The EmQuartier Bangkok shopping mall. It is said to be a Thailand first CineArt concept. With 8 screen, including fourth branch of IMAX with Laser, Thailand first Laser Projector "AEON THEATRE @ QUARTIER", Dolby Atmos and RealD XL theatre, and 5 digital cinemas.

=== ICON Cineconic ===
The seventeenth installment of Major Cineplex chain, exclusively built in Iconsiam Bangkok shopping mall in 2018. It is said to be a Thailand first interracial standard concept and Thailand first laserplex. With 9 screens and 1,456 seats, ICON Cineconic cinemas are including The Iconic IMAX Theater-the first IMAX with Laser theater in Thailand that equipped by IMAX-Barco 2nd generation laser projector (the Commercial Laser; CoLa) and 12.1 channel IMAX nXos sound system, The Iconic VIP Screen-the 6 star theater, Cineconic Kids Cinema, Cineconic Living Cinema-a cinema-themed with living room concept that provide for group rental or event rental first, the Iconic 4DX theater, Dolby Atmos theater, and 3 digital cinemas that equipped with laser projection system.

=== One Ultra Screens ===
The twenty-third installment of the Major Cineplex specialty chain was exclusively built at the Parade at One Bangkok shopping mall in 2024. Formerly operated separately by Cinema One Company Limited, it is regarded as Thailand’s first “club cinema” concept, in which cinema clubs can also function as social hangout spaces. The complex features six screens with approximately 1,500 seats. One Ultra Screens cinemas include the Thai Airways Smooth as Silk Premier Cinema, a six-star theater; a Kids Cinema; Estophere by Est, the largest cinema hall, equipped with an ultimate immersive Univisium screen approximately 7 meters tall; and three digital cinemas fitted with laser projection systems.

=== Embassy Diplomat Screens ===
The twenty-fourth installment of the Major Cineplex specialty chain was exclusively built at the Central Embassy shopping mall in 2017. Currently operated separately by Executive Cinema Corporation Company Limited, Embassy Diplomat Screens (originally developed as Embassy Cineplex) is a premium luxury cinema concept in Thailand backed by Major Cineplex, with participation from foreign investors and Canadian cinema industry executives who helped introduce IMAX technology to Southeast Asia.

The cinema was designed by the Rockwell Group, drawing inspiration from the flowing form of 35mm film—reflecting the classic celluloid roots of motion pictures. It features 4K laser projection (8-megapixel resolution) and was the first cinema in Thailand to implement the RealD XL 3D projection system, which was later adopted by Major Cineplex at Quartier Cineart.

Embassy Diplomat Screens consists of five auditoriums, all equipped with RealD XL. Auditoriums 1, 3, and 5 are styled with a “home-like” luxury atmosphere, while auditoriums 2 and 4 follow a more traditional first-class cinema design, similar in feel to VIP Cinema theaters at Paragon Cineplex.

=== The "M" Cineplex Collection ===
In 2016, Major Cineplex has launched the "M" cineplex collection to regrouping the Major Cineplex specialty chain into one cinema group and refers to new boutique cinema concept. It's including all brand of Major Groups cinema except Paragon Cineplex, Esplanade Cineplex, Quartier CineArt, Icon Cineconic, and Mega Cineplex.

The "M" cineplex collection has an eleventh specialty cinema around Thailand. The chain brand's include:

- Hatyai Cineplex - Located in Central Hatyai shopping mall in Hatyai, Songkhla. Designed in Crystal theme that related to shopping mall theme. This brand included "Giant Laser Screen" and "VIP Cinema" theatres.
- WestGate Cineplex - Located in Central WestGate shopping mall in Bang Yai, Nonthaburi. Designed in Digital Edge theme. This brand included "IMAX with Laser", "VIP Cinema" and "Kids Cinema" theatres.
- Promenade Cineplex - Located in The Promenade shopping mall in Ramintra, Bangkok. Designed in Classical theme. This brand included "Giant Laser Screen" and "Kids Cinema" theatres.
- Eastville Cineplex - Located in Central Eastville shopping mall in Bangkok. Designed in English Garden cinema concept and provide the first eco-cineplex that belong to "Green Ville" concepts of shopping mall. This brand included "VIP Cinema" and "Kids Cinema" theatres.
- Diana Cineplex - Located in Diana shopping mall in Hatyai, Songkhla. Designed in Movie Relaxation theme.
- Ayutthaya City Park Cineplex - Located in Ayutthaya City Park shopping mall in Phra Nakhon Si Ayutthaya. Designed in Movie Relaxation theme.
- Korat Cineplex - Located in The Mall Korat shopping mall in Nakhon Ratchasima. Designed in Digital Edge theme belong to WestGate Cineplex. This brand included "Giant Laser Screen" and "Kids Cinema" theatres.
- Blúport Cineplex - Located in Blúport shopping mall in Huahin, Prachuap Khiri Khan. Designed in Resort theme belong to Blúport.
- Seacon Cineplex - Located in Seacon Square shopping mall in Srinakarin, Bangkok. Designed in Movie Relaxation theme. This brand included "Kids Cinema" theatre.
- Si Racha Cineplex - Located in Central Si Racha shopping mall in Si Racha, Chonburi. Designed in Digital Oasis and Resort theme.
- Chanthaburi Cineplex - Located in Central Chanthaburi shopping mall in Chanthaburi. Designed in Digital Oasis theme.
- Westville Cineplex - Located in Central Westville shopping mall in Nonthaburi. It is to be first cinema hall that designed for low carbon and sustainability design. All materials used for decorate are recycled materials. This brand included "Giant Laser Screen", "Pramy Pet Cinema" and "Kids Cinema" theatres.
- Bangkapi Cineplex - Located in The Mall Lifestore Bangkapi shopping mall in Bangkapi, Bangkok. It was once garage of SF Cinema with major renovation surround remnant of old SF inside theaters except to newly "IMAX with Laser" and is now opened with 7 cinemas from previously 9 cinemas portion. This brand included "Kids Cinema" theatre.
- Nakhon Pathom Cineplex - Located in Central Nakhon Pathom shopping mall in Nakhon Pathom. Designed in Digital Oasis theme. This brand included "Kids Cinema" theatre.

== Other businesses ==
While movie theaters are Major Cineplex Group's core business, the company is heavily involved in the bowling alley, and the ice skating rink business, with a total of 245 lanes under its Blu-O brand. It also has 127 karaoke rooms, and 4 rinks under its Sub-Zero brand. The company also provide leases for retail space to outside tenants in its anchored shopping malls, it has total 48,828 sqm rental space in 2022.

The company has also invested in California WOW Xperience Plc. (SET: CAWOW), the leading fitness center operator in Thailand. California WOW Xperience has 10 branches: eight in Bangkok, and one each in Pattaya and Chiang Mai. The company established California WOW Xperience due to foreign ownership rules for the wholly owned Asian subsidiary of 24 Hour Fitness, known as California Fitness. It has member swap agreements with both chains and holds a 36.75% stake in that venture. Consequently, California's Fitness Center branches are becoming part of Major Cineplex's developments.

However, the company sold all of its CAWOW stock before it was terminated by SET in 2011. CAWOW's business was completely shut down that year. In 2012, the Anti-Money Laundering Offices (ALMO) began investigating CAWOW's business and found that 99% of the business cash flow (1,669 million baht) had been transferred from CAWOW to other nominees by Eric Mark Levine, the CEO of CAWOW. As a result, the business went bankrupt in 2013. The ALMO froze an 88-million-baht land plot in Phuket before it was transferred to a nominee, leading to a lawsuit between Eric and ALMO.

After the shutdown of CAWOW, the old CAWOW team and Major Cineplex formed a new fitness club business under the WE brand. The concept behind WE is that it will not accept new members once the member list exceeds their branch limits. Currently, WE Fitness has 6 locations around Bangkok and Nonthaburi provinces. The 5 clubs under WE Fitness Society are Major Cineplex Ratchayothin, Major Cineplex Sukhumvit-Ekkamai, Major Cineplex Pinklao, Central The Esplanade, and the Esplanade Cineplex Khaerai. Additionally, there are 1 premium club under WE Signature at the Vie Hotel Bangkok Ratchathewi.

Major Cineplex is also have a ticketing service, Major Ticketing, which sold advance bookings for movies, as well as other events. However, it was merged with BEC-TERO's Thaiticketmaster in 2007. The merged entity is called Thai Ticket Major. Later in 2023, Major Cineplex was sold the 20% stake in Thai Ticket Major to Ticketmaster Europe which 20% remains.

In 2008, Major Cineplex swapped 79.99% share in M Pictures Co. Ltd. with 146,920,114 shares or 40.81% in Traffic Corner Holdings Plc. (TRAF) at Bt1.84 per share, totaling Bt.270.3 million and subsequently renamed as M Pictures Entertainment Plc. (MPIC). M Pictures continued to co-owned with Major Cineplex until 2023 when the company is sold to popular musical artist, Khanngoen Nuanual.
