= Central Pattana =

Thai property development and investment company

Central Pattana เซ็นทรัลพัฒนา
- Type: Public
- Traded as: SET: CPN
- ISIN: TH0481B10Z00
- Industry: Property development
- Founded: June 17, 1980
- Founder: Central Group
- Headquarters: The Offices @ Central World, 31st Fl, 999/9 Pathum Wan, Bangkok, Thailand
- Area served: Southeast Asia
- Key people: Wallaya Chirathivat, CEO
- Products: Retail-led mixed-use development (shopping centers, residences, offices, and hotels)
- Revenue: 24,840 million baht (2021)
- Operating income: 30,398 million baht (2021)
- Total assets: 263,421 million baht (2021)
- Total equity: 82,075 million baht (2021)
- Owner: Central Holdings; Chirathivat Family
- Number of employees: 3,561
- Parent: Central Group
- Website: www.centralpattana.co.th/en/

Central Pattana Public Company Limited (Thai: เซ็นทรัลพัฒนา จำกัด (มหาชน), IPA: [sentʰran pʰáttʰánaː]) is Thailand's largest retail property development and investment company. It is a business unit under its parent, the Central Group. Central Pattana was founded as Central Plaza Co., Ltd. on 17 June 1980 with registered capital of 300 million baht by Central Group, the Tejapaibul family, Saha Union Group, and minor shareholders. The company was registered as a public limited company in 1994 and was listed on the Stock Exchange of Thailand (SET) on 1 March 1995. Wallaya Chirathivat is president and CEO.

== Properties ==
Central Pattana currently operates 36 shopping centers, with a total leasable area of 1.9 million m2 (15 projects in Bangkok and perimeter, 20 projects in provincial Thailand and 1 project in Malaysia), a super-regional mall under a joint-venture and 18 community malls. In addition, the company operates 32 food courts, 10 office buildings, 2 hotels, and 22 residential projects.

Central Village, the first luxury outlet in Thailand, opened on August 31, 2019. It is located near Suvarnabhumi Airport and is 30-45 minutes from Bangkok CBD. It is a joint venture between Central Pattana Plc. and Mitsubishi Estate (Thailand) Co. Ltd., a subsidiary of global real estate Mitsubishi Estate Co. Ltd.

Central i-City, in Shah Alam, Selangor, Malaysia, is Central Pattana's first overseas full-scaled Thai shopping center in Malaysia. This underscores Central Pattana as a leader by creating a ‘New Shopping Experience’ and a ‘Center of Life’ in the ASEAN region. This is a joint-venture project between Central Pattana and i-Berhad (the owner of i-City project). The project is located in i-City Ultrapolis, a grand lifestyle hub in Shah Alam.

== Gallery ==
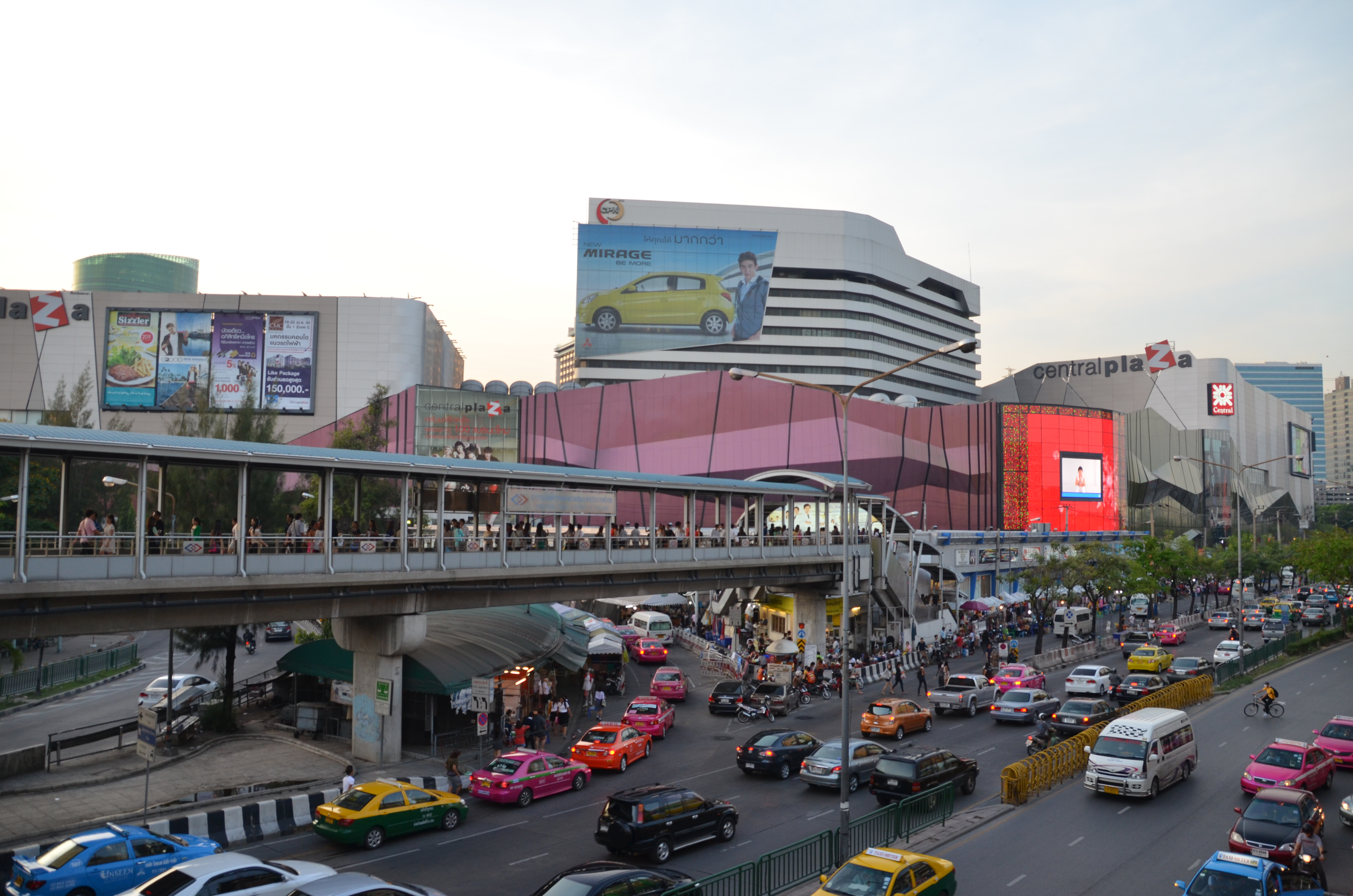
Central Ladprao, CPN's first one stop service shopping mall

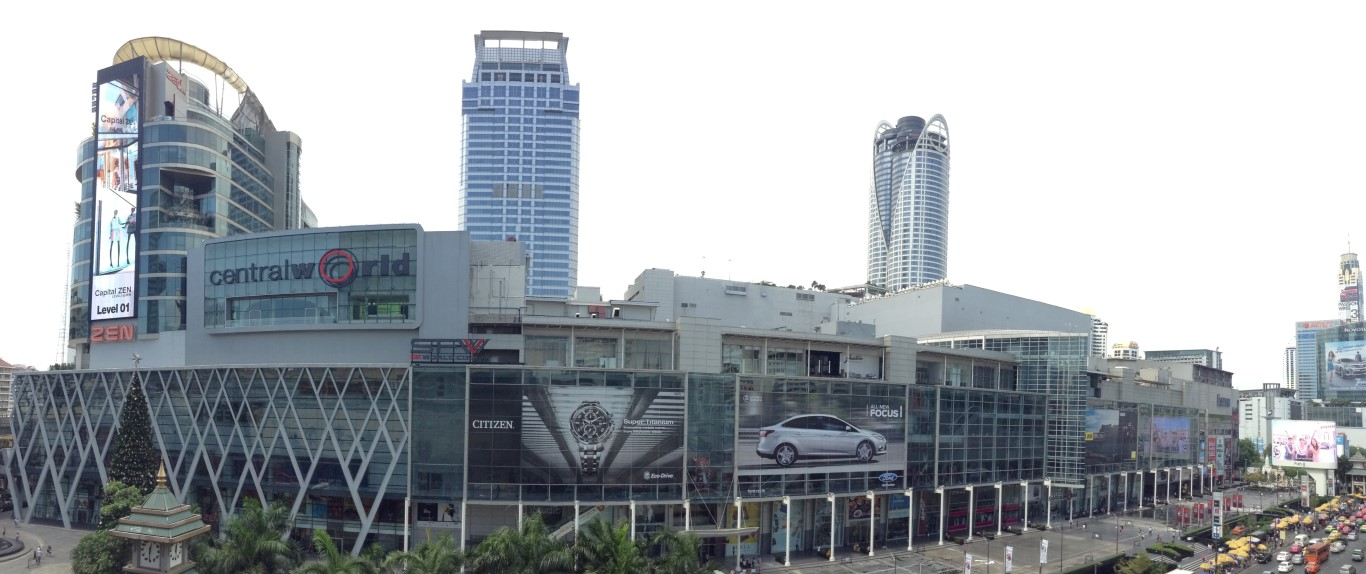
CentralWorld, the first super-regional mall in Bangkok

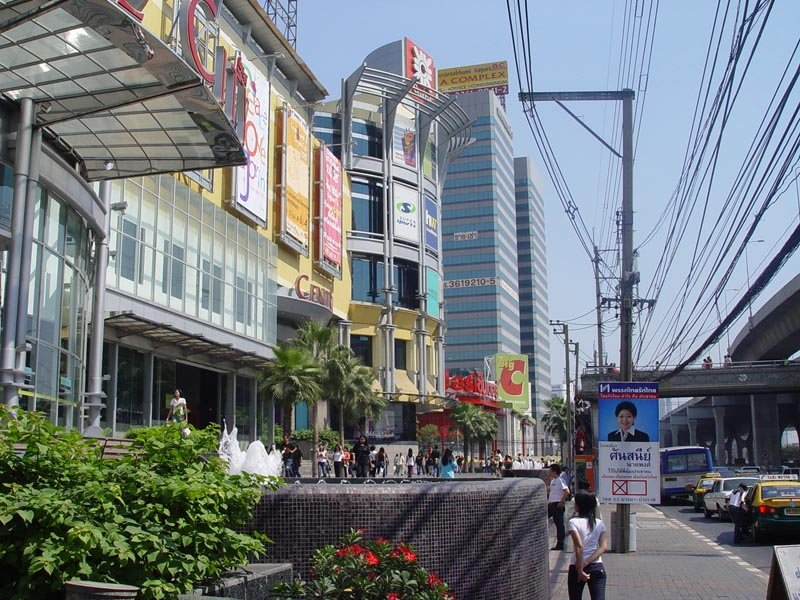
Old façade, Central Bangna (1993–2015)

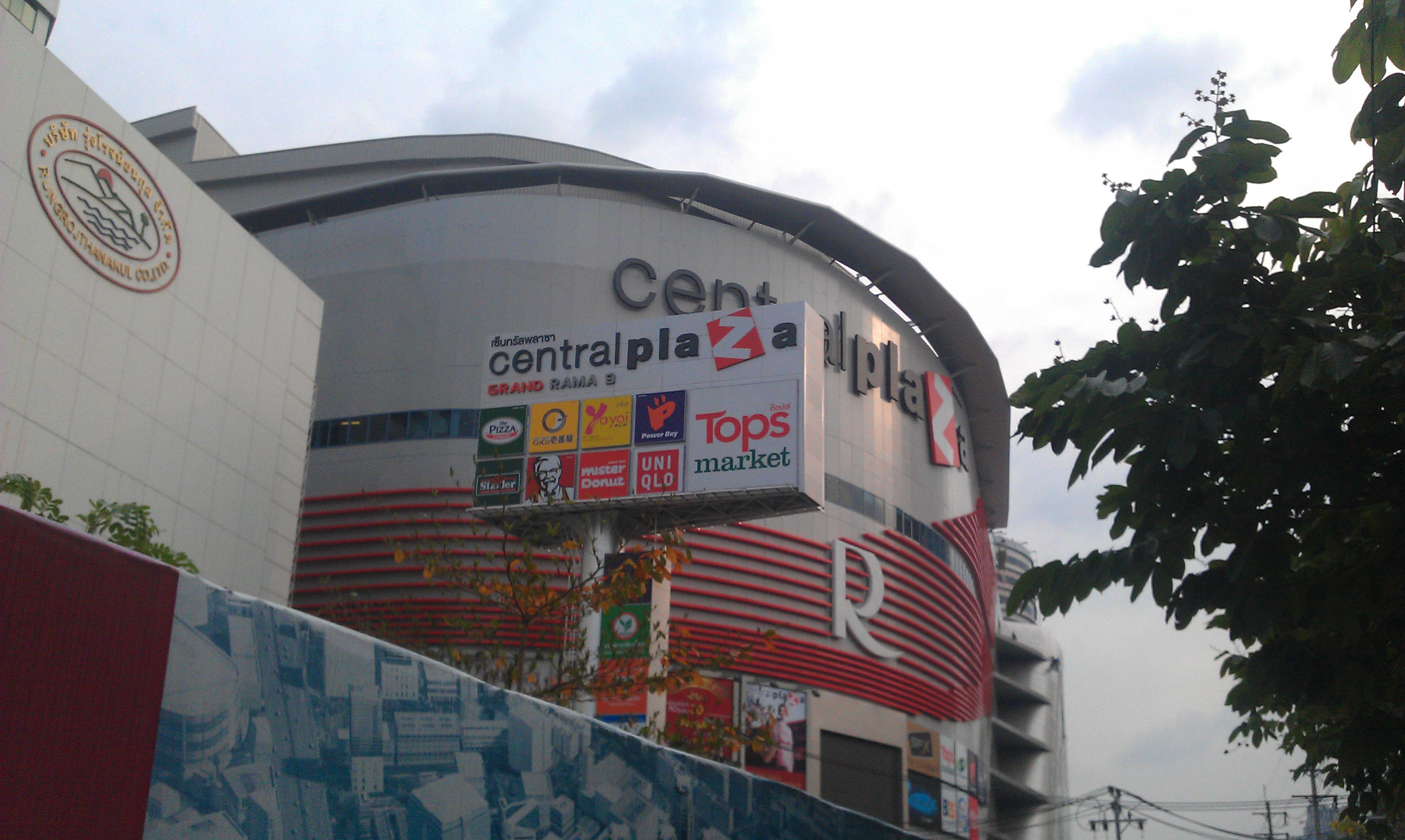
Central Rama 9

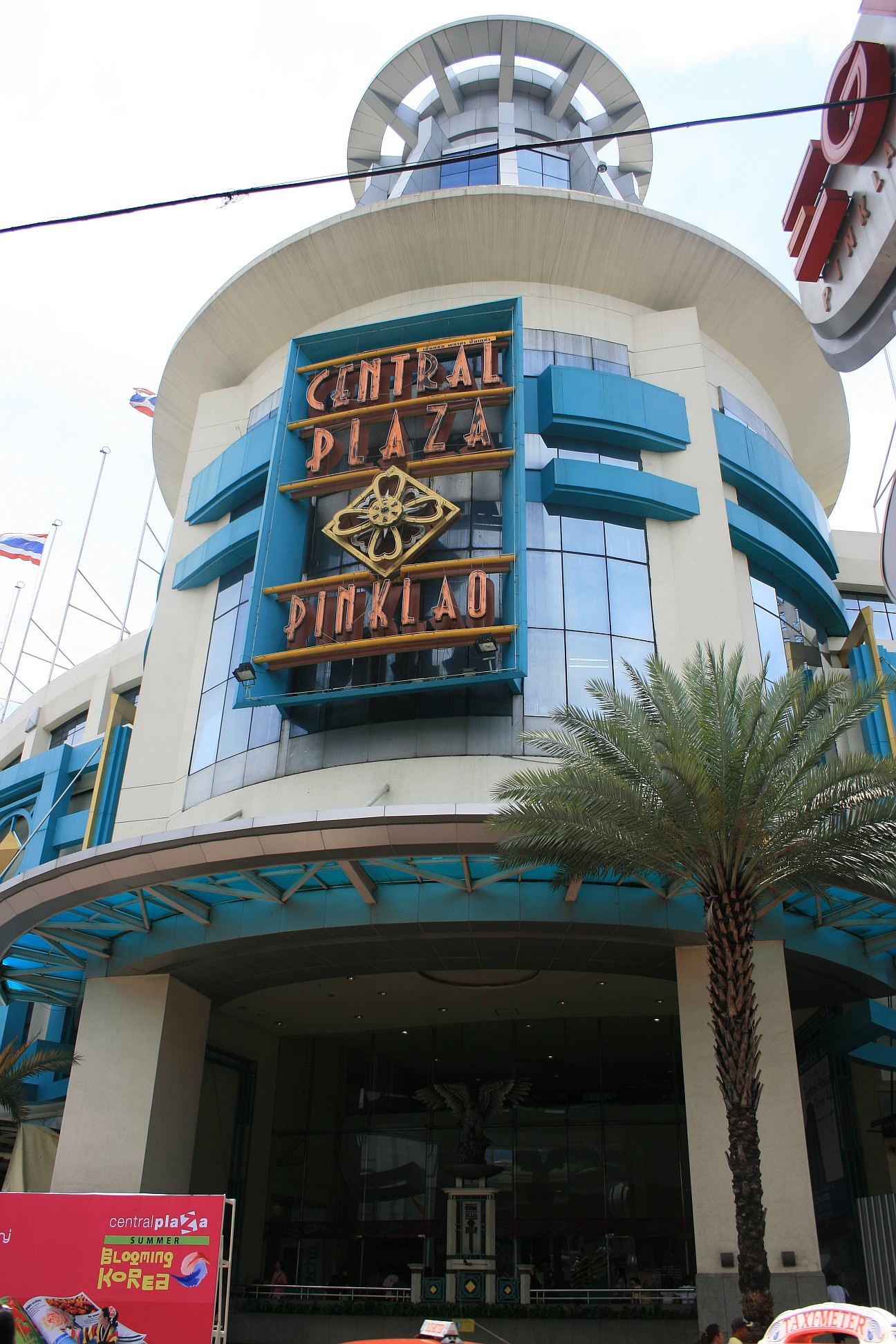
Old façade, Central Pinklao (1995–2010)

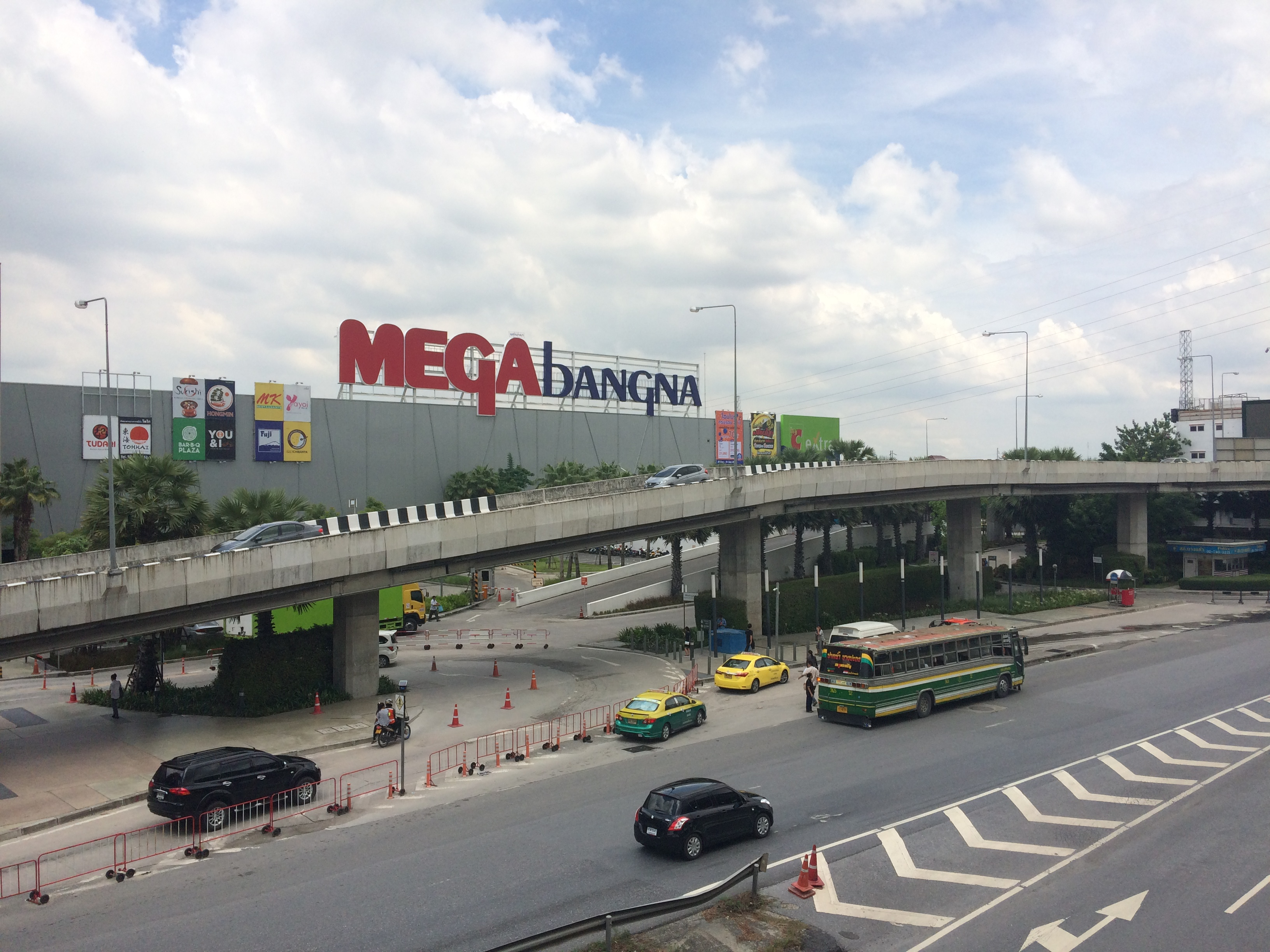
Mega Bangna

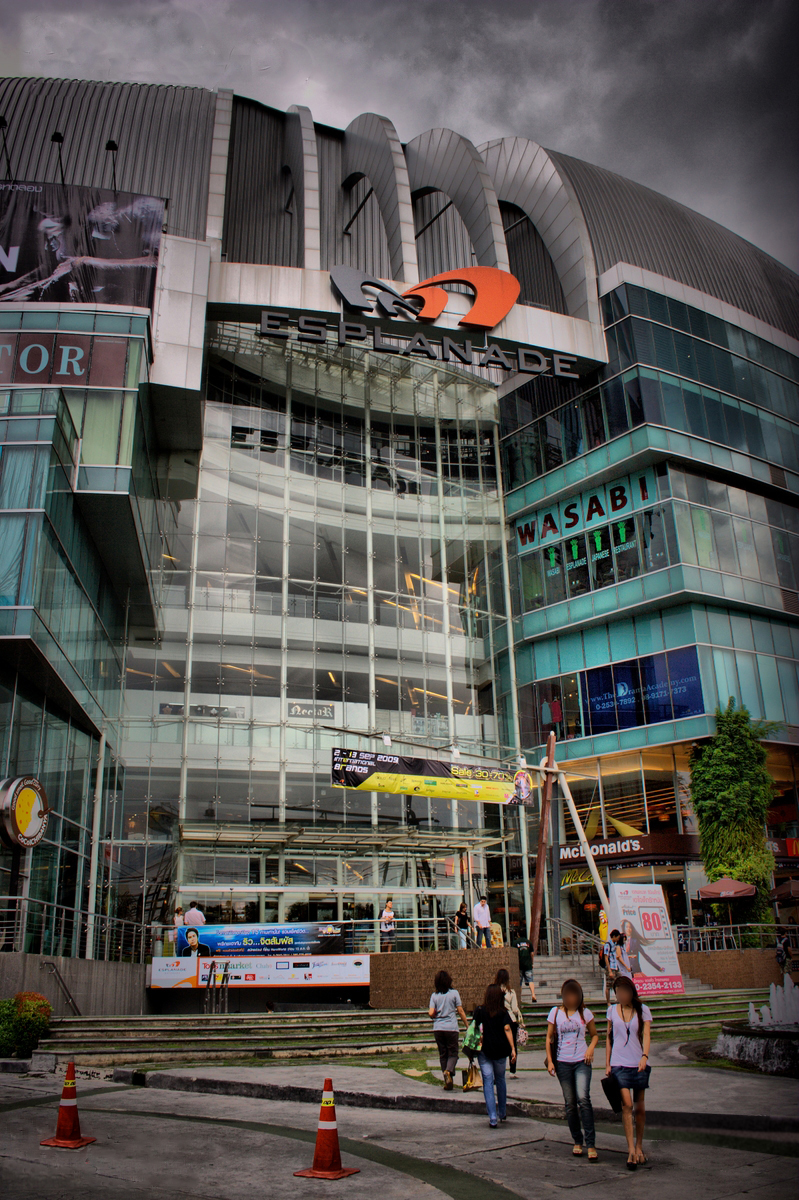
The Esplanade, Bangkok

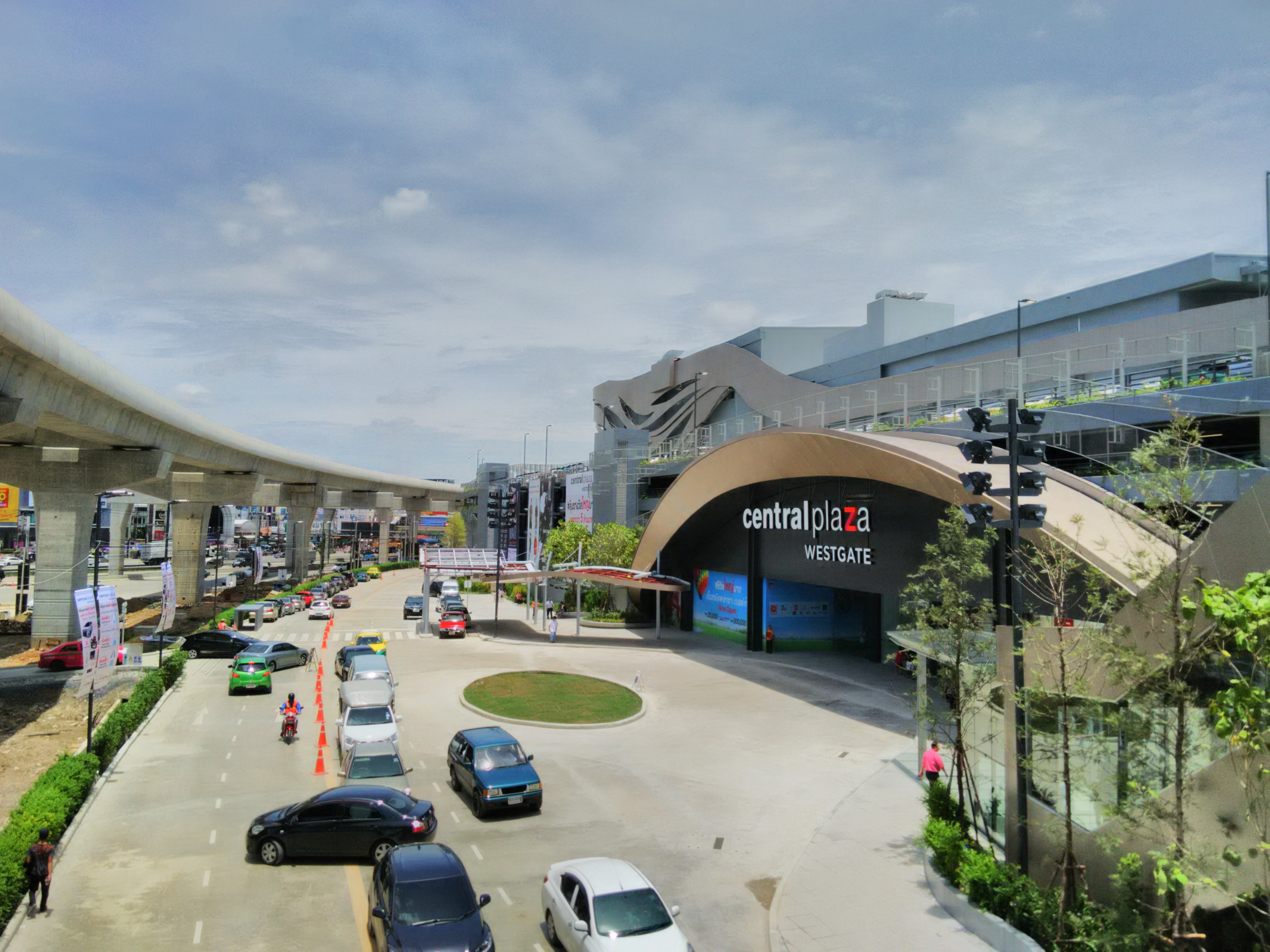
Central WestGate

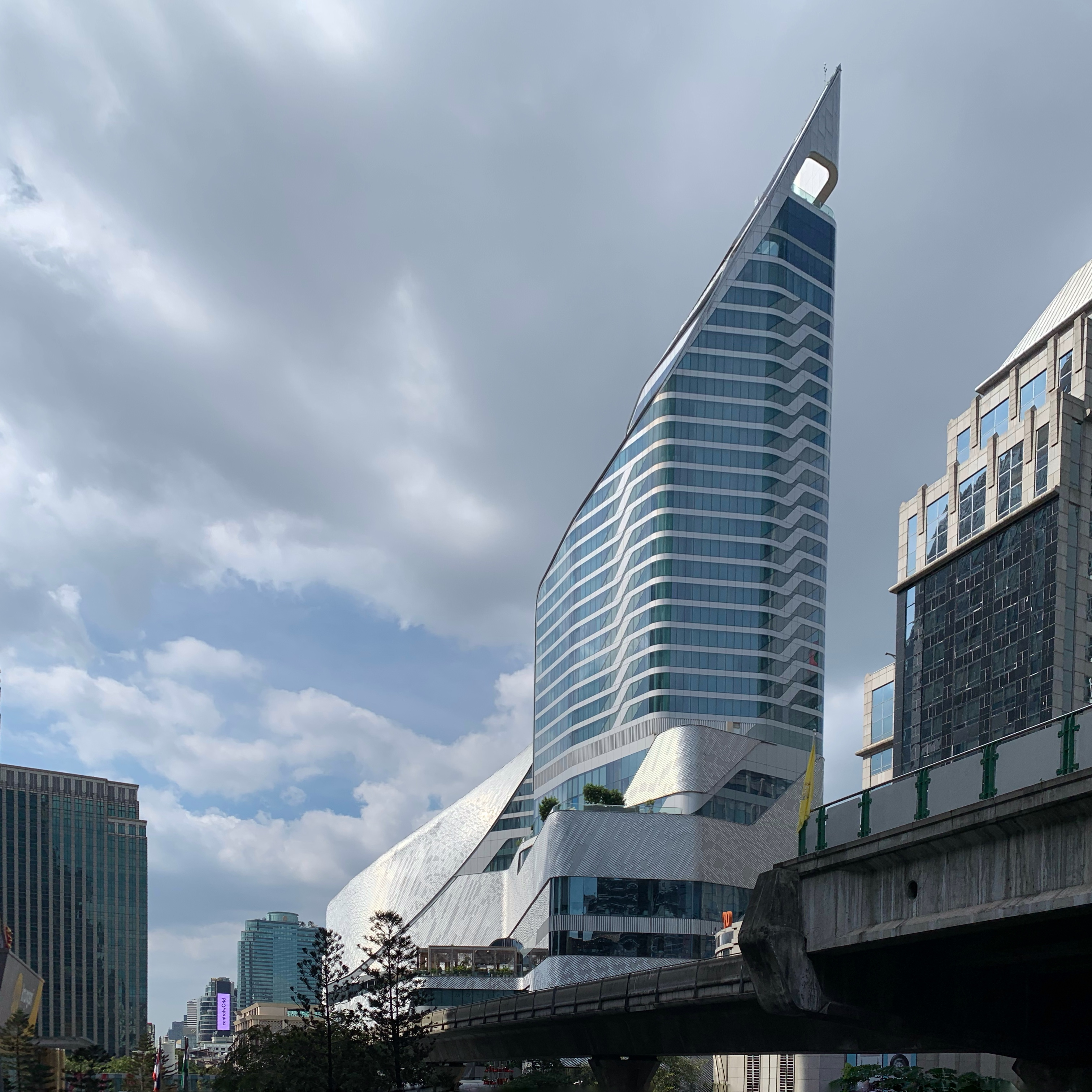
Central Embassy

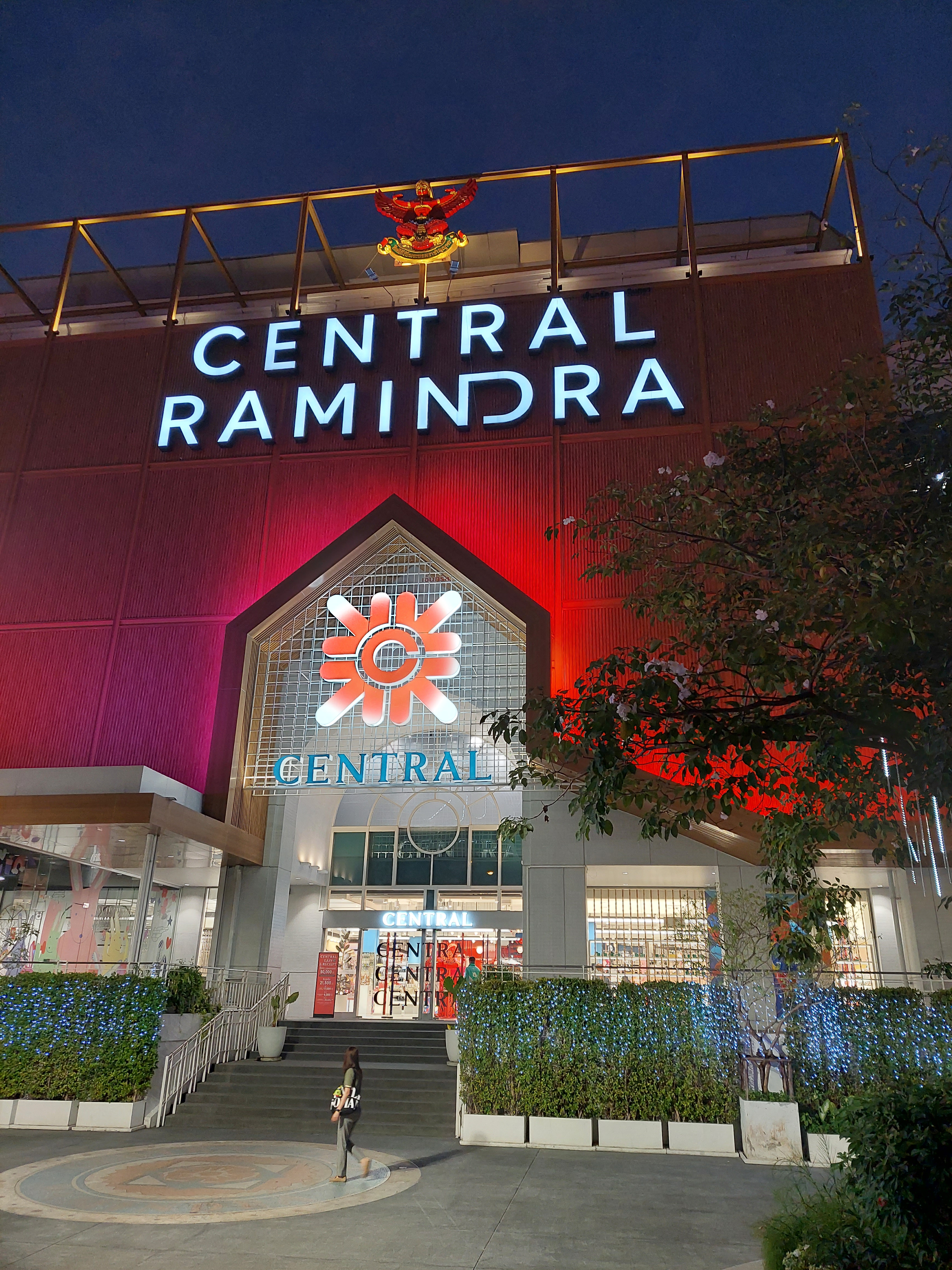
Central Ramindra

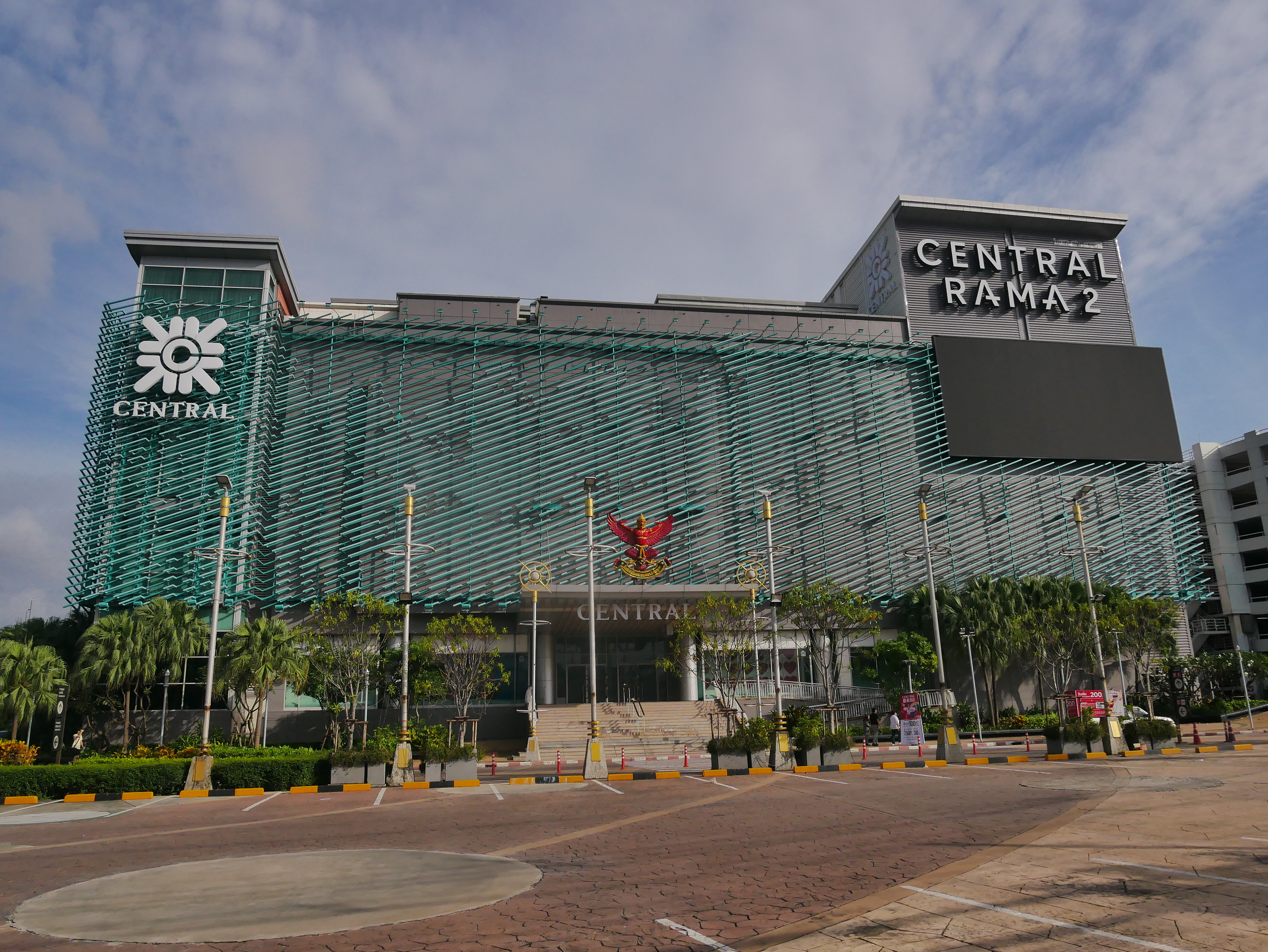
Central Rama 2

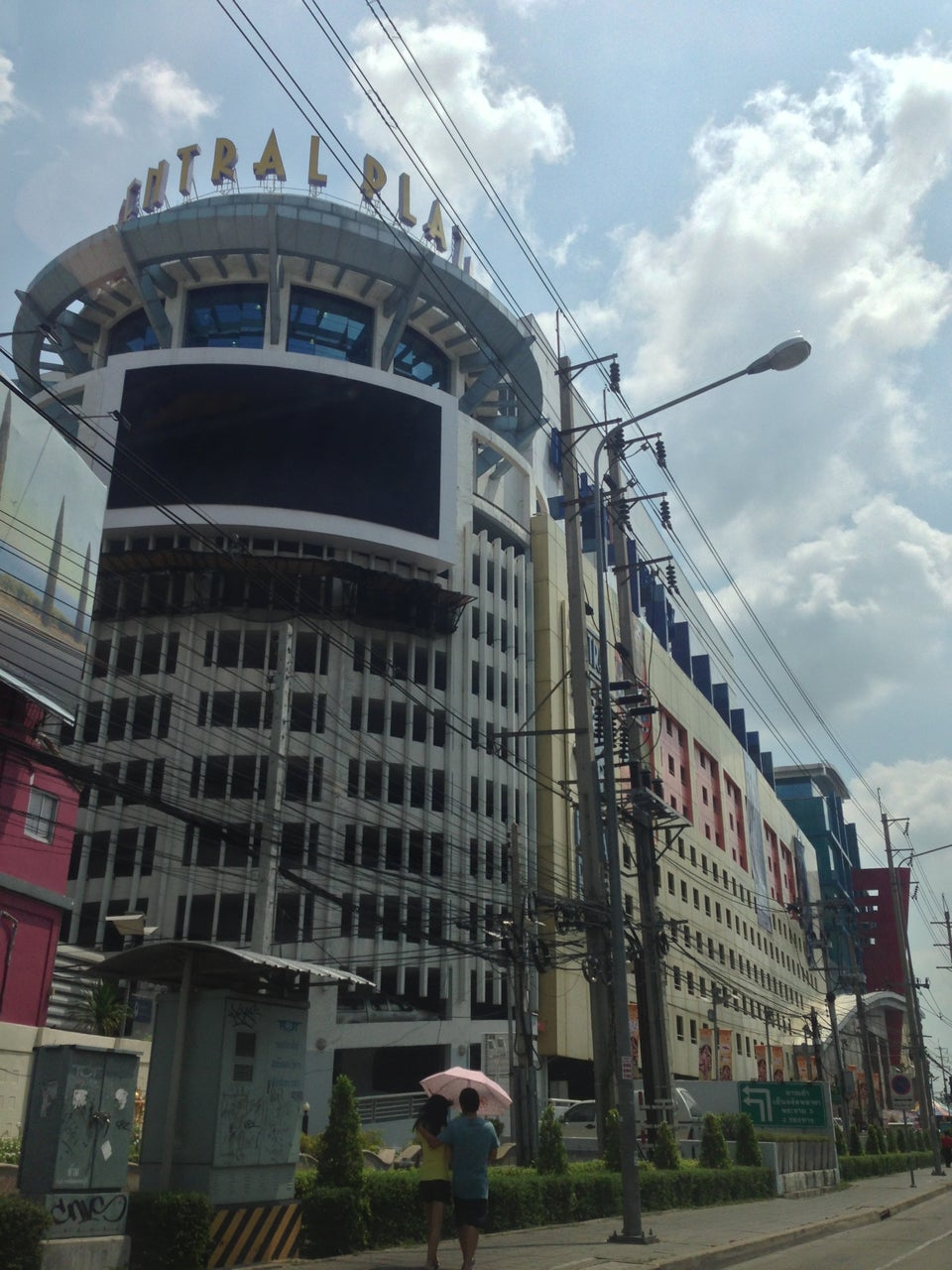
Old façade, Central Rama 3 (1997-2017)

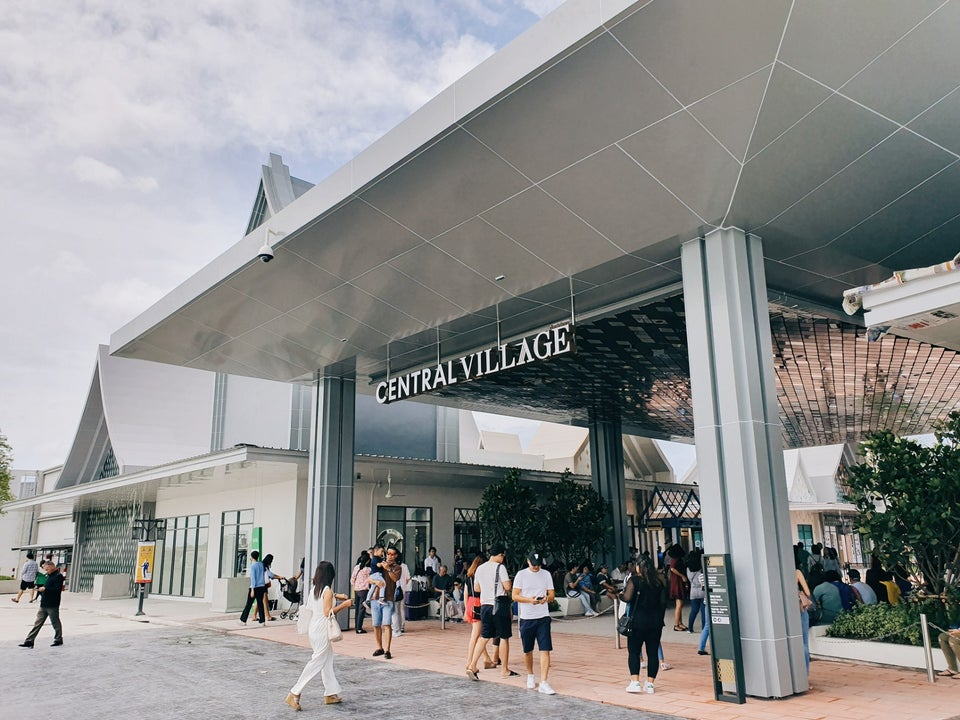
Central Village Luxury Outlet
