= Palladium World =

Palladium Square
- พัลลาเดียม สแควร์

- Palladium World in 2026
- Location: Pratunam, Bangkok, Thailand
- Coordinates: 13.750187°N 100.542241°E
- Address: Phetchaburi Road
- Opened: July 2011
- Developer: Great China Millennium Thailand
- Owner: Great China Millennium Thailand
- Floor area: 240,000 m^{2} (2,600,000 sq ft)
- Floors: 7

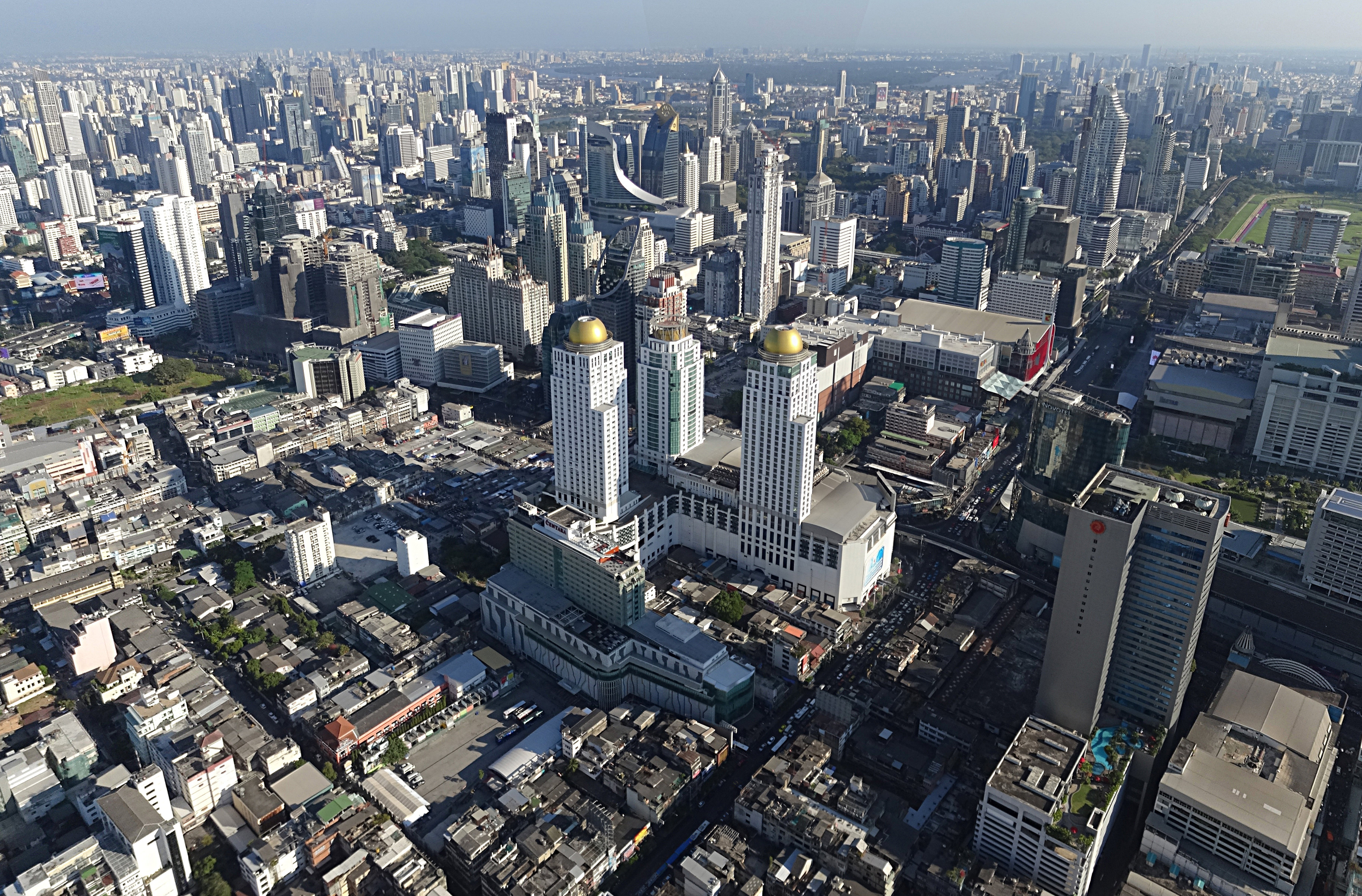
Pratunam shopping mall

Palladium Square (Thai: พัลลาเดียม สแควร์) is a shopping mall currently under redevelopment in Ratchathewi district, Bangkok, Thailand. It was formerly known as "Pratunam Center".

== Overview ==
The complex will be the largest wholesale and retail center of the Pratunam area. Situated on 14 rai, or 240,000 square meters. It features fashion, appliances, IT products a large supermarket, brand names shops and restaurants. It is expected to be fully opened in mid-2011 with at least 200,000 customers a day. Great China Millennium (the operator of Bobae Mall) bought the complex in 2011. The former owners of Pratunam Center sold the complex because it was not successful.

== Hotel/Office ==
Meanwhile, the shopping center features 2 office buildings and a 4-star, 800-room hotel building including room service. The hotel has been opened since early 2012.

== Floors ==
1. The Palladium Square
2. Fashion
3. Jewelry
4. Mobile & IT
5. Souvenirs
6. Food
7. Supermarket

The mall is located on Phetchaburi Road, opposite of Pantip Plaza and the Platinum Fashion Mall. It is also near CentralWorld.

== See also ==
- List of shopping malls in Bangkok
- List of shopping malls in Thailand
