= Leena Jung =

Thai businesswoman, lawyer and television host (born 1959)

Leena Jungjanja ลีนา จังจรรจา
- Born: Leena Sae-Jung; 14 September 1959 (age 67); Bangkok, Thailand
- Education: Ramkhamhaeng University (LL.B.)
- Occupations: TikToker; Youtuber; host; actress; businesswoman; lawyer
- Spouse: Wanchai Sangpornsriarun
- Children: Witchu "Bird" Sangpornsriarun; Winai "Bank" Sangpornsriarun
- Parents: Ki-ngo Sae-Jung (father); Lungmui Sae-Tang (mother)

Leena Jungjanja known as Leena Jung (born September 14, 1959), is a Thai businesswoman, lawyer, television host, and former owner of the "Hot TV" station. She was the former leader of Maha Prachachon Party in Thailand. She has run for Bangkok gubernatorial elections in 2004, 2008 and 2009. She also owned a cosmetics shop at the Pratunam Center.

== Early life and family ==
Leena Jung was born in Bangkok to a Thai Chinese family. She is the ninth of 12 children of Ki-ngo Sae-Jung and Lungmui Sae-Tang, Teochew migrants from Shantou, China. Her family name is 曾, pronounced as Jung in Teochew or Zeng in Mandarin Chinese. Her family lived on Worachak Road and ran a palm fruit juice business.

She was named Leena because her parents could not understand the Thai language. When her father went to register her birth at the district office, he asked an official there to give her a Thai name. At that time, there was a popular Indian movie with a heroine named 'Leena', so the official gave her this name. Later, she changed her surname to Jungjanja in 2004 when she applied to be the governor of Bangkok because of the discrimination against people of Chinese descent in Thai political quarters.

Leena graduated with a Bachelor of Laws from Ramkhamhaeng University and earned her attorney's license from the Lawyers' Council of Thailand under the Royal Patronage.

Leena was married to Wanchai Sangpornsriarun but later divorced. They have two sons, Witchu "Bird" Sangpornsriarun (b. 21 September 1982) and Winai "Bank" Sangpornsriarun (b. 1987).

== Business career ==
Leena started working by helping her mother sell fresh palm fruit juice at Worachak Market. She then turned to starting a travel business, but had a fight with her mother and was kicked out of the house. After being kicked out of her home, Leena travelled to Chanthaburi province to stay with her friend from school, Wanchai Sangpornsriarun. The two lived together without marriage because they were not yet of age, but later got married. The couple had run a noodle shop there, but they later quarrelled because Wanchai had an affair.

Leena then travelled back to Bangkok to partner with her sister in a garment business at Pratunam Center, but later, there were many conflicts between her and her sister, so she opened her own clothing shop in 1987. She produced the clothing in her own factories and exported it to Europe, America, and the Middle East. Then, her husband came back to reconcile and they ran the clothing businesses together, but he continued to have mistresses and physically abused Leena, so the couple eventually divorced. She quit the garment business in 2003 due to the conflict in the Middle East and the market penetration of the Chinese industry. After that, she started a cosmetics business at Pratunam Center. The name of her cosmetics brand was HI-SO LEENA.

In 2011, Leena launched her own television channel HOT TV with a station in Pratunam. She was the only host of the channel while the content of the broadcast was mostly about politics. Similarly, she used this TV channel to advertise her cosmetics brand HI-SO LEENA and receives donations from viewers to pay for the signal rental. She let viewers call her to discuss legal issues on her television broadcasts for free, but many callers agitated and insulted her. Likewise, she was often criticized for her vulgar language on air. Moreover, she often criticized and insulted famous people in both politics and entertainment circles on her channel and often got criticized by the public. Leena used a flower garden view from Showa Memorial Park, Japan, which was misidentified as Keukenhof, Netherlands, as the background for her TV show, making the view become popular in Thailand until now.

=== Shut-down ===
POMC's document commanding Hot TV Station (1st on the list) to cease broadcasting on May 20, 2014, by General Prayut Chan-o-cha

During the 2013–2014 Thai political crisis, her TV channel featured aggressive political content alongside street protests. In addition, she was threatened and assaulted several times at the television station because of the dissatisfaction with the content on her channel. Finally, on 21 May 2014, her HOT TV station was ordered to suspend its satellite TV broadcasting by the Peace and Order Maintaining Command (POMC) following the declaration of Martial Law.

Before her TV channel was suspended, she had insulted General Prayut Chan-o-cha, director of the Peace and Order Maintaining Command (POMC) who led the 2014 Thai coup d'état, on air and posted the clip on YouTube. She challenged General Prayut to send soldiers to shoot her at the station.

On the afternoon of May 21, 2014, Leena arrived at the Army Club where she shouted abuses at Prayut Chan-o-cha, who accused her of inciting and distorting information, including unfairly ordering the suspension of her channel's broadcast, but he did not go out to meet her. She forbade the soldiers from touching her body, excusing them of indecent exposure and threatening to urinate in front of the building. Her action made the junta send in female soldiers specifically to come face to face with her.

After losing her television broadcast, she was left with no avenues to advertise her cosmetics brand, forcing her to quit her cosmetics business. She said she had lost over 25 million baht from the television station shutdown.

== Political roles ==
Leena first became politically active during the Tom Yum Kung crisis. She joined the movement to oust General Chavalit Yongchaiyudh, Prime Minister of Thailand during that time, by dressing flashily in an attempt to stand out.

She ran for the 2004 Bangkok gubernatorial election, campaigning by bringing LGBTQ+ people in fancy dress to parade. Unfortunately, she was stripped of her political rights by the Election Commission of Thailand for a year because she had campaigned by bringing her team in a pickup truck to dance and sing, which is against election regulations in case of entertainment organizing.

In 2007, Leena had joined the Neutral Democratic Party, but the party did not support her for the 2007 Thai general election. So, she sued the party leader, Prachai Leophai-ratana, for five million baht in damages, but the court dismissed the case. Then, she moved to the Palang Phaendin Thai Party, but was ultimately not elected.

In 2008, she ran for a second time in the Bangkok gubernatorial election. She proposed a policy to provide smart tickets for all types of public transportation, including transit buses, the MRT, the BTS Skytrain, and the Chao Phraya Express Boat. This time, she had her campaign team dress up in fancy costumes. She created a sensation by falling into the Saen Saep Canal during the way to debate with other candidates at the National Institute of Development Administration. She screamed and begged for help, yelling "it stinks... stinks.. stinks so bad". However, she later said that she deliberately let herself fall into the dirty canal because she wanted the media to report on her, at the advice of Nawat Itsaragrisil. Furthermore, she campaigned by swimming in Sam Wa Canal, which resulted in the death of one of her campaign staff members.

In 2009, she ran for a third time in the Bangkok gubernatorial election, but she did not win the election.

During the 2010 Thai political protests, Leena called for justice for the United Front for Democracy Against Dictatorship (UDD), saying, "I urge entrepreneurs in the Ratchaprasong area to allow the Red Shirts to rally and demand their rights." She also mentioned that she had been affected by the protest in her work as a businesswoman in the Pratunam area, but she was willing to make the sacrifices. Moreover, she also criticized Prime Minister Abhisit Vejjajiva, saying he was such a liar and Bangkokians had elected him because he had been handsome. On the other hand, she accused and insulted the Red Shirts after the military crackdown, for engulfing Bangkok in fires and riots.

During the 2013 Bangkok gubernatorial election, Leena was gossiped about whether she would run or not. Later, she announced that she would not run because she had started HOT TV in 2011 and the owner of the television station could not be a politician.

On April 4, 2014, she and her sons founded the Maha Prachachon Party, with her as party leader and running for 2014 senator election. However, a coup d'état occurred on May 22, 2014. She was banned from political activities by General Prayut Chan-o-cha, director of the Peace and Order Maintaining Command (POMC), who led the coup d'état. In August 2014, the Election Commission of Thailand resolved to revoke Leena's election rights and pressed a criminal charge against her for deceptive election campaigns during the 2014 senator election. The allegation resulted in her being issued a red card by the Election Commission and having her political rights revoked for 10 years. In the same month, she attempted suicide.

After being stripped of her political rights and having her television station shut down, she has turned to political commentary on her Facebook page, ข่าวโหด คุยกับลีน่าจัง.

On March 9, 2017, Thailand's Supreme Court sentenced Leena to one year in prison, suspended for two years, and a fine of 100,000 baht for her 2014 allegation.

In the 2019 Thai general election, Leena was predicted to be the Thai Raksa Chart Party's prime ministerial candidate, but she announced that she could not do so because she was still under the period of political disenfranchisement, while the Thai Raksa Chart Party later announced the nomination of Princess Ubolratana as its sole candidate for prime minister in this election.

In 2025, Leena revealed through her Facebook live that she wanted to be in politics again, wanting to be an MP for the Pheu Thai Party. On September 27, 2025, Leena joined the Red Shirts to support Thaksin Shinawatra, Thailand's ex-prime minister, in front of Klong Prem Central Prison. She praised the Pheu Thai Party, particularly for its efforts to promote LGBTQ rights in Thailand. She said she believed Pheu Thai alone would secure a landslide victory, getting 280 seats. She also stated that she would replace Chalerm Yubamrung as the 10th party-list MP, as he had betrayed Thaksin Shinawatra by voting for Anutin Charnvirakul.

== Legal roles ==
In 2001, Leena, along with a wealthy businessmen in Pratunam, founded the Leena Jang Foundation to provide free legal education and aide to the public, particularly the poor and those who have been denied justice. She used to host a legal talk-show on Channel 5, but later founded her own channel, Hot TV, in 2011, where most of her content was about law and politics. The public could call her for free legal assistance and advice.

Leena said she had never received any money from her attorney's license because she provided free legal assistance to the public and she also supported the foundation with her own money. She rarely tells anyone that she is a lawyer because she is quite rude.

Nowadays, she lets the public call, comment or message her to discuss legal issues via her Facebook Live.

== Filmography ==
=== Film ===
Year	Title	Character	Note	Ref.
2009	Sassy Player	Teacher Leena		
2009	Oh My Ghost!	Witch	On the day of the film's press conference, a fight broke out.	

=== Television series ===
Year	Title	Character	Note	Ref.
2008	True Love Next Door	herself	Channel 9 MCOT HD	
2016	DaoLongFaPhuPhaSiNgoen	Prisoner executed for lèse-majesté	Channel 3 HD	

== Other sources ==
- Leena Jung on TikTok
- Leena Jung on YouTube
- Leena Jung on Facebook
