= Khlong Saen Saep boat service =

Water bus in Bangkok, Thailand

Saen Saep express boat map

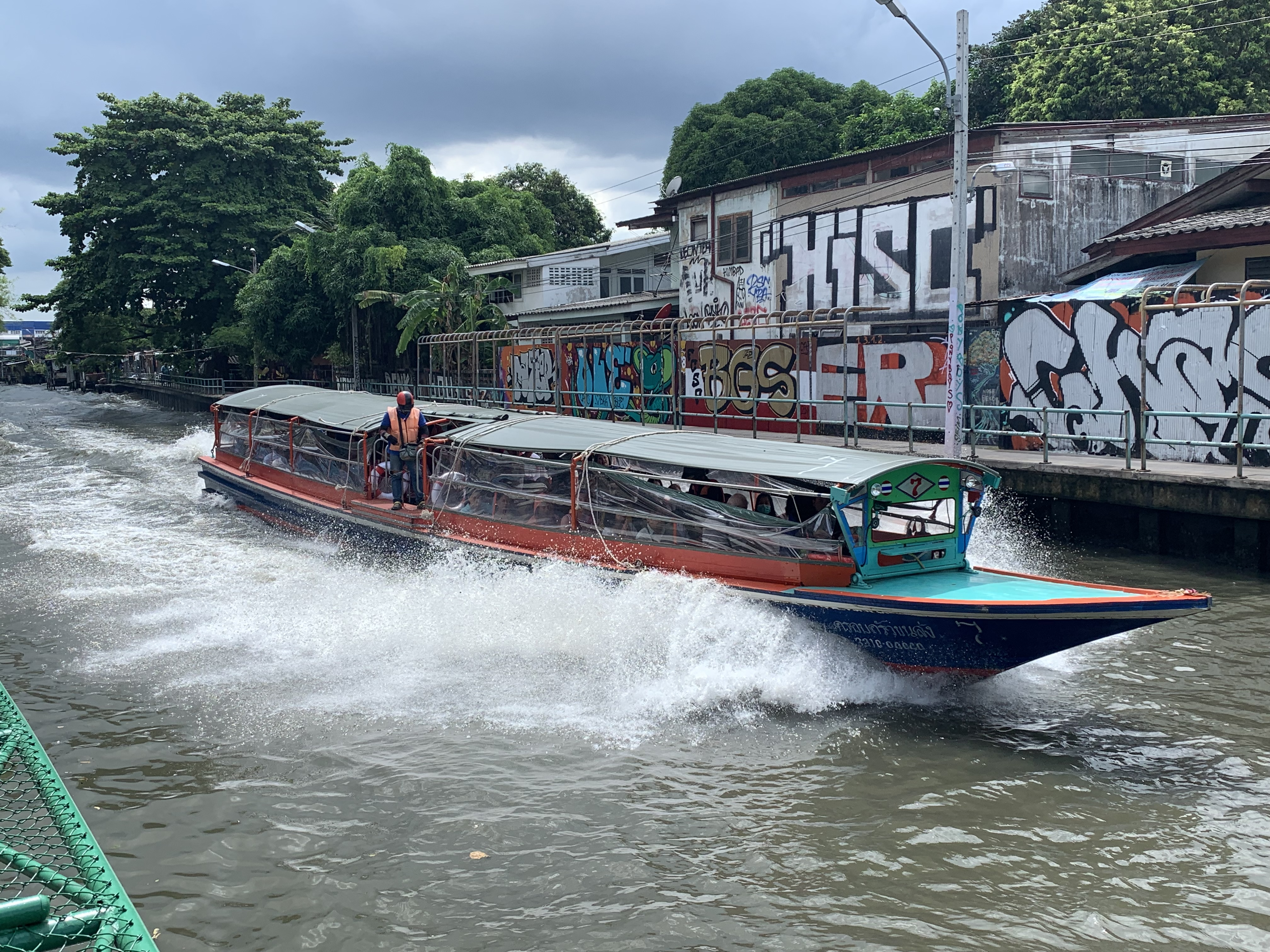
Saen Saep water bus

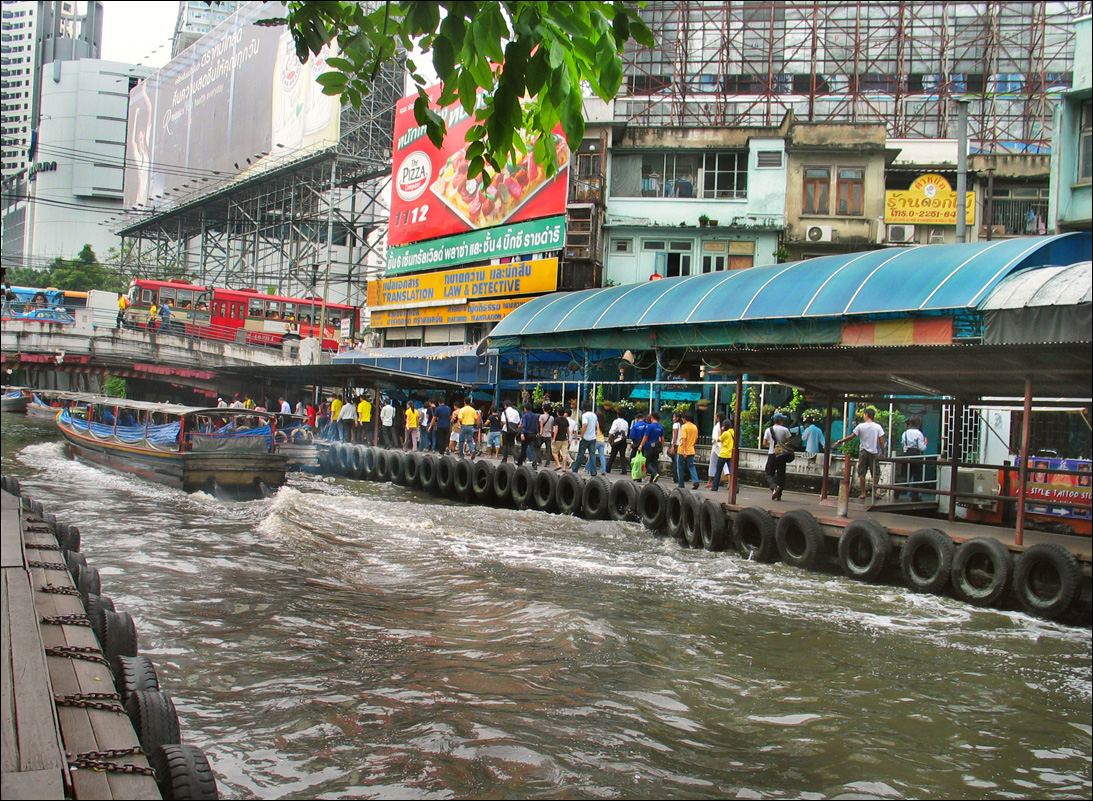
Pratunam pier, a transfer station between the western Golden Mount line and the eastern NIDA line

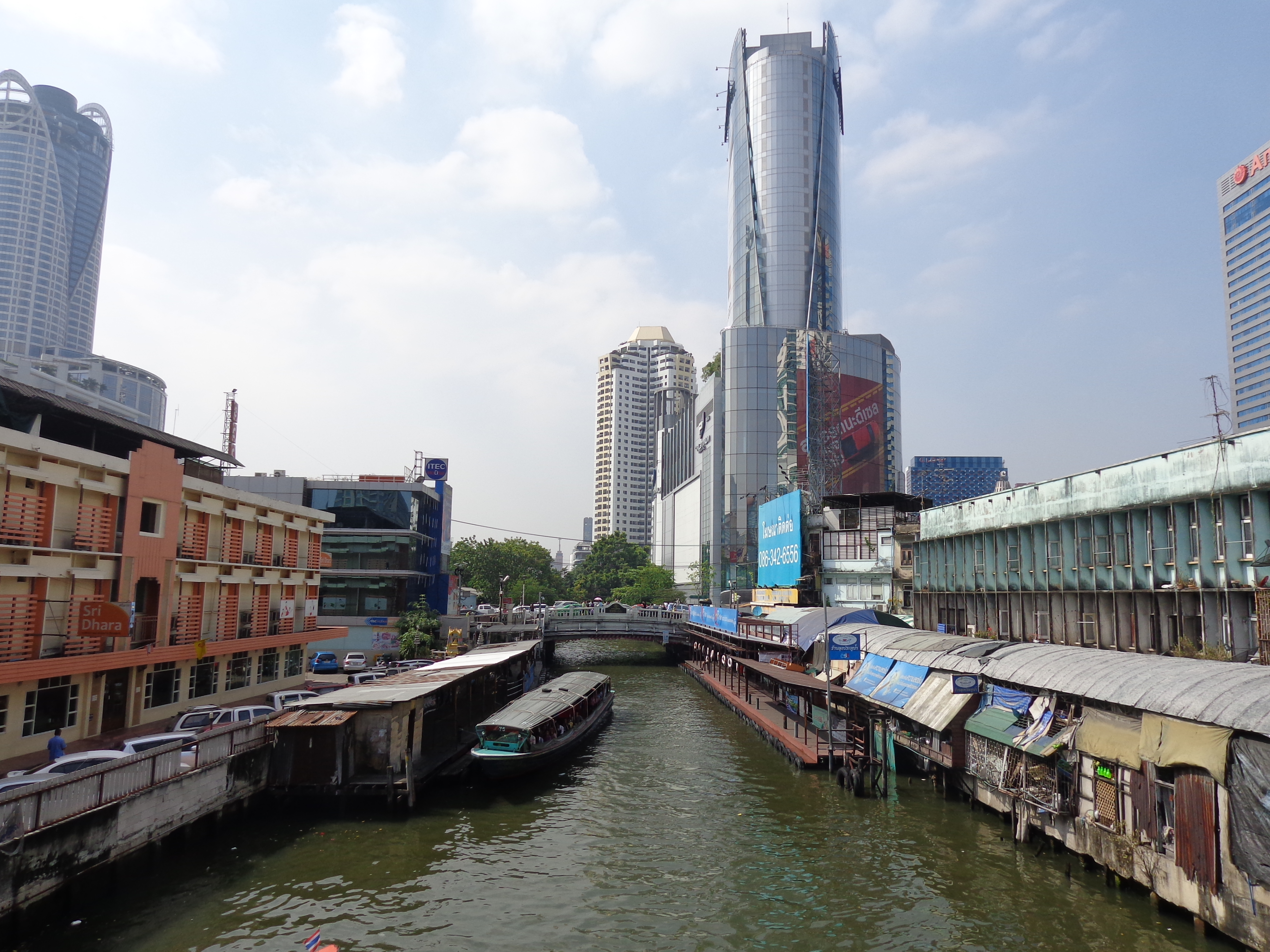
Pratunam pier seen from the western side

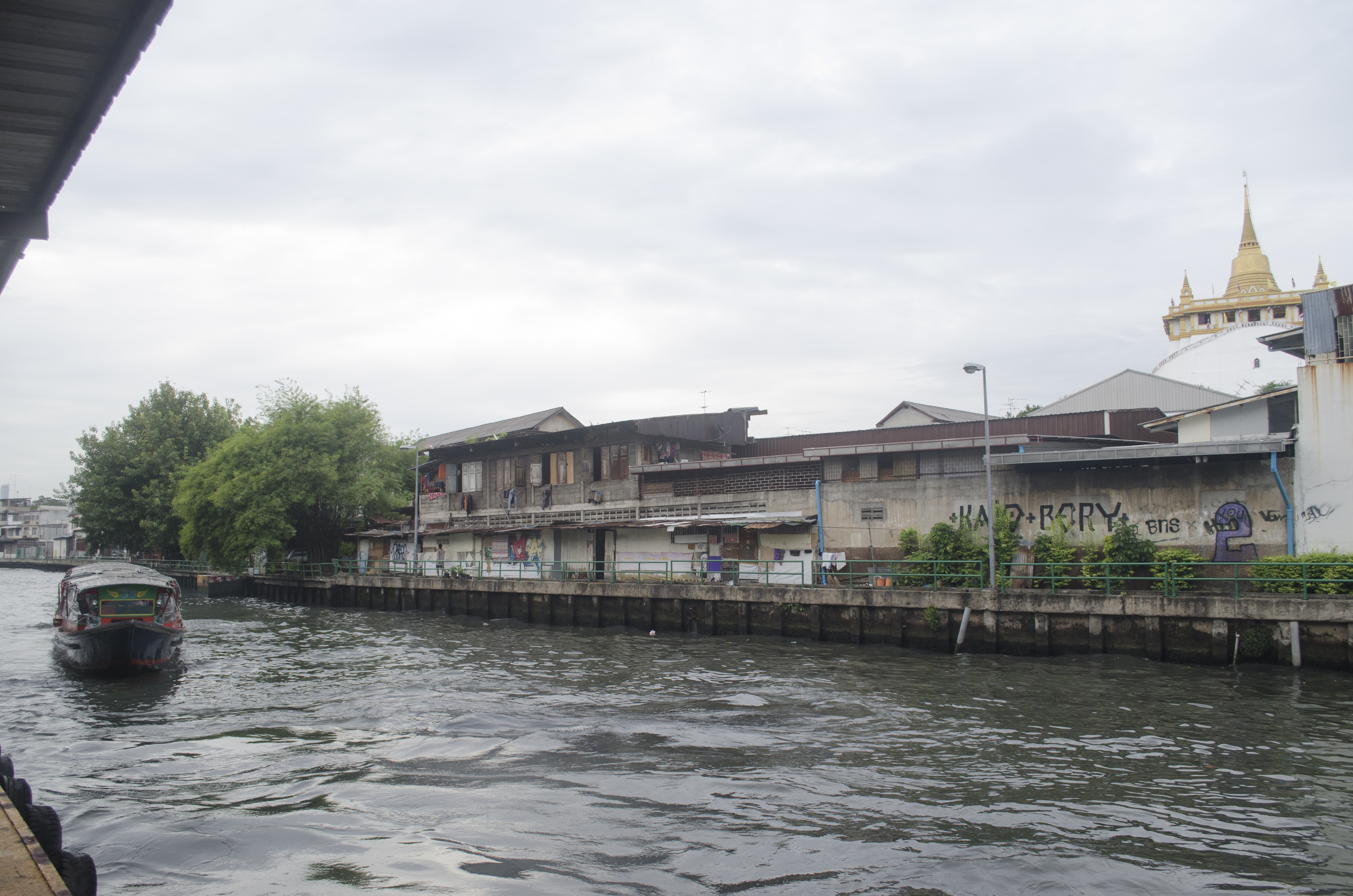
A boat approaches the Panfa Leelard pier, with Wat Saket on the right corner

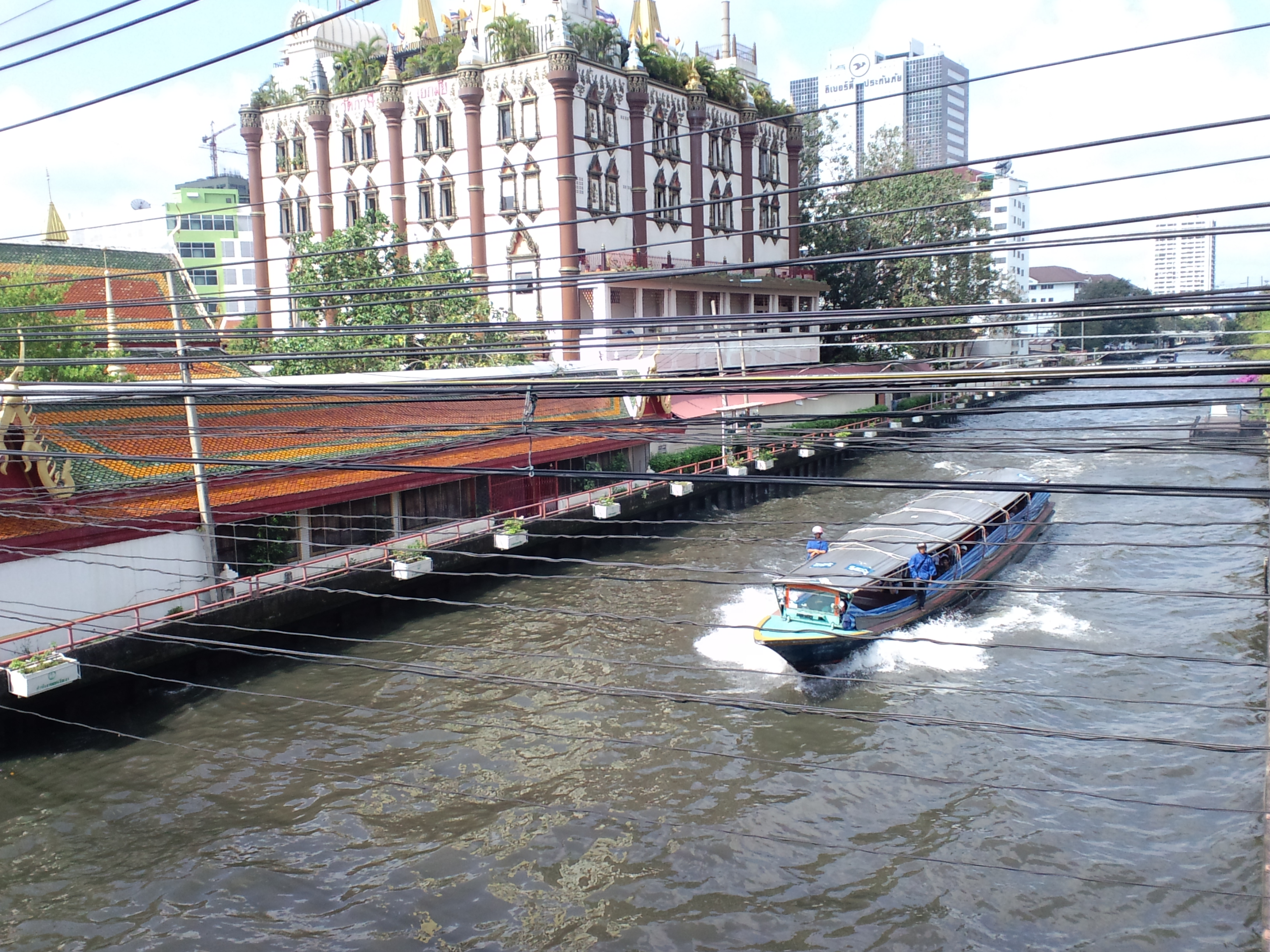
A boat passing by Wat Phra Si Mahathat, near Charn Issara pier

The Khlong Saen Saep boat service is a water bus operating on the Saen Saep Canal in Bangkok, Thailand. It has been in operation since 1 October 1990.

The 18-km route is served by 100 boats of 40–50 seats. It operates from 05:30 to 20:30 daily on weekdays and to 19:00 on weekends. Prices range from 8 to 22 baht. The service, run by a company called Family Transport, carries about 60,000 passengers each day.

On 25 February 2022, an extension of the old route was opened, with 12 modern, electric boats running from Wat Sriboonreung to the Min Buri district office. The extension follows a different timetable from the original service.

== Route ==
The service runs between Pom Prap Sattru Phai and Min Buri districts in Bangkok. The Pratunam pier in the Pathum Wan–Ratchathewi districts is a transfer station where passengers change between the western line, which ends at Wat Saket, and the eastern line, which ends at the National Institute of Development Administration (NIDA). Boats pass the Watthana and Huai Khwang districts, running parallel to Phetchaburi Road.

=== Golden Mount Line ===
1. Panfa Leelard – terminus, near Wat Saket and other attractions
2. Talat Bobae – Bobae Market
3. Saphan Charoenpol
4. Ban Krua Nuea
5. Saphan Hua Chang – near Bangkok Art and Culture Centre, MBK Center, and National Stadium and Siam BTS stations, and closest to Ratchathewi station.
6. Pratunam – interchange, near Pratunam Market, CentralWorld, and Pantip Plaza

=== NIDA Line ===
1. Pratunam – interchange, near Pratunam Market, CentralWorld, and Pantip Plaza
2. Chidlom – near Central Chidlom
3. Wireless – at Witthayu Road, near the old site of the British embassy
4. Nana Nuea (Sukhumvit Soi 3) – near Bumrungrad Hospital, "Little Africa" neighborhood
5. Nana Chard – Sukhumvit Soi 15
6. Asoke-Petchaburi – near Phetchaburi MRT station and the old site of the Japanese embassy
7. Prasanmit – at Srinakharinwirot University (Prasarn Mitr Campus)
8. Italthai – at Italthai Tower
9. Wat Mai Chonglom – near Royal City Avenue
10. Baan Don Mosque
11. Soi Thonglor
12. Charn Issara – at Charn Issara 2 Building, near Khlong Tan railway station and the entrance to Ekkamai Road (Sukhumvit Soi 63)
13. Vijit School
14. Sapan Klongtun – near the intersection of Petchaburi, Ramkhamhaeng, Pridi Banomyong (Sukhumvit Soi 71), and Phatthanakan roads, with BTS skytrain shuttle bus service.
15. The Mall Ram 3 – The Mall Ramkhamhaeng, near Rama IX Road intersection
16. Wat Noi
17. Ramkhamhaeng 29
18. Wat Thepleela – Soi Ramkhamhaeng 39
19. Ramkhamhaeng U – opposite Ramkhamhaeng University
20. Mahadthai – near Rajamangala National Stadium and Indoor Stadium Huamark
21. Wat Klang
22. The Mall Bang Kapi – The Mall Bangkapi on Lat Phrao Road
23. Bang Kapi – Bang Kapi district office and market
24. Wat Sriboonruang interchange – terminus, near NIDA.

=== Electric boat line ===
1. Wat Sriboonruang interchange
2. Prommitr Wittaya School
3. Paseo – The Paseo Town Mall
4. Seri Thai 26
5. Khlong Rahat
6. Romsai Village
7. Surao Daeng
8. Chumchon Lolae
9. Pratunam Bang Chan Tai
10. Pratunam Bang Chan Nuea
11. Talat Min Buri – Min Buri market
12. Min Buri District Office

== Fares and ticketing ==
The Khlong Saen Saep canal boat has a fare system that is directly tied to the current price of diesel. Tickets are bought onboard, using cash only. Ticketing works on an honour system.
