= Devakula family =

The Devakula family (Thai: เทวกุล, RTGS: Thewakun) is a Thai family descended from the Chakri Dynasty. Its progenitor is the Prince Devawongse Varoprakarn, a son of King Mongkut.

== People ==
Notable people with the surname include:

- Nattakorn Devakula (born 1976), Thai host and television moderator
- Pridiyathorn Devakula (born 1947), Thai economist
- Thepkamol Devakula (born 1936), Thai Ambassador to France and Burma
