= List of shopping malls in Bangkok =

The following is a list of notable shopping malls in Bangkok, Thailand:

Contents

0-9 @ A B C D E F G H I J K L M N O P Q R S T U V W X Y Z

See also – References – External links

== A ==
- Asiatique, Saphan Taksin BTS Station

== B ==
- Bangkok Mall, Bangna

== C ==
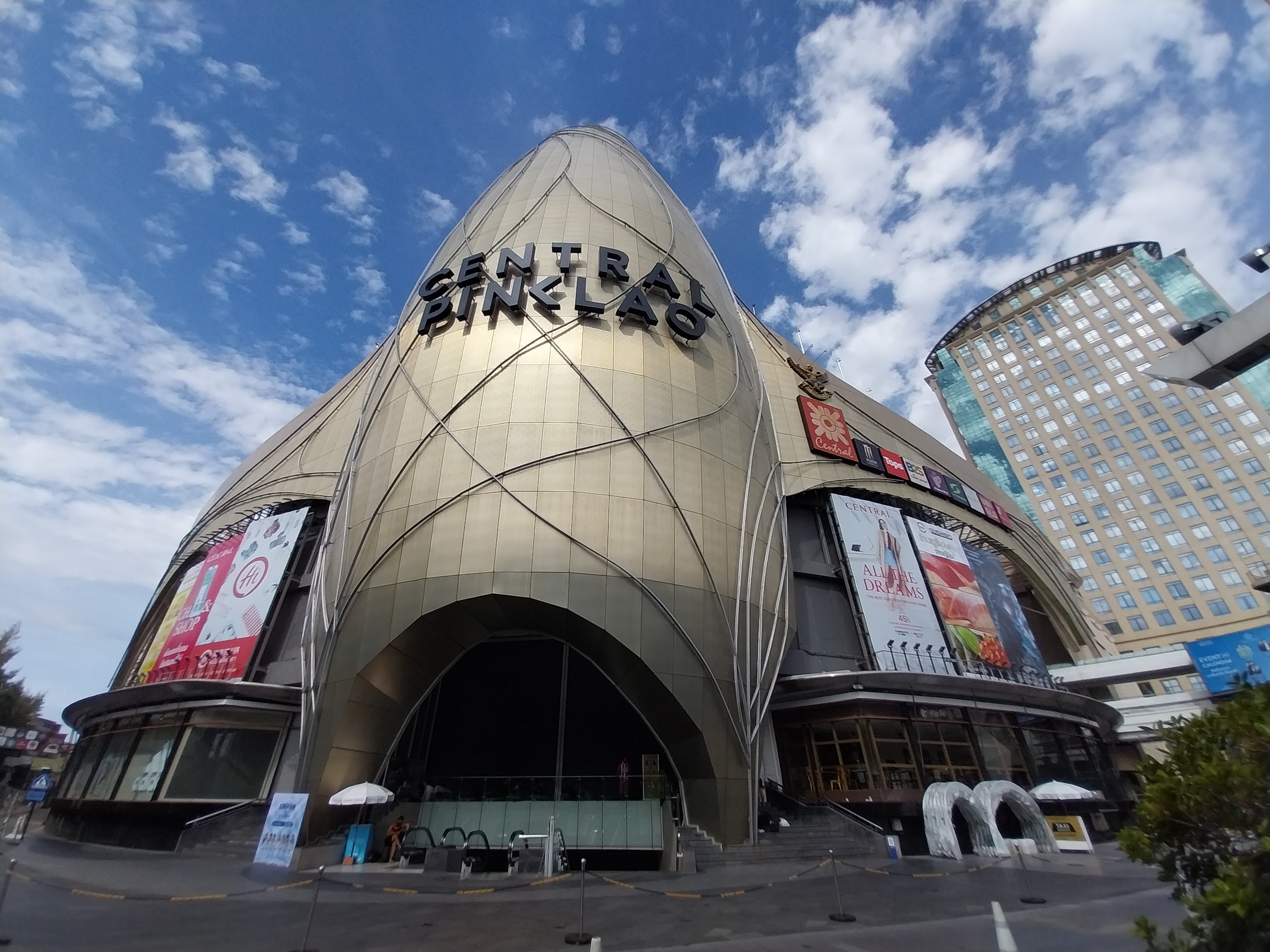
Central Pinklao

- Century The Movie Plaza, Victory Monument
- Century The Movie Plaza Sukhumvit, On Nut BTS station
- Central Bangna, Bang Na
- CenTRal cENtrAL, Siam Square, Pathum Wan
- Central Chaengwattana, Pak Kret
- Central Eastville, Pradit Manutham Road
- Central Embassy, Phloenchit
- Central GR9, Rama IX Road, Ratchadaphisek Road
- Central Ladprao, Lat Phrao Intersection
- Central NorthVille, Rattanathibet Road
- Central Pinklao, Barommarat Chachonnani Road, Bangkok Noi
- Central Rama 2, Rama II Road
- Central Rama 3, Rama III Road
- Central Ramindra, Ram Inthra Road
- Central WestGate, Nonthaburi
- Central WestVille, Ratchaphruek Road
- CentralWorld, Siam area
- Chamchuri Square, Sam Yan
- The Crystal SB Ratchaphruek, Ratchaphruek Road
- The Central Phaholyothin (Opened in 2027)

== D ==
- Dusit Central Park, Sala Daeng

== E ==
- Emporium, Sukhumvit Road
- EmQuartier, Sukhumvit Road
- EmSphere, Sukhumvit Road
- Esplanade, Thailand Cultural Centre

== F ==
- Fashion Island, Ram Inthra Road
- Future Park Rangsit, Rangsit

== G ==
- Gateway at Bangsue, Pracha Rat Sai 2 Road
- Gateway at Ekamai, Sukhumvit Road
- Gaysorn Village, Ratchaprasong
- Gaysorn Amarin, Ratchaprasong

== I ==
- Iconsiam, Khlong San
- ICS, Khlong San
- I'm Chinatown, Chinatown
- I'm Park Chula
- Imperial World Samrong, Samrong Nuea

== J ==
- J.J Mall, Chatuchak

== M ==
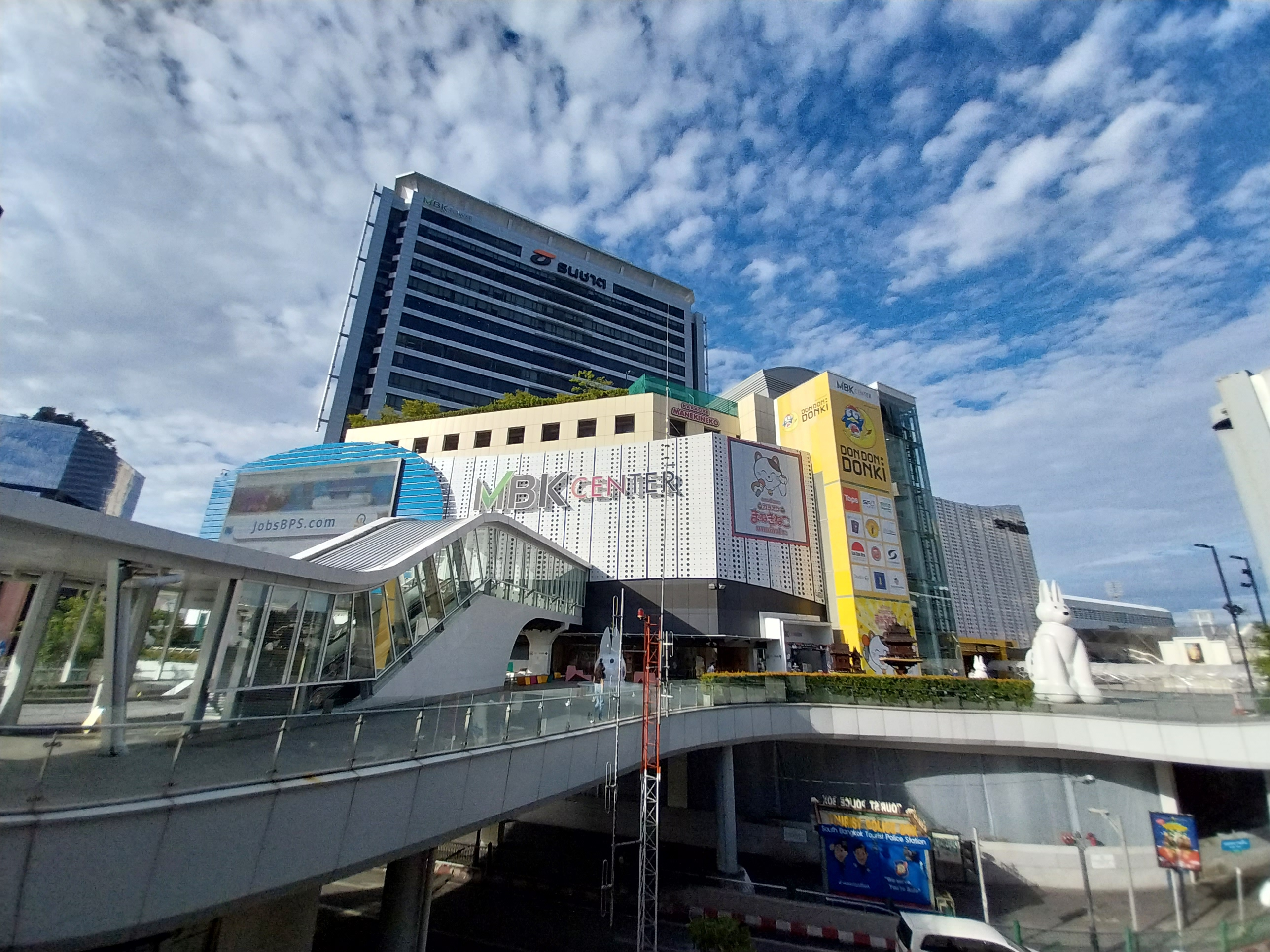
MBK Center

- Marché Thonglor, Thong Lo
- MBK Center, Pathum Wan Intersection
- Mega Bangna, Bangna
- The Mall Lifestore Thaphra
- The Mall Lifestore Ngamwongwan
- The Mall Lifestore Bangkhae
- The Mall Lifestore Bangkapi

== N ==
- The Nightingale-Olympic, Phra Nakhon
- The Nine Center Tiwanon

== O ==
- The Old Siam Plaza, Phahurat
- One Bangkok Retail, Pathumwan

== P ==
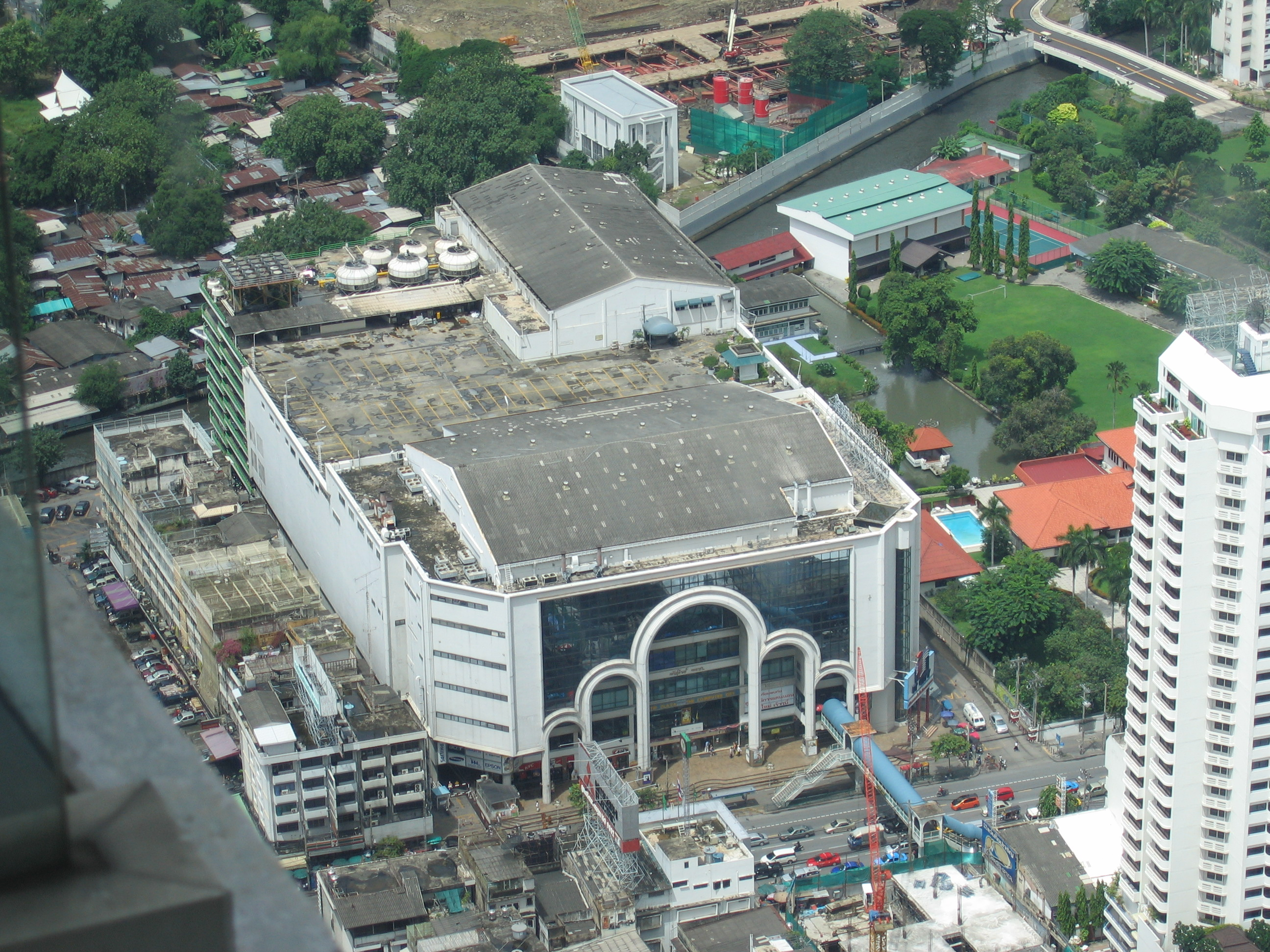
Pantip Plaza

- PLATF@RM, Wongwian Yai
- The Pantip at Ngamwongwan
- Pantip Plaza (now PHENIX), Pratunam
- Paradise Park, Srinakharin Road
- The Paseo Park Kanchanaphisek, Kanchanaphisek Road
- Platinum Fashion Mall, Pratunam
- Platinum Palais, Pratunam
- Palladium World, Pratunam

== R ==
- River City Shopping Complex, Bangrak, Bangkok
- Robinson Samutprakan
- Robinson Srisaman, Pak Kret, Nonthaburi
- Robinson Suvarnabhumi, Ladkrabang Road, Bangkok
- Robinson Ratchaphruek, Pak Kret, Nonthaburi

== S ==
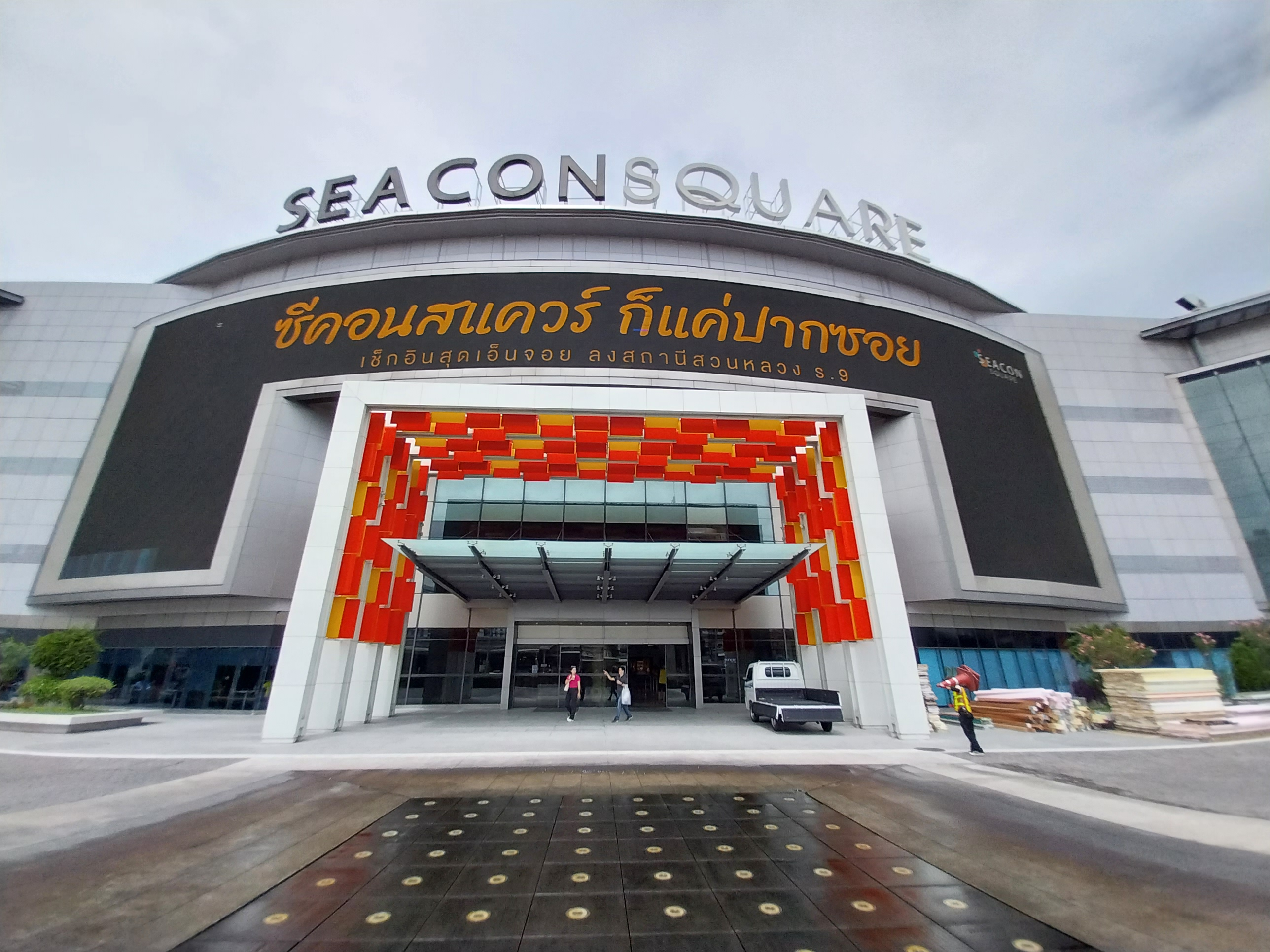
Seacon Square

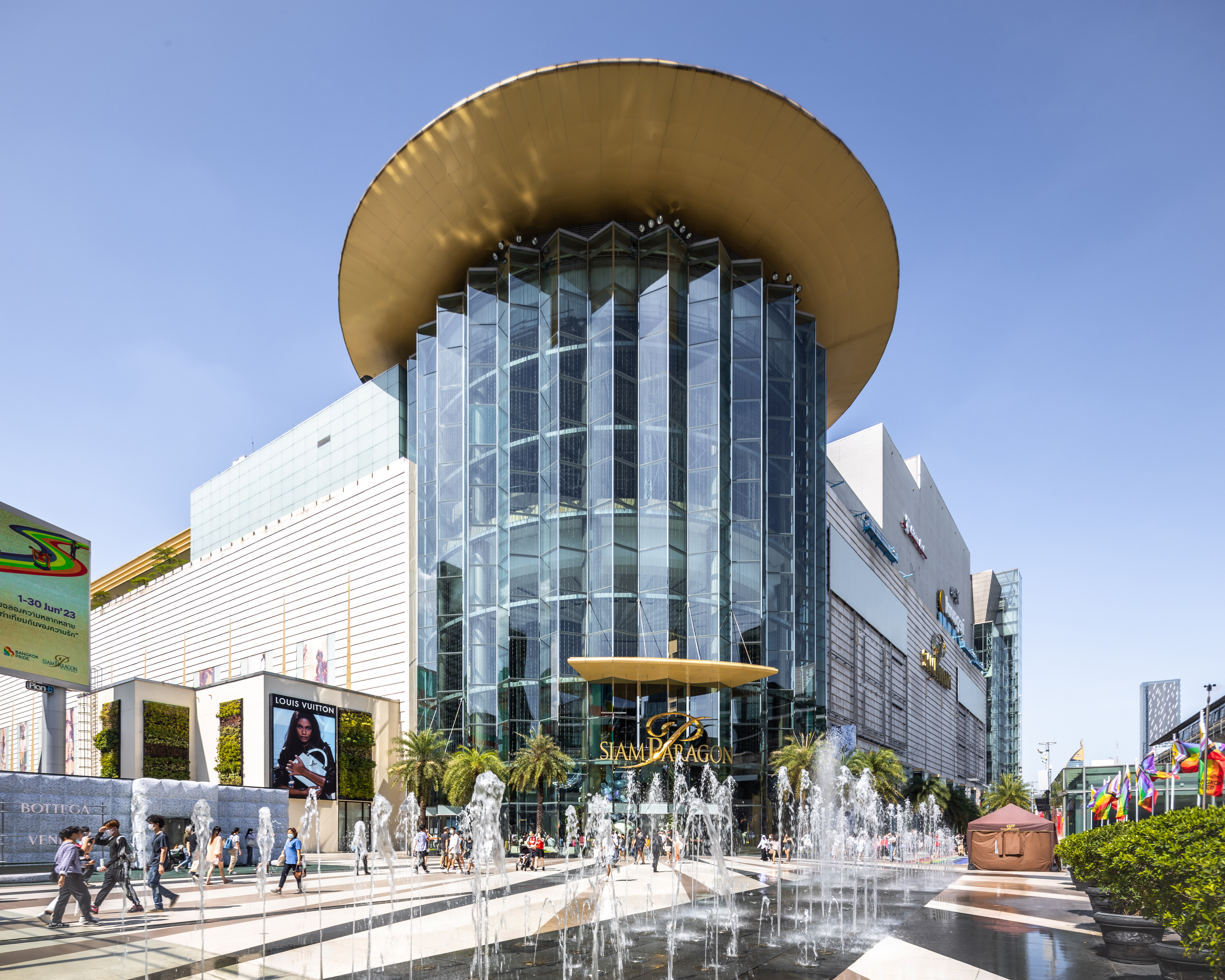
Siam Paragon

- Samyan Mitrtown, Sam Yan
- SCB Park Plaza, Chatuchak
- Seacon Bangkae, Phetkasem Road
- Seacon Square, Srinakharin Road
- Siam Center, Siam Square
- Siam Paragon, Chaloem Phao
- Siam Discovery, Phayathai Road
- Siam Square One, Siam Square
- Silom Complex, Sala Daeng BTS station
- Supreme Complex, Samsen Road
- The Street, Ratchadaphisek Road
- 1981 Soul Sold, Ramkamhaeng

== T ==
- Terminal 21 Asok
- Terminal 21 Rama III
- Tree on 3, Bang Kho Laem
- Thaniya Shopping Center, Sala Daeng BTS station

== U ==
- Union Mall, Lat Phrao Road

== W ==
- The Walk Ratchaphruek, Ratchaphruek Road
- Watergate Pavillion, Pratunam

== Y ==
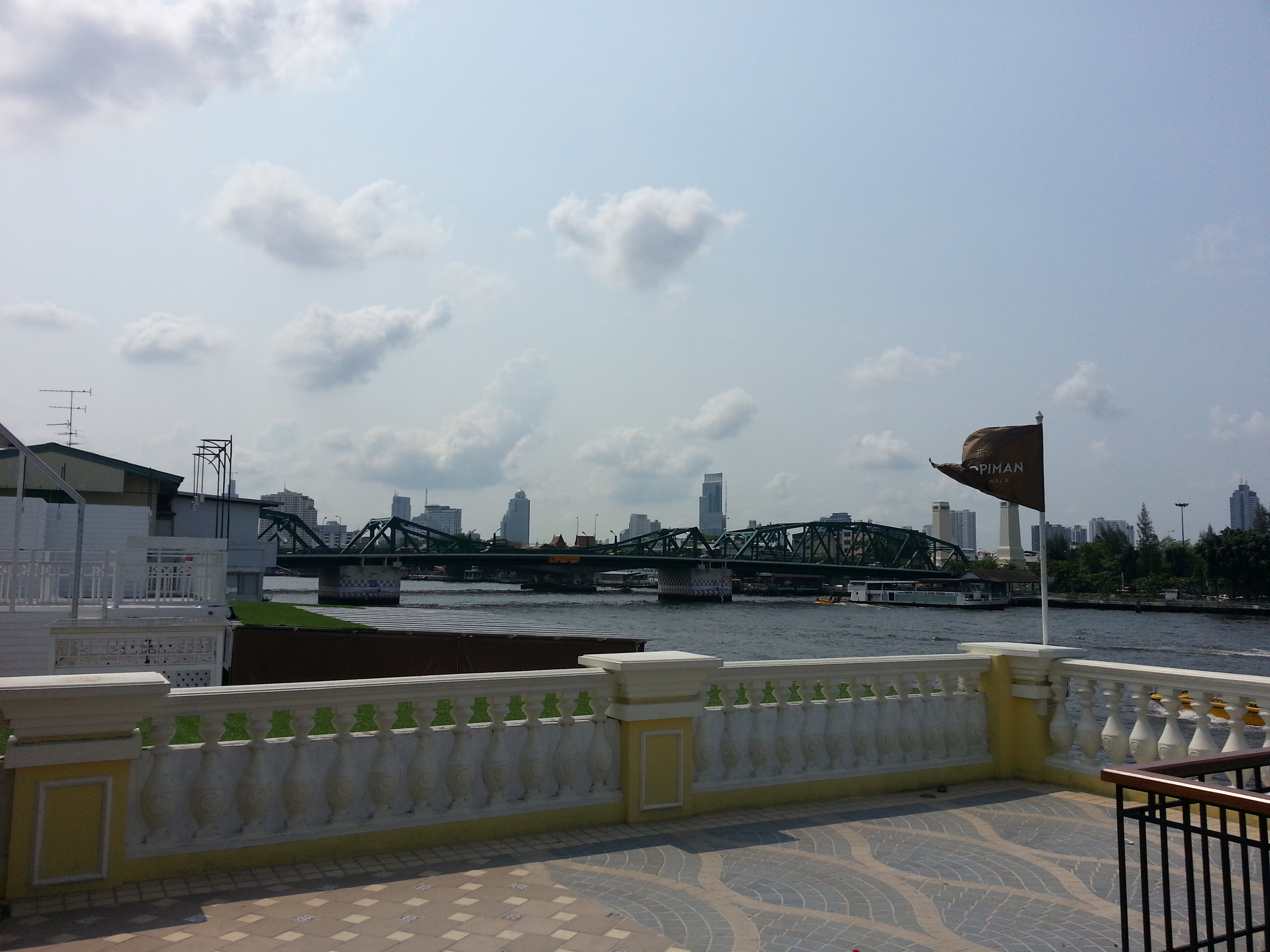
Terrace of Yodpiman River Walk, Memorial Bridge is ahead

- Yodpiman River Walk, Pak Khlong Talat

== Z ==
- Zeer Rangsit

== See also ==
- List of shopping malls in Thailand
