= Lam Sali =

Coordinates: 13°45′45.80″N 100°38′44.23″E

- ลำสาลี

Location
- Hua Mak, Bang Kapi, Bangkok
- Roads at junction: Srinagarindra (north–south); Ramkhamhaeng (east–west)

Construction
- Type: Four-way at-grade intersection and overpass with footbridge

Lam Sali (Thai: ลำสาลี, pronounced [lām sǎːlīː]) is a four-way intersection in Hua Mak subdistrict, Bang Kapi district, Bangkok. It is also the name of the surrounding area.

It is an intersection of Ramkhamhaeng and Srinagarindra roads, located not far The Mall Bang Kapi.

Its name is derived from the distortion of "Lam Ta Samli" (ลำตาสำลี, lit. 'the old Samli's track, or Mr. Samli's track'). In earlier times, this area was a rural countryside of waterways, such as Khlong Saen Saep, surrounded by rice fields and wood groves, collectively known as "Thung Bang Kapi" (ทุ่งบางกะปิ, lit. 'Bang Kapi Field'), and was home to a Muslim community. There lived an old man named "To Kili" (โต๊ะกีลี), also known as "Ta Samli" (ตาสำลี), whose occupation was raising buffalo for the locals. He often herded them to graze in front of Yamee-Unmuttageen Mosque, which still stands today. Over time, the fields became worn smooth, forming a visible track. This path was called "Lam Ta Samli", which eventually evolved into the modern name, "Lam Sali."

The Lam Sali intersection had extreme traffic jams beginning December 7, 2018, when the Lam Sali overpass (only inbound side) was closed for one year due to the construction of the MRT Orange Line.
