= Platinum Fashion Mall =

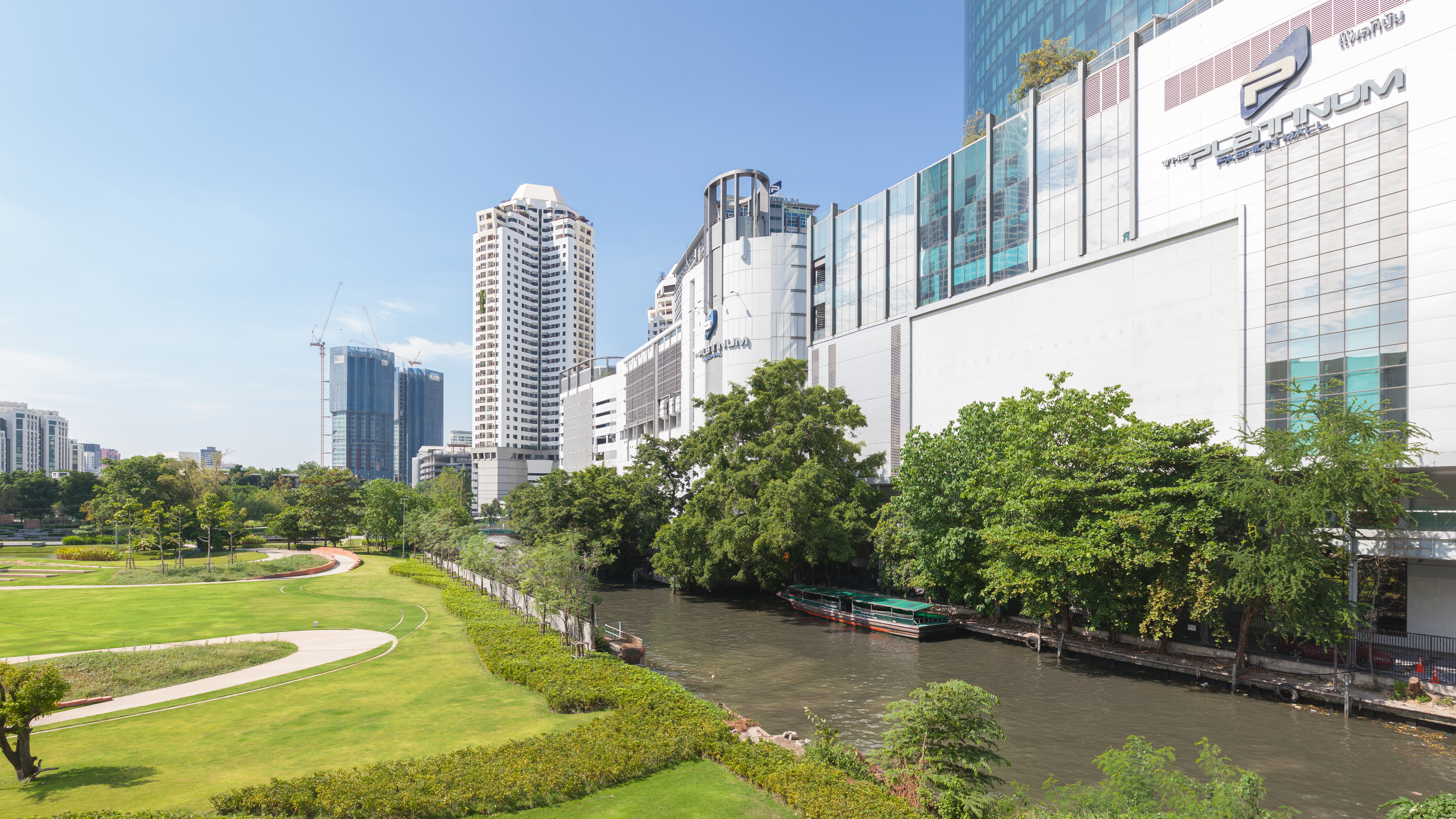
- Location: Pratunam, Bangkok, Thailand
- Coordinates: 13°45′0″N 100°32′22″E
- Address: Phetchaburi Road
- Opened: 2000
- Num. of anchor tenants: 6

The Platinum Fashion Mall is a five billion baht (US$148 million) shopping mall in Pratunam, Bangkok, Thailand, which specializes in fashion clothes and accessories retail and wholesale. It is a six-storey complex with an 11-storey condominium building above the complex.

The mall is located on Phetchaburi Road, next to Pantip Plaza and opposite Pratunam Complex, a 14-storey mall. It is also near CentralWorld. Platinum 2, on the grounds next to Platinum 1, was completed in March 2011.

Platinum Fashion Mall consists of 7 floors of shopping floors (named from basement floor- Ginza, Soho, Oxford, Nathan, Camden, Orchard and Food Center).

== Floor Directory ==
Ginza (Basement Floor)	Jeans & Fashion Clothes
Soho (1st Floor)	Information Counter & Women Fashion Clothes
Oxford (2nd Floor)	Women Fashion Clothes
Nathan (3rd Floor)	Women & Men Fashion Clothes
Camden (4th Floor)	Men Fashion Clothes & Leathers
Orchard (5th Floor)	Children, Leathers & Accessories
Food Center (6th Floor)	Food & Beverage
7th-10th Floor	Car park & cargo
11th Floor	Inventory store and the Platinum Fashion Mall office
12th-23rd floor	The Platinum condominium

The mall are separated into 3 zones (Zone 1,2&3), and each row of shoplots are clearly marked (to easily navigate around the building). Information Counters are located at each entrances of the mall. ATMs and mobile top-up machines are available everywhere in the mall.

== Operating Hours ==
- Monday, Tuesday, Thursday & Friday : 09:00 till 20:00
- Saturday, Sunday & Wednesday : 08:00 till 20:00

== See also ==
- List of shopping malls in Bangkok
- List of shopping malls in Thailand
