= Ramkhamhaeng Road =

Street in Bangkok, Thailand

Coordinates: 13.741103°N 100.600986°E

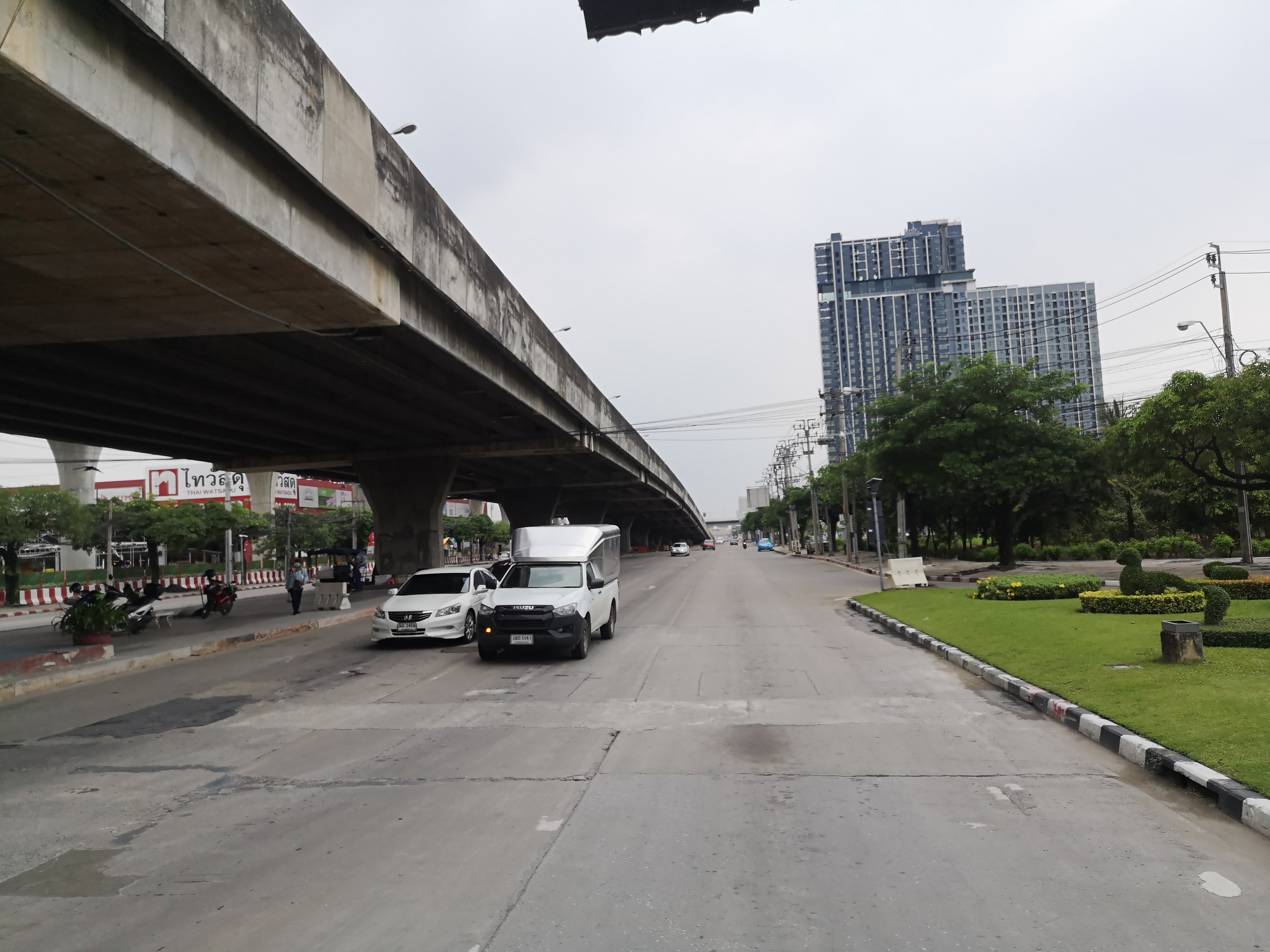
Ramkhamhaeng Road at Ramkhamhaeng–Rom Klao Intersection.

Ramkhamhaeng Road (Thai: ถนนรามคำแหง, pronounced [tʰā.nǒn rāːm.kʰām.hɛ̌ːŋ]) is a main road in eastern Bangkok, Thailand. It's named after Ramkhamhaeng University (RU), Thailand's first open university that it runs through. The name is also the surrounding area.

== Route ==
It can be divided into two phases:

=== First phase ===
The road starts at Khlong Tan Intersection in Suan Luang District, where it cuts with Phetchaburi, Soi Sukhumvit 71 (Pridi Banomyong Road), and Phatthanakan Roads, as a continuation of Pridi Banomyong Road. Then northeastward through Ramkhamhaeng Intersection, where it cuts across Rama IX Road, through the entrance of Wat Thepleela temple and Ramkhamhaeng University, Sports Authority of Thailand (location of Rajamangala National Stadium and Indoor Stadium Huamark), up until ends at Lam Sali Intersection in Bang Kapi District near Bang Kapi District Office and Tha Mall Bangkapi. It is about 6 km (3.7 mi) long.

This first phase is considered a road in the downtown. There is an overpass along the road direction from Soi Ramkhamhaeng 13 in front of The Mall Ramkhamhaeng up until Soi Ramkhamhaeng 81/4. Only this phase is one of Bangkok's busiest traffic areas.

Two shortcuts to Phlapphla Subdistrict in Wang Thonglang District were Soi Ramkhamhaeng 39 or Soi Wat Thepleela, the location of Wat Thepleela and former site of Wang Thonglang District Office; and Soi Ramkhamhaeng 65 or Soi Mahadthai which crosses the Khlong Saen Saeb canal lead to Lat Phrao Road in the opposite side of Ladprao General Hospital, where it is referred to as Soi Lat Phrao 122.

=== Second phase ===
This phase was formerly known as "Sukhaphiban 3 Road" (ถนนสุขาภิบาล 3). It continued to run from Lam Sali Intersection, where it cuts across Srinagarindra Road (Highway 3344), then northeastward cuts with Puang Siri Road through Ban Ma Junction, where it cuts across Si Burapha Road, then into Saphan Sung District, it cuts across Kanchanaphisek Road (Outer Ring Road) and entering Min Buri District through Lat Bua Khao Junction, where it cuts across Min Phatthana Road and Soi Ramkhamhaeng 172, then it through Ramkhamhaeng-Rom Klao Intersection, where it meet Rom Klao Road, up until the end at Ramkhamhaeng-Suwinthawong Junction, where it merge Suwinthawong Road (Highway 304), the distance is about 12 km (7.5 mi). Only this phase is considered the road running through the suburbs of Bangkok.

The length of both phases is 18 km (11.2 mi) long.

Famous places along the road include Thailand's largest football stadium Rajamangala National Stadium, Wat Sriboonreung and Wat Bang Peng Tai temples (location of Khwan Riam Floating Market), Ruamrudee International School (RIS).

== Transportation ==
- Min Buri MRT station the terminal of MRT Pink Line
- MRT Orange Line (under construction)
