= 2009 Bangkok gubernatorial election =

- 11 January 2009
- Turnout: 51.1%
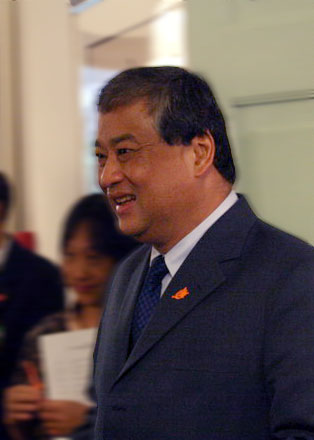

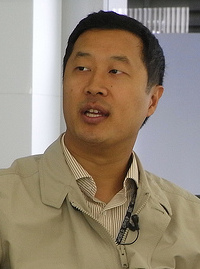
Candidate	Sukhumbhand Paribatra	Yuranun Pamornmontri
Party	Democrat	Pheu Thai
Popular vote	934,602	611,669
Percentage	44.41%	29.06%
Candidate	Nattakorn Devakula	Kaewsan Atibodhi
Party	Independent	Krung Thep Mai
Popular vote	334,846	144,779
Percentage	15.91%	6.88%
- Gubernatorial election results map. Blue denotes districts won by Paribatra, Red denotes those won by Pamornmontri.
Governor before election
Apirak Kosayothin
Democrat
Elected Governor
Sukhumbhand Paribatra
Democrat

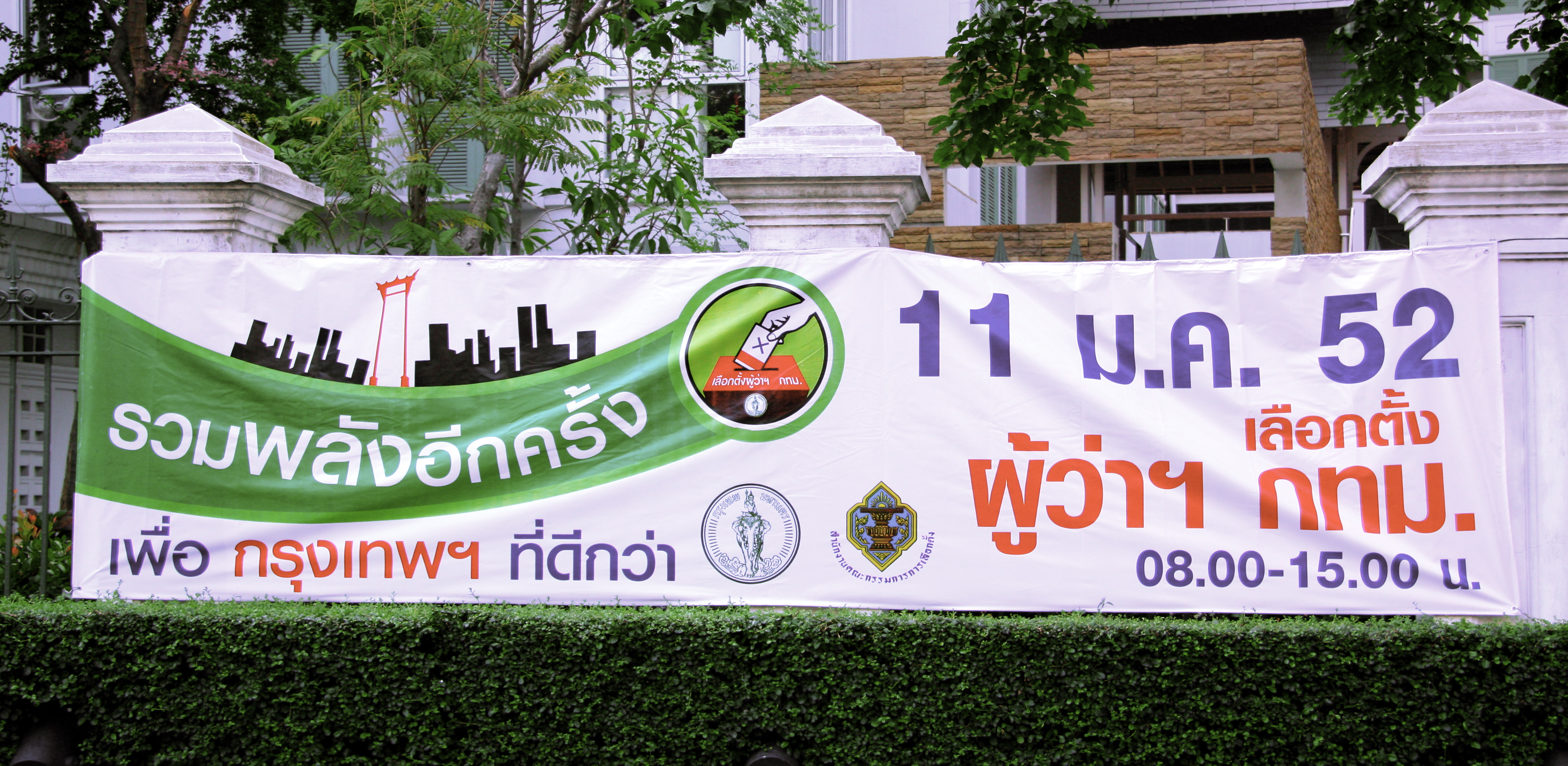
Poster promoting the 2009 elections "Unite our powers once more, for a better Bangkok".

The 2009 Bangkok gubernatorial election took place on 11 January 2009, this was the ninth election for the governorship of Bangkok. The election was held after the resignation of the incumbent governor Apirak Kosayothin on 13 November 2008, shortly after he was re-elected for a second term on 5 October 2008. M.R. Sukhumbhand Paribata, the Democrat party candidate, won the election and became the 15th governor of Bangkok.

On 13 November 2008, Governor Apirak announced his resignation saying: "Like the Democrat Party, I support a move that will perpetuate politics-for-people" at the same time maintaining his innocence and stating that his resignation should become an example of a change in Thai politics. His resignation stemmed from an indictment by the National Counter Corruption Commission (NCCC), in which Apirak was indicted for the controversial 6.6 billion Baht fire-engine procurement contract. The former Prime Minister and former Bangkok Governor Samak Sundaravej was also found guilty in the same verdict. This triggered an automatic by-election.

== Campaign ==
On 1 December, the Election Commission allowed the registration of candidates. A total of 14 candidates registered. In accordance with the law, they picked numbers by which they would be assigned for the campaign. The three highest profile candidates were: MR Sukhumbhand Paribatra, ML Nattakorn Devakula and Yuranun Pamornmontri.

MR Sukhumbhand Paribatra, the 56-year-old candidate of the Democrat Party, is a former Foreign Minister. MR Sukhumband vowed to carry on with policies initiated by Governor Apirak and to continue the environmentalist agenda. He ran under the slogan: "Bring back Bangkokians' smiles".

ML Nattakorn Devakula, a 32-year-old Independent candidate, was a former TV host, popularly known as "Khun Pluem". He ran on the slogan: "Vote for me. Vote for the governor of the future".

Yuranun Pamornmontri, the 45-year-old Puea Thai Party candidate, is a popular TV actor and film star.

== Media ==
Election posters of the Candidates:

== Results ==
The election and results were announced on the same day:

Candidate	Party	Votes	%
Sukhumbhand Paribatra	Democrat Party	934,602	44.41
Yuranun Pamornmontri	Pheu Thai Party	611,669	29.06
Nattakorn Devakula	Independent	334,846	15.91
Kaewsan Atibhoti	Krung Thep Mai Group	144,779	6.88
Leena Jungjanja	Independent	9,043	0.43
Sumeth Thanasirikul	Independent	6,017	0.29
A-that Monsereenusorn	Suvarnabhumi Party	4,117	0.20
Withaya Jangkobpatthana	Independent	3,640	0.17
Kongchak Jaidee	Independent	2,400	0.11
Dharmachat Rungjiroj	Independent	2,222	0.11
Thoranee Ritthithamrong	Independent	1,875	0.09
Metta Temchamnarn	Independent	1,431	0.07
Issara Amornwet	Independent	922	0.04
Udom Vibundhevachart	Independent	656	0.03
None of the above		46,395	2.20
Total		2,104,614	100.00
Valid votes		2,104,614	99.24
Invalid/blank votes		16,107	0.76
Total votes		2,120,721	100.00
Registered voters/turnout		4,150,103	51.10
