= Khlong Tan =

Road intersection in Bangkok, Thailand

Coordinates: 13°44′27.56″N 100°36′02.82″E

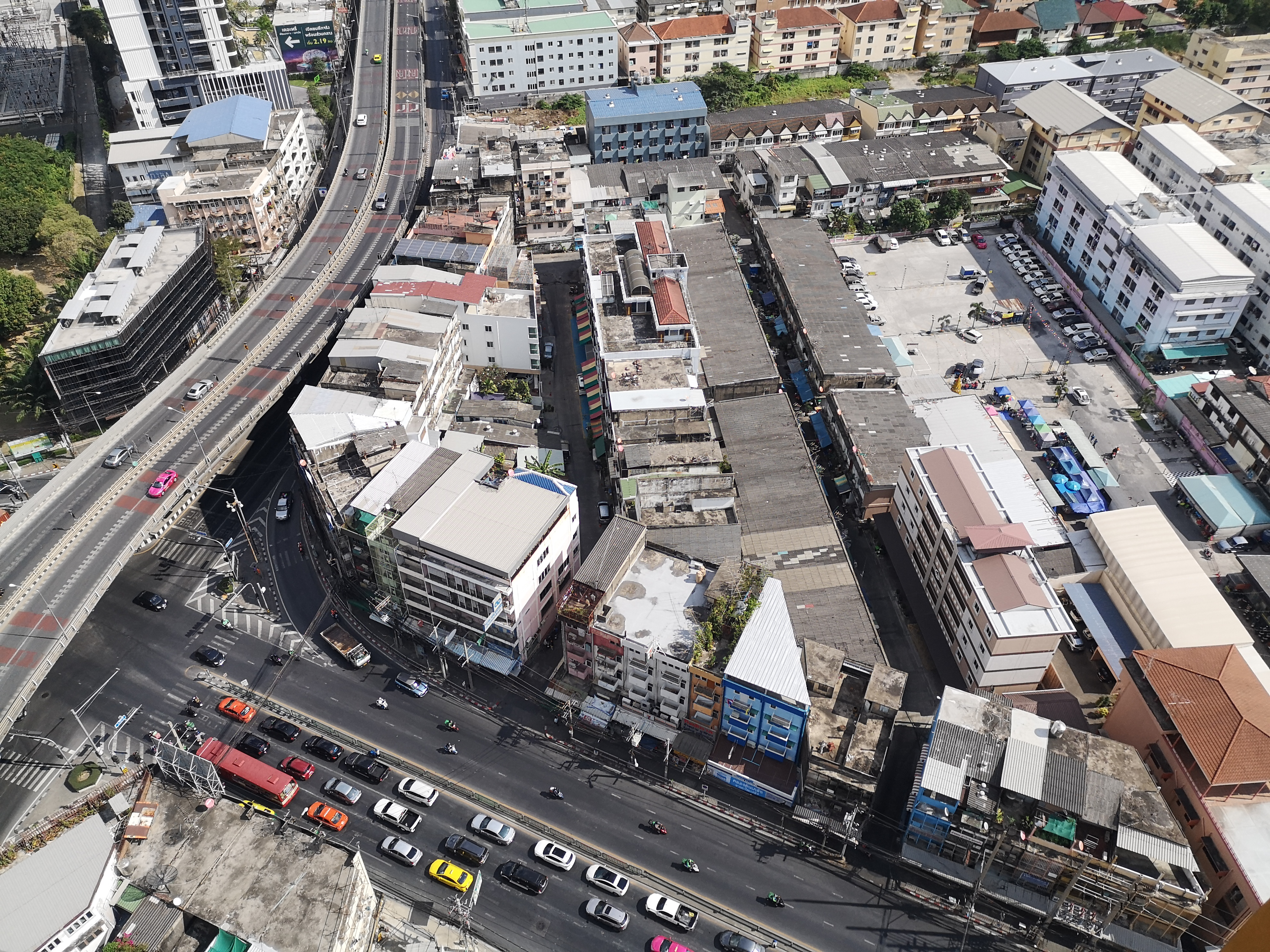
Aerial view of Khlong Tan intersection

Khlong Tan (Thai: คลองตัน, pronounced [kʰlɔ̄ːŋ tān]) is an intersection and its surrounding neighbourhood in Bangkok's Suan Luang sub-district, Suan Luang district.

== History ==
Khlong Tan is a minor tributary of Khlong Saen Saep, which connects to Khlong Phra Khanong (now considered part of Khlong Saen Saep). This canal flows through the area and is the longest in Thailand, stretching about 72 km (44.7 mi) from downtown Bangkok to the eastern province of Chachoengsao.

Khlong Saen Saep was excavated during the reign of King Nangklao (Rama III) in the early Rattanakosin period. Most of the labourers were Muslims from southern Thailand and the Malay Peninsula. After the canal was completed, the king allowed them to settle along its length, starting from the present-day Bobae neighbourhood, located in what is now Pom Prap Sattru Phai district and continuing further along the canal.

It is believed that the name "Khlong Tan" is a corrupted form of "Kalantan" (กลันตัน, pronounced [klan.tân]), referring to Kelantan State in Malaysia, which was the homeland of many of the canal workers.

The canal is divided into two sections. The first is Khlong Saen Saep Tai (lit. 'South Saen Saep'), also known as Khlong Bang Kapi, which ends at Khlong Tan. The second section is Khlong Saen Saep Nuea (lit. 'North Saen Saep'), which continues from Khlong Tan and runs all the way to Chachoengsao province, where it joins the Bang Pakong River.

== Characteristics ==
It is the point where Phetchaburi Road (specifically the New Phetchaburi section) and Soi Sukhumvit 71 (Pridi Banomyong Road), two major roads running eastward and northward from downtown, come to an end. It also marks the beginning of Phatthanakan and Ramkhamhaeng Roads. An overpass runs in the Phetchaburi–Phatthanakan direction.

Khlong Tan originally formed a three-way junction where the ends of Phetchaburi, Ramkhamhaeng, and Pridi Banomyong Roads met. The expansion of Phatthanakan Road in 1976 transformed it into the four-way intersection seen today.

== Transportation ==
The area is served by Ramkhamhaeng station (A5) of the State Railway of Thailand (SRT), which is part of the Airport Rail Link (ARL) line. The Khlong Saen Saep boat service also passes through the area, with boats stopping to pick up passengers at Sapan Klongtun pier (E13), located near the intersection.

== Accidents ==
In 2019, the overpass became the site of several fatal accidents involving motorcyclists driving at high speeds. Three people died at the same spot within just a few months.
