= Nattakorn Devakula =

Thai host and television moderator

Mom Luang Nattakorn Devakula
- ณัฏฐกรณ์ เทวกุล
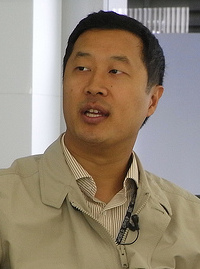
- Nattakorn Devakula in 2009
- Born: Nattakorn Devakula; 10 September 1976 (age 50); Bangkok, Thailand
- Other name: Pluem
- Education: UW–Madison; Johns Hopkins University
- Occupations: Journalist; news presenter; singer; master of ceremonies; army officer
- Height: 1.85 m (6 ft 1 in)
- Spouse: Jacqueline Apithananon (m. 2010)
- Parents: Pridiyathorn Devakula (father); Polin Inthasukit (mother)

Nattakorn Devakula

Military service
- Allegiance: Thailand
- Branch/service: Royal Thai Army
- Years of service: 1997–2001
- Rank: Sub Lieutenant
- Commands: Directorate of Intelligence, Royal Thai Army

Mom Luang Nattakorn Devakula (Thai: ณัฏฐกรณ์ เทวกุล; nicknamed Pleum b. 10 September 1976) is a Thai host and television moderator. He is a former candidate of the 2009 Bangkok gubernatorial election.

== History ==
Devakula is the son of Mom Rajawongse Pridiyathorn Devakula, former governor of the Bank of Thailand.

Nattakorn married Natrada Apitananon, or "Jacqueline" or "Jacqui" actor luk khrueng Thai-Canada on 7 October 2010. His son's name is Kritkuntorn Devakula Na Ayuttaya or Jame.

== Education ==
- Primary school: Srinakharinwirot University Prasarnmit Demonstration School (elementary/secondary)
- Secondary education: Aloha High School
- Bachelor : Political science University of Wisconsin–Madison
- Master's : Johns Hopkins University

== Work ==
=== Agencies ===
- 1997–2001 Interpreter and draftsman at Directorate of Intelligence, Royal Thai Army

=== Journalism work ===
- Economic Time (TNN24)
- Wake up Thailand / Wake Up News (Voice TV)
- The Daily Dose (Voice TV)
- Cooking with Jacqui (Voice TV)
- Pluem Explore! (Voice TV)
- Talking Thailand (Voice TV)
- Tonight Thailand (Voice TV)

=== Advertising endorsements ===
- Nissan Tiida
- Salz toothpaste

=== Movie ===
- SOUL'S CODE (2008) role by Ganon
