= Pratunam =

Neighborhood in Bangkok, Thailand

Coordinates: 13°44′59.87″N 100°32′27.93″E

- ประตูน้ำ
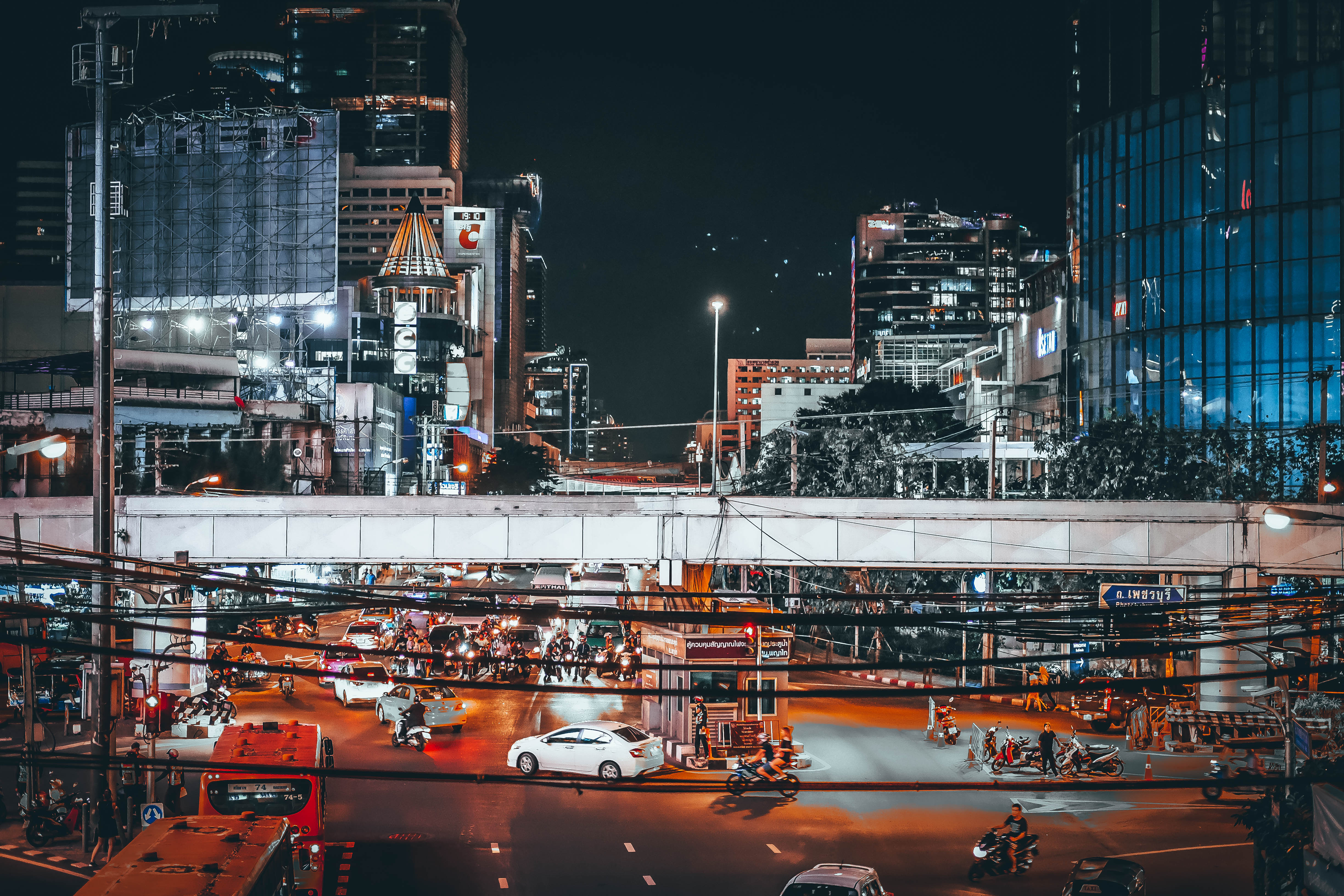
- Pratunam intersection in nighttime (seen from Ratchaprarop side)
- Interactive map of Pratunam

Location
- Thanon Phaya Thai, Ratchathewi, Bangkok, Thailand
- Roads at junction: Ratchaprarop (north); Phetchaburi (east–west); Ratchadamri (south)

Construction
- Type: Four-way at-grade intersection with bidirectional overpass

Pratunam (Thai: ประตูน้ำ, pronounced [prātūːnáːm], also spelled as Pratu Nam), is an intersection and namesake neighbourhood in Thanon Phaya Thai sub-district of Ratchathewi district, Bangkok. The intersection is where Phetchaburi Road passes and where Ratchadamri and Ratchaprarop Roads originate. The next major intersection along Ratchaprarop Road is Makkasan.

The name "Pratunam" means "water gate". Historically, there was a water gate located within the nearby Sa Pathum Palace, commonly referred to as "Pratunam Wang Sa Pathum" (ประตูน้ำวังสระปทุม) or "Pratunam Sa Pathum" (ประตูน้ำสระปทุม). This gate was built in 1905 by King Chulalongkorn (Rama V) to help drain water from the Khlong Saen Saep canal, serving both agricultural needs and maintaining water levels for boats and rafts. Two other similar water gates were also constructed in Chachoengsao Province during the same period.

In 1961, Pratunam was still a traditional market selling produce and other perishable goods. Over time, ready-made garment production began to develop, and more entrepreneurs gradually entered the trade. It eventually grew into a major clothing industry supplying retail goods to foreign customers as well as for export. As a result, Pratunam transformed into a hub for fashion retail and wholesale, which it remains today. Later on, a group of foreign investors, together with Thai businessmen such as M.R. Kukrit Pramoj and Lenglert Baiyoke, developed hotel and shopping center on the Ratchaprarop side under the names Indra Hotel and Indra The Arcade.

Today, Pratunam is regarded as one of the largest centers for both wholesale and retail clothing in Bangkok and in Thailand as a whole. The area is home to numerous malls and markets, including Platinum Fashion Mall, Pratunam Market, CentralWorld, and Big C Supercenter (Rajdamri Branch). In addition to its commercial role, Pratunam is also a key transportation hub. It is located near two other major intersections, Ratchaprasong and Pathum Wan, and serves as a stop on the Khlong Saen Saep boat service via Pratunam Pier.

The Pratunam overpass, which was Bangkok's first overpass, is scheduled to be demolished in March 2026 to make way for the construction of MRT Orange Line. It is expected to be rebuilt later the same year.
