= Phetchaburi Road =

Road in Bangkok, Thailand

Coordinates: 13°45′1.57″N 100°33′37.34″E

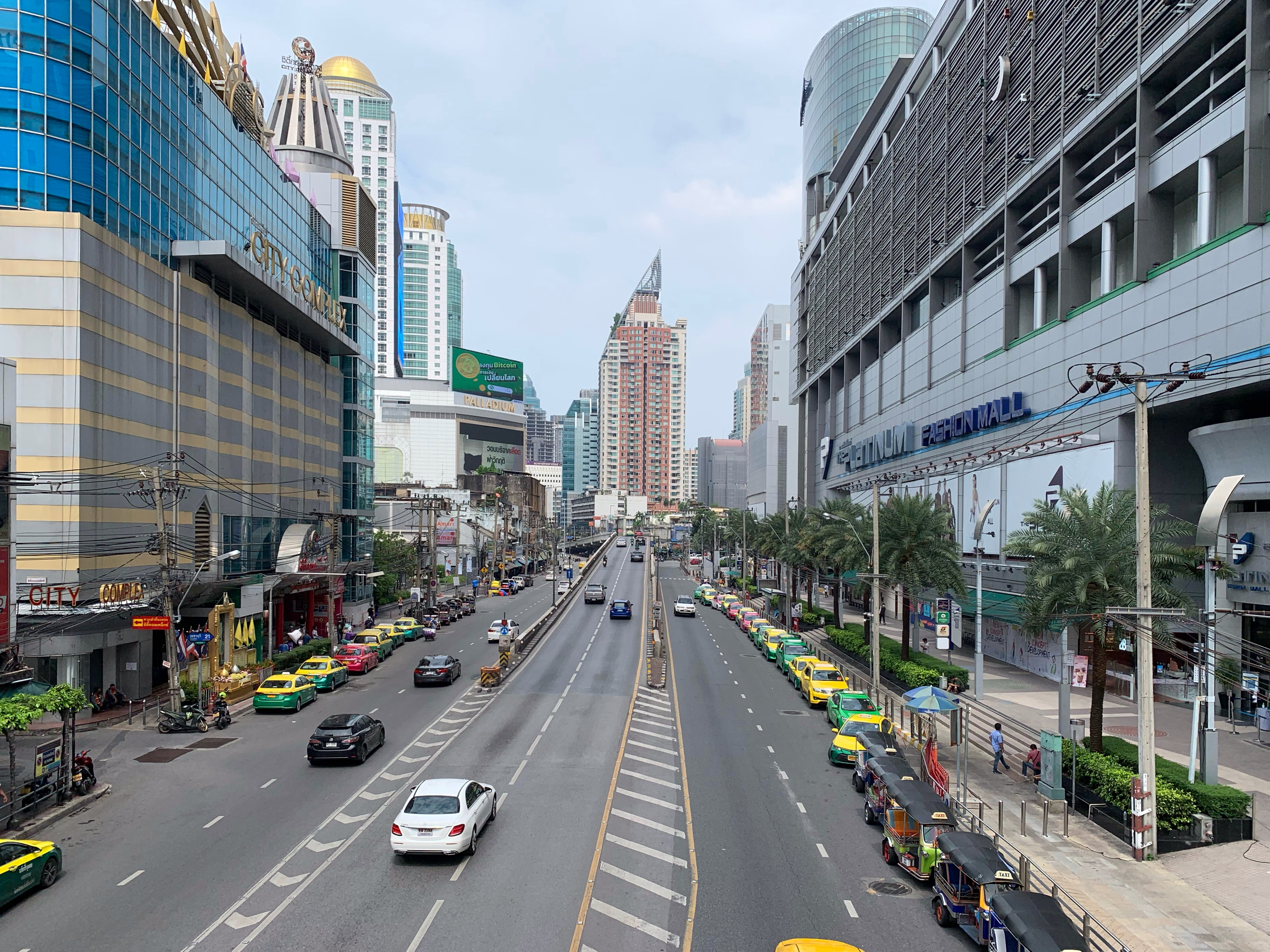
Phetchaburi Road near Pratunam Intersection in front of Platinum Fashion Mall

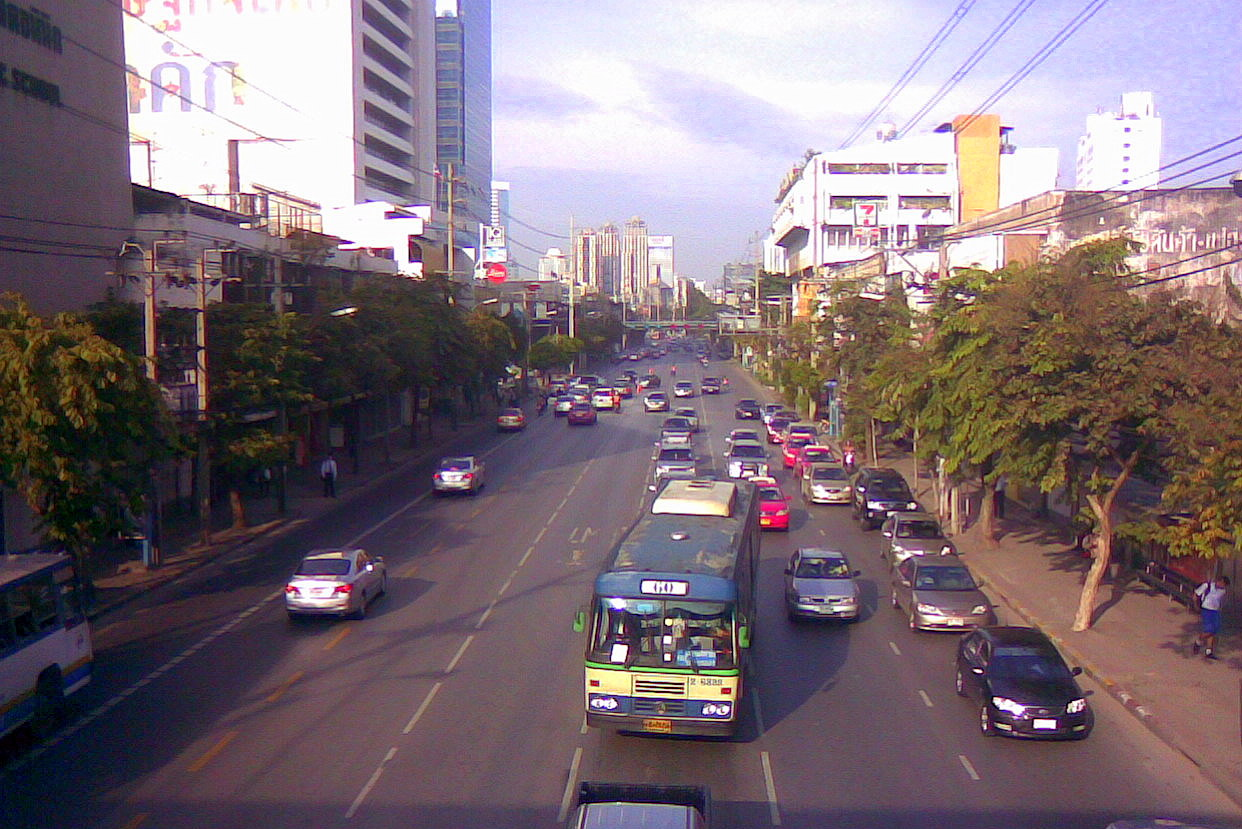
Phetchaburi Road (section New Phetchaburi Road) in front of Saint Dominic School

Phetchaburi Road (Thai: ถนนเพชรบุรี, pronounced [tʰā.nǒn pʰét.t͡ɕʰā.bū.rīː]) is a main road of Bangkok. It starts at Yommarat Intersection near Yommarat Railway Halt and Uruphong Intersection and ends at Khlong Tan Intersection, passing through four districts, Dusit, Ratchathewi, Huai Khwang, and Suan Luang. Its length is about 9 km (5.6 mi).

The road runs near places such as Pratunam Intersection, Pantip Plaza, Platinum Fashion Mall, Embassy of The Republic of Indonesia, Tourism Authority of Thailand (TAT), and Saint Dominic School.

It was built in July 1905 during the reign of King Chulalongkorn (Rama V) starting at the end of Ko Suea Road (ถนนคอเสื้อ, lit. 'collar road'; now Phitsanulok Road) and terminating at Pratunam. It was originally called "Pra Chae Chin Road" (ถนนประแจจีน, lit. 'Chinese decorative design road') after a type of Chinese porcelain, one of the most popular collections in that era. Later on 16 February 1919, King Vajiravudh (Rama VI) bestowed the new name of the Phetchaburi Road. The name honors one of the members of the Thai royal family, Valaya Alongkorn, Princess of Phetchaburi.

In 1962, the road was extended from Pratunam to the end of the Khlong Tan, officially opening the following year. This section of the road is often unofficially called "New Phetchaburi Road" (ถนนเพชรบุรีตัดใหม่). New Phetchaburi Road became infamous in the 1960s and early-1970s for its "American strip" of bars, massage parlours, brothels, and clubs frequented by US GIs on leave from Vietnam.

On the night of 24 September 1990, a serious accident occurred in New Phetchaburi Road near the intersection with Witthayu Road. A gas tank truck overturned, resulting in an explosion of LPG which caused a great fire. There were hundreds of casualties and deaths.
