= Pantip Plaza =

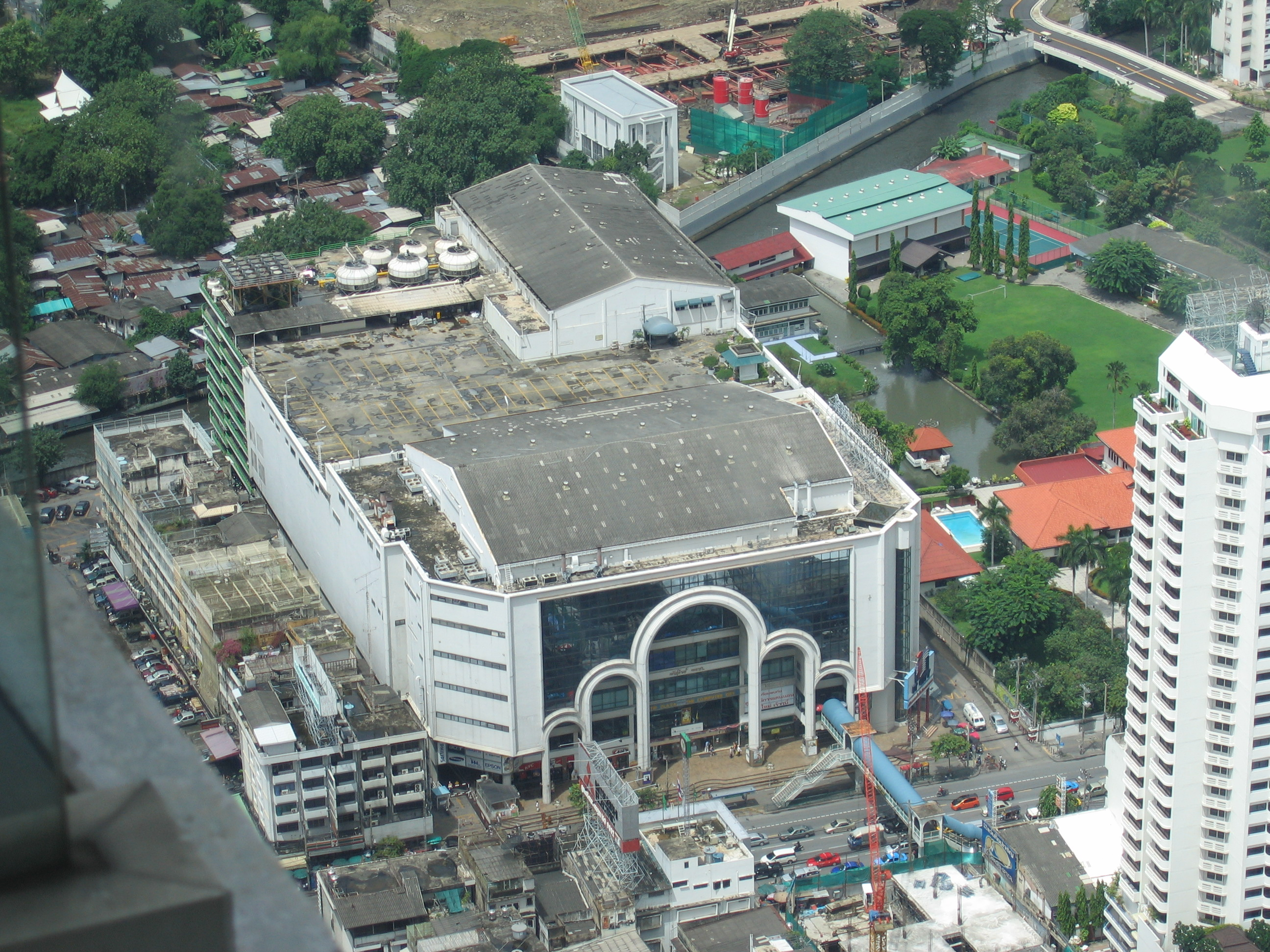
- Pantip Plaza taken from Baiyoke Tower 2
- Location: Ratchathewi, Bangkok, Thailand
- Coordinates: 13°45′0″N 100°32′15″E
- Address: New Phetchaburi Road
- Num. of anchor tenants: 2
- Floors: 5, including the mezzanine
- Website: www.pantipplaza.com

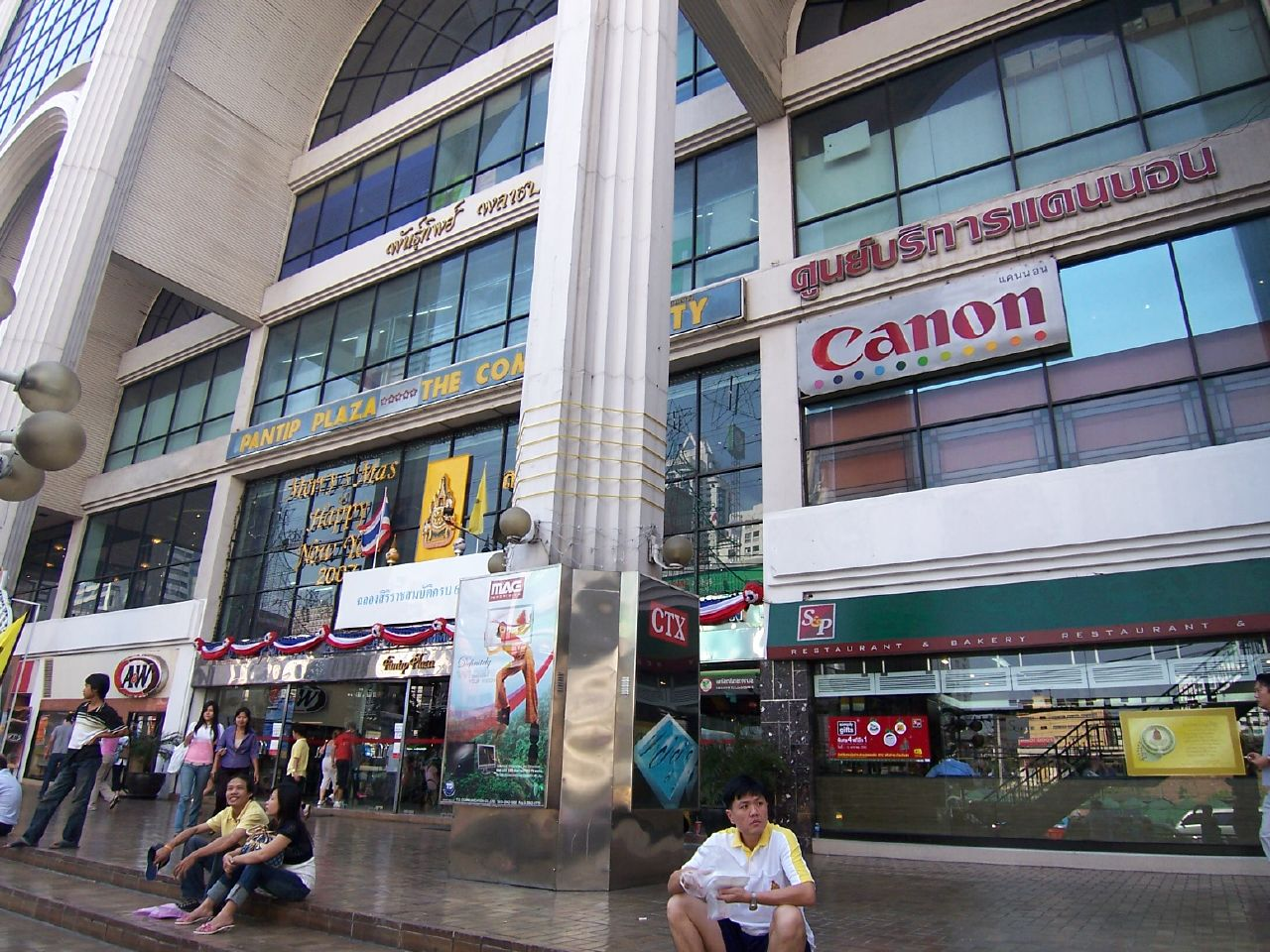
Entrance

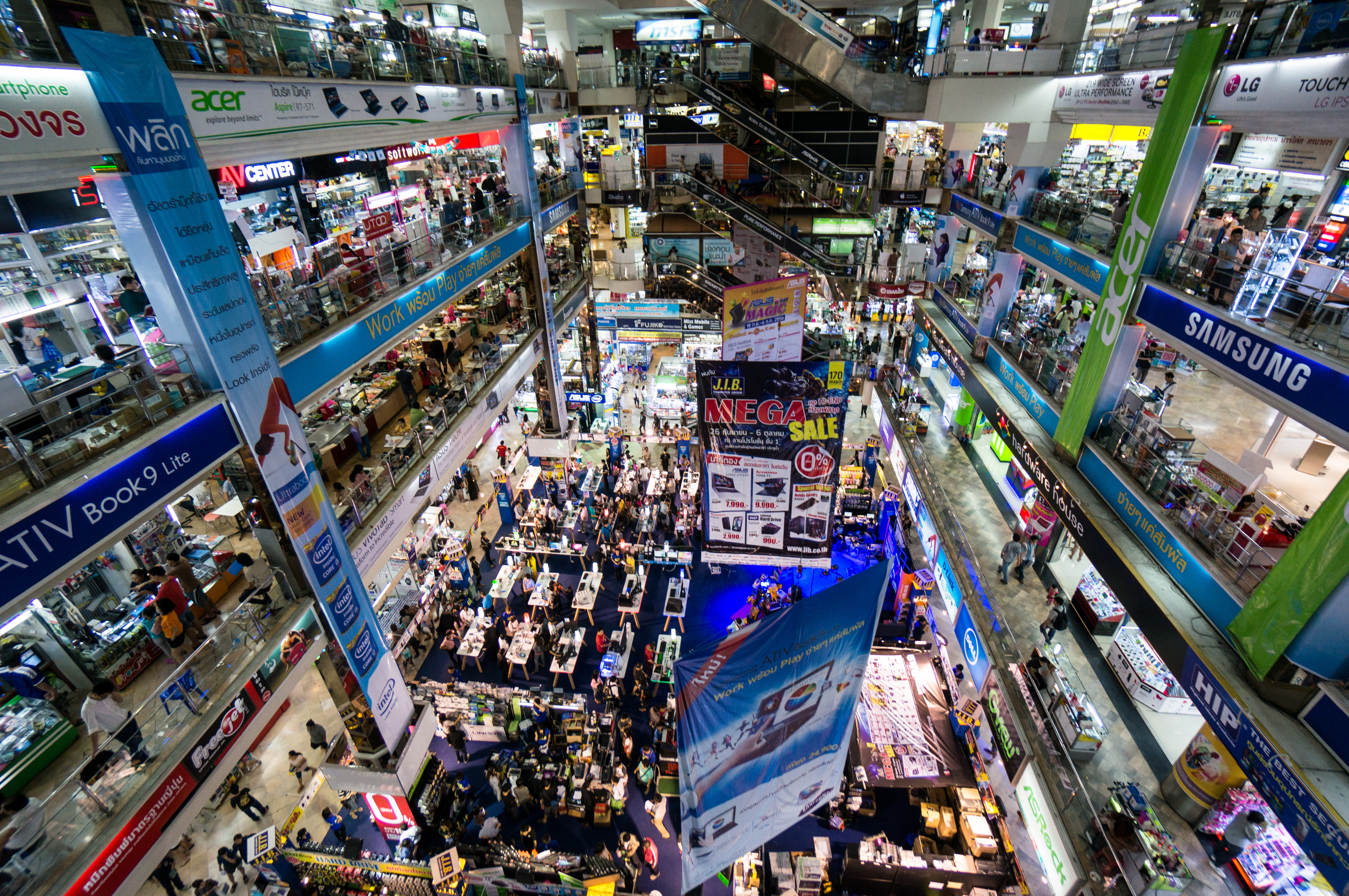
Interior

Pantip Plaza was an indoor IT shopping mall located on New Phetchaburi Road in Ratchathewi district, Bangkok, Thailand. It continues to have branch locations in Nonthaburi, in Bangkapi, and in Chiang Mai.

== Stores ==
The mall had two anchors, IT City, which occupies the top floor, and Data IT on the mezzanine level. There were hundreds of small shops specialising in computer hardware, software, and accessories, including repair, modifications, networking, secondhand, laptops, Macintosh and peripherals.

== Hardware ==
Shops in Pantip Plaza offered a wide selection of new and second-hand computers from most of the major manufacturers, together with a selection of secondhand and custom equipment. Digital cameras, printers, music players, and games consoles are also available.

== Food and drink ==
Pantip Plaza had some restaurants on the ground floor, while food courts on the mezzanine level and second floor offer a wide selection of Thai cuisine, desserts and drinks.

== Effect of 2018 Renovations ==
The mall was extensively renovated for 18 months starting in 2018. During this time, many shops were closed down because of the lowered foot traffic, and did not return. The mall has not recovered to its pre-2018 levels, with entire empty floors.

== 2020 rebranding to AEC Trade Center ==
Following the acquisition of management rights by Asset World Corporation Public Company Limited (AWC), Pantip Plaza Pratunam was redeveloped from an information technology shopping mall into the AEC Trade Center – Pantip Wholesale Destination. The complex was repositioned as a wholesale trade center and officially reopened in November 2020.

== 2024 redevelopment ==
Due to the COVID-19 pandemic, the AEC Trade Center – Pantip Wholesale Destination project shifted its focus toward food and lifestyle wholesale businesses. Asset World Corporation subsequently rebranded and redeveloped the complex as Phenix, a food-focused retail and wholesale hub, which officially opened on 26 June 2024. The site is also planned to be served by a future station on Bangkok's Orange Line, providing a mass transit connection in the area.

== Other branches ==
=== The Pantip at Ngamwong ===
The Pantip at Ngamwong is on Ngamwongwan Road in province of Nonthaburi.

=== Pantip Bangkapi ===
Pantip Bangkapi is on Lat Phrao Road, Bang Kapi district of Bangkok. Opened in May 2010 with 5 floors, it contains many brand name flagship stores such as Hewlett-Packard, Acer and VAIO. Although it has fewer stores than the original Pantip Plaza, it is one of the largest IT malls in the area.

=== The Pantip Lifestyle Hub, Chiang Mai ===
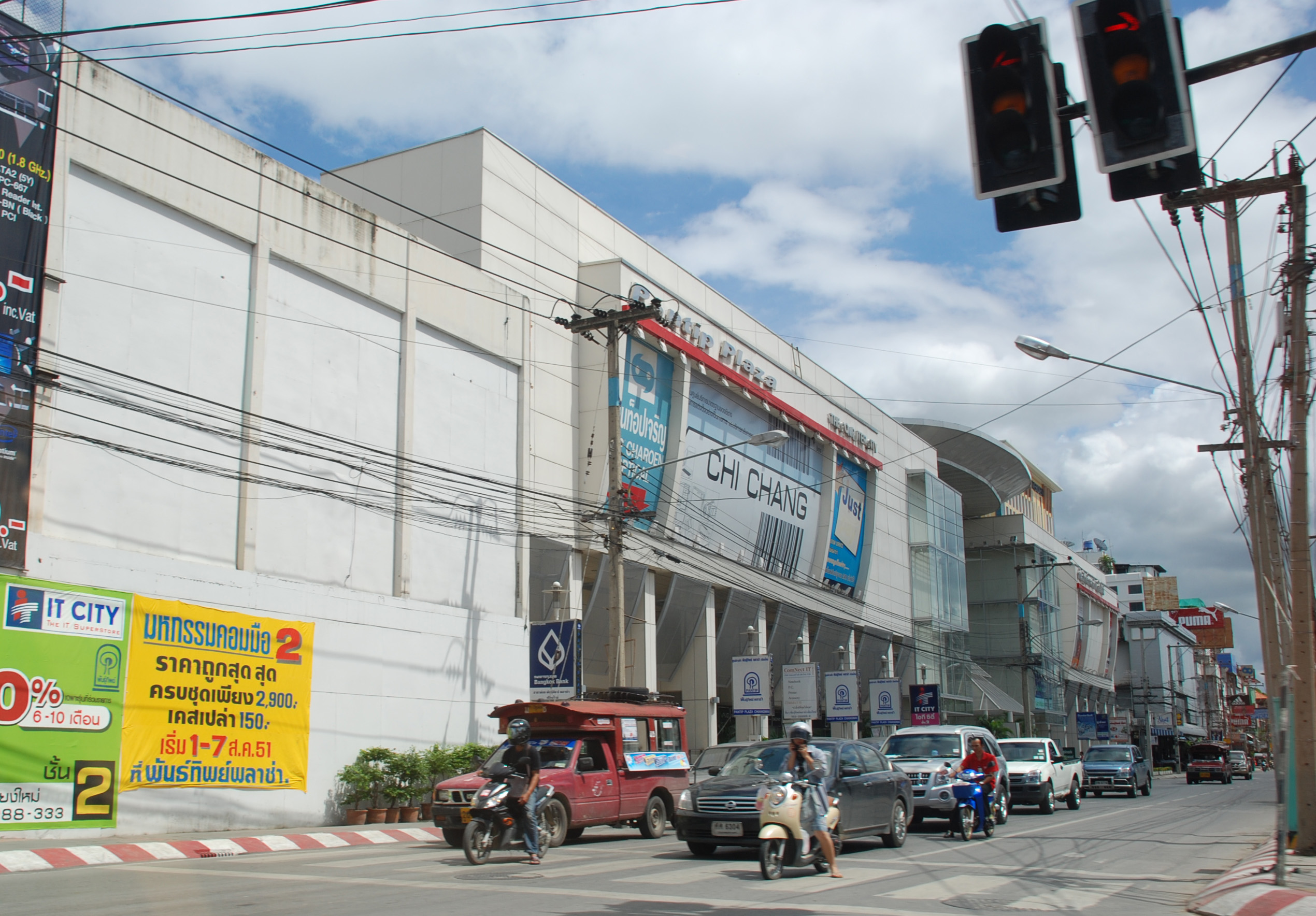
Pantip Plaza Chiang Mai

In Chiang Mai, The Pantip Lifestyle Hub is on the corner of Chang Klan Road (Night Bazaar) and Sri Donchai Road. It also has a food court.

== In popular culture ==
Pantip Plaza is featured in a hit song by Loso, "Pantip", which has a hook chorus, "Ja mai pai Pantip" ("จะไม่ไปพันธุ์ทิพย์" - "(I) will not go to Pantip") and is about a man dating a woman and taking her shopping at Centralworld, MBK Center, and Siam Square, but he refuses to take her to Pantip Plaza because his ex-girlfriend works there. It is used in many governments' advertising campaigns to promote anti-infringement issues in Thailand.
