= Sam Liam Din Daeng =

Coordinates: 13°45′46.05″N 100°32′33.92″E

Sam Liam Din Daeng (Thai: สามเหลี่ยมดินแดง, pronounced [sǎːm lîam din dɛ̄ːŋ]) is a road junction located in the Thanon Phaya Thai Subdistrict and Makkasan Subdistrict of Ratchathewi District, in central Bangkok. It is a three-way intersection where Ratchawithi Road, Ratchaprarop Road, and Din Daeng Road meet. The name of the junction, Sam Liam, means "triangle" in Thai, referring to its triangular shape. The junction is also notable for its overpass, which connects Ratchawithi Road to the Victory Monument area nearby.

This junction is often confused with the similarly named Tai Duan Din Daeng Junction (แยกใต้ด่วนดินแดง, [jɛ̂ːk tâːj dùan din dɛ̄ːŋ]), located further along Din Daeng Road in Din Daeng District, where it intersects with Vibhavadi Rangsit Road. That junction features both an overpass and an underpass.

Sam Liam Din Daeng has long been recognized as one of the locations with the highest number of traffic violations in Bangkok. In May 2018, CCTV cameras were installed at this and 14 other major intersections known for frequent violations. On just the second day after installation, the cameras recorded 3,524 traffic offenses at this junction alone.

== Incidents ==
The Sam Liam Din Daeng area, including Tai Duan Din Daeng Junction, was among several key protest sites during the political unrest of April 2009, known as the "Bloody Songkran". At the time, the government of Prime Minister Abhisit Vejjajiva launched crackdowns on demonstrators from the United Front of Democracy Against Dictatorship (UDD), also known as the Red Shirts. In this area, protesters were tear-gassed after seizing control of a gas truck. Sam Liam Din Daeng again became a site of political confrontation in 2010, when further UDD protests took place. Several demonstrators were injured or killed during the military crackdown that followed.

Since August 2021, Sam Liam Din Daeng has been used as a venue for daily evening protests against the government of Prime Minister Prayut Chan-ocha. These demonstrations frequently involved clashes between riot police and protesters, many of whom were young people, with some being affiliated with the Red Shirt movement.

== Neighbouring places ==
- Victory Monument
- Santiphap Park
