= Ratchaprarop Road =

Street in Bangkok, Thailand

Coordinates: 13°45′12.59″N 100°32′30.48″E

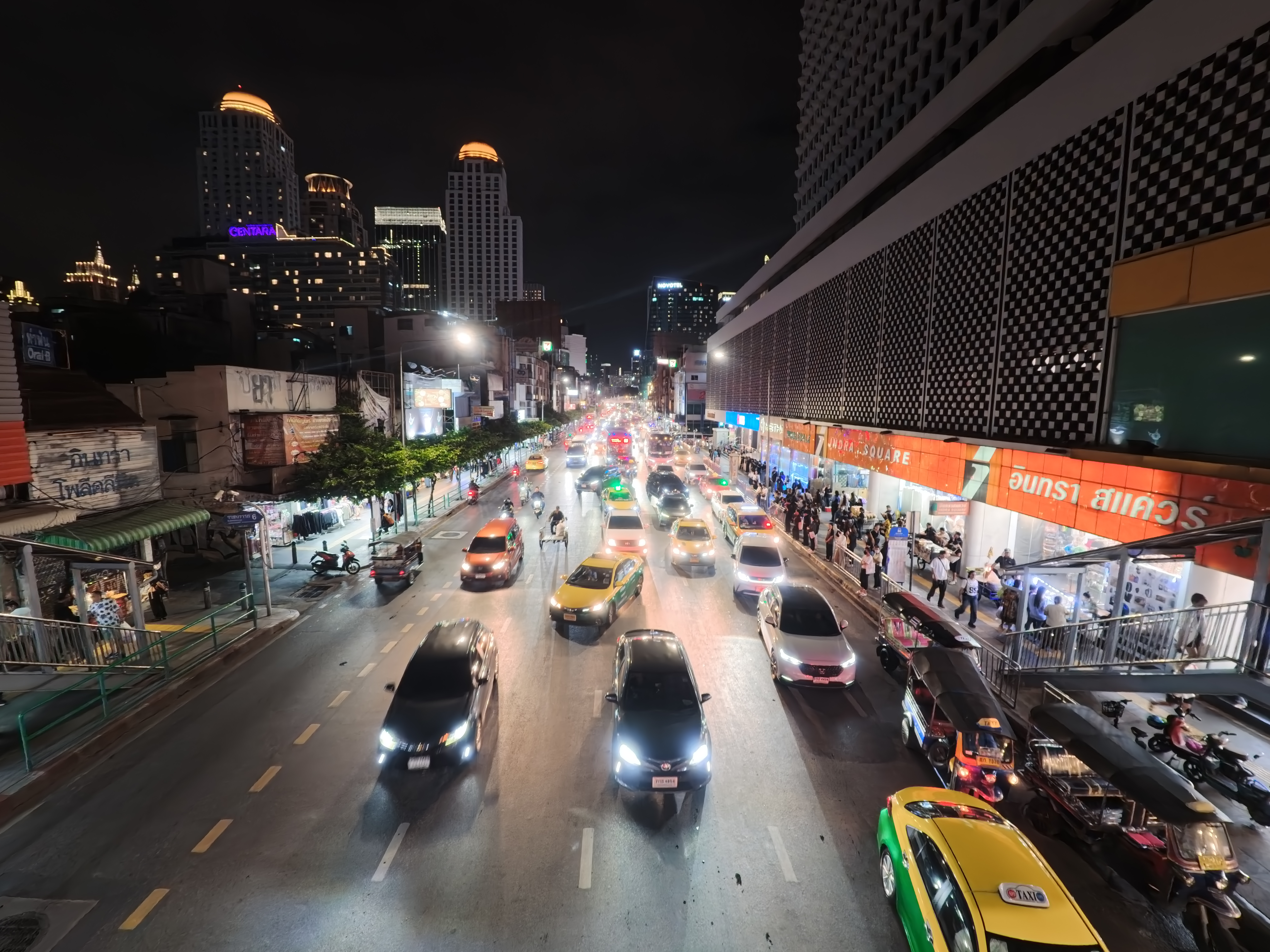
Ratchaprarop Road southbound

Ratchaprarop Road (Thai: ถนนราชปรารภ) is a major road in the Ratchathewi District of Bangkok, Thailand. It begins at Pratunam Intersection, as a continuation of Ratchadamri Road, where it meets Phetchaburi Road, and runs northward until it terminates at Sam Liam Din Daeng near Victory Monument, where it cuts with Ratchawithi Road and Din Daeng Road. The total length is approximately 1.4 km (0.9 mi). The road serves as links Bangkok's central commercial areas and transportation hubs, passing through the Pratunam district, known for its shopping and wholesale garment trade.

Prominent landmarks along Ratchaprarop Road include Baiyoke Tower II, one of the tallest buildings in Bangkok and Southeast Asia, as well as Pratunam Market and numerous hotels and retail centers. The road is also served by the Ratchaprarop Airport Rail Link Station, provides access to Suvarnabhumi Airport and other parts of the city. In addition, the MRT Orange Line is currently under construction and will include a Ratchaprarop station, further enhancing connectivity and easing traffic congestion in the area once completed.

== Route ==
Ratchaprarop Road begins at the Pratunam Intersection, where it connects with Phetchaburi Road, and extends northward to meet Ratchawithi Road and Din Daeng Road near the Victory Monument. Along its route, the road passes through the Pratunam commercial area, which is one of Bangkok’s busiest shopping districts. The road also provides access to several alleys (Sois) that lead to hotels, office buildings, and local markets.

== History ==
Ratchaprarop Road was developed during the mid-20th century as part of Bangkok’s efforts to improve transportation links between the central commercial zones and the northern districts of the city. The name “Ratchaprarop” (Thai: ราชปรารภ) roughly translates to “Royal Proclamation,” reflecting the tradition of naming major city roads with terms related to royal or governmental functions. Over time, the road became a central access point to the growing Pratunam area, which evolved into a major hub for clothing trade and tourism.

Pata, one of the major department stores of the 1970s and 1980s, opened its first branch here in 1973. At the time, teenagers preferred shopping in the Ratchaprarop area, particularly around Indra The Arcade (now Indra Square, part of Pratunam Market), rather than Siam Square or Siam Center, as it was a hub for fashionable clothing, cassette tapes, and vinyl records from the United States. Today, only one Pata branch remains, located in Pinklao on the Thonburi side of Bangkok, where a zoo is still situated on its rooftop.

== Landmarks ==
Several important landmarks and attractions are located along or near Ratchaprarop Road:

- Baiyoke Tower II – One of the tallest buildings in Thailand and Southeast Asia, housing a hotel and observation deck.
- Pratunam Market – A large wholesale clothing market known for affordable fashion and textiles.
- Ratchaprarop Airport Rail Link Station – A key transport hub connecting downtown Bangkok with Suvarnabhumi Airport.
- Indra Regent Hotel – One of the oldest hotels in the Pratunam area.

Numerous retail stores, street markets, and small hotels catering to both local residents and tourists.

== Transportation ==
Ratchaprarop Road is served by various modes of public transportation. The Ratchaprarop Station on the Airport Rail Link (ARL) provides access to Suvarnabhumi Airport and other key parts of Bangkok. Several city bus routes and taxi services operate along the road, making it one of the area’s busiest transit corridors. The MRT Orange Line, a major rapid transit project managed by the Mass Rapid Transit Authority of Thailand (MRTA), is currently under construction. The project includes a new Ratchaprarop Station, which will serve as an interchange between the Orange Line and the Airport Rail Link. Once completed, the station is expected to ease congestion and improve connectivity between the eastern and western parts of Bangkok.

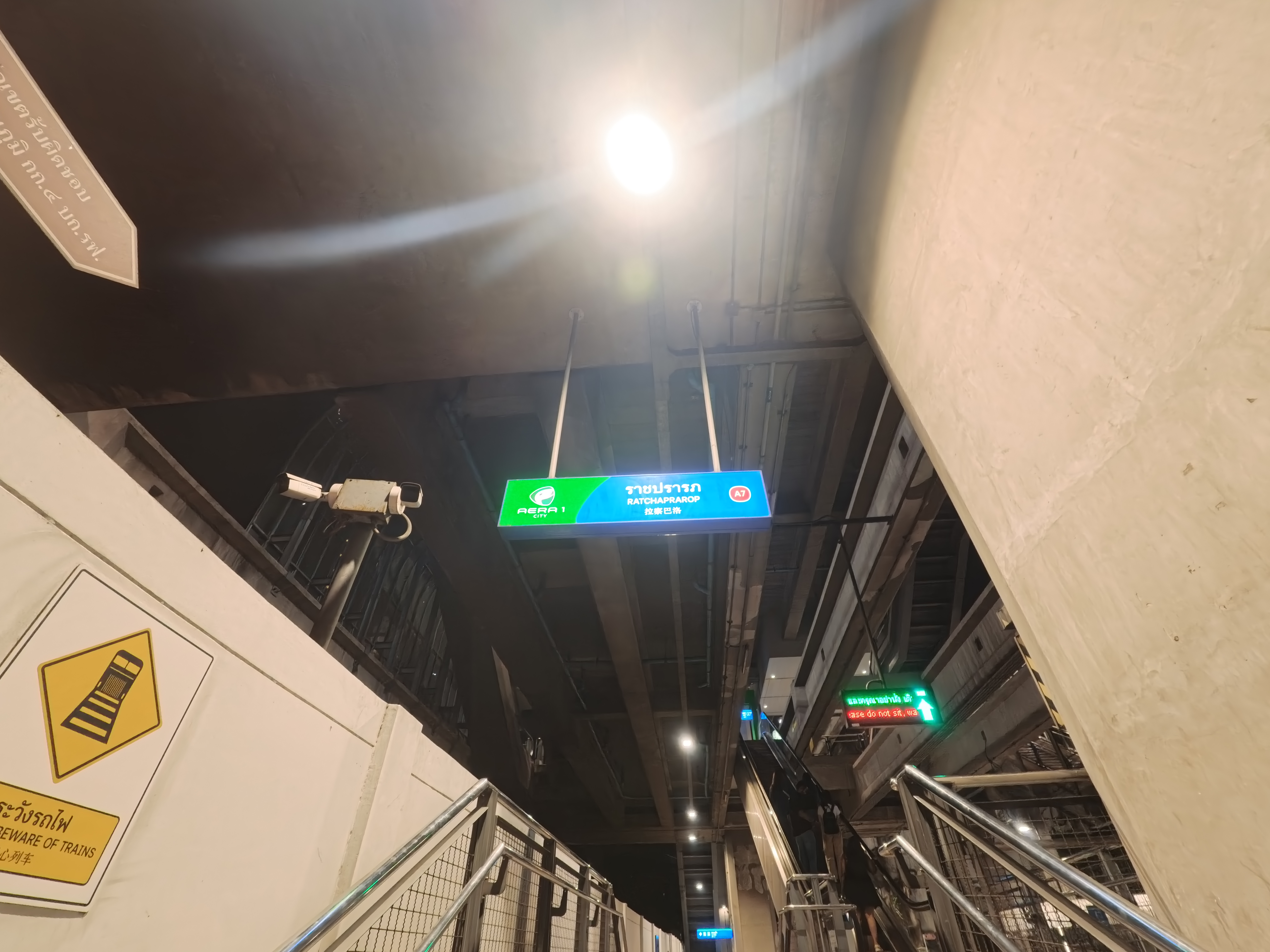
Ratchaprarop Station Airport Rail Link Entrance

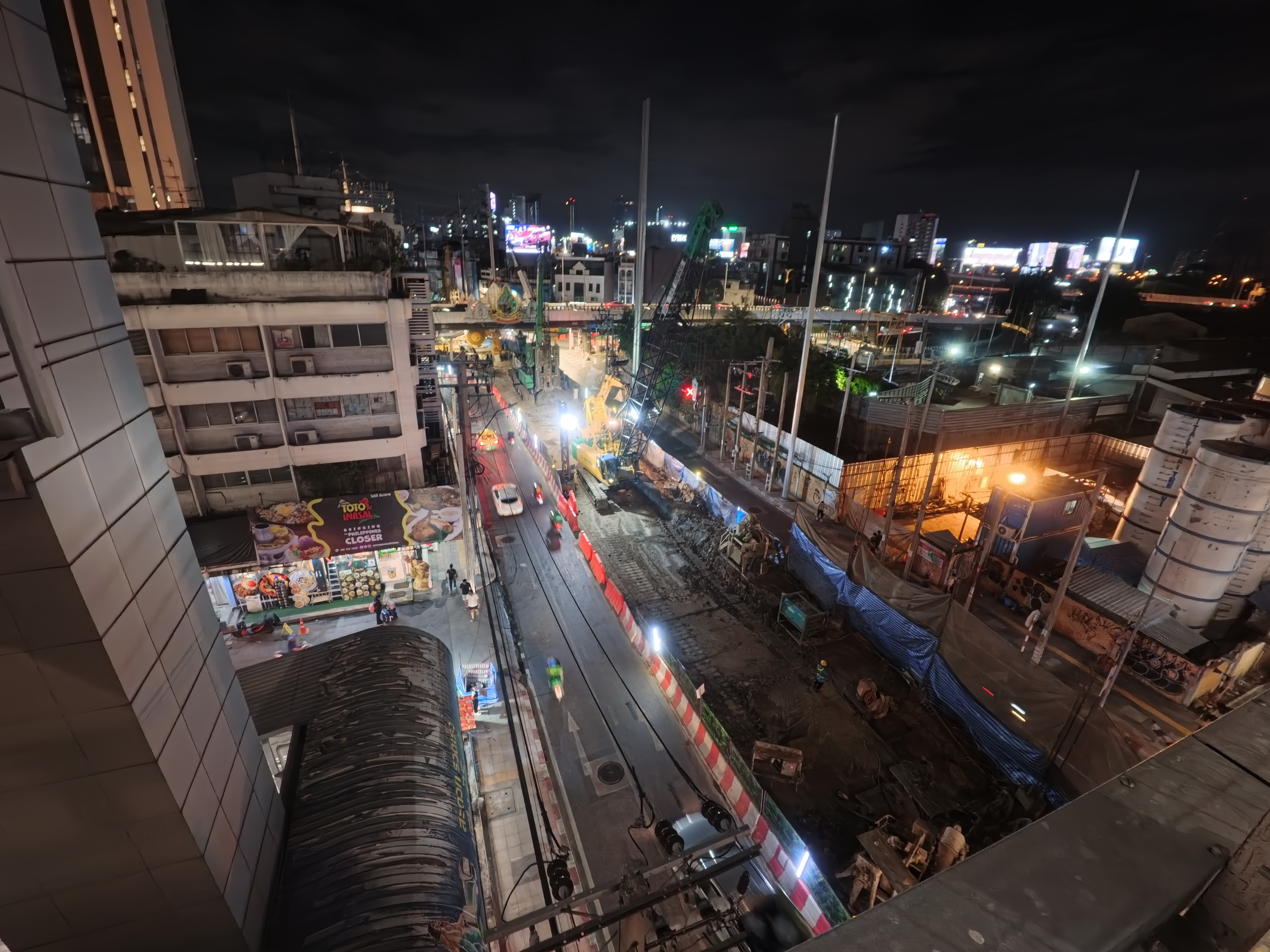
Ratchaprarop Station MRT Orange line construction
