= Abortion in Thailand =

Overview of the legality and prevalence of abortions in Thailand

Abortion in Thailand is legal and available on-request up to 20 weeks of pregnancy. Abortion has been legal up to at least 12 weeks of pregnancy since 7 February 2021. Following a 2020 ruling of the Constitutional Court which declared a portion of the abortion statutes unconstitutional, the Parliament removed first-term abortion from the criminal code. Once strict, over time laws have been relaxed to take into account high rates of teen pregnancy, women who lack the means or will to raise children, and the consequences of illegal abortion.

== Legal status ==
The legal status of abortion in Thailand is governed by the Thai Criminal Code. Until February 2021 abortion was illegal except under limited circumstances. By the letter, the law allowed termination of a pregnancy by physicians only (1) when abortion was necessary due to the health of the pregnant woman, or (2) if the pregnancy was the result of rape. Abortions performed outside of these circumstances were punishable by up to three years in jail (as well as fines) for the woman and up to five years for the performer (up to seven years if it was performed against the will of the woman).

In 1989, during the rise of the AIDS epidemic, the Medical Council issued a consultation to the Council of State on whether the law could be interpreted to allow abortion in HIV-positive cases in which the child, if born, could not be expected to enjoy an acceptable quality of life. The Council of State replied that this was impermissible, since the law allowed only consideration for the health of the mother, and not the child. Later, the interpretation of health was debated, and the Medical Council issued a regulation in 2005 in which it explicitly interpreted both physical and mental health as possible factors necessitating abortion. This has been widely interpreted to include women who are emotionally distressed at the prospect of having children they cannot raise. The regulation restricts clinics like those operated by the Planned Parenthood Association of Thailand to provide abortions to women only in their first trimester of pregnancy. Those seeking to end second-trimester pregnancies must do so at a hospital. Abortions are prohibited after 28 weeks.

The Ministry of Public Health (MoPH) regulates medical abortions. Termination of a foetus that is fewer than nine weeks from gestation is permitted if some or all of the following criteria are met: (1) medical necessity, (2) legal necessity (e.g., rape), (3) female is under 15 years of age (and unmarried), (4) the foetus is at risk of severe abnormalities or genetic disorders.

In December 2014, two drugs that induce miscarriage—mifepristone and misoprostol—were approved for ending pregnancies in a hospital setting. The drugs must be prescribed by doctors at approved hospitals or clinics. Women who self-medicate to terminate pregnancies on their own are liable for punishment under the law.

In a decision published on 19 February 2020, the Constitutional Court of Thailand ruled that Thailand's abortion law was unconstitutional. Under Section 301 of the Criminal Code which deals with abortion, women who seek an abortion faced up to three years imprisonment and a fine of up to 60,000 baht, or both. The Constitutional Court ruled that Section 301 violated Sections 27 and 28 of the 2017 Constitution of Thailand (also known as the "charter") which mandates equal rights for men and women, as well as the right and liberty to everyone to his or her life and person. The court ordered that Section 301 be nullified within 360 days of its ruling, i.e., no later than 13 February 2021. Section 305 of the anti-abortion law, allowing for legal abortion when the pregnancy involves rape or endangers a mother's physical health, was judged to be not in violation of the charter. The Constitutional Court ordered the amendment of both Sections 301 and 305 to accord with Thailand's current realities.

Following the Court's ruling, on 17 November 2020 the Government submitted a bill amending the two sections of the penal code: under the new Section 305 abortion on request would become legal in the first 12 weeks of pregnancy, while pregnancy termination would always be made available not only in case of rape or when the woman's health is in danger but also in case of serious fetal impairment; under the new Section 301 penalties for later-term abortion would be reduced to no longer than six months of jail and/or a fine no higher than 10,000 baht. The House of Representatives approved the bill in first reading on 23 December 2020 and finally passed it in third reading on 20 January 2021, with 276 votes in support, 8 abstentions and 54 votes against. The Senate passed it on 25 January 2021 with 166 to 7 votes in favor, completing the Parliament's approval. The bill received the royal assent on 5 February 2021 and was announced in the Royal Thai Government Gazette on 6 February 2021, which set its commencement date on the following day.

== Abortion statistics ==
Teen pregnancies in Thailand account for as much as 15% of total pregnancies, well above the World Health Organization's 10% median. Data from the Thai Department of Health showed that 72,566 teens aged 10–19 years old gave birth in 2018, or 199 such babies being born per day. Of the total, 9% gave birth to their second child. In the 10–14 age group, 2,385 young girls, down from 2,559 in 2017, gave birth, seven cases a day. According to the Thai National Health Security Office, over 300,000 women have sought medical treatment at state hospitals for incomplete abortions from 2009 to 2019. Nearly 100,000 of them suffered complications and infections. More than 20 of them died each year. The casualties mount even though safe, WHO-approved abortion pills, legal in more than 60 countries, have been available for over a decade.

Teens rarely visit abortion clinics, possibly because parental consent is required, or possibly because they cannot afford the cost, between 4,000 and 5,000 baht. Clinics, like state hospitals, charge women for abortion services, except for rape victims or economically disadvantaged women.

Health department data suggest that most women seek abortions for social and economic reasons. Quantifying the number of abortions performed is difficult as numbers are not made public. A 2012 report published by state hospitals does not differentiate between elective abortion, abortion for health reasons, or miscarriage. "...there has never been any official report on the ratio of induced abortions to the number of abortions overall in Thailand," the paper said. The director of Thailand's Bureau of Reproductive Health notes that there is no centralized database for abortion numbers in Thailand. Private clinics, citing confidentiality, do not provide data to his department. Illegal abortions are impossible to track. "No one in this country knows the overall number of abortions," he said. The lack of national data means that his bureau resorts to conducting a yearly survey called the "Abortion Surveillance Report". It compiles cases of abortion from a number of provinces to gauge the background and motivations of those who seek abortions.

== Public opinion ==
Acceptance of abortion by the Thai public has lagged behind the gradual easing of abortion laws. Buddhism is the faith of 98% of the Thai populace, and nearly all Buddhist clergy and experts view abortion as a transgression that will haunt the "sinner". In a UNICEF study, those interviewed observe that abortion is not accepted culturally. Although medical abortion is available if specific criteria are met, social taboos stigmatize those seeking an abortion. Adolescents say their family members disapprove of abortion and that public health services staff frequently oppose abortion and denigrate women who inquire about it.

Patients under age 18 must have parental approval to access health care services. Adolescents emphasize the barrier that the requirement for parental consent creates. Most teens do not want their parents to know they are using reproductive health services. Parental consent is an obstacle to both general services such as birth control counseling as well as legal abortion services. Some of those interviewed describe a lack of privacy in hospitals as a barrier to accessing services. Youth responses also show that adolescents lack trust in service providers. They fear providers will not keep information confidential and are particularly anxious that providers will share information with family and other community members. This fear is heightened in smaller, close-knit rural communities. Even in cases in which abortion is legal, interviewees reported that a large percentage of physicians are not willing to perform abortions or prescribe medication for medical abortion due to their beliefs or social pressures.

== See also ==
- Childbirth in Thailand
- Health in Thailand
