= Lerdsin Hospital =

Lerdsin Hospital โรงพยาบาลเลิดสิน
- Department of Medical Services. MOPH

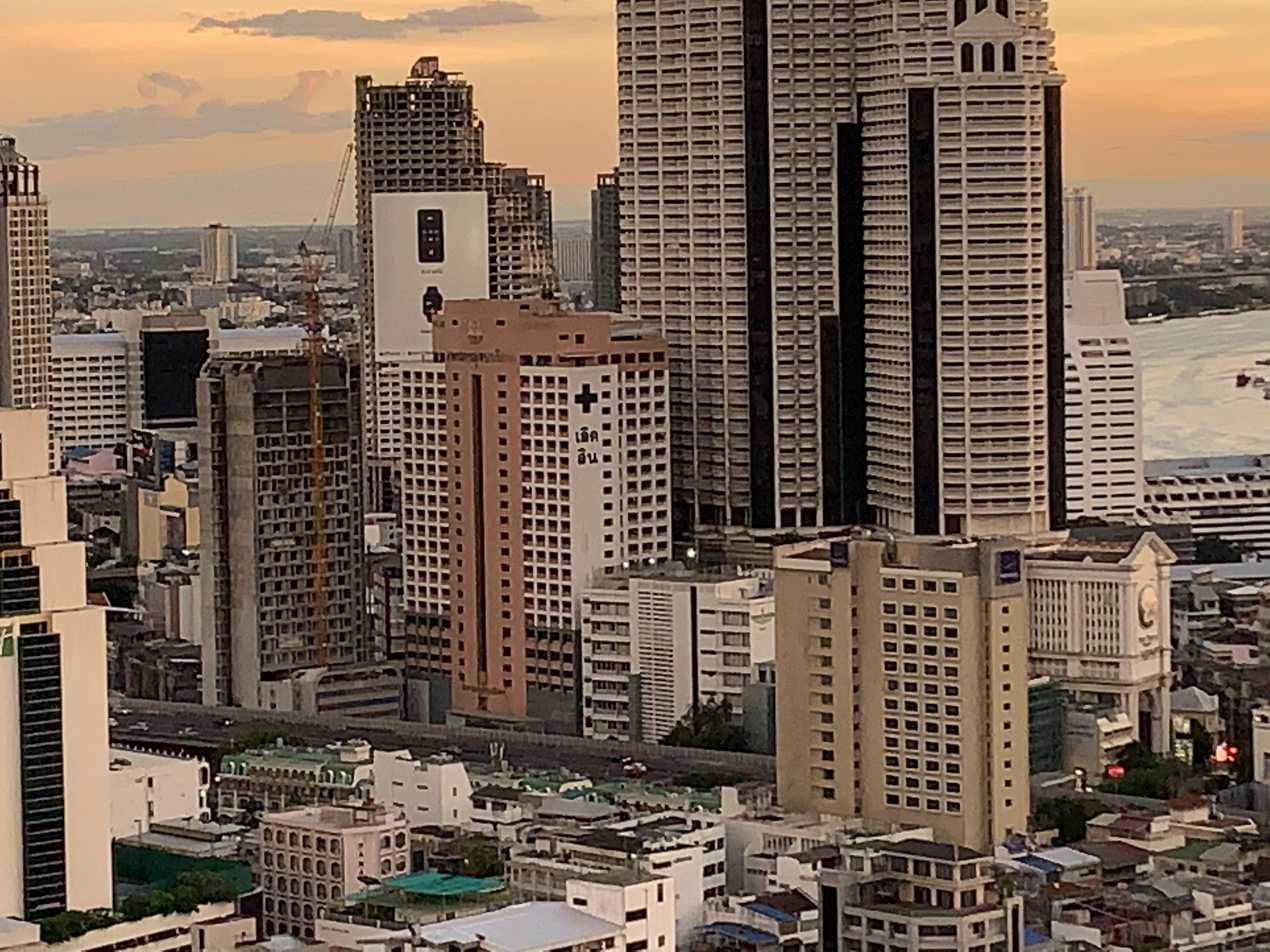
- Lerdsin Hospital (middle), surrounding by skyscrapers in Bang Rak District

Geography
- Location: 190 Silom Road, Sri Wiang Subdistrict, Bang Rak, Bangkok 10500, Thailand
- Coordinates: 13.722176°N 100.517401°E

Organisation
- Type: Teaching
- Affiliated university: College of Medicine, Rangsit University; Faculty of Medicine Siriraj Hospital, Mahidol University; Faculty of Medicine, Srinakharinwirot University

Services
- Beds: 500

History
- Founded: 1889

Links
- Website: www.lerdsin.go.th/en/1.html
- Lists: Hospitals in Thailand

Lerdsin Hospital (Thai: โรงพยาบาลเลิดสิน) is a hospital located in Bang Rak District, Bangkok, Thailand. It is a main teaching hospital for the College of Medicine, Rangsit University. It is an affiliated teaching hospital of the Faculty of Medicine Siriraj Hospital, Mahidol University and the Faculty of Medicine, Srinakharinwirot University.

== History ==
The earliest records of the hospital can be traced to the presence of Bang Rak Hospital at the junction of Silom and Charoen Krung Roads, run by American doctor Thomas Heyward Hays. Hays was instrumental in laying the foundations of Western medicine in Thailand and was also the first director of Siriraj Hospital and the first lecturer of Western medicine in Thailand at the Bhatayakorn School. Lerdsin was also the hospital where injured soldiers and civilians were treated following the Paknam incident. In 1929 plans were set up to build a Bang Rak Health Station for general treatment and paediatric treatment. Following a sexually-trainsmitted infection (STI) epidemic in 1936, an STI unit was established in 1939.

During the Second World War, Lerdsin Hospital was damaged following the Bombing of Bangkok and general treatment was temporarily halted, while only the STI unit remained open. Following the war after years of successful operation of the STI unit, it became upgraded to the Division of Sexually-transmitted Infection Control of the Department of Medical Services (DMS) and hospital operations were transferred to the DMS and renamed Lerdsin Hospital.

In 1973, the first residency training started at Lerdsin in the field of general surgery. In 2013, Lerdsin Hospital cooperated with the College of Medicine, Rangsit University to provide medical education. Students in this group study at Lerdsin Hospital only.

== See also ==
- Health in Thailand
- Hospitals in Thailand
- List of hospitals in Thailand
