= Ratchawithi Road =

Street in Bangkok, Thailand

Coordinates: 13°46′25″N 100°31′08″E

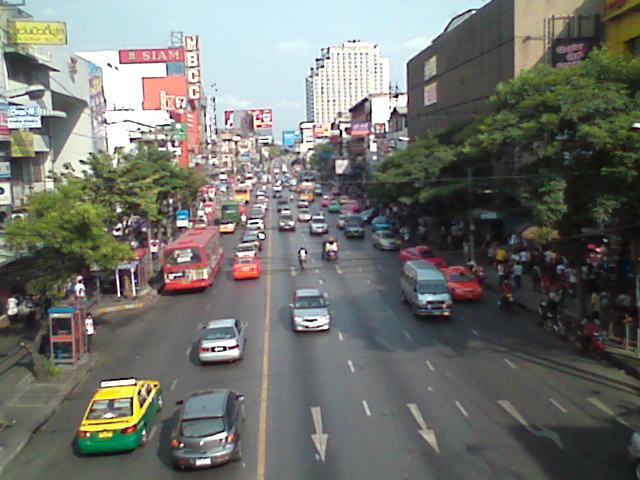
Ratchawithi Road

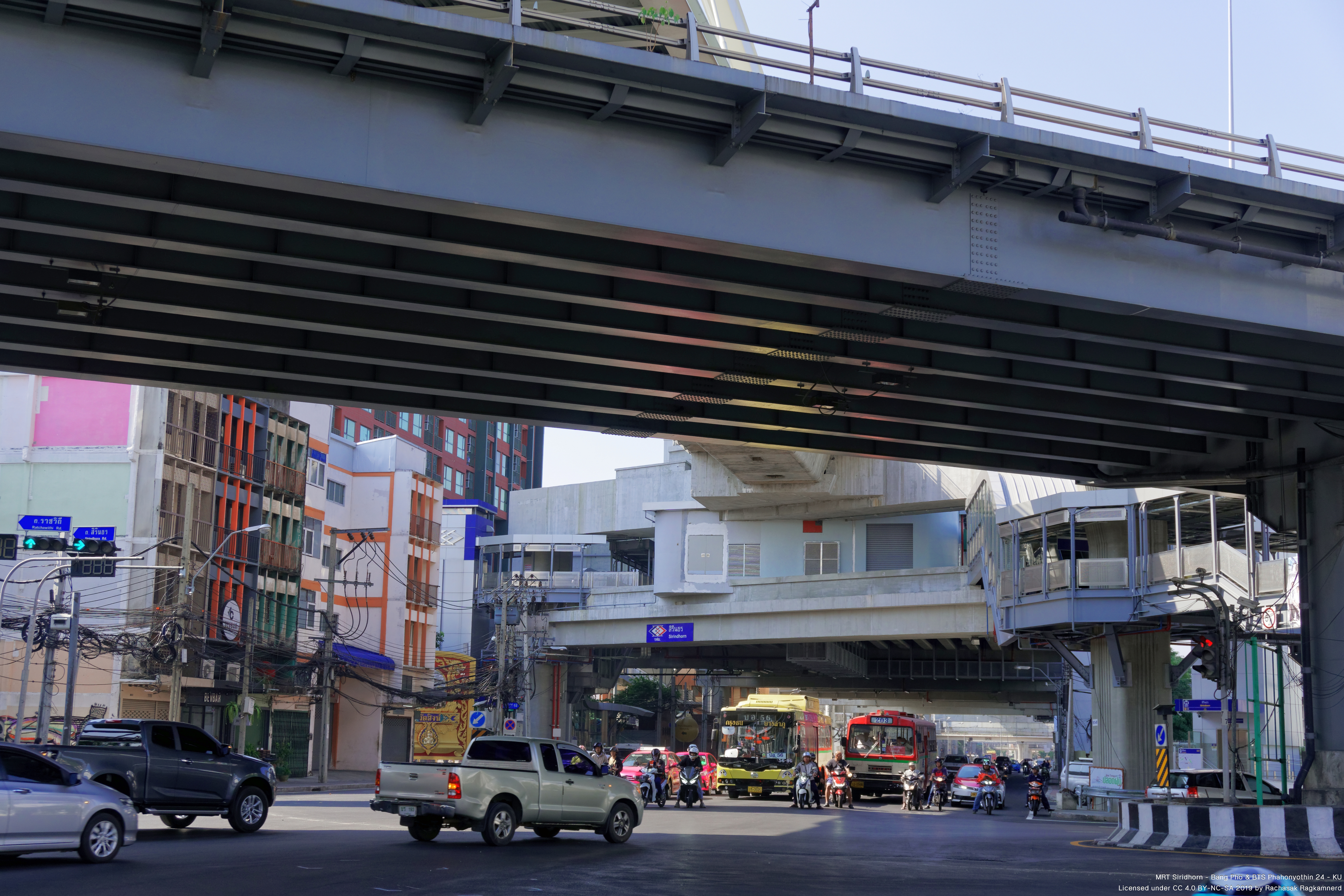
Bang Phlat Intersection, where this road terminates

Ratchawithi Road, also spelled Rajvithi (Thai: ถนนราชวิถี, RTGS: Thanon Ratchawithi) is a major road in Bangkok, Thailand. It begins in Ratchathewi district at Sam Liam Din Daeng Junction, where it intersects with Din Daeng Road and Ratchaprarop Road, and runs northwest, past Victory Monument Circle, through Dusit district, and ultimately crossing the Chao Phraya River on Krung Thon Bridge and ending in Bang Phlat district at Bang Phlat Intersection, where it intersects with Sirindhorn Road and Charan Sanitwong Road.

Ratchawithi Road was formerly known as Sang Hi Road (Thai: ถนนซางฮี้ or ถนนซังฮี้). It was originally constructed during the reign of King Chulalongkorn, as one of three new roads constructed at the time Dusit Palace was built, along with Lok Road (Thai: ถนนลก, now Rama V Road) and Duang Tawan Road (Thai: ถนนดวงตะวัน, now Si Ayutthaya Road). The name "Sang Hi" comes from Chinese (囍), and means "exceedingly happy".

The original road stretched only from behind Dusit Palace to the edge of the Chao Phraya. It was later expanded to connect to Ratchaprarop Road, and then extended across the river to Charan Sanitwong Road when the Krung Thon Bridge began construction in 1954. Because it connected the two sections of the former Sang Hi Road on either side of the river, the Krung Thong Bridge has been called by locals Sang Hi Bridge (Thai: สะพานซังฮี้, Saphan Sang Hi) since before it was officially christened. The intersection of Ratchawithi and Samsen roads, the final intersection before crossing the bridge on the east side of the river, is named Sang Hi Intersection.

The name was changed to Ratchawithi Road on February 16, 1918 by King Vajiravudh. The term is derived from the Pali/Sanskrit, rāja + vīthi, and means "royal way" or "king's road".

The stretch of the road from Victory Monument to Kamphaeng Phet 5 Road is lined with a large number of hospitals and health-related institutions. These include Rajavithi Hospital and Boromarajonani College of Nursing, the Institute of Dermatology, Queen Sirikit National Institute of Child Health (Children's Hospital), Hospital for Tropical Diseases, Phramongkutklao Hospital and College of Medicine, the Royal Thai Army Nursing College, Prasat Neurological Institute and the under-construction extension of Ramathibodi Hospital.

At Ratchawithi Intersection, where it meets Rama V Road near Chitralada Royal Villa and Dusit Zoo, at around 6:30 a.m. on Sunday, October 14, 1973, a clash occurred between a group of protesters demanding a constitution and the police. This escalated into a bloody uprising recorded in history as the "October 14 event".
