= College of Medicine, Rangsit University =

Medical school in Thailand

- วิทยาลัยแพทยศาสตร์ มหาวิทยาลัยรังสิต
- Former names: Faculty of Medicine, Rangsit College; Faculty of Medicine, Rangsit University
- Type: Private
- Established: 1 May 1989
- Parent institution: Rangsit University
- Dean: Clinical Prof. Jedsada Chokdamrongsuk, M.D.
- Location: 2 Joint Institute of the Department of Medical Services-Rangsit University Building, Rajavithi Hospital, Phaya Thai Road, Thung Phayathai Subdistrict, Ratchathewi District, Bangkok 10400, Thailand; 13.763033°N 100.536831°E
- Colors: Green
- Website: http://www.rsu.ac.th/medicine/Default.aspx http://www.dms.rsu.ac.th

The College of Medicine, Rangsit University (Thai: วิทยาลัยแพทยศาสตร์ มหาวิทยาลัยรังสิต) is the first private medical school and the ninth oldest medical school in Thailand.

== History ==
The Faculty of Medicine, Rangsit College was founded on 1 May 1989, following a successful proposal to the council of Thai Universities. On 1990, following the name change of Rangsit College to Rangsit University, the name changed to Faculty of Medicine, Rangsit University. On 15 March 1994, the university made an agreement with the Department of Medical Services, Ministry of Public Health to provide medical teaching facilities at Rajavithi Hospital and the Children's Hospital (now Queen Sirikit National Institute of Child Health). In February 1996, the university made an agreement with Harvard Medical School of Harvard University to improve medical education and set up a conference, of which all medical schools in Thailand attended.

On 1 May 2002, the faculty became the College of Medicine, Rangsit University, following the management model of Harvard University. In 2013, Lerdsin Hospital became affiliated to the college as a teaching hospital. Nopparat Rajathanee Hospital also became affiliated to the college in 2015 and accepted the first cohort of medical students in the 2021 academic year. Students applying to study medicine through the Consortium of Thai Medical Schools Examination (กสพท), can select to study at three different hospital groups: 1.Rajavithi and Queen Sirikit, 2.Lerdsin or 3.Nopparat Rajathanee.

== Departments ==
- Department of Anaesthesiology
- Department of Emergency Medicine
- Department of Family Medicine
- Department of Internal Medicine
- Department of Obstetrics and Gynaecology
- Department of Orthopaedics
- Department of Ophthalmology
- Department of Otolaryngology
- Department of Pathology and Forensic Medicine
- Department of Paediatrics
- Department of Psychiatry
- Department of Radiology
- Department of Rehabilitative Medicine
- Department of Surgery

== Teaching hospitals ==
- Rajavithi Hospital
- Queen Sirikit National Institute of Child Health
- Lerdsin Hospital
- Nopparat Rajathanee Hospital

== See also ==
- List of medical schools in Thailand
