= Victory Monument (Bangkok) =

Military monument in Bangkok, Thailand

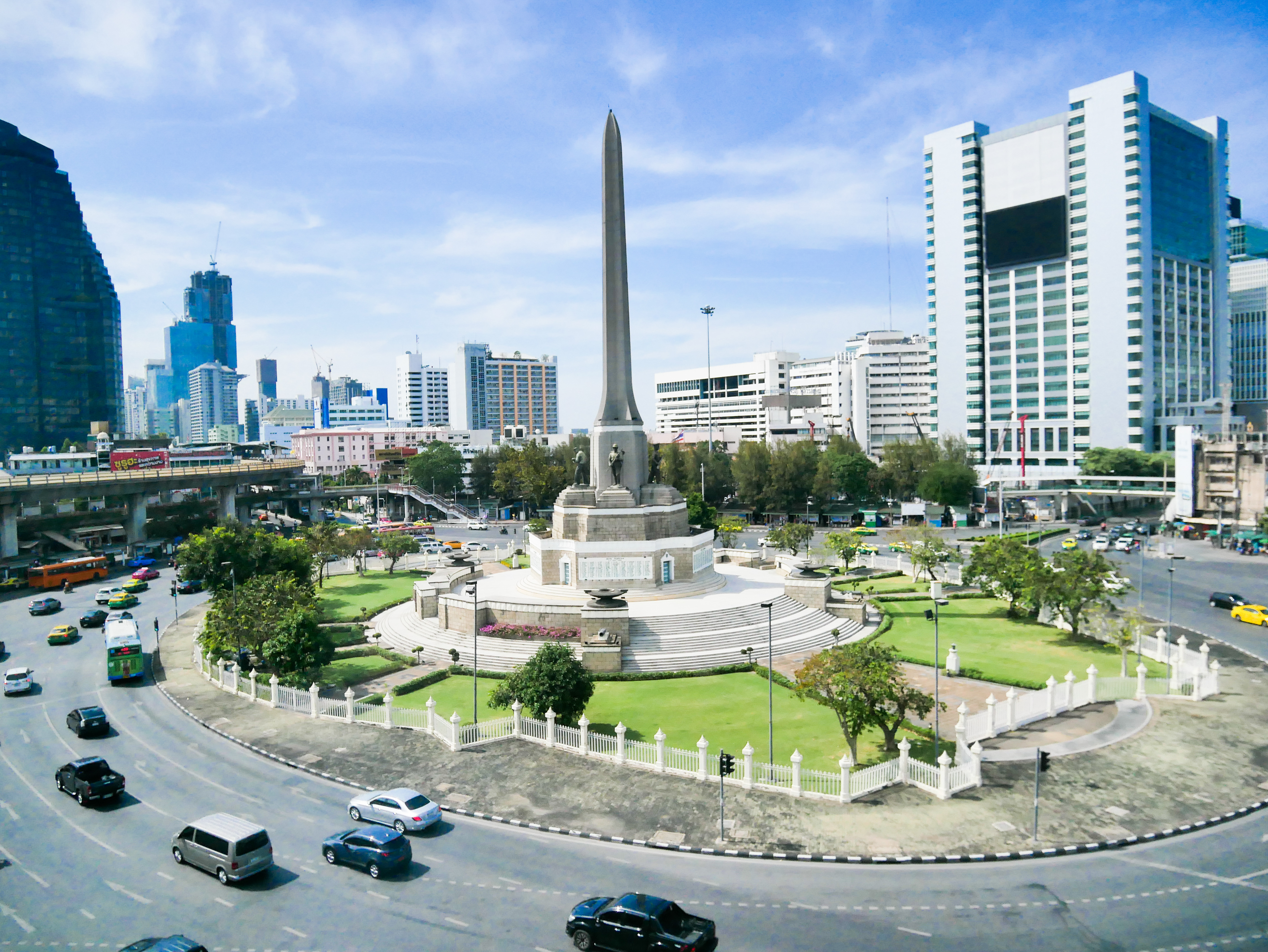
- The Victory Monument and Victory Monument BTS station in 2022
- Interactive map of Victory Monument
- Location: Ratchathewi District, Bangkok, Thailand
- Nearest metro station: Victory Monument Station
- Coordinates: 13°45′53″N 100°32′19″E
- North: Phahonyothin Road
- East: Ratchawithi Road
- South: Phaya Thai Road
- West: Ratchawithi Road

Construction
- Completion: 24 June 1942

Other
- Designer: Pum Malakul

Victory Monument (Thai: อนุสาวรีย์ชัยสมรภูมิ, RTGS: Anusawari Chai Samoraphum; lit. 'victorious battleground monument') is a military monument in Bangkok, Thailand. The monument was erected in June 1941 to commemorate the Thai victory in the Franco-Thai War. The monument is in Ratchathewi District, northeast of central Bangkok, at the center of a traffic circle at the intersection of Phahonyothin, Phaya Thai, and Ratchawithi roads. The area is served by Victory Monument BTS station (N3) on the Sukhumvit Line of the BTS Skytrain, which is located above Phaya Thai road. The station opened on 5 December 1999.

Since its erection in 1941, the monument has become a regular spot for protests along with the Democracy Monument, with recent protests taking place in 2022 where protesters attended rallies against Prayut Chan-o-cha.

== Design ==
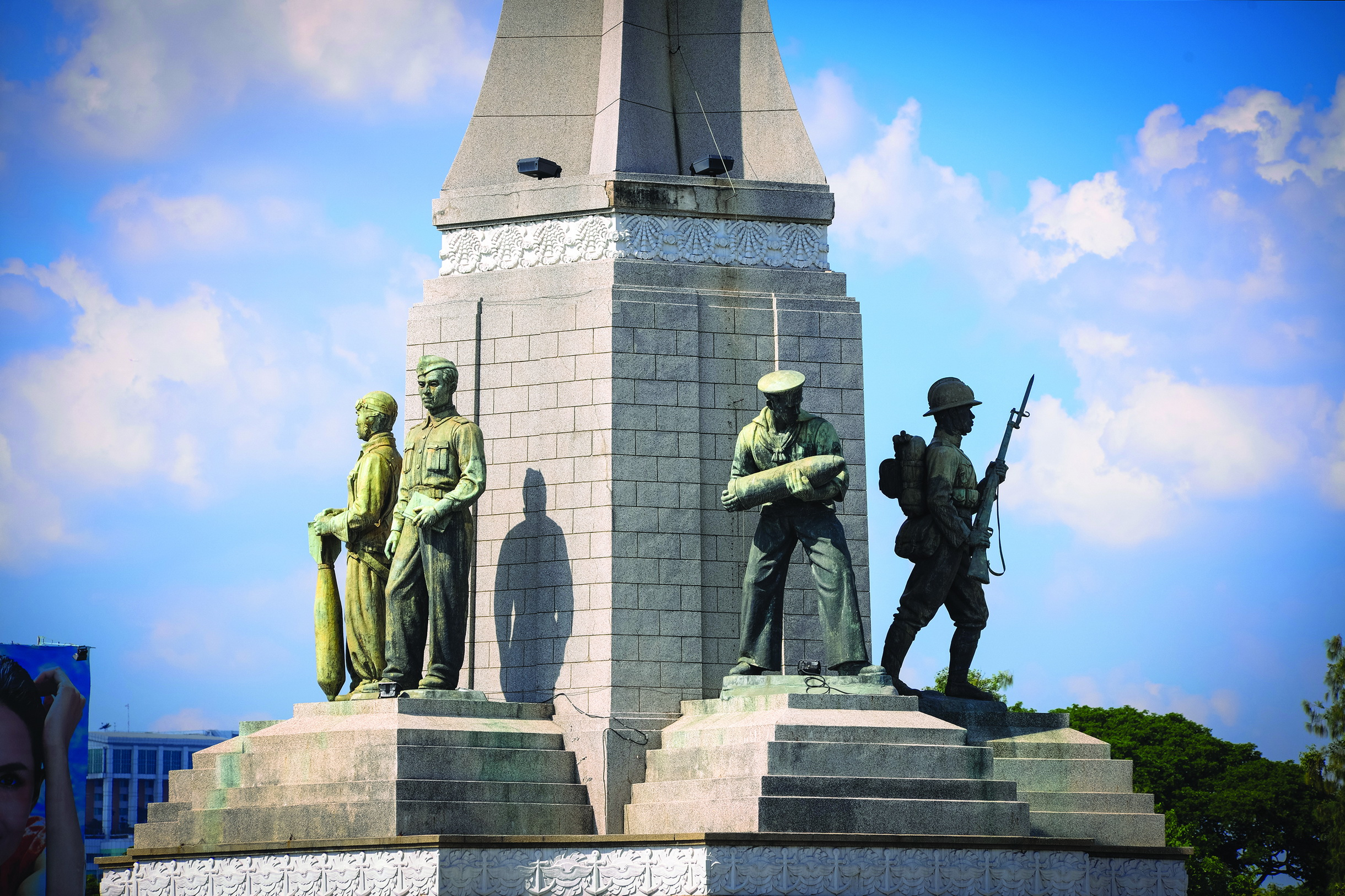
Five statues honor the army, navy, air force, police, and civilian population

The monument is entirely Western in design. This is in contrast with another prominent monument of Bangkok, the Democracy Monument, which uses indigenous Thai forms and symbols. The central obelisk, although originally Egyptian, has been frequently used in Europe and the US for national and military memorials, its shape suggesting both a sword and masculine potency. Here it is executed in the shape of five bayonets clasped together. Five statues, representing the army, navy, air force, police, and civilian population, are depicted in Western "heroic" style, familiar in the 1940s in both fascist and communist states. They were created by the Italian sculptor Corrado Feroci, who worked under the Thai name Silpa Bhirasri. The sculptor did not like the combination of his work with the obelisk, and referred to the monument as "the victory of embarrassment". On the obelisk is inscribed the names of 656 civilians and soldiers who lost their lives during the Franco-Thai War.

== History ==
In 1940–1941, Thailand fought a brief conflict against the Vichy French colonial authorities in French Indochina, this conflict was called the Franco-Thai War, which resulted in Thailand annexing some territories in western Cambodia and northern and southern Laos. These were among the territories which the Kingdom of Siam had ceded to France in 1893 and 1904, and nationalist Thais considered them to belong to Thailand.

The fighting between the Thais and the French in December 1940 and January 1941 was brief and inconclusive. 54 Thai troops were killed, with the French sustaining 421 killed or wounded. In the final territorial settlement was imposed on both parties by Japan, which did not want to see a prolonged war between two regional allies at a time when it was preparing to launch a war of conquest in Southeast Asia. Thailand's gains were less than it had hoped for, although more than the French wished to concede. Nevertheless, the Thai regime of Field Marshal Plaek Phibunsongkhram celebrated the outcome of the war as a victory, and the monument was commissioned, designed, and erected within a few months.

The monument became an embarrassment in a more political sense in 1945 After the Allies were victorious in the Pacific War, they forced Thailand to return the territories it had gained in 1941 to France. Many Thais regard the monument as an inappropriate symbol of militarism and a relic of what they now see as a discredited regime. Nevertheless, the monument remains one of Bangkok's most familiar landmarks.

=== Neighbourhood ===
Victory Monument is considered one of the most important landmarks of Bangkok. It serves as a central hub for the city's bus transportation, functioning both as a transit point and as the origin or destination for many bus routes. There is a saying "If you're lost or don't know how to get around Bangkok, start at Victory Monument."

The area where the monument stands was originally a large field known as Thung Phaya Thai. Nearby is a Buddhist temple that dates back to the Ayutthaya period, called Wat Apai Tharam, which is formerly and still colloquially known as Wat Makok. Khlong Samsen, a natural canal that flows in front of the temple, branches off from the Chao Phraya river in what is now Dusit District and winds its way eastward through this part of the city.

In the early Rattanakosin era, King Rama I and his younger brother, Prince Maha Sura Singhanat, traveled to the temple by boat via Khlong Samsen to attend a grand celebration that lasted seven days and seven nights. At that time, Thung Phaya Thai was still a sparsely populated outlying area of the capital.

During the reign of King Rama V, the king purchased land in the Dusit area as part of Bangkok's expansion beyond Rattanakosin Island. He ordered the construction of Dusit Palace and several roads, including Phaya Thai road and Ratchawithi road, both of which begin in this area.

Under the leadership of Prime Minister Field Marshal Plaek Phibunsongkhram, the area underwent major development as part of national modernization policies. Phaholyothin road was built as a highway leading to the northern region, and the area naturally became a traffic circle. Several hospitals were also established nearby, including Rajavithi Hospital, the Mother & Child Hospital (now Queen Sirikit National Institute of Child Health), the Hospital for Tropical Diseases, and Ramathibodi Hospital. At the time, public health services were still developing, and these hospitals served not only Bangkok residents but also people from the provinces.

Khlong Samsen was once home to hundreds of boat vendors selling kuaitiao ruea (boat noodles). Due to limited space on the boats, the noodles were served in small bowls, and the dish became extremely popular. The period from the 1970s to the early 1980s is considered the heyday of boat noodles in the Victory Monument area. Around 1985, during the term of Bangkok Governor Major General Chamlong Srimuang, a policy was introduced requiring boat noodle vendors to move their stalls onto land for better hygiene and to prevent encroachment on public waterways. This led to the area becoming a center for many long-standing boat noodle shops. At that time, it was also common to see freak shows performed for passengers waiting for buses.

Today, the area is served by Victory Monument BTS station (N3) on the BTS Skytrain's Sukhumvit Line, which runs above Phaya Thai road. The station opened on 5 December 1999.

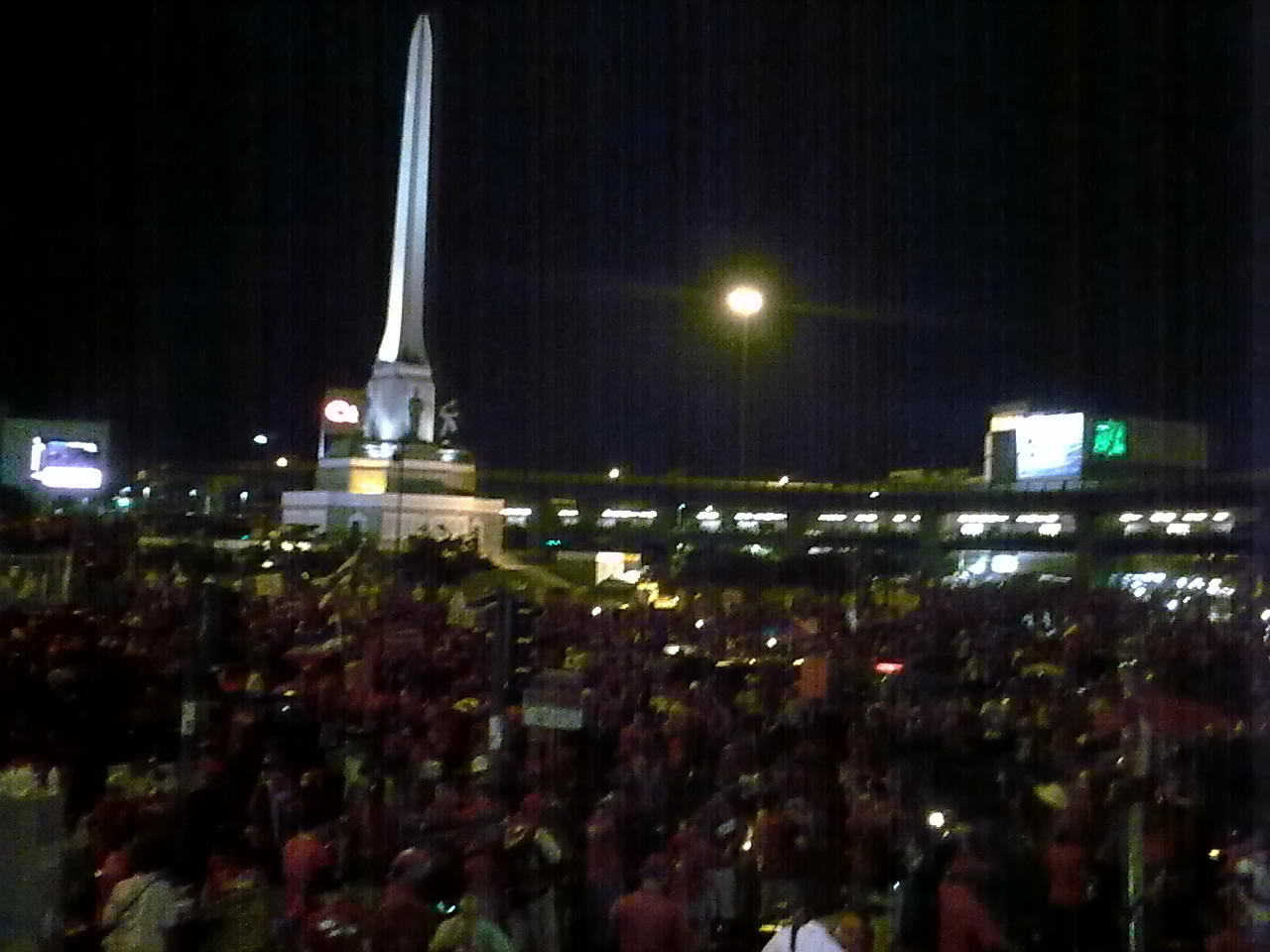
Red Shirt protestors gathering around the Victory Monument in 2009

=== Protests ===
During the 2020-2021 Thai Protests, protestors regularly battled with police around Bangkok including at the Victory Monument. In October 2020, around 10,000 protestors gathered at the monument and blocked local traffic. On August 7, 2021, a road near the monument was sealed off to prevent protestors from reaching the monument by police by using containers, although protestors had to be forced back with teargas. On August 11, another protest this time organized by Thalufa (also known as Tha Lu Fa) ended with a battle between protestors trying to march on the Prime-minister's residence and police: with the police responding with rubber bullets and teargas, and protestors by setting a police truck on fire and also throwing fireworks which injured 8 officers.

After the Thai Constitutional Court ruled that Prime-minister Prayut Chan-o-cha had not reached his term limit of 8 years in October 2022, the activist group Thalufah organized a protest at the Victory Monument with around 500 protesters attending.

== See also ==
Bonifacio Monument — A similar monument and roundabout in Caloocan, Philippines
