= Santiphap Park =

Park in Bangkok, Thailand

Coordinates: 13°45′47″N 100°32′29″E

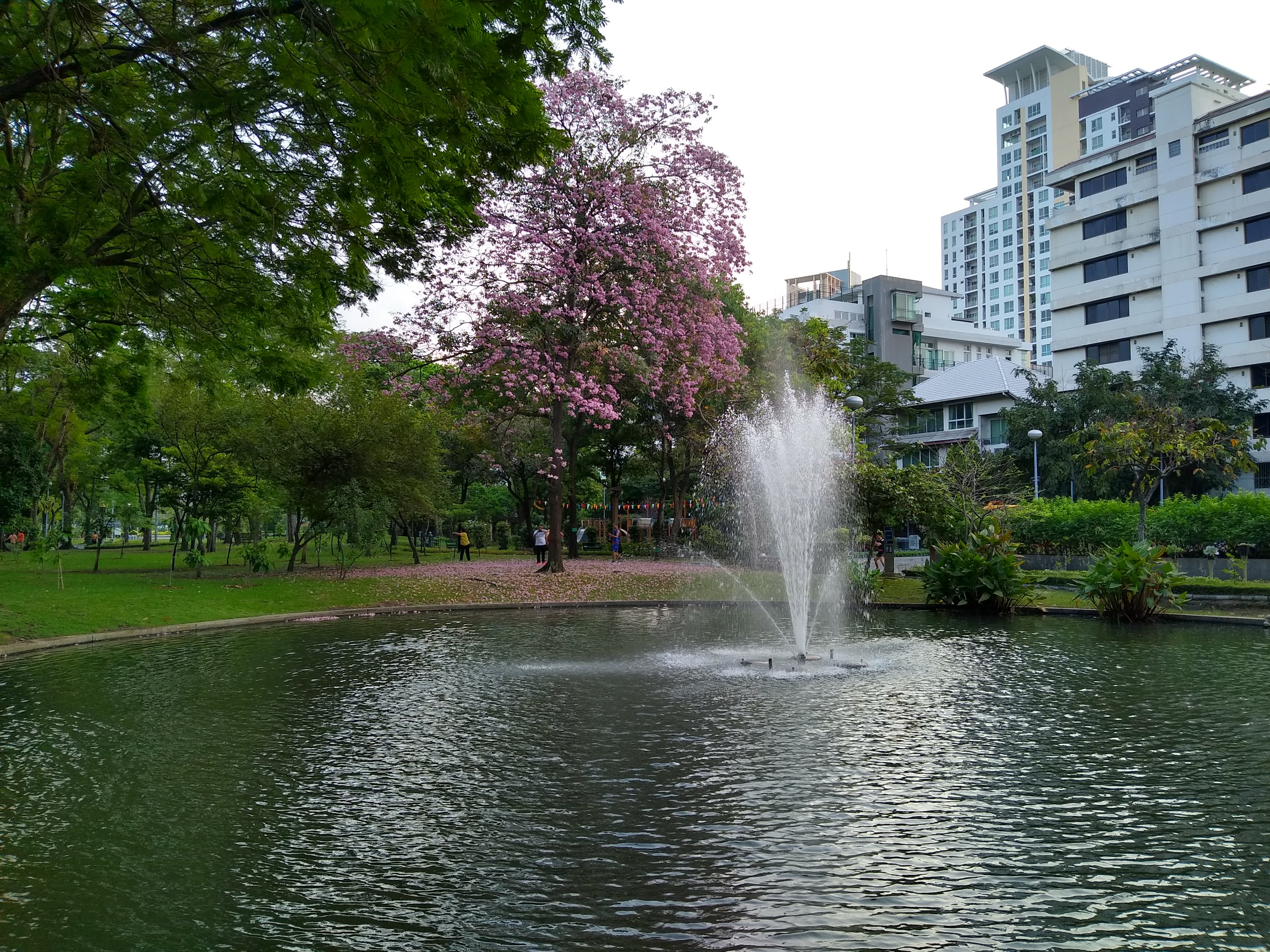
Santiphap Park

Santiphap Park (Thai: สวนสันติภาพ, RTGS: Suan Santiphap, literally "Peace Park") is an 8-acre (0.032 km^{2}) park in Bangkok, Thailand. It is located between Ratchawithi Road and Rang Nam Road in Ratchathewi district.

Location in green

The land on which Santiphap Park is built is leased from the Crown Property Bureau by the Bangkok Metropolitan Administration (BMA). It was previously the site of subsidized housing overseen by the National Housing Authority. The BMA obtained a 30-year lease, beginning in October 1990. Construction on the park began in 1997.

Santiphap Park was opened to the public on August 18, 1998. The name Santiphap, meaning "peace", as well as the date of the park's opening, commemorate the end of World War II, which took place 53 years earlier.

The dove is the symbol of Santiphap Park. A blackened bronze sculpture situated in the park's central pond depicts a dove carrying in its beak an olive branch with five blossoms, representing the spread of peace throughout the world. The sculpture is based on a drawing by Pablo Picasso.

The entrance signs to Santiphap Park are a facsimile of the handwriting of Buddhadasa Bhikkhu, a renowned Buddhist monk, philosopher and pacifist.

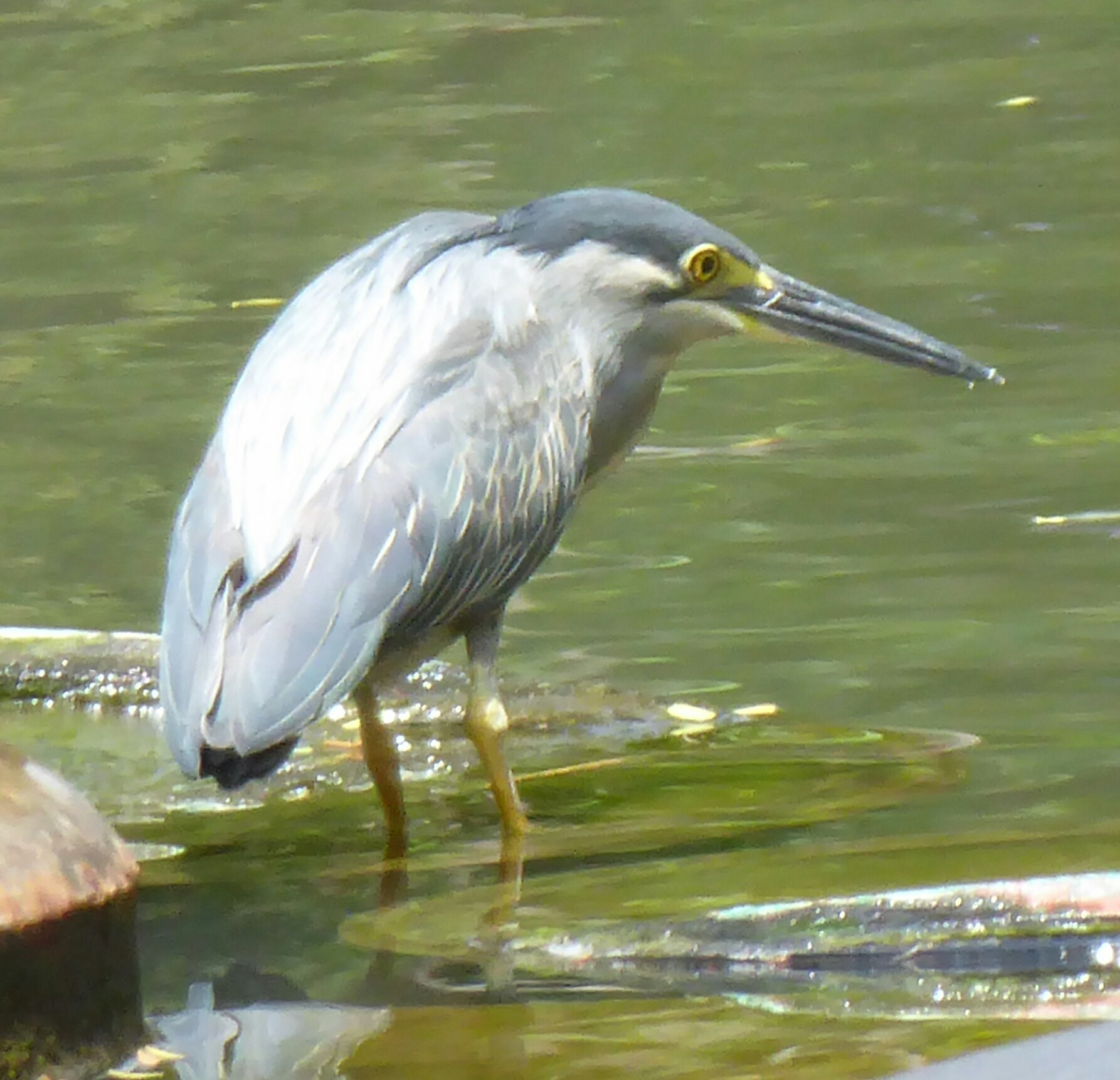
Striated Heron at Santiphap Park

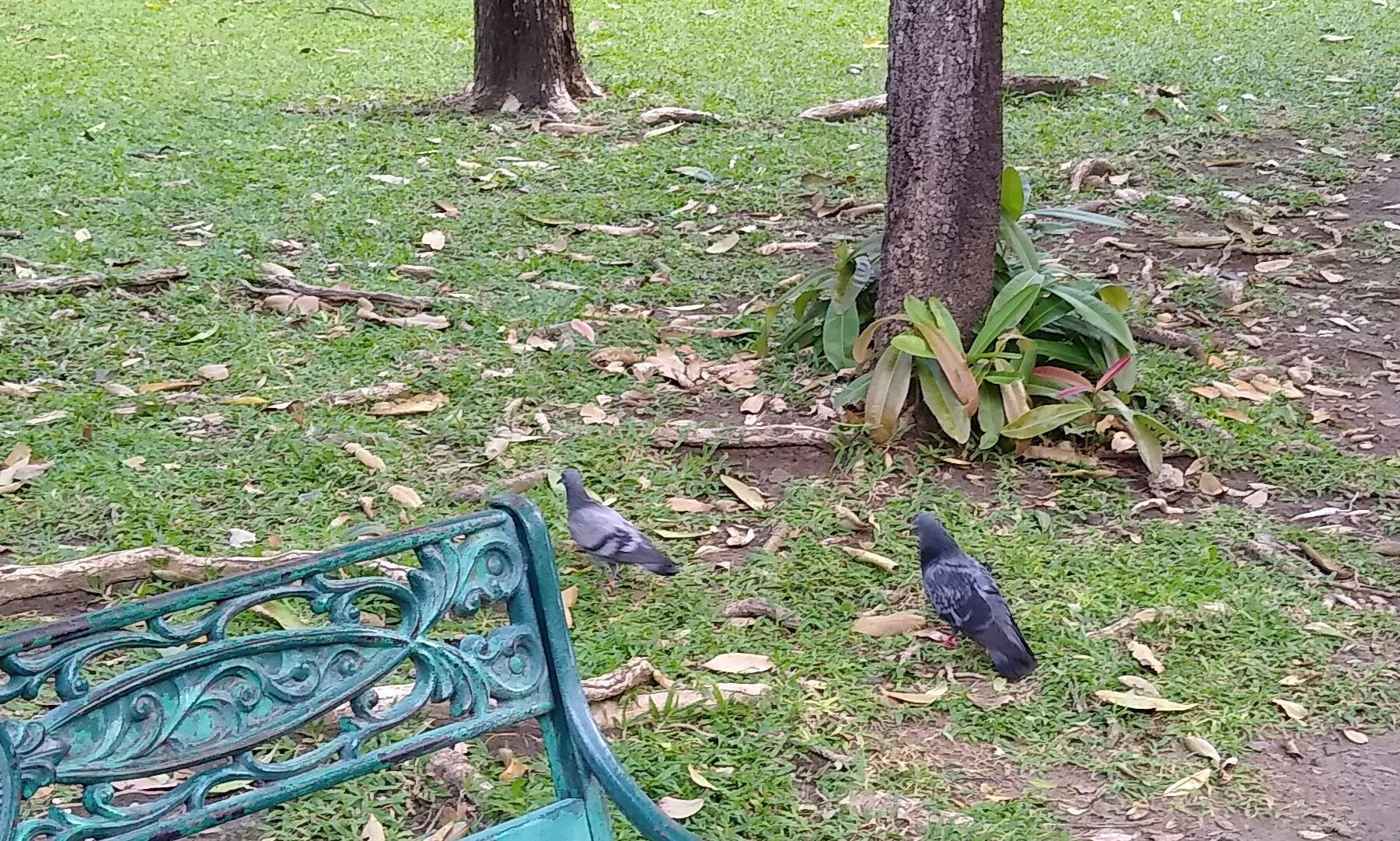
Feral Pigeons at Santiphap Park

Over 30 species of birds have been recorded in the park since its creation. Birds most often seen or heard there: feral pigeon, spotted dove, zebra dove, plaintive cuckoo, common koel, coppersmith barbet, Asian palm-swift, streak-eared bulbul, black-naped oriole, large-billed crow, oriental magpie-robin, pied fantail, black-collared starling, Asian pied starling, common myna, white-vented myna, olive-backed sunbird, scarlet-backed flowerpecker, Eurasian tree sparrow. Common winter (October–March) visitors: barn swallow, red-breasted flycatcher, inornate warbler. Species which are seen there less often (but all year round): striated heron, Javan pond-heron, little egret, painted stork, house swift, common iora, common tailorbird, yellow-vented bulbul, red-whiskered bulbul, house sparrow. Less common winter visitors: Chinese pond-heron, ashy drongo, brown shrike, Asian paradise-flycatcher. In the wasteland on which the park was later constructed, white-breasted waterhen, black-capped kingfisher, and verditer flycatcher were also recorded. Much more unusually for central Bangkok, orange-headed thrush and laced woodpecker have been recorded in a quieter condominium garden 50 m from the park.

The park contains a public address system which is used to broadcast a numbered list of park rules at 07:00, 08:00, 15:00, and 18:00; the national anthem at 08:00 and 18:00; and Thai music 07:00-10:00 and 15:00-18:00 most days. The rules and anthem are often audible from over a block away. Complaints by local residents have been ignored by the park management. The central circular paved area in the park is used for aerobics 18:00-18:45, weather permitting.

Santiphap Park is open from 05:00 until 21:00, and is used by 2–3,000 people on working days, and 3–4,000 on holidays.
