= Queen Sirikit National Institute of Child Health =

Queen Sirikit National Institute of Child Health สถาบันสุขภาพเด็กแห่งชาติมหาราชินี
- Department of Medical Services. MOPH

Geography
- Location: 420/8 Ratchawithi Road, Thung Phayathai Subdistrict, Ratchathewi, Bangkok, Thailand
- Coordinates: 13.766079°N 100.535214°E

Organisation
- Type: Teaching
- Affiliated university: College of Medicine, Rangsit University

Services
- Beds: 435

History
- Former name: Children's Hospital
- Founded: 24 June 1954

Links
- Website: www.childrenhospital.go.th
- Lists: Hospitals in Thailand

Queen Sirikit National Institute of Child Health (QSNICH) (Thai: สถาบันสุขภาพเด็กแห่งชาติมหาราชินี) is large public hospital located in Ratchathewi District, Bangkok, Thailand. It serves as a teaching hospital for the College of Medicine, Rangsit University.

== History ==
With plans to expand the pediatrics department of the Women's Hospital (now Rajavithi Hospital), the cabinet of Plaek Phibunsongkhram approved the construction of a pediatrics building with a capacity of 137 beds on Ratchawithi Road, which was to be operated by the Women's Hospital. The opening ceremony took place on 24 June 1954. By a 1973 royal decree of civil service management, operations were transferred to the Department of Medical Services of the Ministry of Public Health on 3 December 1974 and the building became the Children's Hospital. In 1996, the name was changed to Queen Sirikit National Institute of Child Health in commemoration of the Queen.

The institute was the first medical institution to offer a pediatrics training program that was not led under the University of Medical Sciences (now Mahidol University), and its setup was aided by the Faculty of Medicine Siriraj Hospital and Faculty of Medicine, Chulalongkorn University.

Rajavithi Hospital started providing medical education for students of the College of Medicine, Rangsit University since 1 June 1992. Students in this group also study at Rajavithi Hospital as a teaching hospital.

== See also ==
- Health in Thailand
