= Rajavithi Hospital =

Coordinates: 13°45′50″N 100°32′10″E

Rajavithi Hospital โรงพยาบาลราชวิถี
- Department of Medical Services. MOPH

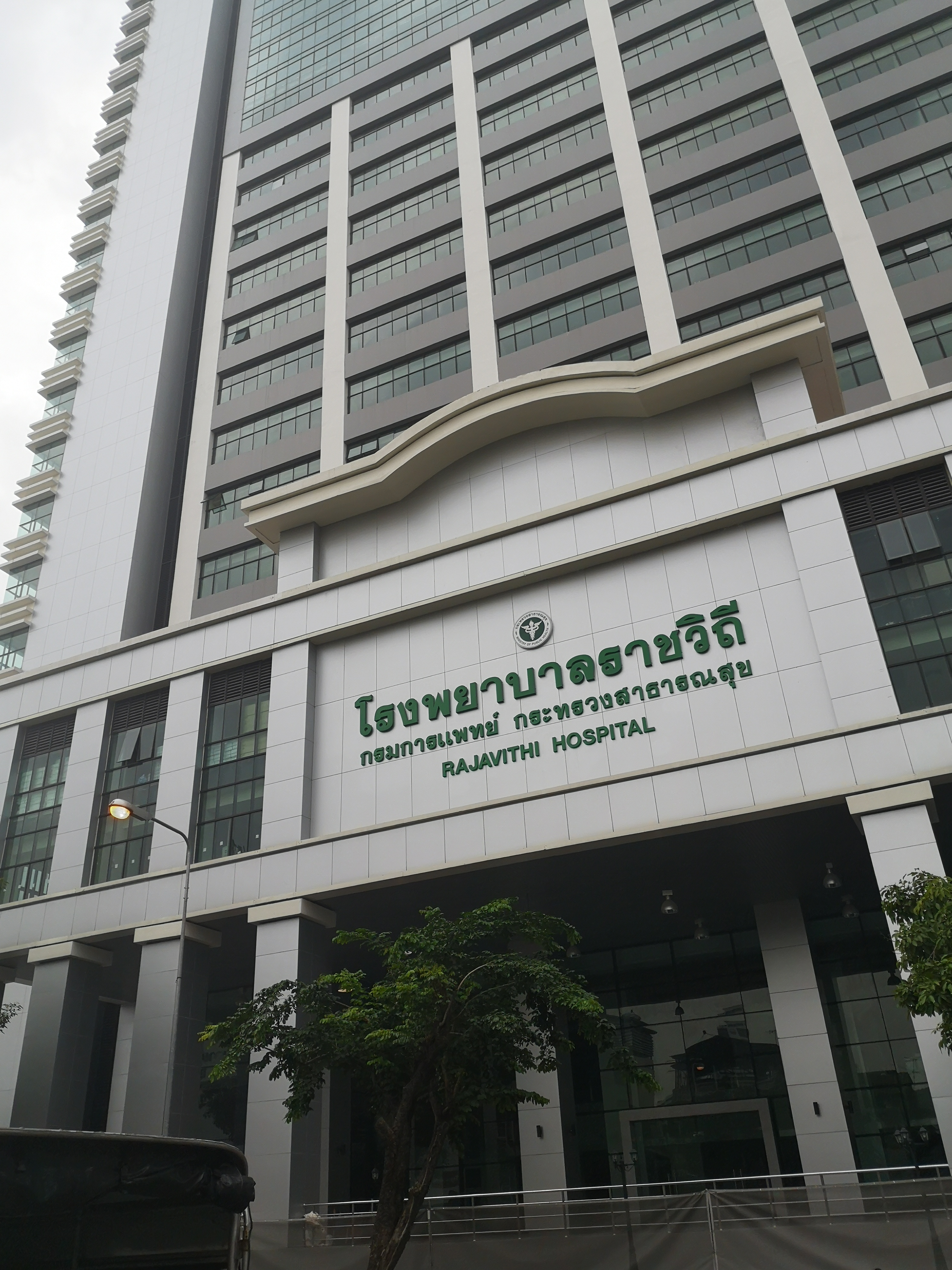

Geography
- Location: 2 Phaya Thai Road, Thung Phayathai Subdistrict, Ratchathewi, Bangkok, Thailand

Organisation
- Type: Teaching
- Affiliated university: College of Medicine, Rangsit University, Mahidol University

Services
- Beds: 1200

History
- Former name: Women's Hospital
- Founded: 16 April 1951

Links
- Website: www.rajavithi.go.th/eng/
- Lists: Hospitals in Thailand

Rajavithi Hospital (Thai: โรงพยาบาลราชวิถี) is large public hospital located in Ratchathewi District, Bangkok, Thailand. It was founded in 1951 as the Women's Hospital, and is operated by the Ministry of Public Health's Department of Medical Services. With an inpatient capacity of 1,200 beds, it is one of the largest hospitals in Thailand. It serves as a teaching hospital for the College of Medicine, Rangsit University.

== History ==
Rajavithi Hospital was founded as the Women's Hospital under the premiership of Plaek Phibunsongkhram, as part of his policy to establish large medical centres in Bangkok. Construction began in 1947, undertaken by the Department of Civil Engineering. The original buildings, designed in modified International Style, included an administration and outpatient building, a surgery and labour building, two patient wards, and staff residences. The hospital was officially opened on 16 April 1951, becoming the country's first specialized hospital for women's health.

One of the hospital's pioneers was Dr Sem Pringpuangkeo, who was director from 1951 to 1963 and in 1956 oversaw the successful separation of conjoined twins Wandee and Sriwan, the first such case in Thai history. He also founded the next-door Children's Hospital, in 1954. The hospital gradually diversified its patient services, adding surgery, internal medicine, and otolaryngology departments. But obstetrics for a long time remained the hospital's core service, seeing as many as 30,000 births yearly during 1960–1964.

In 1976, the hospital changed its policies to provide general healthcare as well and was renamed Rajavithi Hospital, a name conferred upon by King Bhumibol Adulyadej. In 1988, the hospital opened its heart centre and was the first in Asia to successfully operate a heart transplant using the 'Domino' procedure.

Rajavithi Hospital started providing medical education for students of the College of Medicine, Rangsit University since 1 June 1992. Students in this group also study at the Queen Sirikit National Institute of Child Health as a teaching hospital.

== Services ==
Rajavithi Hospital serves as the Department of Medical Services' largest tertiary referral centre, and is a major organ transplant facility. It also operates a large trauma unit, and its Narenthorn EMS Center, established in 1995, was the country's first emergency medical service provider. The hospital has about 250 medical doctors on staff, has 1,200 inpatient beds, and treats up to 1 million outpatients annually.

== See also ==
- Health in Thailand
- Hospitals in Thailand
- List of hospitals in Thailand
