= Childbirth in Thailand =

This article documents traditional and some modern childbirth practices in Thailand. Traditional principles are largely influenced by the folk beliefs in Central and North Thailand, and modern practices by the western medical model.

== Background ==
=== Health and illness theories ===
Traditional Thai medicine is based on the mixed indigenous traditions of Indian, Chinese, and Khmer influences. Historically, Jivaka Kumar Bhaccha is considered the "Father Doctor" of Thai medicine. The "circle of life" is a central concept in Thai medical philosophy, which involves the three essences of the human body that must be kept in balance to maintain health. The three essences are: (1) Energy (holds mind, body, and heart together, similar to qi/chi/prana), (2) Body (physical substance), and (3) Citta (mind/heart, non-physical being that holds all thoughts, emotions, spirit, inner self). Thai traditional medicine has three branches that correspond to the three essences: Thai massage, herbalism (including dietary regimen), and spiritual or religious healing. The three branches are used to balance each of the essences. For example, there are ten tastes of foods and herbs that are recognized by the Thai medicine, and tastes opposite of the disease process would be used to treat it. Similarly, the four elements of the body (fire, water, air, and earth) must be kept in balance by eating certain foods.

=== Women's health statistics ===
Female life expectancy at birth in Thailand is 76.08 years (as compared to 71.24 years for men). Two percent of Thai women smoke. The current (2011) birth rate is estimated to be 12.95 births per 1,000 population. The maternal mortality ratio is 20.63 per 100,000 live births, and the major causes of maternal death are hemorrhage (27.8%), sepsis (8.73%), toxemia (16.7%), amniotic fluid embolism (11.9%), and other causes (8.73%) (2003).

A high percentage of laboring women (97%) are attended by skilled health personnel, which is much higher than the regional average (49%) (2008). Women in Thailand are also much more likely to attend four or more ante-natal visits (74%) compared to women in other countries in Southeast Asia (43%) and use contraception (81% compared to 58%) (2008).

The under-5 mortality rate (per 1000 live births) has decreased to 14 (2008) from 28 (2002). Infant mortality has also decreased from 20 (2002) to 16.39 deaths per 1000 births (2011).

== Pregnancy behaviors and beliefs ==
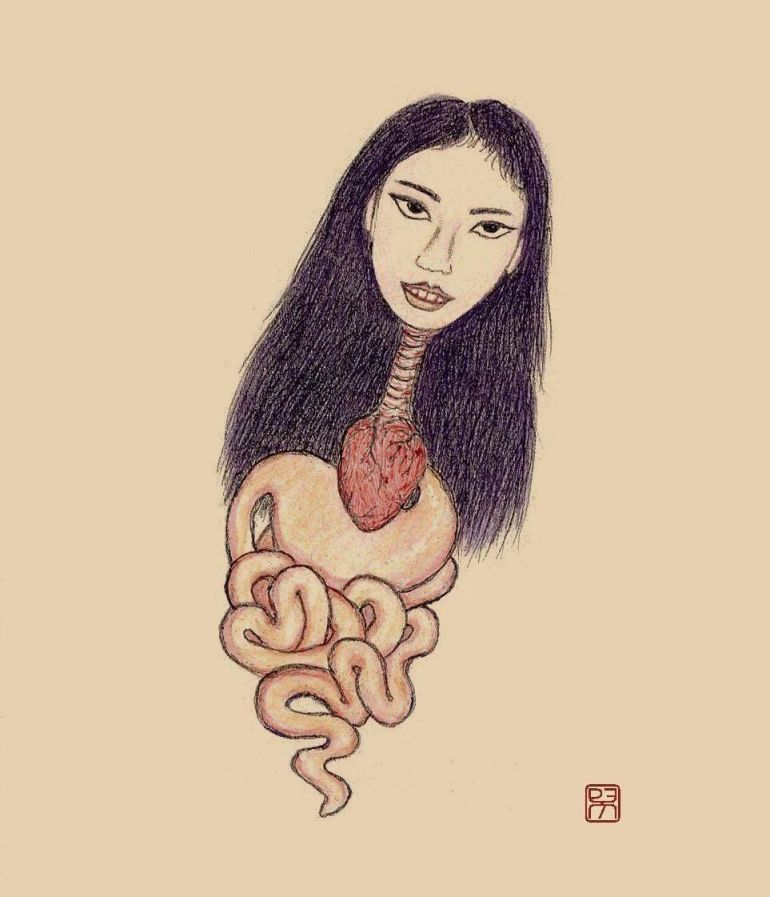
Krasue, a nocturnal ghost of Thai folklore haunting pregnant village women

There are many traditional beliefs associated with the way pregnancy should be carried out. According to the central Thai beliefs, conception occurs when a khwan (soul) flies into the womb during a sexual encounter. A woman whose period stops and who starts craving sour foods is thought to be pregnant. Once a woman finds out she is pregnant, she is to tell her partner first, followed by her mother and her mother-in-law. Infertility is seen as imbalance in one of the "essences". Certain acupressure points, however, are used to resolve the issue. Abortion is seen by Buddhists as "impeding an individual's rebirth and disobeying a religious prohibition on taking life". However, it has been legalised in Thailand on January 25, 2021, for pregnancies under 12 weeks.

Abortions in Thailand are currently allowed in the following cases: (1) the pregnancy is terminated during the first 12 weeks, (2) the pregnancy poses a threat to either the physical or mental health of the mother, (3) the pregnancy carries a high risk of health problems that may lead to infant deformities or disabilities, or (4) the pregnancy resulted from a sexual offence. Prior to legalisation of 1st trimester pregnancies, it was reported that about two-thirds of women sought help outside of the main healthcare system to terminate an unplanned pregnancy, and 12% attempted to do it themselves.

In Thai folklore there is a ghost known as Krasue (กระสือ) who haunts pregnant women in their homes just before or after the childbirth. Village legends say that it hovers around the house of the pregnant woman uttering sharp cries to instill fear. It uses an elongated proboscis-like tongue to reach the fetus or its placenta within the womb. This habit, among other unmentionable things that this spirit does, is believed to be the cause of many diseases affecting mainly rural women during their pregnancy.

=== Diet during pregnancy ===
Since pregnancy is considered to be a "hot" condition in Thai medicine, foods to maintain warmth are preferred, such as ginger tea, coconut milk, young coconut meat, salty foods, tamarind, fish, garlic, onion, and warm liquids. Those who consume pak plang, a slippery vine-like green vegetable, will have an easy birth, since it will make the baby's body slippery. Ya tom herbal medicine could be prepared as tea and would make the baby strong and easy to deliver if the pregnant woman drinks the tea three times a day for three consecutive days. However, khong salaeng (allergic foodstuffs) must be avoided by pregnant women, since it may cause unwanted problems during labor or for the unborn child. Khong salaeng foods include papaya salad, pickled food, spicy hot food (baby may be born hairless), coffee and tea (baby will be not intelligent), shellfish (prevents perineum from drying after delivery), and Thai eggplants (may cause anal pain after delivery). Women are also advised to eat only half a banana, since birth may become obstructed if she eats a whole banana.

=== Behavior during pregnancy ===
According to traditional beliefs, strenuous activities, such as heavy lifting, farm work, and even driving a car may lead to a miscarriage or stillbirth, however this may sometimes be unavoidable by the rural poor. Regular activity, however, would promote easy birth by making the abdomen "loose" (tong klon) and therefore aiding in the downward rotation of the baby. Idleness and frequent resting, on the other hand, complicates birth.

There are accounts that sexual activity was promoted during pregnancy in central Thailand since sperm would make the baby strong, however, in the northern parts of Thailand it is seen as a form of vigorous activity that may result in miscarriage. Although pregnant women are prohibited from attending a funeral, wearing a brooch on the abdomen would counteract any negative effects on the fetus. Women should also not make any advanced preparations, such as buying or making baby clothes, as this may result the death of the baby. Other pregnancy-related beliefs include not sitting in the stairway (causes obstructed birth), not burying anything in the soil (difficult birth), and having "magical showers" (to promote easy delivery and emotional calmness). These showers should be blessed with sacred words known as nam mon by mor mon' (a magical healer, or even a monk); they are usually done in an open-aired space from the eighth to ninth month of pregnancy. During the last weeks of normal pregnancy, a woman may choose to go to a masseuse for "lifting of the uterus (yok thong) to increase comfort".

=== Modern pregnancy ===
Today, pregnancy test kits are available at pharmacies. Pregnancy can also be confirmed at a gynecologist's office using blood and urine tests. Currently, pregnant women are required to attend at least four ante-natal visits. Normal pregnancies can be managed by gynecological nurses or midwives, while high-risk pregnancies must be monitored by obstetricians. Ideally, a woman would attend ante-natal check-ups "every month until 28 weeks of gestation, then every fortnight from 28–32 weeks and every week after 32 weeks", however, the number of visits will depend on the woman and her healthcare providers. In Thailand, ante-natal care is free in the public health services sector. There is a private and public sector in healthcare, the latter provided by the Ministry of Public Health and teaching hospitals. In the 2005 study by Liamputtong, et al., women of Chiang Mai (northern Thailand) revealed that they "only incorporate cultural knowledge when it is practicable and suitable to their daily living situations".

== Labor and birth ==
=== Setting ===
In the 1960s, 99% of the women in villages gave birth at home. Today the number is much lower, as most Thai women give birth in hospitals and clinics, generally where they go for ante-natal care. However, homebirths are becoming popular, but they may not be fully covered by insurance policies. Traditionally, Thai women would give birth at home, either in the bedroom or the kitchen. The delivery room at home is usually decorated with Yant Trinisinghé, "small flags inscribed with sacred numbers from one to nine" or with letters and signs; each flag is a "symbol of a long mantra passage, believed to have power to ward off evil spirits". Buffalo leather can be used instead of flags.

=== Birth assistant and attendants ===
According to WHO's 2008 Thailand health profile, 99% of urban, 97% or rural, and 93% of the poorest 20% of women have their children delivered by skilled health persons, which is a much better compared to the regional average of 49%. As a part of the four-year curriculum, all nurses go through half a year of midwifery training, and may later choose to specialize. However, an obstetrician carries most responsibility during a birth in the hospitals It is unclear how the traditional delivery assistants are trained, but most likely through observational experiences.

The traditional delivery assistant, who is usually a woman, is called Mo Tamaye in the central Thailand and Mae Jang in the north. It is generally accepted that labor starts when the water breaks. If the family cannot get to the nearest medical facility, or does not want to, Mo Tamaye is called. Usually, the husband and Mo Tamaye are present during delivery, but relatives and children may attend as well; however, the woman in labor must be covered from the waist to knee.

=== Birth positions ===
There are variations in the traditional birthing positions. In one, a folded mattress would be supporting a woman's back while her husband would provide support sitting behind her and letting her grab onto his thighs. There would be foot supports made out of bamboo that a woman can push on during contractions. In another position, a woman would be sitting, with Mo Tamaye supporting her from behind, and would pull on a rope that is hanging from the ceiling to alleviate some pain. The woman must take an active role in the process by breathing and pushing with contractions, with the help of Mo Tamaye. In a medical setting, a woman would most likely have limited options for positions and would be laid flat on the bed to deliver. Culturally, there is no need to keep silent during the birthing process, but pain management is available in most clinics. There are no data regarding the use of fetal monitoring; however, it is likely used in the westernized hospital settings, which would limit woman's mobility during labor. Samitivej Srinakarin Hospital in Bangkok is currently the only hospital in the country that offers natural and water birth.

=== Traditions during labor ===
In case of birth complications, the traditional birth assistant would give the woman some holy water or press on her belly. There were no specific foods mentioned to eat during labor. To promote an easy delivery, all windows and doors must be open and the woman must be facing east to symbolize the emergence of new life. The husband should also pile logs outside facing east. Any fastened nails must be undone, and no one should be nailing nails to avoid stalled birth. To be born with an umbilical (holy) cord wrapped abound neck was considered a sign of fortune.

=== Caesarean section ===
In the medical model of pregnancy, Caesarean section is performed should complications arise. However, the rate of C-sections has been increasing globally, which may be due to financial incentives. Thailand is no exception, with rates rising from 15.2% (1990) to 22.4% (1996) to 34% (2007). A study in 2000 concluded that "private cases have a 5.83 higher chance of primary cesarean section than non-private cases" because "physicians feel obliged to provide personal delivery services, when triggered by leisure and time conflict, [which] leads to higher and possibly unnecessary cesarean procedures".

== Postpartum ==
The postpartum period begins right after the birth of the child, but it is not specified when it ends. It takes place at home following home birth, or in the hospital for 2–3 days and then at home following hospital birth.

=== The cord and placenta ===
Following a traditional delivery, Mo Tamaye would milk the umbilical cord three times away from the baby “to remove dirt,” then push it back, tie the cord in two places with a special cotton string, and cut the cord in between the two fastened places. The cut cord is then burned, and placenta is buried, usually by the father.

=== Woman's rite of passage ===
After a woman gives birth to her first child, she is considered an adult. She then undergoes the Yu Fai when she must "lie near fire" for an odd number of days, usually around 11 days, so that her uterus will shrink back to normal size. After each following birth, the number of days spent near fire may be decreased. Also, a wooden box with a fire pot may be placed on the woman's stomach to serve the same purpose. Fire is also said to scare off evil spirits, especially combined with the lemongrass aroma. After a Yu Fai, a woman is allowed to move out of her parents' residence, where she would live before and during the pregnancy, since she is now a mature adult.

=== Postpartum diet and behavior ===
As with the pregnancy diet, warm foods are encouraged, such as hot curries. A woman's diet must consist of rice and vegetables in the first few months after pregnancy; meat, with exception of fish, must be avoided. From a traditional Thai medicine perspective, "sour tastes [do] not dry out the body, but built up water; egg [is] too cooling; jackfruit [brings] in wind [air]; glutinous rice and the sugar of sweets wet the uterus; fruits [do] not give strength and [are] excessively cooling". Herbal teas (naam puu loey) should be consumed, and showers with herbal water (naam puu loeyand naam bai paw) should be taken daily without washing hair the first two weeks.

=== Postnatal care and maternal leave ===
Household duties would be taken care by female relatives, and older children. Traditionally, female relatives would also check on the new mother. Within 4 to 8 weeks a woman must attend a health clinic for a check-up and to register her child's birth. Labour Protection Act of 1998 guarantees women to have three months of maternity leave, to retain the job a woman had prior to pregnancy, and to temporary change duties with a doctor's letter. In practice, labor rights are very weak in Thailand and these laws are not generally enforceable. Labor activists are prosecuted, migrant laborers are exploited, and trafficked workers in the sex and fishing industries are common.

== Newborn ==
=== Traditional rituals ===
There are many variations in tradition across Thailand most include the beautification of the child. Central Thai people say the baby is tog fag (falls on bamboo) when he or she is born. After Mo Tamaye cuts the umbilical cord, she washes and beautifies the baby with yellow and white powder. On the third day after birth, the Lon Dek Nai Kadon rite (translates to "rock the cradle in which a new born baby is sleeping") is carried out. A baby is placed into a basket with a pencil and a notebook (for brightness) and money (for richness); girls are also given knives (to cut and comb hair) (Attagara 1968, p. 103) and cooking utensils. The basket with the baby and instruments is then handed over to "a respectable man in the village". This means that the baby became his adopted child temporarily, which reflects that the parents expect their baby to be rich and respectable like the adoptive.”

Another tradition includes making offerings at a temple (wat) on the third day after the baby is born to obtain a blessing from a monk. The "fire shaving ceremony" takes place when the child reaches the age of one month and one day, which involves cutting of the baby's hair. As a precaution, babies must be kept away from the rain. Circumcision is not very prevalent in Thailand; only 13% of Thai's male population was circumcised as of 2007. In 2016, the prevalence was lower, at 11.9%.

It is not specified when the newborn period ends. There is also no information on the significance of vernix, the baby's rest, activity, and movement, as well as meconium and handling of the urine and feces.

=== Care for the baby ===
For the first month of the baby's life, the mother must stay very close and "breastfeed the newborn on its slightest demand". Babies are also sometimes given a mixture of banana, honey, and water to prevent diarrhea. If the baby cries too much and cannot sleep, it is believed that the baby's guardian spirit, Mae Sue, is teasing the newborn too much. Usual interaction with Mae Sue is normal, during which the baby will play and laugh by itself.

=== Naming ===
Traditionally, a name is given to the child on the fourth or fifth day after birth by the father, however, there are variations in this practice across Thailand. Today, both the mother and father can take part in deciding on a name. A child may not hold the same name as royalty.

=== Twins ===
There is a variation in the view of twins. While some view twins as needing more resources and being too demanding on a family, others see having twins as lucky, since it is convenient to take care of them at the same time.

=== Modern newborn care ===
An infant is examined in the first week of life followed by six examinations in the first year. There are three examinations during the second year, and six examinations every other year until the child turns six. Vaccines coincide with the exams, but are not obligatory except for the BCG for tuberculosis prevention.
