= Health in Thailand =

Seal of Ministry of Public Health of Thailand

Thailand has "a long and successful history of health development," according to the World Health Organization. Life expectancy is averaged at eighty years. Non-communicable diseases form the major burden of morbidity and mortality, while infectious diseases including malaria and tuberculosis, as well as traffic accidents, are also important public health issues.

The Human Rights Measurement Initiative finds that Thailand is fulfilling 91.0% of what it should be fulfilling for the right to health based on its level of income in 2022.

== Water and sanitation ==
In 2008, 98 percent of the population had access to an improved water source. Ninety-six percent of the population have access to improved sanitation facilities.

=== Tap water ===
The Ministry of Public Health surveyed 10,271 tap water plants nationwide from 2018 to 2024. Only 420 (4%) of all villages had tap water production that was hygienic enough for human consumption. The Public Health Ministry aims to have 1,750 additional village tap-water plants meet hygiene standards in 2025. Tap water in Bangkok meets international drinking water quality standards. A 2022 questionnaire with 374 Bangkok residents showed that 51.87% consider it acceptable to drink tap water. Among them, 82.99% found tap water drinkable and 9.79% drank water directly from the tap.

In 2021, the Chao Phraya River had a drought and there was a sea level surge. This contributed to a higher concentration of sodium in the water supply of Bangkok which is harmful to children and people with heart diseases. The high sodium continued throughout February 2020.

Some households use a water purifier with reverse osmosis to filter tap water. A point of use water filter is useful for potable water. Portable water purification devices are used for treating raw water.

== Life expectancy and mortality ==
Life expectancy 1937-2021

Thailand ranks 86th for life expectancy in the world in 2023. These estimations are by the analytical agency of the UN.

In 2011, the average national life expectancy at birth was 78 years for females, and 71 years for males. By 2023, this average increased to 80.86 for women, and 72.16 for men. The average life expectancy for the Thai population in general was 76.41 in 2023. The average life expectancy at birth varies greatly by regions. It is higher in the more affluent Central Thailand, and lower in Southern Thailand.

Thailand has a relatively low rate of infant mortality, 6.3 deaths vs 1,000 live births (2024 est.), the 165th lowest in the world.

== Soft drugs ==
=== Alcohol ===
In 2023, 10.05% of the population (5.73 million people) indulged in heavy drinking. Alcoholism is the second leading cause of death after smoking in Thailand. A 2024 study found that the annual alcohol-attributable deaths was 20,039 (men: 17,726 [6.50% of total Thai population] and women: 2312 [1.11%]). Nearly 60% of men and 25% of women regularly consume alcohol.

In December 2023, the WHO's Alcohol Use Disorders Identification Test (AUDIT) found that 4,236 (31.25%) of the 13,556 participants were at risk of liver disease. 3,469 of the at risk participants had their liver tested. The results showed 24.47% or 849 had abnormal liver enzyme levels.

Alcohol is a major economic burden in Thailand. Alcohol consumption incurred a total economic cost of circa 165,450.5 million baht (1.02% of GDP) and 2500 baht per capita in 2021. Cost of premature mortality was circa 157,918.7 million baht (95.45% of the total cost). Healthcare cost was second at 4370.1 million baht (2.7% of the total cost). The number of premature deaths attributable to alcohol consumption was estimated at 22,804 in 2021.

=== Cannabis ===
In 2019, there were circa 350,000 Thais who were habitual cannabis users according to the Narcotics Control Board. This exceeded 700,000 in 2024. The number rose significantly after the decriminalization of cannabis in 2022. In 2025, the Public Health Ministry passed regulations which limits the amount of cannabis sold to 30 days' use, and prohibits the sale of cannabis via vending machines, electronic channels and computer networks.

=== Tobacco ===
Smoking is a major public health issue in Thailand. In 2021, tobacco smoking was the 2nd highest risk factor which caused most deaths and disability combined in Thailand. There were an estimated 66.3 thousand tobacco-related deaths in 2021. 56.9 thousand (85.7%) were due to smoking, and 10.5 thousand or 15.8% were due to secondhand smoke.

In 2022, 19% of the total population used tobacco. The smokers were 37.7% males and only 1.8% females. Cigarette consumption peaked in 2014 and declined by 24% in 2022. Thailand is a major tobacco producer with a 11.6% production increase since 2010.

== Diseases ==
Non-communicable diseases form the major burden of mortality in Thailand, while infectious diseases including malaria and tuberculosis, as well as traffic accidents, are also important public health issues. The mortality rate is 205 per 1,000 adults for those aged between 15 and 59 years. The under-five mortality rate is 14 per 1,000 live births. The maternal mortality ratio is 48 per 100,000 live births (2008).

Years of life lost, distributed by cause, was 24 percent from communicable diseases, 55 percent from non-communicable diseases, and 22 percent from injuries (2008).

=== Infectious diseases ===
Major infectious diseases in Thailand also include bacterial diarrhea, hepatitis, dengue fever, malaria, Japanese encephalitis, rabies, and leptospirosis. The prevalence of tuberculosis is 189 per 100,000 population.

=== Dengue fever ===
The first case of dengue fever was recorded in Thailand in 1949. Since then, it has been controlled, but not eradicated. Dengue cases soared in 2019. During the first six months of 2019, 28,785 people contracted dengue fever in Thailand. Forty-three died. The 2019 figures are double the five-year average and exceeds 2018's full-year total of 14,900 infections and 19 deaths. There is no treatment for dengue fever.

=== STDs among youth ===
In 2024, the Disease Control Department reported a surge of sexually transmitted diseases (STDs) among youth due to unsafe sex. The number of patients suffering from syphilis increased 2.5 times in 2023 compared to 2018, while the number tripled among adolescents. The high number of syphilis cases suggests many people have unsafe sex. Thailand has an estimated 0.5-0.8% yearly rate of HIV infections. 47% of the 9,000 new annual cases were among young people aged between 15-24.

=== HIV/AIDS ===
Since HIV/AIDS was first reported in Thailand in 1984, 1,115,415 adults had been infected as of 2008, with 585,830 having died since 1984. 532,522 Thais were living with HIV/AIDS in 2008. In 2009 the adult prevalence of HIV was 1.3%. As of 2009, Thailand had the highest prevalence of HIV in Asia.

The government has begun to improve its support to persons with HIV/AIDS and has provided funds to HIV/AIDS support groups. Public programs have begun to alter unsafe behaviour, but discrimination against those infected continues. The government has funded an antiretroviral drug program and, as of September 2006, more than 80,000 HIV/AIDS patients had received such drugs.

The American Centers for Disease Control and Prevention (CDC) conducted a study in partnership with the Thailand Ministry of Public Health to ascertain the effectiveness of providing people who inject drugs illicitly with daily doses of the anti-retroviral drug Tenofovir as a prevention measure. The results of the study were released in mid-June 2013 and revealed a 48.9 percent reduced incidence of the virus among the group of subjects who received the drug, in comparison to the control group who received a placebo. The principal investigator of the study stated in Lancet, "We now know that pre-exposure prophylaxis can be a potentially vital option for HIV prevention in people at very high risk for infection, whether through sexual transmission or injecting drug use."

=== Leprosy ===
The prevalence of leprosy (Hansen's disease) in Thailand is declining. Statistics from the Ministry of Public Health's Department of Disease Control indicate that there were 155 new leprosy patients countrywide in 2015, as compared to the 405 new cases found in 2010. Leper colonies are found in Chanthaburi, Nan, Chiang Rai, Maha Sarakham, Surin, Roi Et, Khon Kaen, and Nakhon Si Thammarat.

=== Malaria ===
In 2017 there were 11,440 confirmed cases of malaria in Thailand with 11 reported fatalities. The nation has committed to becoming malaria-free by 2024. In 2017, the Health Ministry declared 35 of Thailand's 76 provinces malaria-free. The persistence of malaria in border regions and the increasing drug resistance of new strains jeopardize the achievement of that goal. The WHO hopes to eliminate malaria by 2025.

== Nutrition ==
=== Food safety ===
Food safety scares are common to Thailand. Besides, common is microbial contamination of street food left out in the hot sun and dusty roads as well as store food contamination by banned or toxic pesticides and fake food products.

In July 2012 consumer action groups demanded four unlisted toxic pesticides found on common vegetables at levels 100 times the EU guidelines (which are banned in developed countries) be banned. Chemical companies are requesting to add them to the Thai Dangerous Substances Act so they can continue to be used, including on exported mangoes to developed countries which have banned their use. In 2014, Khon Kaen University concluded after a study, that Thailand should ban 155 types of pesticides, with 14 listed as urgent: Carbofuran, Methyl Bromide, Dichlorvos, Lambda-cyhalothrin, Methidathion-methyl, Omethoate, Zeta Cypermethrin, Endosulfan sulfate, Aldicarb, Azinphos-methyl, Chlorpyrifos-ethyl, Methoxychlor and Paraquat.

=== Sugar and salt consumption ===
As of 2019 sugar consumption in Thailand is 28 teaspoons (131 grams) per person per day, four times the World Health Organization (WHO) recommendation. Excessive consumption of sugar leads to obesity, a public health issue. Thailand is number two in ASEAN, behind Malaysia, in the prevalence of obesity. In 2017, Thailand levied an excise tax on sugary drinks to pressure manufacturers to reduce the amount of sugar put in their products. A hike in the tax expected in October 2019.

According to WHO in 2017, Thais consume an average of 10.8 grams of salt per day (over 4,000 milligrams of sodium), a rate more than double the recommended daily intake of salt. The main sources of salt are salt added during cooking, packaged food, and street food. Researchers claim that more than 22 million Thais suffer from salt-related ailments. Each year 20,000 of them die from related diseases, costing the country losses estimated at 98.9 billion baht a year. Thai health officials are calling for a tax on high-sodium food products to reduce demand.

=== Diabetes ===
The International Diabetes Federation (IDF) stated the number of adults (20–79 years) with diabetes in Thailand increased sixfold between 2000 and 2024. There were 1.5 million cases in 2000, 4 million in 2011, and 6.36 million in 2024. In 2025, Thailand ranked the 4th highest country with the number of adults with diabetes in the Western Pacific. In 2024, circa 2.12 million people (33.3% of patients) were undiagnosed. In 2024, 8.97 million Thais reported to have impaired glucose tolerance (IGT), while 4.37 million had impaired fasting glucose (IFG). The healthcare costs of diabetes reached US$4.11 billion (136.47 billion baht) in 2024.

=== Antibiotic abuse ===
A study by the health ministry and Britain's Wellcome Trust released in September 2016 found that an average of two people die every hour from multi-drug resistant bacterial infections in Thailand. That death rate is much higher than in Europe. The improper use of antibiotics for humans and livestock has led to the proliferation of drug-resistant microorganisms, creating new strains of "superbugs" that can be defeated only by "last resort" medicines with toxic side effects. In Thailand, antibiotics are freely available in pharmacies without a prescription and even in convenience stores. Unregulated use of antibiotics on livestock is also problematic. Drug-resistant bacteria spreads through direct contact between humans and farm animals, ingested meat, or the environment. Antibiotics are often used on healthy animals to prevent, rather than treat, illnesses.

In November 2016, Thailand announced its intent to halve antimicrobial-resistant (AMR) infections by 2021, joining the global battle against "superbugs". It aims to reduce the use of antibiotics in humans by 20 percent and in animals by 30 percent. The health minister said that about 88,000 patients develop AMR infections a year. The infections claim at least 38,000 lives in Thailand each year, causing 42 billion baht in economic damage. Without measures to address the issue, he said that the world would enter a "post-antibiotic era" with at least 10 million people around the world dying from AMR by 2050, 4.7 million of them in Asia.

== Suicide ==
The Department of Mental Health surveyed 6 million Thais between 1 Jan 2020 - 20 Feb 2025 and found that 9.14% (560,000 people) were at risk of depression, 5.18% (300,000 people) were at risk of suicide, and 7.87% (480,000 people) had high stress levels. More than 1.3 million Thais aged 15 and above were living with depression in 2024.

Individuals aged 20-29 had the highest risk of committing suicide. Psychiatric and substance abuse patients has increased by circa 500,000 since 2020. In 2024, there were 5,217 suicide deaths in Thailand (8.02 per 100,000 persons). This equals to 15 deaths per day, or 1 death per 2 hours. 33,000 people attempted suicide (93 attempts per day) in 2024.

== Teen pregnancies ==
Thailand had 35 cases of teen pregnancies for every 1,000 girls from the ages of 15 to 19 in 2018. Health officials have set a target of 25 cases per 1,000 by 2026. In 2014, some 334 babies were born daily in Thailand to mothers aged between 15 and 19.

== Environment and disease ==
=== Pollution ===
The World Bank estimates that deaths in Thailand attributable to air pollution has risen from 31,000 in 1990 to roughly 49,000 in 2013.

== Medical scandals ==
On 8 December 2023, a Taiwanese tourist named Di-Long Chen was critically injured in a hit-and-run car accident. Vibraham Hospital turned away the injured tourist, because they didn't accept patients and didn't know how to seek reimbursement from the foreigner. Paramedics took the tourist to a state hospital 10 km away, but he died while in a traffic jam.

== See also ==
- Abortion in Thailand
- Childbirth in Thailand
- Healthcare in Thailand
