= List of cinemas in Thailand =

Cinemas in Thailand are popular venues for entertainment. Especially in Bangkok, the movie theaters tend to be multiplex facilities offering many other forms of entertainment besides movies, such as bowling or karaoke, along with restaurants and small shops.

The films playing in Thai cinemas are usually Hollywood features, which tend to dominate the box-office. There is a burgeoning Thai film industry that is making dozens of films each year that are increasingly popular with local audiences. Films from other Asian countries, such as Korea, Japan and Hong Kong, are popular as well.

The movie-theater business in Thailand is led by the Major Cineplex Group, which owns the Major Cineplex chain as well as the EGV chain and operates the Paragon Cineplex at Siam Paragon as well as Thailand's IMAX theaters. Behind the combined Major Cineplex-EGV, which has a 50 percent market share, the SF Group is the No. 2 operator, with a 35 percent share. Smaller chains include Apex in Bangkok's Siam Square, Thana Cineplex, Major Hollywood and UMG. In Chiang Mai, there is the Vista cinema. In Southern Thailand, there is the Coliseum chain.

As of 2007, there were 570 screens in Thailand, with 300 in the Bangkok metropolitan area. Nationwide, the person-to-screen ratio is 170 people per screen, with a 30:1 ratio in Bangkok.

== Ticketing, seating and customs ==
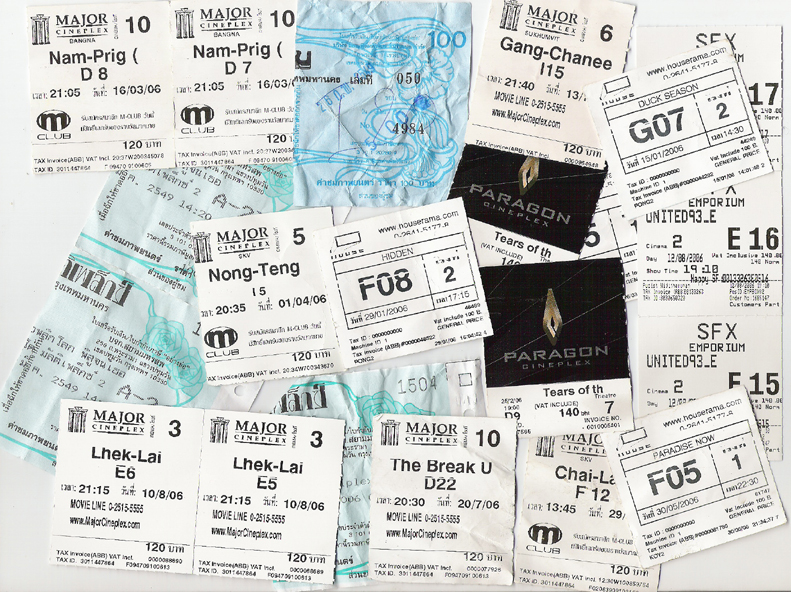
An assortment of ticket stubs from Bangkok cinemas, circa 2006.

Ticket prices range from around 70 baht to 160 baht, depending on the time of day, the day of the week, the location of the theater and the movie being screened. In Bangkok cinemas, the price for new-release films will generally be 140 to 160 baht.

Seating is assigned; audience members make their choice of seating on a computer screen at the box office. Online ticketing is available on theater-chain websites. Automated phone booking is available as well.

Before the film, the audience must stand for the "Royal Anthem", which is accompanied by a montage of images of King Vajiralongkorn.

Most theaters in Thailand keep the air conditioning very cold; patrons often bring a light sweater or jacket.

The EGV chain has "Gold Class" cinemas, which have smaller screening rooms fitted with reclining seats, blankets and pillows. Prices for a Gold Class show range from 300 baht to 500 baht. The Major Cineplex chain offers comparable "Emperor" class seating, while SF Cinema has "First Class" and "VIP" screenings and Major Hollywood has "Star" seats. Paragon Cineplex has "Ultra Screen" theaters. Some cinemas, including Major Cineplex, EGV and Major Hollywood, have sofa-style seating at the back of the auditoriums, intended for couples. Customers who purchase these types of seats may sit in a lounge before the show and may be provided with free drinks or popcorn. Food and drinks may also be ordered and will be served by theater staff as the movie is playing.

== Language and subtitling ==
In central Bangkok and cities with many tourists and foreign residents, such as Chiang Mai, Pattaya and Phuket, foreign films (including Hollywood releases) will have the original soundtrack (called "soundtrack") with Thai subtitles. Outside of tourism centers and in some suburban Bangkok cinemas, all the foreign films, including Hollywood films, will generally be dubbed into Thai language.

Films from other Asian countries, including China, Hong Kong, Japan and Korea, often play in Thai theaters, but the soundtracks will usually be dubbed into Thai. Exceptions to this will be found at the Apex chain theaters in Siam Square and at House cinema on Royal City Avenue.

Often, films from Hollywood, as well as films from European countries that feature languages other than English, will have only Thai subtitles.

For Thai films, most cinemas in tourism centers will have English subtitles. Exceptions for regional language (like Isan) in Thai film, such as Yam Yasothon (Thai: แหยม ยโสธร) and Panya Raenu (Thai: ปัญญา เรณู), which have only Thai subtitles.

== Film ratings ==
A motion picture rating system to replace the 1930 Film Code was passed by the National Legislative Assembly in 2007 and was implemented in 2010.

Under the 1930 Film Code, the Board of Censors reviewed all films to be shown in Thailand and made cuts or altered scenes that were deemed inappropriate. The board was made up of members of the Royal Thai Police and Ministry of Culture officials. Members of various interest groups, such as Buddhist monks, physicians or teachers, are sometimes consulted about whether certain films would offend them.

Traditionally, depictions of sex and nudity are dealt with most heavy-handedly, with scenes being cut, pixelated or obscured by petroleum jelly. Profanity and violence are generally left intact.

== Apex ==
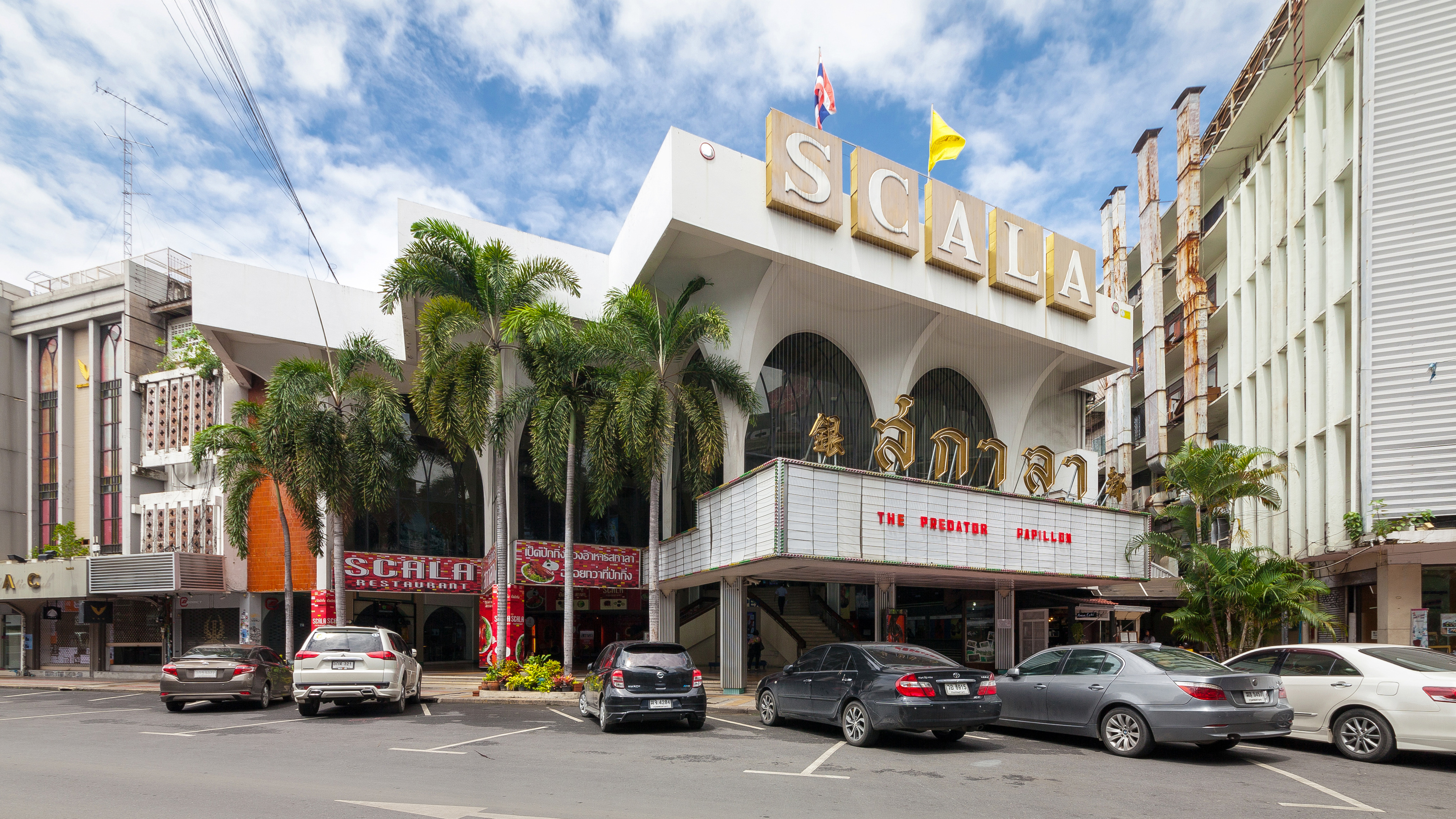
The historical landmark Scala Cinema of Siam Square, closed in 2020

The Apex Group of cinemas comprise the Lido, Scala and Siam theaters in Siam Square in Bangkok. The company is owned by the Tansacha family and is headed by Nanta Tansacha. The theaters were built in the late 1960s and have changed little since, making possible a retro movie-going experience that can't be found at the shopping-mall multiplexes. The theaters tend to not be as crowded as the other cinemas in central Bangkok, and it's usually possible to obtain the most-desired seating just minutes before showtime. The Apex cinemas not only show first-run Hollywood films, but also many art films, which is unique in Thailand, other than the House theater on Royal City Avenue. Among the events exclusive to the Apex is the annual Little Big Film Project, in which a series of foreign independent films are shown over the course of several weeks.

Cinema	Screens	Seats	Location	Remarks
Lido	3	675	Siam Square, Pathum Wan, opposite Siam Center	The Lido cinemas are an older multiplex dating back to the late 1960s. They often screen Japanese, Korean and other foreign films and offer both Thai and English subtitles. All seats are 100 baht. On May 31, 2018, the cinema held a farewell event for the original iteration of the multiplex before closing down for renovation and re-opened as Lido Connect on July 30, 2019. After re-opening, while Lido 2 and 3 were converted into concert and live event halls — only Lido 1 remains as a movie theater.
Scala	1	900	Siam Square, Pathum Wan, opposite Siam Discovery Center	The Scala Theatre was built in 1967. The screen is 21 meters wide and 8.7 meters tall. Ticket buyers point out what seats they desire on a paper chart in the ticket booth. Also in the lobby are hand-painted movie advertisements, which were commonplace in Thailand until the 1990s, when large-scale screen printing became available. First-run Hollywood features are usually featured at the Scala, with the films moving to the Lido cinemas in subsequent weeks. The Scala is occasionally booked for live shows and private functions. Tickets are 140 baht for normal seats (Row H-CC) and 160 baht for stadium-style seating at the rear of the auditorium (Row A-G). Scala switched their main projector from film to digital on February 27, 2013, with the film projector still available for special screenings of films in 35mm movie film. The Scala Cinema closed on 5 July 2020, with its last screening being the film, Cinema Paradiso.
Siam	1	832	Siam Square, Pathum Wan, opposite Siam Paragon	Siam Theatre was burnt down during the political unrest in Bangkok on 19 May 2010.

== Coliseum Cineplex ==
Coliseum Cineplex is a chain of movie theaters in Southern Thailand.

Cinema	Screens	Seats	Location	Remarks
Coliseum Cineplex	6		Paradise Shopping Plaza, Phuket City	
Coliseum Cineplex	3		Phatthalung	
Coliseum Cineplex	4		Yala	Opened 25 January 2006.

== Major Cineplex ==
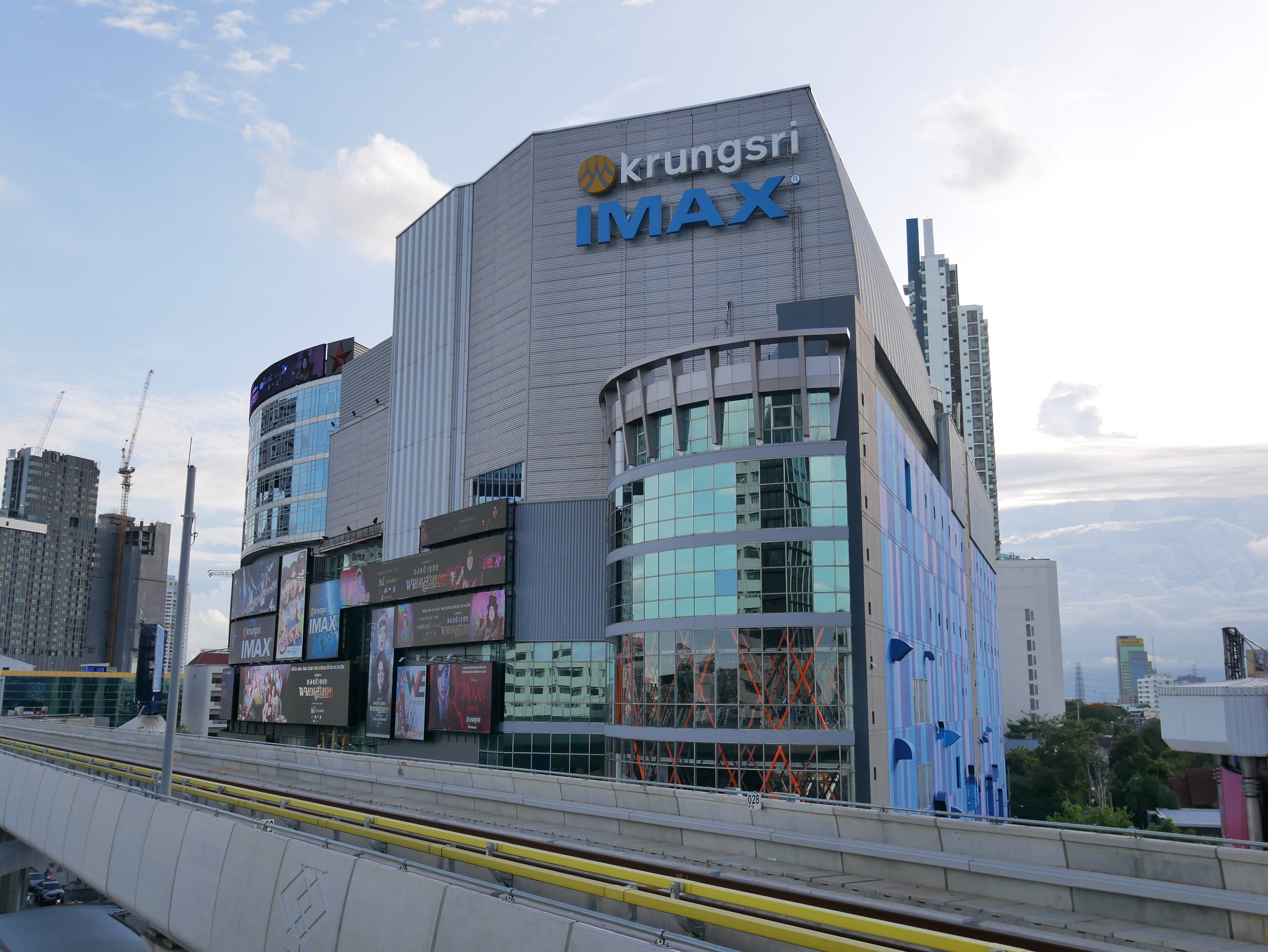
Major Ratchayothin

Major Cineplex combined with the EGV chain, is the largest operator of cinemas in Thailand. Its operations are concentrated in Bangkok. Major Cineplex's cinemas are divided into five brands which are Major, Major Cineplex, Major Cinema, EGV, Paragon Cineplex, Quartier CineArt, ICON Cineconic and Esplanade Cineplex.

1. Current Branches

=== Major ===
In April 2025, Major Cineplex decided to use the name "Major" as the sole brand to rebrand all branches of Major Cineplex, Major Cinema and EGV to use the same name.

==== In Bangkok district ====
Cinema	Screens	Seats	Location	Remarks
Major Bangkae	10	1858	Seacon Bangkae, Petchkasem Road, Bang Khae, Bangkok (Old Future Park Bangkhae)	The first multiplex theater in Thailand. Opened in June 1994 under EGV Bangkae 10 brand, built situated in the former Future Park Bangkae mall, before taken over by Seacon Development. In August 2010, it was temporarily closed for big renovation of two years and is opened in September 2012 as Grand EGV brand with some major upgrading. Later in 2024, it is received a major renovation based in the same concept as Sriracha Cineplex adopted earlier, which was set by changed the name at first to Bangkae Cineplex and later changed the name to Major Bangkae after a lot of speculations, an GLS Cinema, and Kids Cinema.
Major Cineplex Bang Kadi	2		Lotus's Bang Kadi, Pathumthani	Opened in February 2021.
Major Cineplex Bang Kapi	10	2205	Lotus's Bang Kapi, Lat Phrao Road, Bangkok	Opened in October 2002, an GLS Cinema.
Major Cineplex Bang Na	10	1954	Central Bangna, Bangkok	Opened in July 2002, on the sixth floor of a Central Group shopping mall, adjacent to restaurants, shops and the Pororo Aquapark Bangkok water amusement park, an VIP Cinema 1 Screen.
Major Cineplex Bangpakok	3	777	Lotus's Bang Pakok, Bangkok	Opened in December 2018.
Major Cineplex Bangsue	6	1410	Gateway at Bangsue Bang Pho, Bangkok	Opened in November 2018.
Major Cineplex Bang Yai	6	1532	Lotus's Bang Yai, Nonthaburi (Old Plus Mall)	Opened in August 2014.
Major Cineplex Chaengwattana	5	827	Charn at The Avenue Chaengwattana, Chaengwattana Road, Bangkok	Opened in April 2024.
Major Cineplex Fashion Island	7	1495	Fashion Island Ram Inthra Road, Khan Na Yao, Bangkok	Opened in June 1995 as EGV brand.
Major Future Park	10	1565	Future Park Rangsit, Pathumthani	Opened in June 1995 as EGV brand, an VIP Cinema 1 Screen, and Kids Cinema.
Major Cineplex Navanakorn	4	1187	Lotus's Navanakhon, Khlong Luang, Pathumthani	Opened in September 2008.
Major Cineplex Pathumtani	5		Big C Pathumthani	Opened in July 2017.
Major Cineplex Phetchakasem	6	1690	Phetkasem Power Center Phetkasem Road, Bangkok	Opened in September 2005.
Major Central Pinklao	7	1053	Central Pinklao, Borommaratchachonnani Road, Bangkok Noi, Bangkok	Opened in October 1995 as EGV brand, formerly an Major Cineplex, an IMAX with Laser was opened here in April 2025, and Kids Cinema.
Major Cineplex Pinklao	10	2094	Borommaratchachonnani Road, Bang Phlat, Bangkok	The first Major Cineplex complex, it is opened in 1995, has bowling alley. Opposite Central Pinklao, Bangkok Noi.
Major Cinema Ratchaphruek	4	680	Robinson Lifestyle Ratchaphruek, Nonthaburi	Opened in November 2022.
Major Cineplex Ratchayothin	15	3524	Phahonyothin Road, Lat Yao, Chatuchak, Bangkok	The former flagship branch of the Major Cineplex chain was opened in November 1998. It had Thailand's first IMAX theater until the IMAX operation was moved to Paragon Cineplex in 2006. The shopping mall is anchored by the cineplex, with shops, restaurants, a bowling alley, karaoke and a fitness center. An IMAX Digital Theatre was opened here in 2010. The cinema has now been upgraded to IMAX with Laser, Dolby Atmos Cinema, GLS Cinema, and Kids Cinema.
Major Cineplex Central Rama 2	9	1622	Central Rama 2, Bangkok	Opened in December 2002, an GLS Cinema.
Major Cineplex Lotus's Rama 2	3	765	Lotus's Rama 2, Bangkok	Opened in August 2019.
Major Cineplex Rama 3	9	2437	Central Rama 3, Bangkok	A former United Artists multiplex, Major Cineplex took it over and remodeled it in May 2002, an VIP Cinema 1 Screen, and Kids Cinema.
Major Cineplex Rangsit	16	3148	Phahonyothin Road, Rangsit, Pathum Thani	Opened in March 2002, The first megaplex in Asia, has bowling alley, an IMAX With Laser was opened here in November 2026, VIP Cinema 2 Screens, and Kids Cinema.
Major Cineplex Rangsit-Klong 6	4	1020	Big C Thanyaburi, Pathumthani	Opened in August 2008.
Major Cineplex Robinson Samut Prakan	5	1165	Robinson Samut Prakan	Opened in October 2014.
Major Cineplex Lotus's Mall Samut Prakan	2	365	Makro x Lotus's Mall Samut Prakan, Sai Luat Road, Samut Prakan	Opened in July 2022.
Major Cinema Samut Prakan	2	348	Big C Place Samut Prakan	Opened in November 2016 as EGV brand, formerly as Thana Cineplex.
Major Cineplex Samrong	8	1732	Imperial World Samrong, Sukhumvit Road, Samut Prakan	Opened in October 2002 as EGV brand.
Major Cineplex Samsen	6	1475	Supreme Complex Shopping Mall, Samsen Road, Bangkok	Opened in September 2010.
Major Cineplex Srinakarin	5	1192	Lotus's, Srinakarin Road, Samut Prakan (Old Plus Mall)	Opened in November 2008.
Major Cineplex Sukhumvit	8	1586	Sukhumvit Soi 61, Watthana, Bangkok	Opened in December 1997 as shopping center anchored by the movie theater with restaurants, shops, bowling alley and karaoke, the Sukhumvit branch sometimes has late shows. It is near the Skytrain's Ekamai station, opposite the Eastern Bus Terminal, an Kids Cinema.
Major Cineplex Suksawat	4		Big C Suksawat, Lat Luang, Phla Pradaeng, Samut Prakan	Opened in November 2016.
Major Cineplex Suvarnabhumi	5	876	Robinson Suvarnabhumi, Lad Krabang, Bangkok	Opened in November 2019, an Kids Cinema.
Major Cineplex Tiwanon	3	608	Big C Tiwanon, Nonthaburi	Opened in August 2023, Moved from Major Cineplex River Plaza Nonthaburi.

==== In Province district ====
Cinema	Screens	Seats	Location	Remarks
Major Cineplex Amata Nakorn	5	1310	Lotus's Amata Nakorn, Chonburi (Old Plus Mall)	Opened in October 2009.
Major Cineplex Amnat Charoen	2	512	Big C Place, Amnat Charoen	Opened in November 2025.
Major Cineplex Ang Thong	2		Lotus's Ang Thong	Opened in January 2019.
Major Cineplex Ayutthaya	4	1313	Big C Ayutthaya	Opened in February 2008.
Major Cinema Ban Dung	1	204	Big C Ban Dung, Udon Thani	Opened in November 2017 as EGV Brand.
Major Cineplex Ban Phai	2	546	Big C Ban Phai, Khon Kaen	Opened in November 2016.
Major Cineplex Ban Pong	5	1442	Lotus's Ban Pong, Ratchaburi	Opened in September 2008.
Major Cineplex Ban Suan	2		Lotus's Ban Suan, Chonburi	Opened in January 2019.
Major Cinema Bowin	3		Big C Bowin, Rayong	Opened in November 2021.
Major Cineplex Buriram	5		Big C Buriram	Opened in September 2016.
Major Cineplex Chachoengsao	5	1711	Big C Place Chachoengsao	Opened in July 2004, part of complex anchored by Big C.
Major Cineplex Chai Nat	2		Makro x Lotus's Mall Chai Nat	Opened in July 2026.
Major Cineplex Chaiyaphum	3		Robinson Chaiyaphum	Opened in December 2018.
Major Cinema Chalong	3		Robinson Chalong Phuket	Opened in September 2023.
Major Cineplex Chana	2		Lotus's Chana, Songkhla	Opened in November 2016.
Major Cineplex Chanthaburi	5		Big C Chanthaburi	Opened in December 2011.
Major Cineplex Central Chiangmai Airport	6		Central Chiangmai Airport (Old Tantraphan Airport Plaza)	Opened in March 2001, an Kids Cinema.
Major Cineplex Central Chiangmai	10		Central Chiangmai (Central Festival)	Opened in December 2013, an VIP Cinema 1 Screen, IMAX with Laser seats have 420, GLS Cinema, and Kids Cinema.
Major Cineplex Central Chiangrai	5	1347	Central Chiangrai	Opened in March 2011.
Major Cineplex Big C Chiang Rai 2	4		Big C Chiang Rai 2	Opened in December 2018.
Major Cineplex Lotus's Chiang Rai	2		Lotus's Chiang Rai	Opened in December 2026.
Major Cineplex Chom Thong	1	207	Lotus's Chom Thong, Chiang Mai	Opened in January 2019, part of complex anchored by Makro Chom Thong
Major Cineplex Chonburi	4	1063	Big C Chonburi	Opened in October 2007.
Major Cineplex Chumphon	5		Ocean Shopping Mall Chumphon	Opened in October 2018.
Major Cineplex Det Udom	2		Lotus's Det Udom, Ubon Rachathani	Opened in May 2019
Major Cinema Hatyai	2		Lotus's Hatyai 1, Songkhla	Opened in December 2021.
Major Cineplex Hua Hin	4	1404	Hua Hin Market Village, Prachuap Khiri Khan	Opened in February 2006, large-scale shopping mall has a Lotus's and many stores. Does not often show English-soundtrack films.
Major Cineplex Big C Kamphaeng Phet	4	1008	Big C Kamphaeng Phet	Opened in December 2010.
Major Cineplex Robinson Kamphaeng Phet	4		Robinson Kamphaeng Phet	Opened in December 2017.
Major Cineplex Kamphaeng Saen	2		Lotus's Kamphaeng Saen, Nakhon Pathom	Opened in July 2018.
Major Cineplex Kanchanaburi	4		TMK Park Kanchanaburi	Opened in December 2018.
Major Cineplex Khok Samrong	2		Lotus's, Khok Samrong, Lopburi	Opened in August 2018.
Major Cinema Lotus's Khon Kaen 2	5	1206	Lotus's Khon Kaen 2	Opened in December 2011 as EGV brand for the first time since 2005 and is the first EGV location to take new brand place following renovation of entire hypermarket in January 2022.
Major Khonkaen Campus	4		Central Khonkaen Campus	Opened in May 2026, an GLS Cinema, and Kids Cinema.
Major Cineplex Lotus's Khon Kaen 1	5	1041	Lotus's Khon Kaen 1 (CP Tower)	Opened in October 2015.
Major Cineplex Fairy Plaza Khon Kaen	4	552	Fairy Plaza, Khon Kaen	Opened in December 2023, formerly as Fairy Cineplex.
EGV Kham Ta Kla	1		Big C Kham Ta Kla, Sakon Nakhon	Opened in March 2018.
Major Cineplex Klaeng	4		Lotus's Klaeng, Rayong	Opened in October 2013.
Major Cineplex Krabi	4	1134	Lotus's Krabi	Opened in December 2007.
Major Cineplex Lat Yao	1		Big C Lat Yao, Nakhon Sawan	Opened in October 2018.
Major Cineplex Lampang	4		Big C Lampang	Opened in October 2016, formerly as Thana Cineplex.
Major Cineplex Lamphun	4		Chaemfah Lamphun	Opened in December 2016.
EGV Lamphun	3		Big C Lamphun	Opened in December 2016.
Major Cineplex Lopburi	5		Big C Lopburi	Opened in February 2016, formerly as Thana Cineplex.
EGV Mae Sot	4		Lotus's, Mae Sot, Tak	Opened in January 2013.
Major Cineplex Mahachai	5		Big C Mahachai, Samut Sakhon	Opened in April 2010.
Major Cinema Mahachai	2		Big C Mahachai 2, Samut Sakhon	Opened in September 2020.
Major Cineplex Map Ta Phut	2		Lotus's Map Ta Phut, Rayong	Opened in December 2018.
Major Cineplex Mueang Phon	2	316	Lotus's Mueang Phon, Phon, Khon Kaen	Opened in December 2018.
Major Cineplex Mukdahan	4	1090	Robinson Mukdahan	Opened in December 2014.
Major Cineplex Na Di	3	669	Lotus's Na Di, Udon Thani	Opened in September 2016.
Major Cinema Nakhon Nayok	2		Lotus's Nakhon Nayok	Opened in February 2025.
Major Cineplex Nakhon Ratchasima	4		Big C Nakhon Ratchasima	Opened in June 2017.
Major Cineplex V-Square Nakhon Sawan	5	1138	V-Square Nakhon Sawan	Opened in June 2003.
Major Cineplex Lotus's Mall Nakhon Sawan	4		Makro x Lotus's Mall Nakhon Sawan (Khao Khad)	Opened in February 2013.
Major Cineplex Nakhon Si Thammarat	4		Sahathai Nakhon Si Thammarat	Opened in December 2012.
Major Cinema Nakhon Si Thammarat	4		Lotus's Nakhon Si Thammarat	Opened in April 2015 as EGV brand.
EGV Num Yuen	1		Big C Num Yuen, Ubon Rachathani	Opened in September 2017.
Major Cinieplex Nan	2		Big C Nan	Opened in May 2015.
EGV Nong Bua	1		Big C Nong Bua, Nakhon Sawan Province	Opened in July 2018.
Major Cineplex Nong Bua Lamphu	4	1050	Lotus's Nong Bua Lamphu	Opened in April 2013.
Major Cineplex Nong Khai	2		Asawann Nong Khai 2 (Big C Nong Khai)	Opened in October 2018.
Major Cineplex Nong Ki	1		Big C Nong Ki, Buriram	Opened in August 2018.
Major Cinema Omyai	5	1224	Big C Place Omyai, Nakhon Pathom	Opened in April 2005 as EGV brand.
Major Cinema Pak Chong	3		Big C Pak Chong, Nakhon Ratchasima	Opened in November 2019.
Major Cineplex Pattani	3		Big C Pattani	Opened in December 2024.
Major Cineplex Pattaya	8	1748	The Avenue Pattaya, Second Road, Pattaya	Opened in August 2007, Stand-alone branch.
Major Cinema Phrae	3		Mark Four Plaza Phrae	Opened in January 2020, formerly as Thana Cineplex.
Major Cineplex Phang Khon	1		Big C Phang Khon, Sakon Nakhon	Opened in March 2018.
Major Cineplex Phang Nga	3		Big C Phang Nga	Opened in December 2014.
Major Cineplex Phatthalung	3		Lotus's Phatthalung	Opened in February 2018.
Major Cineplex Phayakkhaphum Phisai	2		Lotus's Phayakkhaphum Phisai, Mahasarakham	Opened in November 2016.
Major Cineplex Phayao	3		Charoenphan Department Store Phayao	Opened in March 2019.
Major Cinema Phayao	2		Lotus's Phayao	Opened in December 2021.
Major Cineplex Phetchaburi	5		Robinson Phetchaburi	Opened in May 2017.
Major Cineplex Phetchabun	4	1144	Lotus's Phetchabun	Opened in February 2008.
Major Cineplex Phibun Mangsahan	2		Lotus's Phibun Mangsahan, Ubon Rachathani	Opened in August 2018.
Major Cineplex Lotus's Phichit	2		Lotus's Phichit	Opened in December 2017.
Major Cineplex Tops Plaza Phichit	3		Tops Plaza Phichit	Opened in December 2017.
EGV Phimai	2		Lotus's Phimai, Nakhon Ratchasima Province	Opened in October 2016.
Major Cineplex Lotus's Phitsanulok	4	1067	Lotus's Phitsanulok	Opened in September 2006.
Major Cineplex Central Phitsanulok	5		Central Phitsanulok	Opened in Octoter 2011.
Major Cineplex Prachuap Khiri Khan	2		Lotus's Prachuap Khiri Khan	Opened in December 2016.
Major Cineplex Ranong	3		Big C Ranong	Opened in May 2017.
Major Cineplex Big C Ratchaburi	4		Big C Ratchaburi	Opened in March 2016.
Major Cineplex Lotus's Ratchaburi	2		Lotus's Ratchaburi	Opened in October 2018.
Major Cineplex Rayong	8		Central Rayong	Opened in May 2015, an Kids Cinema.
Major Cineplex Big C Roi Et	5		Big C Roi Et	Opened in January 2013.
Major Cineplex Robinson Roi Et	4		Robinson Roi Et	Opened in October 2014.
Major Cineplex Sakon Nakhon	4		Robinson Sakon Nakhon	Opened in November 2013.
Major Cineplex Salaya	5	1003	Lotus's Salaya, Nakhon Pathom	Opened in January 2008.
Major Cineplex Sam Phran	2		Lotus's Sam Phran, Nakhon Pathom	Opened in April 2017.
Major Cineplex Lotus's Samui	3	918	Lotus's Ko Samui, Surat Thani	Opened in May 2006.
Major Cineplex Central Samui	3		Central Samui, Surat Thani	Opened in March 2014.
Major Cineplex Saraburi	5		Robinson Saraburi	Opened in November 2013.
Major Cinema Lotus's Saraburi	2		Lotus's Saraburi	Opened in December 2019.
Major Cinema Big C Place Saraburi	4		Big C Place Saraburi	Opened in November 2023.
Major Cineplex Satun	3		Lotus's Satun	Opened in May 2016.
Major Cineplex Sattahip	3		Big C Sattahip, Chonburi	Opened in April 2018.
Major Cineplex Sichon	2		Big C Market Sichon, Nakhon Si Thammarat	Opened in January 2017.
Major Cineplex Singburi	3		Chaisaeng Department Store Singburi	Opened in October 2018.
Major Cinema Si Racha	4	1350	Pacific Park Si Racha Chonburi Province	Opened in August 1997 as EGV brand.
Major Cinema Songkhla	5		Lotus's Songkhla	Opened in January 2014 as EGV Brand.
Major Cineplex Sisaket	2		Lotus's Sisaket	Opened in September 2018.
Major Cineplex Sri Maha Phot	2		Big C Si Maha Phot, Prachinburi	Opened in May 2014.
Major Cineplex Sukhothai	2		Big C Sukhothai	Opened in February 2018.
Major Cineplex Big C Suphanburi	4		Big C Suphanburi	Opened in September 2013.
Major Cineplex Lotus's Suphanburi	4		Lotus's Suphanburi	Opened in February 2014.
Major Cineplex Surat Thani	7		Sahathai Garden Plaza Surat Thani	Opened in July 2015.
EGV Surat Thani	6		Lotus's Surat Thani Province	Opened in August 2015.
Major Cineplex Surin	4		Surin Plaza, Surin	Opened in March 2021, formerly as Surin Cineplex.
Major Cineplex Suwannaphum	1		Big C Suwannaphum, Roi Et	Opened in December 2017.
EGV Tha Tako	1		Big C Tha Tako, Nakhon Sawan	Opened in November 2017.
Major Cinema Tha Thong	3		Lotus's Tha Thong, Phitsanulok	Opened in September 2017 as EGV brand.
Major Cineplex Thung Song	3		Sahathai Thung Song, Nakhon Si Thammarat	Opened in February 2018.
Major Cineplex Ubon Ratchathani	7		Central Ubon	Opened in April 2013.
Major Cineplex Central Udon	8	2117	Central Udon (Old Charoensri Complex)	Opened in December 2003, formerly as Charoensri Cineplex, an Kids Cinema.
Major Cineplex Lotus's Plus Udon	3	604	Lotus's Plus Udon (Rangsina)	Opened in June 2026.
EGV Udon Thani	4	844	Big C Place Udon Thani (Santaphon)	Opened in February 2016 as EGV brand.
Major Cineplex; U Thong	2		Lotus's U Thong, Suphanburi	Opened in June 2018
Major Cineplex Uttaradit	3		Sripong Park Uttaradit	Opened in March 2018.
EGV Uttaradit	2		Lotus's Uttaradit	Opened in October 2018.
Major Cineplex Wichian Buri	1		Big C Wichian Buri, Phetchabun	Opened in December 2017.
Major Cinema Yala	3		Big C Yala	Opened in July 2024.
Major Cineplex Yasothon	2		Lotus's Yasothon	Opened in September 2017.

=== Paragon Cineplex ===
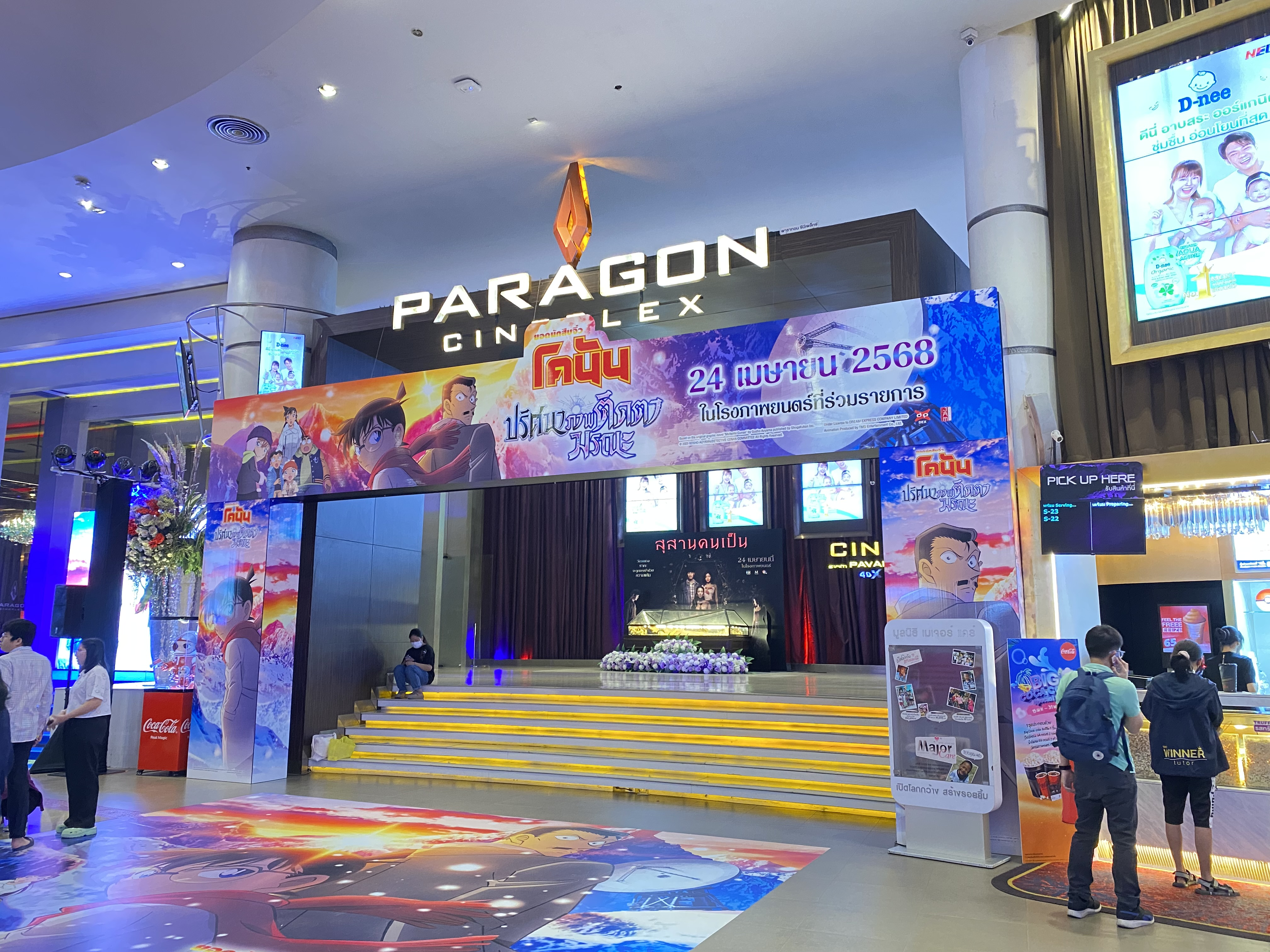
Paragon Cineplex

Paragon Cineplex is located in the Siam Paragon shopping mall, and is operated by the Major Cineplex Group.

Cinema	Screens	Seats	Location	Remarks
Krungsri IMAX	1	454	Siam Paragon, Pathum Wan, Bangkok	Opened June 2006; moved from former location at Major Ratchayothin. It's also the only IMAX theater in the Southeast Asia region with a functional IMAX 70mm film projector.
Paragon Cineplex	13	3732	Siam Paragon, Pathum Wan, Bangkok	Opened in early 2006 on the fifth floor of the shopping mall, the cineplex includes the 4DX Theatre. the ScreenX Theatre. the Siam Pavalai, a 1,200-seat theater. as well as Enigma, a members-only cinema and lounge. with Blu-O bowling.

=== Esplanade Cineplex ===
Esplanade Cineplex is operated by the Major Cineplex Group.

Cinema	Screens	Seats	Location	Remarks
Esplanade Cineplex Ratchada	12	2457	The Esplanade Ratchada, Ratchadaphisek Road, Din Daeng, Bangkok	A flagship branch for the Major Cineplex chain opened in December 2006. It includes a 22-lane bowling alley, an ice-skating rink, shops and restaurants. Including the GLS Theatre, Arte Cinema Theatre, Dolby Vision+Atmos Theatre and VIP Cinema Theatre. It is near the MRT's Thailand Cultural Centre station.
IMAX With Laser	1	496	Esplanade Cineplex Ngamwonwan-Khaerai, Rattanathibet Road, Nonthaburi	Opened in November 2023, Full IMAX ratio at 1:90:1.
Esplanade Cineplex Ngamwonwan-Khaerai	15	3566	Rattanathibet Road, Nonthaburi	Opened in December 2009, The second branch in the Esplanade Cineplex's chain. It includes a 22-lane bowling alley,15 karaoke rooms, an ice-skating rink 2-times larger than Rachadaphisek branch, 7,435 sq.m. retail space.Including the Kids Cinema Theatre and VIP Cinema Theatre.

=== Mega Cineplex ===
Mega Cineplex is located in the Mega Bangna shopping mall, and is operated by the Major Cineplex Group.

Cinema	Screens	Seats	Location	Remarks
Coca-Cola present IMAX with Laser	1	484	Central Mega Bangna, Samut Prakan	Opened in December 2022, Full IMAX ratio at 1:90:1.
Mega Cineplex	14	2734	Central Mega Bangna, Samut Prakan	14 Digital cinema. (VietjetAir.com Cinema 1 Screen, Real Asset Ultimate Cinema 1 Screen, 4DX with Laser 1 Screen, ScreenX 1 Screen, Pallysocks Kids Cinema 1 Screen, LG Miraclass LED Cinema 1 Screen and Laserplex 8 Screens.) with Blu-O bowling and karaoke and Sub-Zero ice skate rink. Opened in May 2012.

=== Hatyai Cineplex ===
Hatyai Cineplex is located in the Central Hatyai shopping mall, and is operated by the Major Cineplex Group.

Cinema	Screens	Seats	Location	Remarks
Hatyai Cineplex	10	2329	Central Hatyai, Songkla	Opened in December 2013 on the fifth floor of the shopping mall, the cineplex includes luxury "VIP Cinema" cinemas, with reclining seats, and GLS Theater used to be IMAX theater.

=== Quartier CineArt ===
Quartier CineArt is located in the EmQuartier (Bangkok) shopping mall, and is operated by the Major Cineplex Group.

Cinema	Screens	Seats	Location	Remarks
IMAX With Laser	1	386	EmQuartier, Phrom Phong, Bangkok	Opened in April 2015, Full IMAX ratio at 1.90:1.
Quartier CineArt	7	976	EmQuartier, Phrom Phong, Bangkok	Opened in April 2015 on the fourth floor of the shopping mall, the cineplex includes the AEON Theater @ Quartier the Thailand first and luxury cinema screened by laser projector system. The formally named SCB First Screen is the fourth location of Major Cineplex Dolby Atmos theater with RealD XL screening system. And Kids Cinema.

=== WestGate Cineplex ===
WestGate Cineplex is located in the Central Westgate shopping mall, and is operated by the Major Cineplex Group.

Cinema	Screens	Seats	Location	Remarks
IMAX With Laser	1	402	Central WestGate, Bang Yai, Nonthaburi	Opened in August 2015, Full IMAX ratio at 1:90:1.
WestGate Cineplex	11	1849	Central WestGate, Bang Yai, Nonthaburi	Opened in August 2015 on the fourth–fifth floor of the shopping mall, the cineplex includes the VIP Cinema, 3D Sound Cinema, theater with RealD 3D screening system, Kids Cinema and 8 digital cinema halls.

=== ICON Cineconic ===
ICON Cineconic is located in the Iconsiam Bangkok shopping mall, and is operated by the Major Cineplex Group.

Cinema	Screens	Seats	Location	Remarks
Iconic IMAX With Laser	1	351	Iconsiam Bangkok	Opened in November 2018, The Iconic IMAX Theater-the first IMAX with Laser theater in Thailand that equipped by IMAX-Barco 2nd generation laser projector (the Commercial Laser; CoLa) and 12.1 channel IMAX nXos sound system. Full IMAX ratio at 1:90:1.
ICON Cineconic	8	1105	Iconsiam Bangkok	Opened in November 2018 on the sixth–eighth floor of the shopping mall, the cineplex includes the Premier Cinema, Cineconic Kids Cinema, Cineconic Living Cinema-a cinema-themed with living room concept that provide for group rental or event rental first, the Iconic 4DX theater, Dolby Atmos theater, and 3 digital cinemas that equipped with laser projection system.

=== One Ultra Screens ===
One Ultra Screens is located in the Parade at One Bangkok shopping mall and is operated by the Major Cineplex Group since March 2026.

Cinema	Screens	Seats	Location	Remarks
One Ultra Screens	6	929	Pathum Wan (Lumpini), Bangkok	6 Digital cinema. (VIP Cinema 1 Screen, Kids Cinema 1 Screen and Laserplex 4 Screens.) Located at Parade zone, One Bangkok. An exclusive cinema club with premium service under Exclusive Cinema Club concept.

=== Promenade Cineplex ===
Located in The Promenade shopping mall in Ramintra, Bangkok. Designed in Classical theme. Opened in August 2015.

- Digital Cinema 2 Screens.
- Laserplex 4 Screens.
- GLS 1 Screens.
- Kids Cinema 1 Screens.

=== Eastville Cineplex ===
Located in Central Eastville shopping mall in Bangkok. Designed in English Garden cinema concept and provide the first eco-cineplex that belong to "Green Ville" concepts of shopping mall. Opened in November 2015.

- Laserplex 7 Screens.
- VIP Cinema 1 Screens.
- 3D Sound 1 Screens.
- Kids Cinema 1 Screens.

=== Diana Cineplex ===
Located in Diana shopping mall in Hat Yai, Songkhla. Designed in Movie Relaxation theme. Opened in December 2015. Formerly an Coliseum Cineplex.

- Digital Cinema 5 Screens.

=== Ayutthaya City Park Cineplex ===
Located in Ayutthaya City Park shopping mall in Phra Nakhon Si Ayutthaya. Designed in Movie Relaxation theme. Opened in May 2016. Formerly an Thana Cineplex.

- Digital Cinema 4 Screens.
- Laserplex 2 Screens.

=== Blúport Cineplex ===
Located in Blúport shopping mall in Huahin, Prachuap Khiri Khan. Designed in Resort theme belong to shopping mall theme. Opened in October 2016.

- Digital Cinema 6 Screens.

=== Korat Cineplex ===
Located in The Mall Korat shopping mall in Nakhon Ratchasima. Designed in Digital Edge theme belong to WestGate Cineplex. Opened in August 2000 as Grand EGV Brand.

- Laserplex 8 Screens.
- GLS 1 Screens.
- Kids Cinema 1 Screens.

=== Seacon Cineplex ===
Located in Seacon Square shopping mall in Srinakarin, Bangkok. Designed in Movie Relaxation theme. Opened in September 1997 as Grand EGV Band.

- Digital Cinema 6 Screens.
- Laserplex 2 Screens.

=== Si Racha Cineplex ===
Located in Central Si Racha shopping mall in Si Racha, Chonburi. Designed in Digital Oasis theme. Opened in October 2021.

- Digital Cinema 3 Screens.
- Laserplex 2 Screens.

=== Chanthaburi Cineplex ===
Located in Central Chanthaburi shopping mall in Chanthaburi. Designed in Digital Oasis theme. Opened in May 2022.

- Digital Cinema 3 Screens.
- Laserplex 2 Screens.

=== Westville Cineplex ===
Located in Central Westville shopping mall in Nonthaburi. It is to be first cinema hall that designed for low carbon and sustainability design. All materials used for decorate are recycled materials. Opened in November 2023.

- Laserplex 2 Screens.
- VIP Cinema 1 Screens.
- Pramy Pet Cinema 1 Screens.
- Kids Cinema 1 Screens.

=== Bangkapi Cineplex ===
Located in The Mall Lifestore Bangkapi shopping mall in Bangkapi, Bangkok. Opened in November 2023. It was once garage of SF Cinema with major renovation surround remnant of old SF inside theaters except to newly IMAX Laser and is now opened with 6 cinemas from previously 9 cinemas portion.

- Laserplex 6 Screens.
- Coca-Cola presents IMAX with Laser 1 Screens.
- Kids Cinema 1 Screens.

=== Nakhon Pathom Cineplex ===
Located in Central Nakhon Pathom shopping mall in Nakhon Pathom. Opened in March 2024.

- Digital Cinema 2 Screens.
- Laserplex 2 Screens.
- Kids Cinema 1 Screens.

== Major Hollywood ==
Major Hollywood is a small chain of cinemas in suburban Bangkok.

Cinema	Screens	Seats	Location	Remarks
Major Hollywood Chaeng Watthana	10	1799	Chaeng Watthana Road, Pak Kret, Nonthaburi	Opened in 2000 as replacement of SaveCo Superstore. There are 3 types of auditoriums. First, 8 Standard auditoriums with total 1713 seats. Second, 1 auditorium named Major Hollywood's "Sweet" cinemas are fitted with couches and are designed for couples provided only 56 seats. Third, 1 auditorium named Major Hollywood's "Star" cinemas are small screening rooms fitted with thickly padded reclining seats, with tableside food-and-beverage service provided only 30 v.i.p. seats.There are also bowling alley and karaoke rooms.
Major Hollywood Ramkhamhaeng	10		Ramkhamhaeng Road, Bang Kapi, opposite Ramkhamhaeng University	Opened in 2007 as replacement of Welco Department Store. Three-story complex has a shopping arcade, snack shops, 18-lane bowling alley and karaoke facilities. There are also "Sweet" and "Star" VIP auditoriums. All standard auditoriums has leg-space up to 1.5 meter with new style comfortable seat.
U Hollywood	N/A		Phahonyothin Rd. opposite Central Ladprao Shopping Mall. 6th floor on Union Mall Shopping Complex.	The world class eco-cinema concept opening in 14 Jan 2012 Thailand Children's Day.

== MVP ==
MVP is a chain of small cinemas based in Northeastern Thailand.

Cinema	Screens	Seats	Location	Remarks
MVP Buriram	5		Taweekit Super center Buriram	Formerly as TTF Multiplex, It has one Dolby Atmos Cinema.
MVP Kalasin	3		Big C Kalasin	Opened in 2013.
MVP Loei	3		Big C Loei	
MVP Sisaket	4		Big C Sisaket	

== SF Group ==
=== SF Cinema ===
SF Cinema is one of the brand names of SF Group. SF Cinema, dubbed SFC is targeted at middle-class families and teenagers. Its location is designed under the theme of Orange and White in relation to its logo and corporate identity system.

Cinema	Screens	Seats	Location	Remarks
SF Cinema Amata Nakorn	5	860	Robinson Amata Nakhon Chonburi	Opened 27 June 2018.
SF Cinema Asoke	8	1507	Terminal 21 Asoke, Khlong Toei Nuea, Bangkok	Opened in October 2011
SF Cinema Ayutthaya	5	897	Central Ayutthaya	Opened 30 November 2021.
SF Cinema Banchang	3	507	Robinson Banchang, Rayong	Opened 3 March 2022.
SF Cinema Bang Khae	8	1850	The Mall Lifestore Bang Khae, Phetkasem Road, Bangkok	Formerly as APEX cinema chain, Opened in August 2001 in suburban shopping center under the concept "Movie Fantasy".
SF Cinema Bang Phli	6	1072	Big C Place Bang Phli, Samut Prakan	Formerly as UMG, Opened 24 March 2016.
SF Cinema Bangsaen	4	929	Laemtong Shopping Center Bangsaen Chonburi	Renovated from SF Multiplex in November 2009.
SF Cinema Bowin	3	665	Robinson Bowin, Siracha, Chonburi	Opened 1 June 2020.
SF Cinema Buriram	5	868	Robinson Buriram	Opened 29 July 2015.
SF Cinema Chachoengsao	6	1421	Robinson Chachoengsao	Opened 12 September 2014.
SF Cinema Chanthaburi	4	890	Robinson Chanthaburi	Renovated from SF Multiplex in 2008.
SF Cinema Chonburi	7	1774	Central Chonburi	Opened on 29 May 2009.
SF Cinema Chumphon	3	549	Lotus's Chumphon	Opened 10 October 2019.
SF Cinema Jungceylon	5	1425	Jungceylon Shopping Complex, Patong, Phuket	Oriental-themed entertainment complex and shopping mall. Opened in October 2007.
SF Cinema Kanchanaburi	4	962	Robinson Kanchanaburi	Opened 28 February 2013.
SF Cinema Khon Kaen	8	1733	Central Khonkaen (Central Plaza)	Opened 3 December 2009. It has one Zigma Cinestadium cinema.
SF Cinema Big C Krabi	4	880	Big C Krabi	Opened 21 October 2021.
SF Cinema Central Krabi	3	665	Central Krabi	Opened 24 October 2025.
SF Cinema Lampang	4	965	Central Lampang	Opened 30 November 2012.
SF Cinema Laemchabang	4	1100	Harbor Mall Shopping Center, Laemchabang, Siracha, Chonburi	Renovated from SF Multiplex in March 2009.
SF Cinema Lopburi	5	967	Robinson Lopburi	Opened 16 December 2016.
SF Cinema Mae Sot	4	832	Robinson Mae Sot, Tak	Opened 18 December 2015.
SF Cinema Mahachai	6	1353	Central Mahachai	Opened 23 November 2017.
SF Cinema Maha Sarakham	5	1456	Sermthai Complex Maha Sarakham	Opened 21 December 2012.
SF Cinema MBK	8	1519	MBK Center, Pathum Wan, Bangkok	The company's first multiplex branch, opened in April 1999 under the theme "Movie Planet". Also has VIP cinema, karaoke; at Skytrain's National Stadium station. Has digital capability. Currently undergoing a comprehensive renovation program. It has one Zigma Cinestadium cinema.
SF Cinema Muang Thong Thani	5	1145	Cosmo Bazaar Muang Thong Thani, Nonthaburi	Opened 15 March 2019.
SF Cinema Nakhon Ratchasima	8	2096	Terminal 21 Korat	Opened 19 December 2016.
SF Cinema Nakhon Sawan	5	932	Central Nakhon Sawan	Opened 31 January 2024. It has one Zigma Cinestadium cinema.
SF Cinema Nakhon Si Thammarat	6	1035	Central Nakhon Si	Opened 28 July 2016.
SF Cinema Pattaya	6	1425	Central Marina Outlet Pattaya	Renovated from SF Multiplex in 2002.
SF Cinema Phayao	3	364	Tops Plaza Phayao	Opened 25 January 2019.
SF Cinema Phetchaburi	4	724	Big C Phetchaburi	Formerly as Thana Cineplex, Opened 16 June 2017.
SF Cinema Phetkasem	4	612	Big C Phetkasem 2, Bangkok	Opened 13 September 2018.
SF Cinema Prachinburi	4	882	Robinson Prachinburi	Opened 4 December 2014.
SF Cinema Rama 3	8	1746	Terminal 21 Rama 3, Bangkok	Opened 20 October 2022. It has one Zigma Cinestadium cinema.
SF Cinema Ramindra	6	1382	Central Ramindra, Bangkok	Formerly as UMG, Opened 25 February 2007.
SF Cinema Ratchaburi	3	539	Robinson Ratchaburi	Opened 25 May 2017.
SF Cinema Ratchaphruek	8	1465	The Crystal SB Ratchaphruek, Nonthaburi	Opened 1 December 2016.
SF Cinema Rattanathibet	5	1100	Central NorthVille, Nonthaburi (Old Central Rattanathibet)	Opened 3 July 2026. (Central Rattanathibet Formerly was 7 Cinemas)
SF Cinema Rayong	6	1528	Passione Shopping Destination Rayong (Old Laemtong Rayong)	SF Cinema Rayong Added 2 Cinema (Formerly was 9 Cinemas), Renovated from SF Multiplex in 2008. It has one Zigma Cinestadium cinema.
SF Cinema Sa Kaeo	3	690	Big C Sa Kaeo	Opened 4 July 2018.
SF Cinema Salaya	7	1334	Central Salaya, Nakhon Pathom	Opened 12 August 2014.
SF Cinema Samut Songkhram	3	529	Big C Samut Songkhram	Opened 30 November 2018.
SF Cinema Srinakarin	5	1003	JAS Urban Srinakarin, Samut Prakan	Opened 25 November 2016.
SF Cinema Srisaman	6	1111	Robinson Srisaman, Nonthaburi	Opened 11 November 2015.
SF Cinema Suphanburi	4	953	Robinson Suphanburi	Opened 2 March 2012.
SF Cinema Central Surat Thani	7	1542	Central Surat Thani	Opened 11 October 2012.
SF Cinema Coliseum Surat Thani	6	967	Coliseum Surat Thani	Formerly as Coliseum Cineplex
SF Cinema Surin	5	1089	Robinson Surin	Opened 20 December 2013.
SF Cinema Suvarnabhumi	6	1205	Market Village Suvarnabhumi, Bang Phli, Samut Prakan	Opened 30 September 2025.
SF Cinema Thalang	3	576	Robinson Thalang, Phuket	Opened 25 August 2022.
SF Cinema Tha Phra	8	1594	The Mall Lifestore Tha Phra, Bangkok	Formerly as NK THX, Facility to be expanded to up to 12 screens. The cinema is being promoted as "High Class Luxury Cinema Experience". Renovated facility opened in October 2007.
SF Cinema Trang	3	640	Robinson Trang	Opened 11 November 2010.
SF Cinema Ubon Ratchathani	7	1607	City Mall Shopping Center @ Sunee Tower Ubon Ratchathani	Opened 7 March 2012.
SF Cinema Udon Thani	8	1380	Landmark Plaza Udon Thani	Opened 22 February 2013.
SF Cinema Yala	3	521	Lotus's Yala	Opened 12 October 2024.

=== SF World Cinema ===
SF World Cinema is SF Group's flagship cinema location. It is located within CentralWorld in Bangkok. It caters to a top-end level of customers with services under the concept of "personalized touch" for every type of customers. Opened in January 2007 with a total of 15 screens and 4,121 seats, it is the flagship branch of the SF chain. The cinema is a venue for film premieres and festivals. Centara Grand and Bangkok Convention Centre is adjacent. The cinema also houses a number of digital projectors. The cinema has re-opened in October 2010 after undergoing extreme renovation due to the 2010 Red Shirt Protest and the following mass arson causing the CentralWorld mall to be engulfed in flames.

Cinema	Screens	Seats	Location	Remarks
SF World Cinema	15	2906	CentralWorld	8 Standard Cinemas; World Max Screen 1 Cinema; ACU Pay Cinema 1 Cinema; NT First Class 2 Cinemas; The Bed Cinema by Omazz 1 Cinema; Zigma CineStadium with Dolby Atmos 1 Cinema; MX4D presented by CP 1 Cinema

=== SFX Cinema ===
SFX Cinema is SF Group's premium brand of cinemas. The cinemas are decorated and offer a higher-end level of premium services and an array of latest technologies in cinema presentation such as First Class seating and Dolby three-way sound.

Cinema	Screens	Seats	Location	Remarks
SFX Central Chaengwattana	8	2077	Central Chaengwattana, sixth floor, Chaengwattana Road, Pak Kret, Nonthaburi	Opened in November 2008. The complex is slated to be Thailand's first all-digital cinema. in the concept of "Exotica Cinema".
SFX Maya Chiang Mai	10	2068	Maya Chiang Mai	Opened 23 January 2014. It has one Zigma Cinestadium cinema, a dual-4K projection and Dolby Atmos theater. and one First Class Cinema.
SFX Crystal Veranda Ekamai-Ramintra	8	1324	Crystal Veranda Ekamai-Ramintra, Bangkok	Opened 14 February 2016. It has one Zigma Cinestadium cinema, a dual-4K projection and Dolby Atmos theater. one The Bed Cinema and six First Class Cinema.
SFX Central GR9	11	2354	Central GR9, Bangkok	Opened 14 December 2011. It has one Zigma Cinestadium cinema, a dual-4K projection and Dolby Atmos theater. and one NT First Class Cinema.
SFX Central Korat	7		Central Korat	Opened 3 November 2017.
SFX Central Ladprao	10	2343	Central Ladprao, sixth floor, Phahonyothin Road, Bangkok	Opened in 2002 as the first in the SF Group's SFX "boutique" brand of cinemas. It has two First Class Cinema and digital capability. one Zigma Cinestadium cinema, a dual-4K projection and Dolby Atmos theater. and one The Bed Cinema.
SFX The Mall Lifestore Ngamwongwan	10	1934	The Mall Lifestore Ngamwongwan, Nonthaburi	A former APEX/The Mall Multiplex theater prior to 2001 and SF Cinema theater brand. It has one Zigma Cinestadium cinema, a dual-4K projection and Dolby Atmos theater. and one Happiness Cinema.
SFX Central Pattaya	8		Central Pattaya, Bang Lamung, Chonburi	Opened 23 January 2009. The complex contains 5 Standard Cinemas along with one Zigma Cinestadium cinema, a dual-4K projection and Dolby Atmos theater. one The Bed Cinema. and one MX4D Cinema. has bowling alley.
SFX Terminal 21 Pattaya	7	1370	Terminal 21 Pattaya, Bang Lamung, Chonburi	Opened 19 October 2018. It has three First Class Cinema.
SFX Central Phuket	8	1271	Central Phuket (Festival Building)	Opened in September 2004 as SFX Coliseum Cinema Brand. It has one Zigma Cinestadium cinema, a dual-4K projection and Dolby Atmos theater. and five First Class Cinema.

=== Emprive Cineclub ===
Emprive Cineclub is SF Group's exclusive brand of cinemas. It is located within The Emporium, in Bangkok. It caters to a top-end level of customers with services under the concept of "exclusive cinema experience" for top-end type of customers. Opened in February 2015 with a total of 5 screens and 1,200 seats, it is the luxurious branch of the SF chain.

Cinema	Screens	Seats	Location	Remarks
Emprive Cineclub	5	716	The Emporium, Sukhumvit 24, Khlong Toei, Bangkok	In second major remodeling of the top floors of The Emporium shopping complex, this branch was converted into luxurious format and bundled with 2 Dolby Atmos theater and its screening by Sony Digital Cinema system. It's formerly a United Artists theater and a SFX Cinema theater.

== Thana ==
Thana Cineplex is a chain of small cinemas based in Central Thailand.

Cinema	Screens	Seats	Location	Remarks
Thana Cineplex Nakhon Pathom	4		Big C Place Nakhon Pathom	
Thana Cineplex Phitsanulok	4		Big C Phitsanulok	
Thana Cineplex Tak	1		Big C Tak	Opened on 29 September 2011.

== Others ==
Cinema	Screens	Seats	Location	Remarks
Alliance française	1	225	29 South Sathon Road, Sathon	Holds regular screenings of French films and films from other countries with French subtitles.
Century The Movie Plaza	8		Phayathai Road, Ratchathewi	This multiplex anchoring a shopping mall opened in 2005. It is located near the Skytrain's Victory Monument station. The 2nd branch, Century The Movie Plaza Sukhumvit, is located nearby BTS Onnut station with a skywalk connecting the mall and the station.
Chumphae Cineplex	1		Chum Phae, Khon Kaen	
Goethe-Institut			18/1 Soi Goethe, Sathon Soi 1, Sathon	Regularly holds screenings of German films.
House Samyan	3	361	Samyan Mitrtown, Samyan	Moved from House RCA. AIS Play House 3 has a 35mm film projector for special screenings and House 5 is a Dolby Digital cinema. Ticket prices for non-member is at 160 baht and 140 baht for members.
Japan Foundation			10th Floor, Sermmit Tower, 159 Sukhumvit Soi 21, Watthana	Holds regular screenings of Japanese films, usually with Thai subtitles only.
Bangkok Screening Room (BKKSR)	1	50	2nd Floor, Woof Pack building, Soi Sala Daeng 1 (Rama IV Road side), Sala Daeng	Holds regular screenings of classic, foreign, independent and documentary films with a high-end 2K projector and surround sound system.
Embassy Diplomat Screens	5	234	Pathum Wan (Chit Lom), Bangkok	Located at Central Embassy. An all-sofa cineplex with premium service. Managed by Executive Cinema Corporation, a special team led by Major Cineplex CEO Vicha Poolvaraluk and the investors groups from Canada.
Nevada Multiplex	7	2100	Ubon Ratchathani	Opened in 1975. A cinema and hotel complex was the first multiplex in Thailand.
Sala Chalermkrung Royal Theatre	1		66 Charoen Krung Road, Wang Burapha Phirom, Phra Nakhon	Sala Chalermkrung is Bangkok's oldest cinema and was the first air-conditioned theater in Thailand. Built on the order of King Prajadhipok and named by him, it was opened on July 2, 1933. It is the only theater from the first "golden age" of Thai cinema still standing. No longer regularly showing movies, the theater has been renovated and is principally used for Thai dance performances.

== See also ==
- List of films shot in Thailand
- List of shopping malls in Thailand
- Bangkok International Film Festival – Held annually.
- Thai Short Film and Video Festival – Held annually; Thailand's longest-running film festival.
- World Film Festival of Bangkok – Held annually in October.
