= Central NorthVille =

- เซ็นทรัล นอร์ทวิลล์
- Location: Bangkrasor, Muang, Nonthaburi 11000, Thailand
- Coordinates: 13.866143°N 100.497862°E
- Address: 68/100, 68/919, Moo 8, Rattanathibet Road
- Opened: 5 November 1991 (Jusco Rattanathibet); 30 December 2003 (Central Rattanathibet); 3 July 2026 (Central NorthVille)
- Developer: Central Pattana
- Manager: Nantawat Naovaratpong
- Owner: Central Pattana
- Num. of stores: 215
- Num. of anchor tenants: 6
- Floor area: 140,000 square metres (1,500,000 sq ft) (Central Rattanathibet); 210,000 square metres (2,300,000 sq ft) (Central NorthVille)
- Floors: 3
- Parking: 2,000
- Website: www.centralplaza.co.th

Central NorthVille (Thai: เซ็นทรัล นอร์ทวิลล์) (previously known as CentralPlaza Rattanathibet, Central Rattanathibet) is a shopping mall located on Rattanathibet Road in Mueang Nonthaburi District, Nonthaburi.

== History ==
Jusco Rattanathibet was established by Siam Jusco Co., Ltd in 1991 as one of biggest shopping and supermarket in Mueang Nonthaburi District. Just 10 years later, Central Group tenants added to the existing Jusco building on the left side, which contains Power Buy, Supersports, B2S and HomeWorks within new entire concept as Central Power Center Rattanathibet.

Central Pattana acquired the shopping mall with land area of 48 rai for THB650 million from Siam Jusco Co., Ltd which was the largest Jusco's shopping mall in Thailand on 30 December 2003 and renamed to 'Central Rattanathibet Town Center' on 1 January 2004 and changed supermarket operator from AEON to Tops Supermarket.

=== Mall renovations ===
On 15 June 2005, Robinson Department Store opened new 19th branch in 7 years at 'Central Town Center'. Robinson Rattanathibet feature 2-story with gross floor area of 12,000 square metres (130,000 sq ft).

Central Pattana finished first phase shopping mall expansion of new 25,000 square metres (270,000 sq ft) retailing area including cinema and Robinson Department Store in September 2005.

The shopping mall was renamed to 'CentralPlaza Rattanathibet' and finished phase 2 expansion of retailing and parking area for THB1,882 million in December 2006.

Around 2023, it was confirmed that Central Pattana will renovated entire building from former Jusco side, resulted to demolished 33 years-building that opened since Jusco days, the new mixed-use building which still contains same anchor tenants would expected to opened in 2026.

== Anchor ==
Central Northville is divided into three main areas: the main building (Northville), the extension building (Orchardville), and residential areas. It comprises the following key areas:

NorthVille Wing (Old Central Rattanathibet Main Building)

- Tops Food Hall
  - Tops Flavour
  - Tops Wine Cellar
- Power Buy
- Supersports
- B2S
- Officemate (Temporary Shop)
- Food Ville
- Fitness First; a premium fitness club which certified as Hyrox training center.
- D-Sports Stadium
- SF Cinema NorthVille 5 Cinemas (SF Central Rattanathibet Formerly was 7 Cinemas)

OrchardVille Wing (Old Index Living Mall Building)

- Officemate (Coming Soon)

Residential Area

- PetVille Park and Jogging Track 450M
- PlayVille Park
- Auto1
- Phyll NorthVille
- Go! Hotel NorthVille

=== Previously anchor ===
- Robinson Department Store Rattanathibet (Move to Robinson Lifestyle Ratchaphruek)
- BnB Home (Old Homeworks Rattanathibet, Move to Thai Watsadu x BnB Home Rattanathibet)
- Index Living Mall Central Rattanathibet (Move to Little Walk Rattanathibet)
- Tops (Parking Building) (Move to Tops Food Hall Central NorthVille)

== See also ==
- List of shopping malls in Thailand
