= Central Marina =

Central Marina Outlet
- เซ็นทรัล มารีน่า เอาต์เล็ต
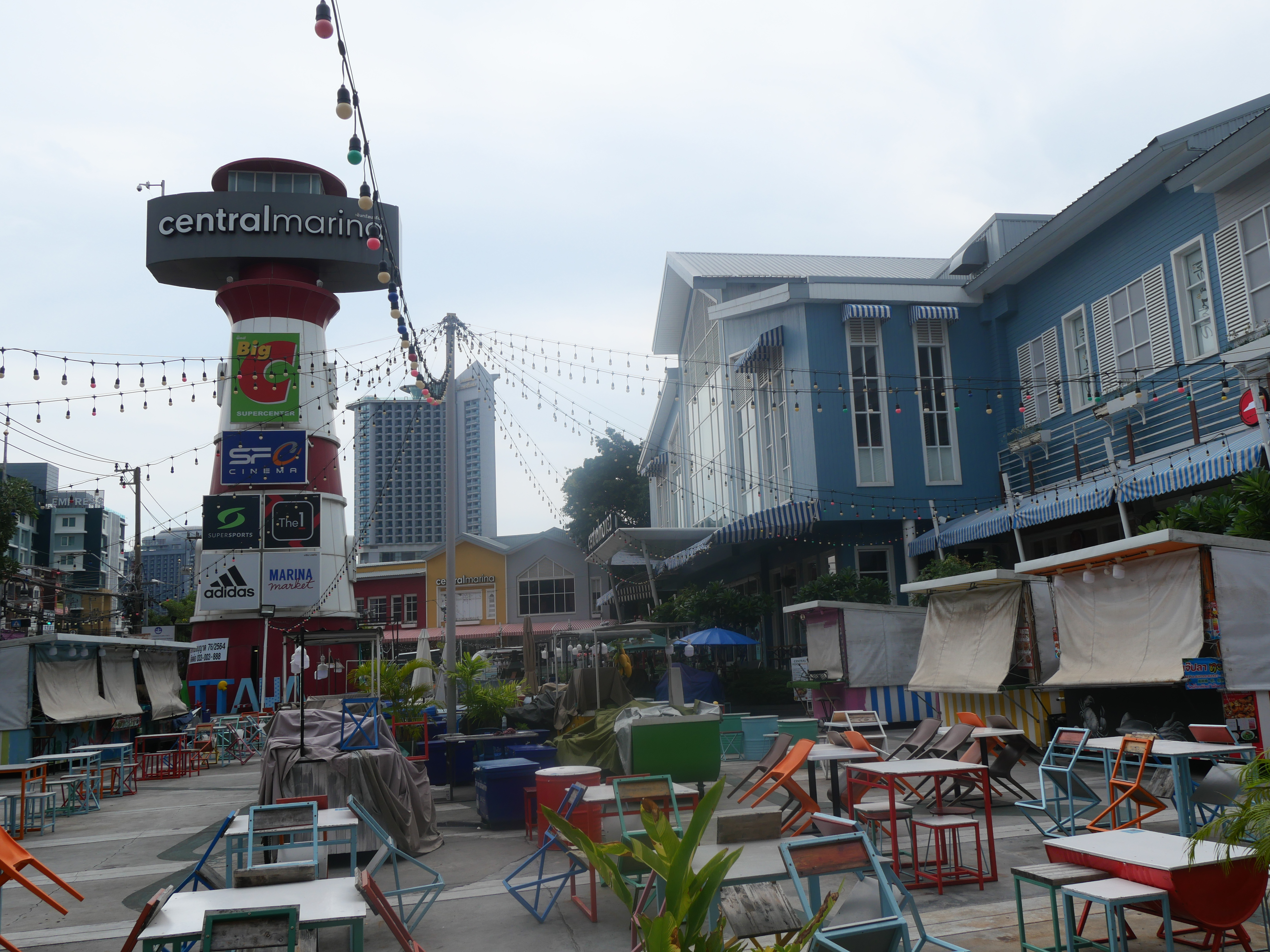
- On September 25, 2023
- Location: Pattaya, Bang Lamung, Chonburi, Thailand
- Coordinates: 12.945676°N 100.890239°E
- Address: 78/54 Moo 9, Pattaya Sai 2 Road
- Opened: July 31, 1995
- Previous names: Central Festival Center Pattaya (1995-2008); Central Center Pattaya (2008-2016)
- Developer: Central Pattana
- Manager: Pairoj Boonjan
- Owner: Central Pattana
- Num. of stores: 132
- Num. of anchor tenants: 3
- Floor area: 15,226 square metres (163,890 sq ft)
- Floors: 3
- Parking: 400
- Website: www.centralplaza.co.th

Central Marina Outlet (Thai: เซ็นทรัล มารีน่า เอาต์เล็ต) formerly known as Central Center Pattaya is a shopping mall on Pattaya Second Road in Pattaya, Bang Lamung, Chonburi, Thailand. It is the first CPN shopping center that is located in Pattaya. Another is Central Pattaya.

The complex has a Fisherman Village theme and consists of a shopping center, Big C Hypermarket, SF Cinema, seafood market and outdoor market, totalling 132 shops.

== Overview ==
Central Marina is the first CPN's shopping center outside of Bangkok. The shopping mall has 3 floors, with 2 anchor chains. It operates from 11 a.m. to 11 p.m.

Central Marina began operations in July 1995.

=== Architecture ===
The architecture of Central Marina is based heavily on Nordic marinas. The front sign of the mall on Pattaya Second road resembles a lighthouse.

== Anchors ==
- Big C
  - Food Avenue
- Supersports Factory Store (Old Fit by Supersports)
- Nike Factory Store
- Adidas Outlet
- Puma Outlet
- Skechers Outlet
- New Balance Outlet
- Pan & Arena Outlet Flagship Store
- Food Park
- Public House
- Party House
- Pattaya Marina Night Market
- Hug Craft
- SF Cinema 6 Cinemas

== Gallery ==
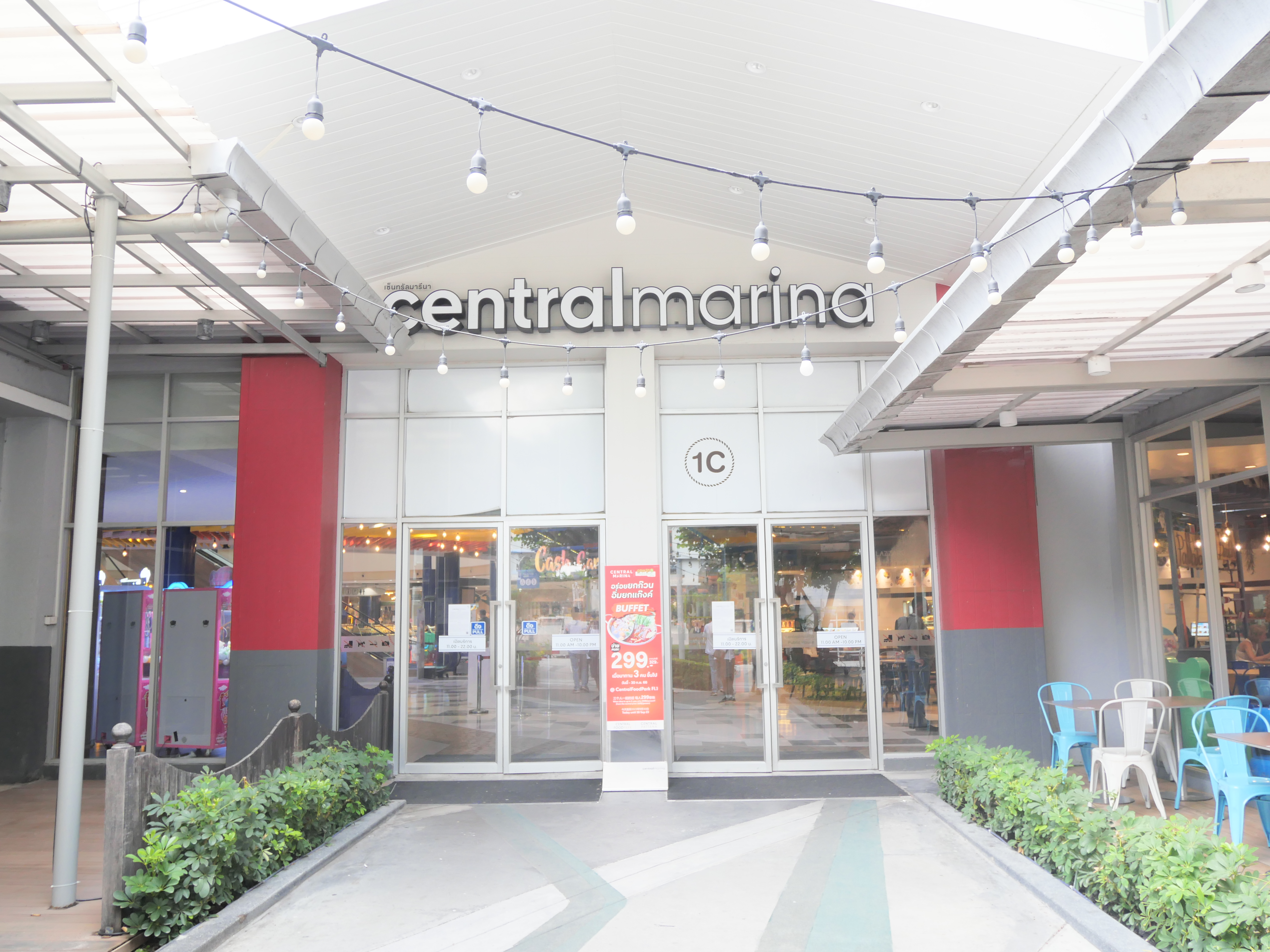
Pattaya Second road entrance

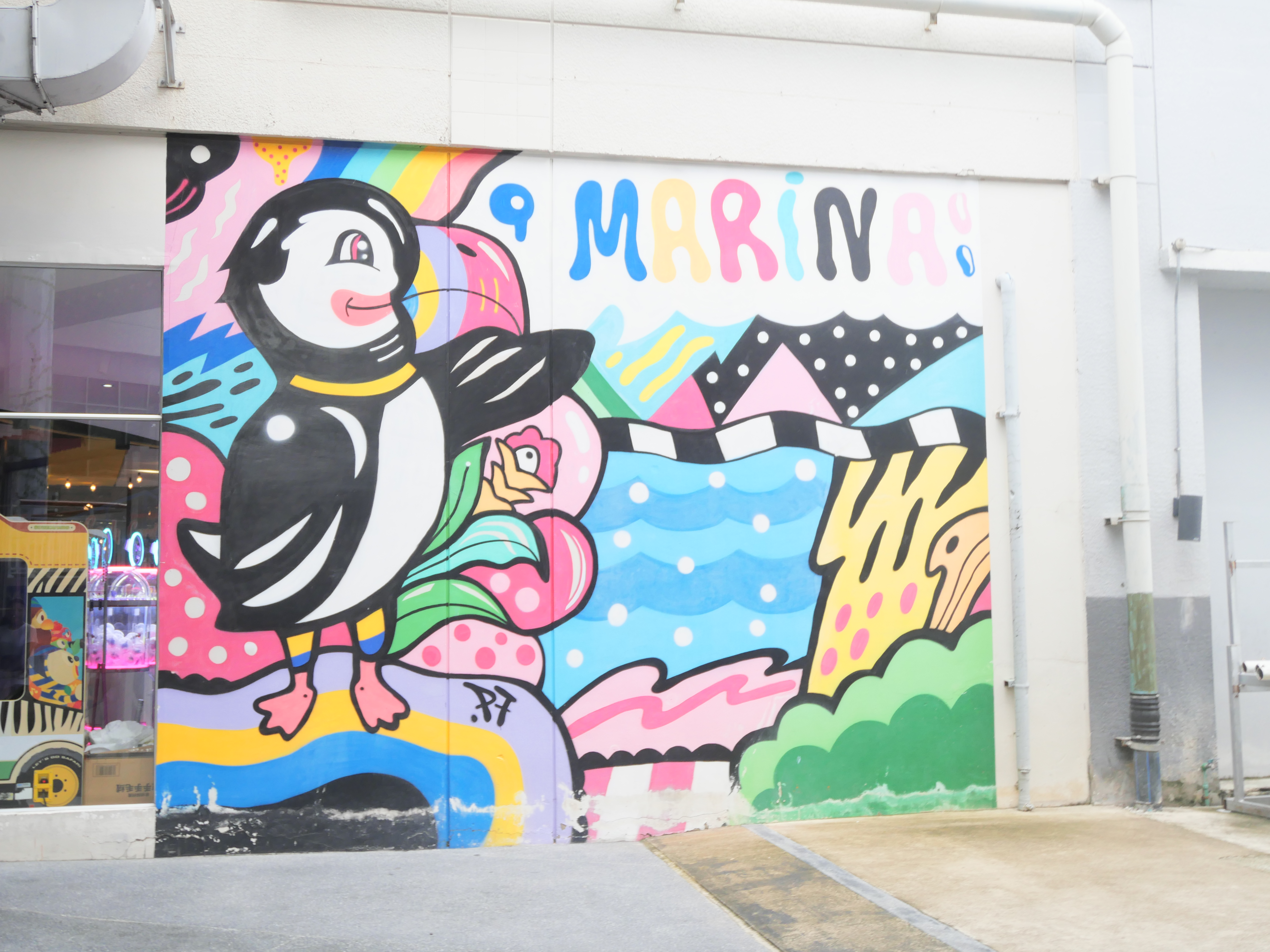
Art depicting a puffin

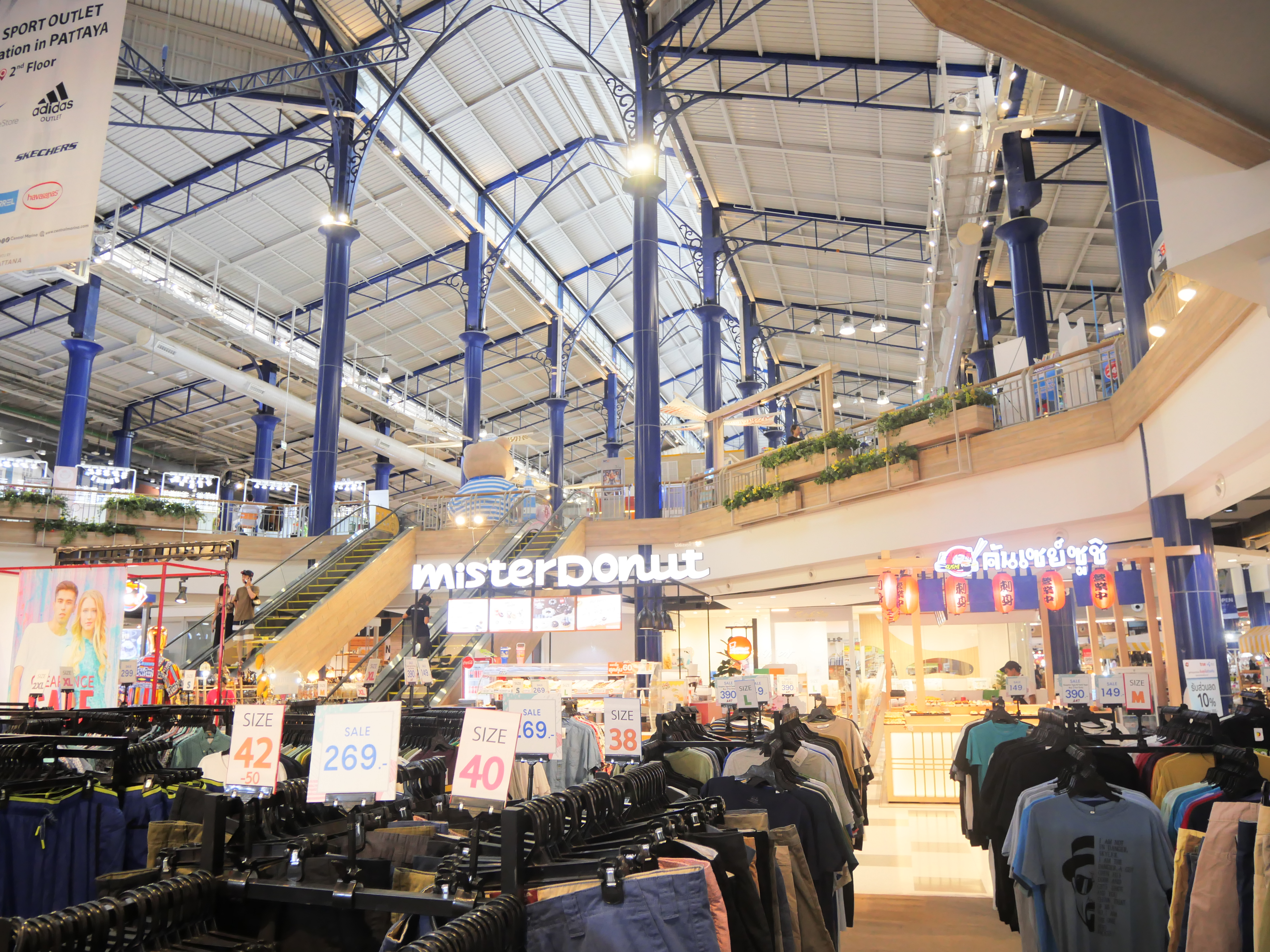
Interior in 2023

== See also ==
- List of shopping malls in Thailand
