= The Esplanade (Bangkok) =

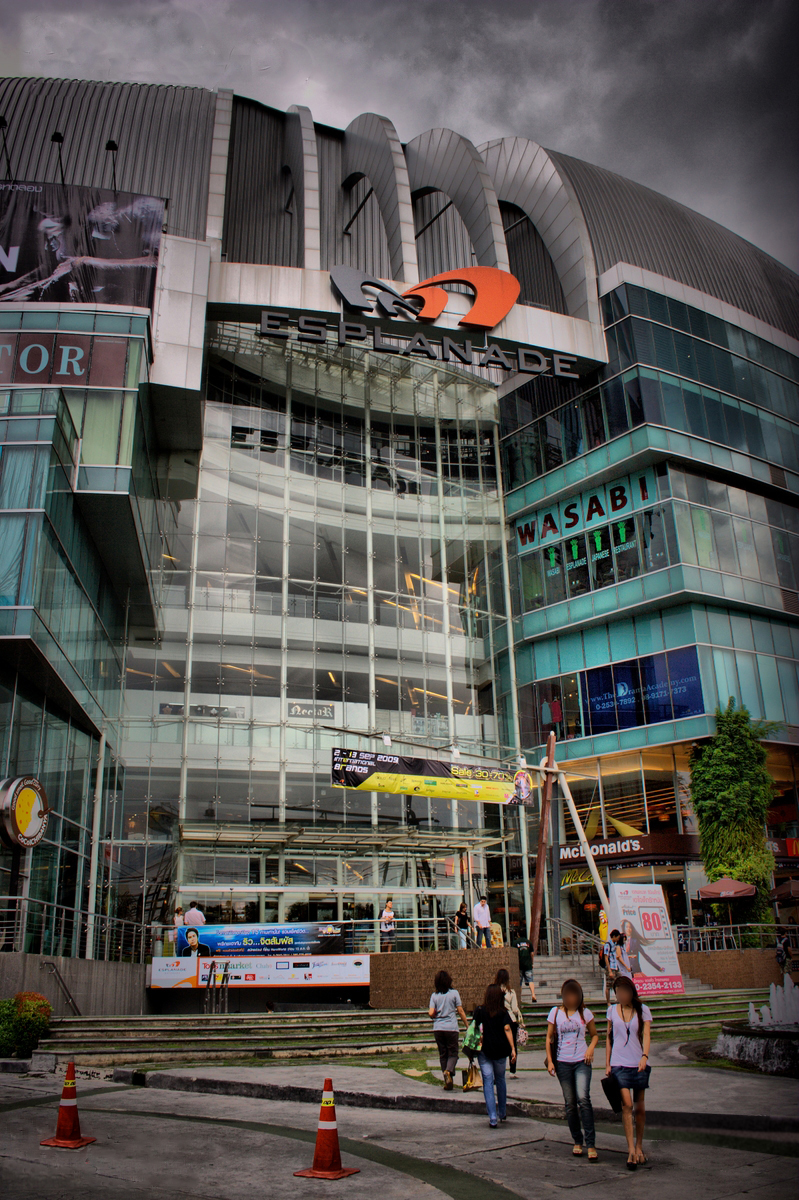
- Esplanade at Ratchadaphisek Rd.
- Location: Ratchadapisek Road, Din Daeng, Bangkok and Rattanathibet Road, Nonthaburi, Thailand
- Coordinates: 13°46′0″N 100°34′11″E
- Opened: 13 December 2006 (Ratchadapisek); 3 December 2009 (Ngamwongwan-Kaerai)
- Manager: Central Pattana Plc. (Ratchadapisek); Major Cineplex Property (Ngamwongwan-Kaerai)
- Owner: Central Pattana Plc. (Ratchadapisek); Major Cineplex Property (Ngamwongwan-Kaerai)
- Num. of stores: 120
- Floor area: 105,000 square metres (Ratchadapisek)
- Floors: 7 (Ratchadapisek); 4 (Ngamwongwan-Kaerai)

The Esplanade is a shopping and entertainment complex on Ratchadaphisek Road in Din Daeng district, Bangkok, with a second branch on Rattanathibet Road in Nonthaburi.

== History ==
Anchored by the Esplanade Cineplex, the shopping mall opened in December 2006. The cineplex hosted the 5th World Film Festival of Bangkok in October 2007.

With a retail space of more than 100,000 square metres, the seven-floor complex includes the 12-screen Esplanade Cineplex with 3,000 seats, a B2S book shop along with other shops and restaurants. Other facilities include a Rhythm & Bowl alley, the Sub Zero ice-skating arena, a Tops Supermarket and the 1,500-seat Ratchadalai Musical Theatre.

== Design ==
The architecture of the Esplanade shopping mall was designed by the Office of Bangkok Architects in collaboration with Contour. The interior of the mall was designed by J+H Boiffils, who had previously designed The Emporium and Siam Paragon shopping malls.

== Branches ==
- Ratchadapisek, Bangkok
- Rattanathibet, Nonthaburi

== See also ==
- List of shopping malls in Bangkok
- List of shopping malls in Thailand
- List of largest shopping malls in Thailand
- List of cinemas in Thailand
