= Central Khonkaen =

- Location: Muang, Khon Kaen 40000, Thailand
- Coordinates: 16.432604°N 102.825183°E
- Address: 99,99/1 Mittraphap-Srichan road intersection, Naimuang
- Opened: December 3, 2009
- Developer: Central Pattana
- Manager: Amornrat Bunyongsin
- Owner: Central Pattana
- Num. of stores: 363
- Floor area: 50,156 square metres (539,870 sq ft)
- Floors: 5
- Parking: 2,100
- Website: web.archive.org/web/20091110015126/http://www.centralplaza.co.th/khonkaen/ www.central.co.th

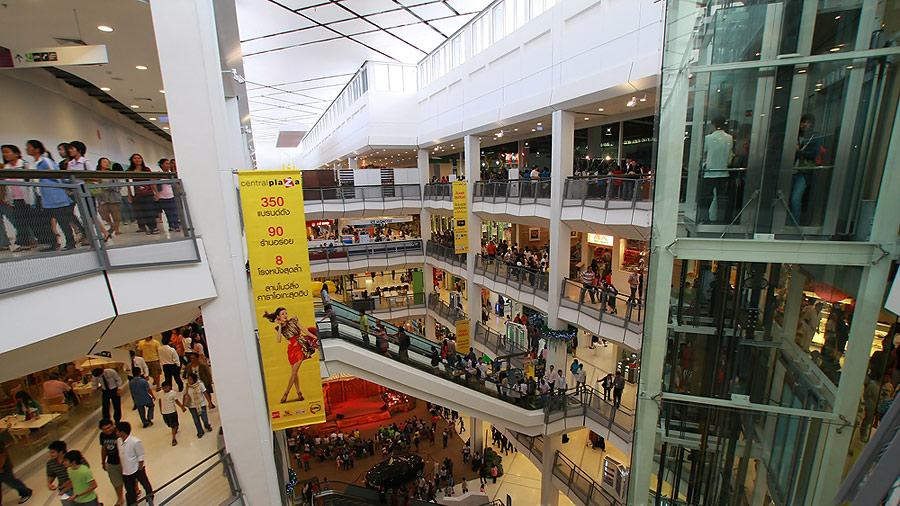
Interior of Central KhonKaen

Central Khonkaen (formerly CentralPlaza Khon Kaen) is a shopping mall in Khon Kaen, Thailand. The mall opened on December 3, 2009. It is the first shopping mall of Central Group in Isan of Thailand. It is the second largest retail corporation in the northeastern region of Thailand, the largest department store in the northeastern region is The Mall Nakhon Ratchasima.

== Anchors ==
- Central The Store @ Khon Kaen (4 December 2021 – Present, Renovate from Robinson department store)
- Tops
- SF Cinema 8 Cinemas
- Escent Condominium Khonkaen
- Khon Kaen Hall
- B2S Think Space
- Officemate
- Power Buy
- Supersports (in Central Department store)
- Food Patio (20 March 2026 – Present, Renovate from Food Park)
- Muji
- Harborland

=== Previously anchor ===
- Robinson Department Store (3 December 2009 - November 2021)
- SF Strike Bowl
- Food Park (3 December 2009 - 19 March 2026)

== See also ==
- List of shopping malls in Thailand
