= Diana Department Store =

Chain of department stores in southern Thailand

- Company type: Public limited company
- Traded as: SET: CGD
- Industry: Retailing
- Headquarters: Hat Yai, Songkla, Thailand
- Key people: Vikrom Koompirochana, chairman; Jirarat Pingclasai, CEO, deputy chairman and president
- Products: Department stores, Convenience stores,
- Revenue: 574.88 million baht (2005)
- Net income: -13.64 million baht (2005)
- Subsidiaries: Diana Convenience Store PCL
- Website: www.diana.co.th

Diana Department Store (Thai: ไดอาน่า ดีพาร์ทเมนท์สโตร์) is a chain of department stores in southern Thailand. It was a public company with a ticker symbol CGD and traded on the SET.

== Background ==
The company has three stores, one in Pattani and two in Hat Yai, Songkhla Province. It also has a chain of Di-Mart convenience stores in Songkhla and Pattani.

In 2006, Diana Department Store exited from the Stock Exchange of Thailand, sold under the backdoor of DragonOne company. The old SET code was DIANA.

== See also ==
- List of shopping malls in Thailand
