= Central Pattaya =

- เซ็นทรัล พัทยา
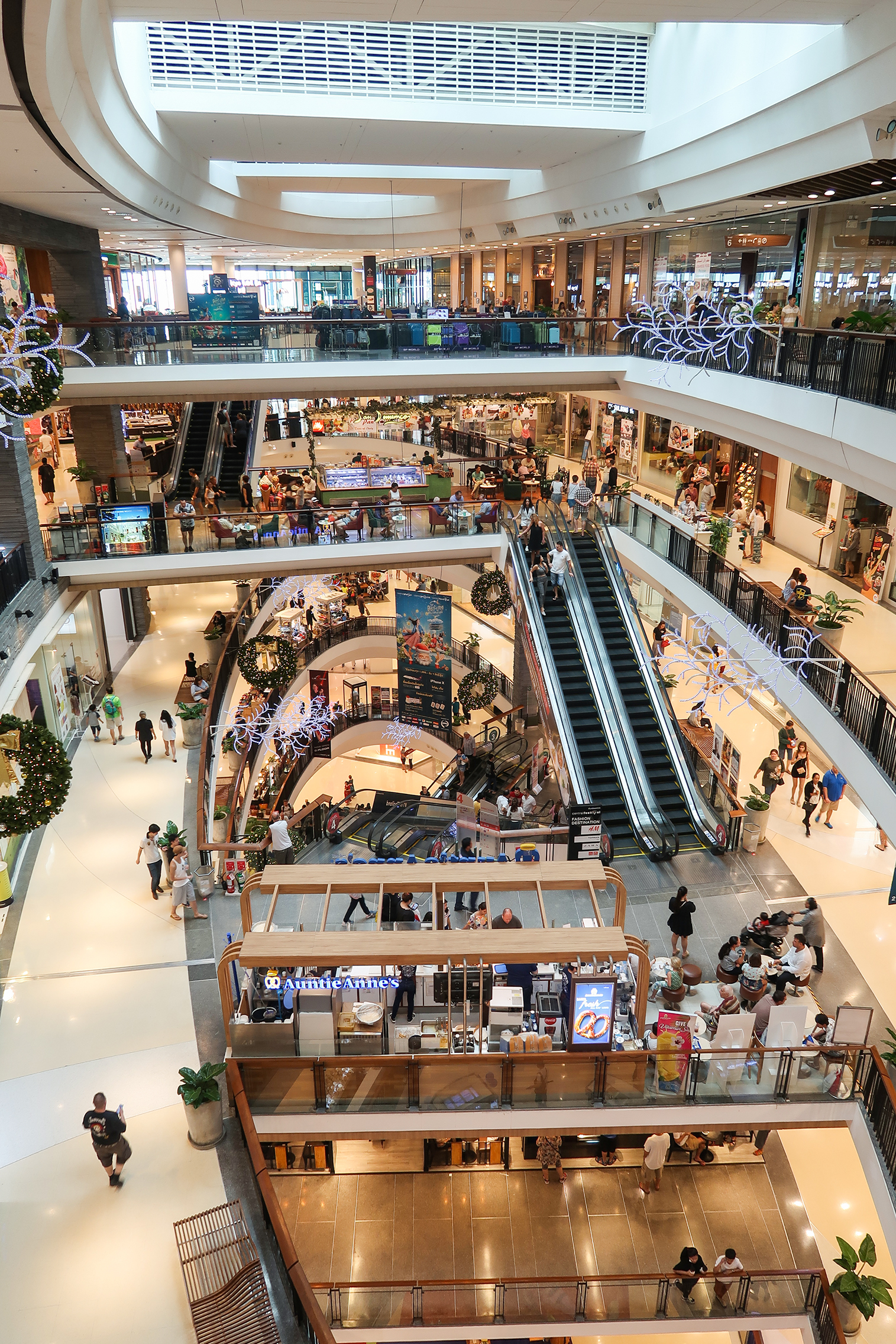
- Atrium of Central Pattaya (2018)
- Location: 333/99 Moo 9, Nong Prue Subdistrict, Bang Lamung, Pattaya, Chonburi 20260, Thailand
- Coordinates: 12°56′04″N 100°53′02″E
- Opened: January 23, 2009
- Previous names: CentralFestival Pattaya Beach
- Developer: Central Pattana
- Manager: Sarun Tuntijumnun
- Owner: Central Pattana
- Num. of stores: 313
- Floor area: 57,150 square metres (615,200 sq ft)
- Floors: 7
- Parking: 2,000
- Public transit: Bus Station on Beach Road at the Front
- Website: centralpattana.co.th

Central Pattaya (Thai:เซ็นทรัลพัทยา), previously CentralFestival Pattaya Beach, is a shopping mall in Pattaya, Thailand. The mall opened in 2009 and was the first shopping mall of Central Pattaya, Thailand's largest retail corporation under the "Central Pattaya" brand. Central Pattaya is the largest beachfront shopping center in all of Southeast Asia.

== Overview ==
The mall has a retail podium of 200,000 m^{2} on 7 floors. It houses more than 370 retail shops, 5 anchors including an entertainment complex, a 5-floor central department store and has direct access to a 302-room hotel, the Hilton Pattaya. The mall is situated at approximately Pattaya Beach Soi 9, and one side of the mall is next to Pattaya 2nd Road, while the other side is at Pattaya Beach Road. The complex also houses the Pattaya Hilton Hotel, which opened in November 2010 and is located on the 7th floor of the complex. The building also offers a panoramic view of the sea from Pattaya.

== History ==
Due to concerns around public safety from gun violence following the Siam Paragon shooting on 3 October 2023, Pattaya police staged a drill on 7 November where they responded to a fake shooting at Central Pattaya. The mall has also tightened security in collaboration with Pattaya Beach, with its CTV system being upgraded and a war room being established.

== Architecture ==
From a distance, the building sticks out due to its height, due mostly to the Hilton hotel that sits atop the shopping mall, whose sign is also more visible than the actual shopping mall from afar. With the Hilton hotel, the entire building stretches another 34 stories into the skyline.

The building's front facing the beach is lined with palm trees at the front. Towards the actual building, is a plaza area and escalators in which the building can be accessed from the beach. The building however attempts to blend traditional and modern architecture together. The front of the building is curved while the façade opens at 111 meters wide to give the interior a more natural look. In line with traditional architecture, there is extensive use of wood and windows in order to bring in more natural light and give more of an open-air resort atmosphere.

== Anchors ==
- Central The Store @ Pattaya
- Tops Food Hall
- SFX Cinema 8 Cinema
  - SF Strike Bowl
- Hilton Hotel Pattaya
- B2S
- Power Buy
- Supersports
- Nitori
- Central Food
  - Food Park
  - Beach Eats

== Parking ==
The mall is capable of providing parking places for over 2,000 vehicles.

== Gallery ==
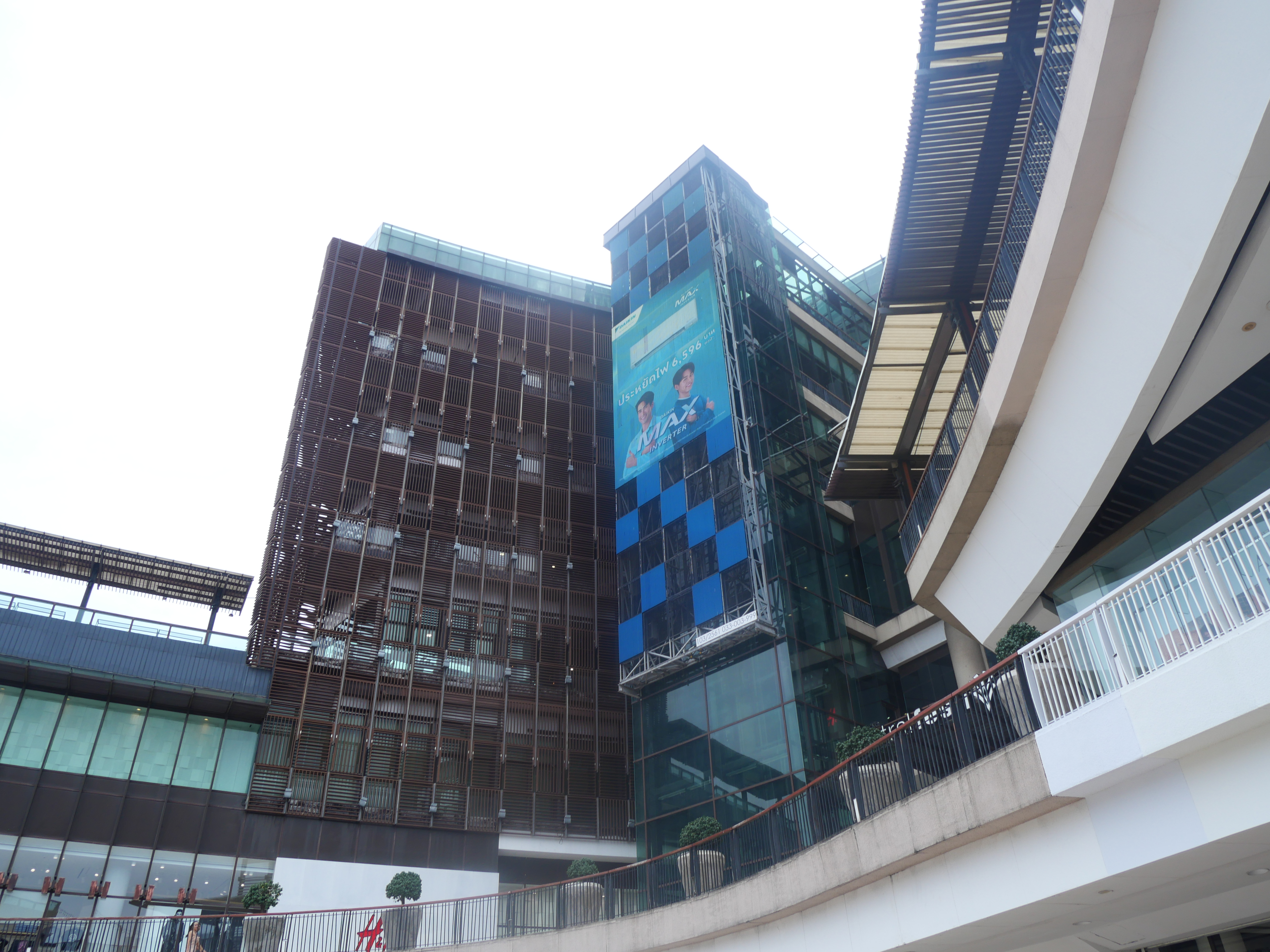
Facing Pattaya Beach, 2023

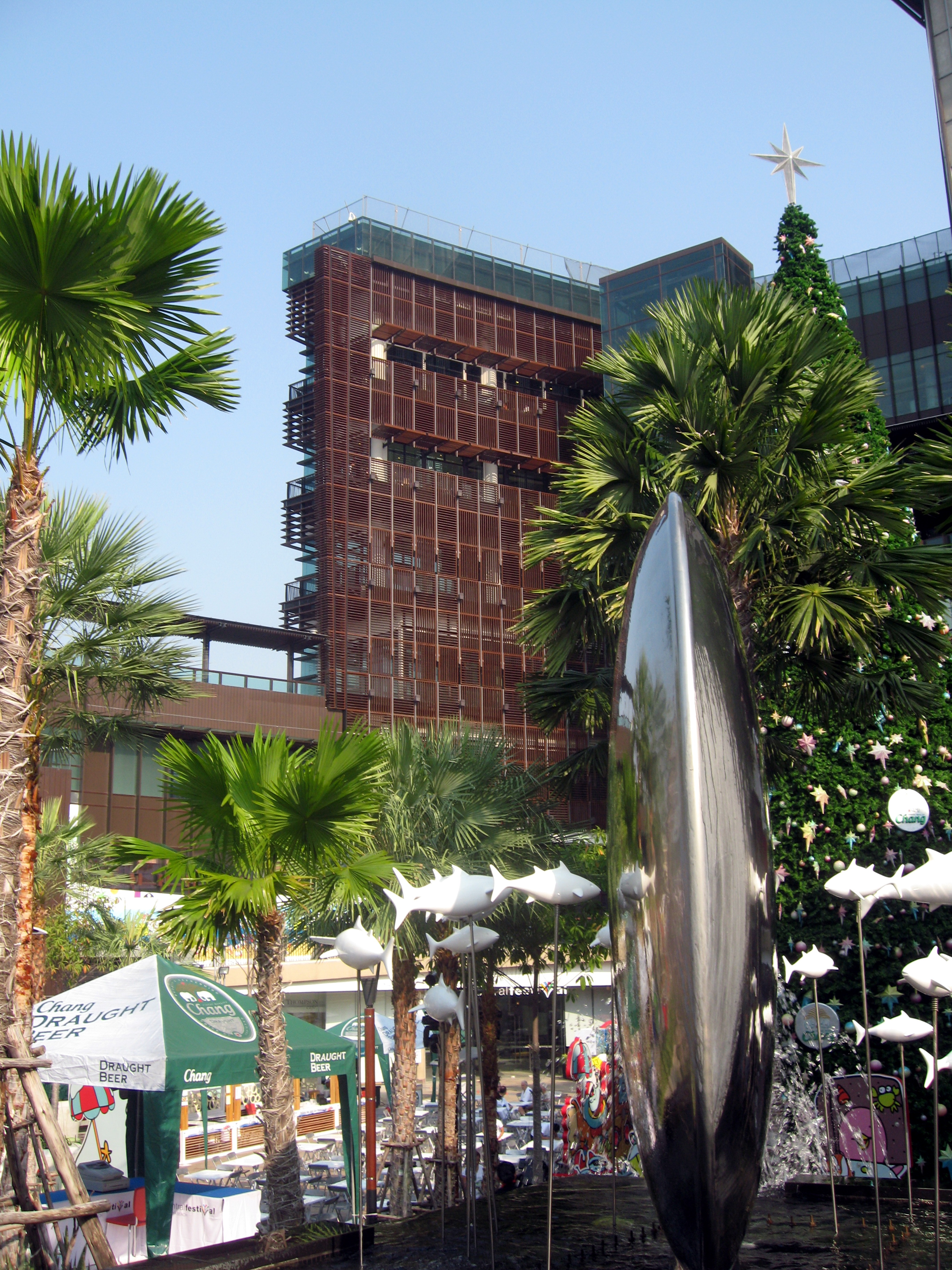
Christmas decorations in 2009

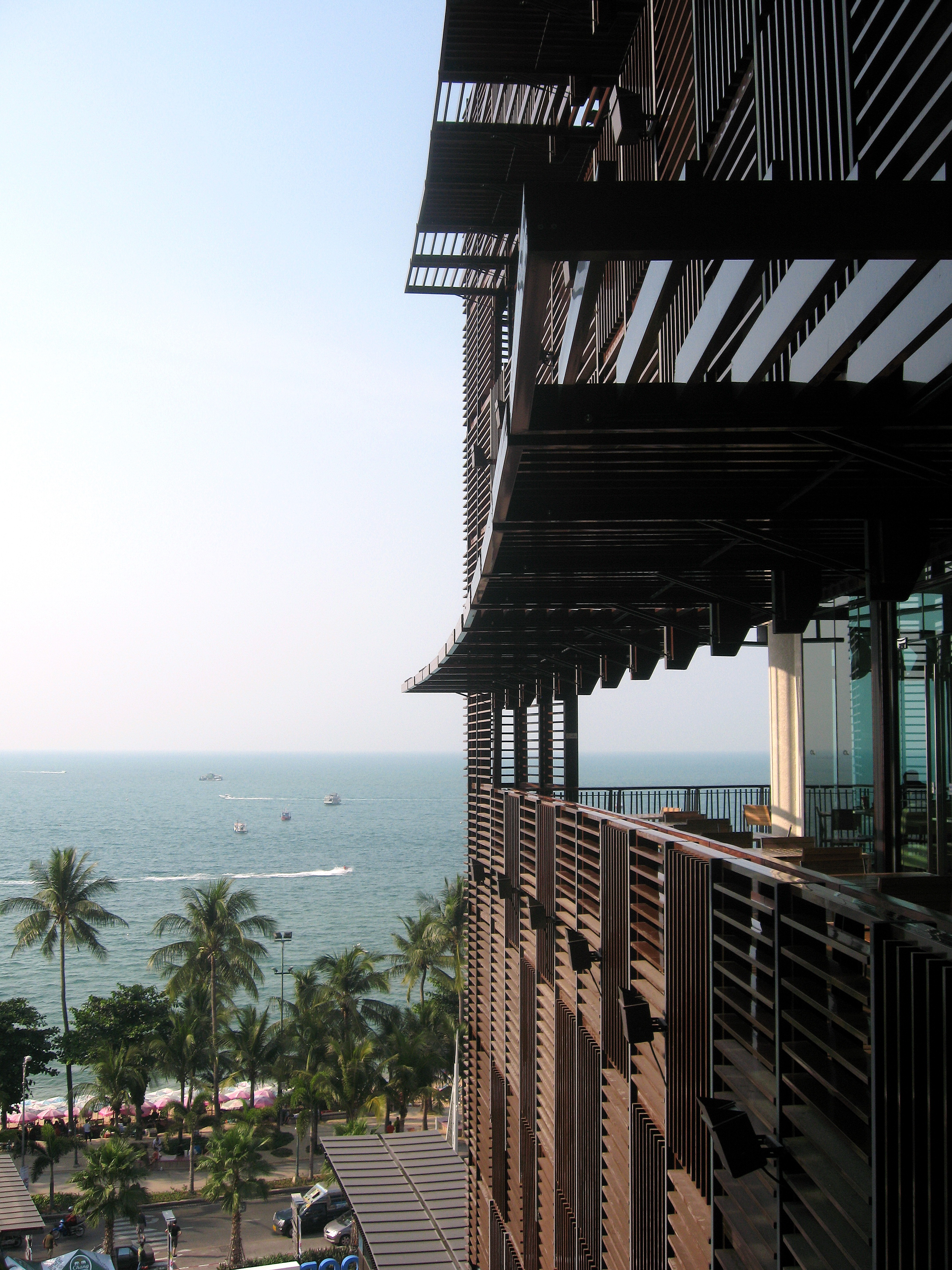
View of the Bay of Bangkok

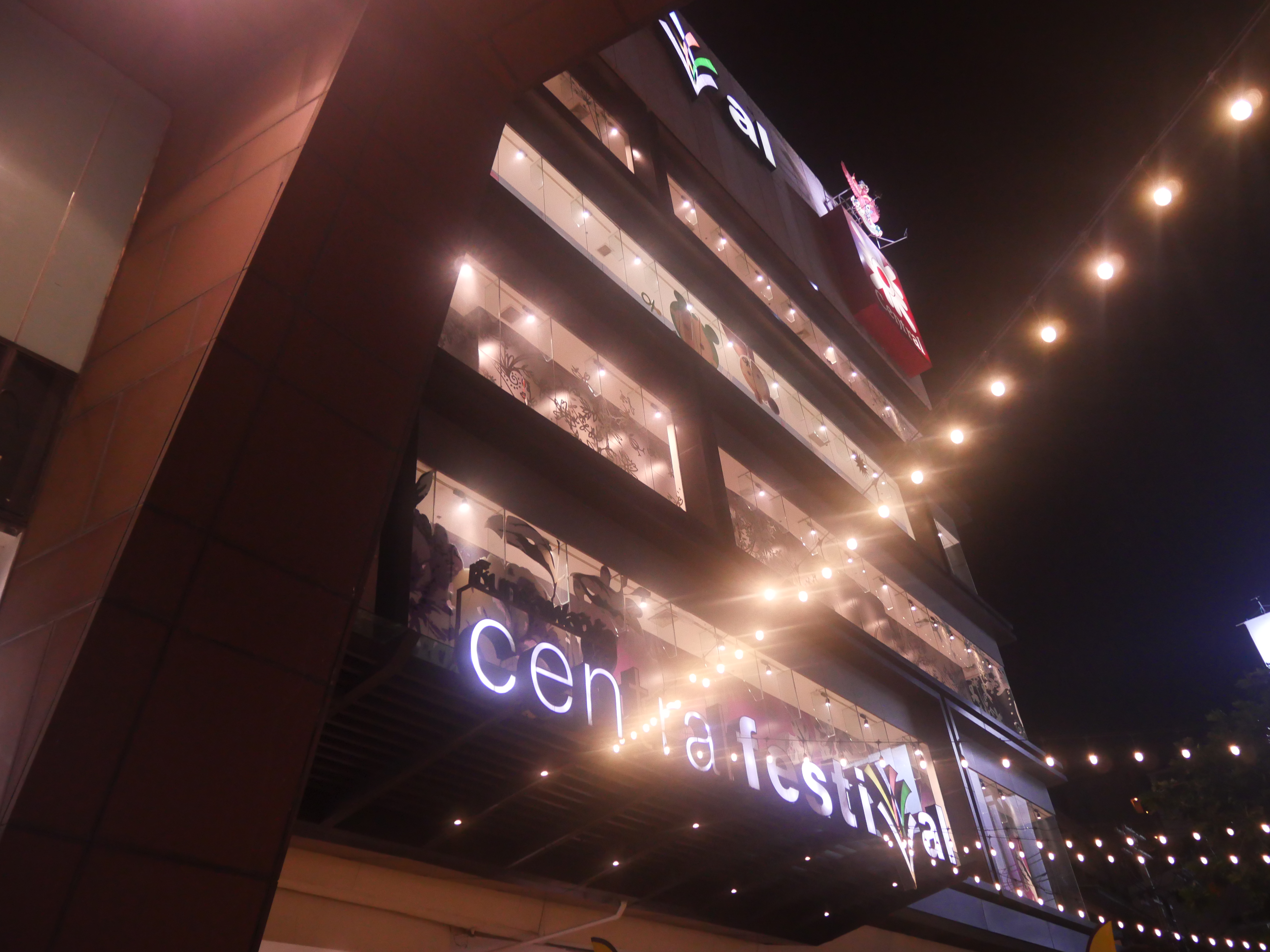
Pattaya second road entrance at night, 2023

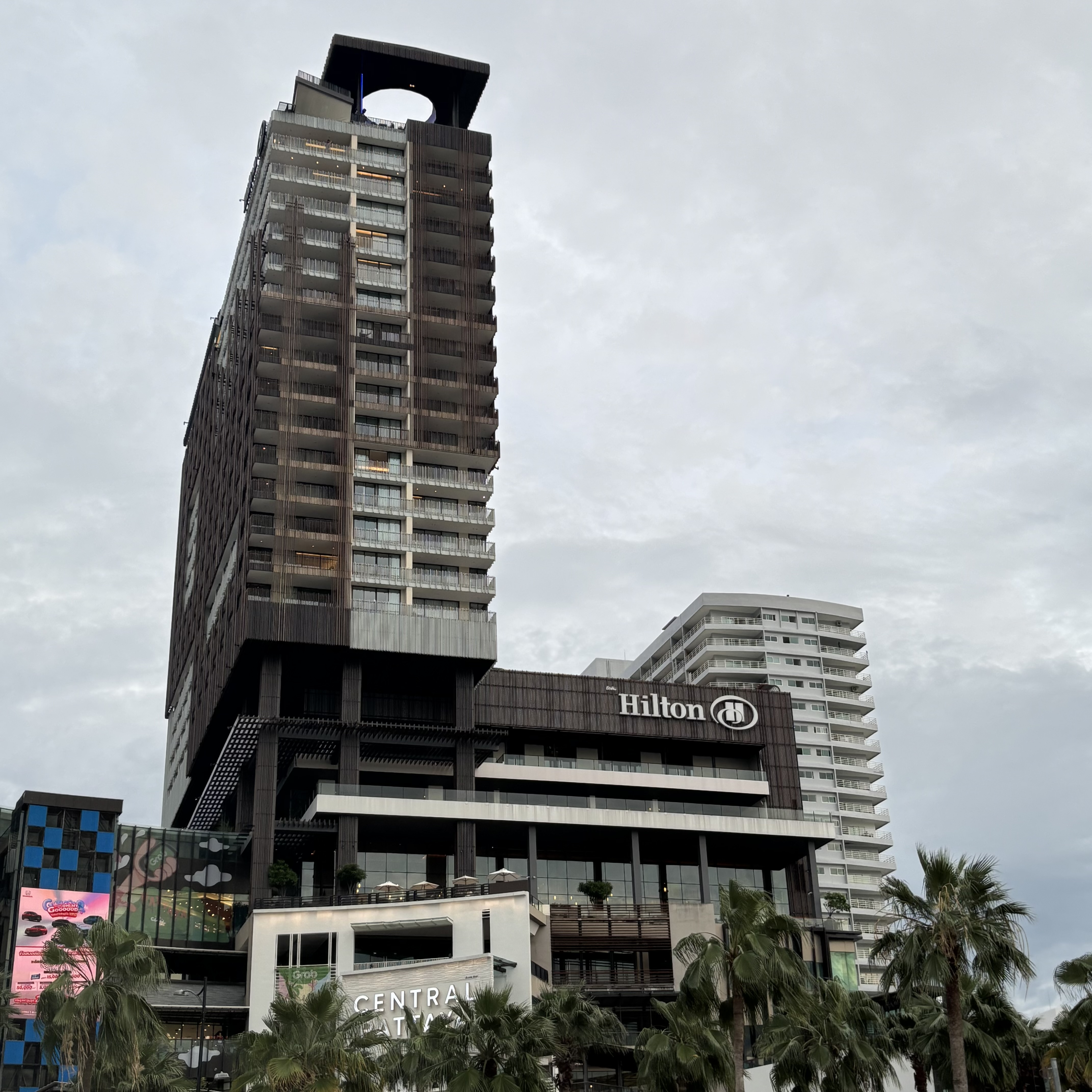
Hilton Pattaya Hotel next to the mall, 2025

== See also ==
- List of shopping malls in Thailand
