= List of shopping malls in Thailand =

The following is a list of notable shopping malls in Thailand, by province:

== Buriram province ==
- Robinson Buriram
- Taweekit Supercenter

== Chachoengsao province ==
- Robinson Chachoengsao

== Chaiyaphum province ==
- Robinson Chaiyaphum

== Chanthaburi province ==
- Central Chanthaburi
- Robinson Chanthaburi

== Chiang Mai province ==
- Central Chiang Mai
- Central Chiang Mai Airport
- Icon IT Chiang Mai
- MAYA Lifestyle Shopping Center
- Meechok Plaza
- Pantip Chiang Mai

== Chiang Rai province ==
- Central Chiang Rai

== Chonburi province ==
=== Chonburi ===
- Central Chonburi
- Robinson Amatanakorn Chonburi
- Tukcom Chonburi

=== Pattaya ===
- Central Marina, Central Pattaya
- Central Pattaya, Central Pattaya
- Terminal 21, Central Pattaya
- Harbor Pattaya, Central Pattaya
- Royal Garden Plaza Pattaya, Central Pattaya
- Mike Shopping Mall, South Pattaya
- Royal Garden Plaza, South Pattaya

=== Sriracha ===
- Central Sriracha
- Pacific Park Sriracha
- Robinson Bowin (Sriracha)
- Tukcom Sriracha

=== Laemchabang ===
- Harbor Mall Laemchabang

=== Bangsaen ===
- Laemtong Bangsaen

== Chumphon province ==
- Ocean Shopping Mall

== Kamphaeng Phet province ==
- Robinson Kamphaeng Phet

== Kanchanaburi province ==
- Robinson Kanchanaburi

== Khon Kaen province ==
- Central Khonkaen
- Central Khonkaen Campus
- Fairy Plaza
- Kaenket

== Krabi province ==
- Central Krabi

== Lampang province ==
- Central Lampang

== Lamphun province ==
- Jampha Shopping Mall

== Lopburi province ==
- Robinson Lopburi

== Maha Sarakham province ==
- Sermthai Complex
- Sermthai Plaza

== Mukdahan province ==
- Robinson Mukdahan

== Nakhon Pathom province ==
=== Nakhon Pathom ===
- Central Nakhon Pathom

=== Sam Phran ===
- Central Salaya

== Nakhon Ratchasima province ==
- Central Korat
- Terminal 21 Korat
- The Mall Lifestore Korat

== Nakhon Si Thammarat province ==
=== Nakhon Si Thammarat ===
- Central Nakhon Si
- Sahathai Plaza Nakhon Si Thammarat

=== Thung Song ===
- Sahathai Plaza Thung Song

== Nakhon Sawan province ==
- Central Nakhon Sawan
- The Walk Nakhon Sawan
- V at WastTown Nakhon Sawan (Opened in 2027)
- V-Square Plaza Nakhon Sawan

== Nong Khai province ==
=== Nong Khai ===
- Asawann Nongkhai 1 (Lotus's)
- Asawann Nongkhai 2 (Big C)
- Robinson Nong Khai (Opened in April 2027)

=== Phon Phisai district ===
- Asawann Phonphisai

== Phayao province ==
- Robinson Phayao (Opened in 2027)

== Phrae province ==
- Mark Four Plaza

== Phetchaburi province ==
- Robinson Phetchaburi

== Phra Nakhon Si Ayutthaya province ==
- Ayutthaya City Park
- Central Ayutthaya
- The Sky Ayutthaya

== Phitsanulok province ==
- Central Phitsanulok
- Topland Plaza Phitsanulok

== Phuket province ==
=== Phuket ===
- Central Phuket
- Iconphuket (Opened in 2029)
- Limelight Phuket
- Robinson Chalong

=== Patong ===
- Jungceylon Shopping Center

=== Talang ===
- Robinson Talang

== Prachinburi province ==
- Robinson Prachinburi

== Prachuap Khiri Khan province ==
=== Hua Hin ===
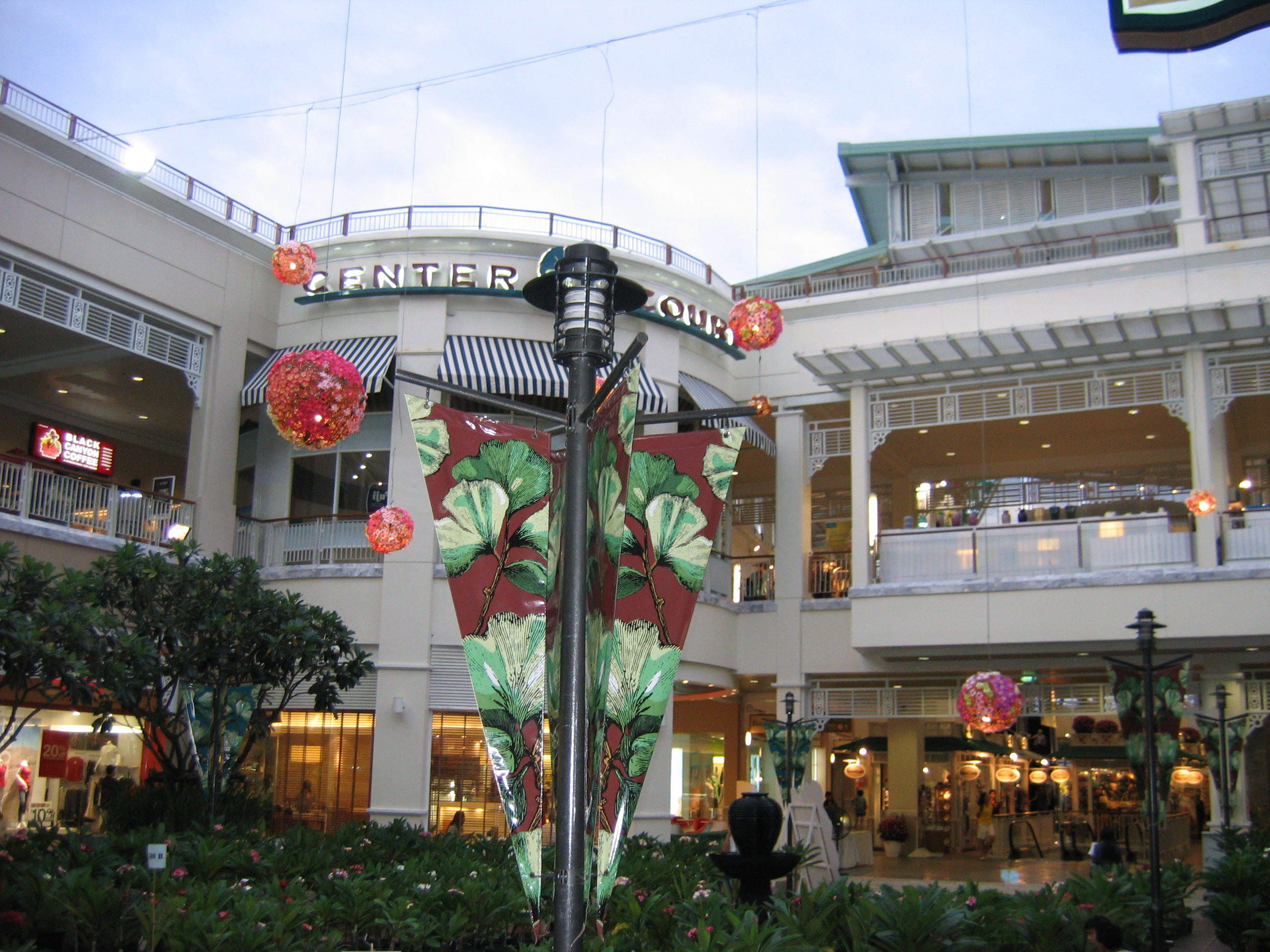
Hua Hin Market Village

- Hua Hin Market Village
- BLÚPORT Hua Hin Resort Mall

== Rayong province ==
=== Rayong ===
- Central Rayong
- Passion Shopping Destination Rayong

=== Ban Chang ===
- Robinson Ban Chang

=== Pluak Daeng ===
- CK Plaza Pluak Daeng

== Ratchaburi province ==
- Robinson Ratchaburi

== Roi Et province ==
- Robinson Roi Et

== Sakon Nakhon province ==
- Robinson Sakon Nakorn
- Srisakol Mall

== Saraburi province ==
- Robinson Saraburi
- Suk-Anan Park Saraburi

== Songkhla province ==
=== Hat Yai ===
- Central Hatyai
- Diana Shopping Mall

== Suphanburi province ==
- Robinson Suphanburi

== Surat Thani province ==
=== Surat Thani ===
- Central Suratthani
- Coliseum Surat Thani
- Sahathai Gorden Plaza

=== Ko Samui ===
- Central Samui

== Surin province ==
- Robinson Surin
- Surin Plaza

== Tak province ==
=== Mae Sot ===
- Robinson Mae Sot

== Trang province ==
- Leemart Shopping Center
- Robinson Trang
- Siriban Shopping Center

== Ubon Ratchathani province ==
- Central Ubon
- Sunee Tower

== Udon Thani province ==
- Central Udon
- Landmark Plaza Udonthani

== Defunct ==
- Kad Suan Kaew Shopping Park Chiang Mai (closed in 2022)
- Promenada Resort Mall Chiang Mai (closed in 2022)
- Robinson Ocean Nakhon Si Thammarat (closeed in 2026)
- Taweekit Complex Saraburi (closed in 2026)

== See also ==
- List of shopping malls in Bangkok
