= The Mall Lifestore Korat =

The Mall Korat (Nakhon Ratchasima)
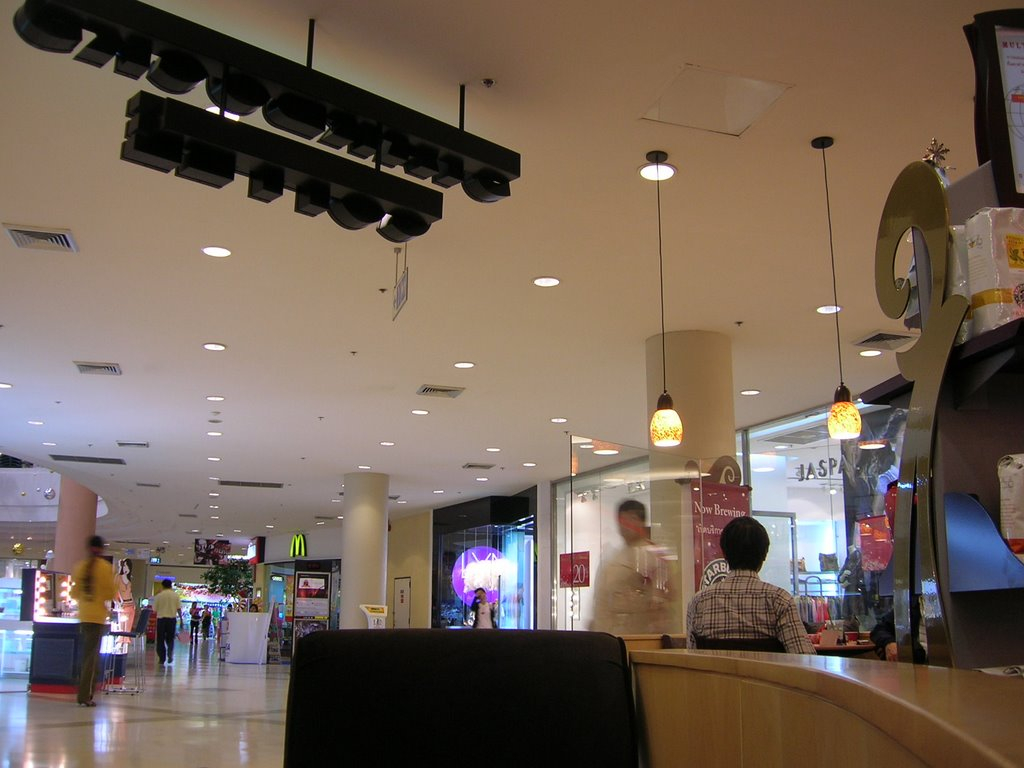
- The Mall Lifestore Korat (Nakhon Ratchasima)
- Location: Mittraphap Road, Mueang Nakhon Ratchasima, Nakhon Ratchasima
- Coordinates: 14.980638°N 102.076651°E
- Opened: August 10, 2000
- Developer: The Mall Group
- Manager: The Mall Group
- Owner: The Mall Group
- Num. of stores: 400+
- Floor area: 350,000 m^{2} (renovation in September 2016)
- Floors: 4 (9 floors for office tower)
- Parking: 3,500
- Website: themallgroup.com

The Mall Lifestore Korat (Nakhon Ratchasima), also known as The Mall Korat (Nakhon Ratchasima), opened in 2000, is a shopping mall in Nakhon Ratchasima Province, Thailand. It is the biggest shopping center in northeastern Thailand.

== Anchors ==
- The Mall Department Store
  - Be Trend
  - Power Mall
  - Sports Mall
  - Beauty Hall
- Gourmet Market (The First Branch in Northeast)
  - Gourmet Eats
- Korat Cineplex 10 Cinemas (Old EGV Korat)
- SB Design Square
- Fantasia Lagoon Watepark
- Fitness First
- MCC Hall Korat

== See also ==
- List of shopping malls in Thailand
