= Robinson Lifestyle =

- Product type: Shopping malls
- Current owner: Central Retail Corporation
- Country: Thailand
- Introduced: 2010

Robinson Lifestyle (previously Robinson Lifestyle Center) is a chain of shopping malls operated by Robinson Co., Ltd. as part of its Robinson Department Store brand under Central Group. The first branch opened in Trang, Thailand on 11 November 2010. The Lifestyle brand concept is for medium-sized malls, with the aim of penetrating secondary provinces where big shopping malls are not present. A typical sized mall will have a retail space of around 30,000 square meters, with 20,000 net leasable area. Its twenty-third branch was opened in 2019.

== See also ==
- List of shopping malls in Thailand
