= Hua Hin Market Village =

Shopping mall in Thailand

Coordinates: 12.557788°N 99.960394°E

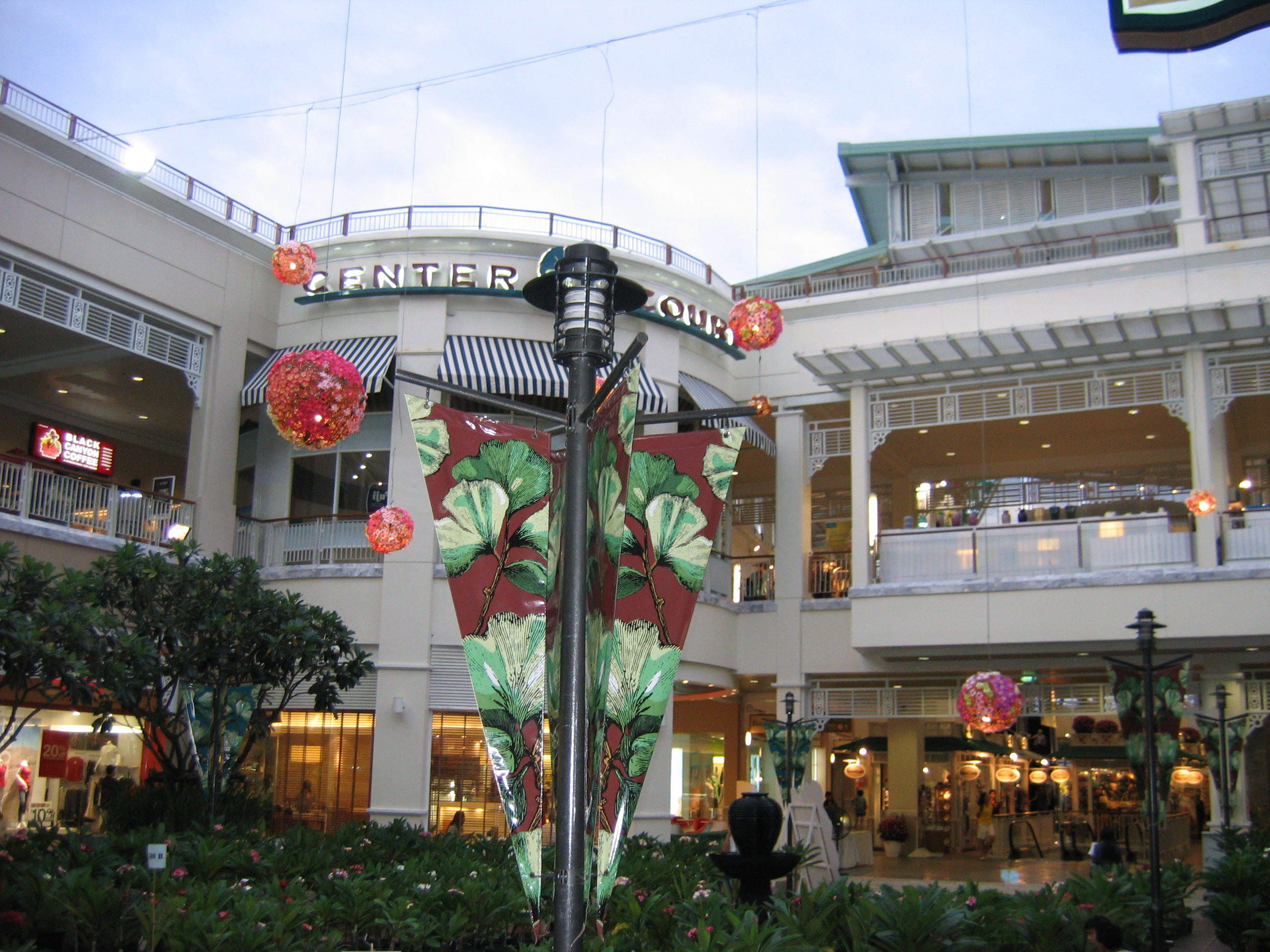
Center Court

Hua Hin Market Village is a shopping mall in Hua Hin, Prachuap Khiri Khan Province, Thailand. The first large-scale shopping and entertainment complex in the beach resort town, it opened in February 2006.
