= SF Group =

Thai cinema and entertainment venue operator

SF Corporation
- Type: Private
- Industry: Movie theaters Bowling alleys Karaoke booths
- Founded: 1999; 27 years ago
- Headquarters: Pathum Wan, Bangkok, Thailand
- Key people: Suwat Thongrompo (CEO); Suvit Thongrompo (COO); Suvannee Chinchiewchan (CMO)
- Products: SF Cinema (SFC); SFX Cinema (SFX); SFW World Cinema (SFW); Emprivé Cineclub
- Number of employees: 3000
- Website: www.sfcinemacity.com

SF Group is a cinema and entertainment venue operator in Thailand. Behind the combined operations of Major Cineplex and the EGV chain, SF Group is the second-largest cinema chain in Thailand, with more than 379 screens in 63 locations.

== History ==
SF Corporation Public Company Limited, based in Bangkok, Thailand, was established as a limited company in 1998 by Suwat Thongrompo.

The Thongrompo family is from Eastern Thailand, where its Samarn Film Co operated cinemas since the 1970s in Chonburi, Rayong and Chanthaburi.

The company become known as SF Cinema City in 1999 when it opened its first multiplex in Bangkok on the seventh floor of MBK Center. The company is still primarily centered in Bangkok and the Eastern Seaboard provinces. However, in 2005, the company expanded to southern Thailand by opening SFX Central Festival cinema in Phuket Town. A branch of SF Cinema City branch in the Jungceylon complex on Patong Beach followed in October 2007.

Also in 2007, the company undertook an overhaul branding change, with the corporate name SF Group adopted in March 2007.

- ‘SF World Cinema ‘, ‘SFX Cinema’, ‘SF Cinema’, ‘Emprive Cineclub’ -

Apart from the cinema, the company also own and operate Food and Beverage business, Bowling business under ‘SF Strike Bowl’ brand, Rental Space business, Advertising business for both screen and non-screen surroundings and other related business.

SF Group employ more than 3,000 employees and operate more than 379 screens throughout Thailand.

== Theaters and locations ==
As of 2018, SF Group has 63 branches throughout Thailand, mainly concentrated in Bangkok and in eastern Thailand. The chain's brands include:

- SF World Cinema (SFW) - The group's flagship cinema located at CentralWorld Shopping Complex.
- SFX Cinema (SFX) – "Boutique Chic" are more luxurious.
- SF Cinema (SFC) – Large multiplex theaters that are packaged with restaurants, bowling lanes and karaoke booths, usually taking up an entire floor in a shopping centre.
- Emprivé Cineclub - The group's luxurious flagship cinema located at Emporium Shopping Complex.

== Future projects ==
Expansion plans by SF Group includes:

- SF Cinema Rattanathibet (NorthVille) - To be located at Central NorthVille Opened on 3 July 2026

== Bowling, karaoke and gaming business ==
- SF City - An entertainment complex bundled with bowling alleys, karaoke rooms and video arcades.
- SF Strike Bowl - Bowling alley chain
- SF Music City - Karaoke rooms, with up to 100 in some locations, mostly tied to SF Cinema City and SF Strike Bowl locations

== Restaurants ==
- Eat @ W Restaurant chain with the first location on the 9th floor of SF World Cinema, CentralWorld Bangkok.

== Collectibles ==
For each ticket purchased at some SF Cinema and SFX branches, the purchaser receives a business-card-sized replica of a movie poster backed by a magnet. The magnets are collector's items and are sold second-hand by movie-memorabilia dealers.

== Digital Cinemas ==
SF Group offers digital cinema screening using Christie's CP 2K Digital Cinema Technology at the following locations:

- SF Cinema MBK Center (Cinema No. 2, 5, 7)
- SFX Cinema The Mall Ngamwongwan (Cinema No.9)
- SF Cinema The Mall Thapra (Cinema No. 3)
- SFX Central Lat Phrao (Cinema No. 6, 8)
- Emprive'Cineclub Emporium Sukhumvit (Cinema No.5)

SF Group also offers digital cinema screening using Barco's DLP Digital Cinema Technology bundled with Dolby Digital 3D Screening Capability at the following locations:

- SF World Cinema Central World (Cinema No. 8, No. 12, No. 14)
- SFX Cinema Central Lat Phrao (Cinema No. 7)
- SF Cinema MBK Center (Cinema No. 8)
- SFX Cinema Central Pattaya Beach (Cinema No. 5, No. 7)
- SF Cinema Citymall Sunee Tower Ubon Ratchathani (Cinema No.7)
- SF Cinema BigC Supercenter Samut Songkhram (Cinema No.3)

SF Group currently owns a total of 14 digital projectors which is by far the largest number to date in Thailand.

== Shopping Mall ==
- MAYA Lifestyle Center – The SF Group's new shopping centre, Located in Chiang Mai province.

== See also ==
- Cinema of Thailand
- List of cinemas in Thailand
