= List of largest shopping malls in Thailand =

List of Thailand's largest shopping malls

The following is a list of Thailand's largest shopping malls, ranked by gross leasable area (GLA).

#	Mall name	Location	GLA (m^{2})	Total (m^{2})	Stores	Anchor stores/Main features	Year opened
5	Central WestGate	Bang Yai district, Nonthaburi province	210,000	550,278	700+	Central Department Store, SB Design Square, IKEA, Westgate Cineplex, Westgate Hall	2015
2	Iconsiam	Bangkok	525,000	750,000	1000+	SIAM Takashimaya, JD Sports, Apple Store, TRUE Icon Hall, SookSiam, Dear Tummy, F Icon (Fitness First), Icon Cineconic (Imax), Toy R Us, H&M's, Louis Vuitton, Hermès	2018
11	CentralWorld	Bangkok	409,500	830,000	500	Central Department Store, Isetan, SF World Cinema, PowerBuy x B2S, SuperSports, Apple Store, Central Food Hall, SB Design Square, Toys R Us, Centerpoint at CentralWorld, TK Park	2002
3	Siam Paragon	Bangkok	300,000	495,000	270+	Paragon Department Store, Sea Life Bangkok Ocean World, Royal Paragon Hall, Paragon Cineplex, Gourmet Market	2005
12	Central Phuket	Phuket	185,000	420,000	500+	Central Department Store, SFX cinema, Central Food Hall, B2S, SuperSports, Powerbuy, OfficeMate, Tribhum, Aquria	2004
4	Central Korat	Nakhon Ratchasima	300,000	420,000	500+	Central Department Store, SFX cinema, Tops Market, B2S Think Space, SuperSports, Powerbuy, OfficeMate, Korat Hall	2016
5	Future Park Rangsit	Rangsit, Pathum Thani Province	295,000	490,000	900+	Central Department Store, Robinson Department Store, Tops Supermarket, Big C, Major Cineplex	1995
6	Fashion Island	Bangkok	350,000	350,000	300	Tops, B2S, Supersports, Power Buy, Officemate BigC Don Don Donki HomePro Harbor Land Major Cineplex	1995
6	Kad Suan Kaew (Permanently closed)	Chiang Mai	290,000	290,000	0	Used to have: Central Department Store, Tops Supermarket, Major Cineplex, Kadtheater, Large conference rooms, Still open: Lotus Hotel Pang Suan Kaew	1992
34	Central Pattaya	Pattaya	58,000	240,000	309	Central Department Store, SFX Cinema, Central Food Hall	2009
8	Mega Bangna	Samut Prakan	225,000	400,000	400+	IKEA, Central Department Store, Big C, HomePro, Mega Cineplex, Tops Market, PowerBuy	2012
9	The Mall Nakhon Ratchasima	Nakhon Ratchasima	220,000	350,000	400+	The Mall Department Store, Gourmet Market, Fitness First, Korat Cineplex, MCC Convention Hall, SB Design Square	2000
10	CentralPlaza Grand Rama 9	Bangkok	214,000	220,000	330	Robinson Department Store, SFX Cinema, Tops Market, Office Mate	2011
13	Seacon Square	Bangkok	180,000	500,000	400+	Robinson Department Store, Lotus's, Seacon Cineplex	1994
14	CentralPlaza Rama II	Bangkok	161,500		350	Central Department Store, Major Cineplex	2002
15	CentralPlaza Chaengwattana	Pak Kret district, Nonthaburi province	160,000	300,000	300+	Central Department Store, SFX Cinema	2008
16	Union Mall	Bangkok	150,000		1250		2006
17	CentralPlaza Bangna	Bangkok	113,000		300+	Central Department Store, Major Cineplex	1993
18	Esplande	Bangkok	105,000		20	Esplanade Cineplex, Tops Market	2006
19	CentralPlaza Rattanathibet	Nonthaburi	105,000		150	Robinson Department Store, SF Cinema, Baan & Beyond, Index Living Mall	2003
20	CentralPlaza Pinklao	Bangkok	104,500		315	Central Department Store, Tops, Major Cineplex	1995
7	CentralFestival Chiang Mai	Chiang Mai	250,000	250,000	250	Central Department Store, PowerBuy, SuperSports, Central Food Hall, Major Cineplex (IMAX)	2012
21	CentralPlaza Chonburi	Chonburi	100,000		200+	Robinson Department Store, Big C, SF Cinema	2009
22	CentralPlaza Rama III	Bangkok	98,000		335	Central Department Store	1997
23	Paradise Park	Bangkok	90,000	290,000	700	Paradise Cineplex, Villa Market, Homepro	2010
24	MBK Center	Bangkok	90,000	140,000	2500	SF Cinema, Animate Bangkok	1985
25	Zeer Rangsit	Pathum Thani	80,000				
26	CentralPlaza Ladprao	Bangkok	78,700	180,000	375+	Central Department Store, SFX Cinema	1982
27	Central Chiang Mai Airport	Chiang Mai	76,000	250,000	533	Robinson Department Store, Major Cineplex	1996
28	Promenada (Permanently closed)	Chiang Mai	75,000		0	Used to have: Rimping Supermarket, SF Cinema, Chi Chang, U-Hollywood, Sport World, Wine Connection	2012
29	Jungceylon	Phuket	75,000	250,000	300+	Robinson Department Store, Big C, SF Cinema	2007
30	CentralPlaza Surat Thani	Surat Thani	72,000	120,000	350+	Robinson Department Store, SF Cinema	2012
31	Terminal 21 Korat	Nakhon Ratchasima	70,000	240,000	600	SF Cinema, Foodland supermarket, Toys R Us	2015
32	Platinum Fashion Mall	Bangkok	60,000	N/A			2005
33	Saha-Thai Shopping Complex	Surat Thani	60,000	N/A		Sahathai Department Store	2011
35	CentralPlaza Phitsanulok	Phitsanulok	56,000	93,000		Robinson Department Store, Major Cineplex	2011
36	CentralPlaza Khon Kaen	Khon Kaen	50,000	200,000	250+	Robinson Department Store, SF Cinema	2009
37	Pratunam Center	Bangkok	50,000	N/A	2500		2005
38	Terminal 21	Bangkok	45,000	N/A	600	SF Cinema, Gourmet Market	2012
39	River City Shopping Complex	Bangkok	42,000	N/A	180~		1984
40	The Nine	Bangkok	35,000	N/A			2010
41	Robinson Lifestyle Trang	Trang	28,000	N/A		Robinson Department Store, SF Cinema	2010
42	Amarin Plaza	Bangkok	26,000	N/A	400		1986
43	Shibuya 19	Bangkok	N/A	28,000	500		2011
44	The Mall Lifestore Thapra	Bangkok	N/A	150,000	200+	The Mall Department Store, Gourmet market, Gourmet eat, Fashion&Accessories, Sports Mall, Watch galleria, Dining, Power Mall, BeTrend, Harbor Land, SF Cinema	1989
45	The Mall Lifestore Ngamwongwan	Nonthaburi	N/A	250,000	250+	The Mall Lifestore Department, Gourmet market, Gourmet Eat,	1991
46	The Mall Lifestore Bangkae	Bangkok	N/A	300,000	300+	The Mall Lifestore Department, Gourmet market, Gourmet Eat, Fashion&Accessories, Sports Mall, Watch galleria, Dining, Power Mall, BeTrend	1994
47	The Mall Lifestore Bangkapi	Bangkok	N/A	300,000	300+	The Mall Lifestore Department, Gourmet market, Gourmet Eat, Fashion&Accessories, Sports Mall, Watch galleria, Dining, Power Mall, BeTrend	1994
48	EMPORIUM	Bangkok	N/A	240,000	438+	Dining&Gourmet Market, Kid's and Family, Beauty&Wellness, Power Mall, Watch&Jewelry, Emprive Cineclub, Maison de style, Maison de style	1997
49	EMQUARTIER	Bangkok	N/A	250,000	233+	Dining&Gourmet Market, Gourmet Eat, Kid's and Family, Beauty&Wellness, Power Mall	2015
50	EMSPHERE	Bangkok	N/A	200,000	280+	Dining@Gourmet Market, Gourmet Eat, Fashion&Lifestyle, Enterainment, UOB Live	2023

== See also ==
- List of shopping malls in Bangkok
- List of shopping malls in Thailand
- List of the world's largest shopping malls
