= Central Group =

Thai multinational conglomerate

- Native name: กลุ่มเซ็นทรัล
- Type: Privately held
- Industry: Retail; property development; brand management; hospitality; food and beverage; digital lifestyle
- Founded: 1947; 79 years ago
- Founder: Tiang Chirathivat; Samrit Chirathivat
- Headquarters: Bangkok, Thailand
- Areas served: Asia; Indonesia; Japan; Malaysia; Maldives; Sri Lanka; Thailand; Vietnam; Europe; Denmark; Germany; Ireland; Italy; Netherlands; Switzerland; United Kingdom
- Key people: Tos Chirathivat (executive chairman and CEO)
- Products: Shopping centers; department stores; restaurants; hotels
- Owner: Chirathivat family
- Number of employees: 80,000 (2022)
- Subsidiaries: Central Retail; Central Pattana; Central Plaza Hotel
- Website: centralgroup.com

Central Group is a Thai multinational conglomerate founded by Tiang and Samrit Chirathivat in 1947, and still privately owned by the Chirathivat family as of 2025. Its publicly traded subsidiaries include Central Retail, Central Pattana (commercial real estate development), and Central Plaza Hotel (hospitality group and restaurant operator). Its privately held subsidiaries operate several European department stores, including those acquired from the former KaDeWe Group and Selfridges Group, and financial services.

== History ==
Founder Tiang emigrated from Hainan Island to Bangkok in 1925. He set up his first shop in the Thon Buri district on the outskirts of Bangkok across the Chao Phraya River from the city center. He moved across the Chao Phraya River to a location near the grand Oriental Hotel (now the Mandarin Oriental), where he opened a store with his eldest son, Samrit, in 1947. In 1956, the family opened Central Department Store, the biggest department store in Thailand at that time, in Wang Burapa district, Phra Nakhon, Bangkok. The company's property development arm, Central Pattana, was founded in 1980, and opened its first shopping centre, CentralPlaza Ladprao in Chatuchak District, Bangkok, in 1983. Besides expansion through physical presence in the Bangkok retail space, Central Group has in recent years built an online presence among ASEAN e-tailers and a strong presence of luxury department store collection in Europe.

== Public subsidiaries ==
=== Central Retail ===
List of Central Retail department stores
Name	Year founded	Notes
Big C	1993	
Central Department Store	1927	One location in Indonesia
Go!		
Lanchi Mart		
Ploen Shopping Mall	2027	
Riva Shopping Mall	2028	
Robins	2014	Vietnamese rebranding of Robinsons Department Store
Robinson Department Store	1979	Acquired by Central in 1995
Thai Watsadu	2010	
Tops	1996	
Zen	1989	Rebranded to Central in 2019

=== Central Pattana ===
List of Central Pattana properties
City	Name	Year opened	Gross floor area
Ayutthaya	Central Ayutthaya	2021	68,000 m^{2} (730,000 ft^{2})
Bangkok	Central Bangna	2001	500,000 m^{2} (5,400,000 ft^{2})
Bangkok	CenTRal cENtrAL	2027	150,000 m^{2} (1,600,000 ft^{2})
Bangkok	Central EastVille	2015	150,000 m^{2} (1,600,000 ft^{2})
Bangkok	Central Embassy	2014	1,000,000 m^{2} (11,000,000 ft^{2})
Bangkok	Central GR9	2011	214,000 m^{2} (2,300,000 ft^{2})
Bangkok	Central Ladprao	1982	310,000 m^{2} (3,300,000 ft^{2})
Bangkok	Central Park	2025	130,000 m^{2} (1,400,000 ft^{2})
Bangkok	Central Pinklao	1995	317,000 m^{2} (3,410,000 ft^{2})
Bangkok	Central Rama 2	2002	273,000 m^{2} (2,940,000 ft^{2})
Bangkok	Central Rama 3	1997	188,000 m^{2} (2,020,000 ft^{2})
Bangkok	Central Ramindra	1993	86,000 m^{2} (930,000 ft^{2})
Bangkok	CentralWorld	2002	830,000 m^{2} (8,900,000 ft^{2})
Bangkok	Marche Thonglor	2023	62,000 m^{2} (670,000 ft^{2})
Bangkok	The Central Phaholyothin	2026	460,000 m^{2} (5,000,000 ft^{2})
Bangkok	The Esplanade Ratchada	2021	105,000 m^{2} (1,130,000 ft^{2})
Chanthaburi	Central Chanthaburi	2022	75,953 m^{2} (817,550 ft^{2})
Chiang Mai	Central Chiangmai Airport	1996	173,000 m^{2} (1,860,000 ft^{2})
Chiang Mai	Central Chiangmai	2013	260,000 m^{2} (2,800,000 ft^{2})
Chiang Rai	Central Chiangrai	2011	110,000 m^{2} (1,200,000 ft^{2})
Chonburi	Central Chonburi	2009	156,000 m^{2} (1,680,000 ft^{2})
Chonburi	Central Si Racha	2021	71,000 m^{2} (760,000 ft^{2})
Khon Kaen	Central Khonkaen	2009	200,000 m^{2} (2,200,000 ft^{2})
Khon Kaen	Central Khonkaen Campus	2026	62,000 m^{2} (670,000 ft^{2})
Ko Samui	Central Samui	2014	90,000 m^{2} (970,000 ft^{2})
Krabi	Central Krabi	2025	86,600 m^{2} (932,000 ft^{2})
Lampang	Central Lampang	2012	110,000 m^{2} (1,200,000 ft^{2})
Nakhon Pathom	Central Nakhon Pathom	2024	126,000 m^{2} (1,360,000 ft^{2})
Nakhon Pathom	Central Salaya	2014	185,500 m^{2} (1,997,000 ft^{2})
Nakhon Ratchasima	Central Korat	2017	233,000 m^{2} (2,510,000 ft^{2})
Nakhon Sawan	Central Nakhon Sawan	2024	133,300 m^{2} (1,435,000 ft^{2})
Nakhon Si Thammarat	Central Nakhon Si	2016	125,000 m^{2} (1,350,000 ft^{2})
Nonthaburi	Central Chaengwattana	2008	310,000 m^{2} (3,300,000 ft^{2})
Nonthaburi	Central NorthVille	2003	210,000 m^{2} (2,300,000 ft^{2})
Nonthaburi	Central WestGate	2015	352,000 m^{2} (3,790,000 ft^{2})
Nonthaburi	Central WestVille	2023	93,000 m^{2} (1,000,000 ft^{2})
Pattaya	Central Marina Outlet	1995	70,000 m^{2} (750,000 ft^{2})
Pattaya	Central Pattaya	2009	210,000 m^{2} (2,300,000 ft^{2})
Phitsanulok	Central Phitsanulok	2011	100,000 m^{2} (1,100,000 ft^{2})
Phuket	Central Phuket	2018	400,000 m^{2} (4,300,000 ft^{2})
Rayong	Central Rayong	2015	155,000 m^{2} (1,670,000 ft^{2})
Samut Prakan	Central Village Luxury Outlet	2019	80,000 m^{2} (860,000 ft^{2})
Samut Prakan	Mega Bangna	2021	500,000 m^{2} (5,400,000 ft^{2})
Samut Sakhon	Central Mahachai	2017	131,250 m^{2} (1,412,800 ft^{2})
Shah Alam, Malaysia	Central i-City (Note: Central i-City is the only CPN-owned mall that does not feature Central Department Store or any Central Group retail stores.)	2019	259,000 m^{2} (2,790,000 ft^{2})
Songkhla	Central Hatyai	2013	295,000 m^{2} (3,180,000 ft^{2})
Surat Thani	Central Suratthani	2012	130,000 m^{2} (1,400,000 ft^{2})
Ubon Ratchathani	Central Ubon	2013	186,284 m^{2} (2,005,140 ft^{2})
Udon Thani	Central Udon	2009	250,000 m^{2} (2,700,000 ft^{2})

=== Central Plaza Hotel ===
Central Group owns and manages visitor accommodation at all major Thai tourist destinations and around the world under own banners as well as international brands. Hotels cover every segment from luxury to economy. Central’s own brands comprise Centara Reserve, Centara Grand, Centara Boutique Collection, Centara, Centra by Centara and Cosi, while internationally branded hotels include Park Hyatt Bangkok and Hilton Pattaya. In the Maldives, Centara Grand is opening its fourth location on February 1, 2025. In Japan, Central Group is a co-investor in StayFactory Hotel Group, whose brands include Hotel Hillarys, Hotel Relief, and Hotel Stork. In Switzerland, Central Group has also comprised Central Hotel Zurich company and Globus supermarket.

Central Group has also pioneered restaurant chains in Thailand, and operates well-known local, regional, and international food brands such as Mister Donut, KFC, Auntie Anne’s, Pepper Lunch, Chabuton, The Terrace, Yoshinoya, Ootoya, Tenya, Katsuya and Fezt.

== Private subsidiaries ==
=== European luxury stores ===
List of Central Group department stores in Europe
Country	Name	Year founded	Year acquired	Notes
Denmark	Illum	1891	2013	
Germany	Alsterhaus	1912	2015	
Germany	Kaufhaus des Westens	1907	2015	
Germany	Oberpollinger	1905	2015	
Italy	La Rinascente	1865	2011	
Ireland	Arnotts	1843	2022	Joint venture with the Saudi Arabian Public Investment Fund
Ireland	Brown Thomas	1848	1983	Joint venture with the Saudi Arabian Public Investment Fund
Netherlands	De Bijenkorf	1870	2022	Joint venture with the Saudi Arabian Public Investment Fund
Switzerland	Globus	1907	2020	
United Kingdom	Selfridges	1908	2022	Joint venture with the Saudi Arabian Public Investment Fund

=== Financial services ===
One of Central Group's aspirations towards the New Central New Economy strategy is to create convenience for both merchants and consumers with financial services and Fintech, with the ultimate goal of a cashless society in Thailand.

- Credit – The1 credit card, sales finance, personal loans
- Payment – gift cards, e-payments, e-wallets
- Insurance brokerage – motor, health, personal accident, property & casualty, group life

== Gallery ==
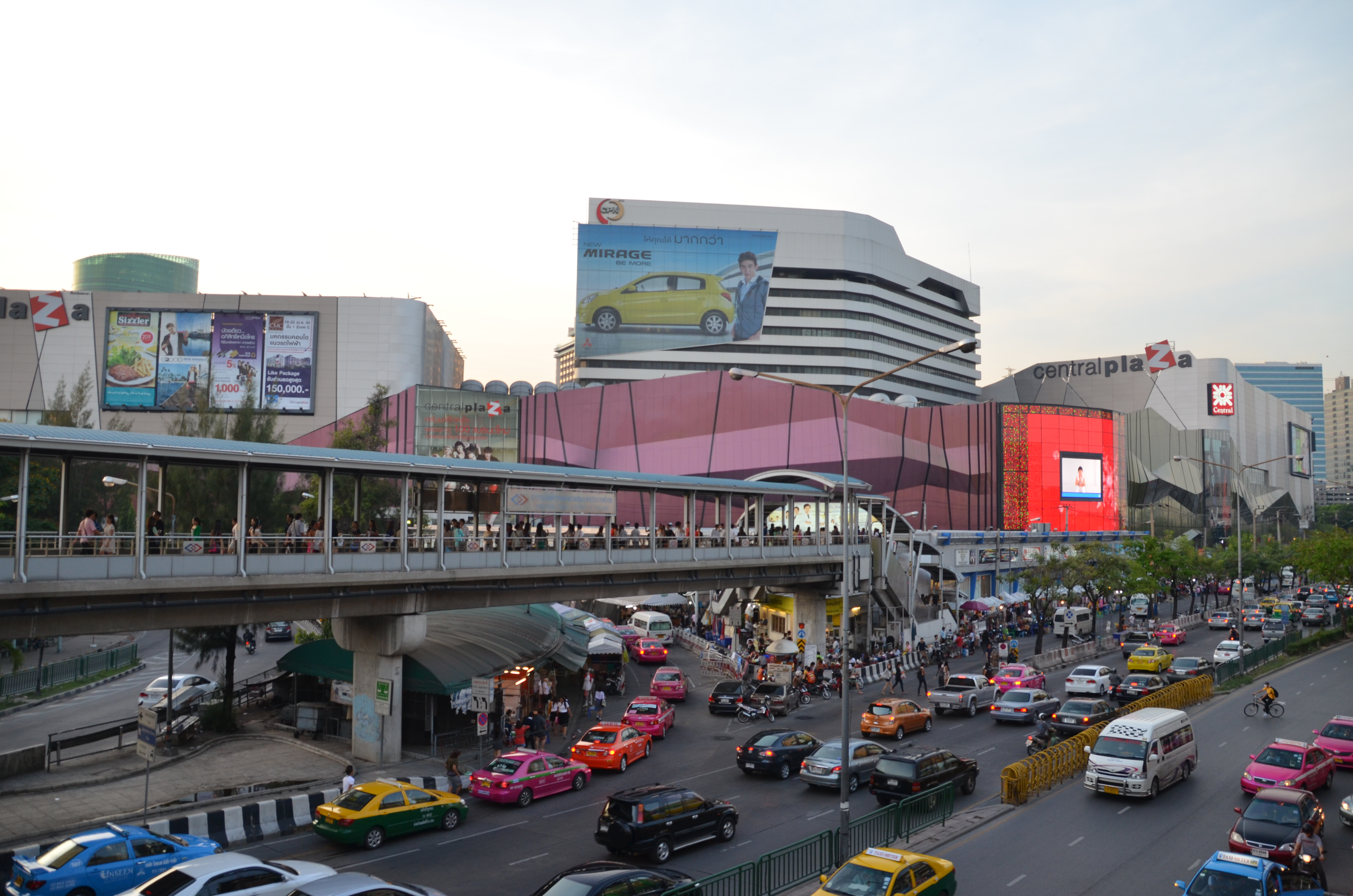
Central Ladprao, CPN's first one stop service shopping mall

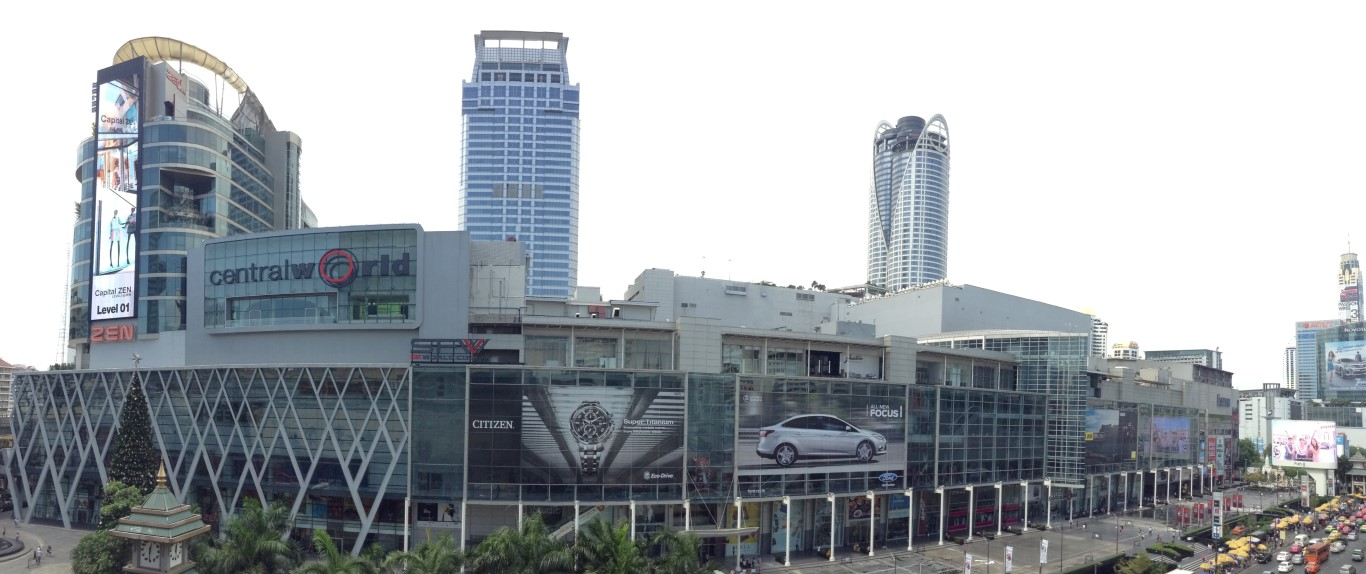
CentralWorld, the first super-regional mall in Bangkok

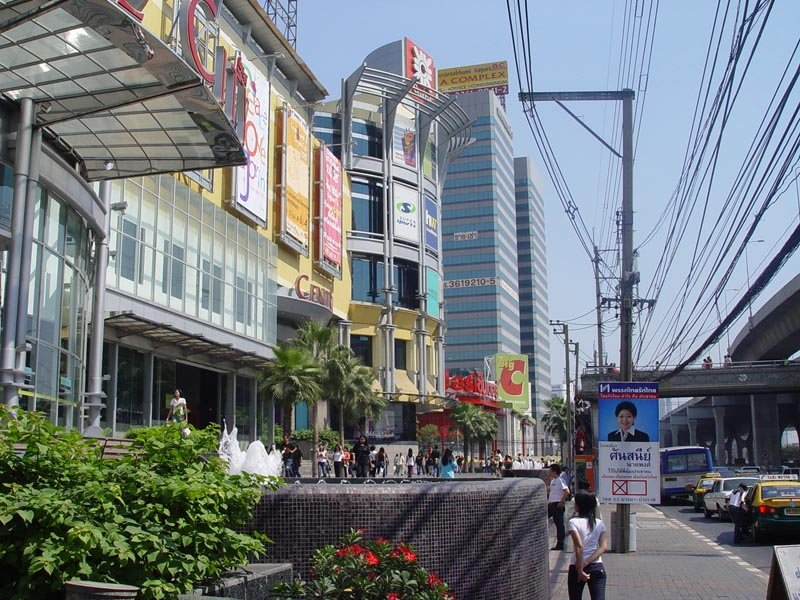
Old façade, Central Bangna (1993–2015)

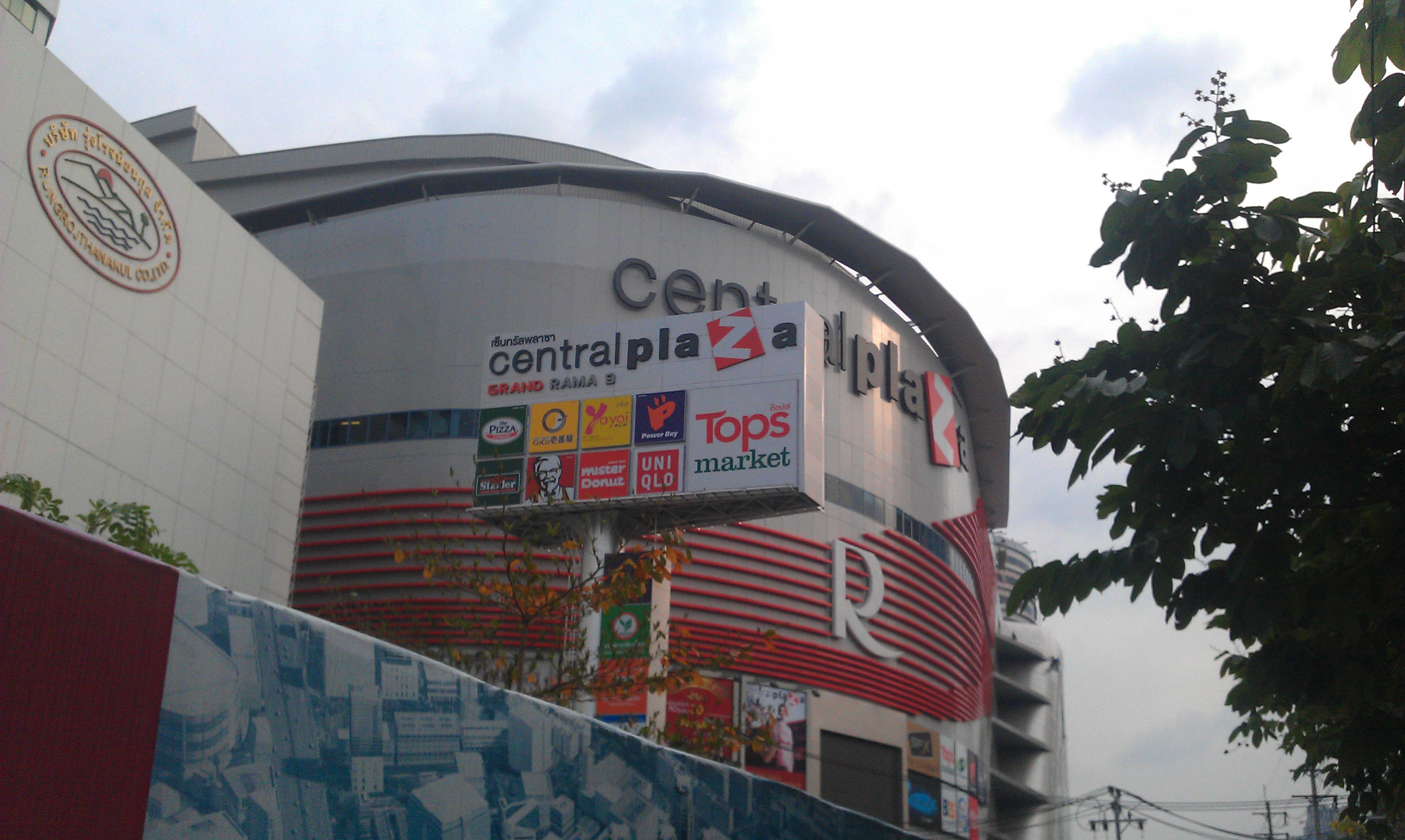
Central Rama 9

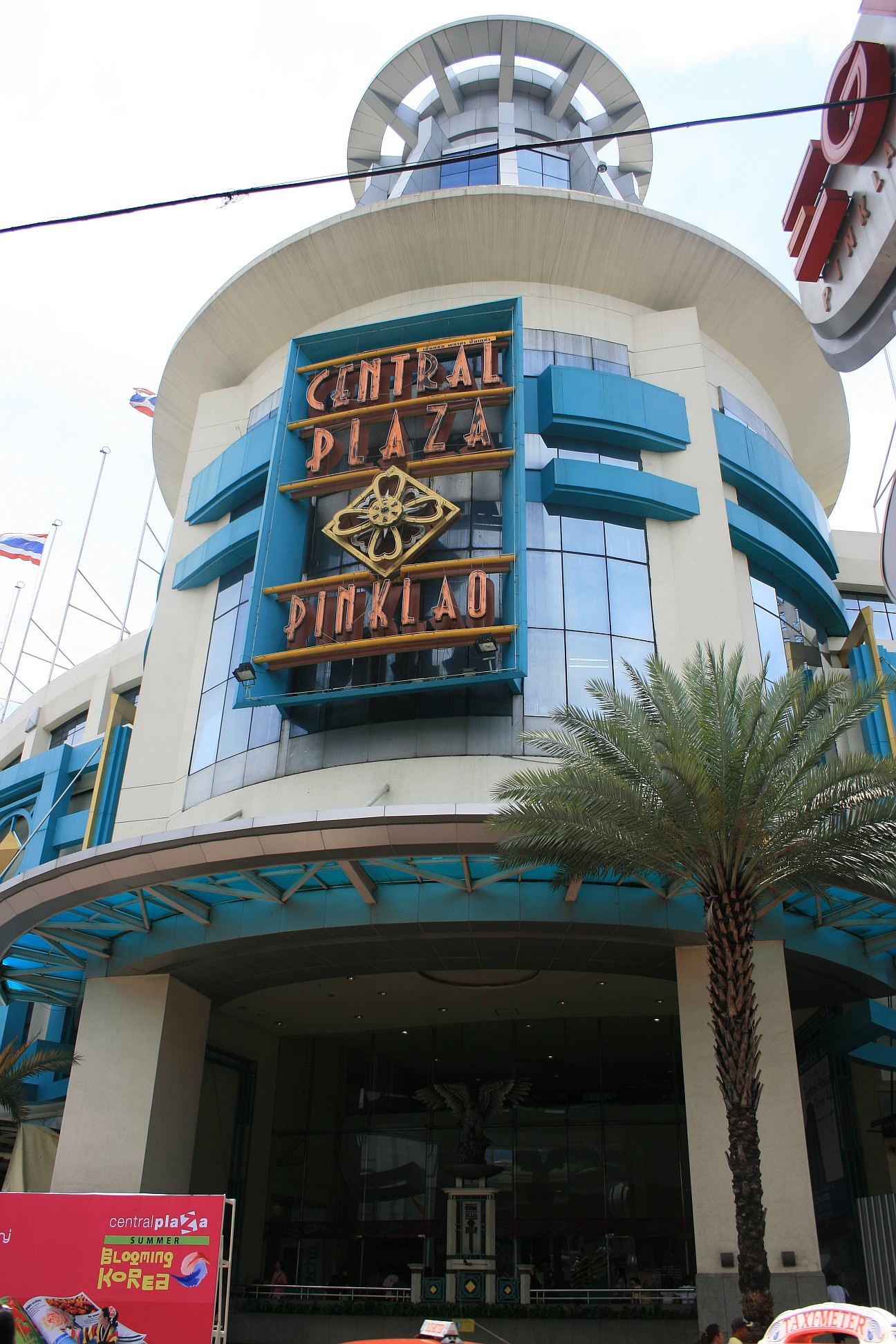
Old façade, Central Pinklao (1995–2010)

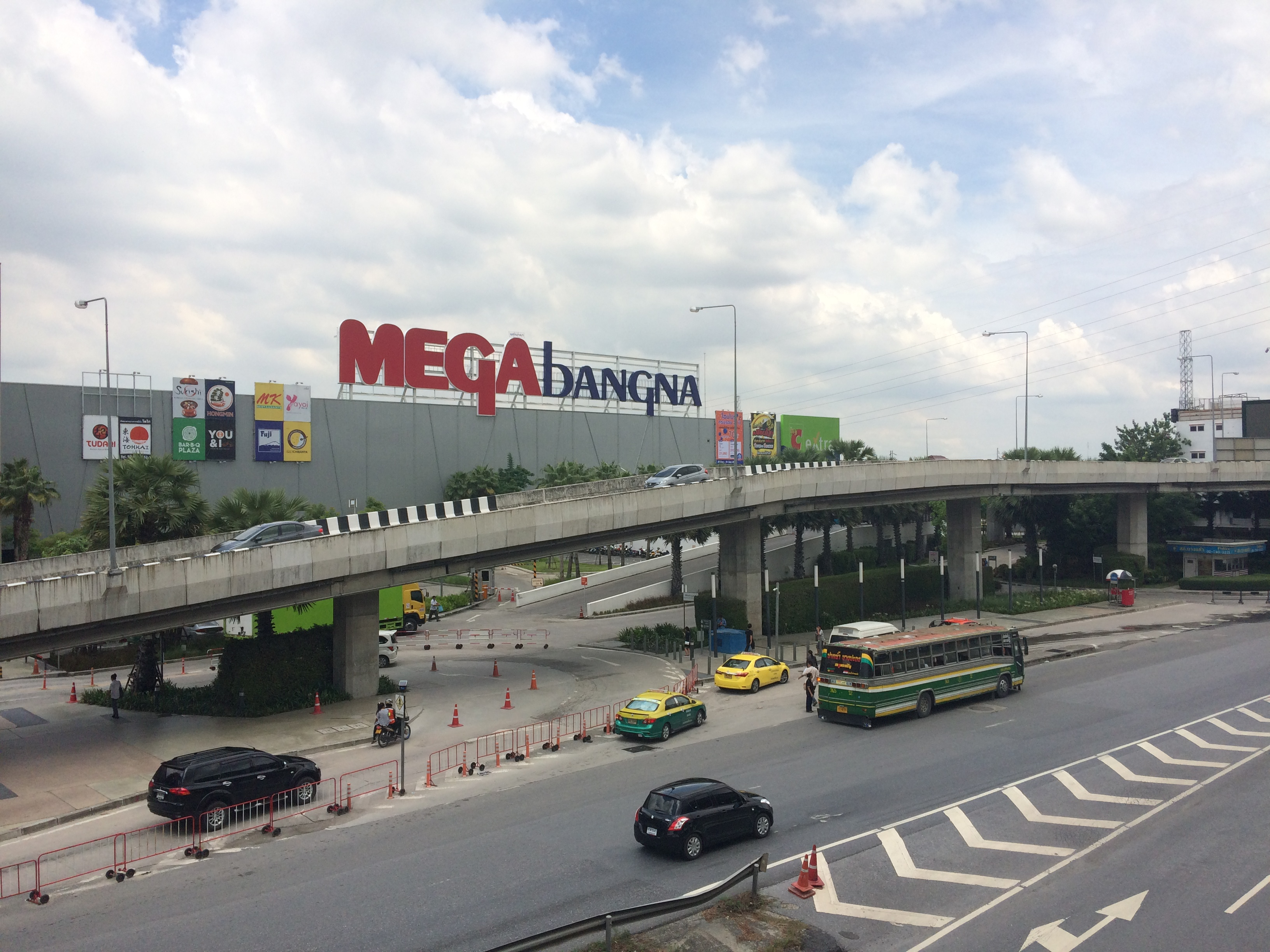
Mega Bangna

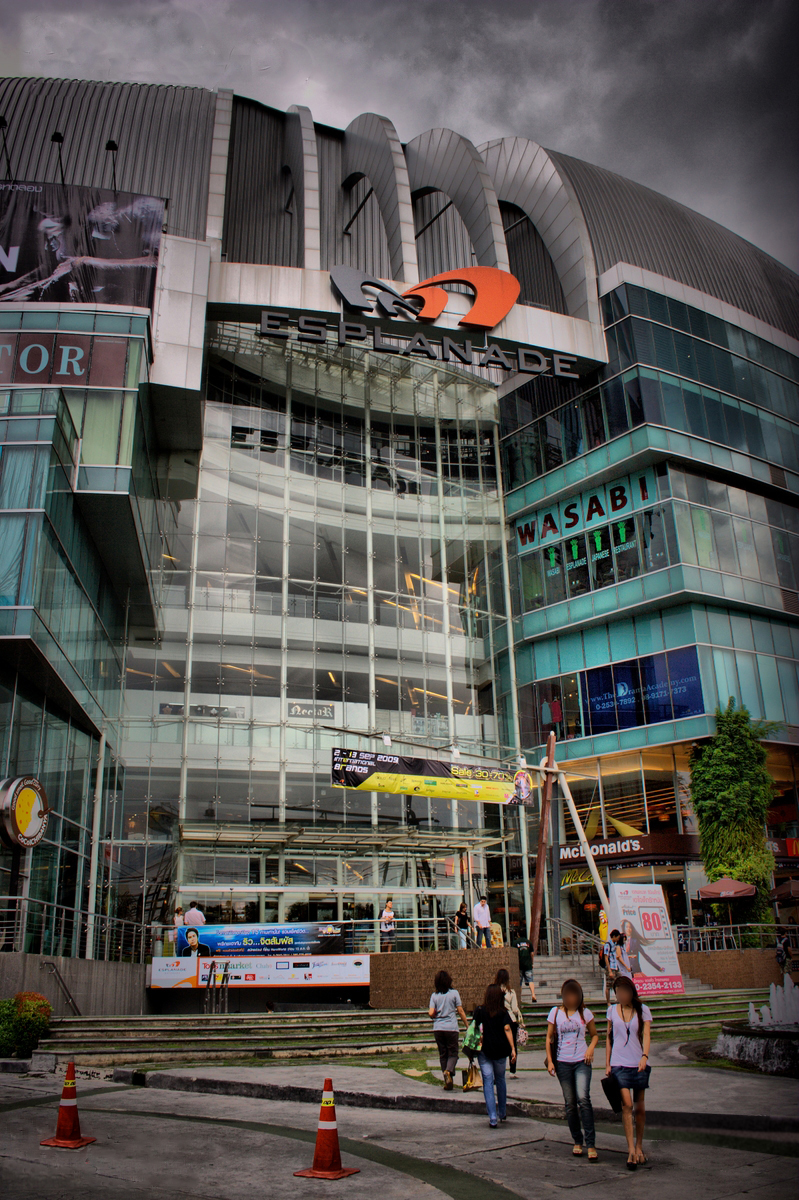
The Esplanade, Bangkok

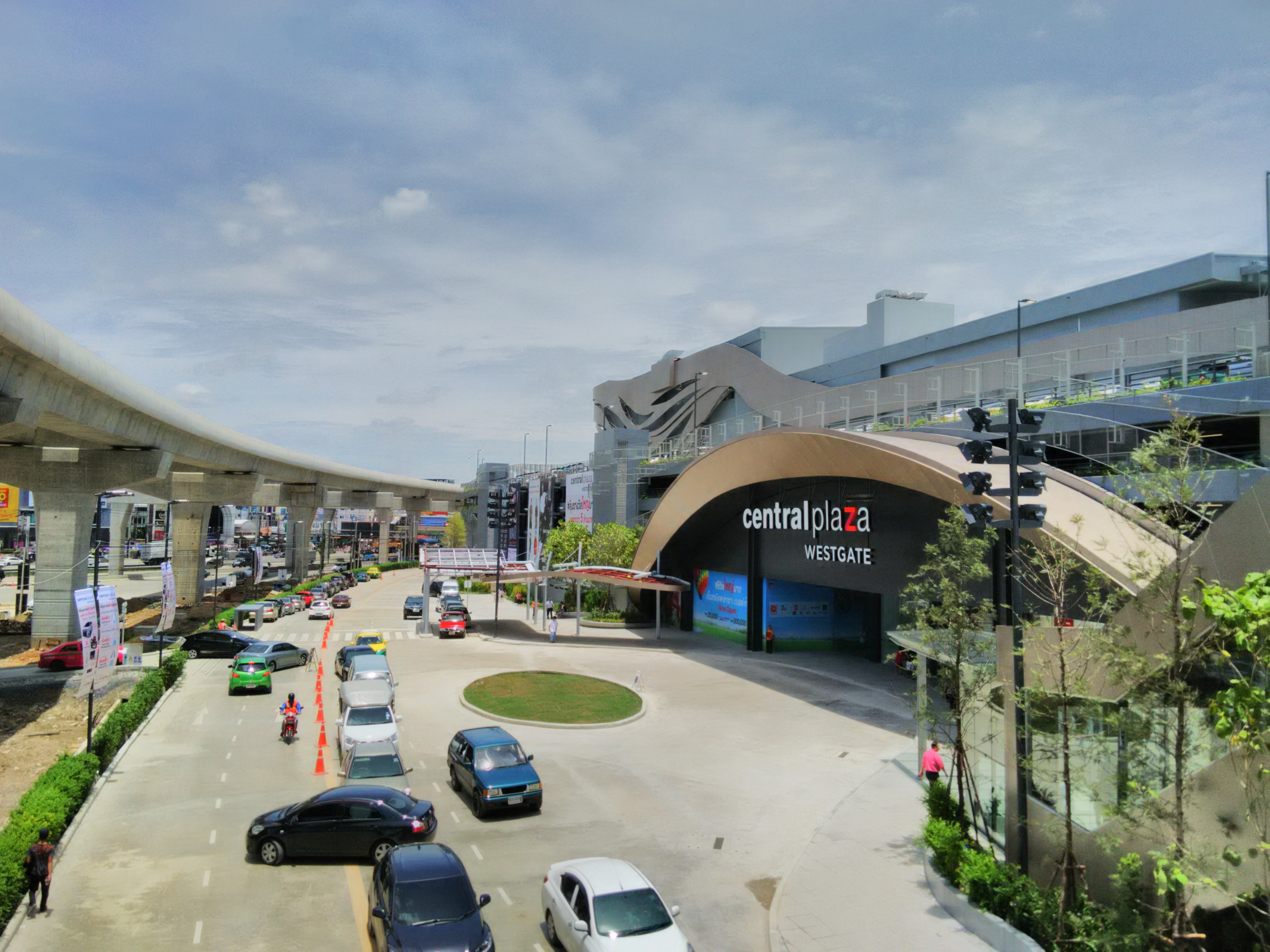
Central WestGate

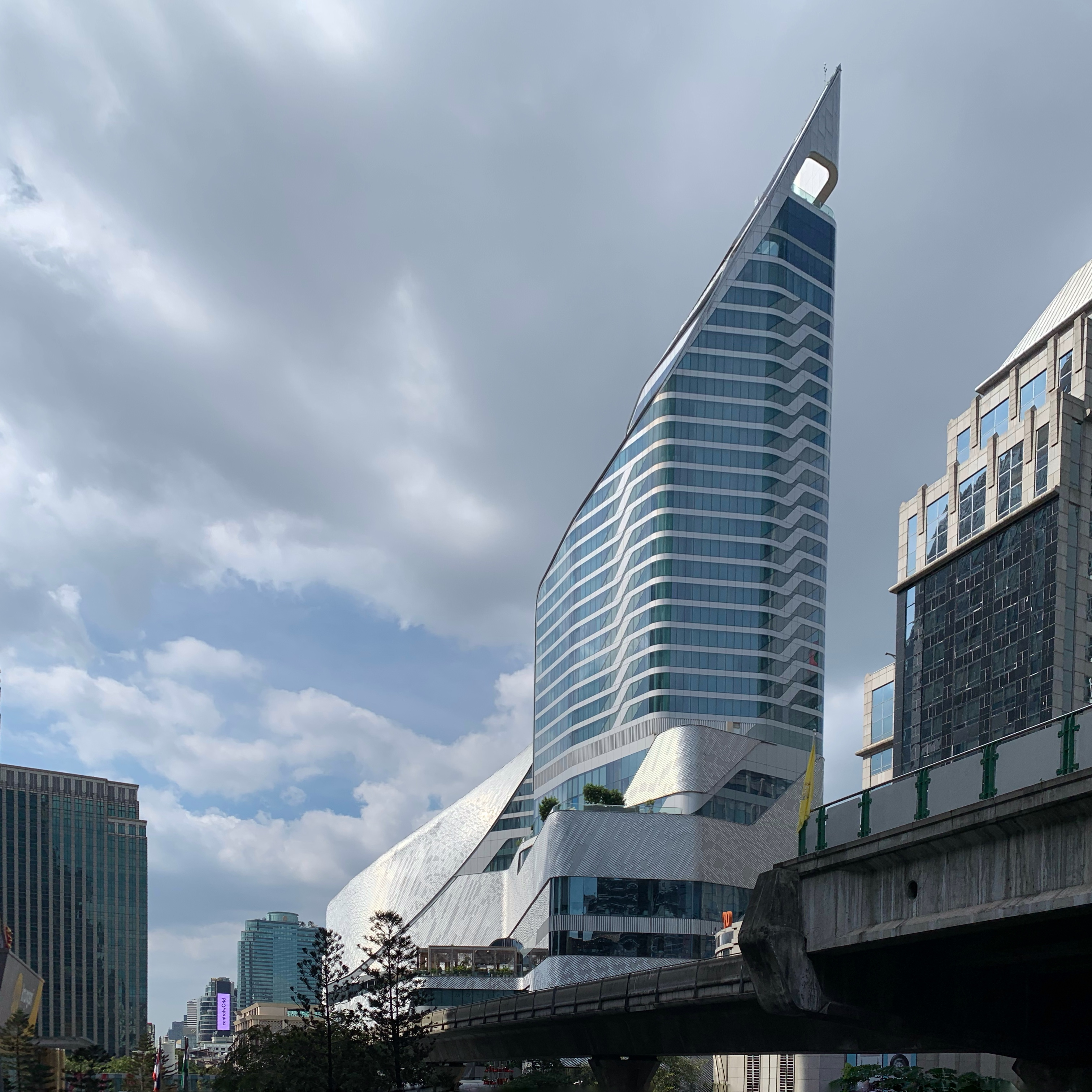
Central Embassy

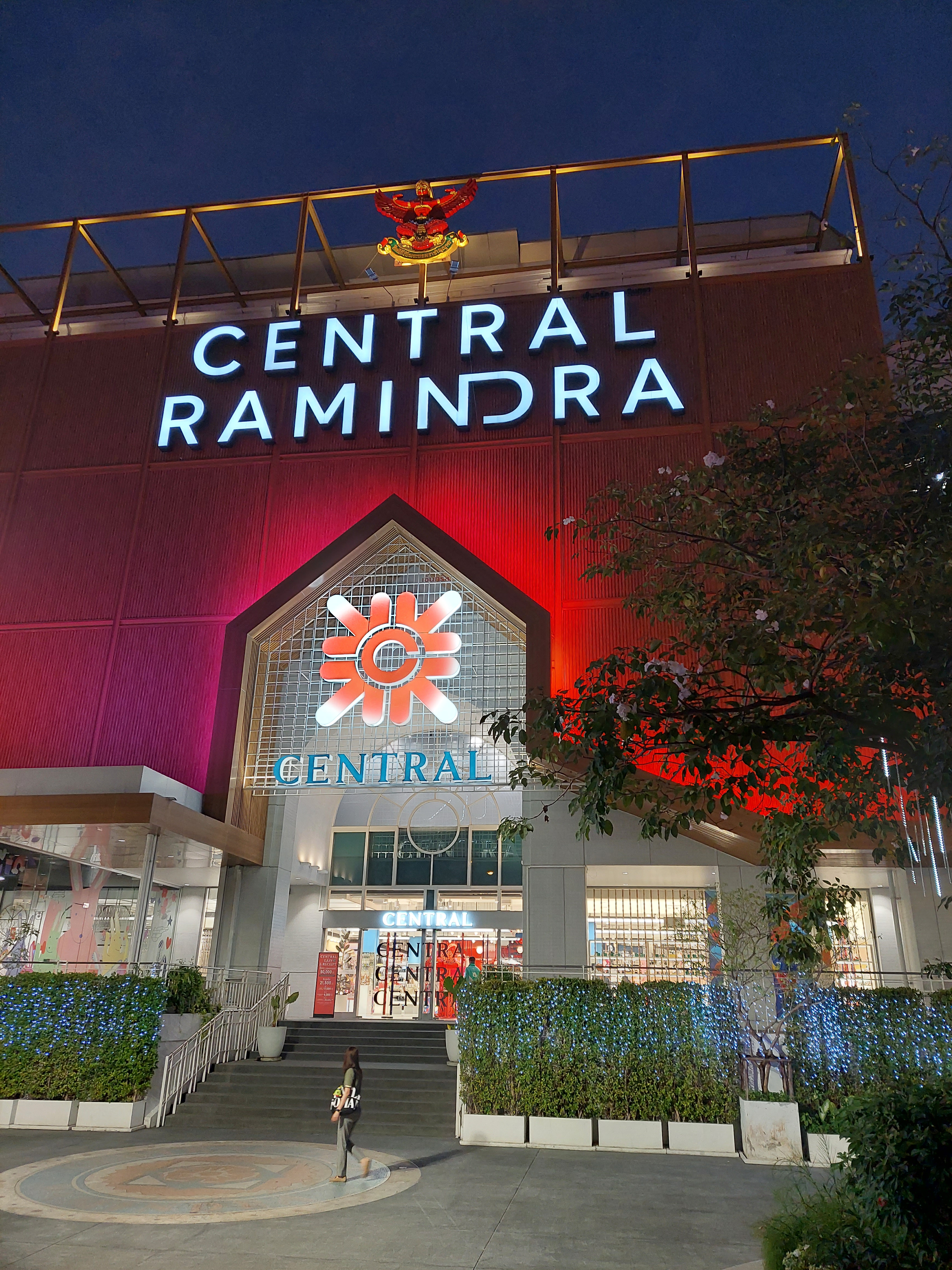
Central Ramindra

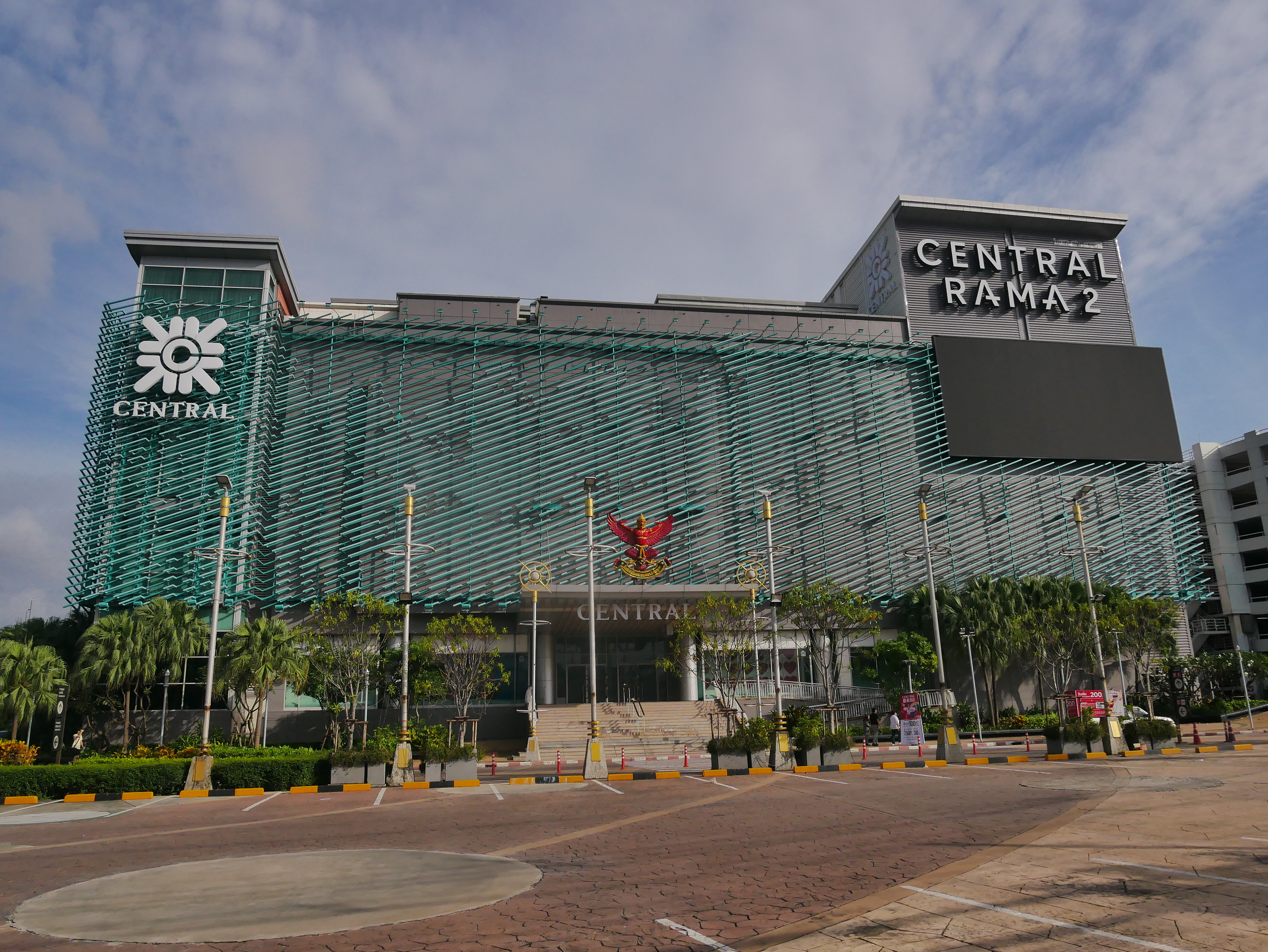
Central Rama 2

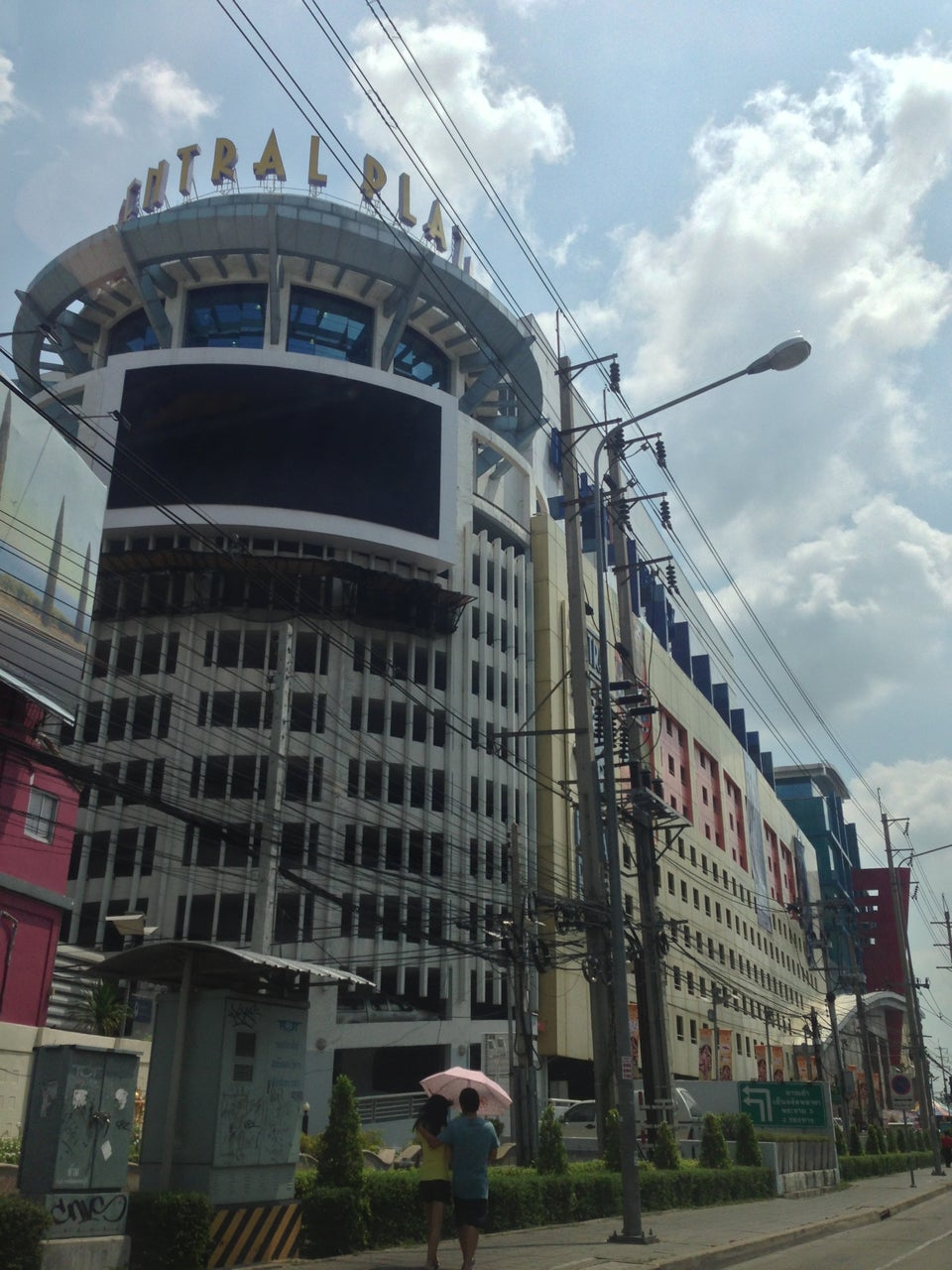
Old façade, Central Rama 3 (1997-2017)

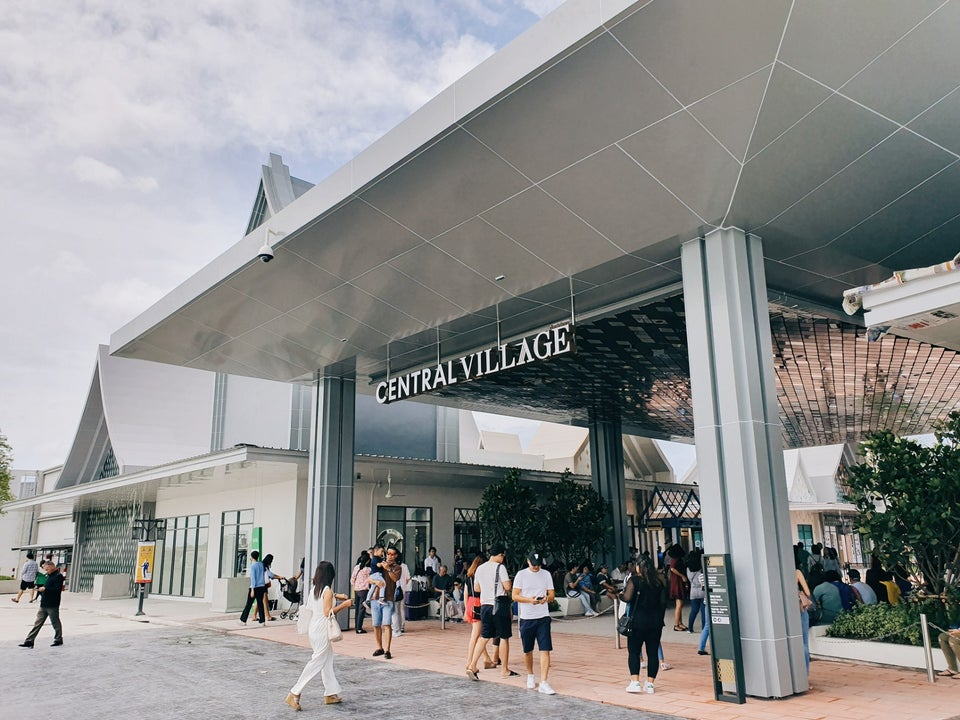
Central Village Luxury Outlet
