= Central Suratthani =

Central Suratthani เซ็นทรัล สุราษฎร์ธานี
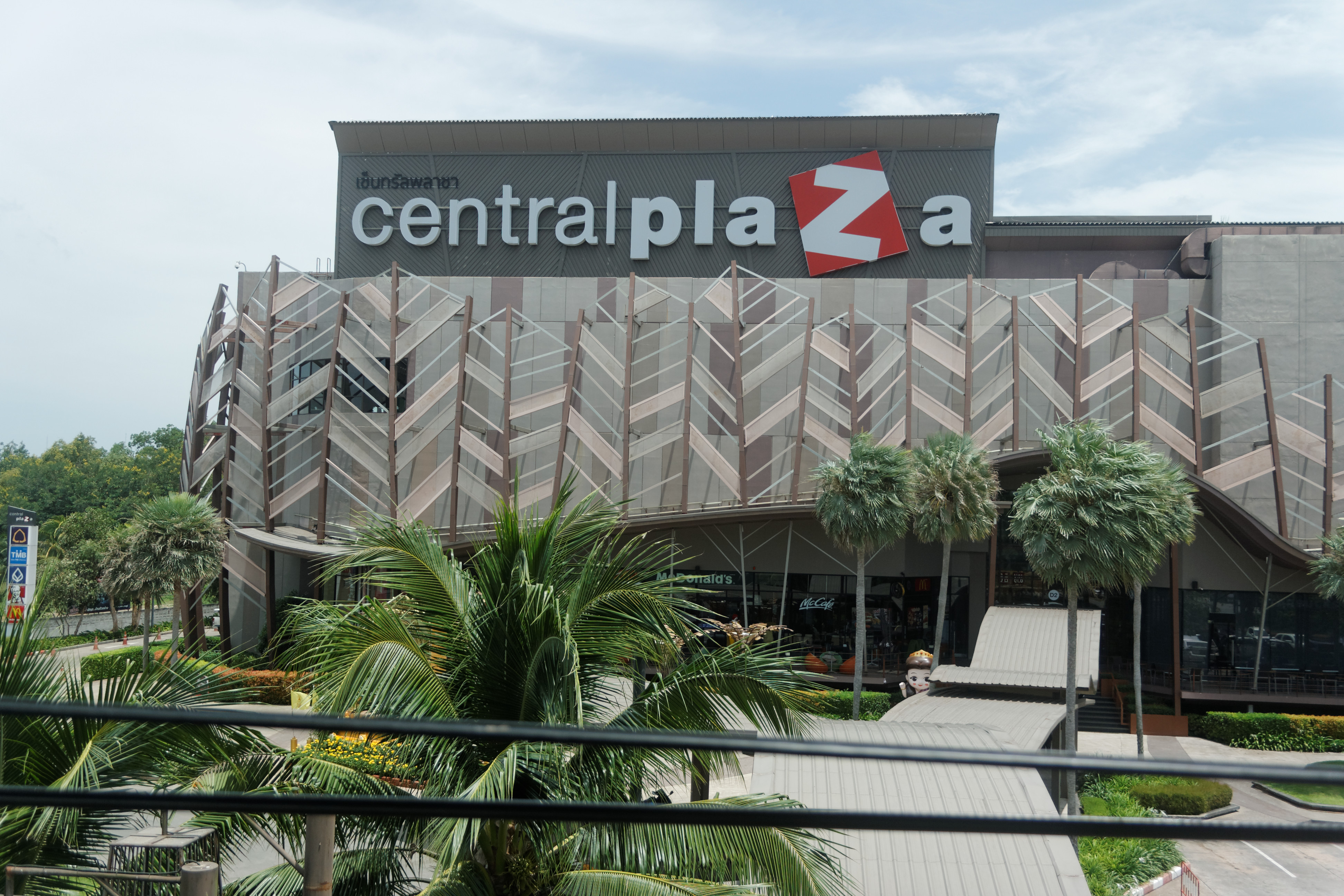
- Central Suratthani front view
- Location: Wat Pradu, Mueang Surat Thani, Surat Thani, Thailand
- Coordinates: 9.112012°N 99.301661°E
- Opened: October 11, 2012
- Developer: Central Pattana
- Owner: Central Pattana
- Num. of stores: 160
- Floor area: 25,100 square metres (270,000 sq ft)
- Floors: 4
- Website: web.archive.org/web/20121015021046/http://www.centralplaza.co.th:80/suratthani/ www.robinson.co.th

Central Suratthani (Thai: เซ็นทรัล สุราษฎร์ธานี) (previously known as CentralPlaza Suratthani) is a shopping mall in Surat Thani Province, Thailand.

== Overview ==
On a 62rai (10hectare) plot, the new CentralPlaza Surat Thani will be the largest ever retail project developed by Central Pattana in the Southern Thailand. The shopping mall was inaugurated on 11 October 2012.

It expected to create between 3,000 and 4,000 jobs and generate Bt4 billion to Bt5 billion in yearly income for its tenants. It is the first CentralPlaza of Central Group in Southern Thailand. CPN is investing Bt1.9 billion in the new 120,000 square meter lifestyle center in Surat Thani.

CentralPlaza Surat Thani complex would cater to a million local residents who live within a 90kilometre radius, and another 1.5 million visiting the province every year. It is also expected to serve 2.8 million consumers from surrounding provinces such as Nakhon Si Thammarat, Ranong, Krabi, Chumphon and Phang Nga.

The company also plans to develop a hotel on the land next to CentralPlaza Surat Thani in the future to support visitors of the convention centre in the shopping mall.

Explained that in the initial phase the shopping centre would occupy about 40 rai, and in the second phase it would expand into a hybrid complex of indoor and outdoor shops

== Anchor ==
- Robinson Department Store
- Tops
- SF Cinema 7 Cinemas
- B2S
- Supersports
- Power Buy
- Officemate
- Food Park
- Suratthani Hall
- Jetts Fitness
- Escent Ville Suratthani

== See also ==
- List of shopping malls in Thailand
- List of largest shopping malls in Thailand
