= Chonburi (disambiguation) =

Chonburi is the capital of Chonburi Province, Thailand.

Chonburi may also refer to:

- Chonburi province, a province of Thailand
- Mueang Chonburi district, the capital district of the province
- Chonburi F.C., a Thai professional football club based in the city of Chonburi
- Chonburi Stadium, a multi-use stadium in Chonburi Province, Thailand

== See also ==
- CentralPlaza Chonburi, a shopping and entertainment complex
