= Zen (department store) =

Defunct Thai department store chain

ZEN Department Store เซน ดีพาร์ทเมนท์ สโตร์; 先
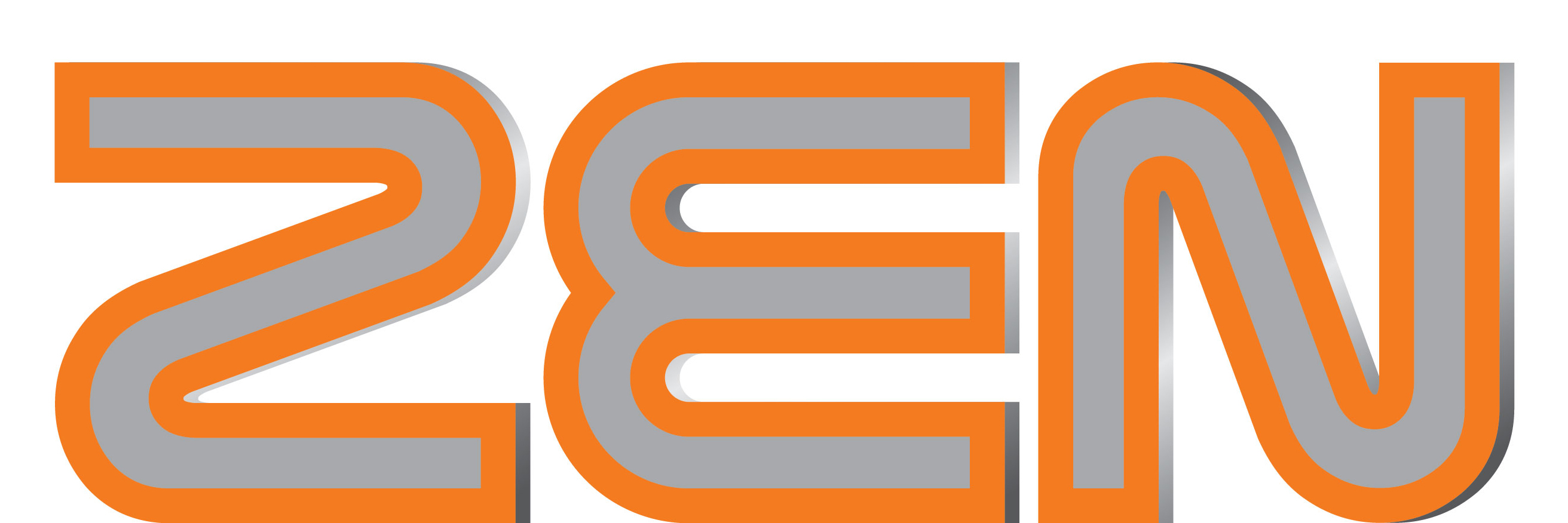
- Company type: Private
- Industry: Retail
- Genre: Department store
- Founded: 1989
- Founder: Central Group
- Defunct: 2019
- Fate: Folded into Central
- Headquarters: Pathum Wan, Bangkok, Thailand
- Owner: Central Group

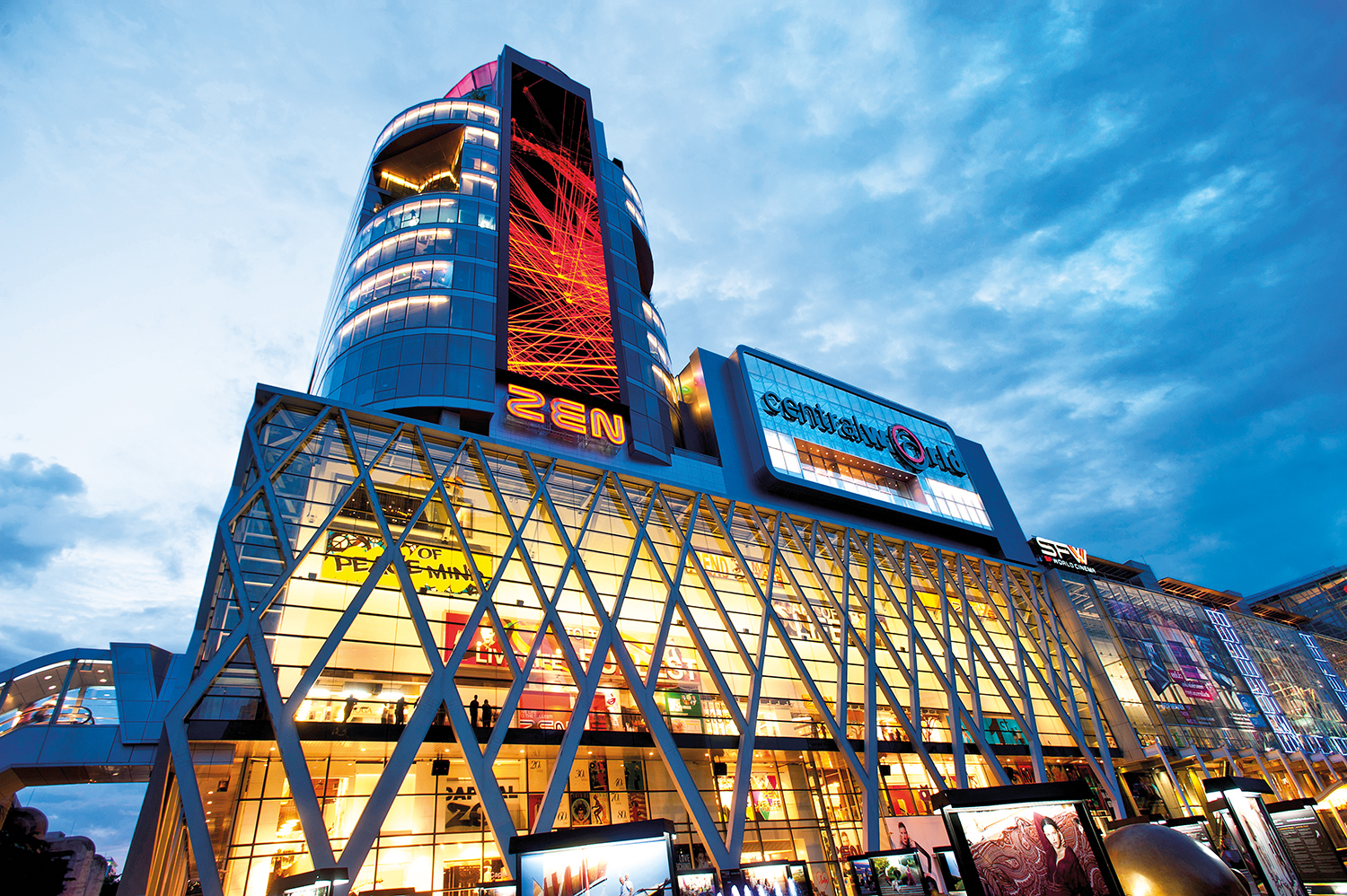
Zen department store, Bangkok

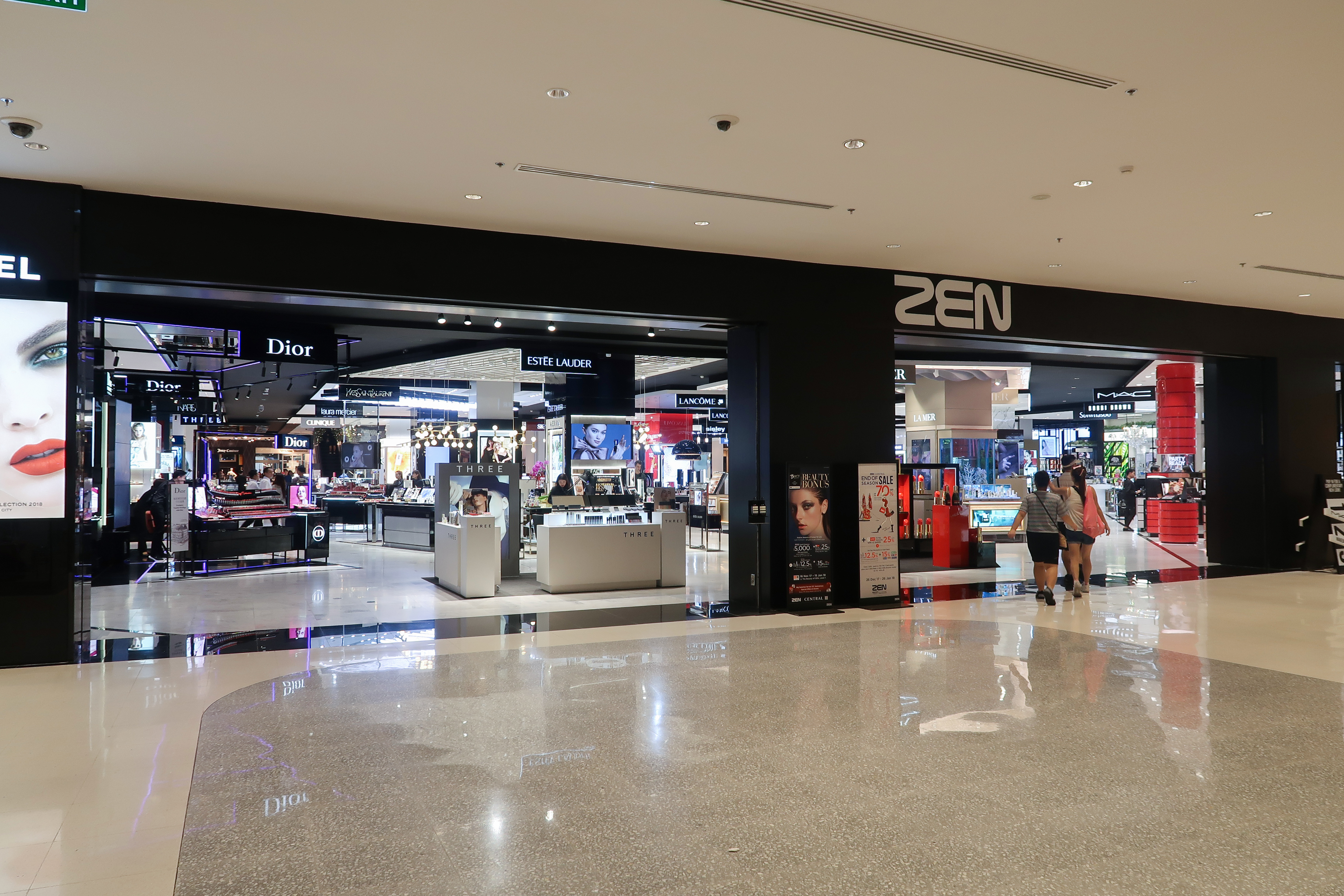
Zen level 1 entrance

ZEN (Thai: เซน ดีพาร์ทเมนท์ สโตร์; Simplified Chinese: 先; Pinyin: Xiān) was a chain of two Thai luxury department stores owned by the Central Group, with branches in Thailand and China. The final store was rebranded as Central Department Store in 2019.

== Overview ==
ZEN was launched in 1989 as an anchor tenant of the CentralWorld shopping mall in the Pathum Wan District of Bangkok, Thailand.

A second branch was opened in April 2011 in Shenyang, China, as part of the Central Group's planned 18 billion baht expansion into the country. This branch closed in 2013.

In 2018, three floors of the Zen department store in Bangkok were renovated, with a new beauty zone being introduced on the first floor. The fourth and fifth floors, encompassing 11,000 square meters, were remodeled to accommodate 300 new brands and fashion shops.

In 2019, the remaining location in Bangkok was renamed Central Department Store, bringing an end to the ZEN brand.

== Branches ==
=== Bangkok ===
- Ratchaprasong (CentralWorld) – rebranded in 2019
- Srinagarindra (Seacon Square) – rebranded to Robinson

=== China ===
- Shenyang – opened 2011, closed 2013

== See also ==
- The Mall Group
