= Central Rama 3 =

Central Rama III
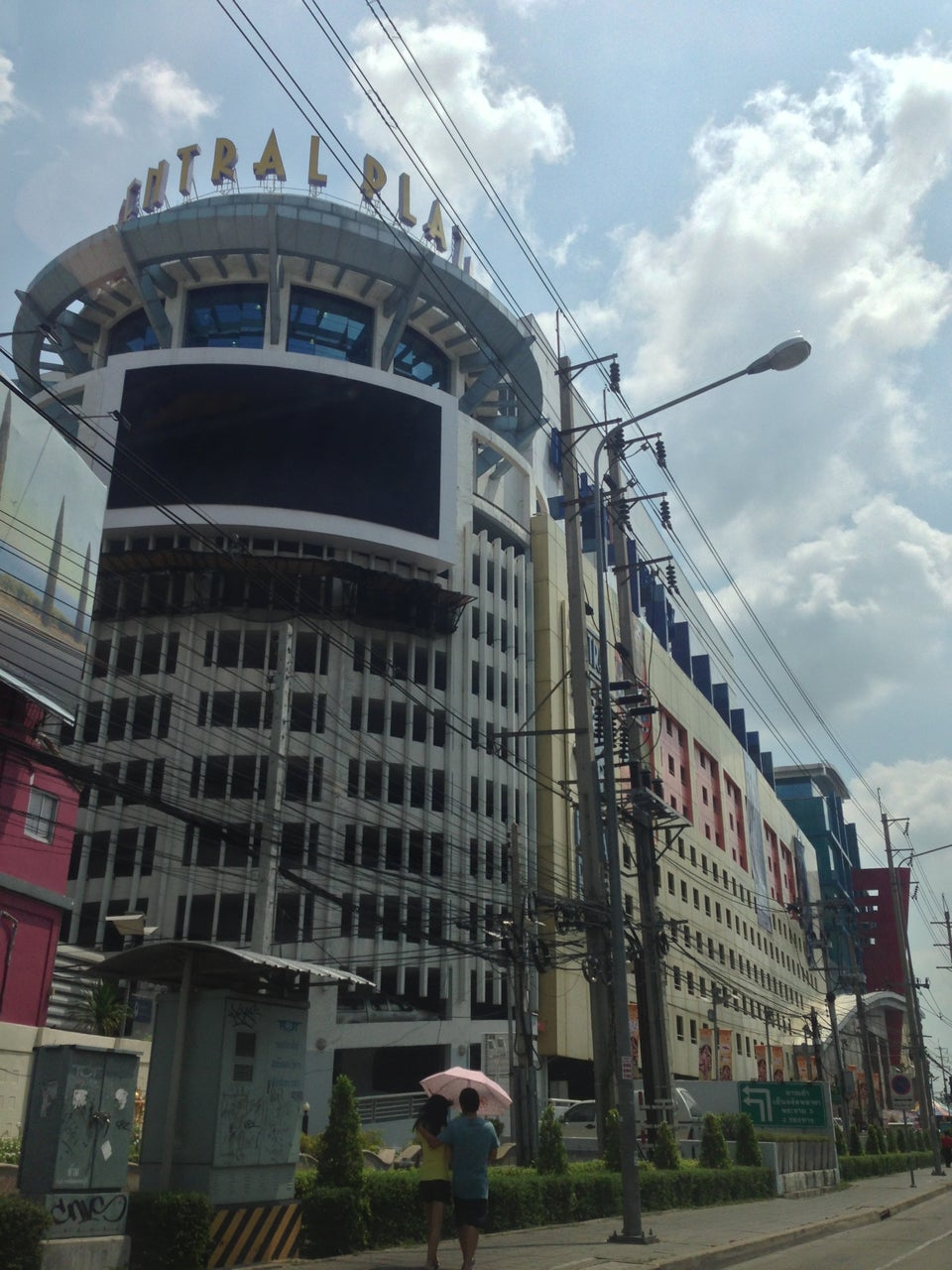
- CentralPlaza Rama III before renovation in 2017
- Location: Yan Nawa, Bangkok, Thailand
- Coordinates: 13.6976°N 100.5378°E
- Opened: October 10, 1997
- Developer: Central Pattana
- Manager: Songsiri Manonunti
- Owner: Central Pattana
- Num. of stores: 301
- Floor area: 58,805 square metres (632,970 sq ft)
- Floors: 7
- Parking: 2,300
- Website: web.archive.org/web/20091218095847/http://www.centralplaza.co.th:80/

Central Rama III is a shopping center located on Ratchadapisek Road in Yan Nawa District, Bangkok, Thailand. The mall opened in 10 October 1997 and is one of Central Group's largest shopping centers.

== Overview ==
The shopping center has a total of nine floors with two basement floors included. The shopping center provides a mix of retail shops, a Central Department store, a food court, a Major Cineplex (9-screen cinema), and a retail arcade.

They often have activities and events on the ground floor, in front of the elevators. The mall has various kids areas.

== Anchors ==
- Central The Store @ Rama 3
- Tops
- Major Cineplex 9 Cinemas
- B2S (Old B2S Think Space)
- Supersports
- Power Buy
- Food Patio
- Indoor Playground "Champion1250"

== Parking ==
The shopping center has a carpark with parking spaces for approximately 2,340 cars.

== See also ==
- List of shopping malls in Thailand
