= Central Ayutthaya =

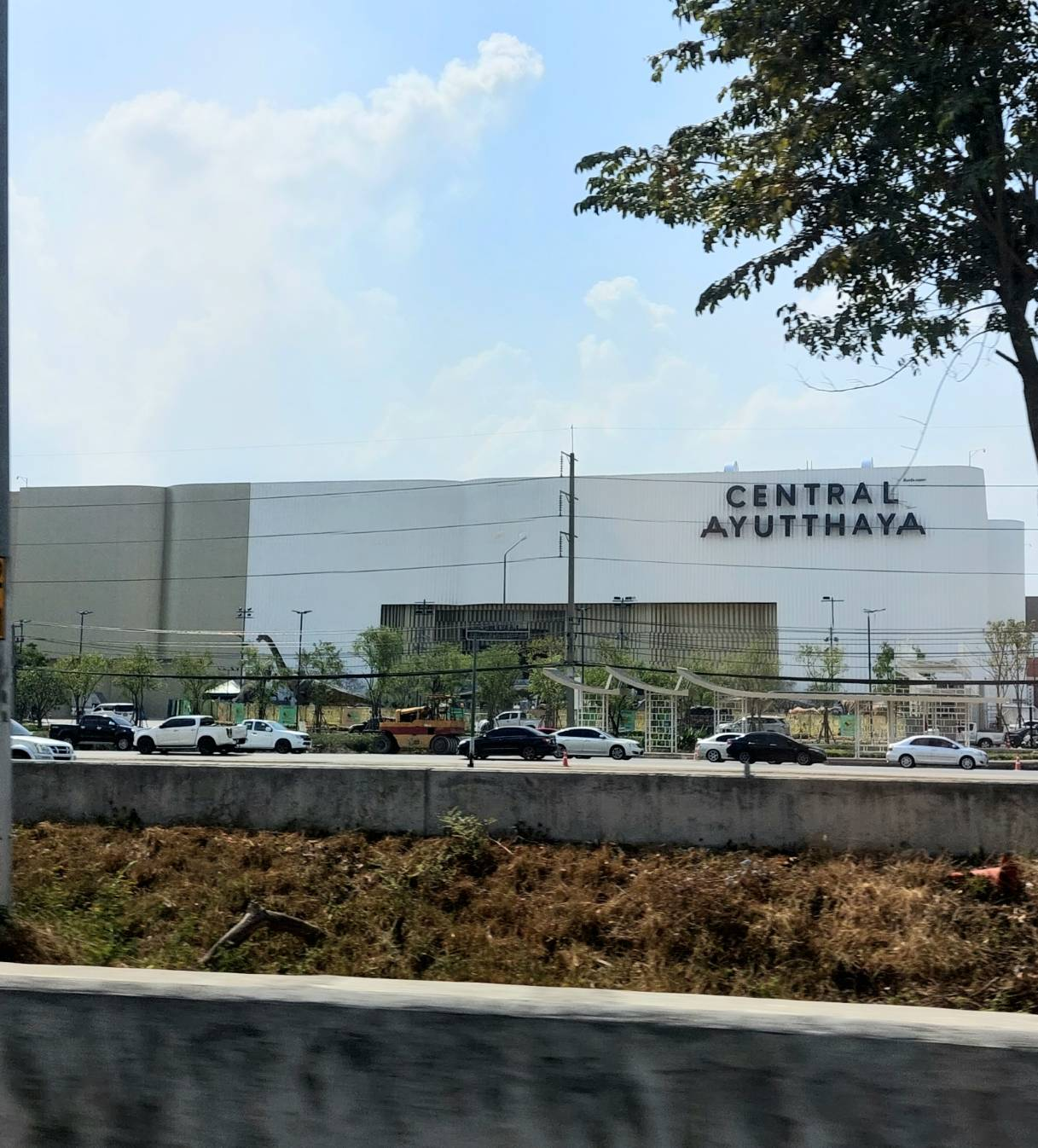
- Central Ayutthaya as seen from the opposite side (February 2022)
- Location: Khlong Suan Phlu, Phra Nakhon Si Ayutthaya, Phra Nakhon Si Ayutthaya, Thailand
- Coordinates: 14.3310918°N 100.6090596°E
- Address: 129/1, 129/2, 129/3, Moo 3, Highway 32 (Asian Highway), Phra Nakhon Si Ayutthaya, Phra Nakhon Si Ayutthaya, 13000
- Opened: November 30, 2021
- Developer: Central Pattana
- Manager: Central Pattana
- Owner: Central Pattana
- Num. of stores: 300+
- Floor area: 47 rai (7.5 ha; 19 acres)
- Website: http://www.centralplaza.co.th/ayutthaya

Central Ayutthaya is a department store and shopping plaza in Phra Nakhon Si Ayutthaya Province, about 76 km (47.2 mi) north of Bangkok, Thailand. It can be considered as another big shopping mall of Ayutthaya, and is the 36th branch of the Central Pattana network.

== The mall and design ==
The mall's building design takes into account the world heritage city of Ayutthaya. Typography of the letter A in the nameplate is inspired by the Thai stupa.

Its façade is white and gold and looks striking modern from a distance, and is designed in the form of twelve indented corners according to the late Ayutthaya architectural style. A side part of the mall at Ayothaya Road, inspired by the plaza of Phra Nakhon decorated with red bricks. These red bricks also represents historical attractions like important ancient sites. Along with a small lotus pond which is another important identity of Ayutthaya.

Its location is a gateway to the provinces of northern and northeastern region.

The mall is associated with One Tambon One Product (OTOP), a stimulus program of the Thai government.

The total cost of the shopping complex was 6.20 billion baht (€169 million).

== Anchors ==
Anchors in the plaza include:

- Robinson Department Store
- Tops
  - Tops Daily
- B2S Think Space
- Supersports
- Power Buy
- Food Park
- Uniqlo
- Jetts Fitness
- Pleun Nakhon (Indoor Market)
- Ayutthaya Hall
- SF Cinema 5 Cinemas
- Go! Hotel
- Centara Ayutthaya

== Transportation ==
Central Ayutthaya is served by shuttle bus, tuk tuk and minibus from Bangkok.
