= Central Chiangrai =

Central Chiangrai เซ็นทรัล เชียงราย
- Location: Mueang, Chiang Rai 57000, Thailand
- Coordinates: 19.8864°N 99.8335°E
- Address: 99/9 Moo 13, Rop Wiang,
- Opened: March 30, 2011
- Developer: Central Pattana
- Manager: Thanutchaporn Phongyen
- Owner: Central Pattana
- Num. of stores: 116
- Num. of anchor tenants: 6
- Floor area: 23,515 square metres (253,110 sq ft)
- Floors: 4
- Parking: 1,000

Central Chiangrai (Thai: เซ็นทรัล เชียงราย) (previously known as CentralPlaza Chiang Rai) is a shopping mall in Mueang District, Chiang Rai, Thailand.

== Anchors ==
- Robinson Department Store
- Tops
- Major Cineplex 5 Cinema
- B2S
- Power Buy
- Officemate
- Supersports
- Food Park
- Kad Luang Chiangrai
- Escent Ville Chiangrai
- Go! Hotel Chiangrai (Under Construction)

== See also ==
- List of shopping malls in Thailand
