= Central Chiangmai Airport =

Shopping mall in Thailand

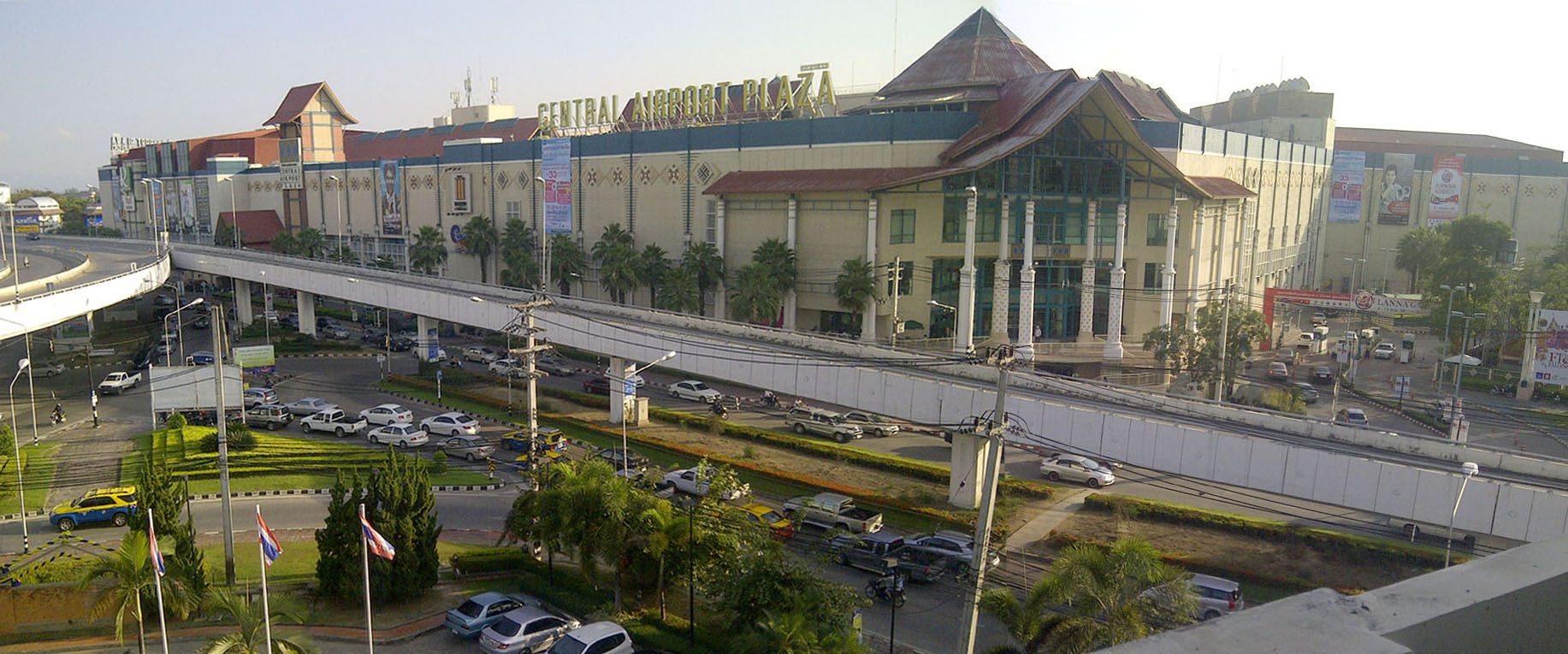
- Front of Central Chiangmai Airport
- Location: Haiya, Mueang District, Chiang Mai 50100, Thailand
- Coordinates: 18.769236°N 98.975721°E
- Address: 252 252/1 Mahidol Rd, Pa Daet Sub-district, Mueang Chiang Mai District, Chiang Mai 50100
- Opened: March 1996
- Developer: Central Pattana
- Manager: Orachorn Chanwiwattana
- Owner: Central Pattana
- Num. of stores: 533
- Num. of anchor tenants: 5
- Floor area: 75,918 square metres (817,170 sq ft)
- Floors: 5
- Parking: 2,300
- Website: www.centralplaza.co.th

Central Chiangmai Airport, previously known as CentralPlaza Chiang Mai Airport and Central Airport Plaza, is a shopping mall in Mueang District, Chiang Mai. The shopping malls was established as Tantraphan Airport Plaza (Thai: ตันตราภัณฑ์ แอร์พอร์ต พลาซา) in 1987.

Central Pattana took over and re-branded the shopping mall to Central Airport Plaza in March 1996. In early 2022, CentralPlaza Chiang Mai Airport underwent a minor name change and is now known as Central Chiang Mai Airport, which is part of Central Pattana's efforts to simplify the Central brand across Thailand.

== Anchors ==
Central Chiangmai Airport The shopping mall has five floors.

=== Current anchors ===
- Robinson Department Store
- Central The Store @ Chiangmai Airport (Opened in 2027, Renovate from Robinson department store)
- Tops
- Tops Food Hall (Opened in 2027, Renovate from Tops)
- Major Cineplex 5 Cinemas (as Old 7 Cinemas, Central requests return of the area to Harborland.)
- Go! Wholesale (Old BnB Home)
- B2S
- Supersports
- Power Buy
- Kad Luang Airport
- Harborland
- Chiangmai Hall
  - Officemate
  - Muan More Space

=== Previous anchors ===
- Food Park (Old Lanna Food Pavilion) (Move to Kad Luang Airport)
- BnB Home (Baan and Beyond) (Currently changed to Go! Wholesale)

== Gallery ==
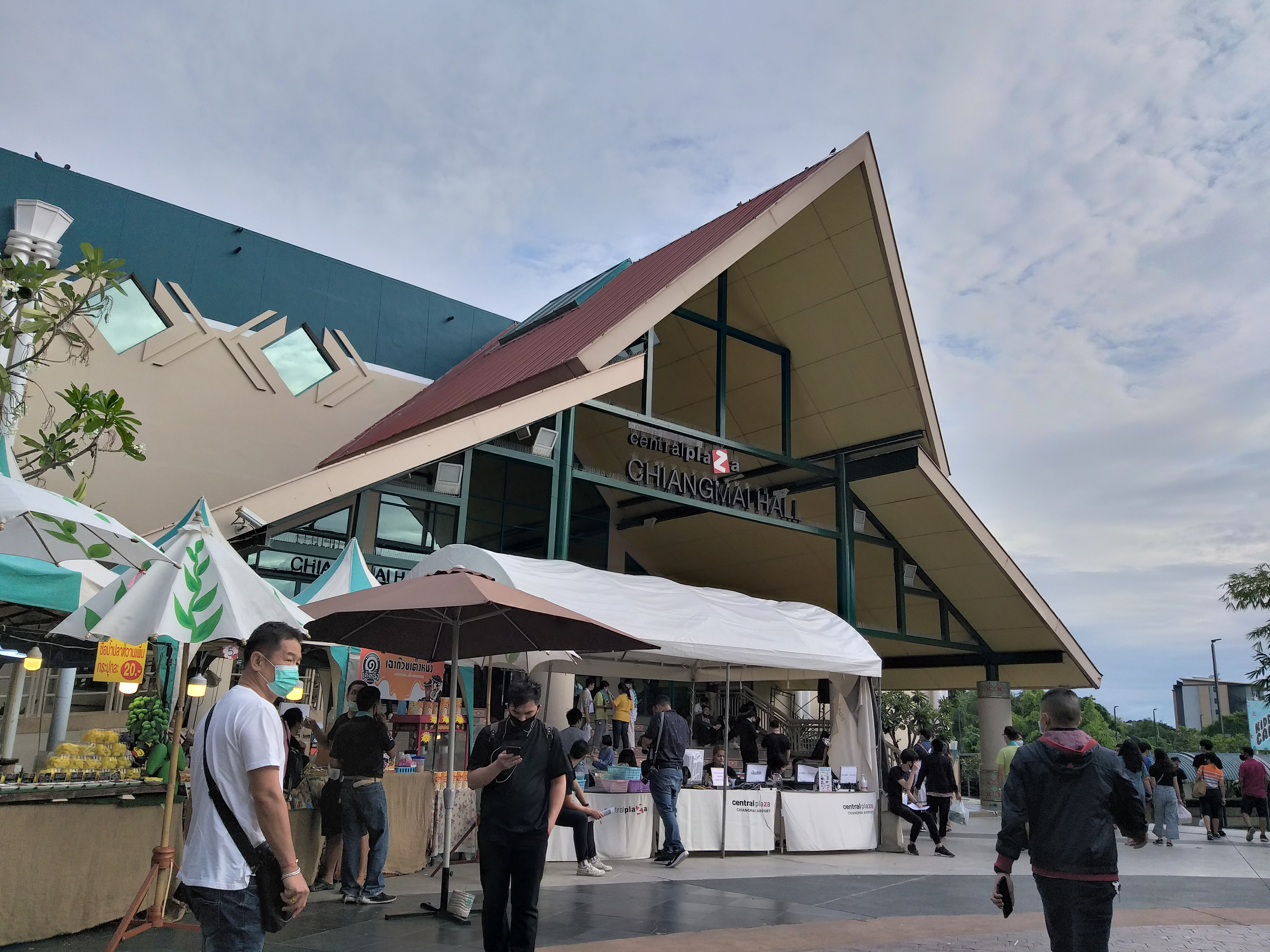
Chiangmai Hall

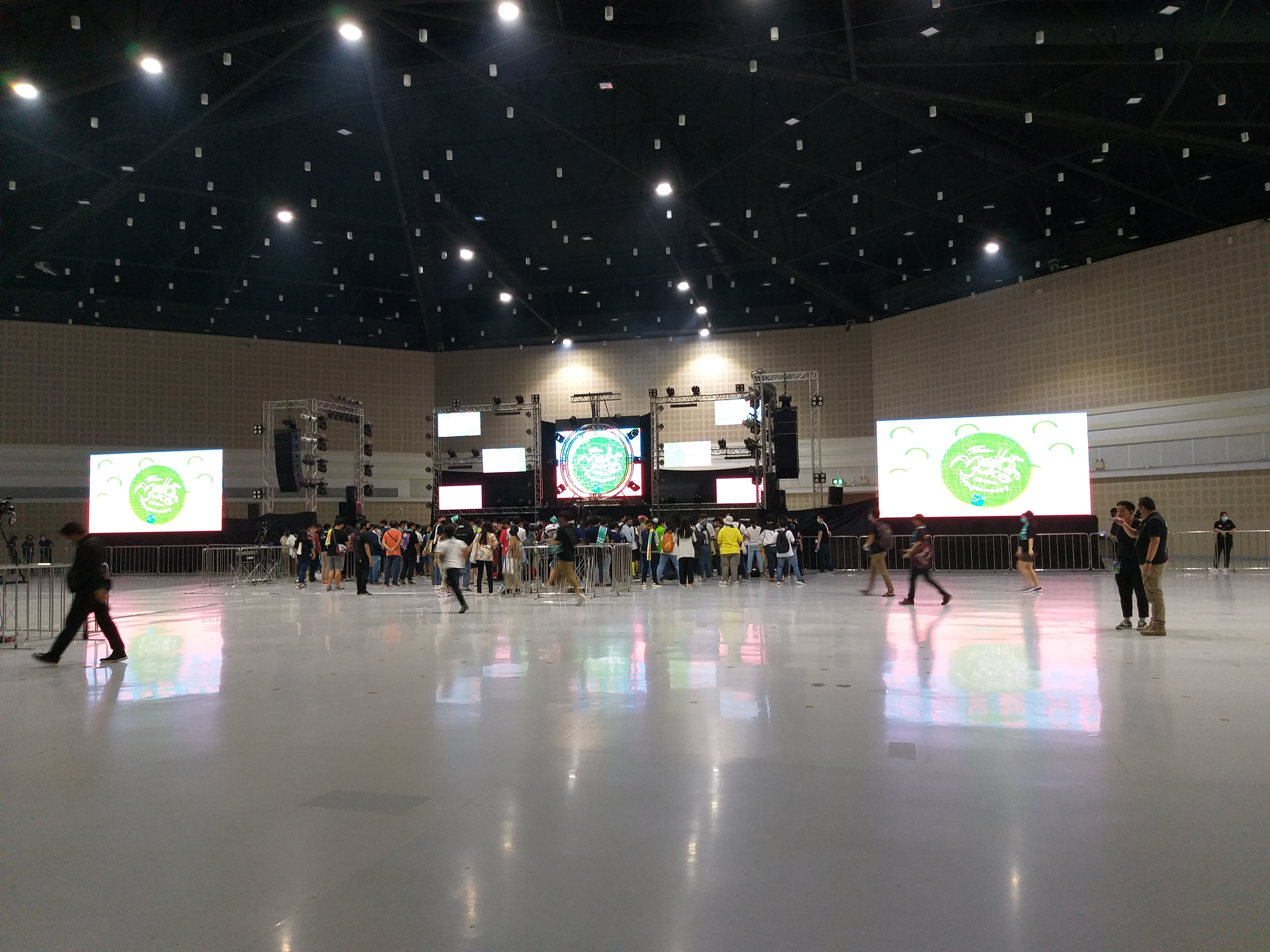
First Performance of CGM48 at Chiangmai Hall in 17 October 2020

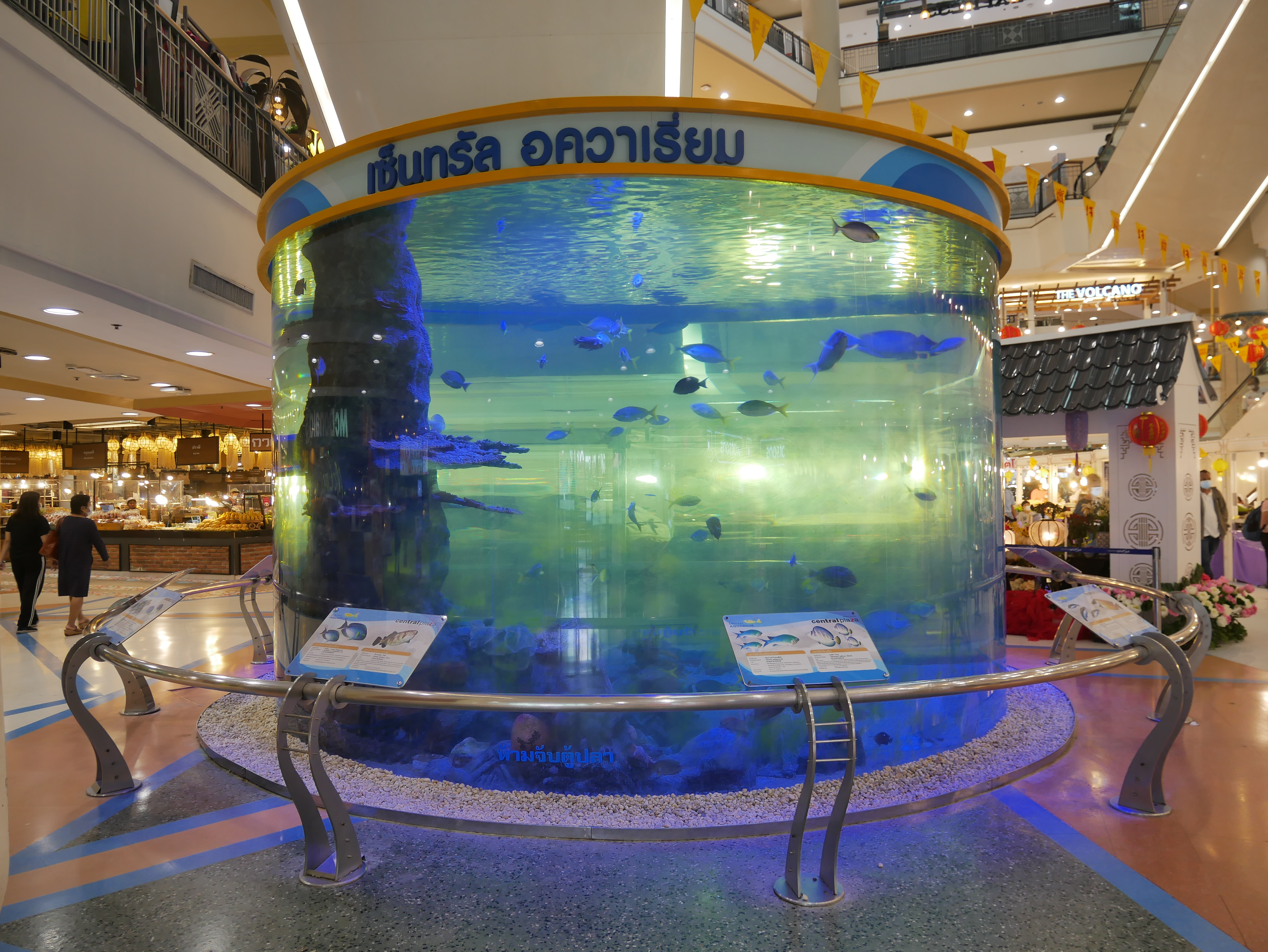
Aquarium

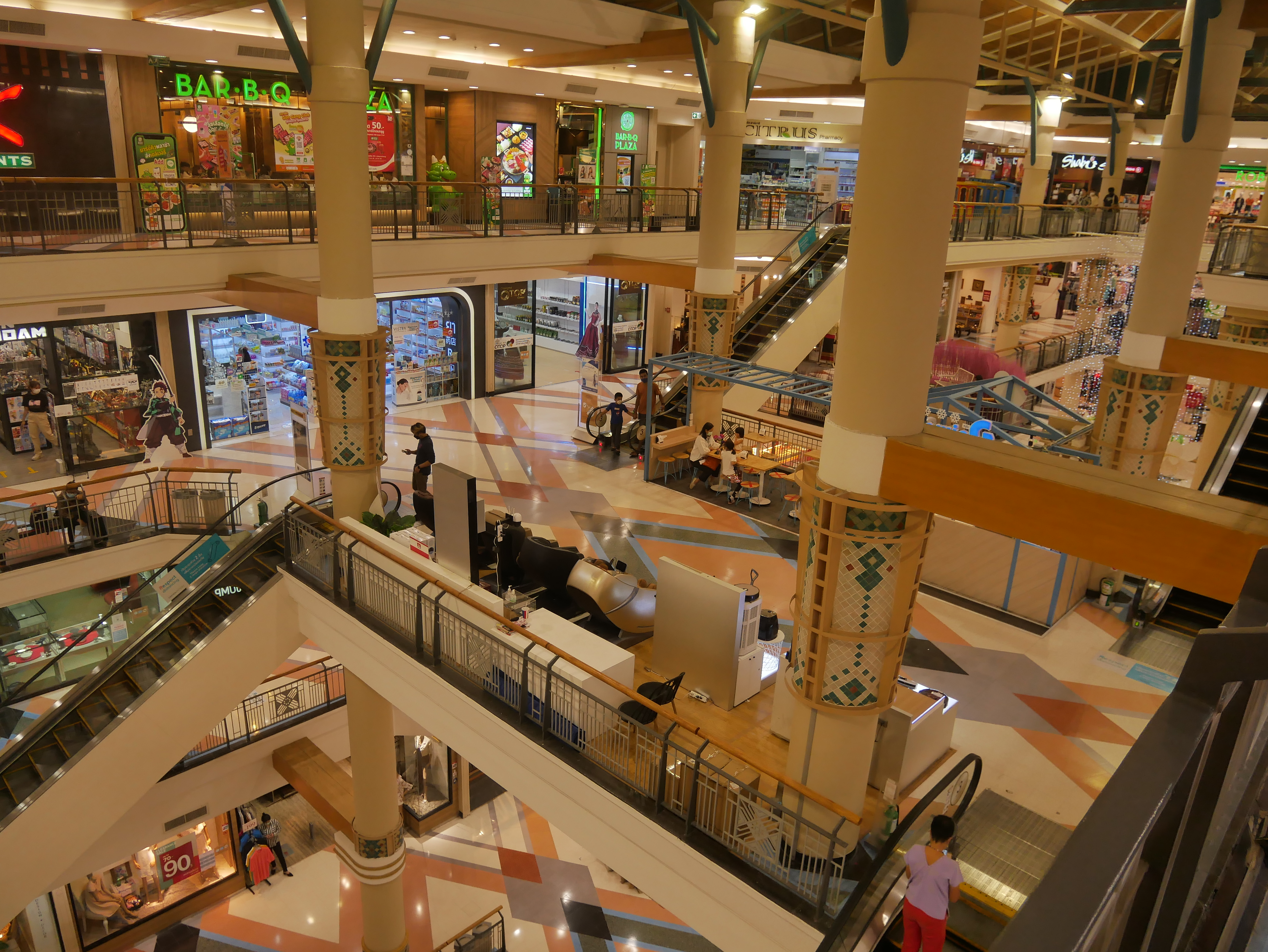

== See also ==
- List of shopping malls in Thailand
- Jewel Changi Airport
