= Central Chonburi =

Central Chonburi เซ็นทรัล ชลบุรี
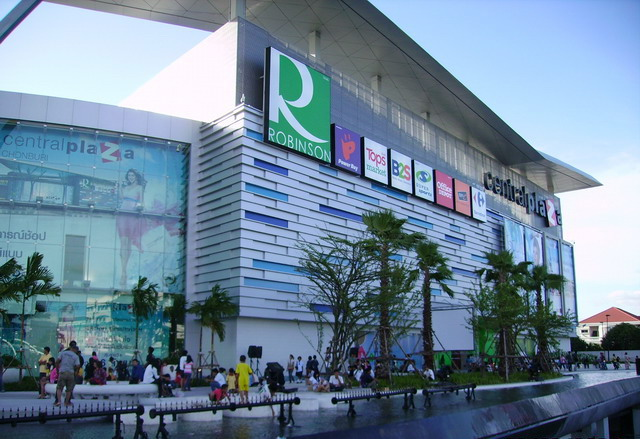
- Central Chonburi
- Location: Mueang, Chonburi 20000, Thailand
- Coordinates: 13.336415°N 100.969349°E
- Address: 55/88-89, 55/91 MOO 1, Samet
- Opened: May 29, 2009
- Developer: Central Pattana
- Manager: Theeraporn Chitnawa
- Owner: Central Pattana
- Num. of stores: 301
- Num. of anchor tenants: 5
- Floor area: 40,294 square metres (433,720 sq ft)
- Floors: 4
- Parking: 2,040 (4 level carpark building)

Central Chonburi (Thai: เซ็นทรัล ชลบุรี) (formerly known as CentralPlaza Chonburi) is a shopping and entertainment complex located on Sukhumvit Rd., Chonburi, Thailand. The shopping mall opened its doors on May 29, 2009. It has more than 200 brand-name stores on a commercial area of 100,000 square metres (1,100,000 sq ft).

The mall is one of the largest lifestyle shopping complexes in the Eastern Region of Thailand, providing complete offerings, including Robinson Department Store, retail shops, restaurants and an entertainment complex. The total cost of the shopping complex was 4,6 billion baht. It is 160 metres (520 ft) wide and 300 metres (980 ft) long.

== Anchors ==
- Robinson Department Store
- Tops
- SF Cinema 7 Cinemas
- B2S
- Officemate
- Power Buy
- Supersports
- Central Foodpark
  - Food Park
  - Social House
- Fitness First
- Go! Hotel Chonburi

=== Previously anchor ===
- Big C Central Chonburi (Old Carrefour) (29 May 2009 - 31 March 2026, Move to Big C Chonburi 1 & 2)

== See also ==
- List of shopping malls in Thailand
