= Central Phuket =

Shopping mall in Phuket, Thailand

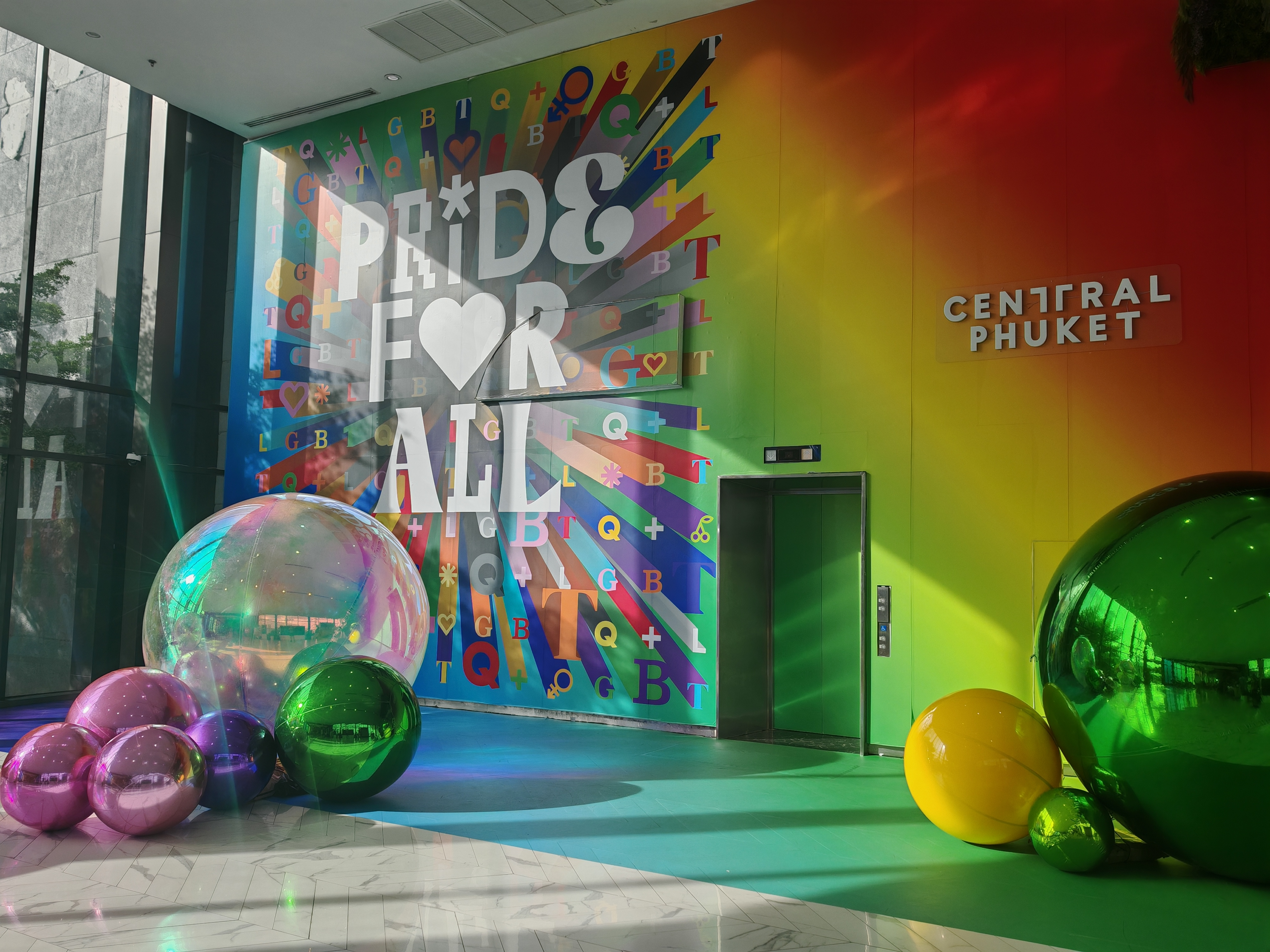
Inside Central Phuket shopping center during pride festival

Central Phuket is a shopping mall in Phuket, Thailand. It measures either 420,000 m^{2} (4,500,000 sq ft) or 400,000 m^{2} (4,300,000 sq ft) of gross leasable area, depending on the source reporting this fact. There was a major expansion with the construction of the 300,000 m^{2} (3,200,000 sq ft) "Floresta" building in 2018.

Central Phuket consists of two modernly designed buildings (Festival and Floresta) linked by moving walkways. It features 15 luxury brands, 500 lifestyle shops, 300 F&B outlets and three main attractions on 111 rai of land located in downtown Phuket. It is the largest shopping center and includes extensive food service and entertainment that consists of an aquarium and adventure theme park.

== Festival ==
Festival, the original building, was redesigned to align with the beaches and blue seas of Phuket, both inside and out, expressing the concept of “Andaman Treasure”. Catering to a variety of lifestyles, Central Phuket hosts a variety of activities from dawn to dusk. There are designated recreational areas for relaxing and socializing.

== Floresta ==
Floresta, a recent addition to Central Phuket, is decorated with nature motifs and incorporating various aspects of Thai art, culture, literature, and modern architecture.

== Anchor ==
=== Festival Building ===
- Tops (Old Central Food Hall)
- B2S
- Power Buy
- Supersports
- Officemate
- Central Food
  - Food Patio
  - Food Park (Old Food Terrace)
- SFX Cinema 8 Cinemas
- Public House
- Jetts Fitness

=== Thai Watsadu x BnB Home Building ===
- Thai Watsadu x BnB Home (Old Homeworks CentralFestival Phuket East, Baan and Beyond)
- Auto1

=== Floresta Building ===
- Central The Store @ Phuket (Moved from Festival Building)
- Tops Food Hall
- B2S
- Tales of Thailand
- Aquaria Phuket

== See also ==
- List of largest shopping malls
