= Central Phitsanulok =

- Location: Mueang, Phitsanulok 65000, Thailand
- Coordinates: 16.8407°N 100.2332°E
- Address: 9/99 Moo 5 Plaichomphon
- Opened: October 20, 2011
- Developer: Central Pattana
- Manager: Montatip Thongklai
- Owner: Central Pattana
- Num. of stores: 154
- Num. of anchor tenants: 6
- Floor area: 27,418 square metres (295,120 sq ft)
- Floors: 3
- Parking: 1,440
- Website: web.archive.org/web/20120806195922/http://www.centralplaza.co.th:80/phitsanulok/

Central Phitsanulok (previously known as CentralPlaza Phitsanulok) is a shopping mall in Mueang District, Phitsanulok, Thailand.

== Overview ==
The shopping mall has a total of 3 floors.

== Anchor ==
- Robinson Department Store
- Tops
- Major Cineplex 5 Cinemas
- Power Buy
- B2S
  - Officemate
- Supersports
- Food Patio
- Escent Town Phitsanulok

== See also ==
- List of shopping malls in Thailand
