= Robinson Department Store =

Department store chain in Thailand

Robinson Department Store ห้างสรรพสินค้าโรบินสัน
- Type: Subsidiary
- Industry: Retailing
- Founded: 1979; 47 years ago
- Headquarters: Pathum Wan, Bangkok, Thailand
- Area served: Thailand, Vietnam
- Key people: Natira Chirathivat Boonsri (President)
- Products: Clothing, Accessories, Cosmetics, Housewares
- Revenue: ▲27.01 billion baht (2014)
- Net income: ▼1.92 billion baht (2014)
- Total assets: ▲23.01 billion baht (2014)
- Owner: Central Retail Corporation
- Parent: Central Group
- Website: www.robinson.co.th

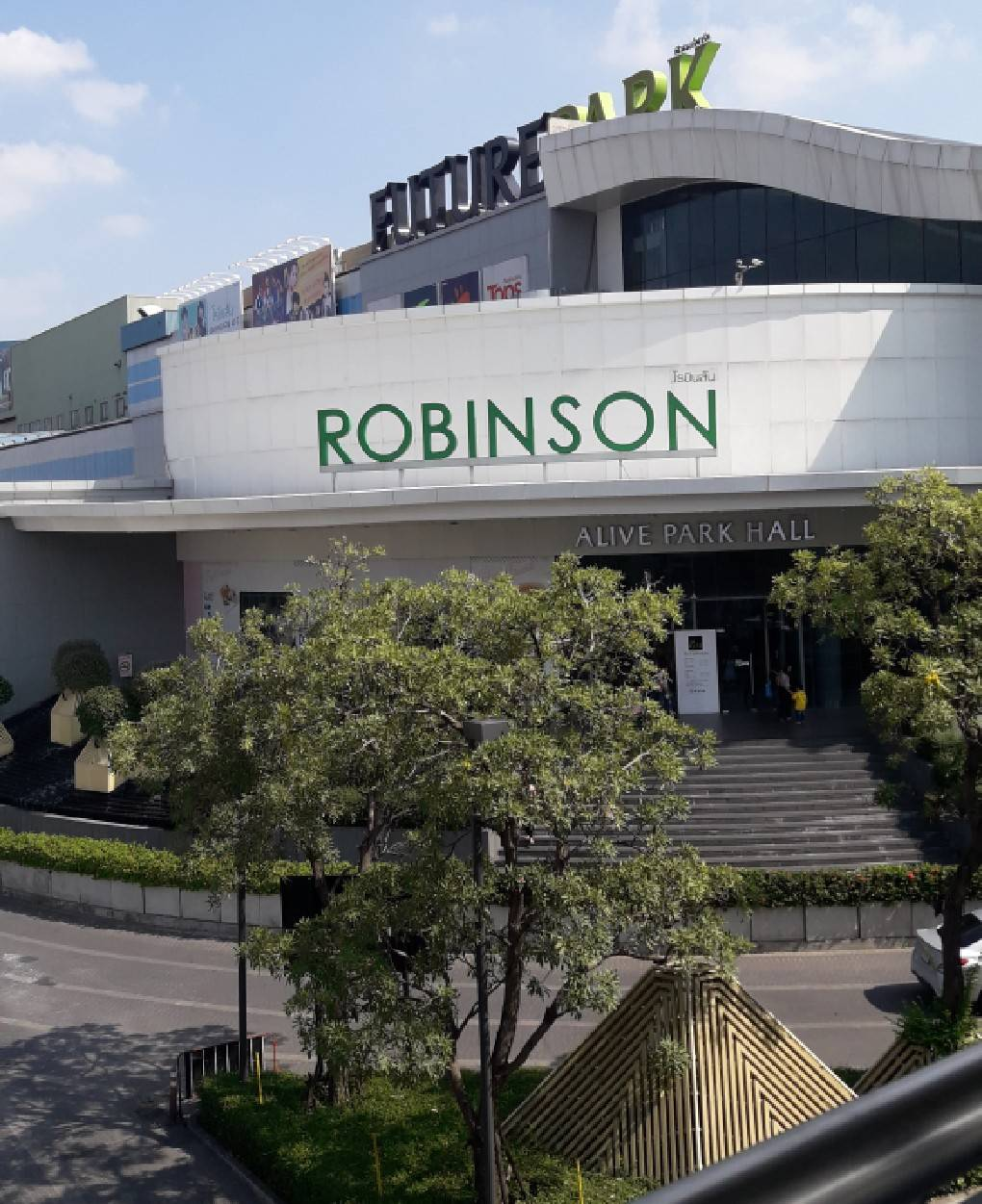
Robinson Rangsit branch

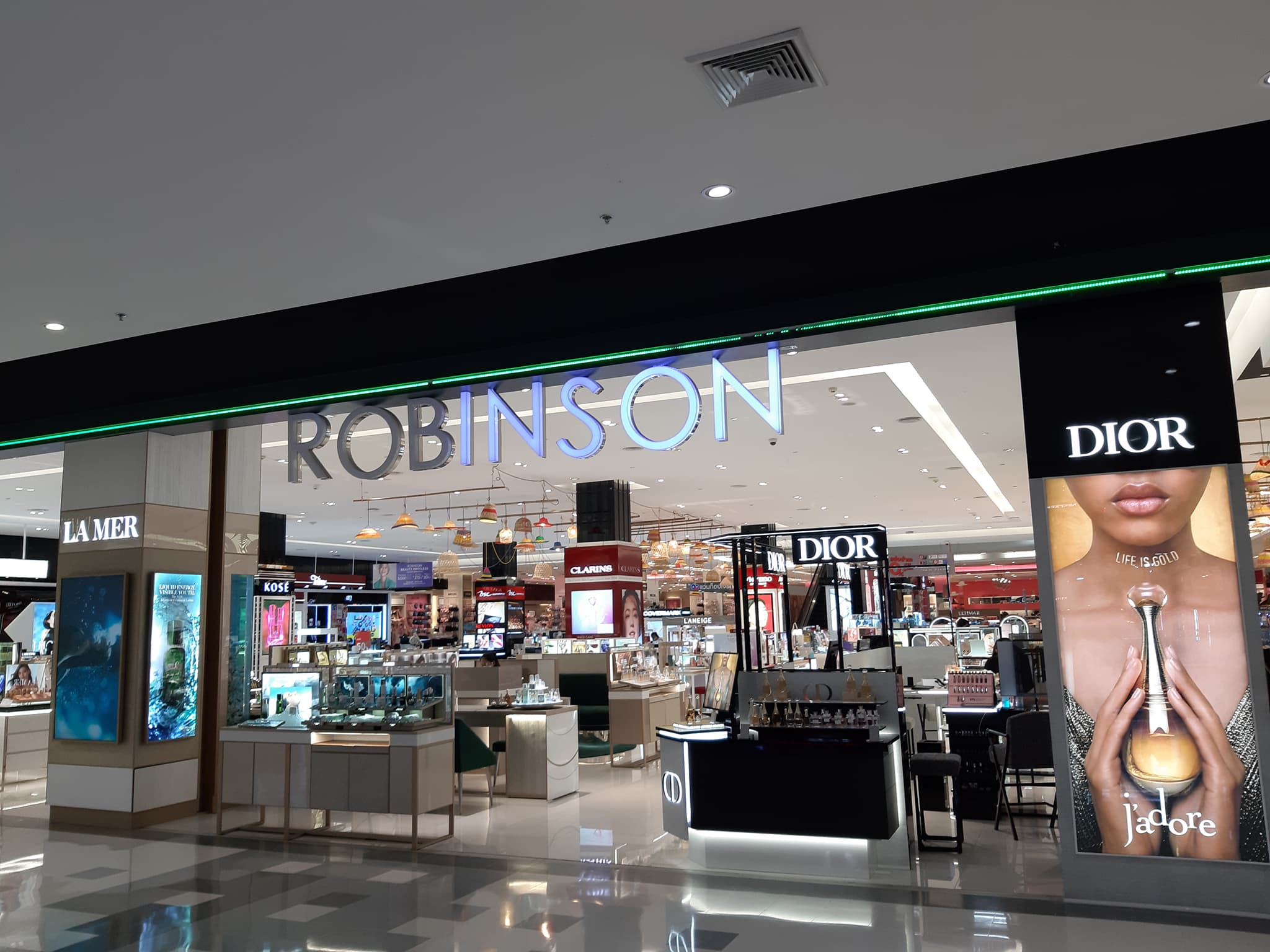
Robinson Ubon Ratchathani branch

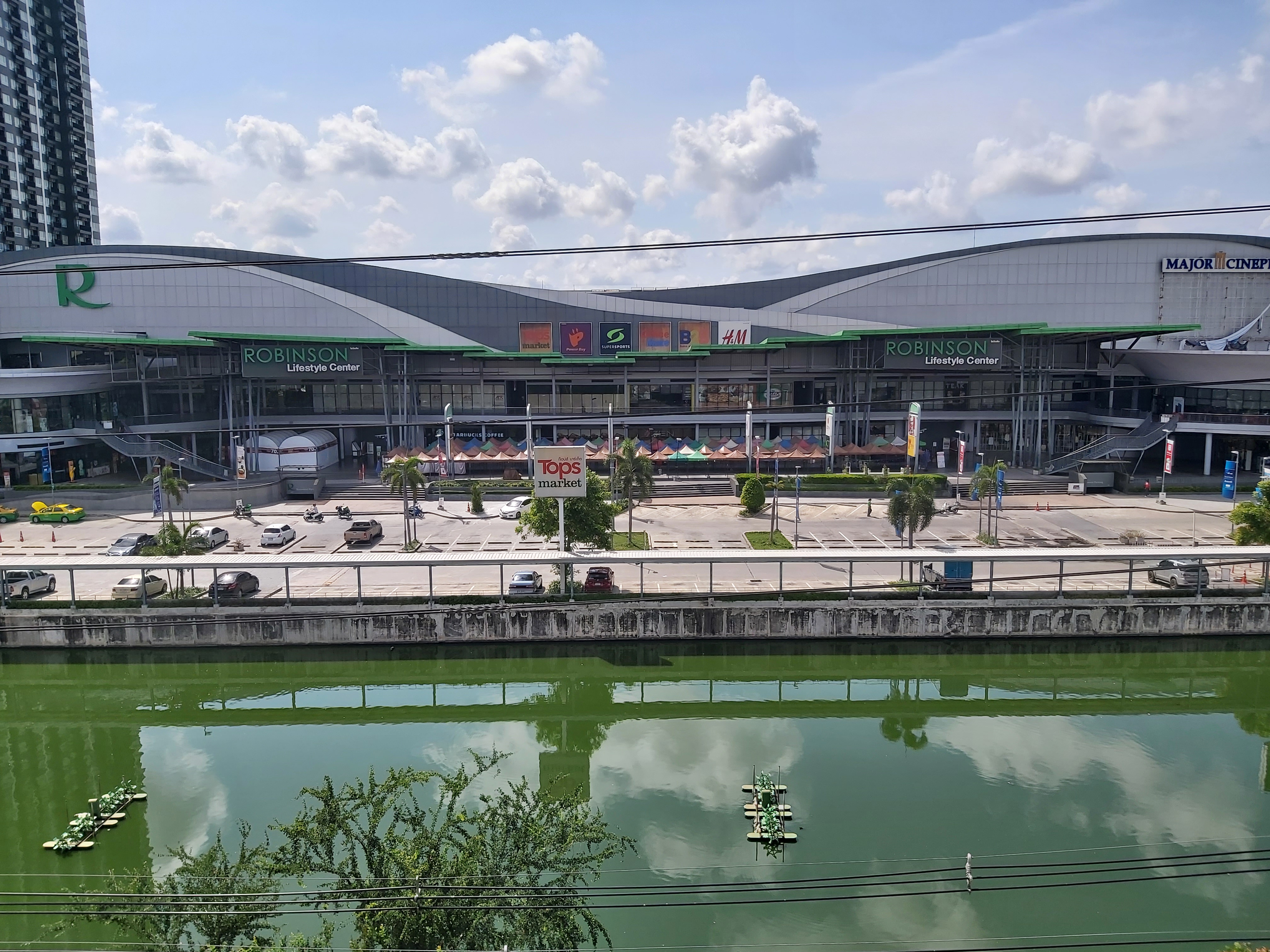
Robinson Lifestyle Samutprakan

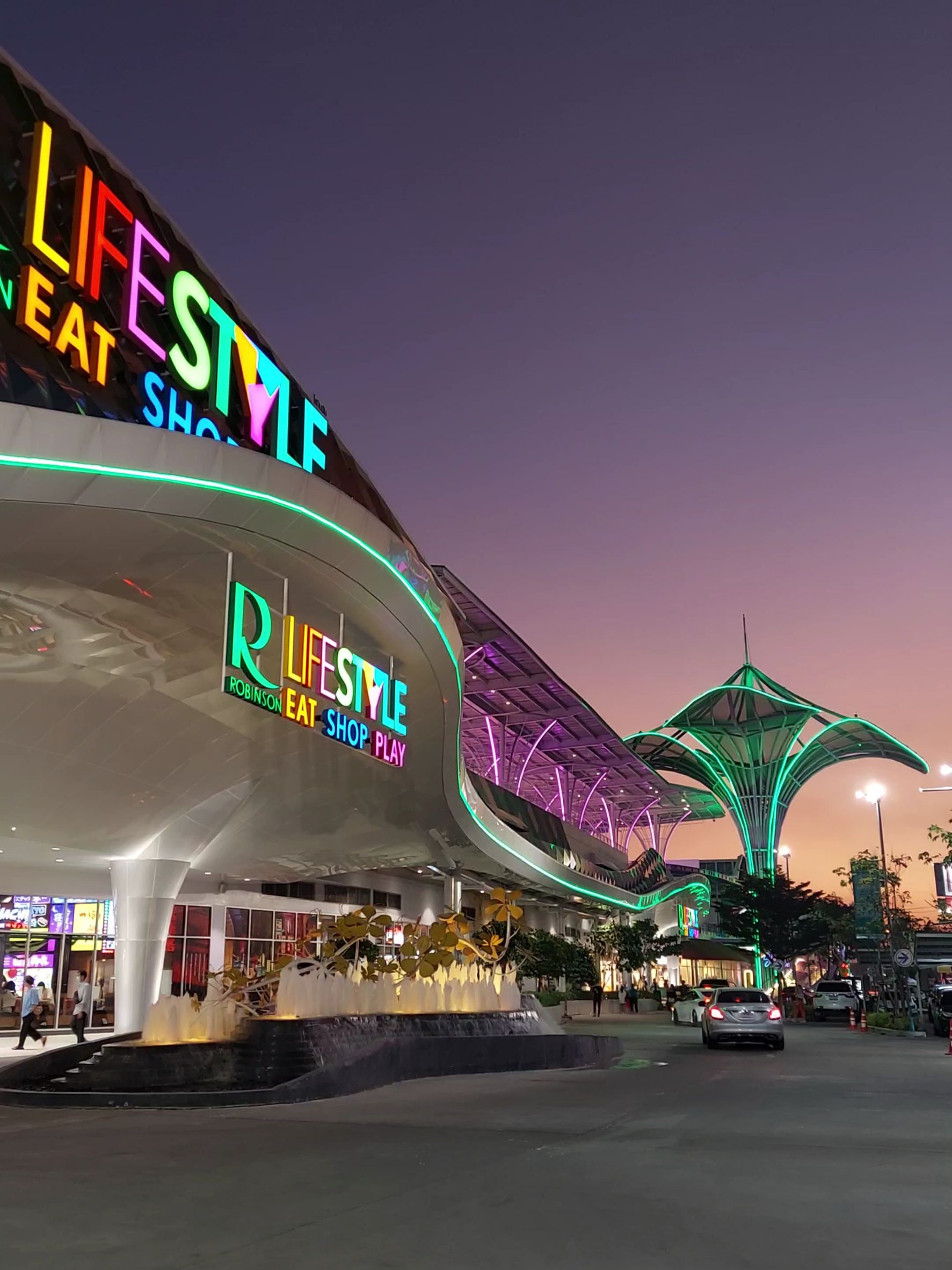
Robinson Lifestyle Ratchaphruek

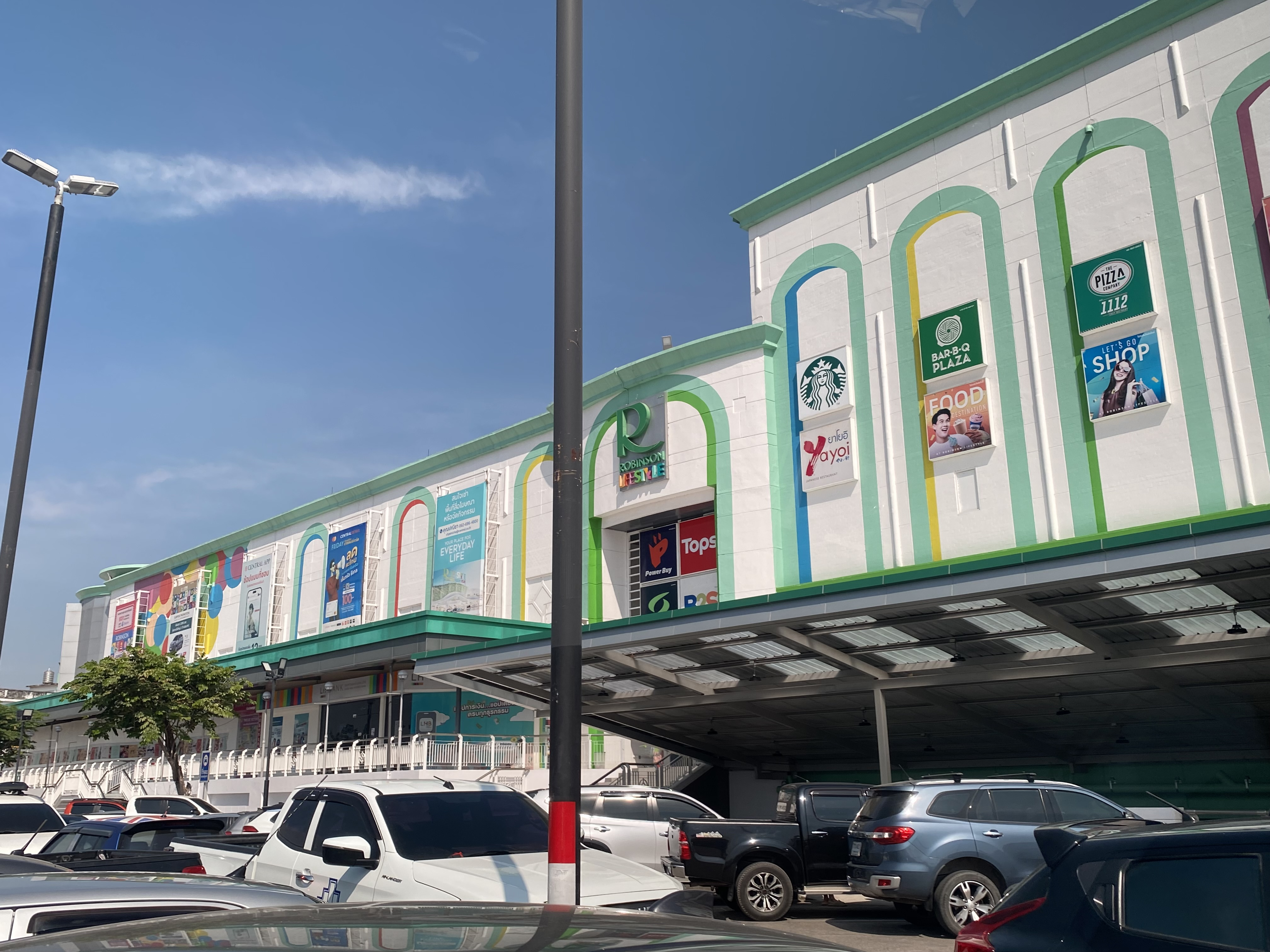
Robinson Lifestyle Ratchaburi

Robinson Department Store is a Thai owned department store. It was established in 1979 and was merged with Central Group in 1995. It is positioned as a mid-market retailer. The company, Robinson Public Company Limited, was registered in the stock exchange of Thailand in 1992 under the ticker SET: ROBINS. It is listed on the SET50 index. The company and its subsidiaries operate department stores under the Robinson brand and shopping centers under Robinson Lifestyle brand.

After the merger Robinson Department Store has been transferred to be under the management of Central Department Store

As of year-end 2014 operated 39 stores in Thailand and two in Vietnam totaling over 450,000 m^{2} of retail space. A total of 48 branches were scheduled by the end of 2018: 11 branches in Bangkok Metropolitan Region and 37 branches in other provinces, together with 2 branches in Vietnam.

== Stores ==
=== Bangkok Metropolitan Region ===
Store Name	Opening Date	Province	Located in
Sukhumvit	1 December 1990	Bangkok	The Westin Grande Sukhumvit
Rangsit	18 March 1995	Pathum Thani	Future Park Rangsit
Samutprakan	31 October 2014	Samutprakan	Robinson Samutprakarn
Srisaman	11 November 2015	Nonthaburi	Robinson Srisaman
Mahachai	23 November 2017	Samutsakorn	Central Mahachai
Suvarnabhumi (Ladkrabang Road)	14 November 2019	Bangkok	Robinson Suvarnabhumi
Ratchaphruek (Ratchaphruek Road)	17 November 2022	Nonthaburi	Robinson Ratchaphruek

=== Other regions ===
Store Name	Opening Date	Province	Located in
Hatyai	1 December 1995	Songkhla	Robinson Hatyai
Chiang Mai Airport	26 January 1996	Chiang Mai	Central Chiangmai Airport
Ratchaburi	1 November 1996	Ratchaburi	Robinson Ratchaburi
Si Racha	31 May 1997	Chonburi	Pacific Park Sriracha
Chanthaburi	16 January 1998	Chanthaburi	Robinson Chanthaburi
Ayutthaya	16 November 2006	Ayutthaya	Ayutthaya City Park
Patong	31 August 2007	Phuket	Jungceylon Patong Phuket
Chonburi	27 May 2009	Chonburi	Central Chonburi
Trang	11 November 2010	Trang	Robinson Trang
Chiang Rai	30 March 2011	Chiang Rai	Central Chiangrai
Phitsanulok	20 October 2011	Phitsanulok	Central Phitsanulok
Suphan Buri	2 March 2012	Suphanburi	Robinson Suphan Buri
Surat Thani	11 October 2012	Suratthani	Central Suratthani
Lampang	30 November 2012	Lampang	Central Lampang
Kanchanaburi	28 February 2013	Kanchanaburi	Robinson Kanchanaburi
Ubon Ratchathani	5 April 2013	Ubon Ratchathani	Central Ubon
Sakon Nakhon	27 June 2013	Sakon Nakhon	Robinson Sakon Nakhon
Saraburi	22 November 2013	Saraburi	Robinson Saraburi
Surin	20 December 2013	Surin	Robinson Surin
Chachoengsao	12 September 2014	Chachoengsao	Robinson Chachoengsao
Roi Et	3 October 2014	Roi Et	Robinson Roi Et
Prachinburi	4 December 2014	Prachinburi	Robinson Prachinburi
Mukdahan	19 December 2014	Mukdahan	Robinson Mukdahan
Rayong	27 May 2015	Rayong	Central Rayong
Buriram	29 July 2015	Buriram	Robinson Buriram
Mae Sot	18 December 2015	Tak	Robinson Mae Sot
Nakhon Si Thammarat	28 July 2016	Nakhon Si Thammarat	Central Nakhon Si
Lopburi	16 December 2016	Lopburi	Robinson Lopburi
Phetchaburi	19 May 2017	Phetchaburi	Robinson Phetchaburi
Kamphaengphet	8 December 2017	Kamphaengphet	Robinson Kamphaengphet
Chonburi 2 (Amata Nakhon)	27 June 2018	Chonburi	Robinson Chonburi
Chaiyaphum	1 December 2018	Chaiyaphum	Robinson Chaiyaphum
Bowin (Si Racha)	17 May 2020	Chonburi	Robinson Bowin
Ayutthaya 2	30 November 2021	Ayutthaya	Central Ayutthaya
Banchang	3 March 2022	Rayong	Robinson Banchang
Thalang	25 August 2022	Phuket	Robinson Thalang
Chalong (Phuket)	20 September 2023	Phuket	Robinson Chalong (Phuket)
Nongkhai	April 2027 (Under Construction)	Nongkhai	Robinson Nongkhai

=== Overseas ===
In 2014, the company expanded its business to Vietnam under the “ROBINS” name.

Store Name	Opening Date	Location	Located in
Mega Mall Royal City	April 2014	Hanoi	Mega Mall Royal City
Crescent Mall	December 2014	Ho Chi Minh City	Crescent Mall

== See also ==
- Robinson Lifestyle Center
- Central Department Store
- The Mall Department Store
- Zen Department Store
- Chirathivat family
- Central Pattana
