= Tops (Thai supermarket) =

Supermarket chain

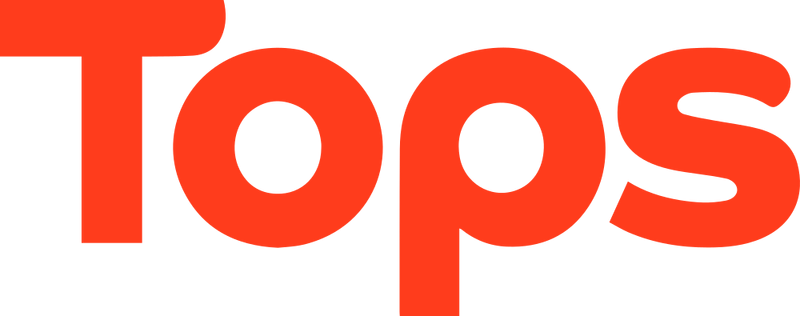

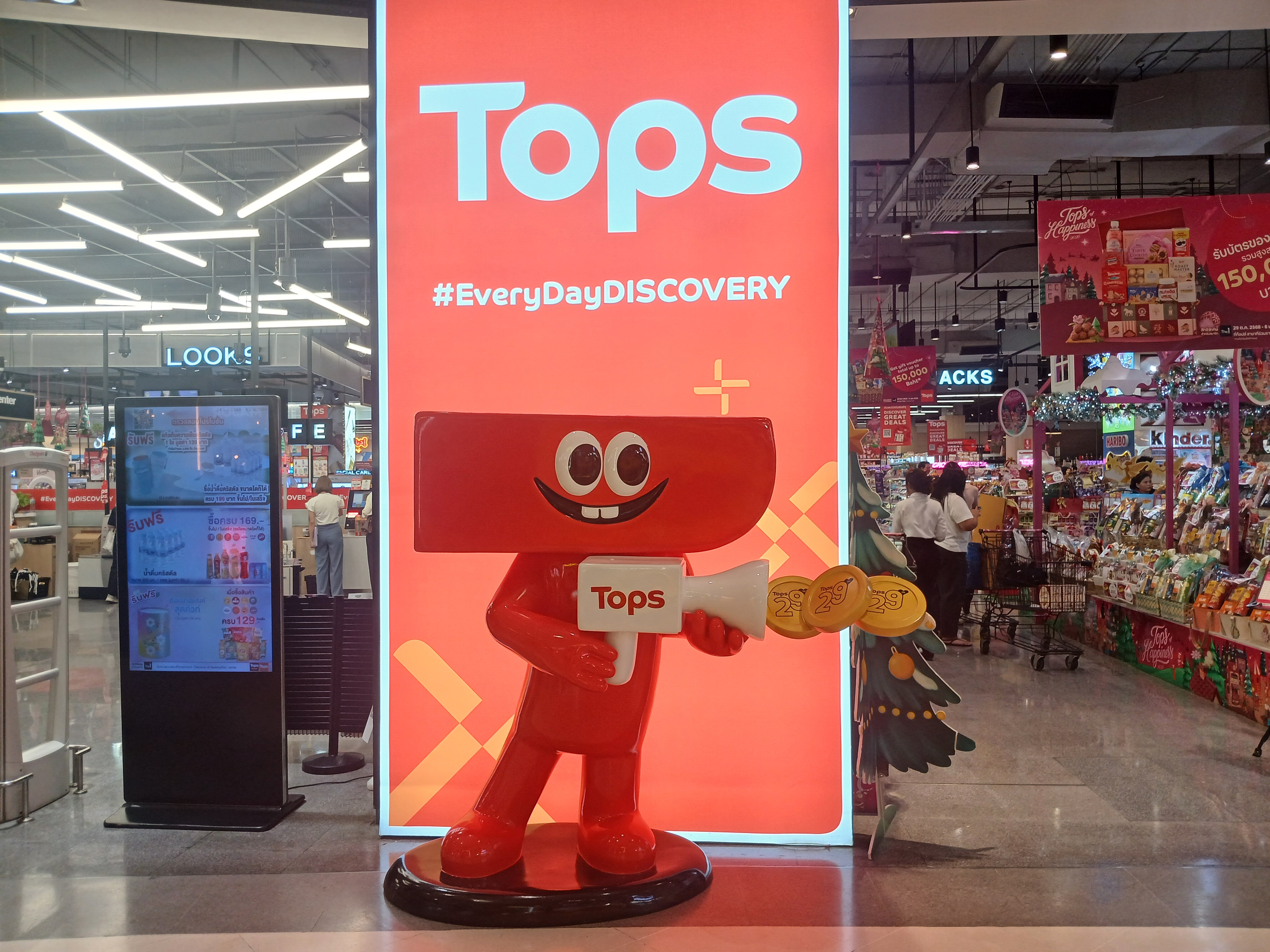
- Tops Supermarket inside Central WestGate shopping mall
- Type: Private
- Industry: Food retailing
- Headquarters: Thailand
- Website: www.tops.co.th/en/

Tops is a grocery chain in Thailand. Co-founded by the then-parent of U.S.-based Tops Markets LLC, the chain is operated under the name Tops Supermarket in Thailand by Central Food Retail, a subsidiary of Central Retail Corporation. In addition to Tops Supermarket, some branches are called Tops, Tops Daily, Tops Food Hall, and Tops Fine Food. It is the largest supermarket chain in Thailand and operates 235 stores nationwide.

== History ==
The company was established as CRC Ahold Co., Ltd. in 1996 by integration of Robinson Department Store and Central Group supermarket business and formed a joint venture with Royal Ahold Co., Ltd., a Netherlands-based supermarket operator, owning a 49 percent stake. The stores were renamed Tops Supermarket, which Ahold borrowed from its U.S. supermarket holding, Tops Markets, but did not reuse its red diamond logo. Tops Supermarket's first branch is in Royal City Avenue. In December 1996 and 1998, Robinson sold all of its invested shares to Ahold. In 2004, Ahold sold its stake to Central as part of the Dutch company's withdrawal from Asia.

In 2004, Central converted 20 former Food Lion locations to Tops after their parent, Delhaize Group, closed its Thailand supermarket operations. In 2023, Central's franchise agreement with Japan's convenience store chain FamilyMart ended, and its roughly 200 FamilyMart stores in Thailand were to be converted to the Tops Daily brand.

== Store types ==
- Tops Plaza is a Shopping Center. In addition, there are main shopping centers such as Tops, Department Store, and cinemas. The first branch is Phichit since 22 December 2017
- Tops Food Hall premium grade supermarket. Recognized as one of "25 grocery stores around the world that you need to visit before you die" by The Canadian Grocer.
- Tops Fine Food
- Tops high-tier supermarket.
- Tops Daily convenience store size of 100–200 square meters.
