= Krittanun Aunchananun =

Thai actor (born 2004)

- กฤตนัน อัญชนานันท์
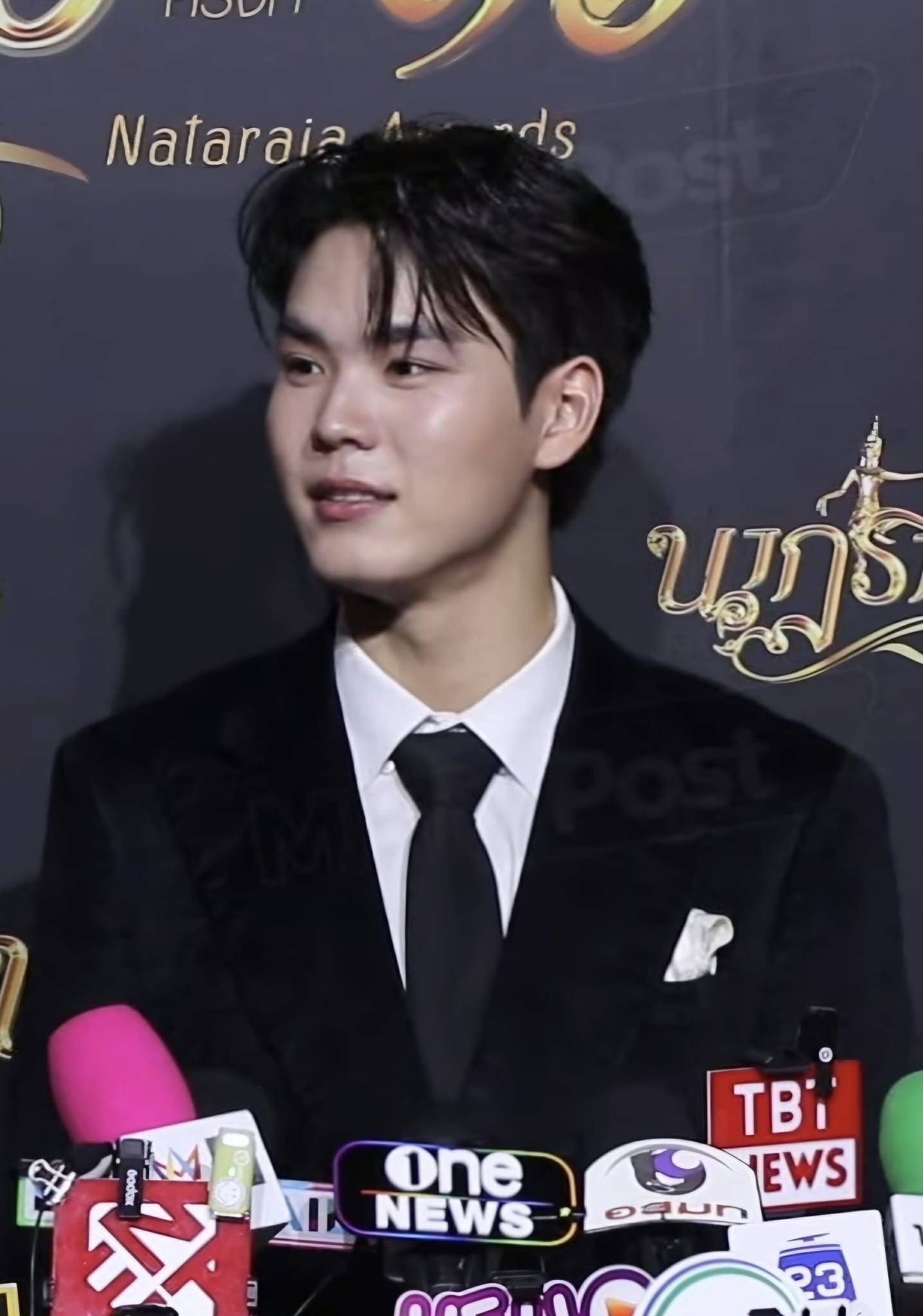
- Krittanun in June 2025
- Born: 6 September 2004 (age 22); Bangkok, Thailand
- Other name: Ping (ปิง)
- Occupation: Actor
- Years active: 2022–present
- Agent: GMMTV
- Height: 1.86 m (6 ft 1 in)

Krittanun Aunchananun (Thai: กฤตนัน อัญชนานันท์; born 6 September 2004), nicknamed Ping (Thai: ปิง), is a Thai actor under GMMTV. He became known for starring in the series Ai Long Nhai (2022), My Dear Gangster Oppa (2023), and The Rebound (2024). In 2026, he stars in the GMMTV series Match Point.

== Early life and education ==
Krittanun was born in Bangkok, Thailand. He completed high school at Bangkok Christian College and is currently studying Business Administration with a focus on Kitchen Management and Culinary Arts at Dusit Thani College.

== Career ==
Ping made his acting debut in 2022 in the BL series Ai Long Nhai, playing the lead role of "Nai" alongside Nichakoon Khajornborirak (Meen).

Following his success, he starred in other series, including My Dear Gangster Oppa (2023) and The Rebound (2024).

Ping began his career under the agency Mchoice. In May 2025, he signed a contract with GMMTV.

In 2026, Ping is set to appear in the GMMTV series Match Point.

== Filmography ==
=== Television series ===
Key
†	Denotes television productions that have not yet been released

Year	Title	Role	Notes	Network	Ref.
2022	Ai Long Nhai	Chen Nhai	Main role	Channel 3 HD	
2023	Ai Long Nhai: Same Moon	Chen Nhai	Main role	iQIYI	
2023	My Dear Gangster Oppa	Guy	Main role	iQIYI	
2023	Matalada	Traichat (young)	Guest role	Channel 3 HD	
2024	The Rebound	Zen	Main role	Viu	
2026	Match Point	"Sun" Yotsawit Thiticharoen	Main role	GMM 25	
TBA	Cinematch †	Bamee	Main role	TBA	

=== Music video appearances ===
Year	Title	Artist(s)	Label	Ref.
2024	"The Rebound"; The Rebound OST	Maiyarap	Viu Thailand	

== Discography ==
=== Singles ===
==== Soundtrack appearances ====
Year	Title	Soundtrack	Label	Ref.
2023	"ที่ของเรา (Area)" with Meen Nichakoon	My Dear Gangster Oppa OST	Dream and Destiny	
2023	"ทางไหนดี (What If)"	My Dear Gangster Oppa OST	Dream and Destiny	
2026	"Love Match" with Teshow Promsakha	Match Point OST	GMMTV Records	
2026	"ได้เวลารัก (Love Time)" with Teshow Promsakha	Match Point OST	GMMTV Records	

== Fan meetings ==
Title	Date	Venue	Notes	Ref.
MeenPing "To The Moon" Fan Meeting	March 24–25, 2023	CentralWorld Live	With Meen	
MeenPing Fan Meeting in Cambodia	May 13, 2023	Aeon Mean Chey	With Meen	
MeenPing Fan Meeting in Vietnam	July 29, 2023	La Vela Saigon Hotel, Ho Chi Minh City	With Meen	
MeenPing Fan Meeting in Hong Kong	September 29, 2023	Music Zone, E-Max	With Meen	
My Dear Gangster Oppa Final EP. Fan Meeting	December 14, 2023	Earthlab Cinema, CentralWorld	With My Dear Gangster Oppa cast	
MeenPing "To My Dear" Fan Meeting	February 10, 2024	Centerpoint Studio	With Meen	
The Rebound: First Premiere	June 25, 2024	Major Cineplex Sukhumvit	With The Rebound cast	
MeenPing Fan Meeting in Japan	July 21, 2024	Akigawa Kirara Hall	With Meen	
The Rebound Final EP. Fan Meeting	August 1, 2024	Major Cineplex Sukhumvit	With The Rebound cast	
MeenPing Fan Meeting in Taipei	September 21, 2024	Hanaspace	With Meen	
MeenPing "Now & Forever" Fan Meeting	March 16, 2025	True Icon Hall, Iconsiam	With Meen	
Match Point: The First Match	July 26, 2026	SF World Cinema, CentralWorld	With Match Point cast	
GMMTV International Novel Festival 2026	July 30, 2026	Samyan Mitrtown, 5th Fl.	With Teshow	
Match Point: Message Box	September 29, 2026	Union Hall, Union Mall	With Match Point cast	
GMMTV Fanival: Happy Family	October 5, 2026	Union Hall, Union Mall	With Teshow	
GMMTV Fan Event in Tokyo	December 6, 2026	Animate Theater	With Teshow	

== Awards and nominations ==
Year	Award	Category	Nominee(s)	Result	Ref.
2022	ChobAPP Awards	Rising Actor of the Year	Ping Krittanun	Won	
2023	Young Male Star Awards	Most Favorite (Group 1)	Ping Krittanun	Won	
2024	Asian Academy Creative Awards	Best Actor in a Supporting Role	The Rebound	Won	
2024	Asian Academy Creative Awards	Best Dressed Celebrity – Fans' Choice	Ping Krittanun	Won	
2024	Thailand Digital Awards 2024	Outstanding Couple Promoting Sports	Meen Nichakoon & Ping Krittanun	Won	
2025	Thai Update Awards 2025	Best Couple	Meen Nichakoon & Ping Krittanun	Won	
2025	Nataraja Awards	Best Supporting Actor	The Rebound	Nominated	
