= Match Point (TV series) =

2026 Thai television series

- Official series poster
- Thai: รักนี้ต้องเสิร์ฟ
- Genre: Sports; Romance
- Screenplay by: Supachod Kajonsiripong; Suwanun Pohgudsai; Sornpanath Patpho
- Directed by: Sakon Tiacharoen
- Starring: Teshow Promsakha Na Sakonnakhon; Krittanun Aunchananun
- Ending theme: "Love Match" by Teshow Promsakha and Ping Krittanun
- Country of origin: Thailand
- Original language: Thai
- No. of episodes: 10

Production
- Executive producers: Sataporn Panichraksapong; Darapa Choeysanguan
- Producers: Ekkasit Trakulkasemsuk; Nuttapong Mongkolsawas; Supaporn Lertthitiverakarn
- Cinematography: Prompong Jareansook
- Running time: 42–48 minutes
- Production companies: GMMTV; Keng Kwang Kang Waisai

Original release
- Network: GMM 25; OneD
- Release: 26 July – 27 September 2026

Match Point (Thai: รักนี้ต้องเสิร์ฟ; RTGS: Rak Ni Tong Soep, lit. 'This Love Must Serve') is a 2026 Thai boys' love television series starring Teshow Promsakha Na Sakonnakhon and Krittanun Aunchananun (Ping). Directed by Sakon Tiacharoen and produced by GMMTV and Keng Kwang Kang Waisai, the series was announced during the GMMTV 2026: Magic Vibes Maximized event on 25 November 2025.

The series premiered on GMM 25 and OneD on 26 July 2026, airing on Sundays at 20:30 ICT and 21:30 ICT, respectively.

== Synopsis ==
Sun (Krittanun Aunchananun), the perfect son and tennis player, and Bay (Teshow Promsakha Na Sakonnakhon) an independent arts student and winner of multiple art awards, have fathers who have hated each other since before their school days. Their families own rival Dim Sun restaurants on Krong Thong Road. One day, Sun negotiates a truce with Bay to enjoy their final semester together, but Bay deliberately enters a tennis tryout to annoy Sun one last time. Enraged, Sun joins the match to teach Bay a lesson and ends up losing due to injury. The principal orders a rematch, but their fathers conspire to make a deal: the losing son must close down their family's restaurant for good.

On the crucial match day, and accident befalls both sons and the principal orders them both to play together as a doubles pair in an upcoming tournament. Bay and Sun are stunned but agree, keeping their burgeoning friendship a secret from their fathers. Helping them out on that front is tennis coach Kong (Wachirawit Ruangwiwat), who seems to be spending a lot of time with Bay's older brother, Boat (Harit Cheewagaroon). During a training camp at a countryside resort, the sons begin to open up to each other, but their fathers' animosity remains.

Bay and Sun make a bet of their own: if they win the men's doubles championship then their fathers would have to let them be together, but if they lose, they'll never see each other again.

== Cast and characters ==
=== Main ===
- Teshow Promsakha Na Sakonnakhon as Benyu Tharnweeranan (Bay)
- Krittanun Aunchananun (Ping) as Yotsawit Thiticharoen (Sun)

=== Supporting ===
- Harit Cheewagaroon (Sing) as Boat Thanweeranan
- Wachirawit Ruangwiwat (Chimon) as Kong
- Chartayodom Hiranyasthiti (Chai) as Bee Thanweeranan
- Amarin Nitibhon (Am) as Chun Thiticharoen
- Bhobdhama Hansa (Java) as Zippo
- Naruth Prateeppavameta (Franc) as Petong
- Tarnpol Pongnarisorn (Tata) as Ken
- Weerayut Chansook (Arm) as Ming Thiticharoen
- Thanchanok Tinsulanonda (Maitai) as Ally
- Ratapirom Bandapraneat (Michiru) as Kaew
- Chayapol Jutamas (AJ) as Wanlop (Kan)
- Chayakorn Jutamas (JJ) and Thunlop (Kelvin)
- Kittiporn Rodvanich (Tangmo) as Principal Pirunporn Chueakewmanee
- Duangjai Hiransri (Pure) as Bay and Boat's mother
- Chotiros Kaewpinit (Sobee) as Sun's mother

== Original soundtrack ==
The official soundtrack for Match Point features:

Song	Artist(s)	Label	Ref.
"Love Match"	Teshow Promsakha and Ping Krittanun	GMMTV Records	
"ได้เวลารัก (Love Time)"	Teshow Promsakha and Ping Krittanun	GMMTV Records	

== Production ==
Filming for the series officially began on 22 February 2026. The series had three interview segments for the web show GMMTV: Live House, with the first segment on 17 March 2026 revealing additional cast members Bhobdhama Hansa, Naruth Prateeppavameta and Tarnpol Pongnarisorn. The second segment on 21 April 2026 revealed Thanchanok Tinsulanonda and Ratapirom Bandapraneat had joined the cast. On 21 May 2026, it was revealed that the series received a funding grant from the Department of Cultural Promotion of the Ministry of Culture. Filming for the series officially concluded on 6 July 2026.

== Fan meetings ==
Year	Title	Date	Venue	Ref.
2026	Match Point: The First Match	26 July 2026	World Max Cinema, SF World Cinema, CentralWorld	
2026	Match Point: Message Box	29 September 2026	Union Hall, Union Mall	

=== Cancelled events ===
On August 22, 2026, GMMTV released a statement that "due to heavy rain and flooding in Bangkok and many other areas of Thailand, travel and public safety have been affected" and that the Match Point Final EP. Fan Meeting event had been cancelled due to safety concerns.

Year	Title	Date	Venue	Ref.
2026	Match Point Final EP. Fan Meeting	27 September 2026	Siam Pavalai Royal Grand Theater, Siam Paragon	
