= My Dear Gangster Oppa =

2023 Thai television series

- Thai: พี่นักเลงที่รัก
- Literally: My Dear Gangster Oppa
- Genre: Romantic drama; Romantic comedy; Boys' love
- Based on: Korean webtoon My Dear Gangster Oppa
- Directed by: Jade Bunyoprakarn
- Starring: Nichakoon Khajornborirak; Krittanun Aunchananun; Tanatat Kunaneksin; Charupob Ruangsuwan
- Country of origin: Thailand
- Original language: Thai
- No. of episodes: 8

Production
- Running time: 45 minutes

Original release
- Network: iQIYI
- Release: 26 October – 14 December 2023

My Dear Gangster Oppa (Thai: พี่นักเลงที่รัก) is a 2023 Thai television series in the romantic drama, romantic comedy and boys' love (BL) genres, directed by Dome Jade Bunyoprakarn and starring Nichakoon Khajornborirak (Meen) and Krittanun Aunchananun (Ping). The series is based on a Korean webtoon of the same name.

The series aired from 26 October to 14 December 2023, with weekly episodes on Thursdays on the iQIYI platform.

== Synopsis ==
Guy (Ping) is a humanities student who has always had trouble fitting in. During high school, he befriended Wal (Winner), who became his only close friend. Over time, Guy fell in love with Wal but never had the courage to confess. On Wal's birthday, Guy finally decides to declare his feelings, only to find out that Wal already has a girlfriend.

To get over his disappointment, Guy retreats into the world of online gaming. He starts playing "The Legend of Saga" and meets a character named Yuri, played by Thiu (Meen). The two grow close in the game, and Guy begins to develop feelings for Yuri, unaware that behind the character is a real-life gangster.

When the in-game friend group arranges a meetup, Guy discovers that Yuri is actually Thiu, a serious and mysterious man who works as a bar manager. Despite the initial shock, the two continue to grow closer, and Guy realizes that Thiu might be the right person to help him move on.

== Cast and characters ==
=== Main ===
- Nichakoon Khajornborirak (Meen) as Thiu
- Krittanun Aunchananun (Ping) as Guy

=== Supporting ===
- Tanatat Kunaneksin (Winner) as Wal
- Charupob Ruangsuwan (Tommy) as Kenji
- Setthanan Manunapichu (Paam) as Tom
- Yosita Wasuphiruk (Yoghurt) as Muffin
- Nitta Pinyadar Salinvarradar (Nitta) as Phai
- Nunnapat Songsakseree (Tonlew) as Nami
- Tinn Boonpongthong (Tinn) as Tul
- Cosmo Milis (Cosmo) as Boss
- Anon Saisangcharn (Pu) as Phaibul

== Soundtrack ==
My Dear Gangster Oppa Original Soundtrack
No.	Title	Artist	Length
1.	"ที่ของเรา (Area)" (Main theme song)	Nichakoon Khajornborirak (Meen) and Krittanun Aunchananun (Ping)
2.	"ทางไหนดี (What If)" (Insert song)	Krittanun Aunchananun (Ping))

== Production ==
The series was produced by iQIYI in partnership with DnD and directed by Dome Jade Bunyoprakarn. It is based on the Korean webtoon My Dear Gangster Oppa.. A blessing ceremony was held before filming began, with the main cast and crew in attendance.

The official trailer was released before the premiere.

== Release and reception ==
The series premiered on 26 October 2023 on the iQIYI platform, with weekly episodes on Thursdays. The final episode aired on 14 December 2023.

According to Thai newspaper Naewna, the hashtag #GangsterOppaEP1 reached No. 1 on X (formerly Twitter) in Thailand and No. 8 worldwide following the broadcast of the first episode. The second episode also reached No. 1 on X in Thailand, while the series ranked No. 1 on iQIYI's trending series chart for two consecutive weeks.

The series received positive audience response on streaming platforms. On MyDramaList, the series holds a user rating of 7.1/10 based on more than 11,000 user ratings. On iQIYI, the series received a score of 9.7/10 from more than 37,000 users.

== Marketing and events ==
To celebrate the finale, a special screening event titled MY DEAR GANGSTER OPPA FINAL EP. was held on 14 December 2023 at Earthlab Cinema in CentralWorld, Bangkok, featuring appearances by the main cast.
