= The Rebound (Thai TV series) =

2024 Thai television series

- Thai: เกมนี้เพื่อนาย
- Literally: The Rebound
- Genre: Romantic drama; Romantic comedy; Boys' love; Sports (basketball)
- Directed by: Tanwarin Sukkhapisit (Golf)
- Starring: Meen Nichakoon Khajornborirak; Ping Krittanun Aunchananun; Chin Chinawut Indracusin; Frank Thanatsaran Samthonglai; Nammon Krittanai Asanprakit; Emi Thasorn Klinnium
- Country of origin: Thailand
- Original language: Thai
- No. of episodes: 12

Production
- Executive producer: Natthakorn Julrasorn (Brook)
- Cinematography: Suthipong Teerasakul
- Editor: Apirak Chaipanha (Yokee)
- Running time: 50 minutes

Original release
- Network: Viu
- Release: 26 June – 1 August 2024

The Rebound (Thai: เกมนี้เพื่อนาย) is a 2024 Thai television series in the romantic drama, romantic comedy and boys' love (BL) genres, with a basketball theme. The series stars Meen Nichakoon Khajornborirak and Ping Krittanun Aunchananun in the lead roles.

The series aired from 26 June to 1 August 2024, with weekly episodes on Wednesdays and Thursdays on the Viu platform. It is also available internationally on GagaOOLala.

== Synopsis ==
Zen (Ping) is a high school student struggling to earn a scholarship and escape poverty. His dream is threatened when a veteran member of the basketball team is caught using drugs, and the school announces its intention to dissolve the club. Determined not to give up, Zen needs to find new teammates and a coach for the qualifying round.

Ryu (Meen) and Zen were once best friends, but grew apart. Despite their differences, they reunite because of basketball. Ryu, a street basketball player, is confused and hesitant to admit his feelings for team captain Zen. As they train together, their relationship evolves beyond friendship.

== Cast ==
=== Main ===
- Nichakoon Khajornborirak (Meen) as Ryu
- Krittanun Aunchananun (Ping) as Zen

=== Supporting ===
- Chin Chinawut Indracusin (Chin) as Coach Ton
- Frank Thanatsaran Samthonglai (Frank) as Atom
- Nammon Krittanai Asanprakit (Nammon) as Que
- Emi Thasorn Klinnium (Emi) as Lin
- Earth Nanthawat Phaiboonphattana (Earth) as First
- Joke Chaloemdet Thammawut (Joke) as Prince
- VJ Nopparoot Tanthanawikrai (VJ) as Shogun
- Boss Wasupol Panyalertprapha (Boss) as Jedi
- Perth Napat Rueangchaisiwawet (Perth) as Tle
- Bom Panupong Janchai (Bom) as Kao
- Non Ratchanon Kanpiang (Non) as Jet
- Pass Patcharapon Santiporn (Pass) as Tos

=== Guest ===
- Golf Tanwarin Sukkhapisit (Golf) as owner of "Café for All" (Ep. 1)
- Theme Phubeth Atarunwong (Theme) as senior basketball player (Ep. 1)
- Nong Natchukorn Maikan (Nong) as Ryu's father (Ep. 3)
- Yai Vacharakiat Boonphakdee (Yai) as Atom's father (Ep. 5)
- Tom Jakkrit Yompayorm (Tom) as sports commentator (Ep. 6)
- Earth Nirodha Ruencharoen (Earth) as sports commentator (Ep. 6)
- Jum Amata Piyavanich (Jum) as Ryu's mother (Ep. 8)

== Production ==
The series was directed by Tanwarin Sukkhapisit (Golf), with executive production by Natthakorn Julrasorn (Brook). A blessing ceremony was held before filming began.

== Release and reception ==
The series premiered on 26 June 2024 on Viu, with weekly episodes on Wednesdays and Thursdays. The final episode aired on 1 August 2024. A premiere event ("The Rebound First Premiere") was held on 25 June 2024 at Major Cineplex Sukhumvit in Bangkok. A closing event ("The Rebound Final Ep. Fan Meeting") was held on 1 August 2024 at Major Cineplex Ratchayothin in Bangkok.

The series is also available internationally on GagaOOLala.

== Soundtrack ==
Title	Artist	Ref.
"The Rebound"	Maiyarap	

== Events ==
Year	Date	Title	Location	Ref.
2024	25 June	The Rebound First Premiere	Major Cineplex Sukhumvit, Bangkok, Thailand	
2024	1 August	The Rebound Final Ep. Fan Meeting	Major Cineplex Ratchayothin, Bangkok, Thailand	
