= Nichakoon Khajornborirak =

Thai actor, model and basketball player (born 1999)

- นิชคุณ ขจรบริรักษ์
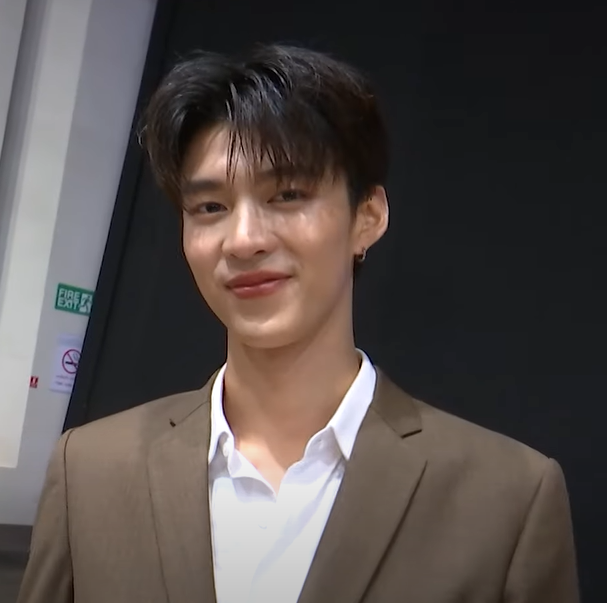
- Nichakoon in October 2023
- Born: 3 March 1999 (age 27); Nan province, Thailand
- Other name: Meen (มีน)
- Education: Bangkok University
- Occupations: Actor; basketball player
- Years active: 2020–present
- Agent(s): Mchoice (2020–present); Channel 3 (2022–2025)
- Height: 1.95 m (6 ft 5 in)

Nichakoon Khajornborirak (Thai: นิชคุณ ขจรบริรักษ์; born 3 March 1999), nicknamed Meen (Thai: มีน), is a Thai actor and basketball player. He made his acting debut in 2020 in Love by Chance 2, where he was paired with Supha Sangaworawong (Est). In 2022, he was paired with Krittanun Aunchananun (Ping), starring in the series Ai Long Nhai. He also starred with Ping in My Dear Gangster Oppa (2023) and The Rebound (2024). In 2025, he starred in the series When the Sun Lifts its Head, It Will Be Time for the Stars on Channel 3.

== Early life and education ==
Nichakoon was born in Nan province, Thailand. He is the eldest child and has one younger brother. He completed elementary school at Pua School and high school at Assumption College Thonburi. He graduated with a degree in International Communication (Public Relations and Advertising) from Bangkok University.

Meen is a basketball player. He was a champion at the National Youth Games representing Bangkok and played for his university basketball team. He is currently an athlete for the Hi-Tech.

== Career ==
Meen entered the entertainment industry after a talent scout approached him while he was walking in Siam Square. He started by walking for various brands and fashion weeks. In 2020, he made his acting debut in the series A Chance to Love. In 2021, he appeared in the series Praomook.

In 2022, Meen gained recognition as the lead in the BL series Ai Long Nhai, alongside Krittanun Aunchananun (Ping). The same year, he signed a contract with Channel 3.

In 2023, he made his debut on Channel 3 with the series Dujapsorn, part of the Duangjai Thewaprom series, a continuation of Suphapburut Juthathep. He later appeared in Rak Tham Thung and When the Sun Lifts its Head, It Will Be Time for the Stars.

== Filmography ==
=== Television series ===
Year	Title	Role	Network
2020	Love by Chance 2	Tul Meshanan	WeTV
2021	Praomook	Phum	Channel 3 HD
2022	Ai Long Nhai	Ai Yaret (Ai)	Channel 3 HD
2023	My Dear Gangster Oppa	Thiu	iQIYI
2024	Rak Tham Thung	"Te" Temon Khokhongcharoen	Channel 3 HD
2024	Duangjai Thewaprom: Lochanchan	"Wit" Chawit Wanitman Khong (Guest)	Channel 3 HD
2024	Duangjai Thewaprom: Dujapsorn	"With" Chawit Wanitman Khong	Channel 3 HD
2024	Duangjai Thewaprom: Pornchiwan	"With" Chawit Wanitman Khong	Channel 3 HD
2024	The Rebound	Ryu	Viu
2025	When the Sun Lifts its Head, It Will Be Time for the Stars	"Wi" Pathawi Borwinit	Channel 3 HD
2026	Ban Son Sip		True Visions Now

=== Film ===
Year	Title	Role	Production
2025	The Tutor: Phi Wan Ma Son (The TuTor พี่วรรณมาสอน)	Nattaphak Chaowakornkun (Best)	VeryGreat

=== Music videos ===
Year	Title	Artist
2019	"Wela Khrai Tham" (Your Answer)	Worranit Thawornwong (Mook)
2023	"Thang Nai Di"	Ping Krittanun Aunchananun
2024	"Fung Jai"	Bow Maylada
2024	"Phuean Teuan Laew" (Ignore)	JMNK
2024	"Choose Me"	Koy, Nuttie, Dream
2024	"Thuk Wan Wela" (Always)	JOH
2026	"Aep Rak Dai Sombun Baep"	INK WARUNTORN
2026	"Watthu Mafai" (LAST SUPPER)	Chrrissa

== Discography ==
- "Bangoei Rak" – with Thanapon Sukhumphanasan, Kirati Puangmalee, Siwat Chamlongkul, Peerawit Atchitstaporn, Ratthawit Kitcharoenlak (Ost. A Chance to Love 2)
- "Yut Rak Yang Ngai Wai" – with Ping Krittanun Aunchananun
- "Hai Kan Dai Mai Thoe?" – with Ping Krittanun Aunchananun
- "Thi Khong Rao" – with Ping Krittanun Aunchananun (Ost. My Dear Gangster Oppa)

== Fan events ==
- MeenPing Now & Forever Fan Meeting
- Duangjai Thewaprom Sports Day
- Nichakoon A Meeningful Moment – 1st Photobook Fansign Event

== Sports achievements ==
- Champion of 3x3 tournament (2016)
- Champion of the National Youth Games (33rd edition, Chumphon province) – representing Bangkok
- Champion of the Invitational Tournament at Assumption College Thonburi (2017)
- Champion of the ASEAN School Games (2017, Singapore) – Thailand national team

== Awards and nominations ==
Year	Award	Category	Work	Result
2023	The Most Favorite Actor 2023	Most Popular Actor	Ai Long Nhai	Won
2024	Kazz Awards 2024	Rising Star of the Year (Male)	—	Won
2024	Thailand Digital Awards 2024	Outstanding Couple Promoting Sports (with Ping Krittanun)	The Rebound	Won
2025	Thai Update Awards 2025	Best Couple (with Ping Krittanun)	—	Won
2025	Lifestyle Asia Thailand 50 Icons 2025	Entertainment Leaders	—	Won
2025	Maya TV Awards 2025	Rising Star (Male)	—	Nominated
