= CentralWorld =

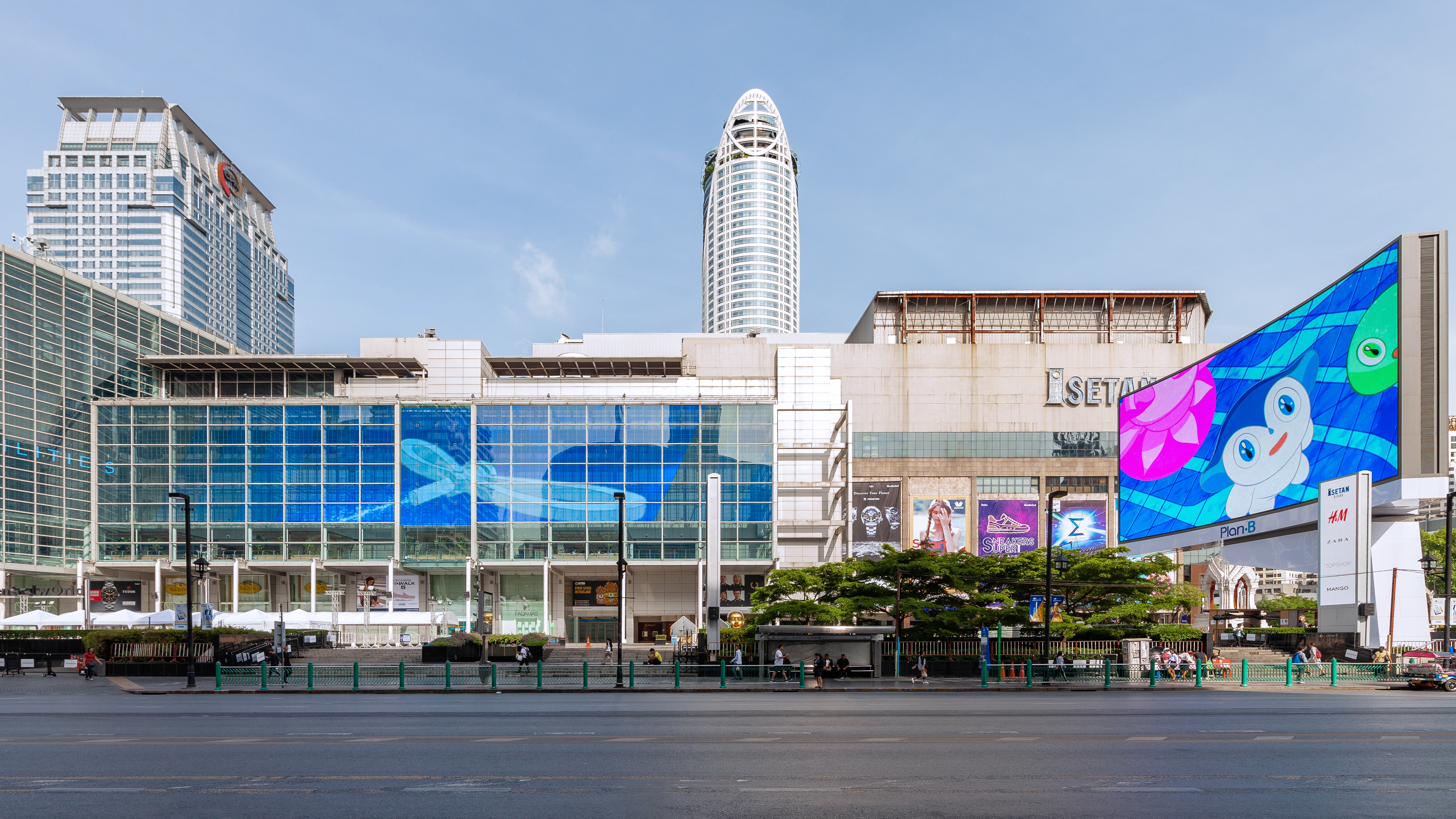
- Exterior of CentralWorld in 2019
- Location: Pathum Wan, Bangkok, Thailand
- Coordinates: 13°44′49″N 100°32′23″E
- Address: 999/9 Rama I Road
- Opened: 3 December 1989; 36 years ago (World Trade Center); 23 December 2002; 23 years ago (Central World Plaza); 8 November 2007; 19 years ago (CentralWorld)
- Developer: Central Pattana
- Owner: Crown Property Bureau; TBF4
- Architect: Altoon + Porter Architects LLP
- Num. of stores: 495
- Num. of anchor tenants: 7
- Floor area: 187,046 square metres (2,013,346.39 sq ft)
- Floors: 7
- Parking: 7,000
- Public transit: Siam BTS Station; Chit Lom BTS station
- Website: centralworld.co.th/en/home
- Other facts and statistics about CentralWorld: Renovated opening date: 21 July 2006; GFA of shopping mall: 550,000 square metres (5,920,150.73 sq ft) include: GLA of stores rental: 409,500 square metres (4,407,821.32 sq ft); GFA of 5-star hotel (exclude convention center): 90,000 square metres (968,751.94 sq ft); GFA of convention center: 17,000 square metres (182,986.48 sq ft); GFA of office tower: 80,000 square metres (861,112.83 sq ft); GFA of indoor parking structure and parking underground of shopping mall and office tower: 287,000 square metres (3,089,242.29 sq ft); No. of floors in CentralWorld complex: Shopping mall (zones A–C): 7; Shopping mall (zones D, I): 8; Shopping mall (zone E): 3; Shopping mall (zone F—excluding cineplex and indoor parking structure): 3; Shopping mall (zone F—only cineplex): 4; Shopping mall (zone F—only indoor parking structure): ~20; Central tower (Central Department Store and Central Tower @ CentralWorld): 20; Isetan tower: 8 (to be renamed in 2021); Office tower: 45; Hotel tower (include convention center): 57; Convention center (part of 5-star hotel tower): 4; Parking underground of shopping mall and office tower: 2

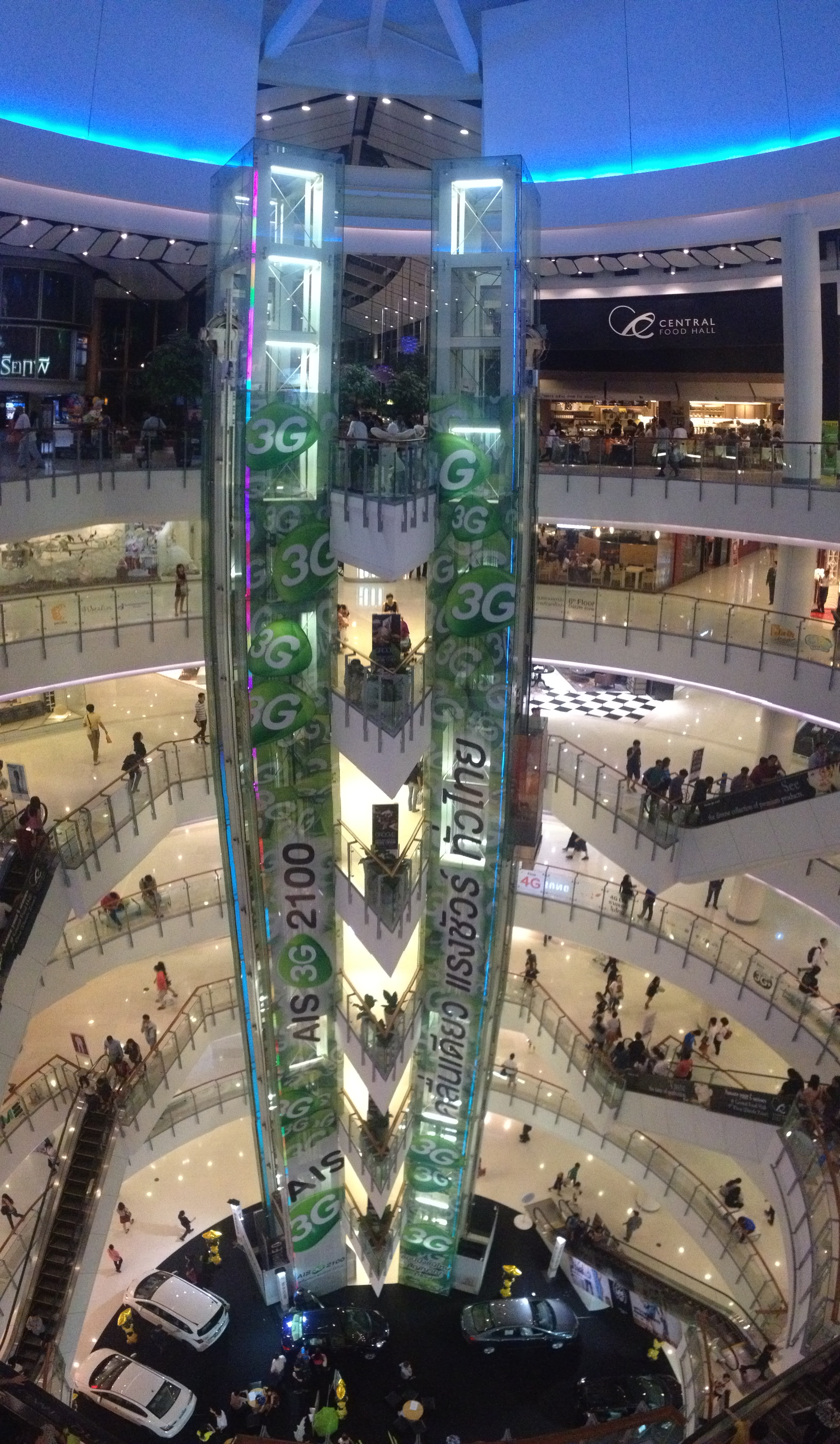
Central Dome

CentralWorld (Thai: เซ็นทรัลเวิลด์, styled as centralwOrld), is a shopping plaza and complex in the Siam area of Bangkok, in Thailand, opened in 1989. It is the ninth-largest shopping center in the world. The complex, which includes a hotel and office tower, is owned by Central Pattana. In 2006, after three years of design and renovation, CentralWorld was expanded to 550,000 m^{2} (5,900,000 sq ft) of shopping mall and 830,000 m^{2} (8,900,000 sq ft) of remaining complex, topping nearby rival Siam Paragon in terms of size.

== History ==
=== Original name ===
The mall opened in 1989 as the World Trade Center. Central Group acquired the property in 2002 from the Wang Phetchabun group and changed the name to Central World Plaza. In 2007, it was renamed CentralWorld. It is on leased Crown Property Bureau land. In its acquisition, the Central Group's property development arm, Central Pattana (SET: CPN), secured a new 30-year lease on the site.

=== Renovations ===
Anticipating the opening of the luxury Siam Paragon, CPN started massive renovations and expansion on the site in 2002. The original mall structure was 300,000 square metres (3,200,000 sq ft), and the expansion plans boosted that to 430,000 square metres (4,600,000 sq ft). Though work was not yet complete, CPN held an official opening of the renovated complex on 21 July 2006; it was expected to be fully operational by October 2006. By May 2007, the mall was fully opened, but some parts of the upper floors remained vacant. Major exterior construction was ongoing on the hotel in the northwest corner of the mall and the extension floors to the ZEN department store in the southeast corner.

The renovated complex aimed to attract 150,000 customers per day, spending more than 7 billion baht annually. It marketed itself as a middle-class shopping center, as opposed to the upper-class Siam Paragon.

==== Offices at CentralWorld ====
Renovations included completing an unfinished office tower, work on which had been halted in 2003, with only 39 of the planned 63 floors completed. Construction resumed in 2003, expanding the tower to a 45-story, 204-metre (669 ft) design, with the completed tower opening in December 2004.

=== 2010 fire damage ===
CentralWorld was temporarily closed on 19 May 2010 due to severe arson damage, which occurred as troops dislodged protesters from the area during the 2010 political protests. The adjoining Zen section suffered massive damage from rioters.

The Isetan portion was reopened soon after. Following repairs, a large part of CentralWorld was reopened on 28 September that year, with the Zen section reopening on 6 January 2012.

=== Mall renovations 2016–2018 ===
Renovations included enhanced circulation and simplified navigation, the addition of an escalator in zone A, enhanced linkage to the BTS Skytrain, and opening of the second Apple Store in Thailand.

=== 2019 fire and ZEN renamed to Central ===
During the evening rush hour on 10 April 2019, a fire that apparently started elsewhere spread to the eighth floor via air vent pipes, and the mall was ordered evacuated. At least two people, both employees, were reported to have died after jumping from the building.

That December, after three decades, ZEN was renamed to Central after a major revamp costing 1 billion baht.

=== Isetan closure and subsequent renovation ===
On 14 March 2020, Isetan Mitsukoshi Holdings and CPN jointly announced the closure of Isetan Bangkok at CentralWorld as of 31 August 2020, due to the contract expiration.

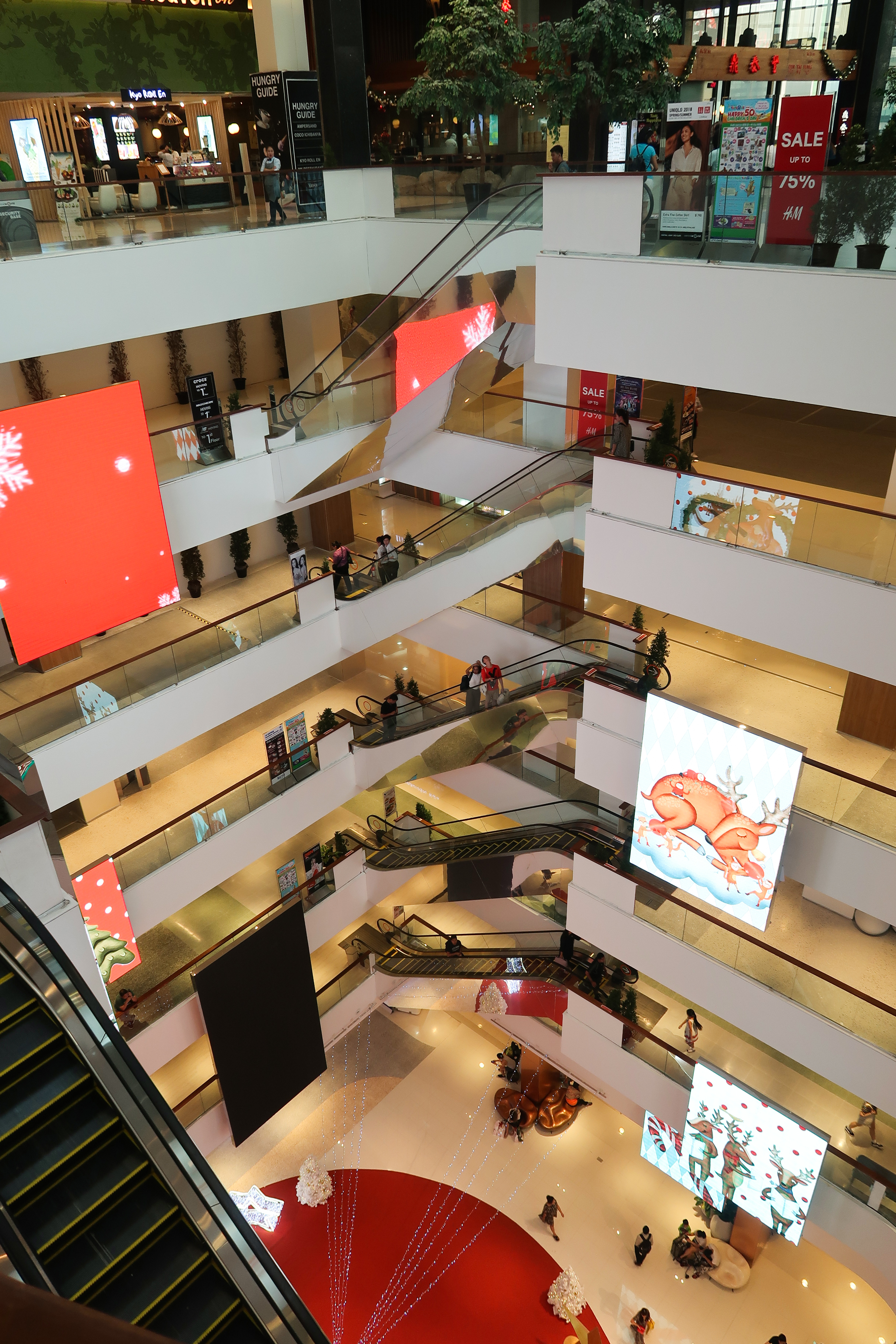
Zone A new atrium

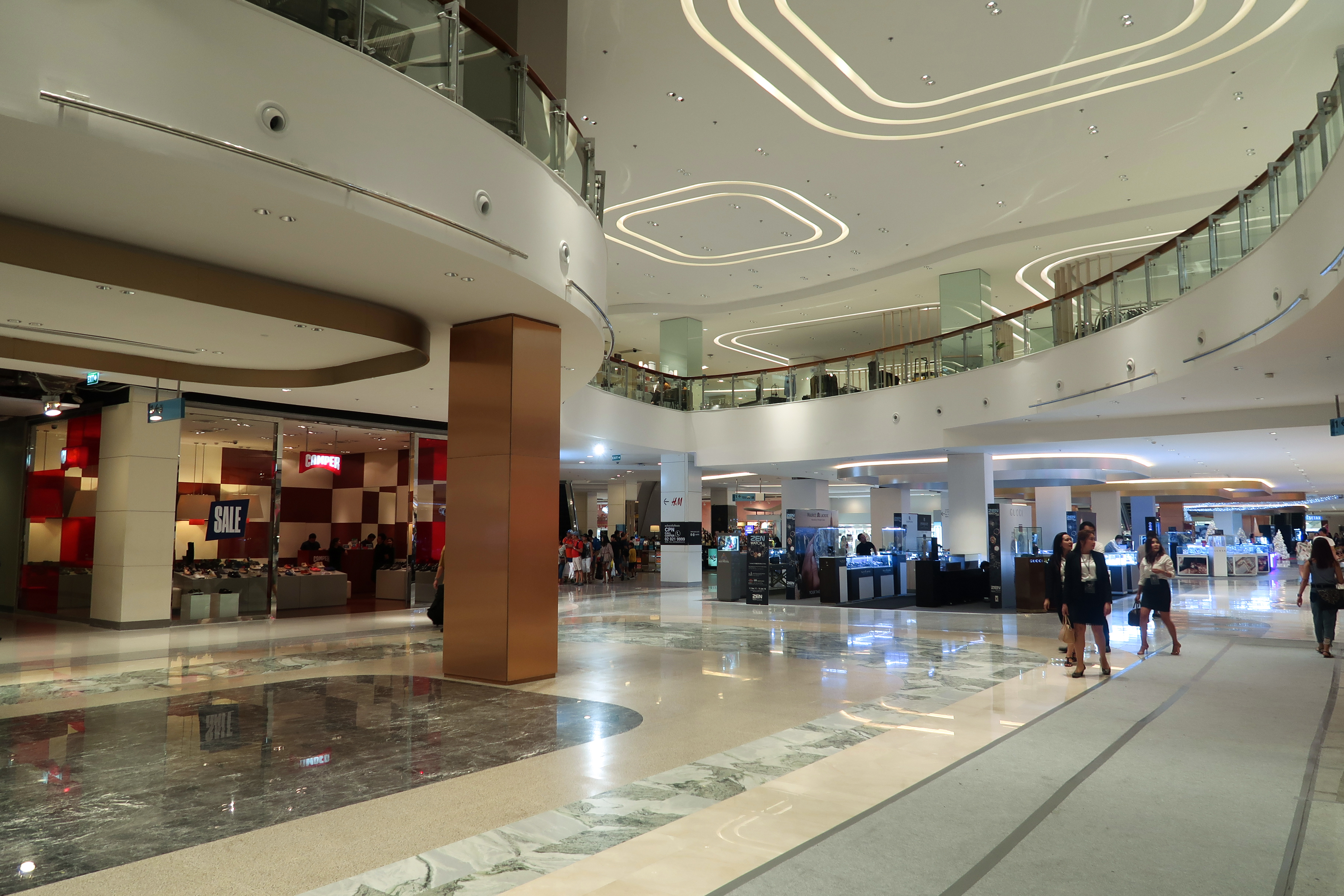
The atrium was removed from levels 1–2

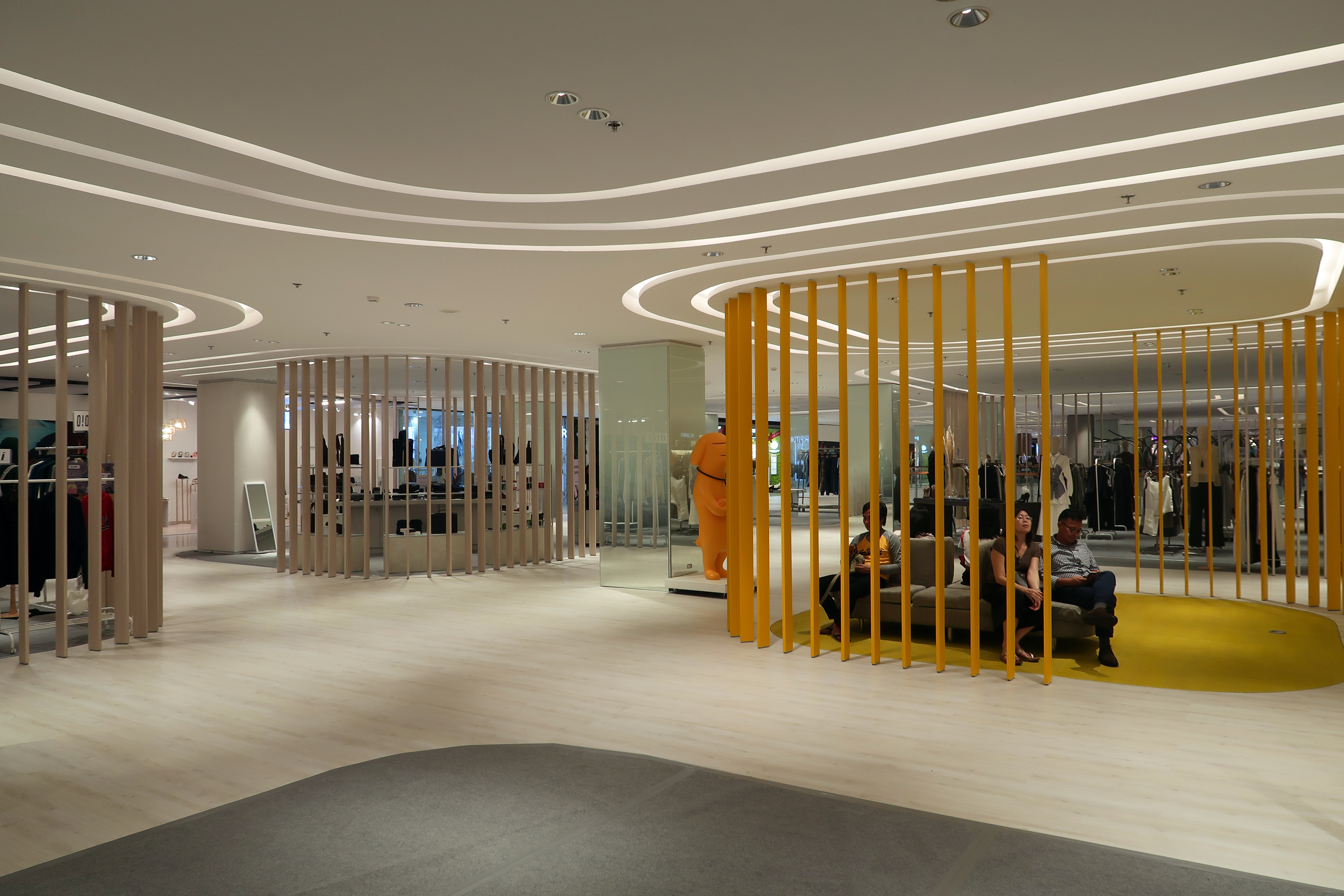
Open shop-front design on level 2

== Location ==
CentralWorld is located in the Pathum Wan District, at the Ratchaprasong intersection, in one of Bangkok's busiest shopping and tourism districts.

== Facilities ==
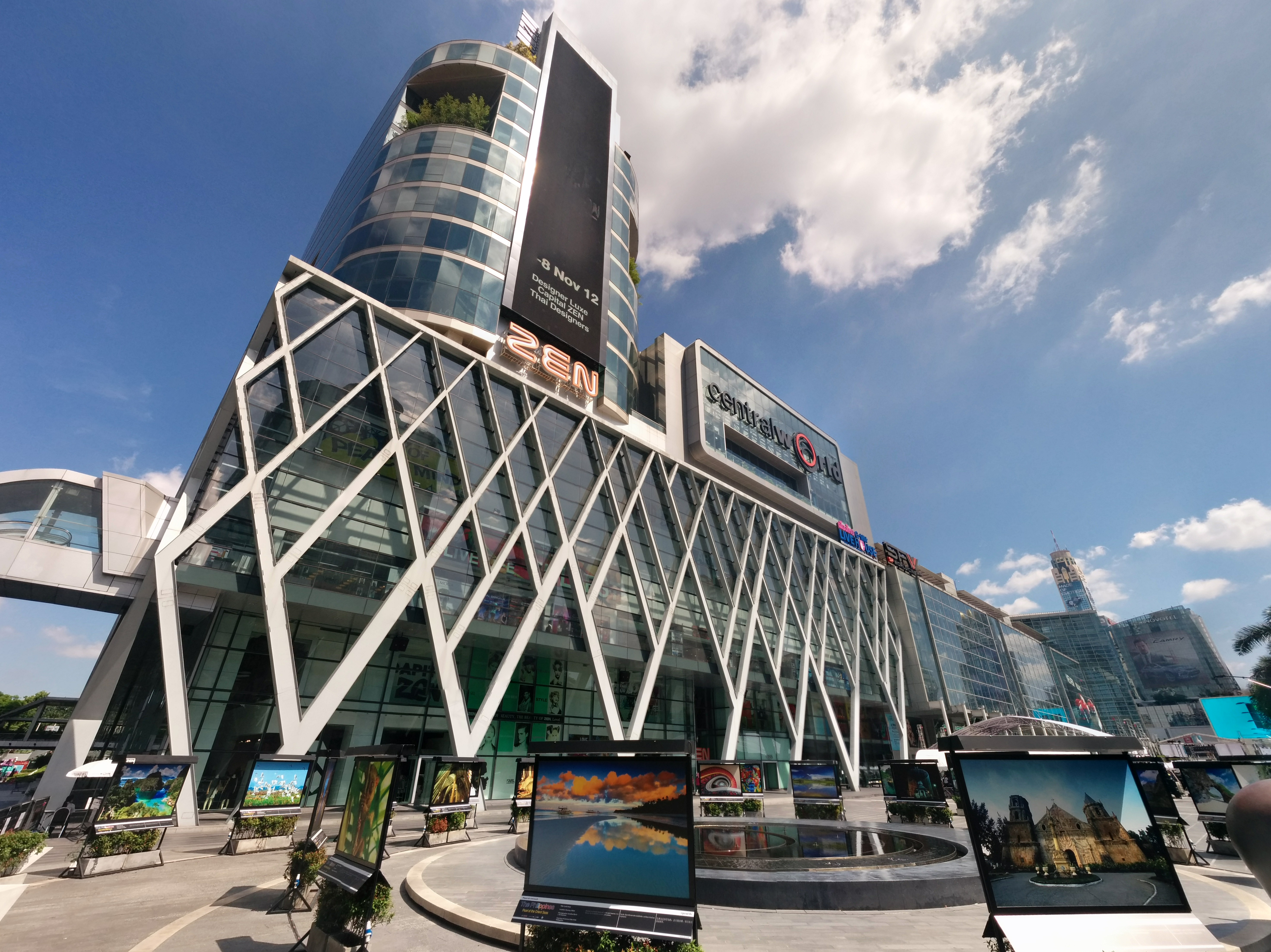
CentralWorld Square

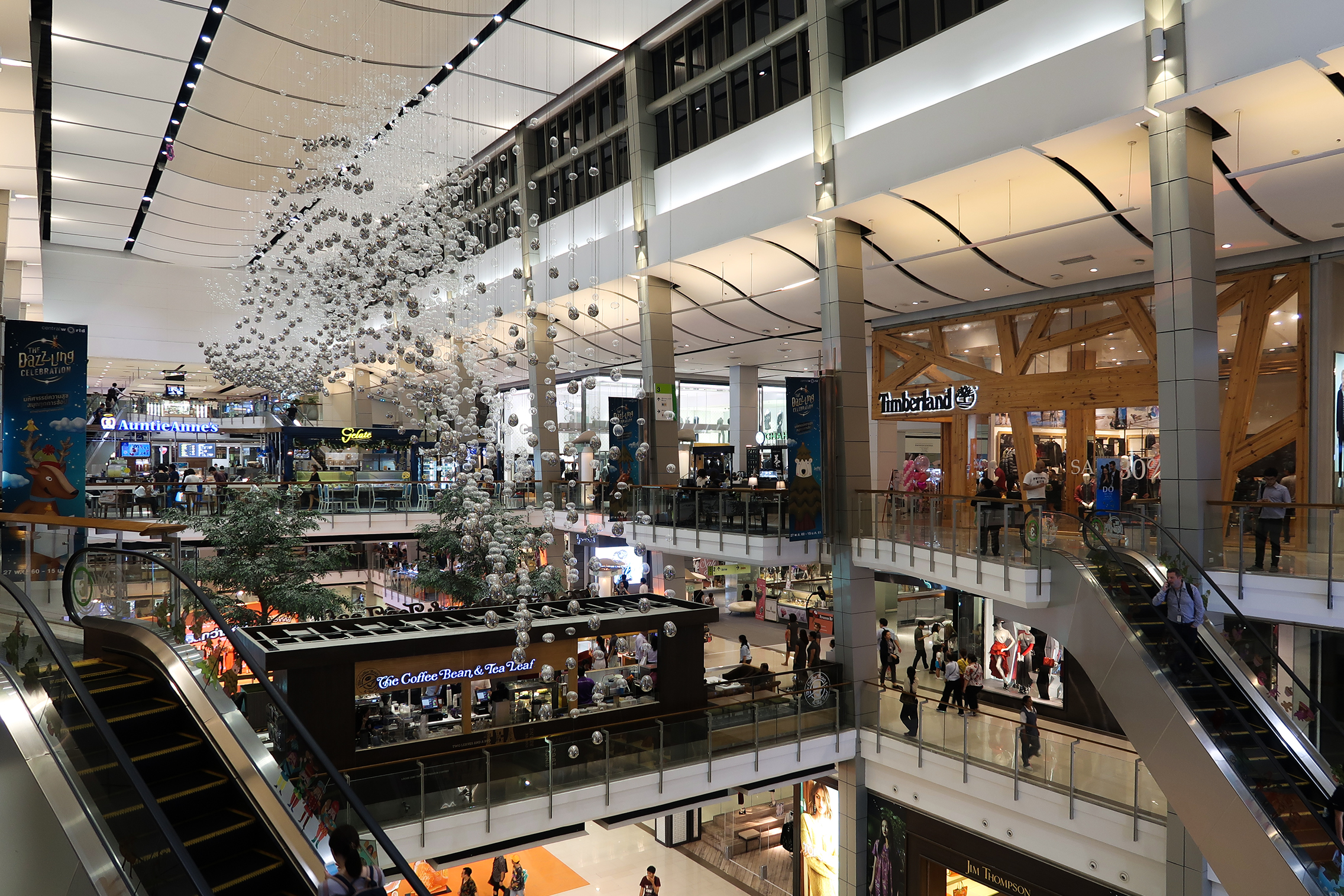
Atrium in 2018

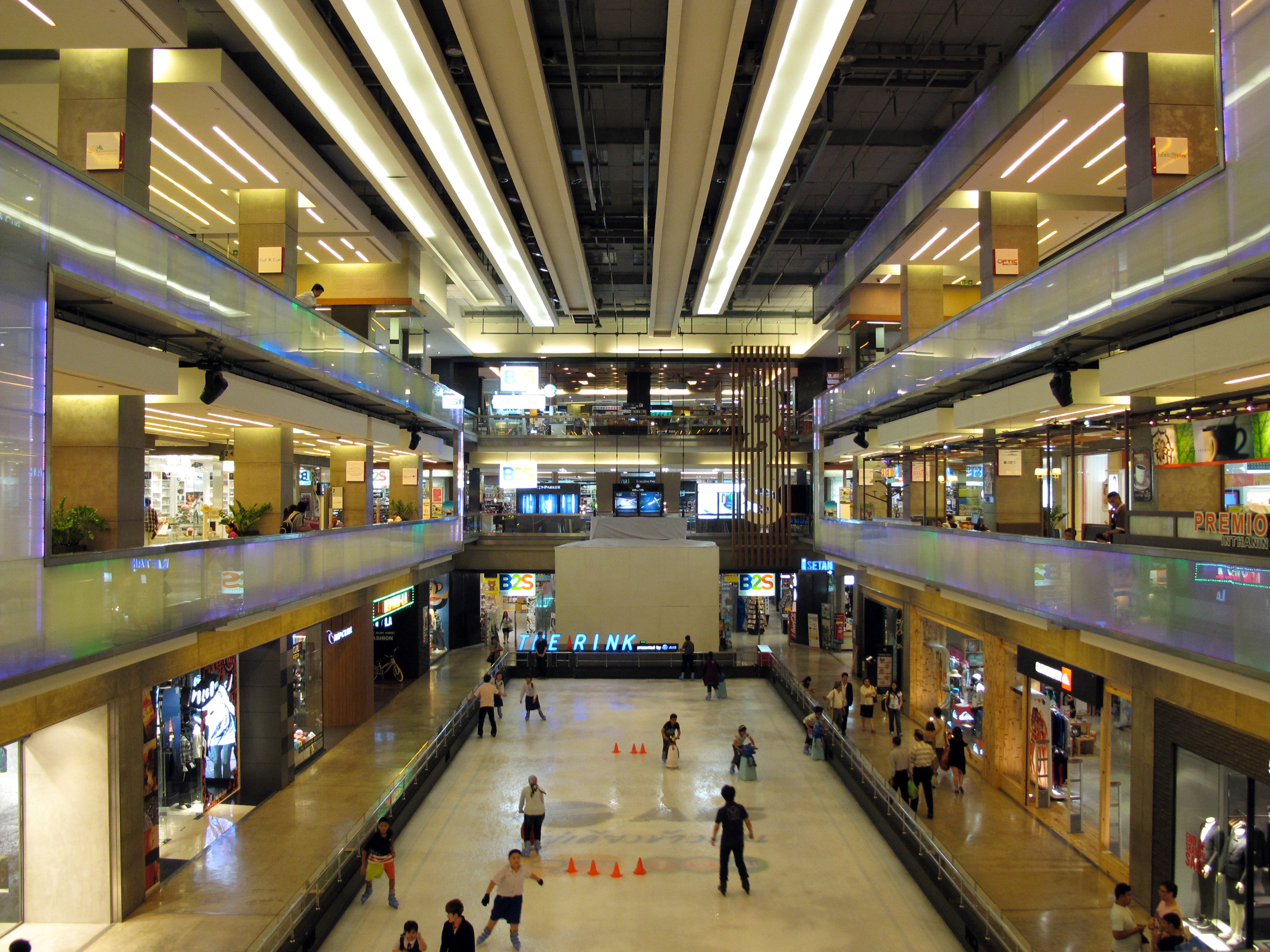
Zone F rink in 2011

=== CentralWorld Square ===
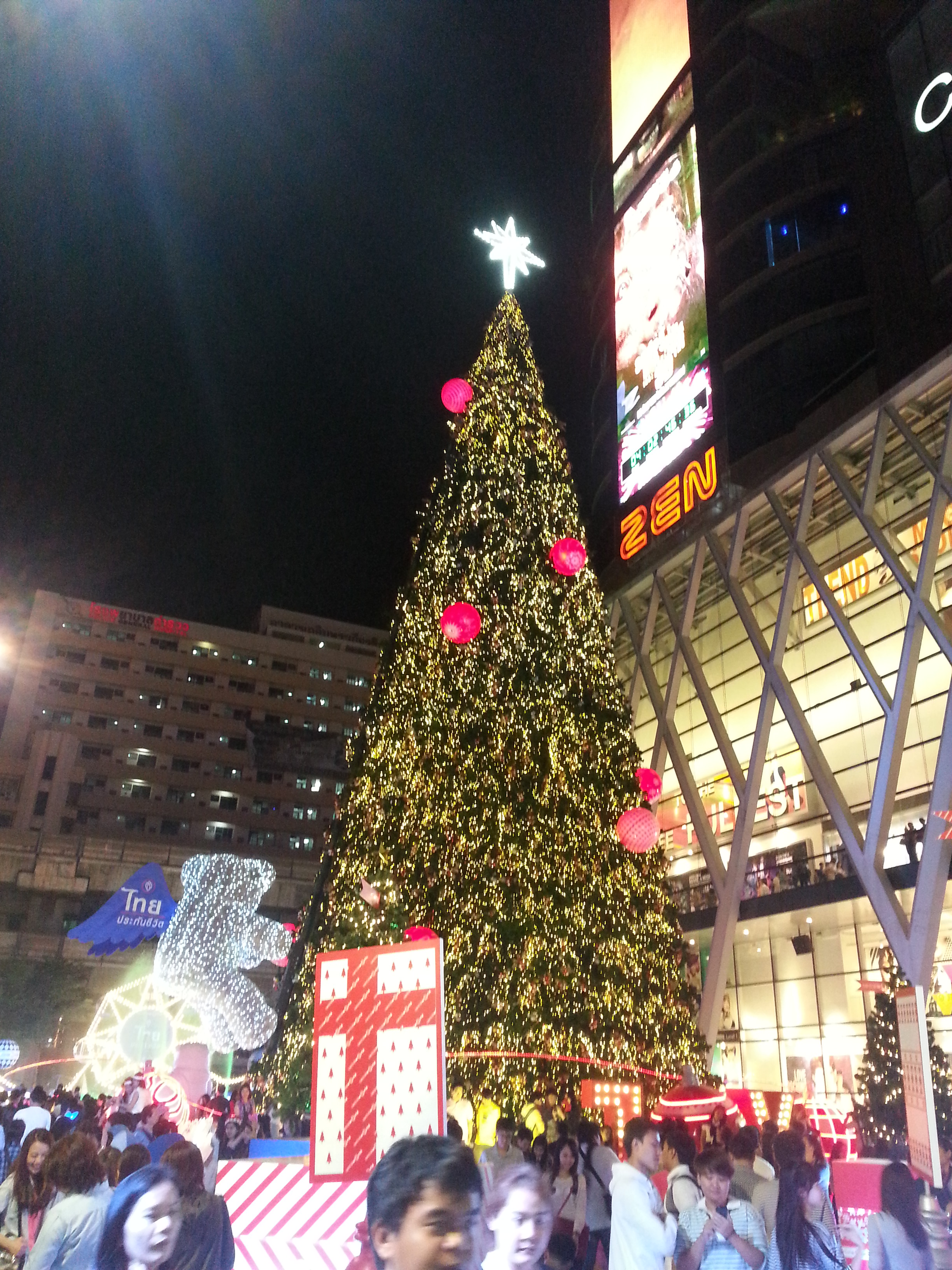
Christmas tree displayed outside of CentralWorld

Outdoor activity square covering an area of 8 square kilometres (3.1 sq mi). In 2020, the Apple Store opened here.

=== CentralWorld Avenue ===
Six-lane road that circles the complex, linking Rama I Road and Ratchadamri Road.

=== Anchors ===
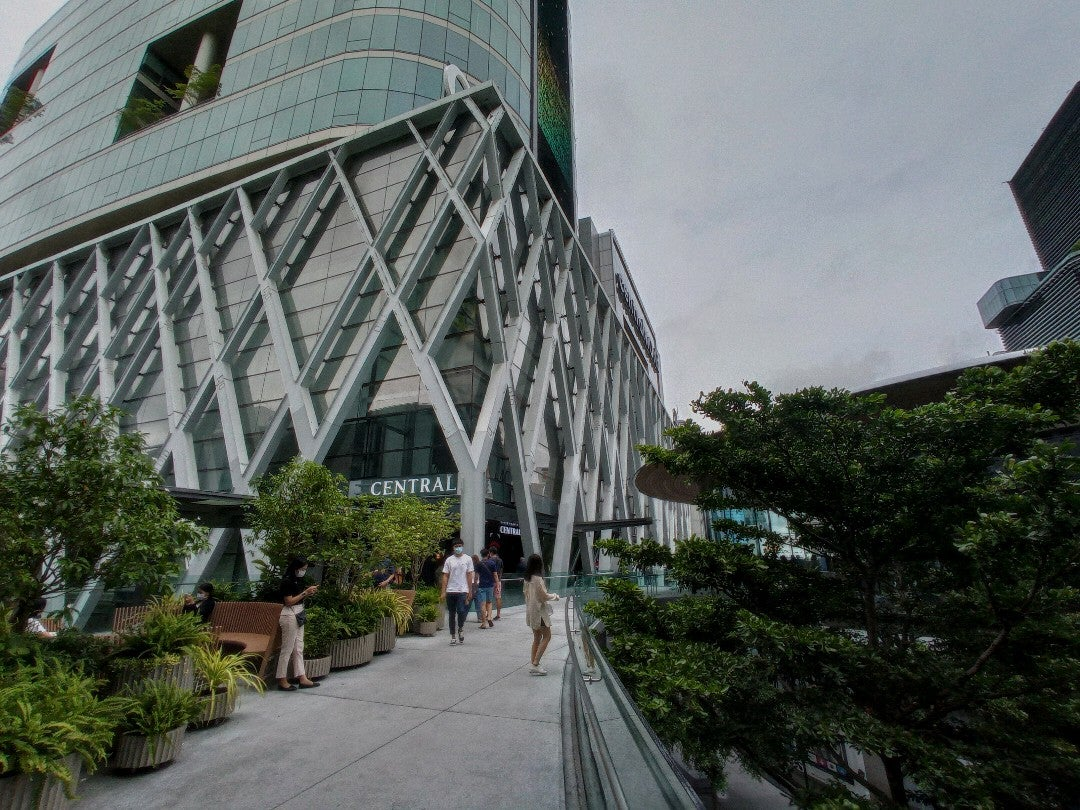
Central Department Store

==== Main anchors ====
- Central Department Store – previously known as Zen, it is the largest branch of the eponymous chain, at 50,000 square metres and seven stories.
- SF World Cinema – upscale cinema complex located on the seventh floor, it has a total of 15 screens and 800 seats. The venue hosted the 2007 and 2008 Bangkok International Film Festival.

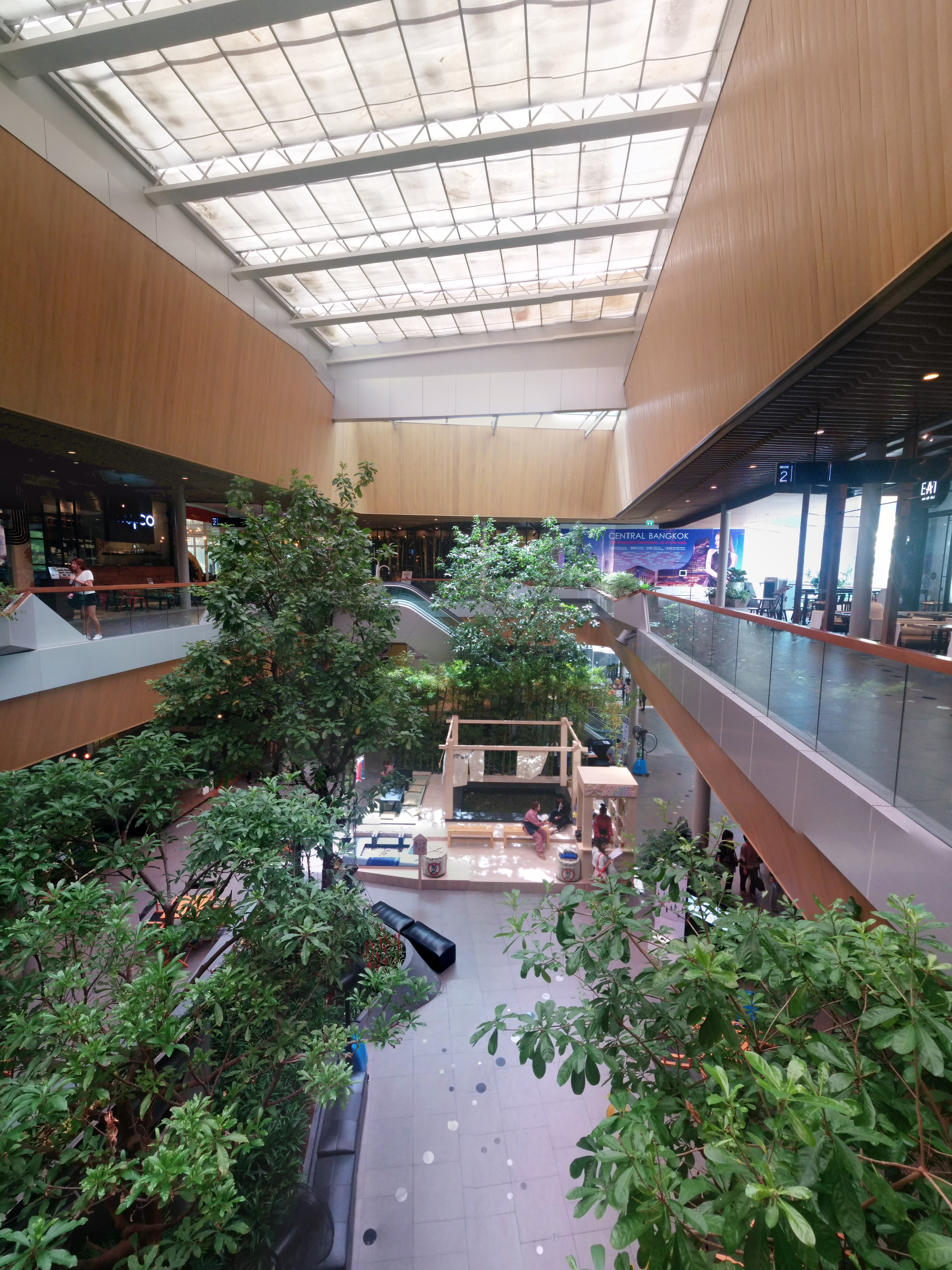
GROOVE at CentralWorld

==== Key tenants ====
- Apple Store – Apple's second store in Thailand
- SuperSports – large sporting equipment store
- PowerBuy x B2S Think Space – flagship branch of the Thailand-based bookstore and electronics store chain
- Tops Food Hall – premium-level supermarket
- SB Design Square – flagship store of S.B. Furniture
- Toys R Us – Thai flagship location of the American toy store

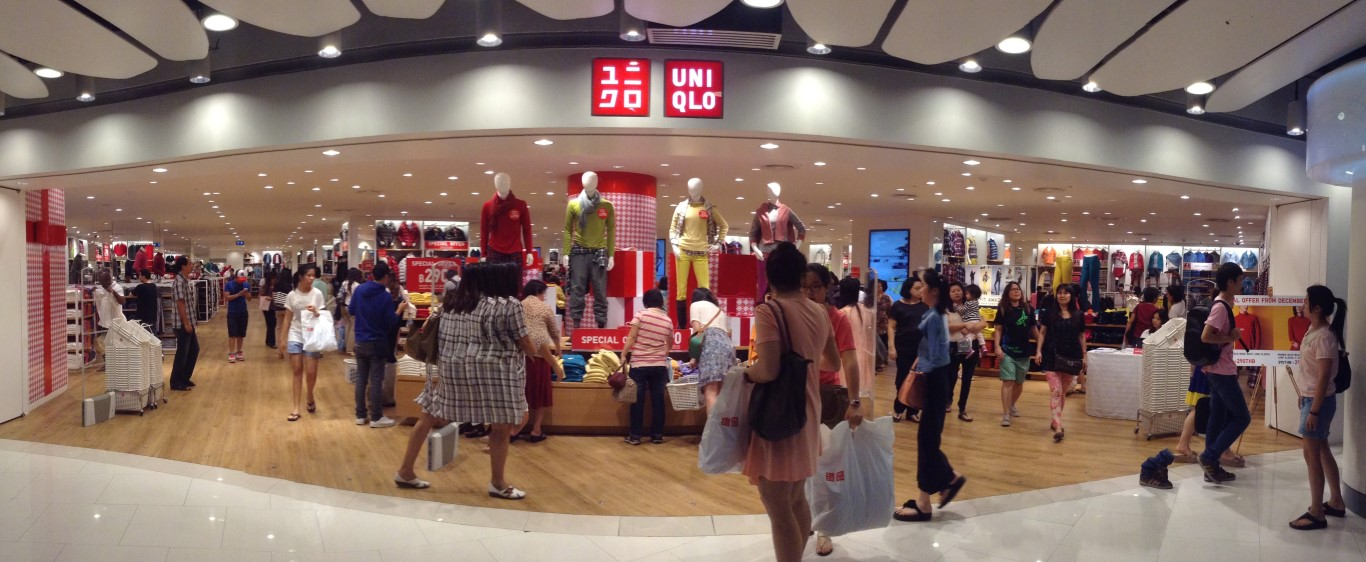
UNIQLO (first store in Thailand)

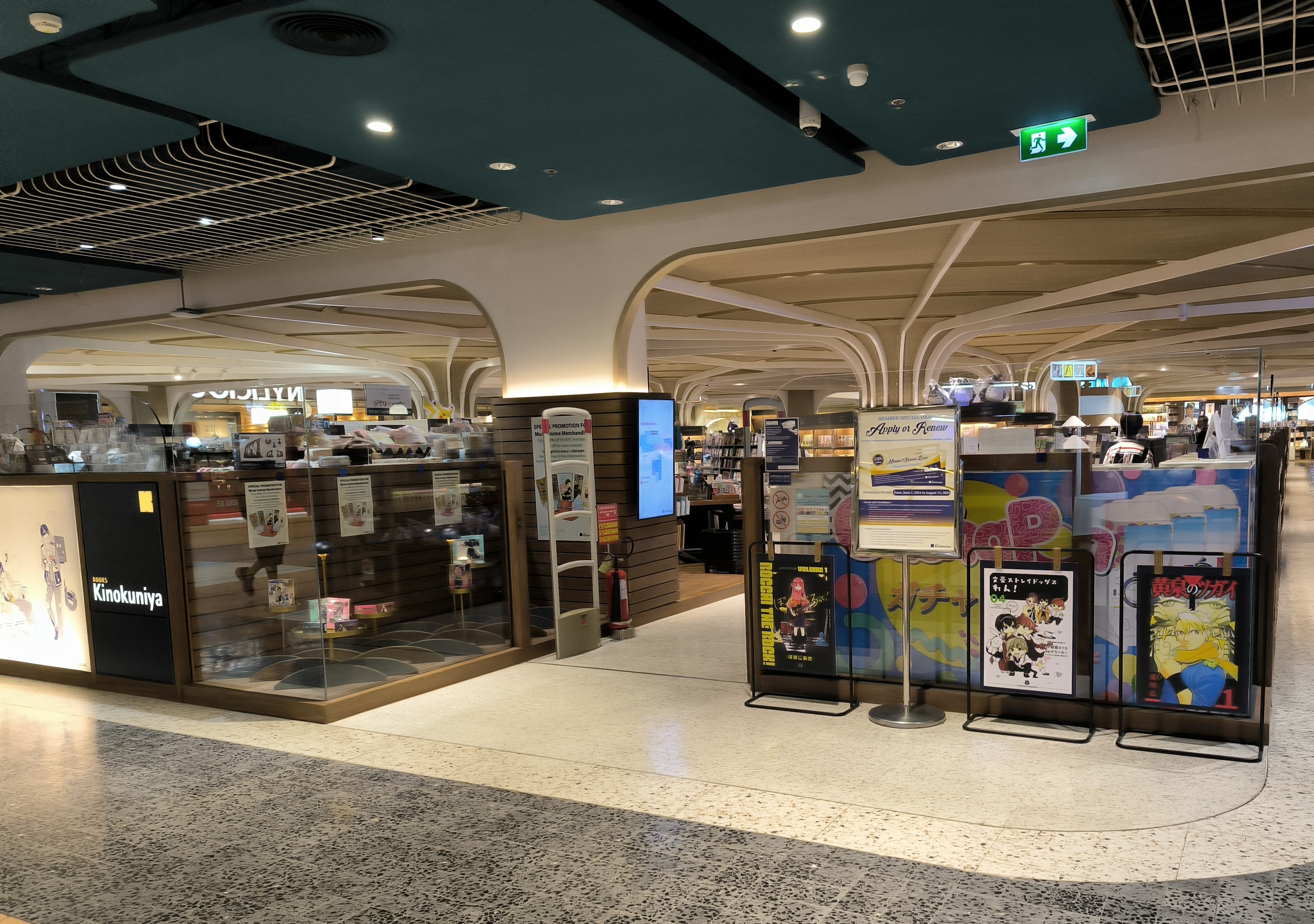
Kinokuniya (first store in Thailand), 2024

- TK Park (Thailand Knowledge Park) – complex that includes a library, internet centres, a 4D movie theatre, and other media facilities. It is owned and operated by the government of Thailand.
- Genius Planet – children's playground, arcade, and various learning centres
- Uniqlo – first Uniqlo store in Thailand
- H&M – clothing store
- The Rink Iceskate – indoor ice skating rink located in the Forum zone on the second floor
- The ZONE by Fitness First – fitness centre
- Kinokuniya – first Kinokuniya store in Thailand
- Nitori – first Nitori store in Thailand
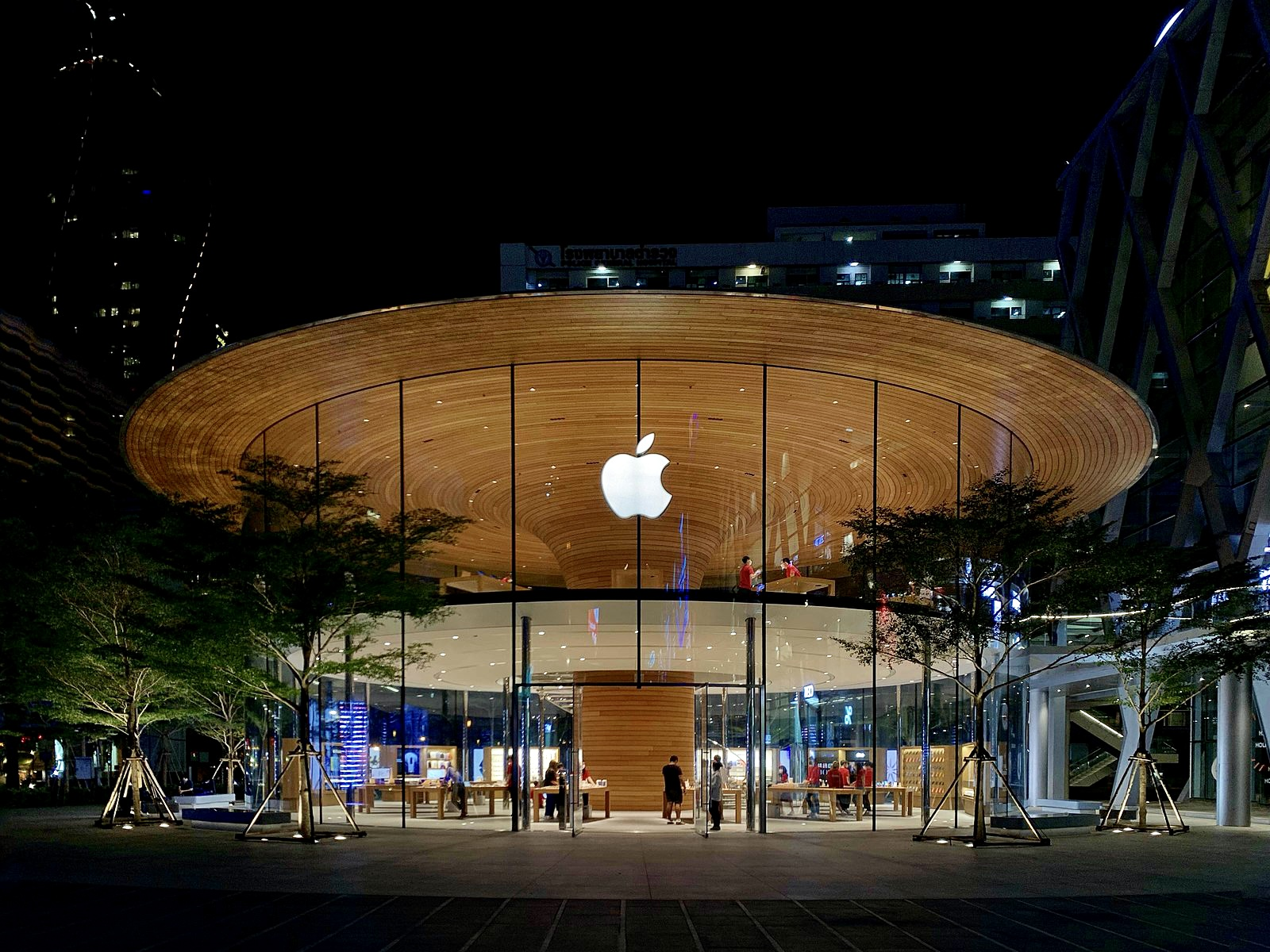
Apple Central World (2022)

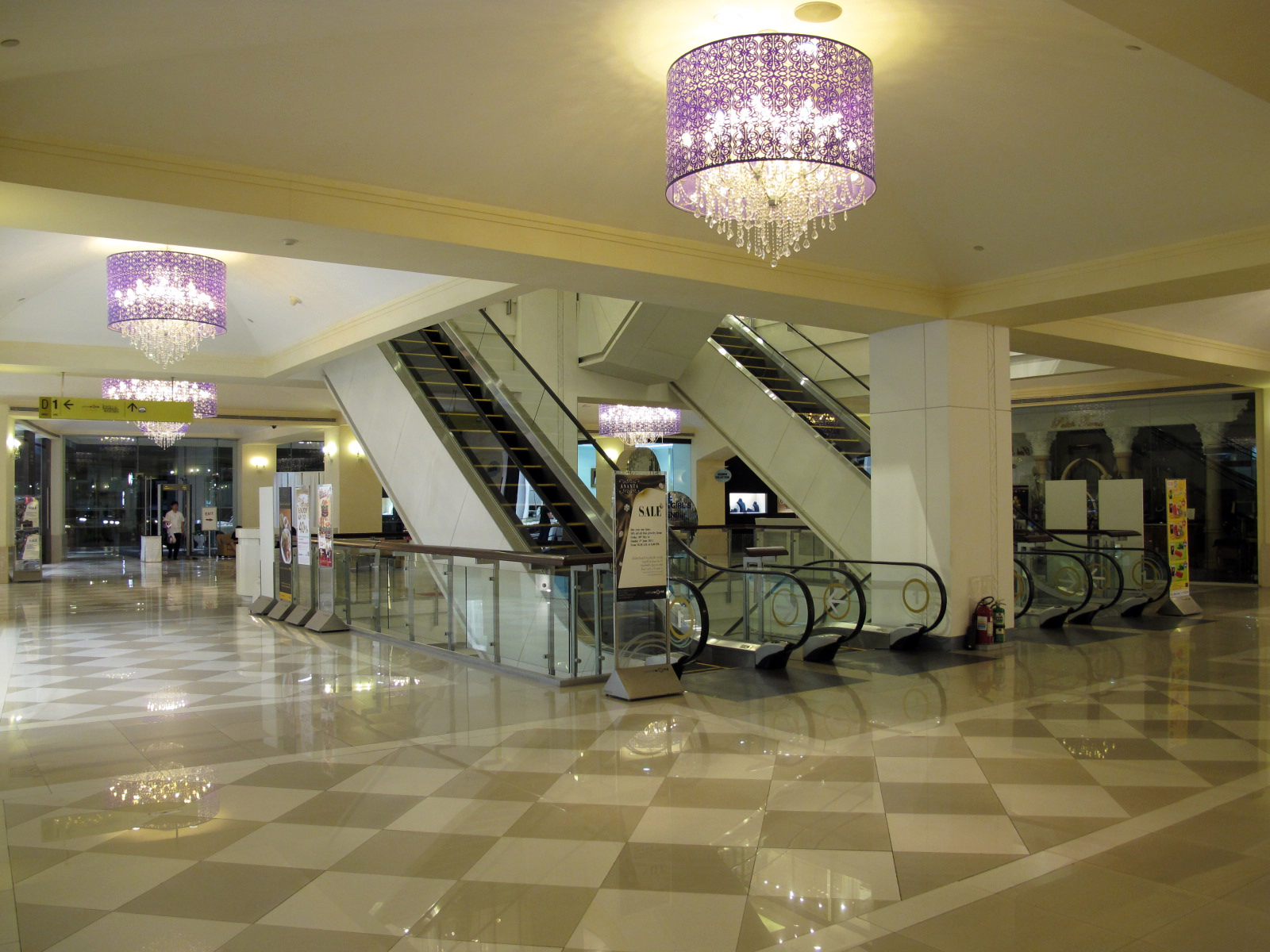
Level 1 jewellery & watches (2011)

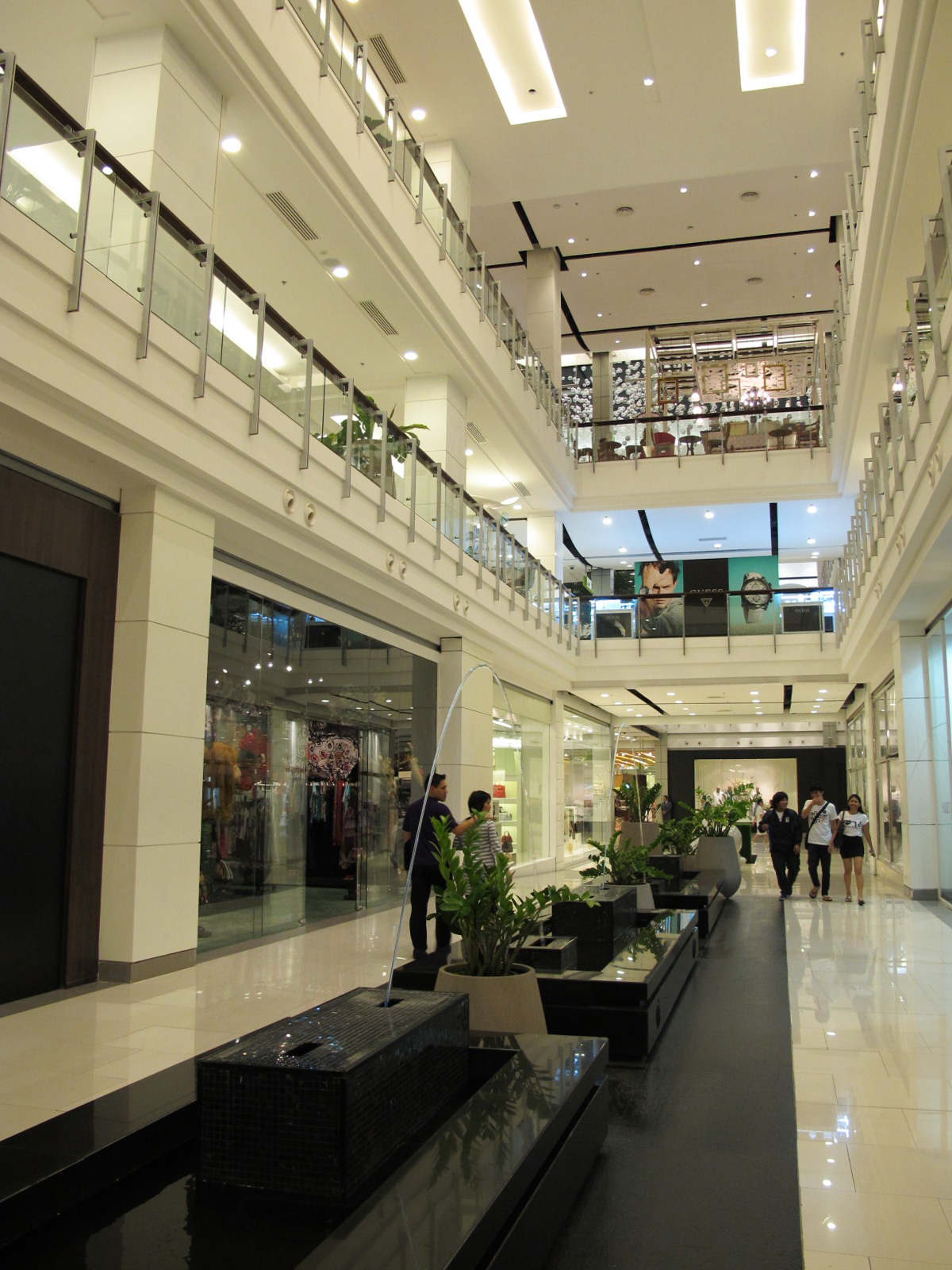
Level 1 Zone E water feature (2011)

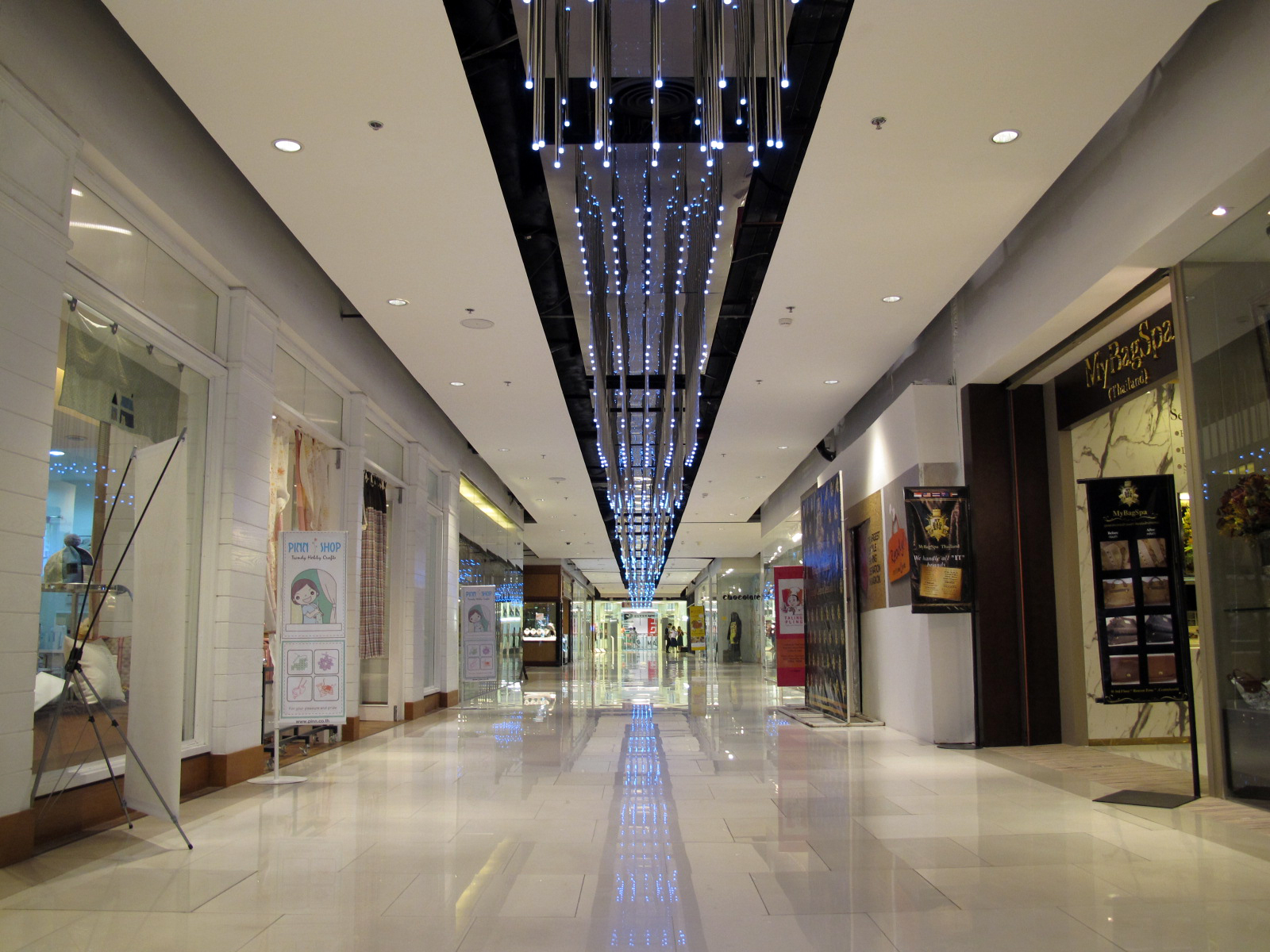
Level 3 (2011)

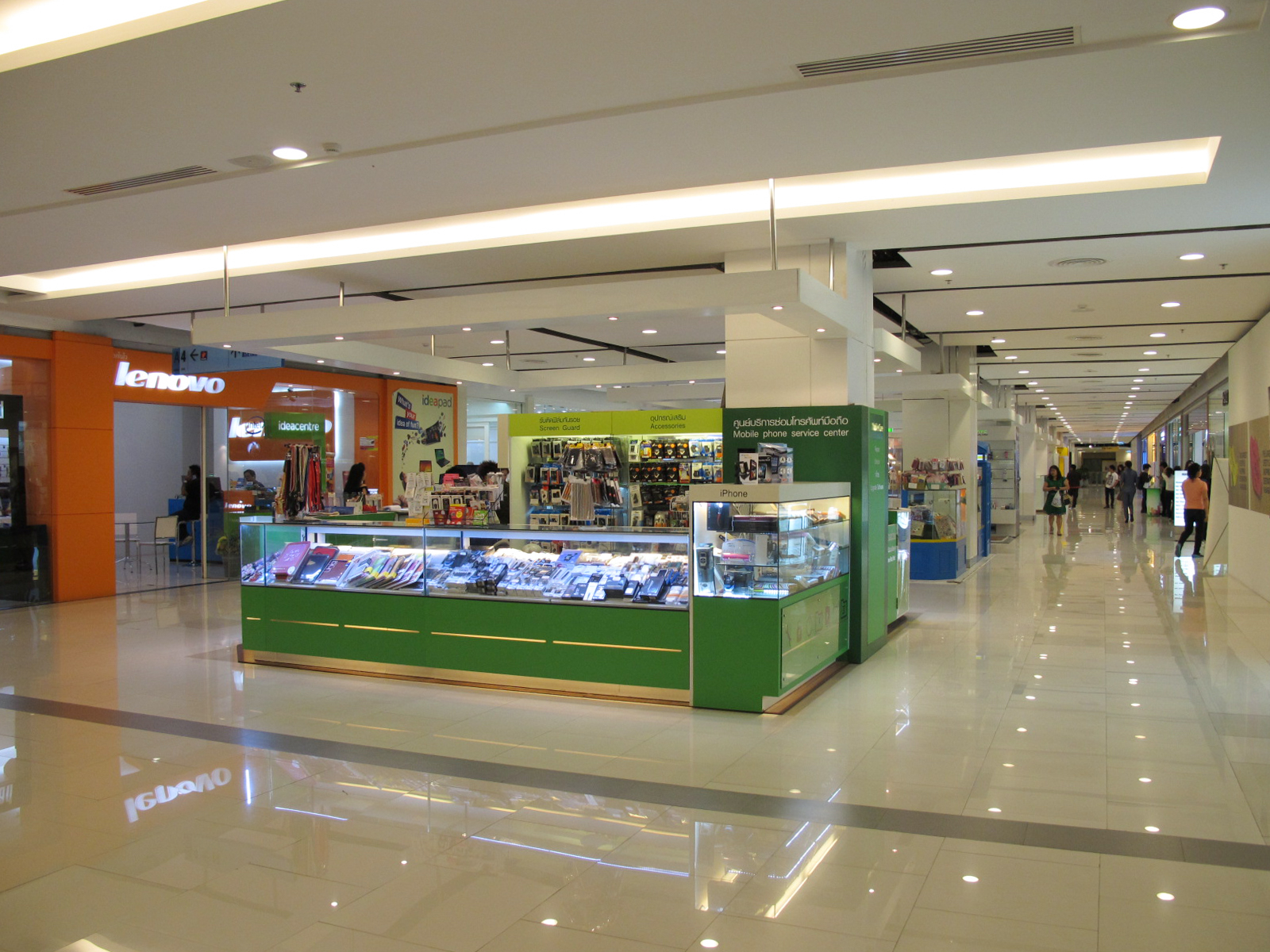
Level 4 Zone B (2011)

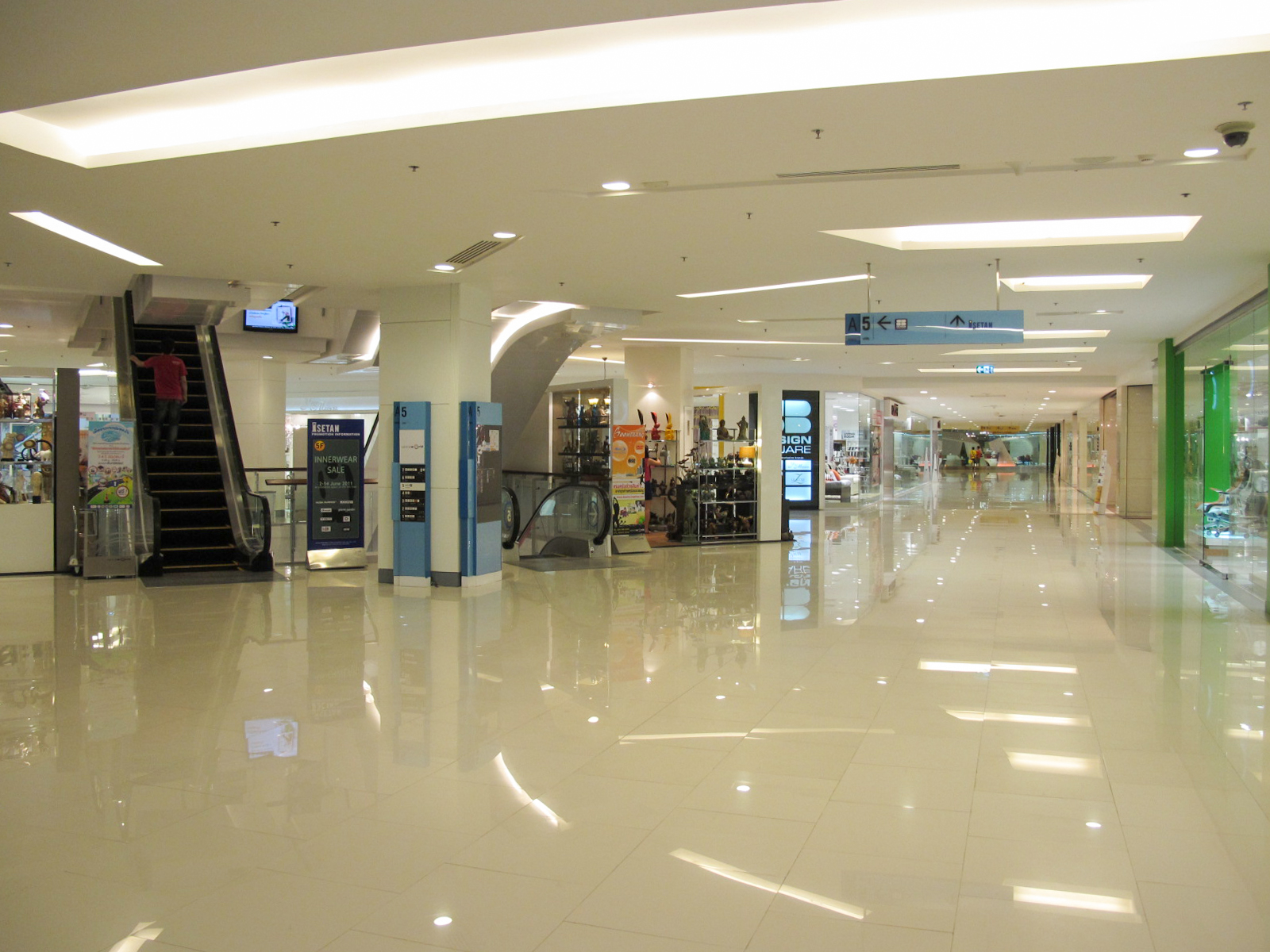
Level 5 Zone A (2011)

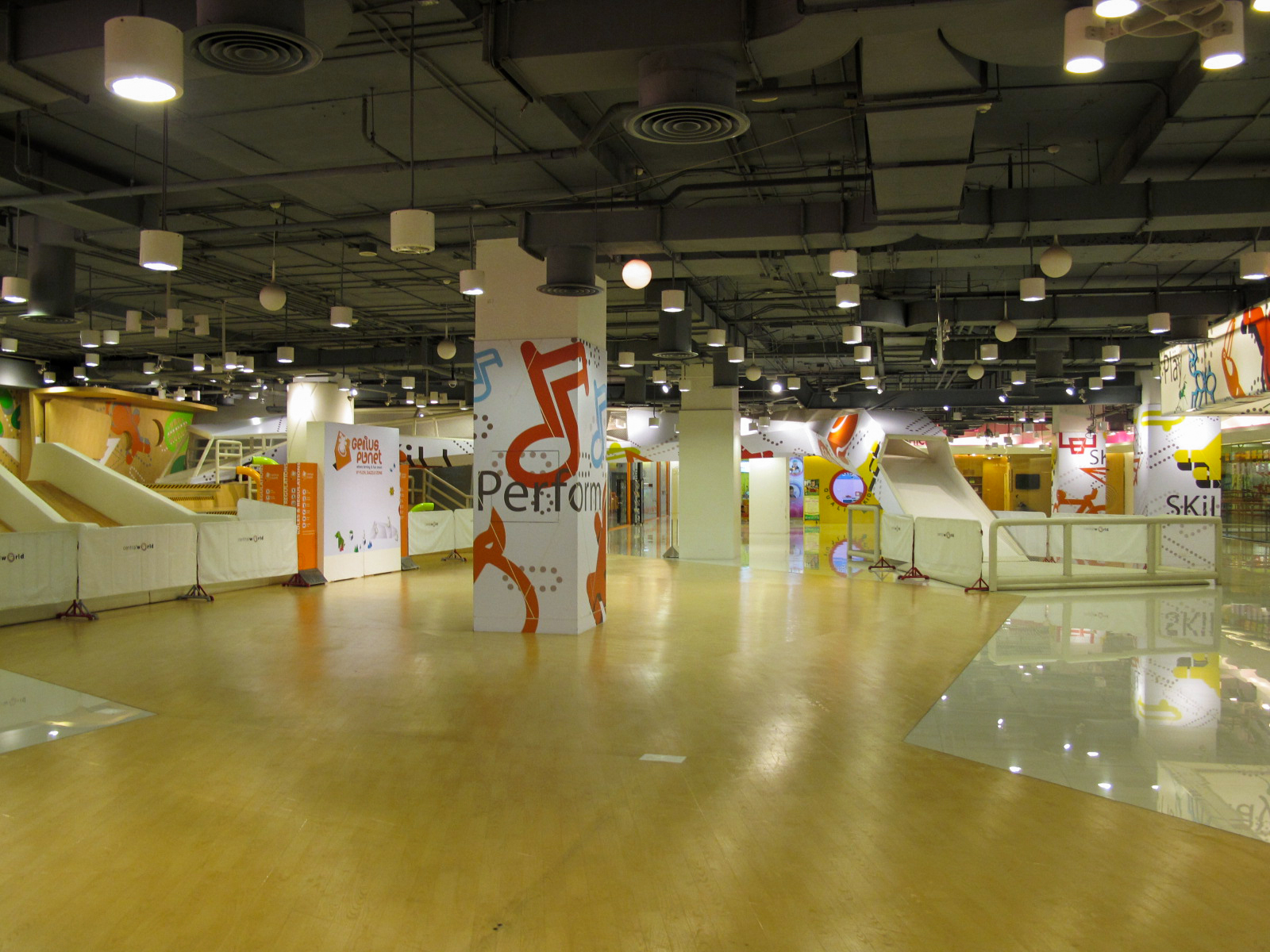
Level 6 Zone C Genius Planet (2011)

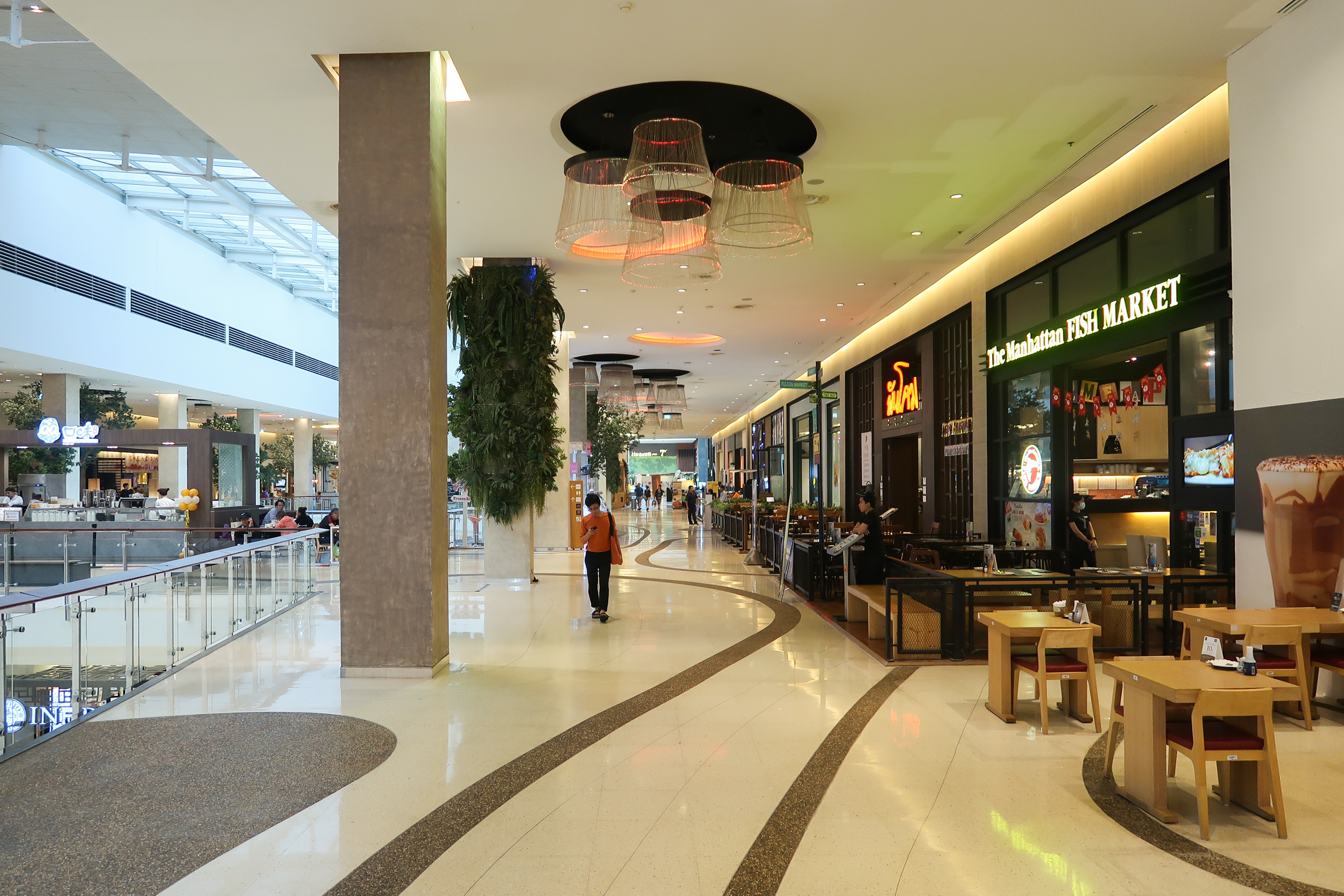
Level 7 Zone A restaurants

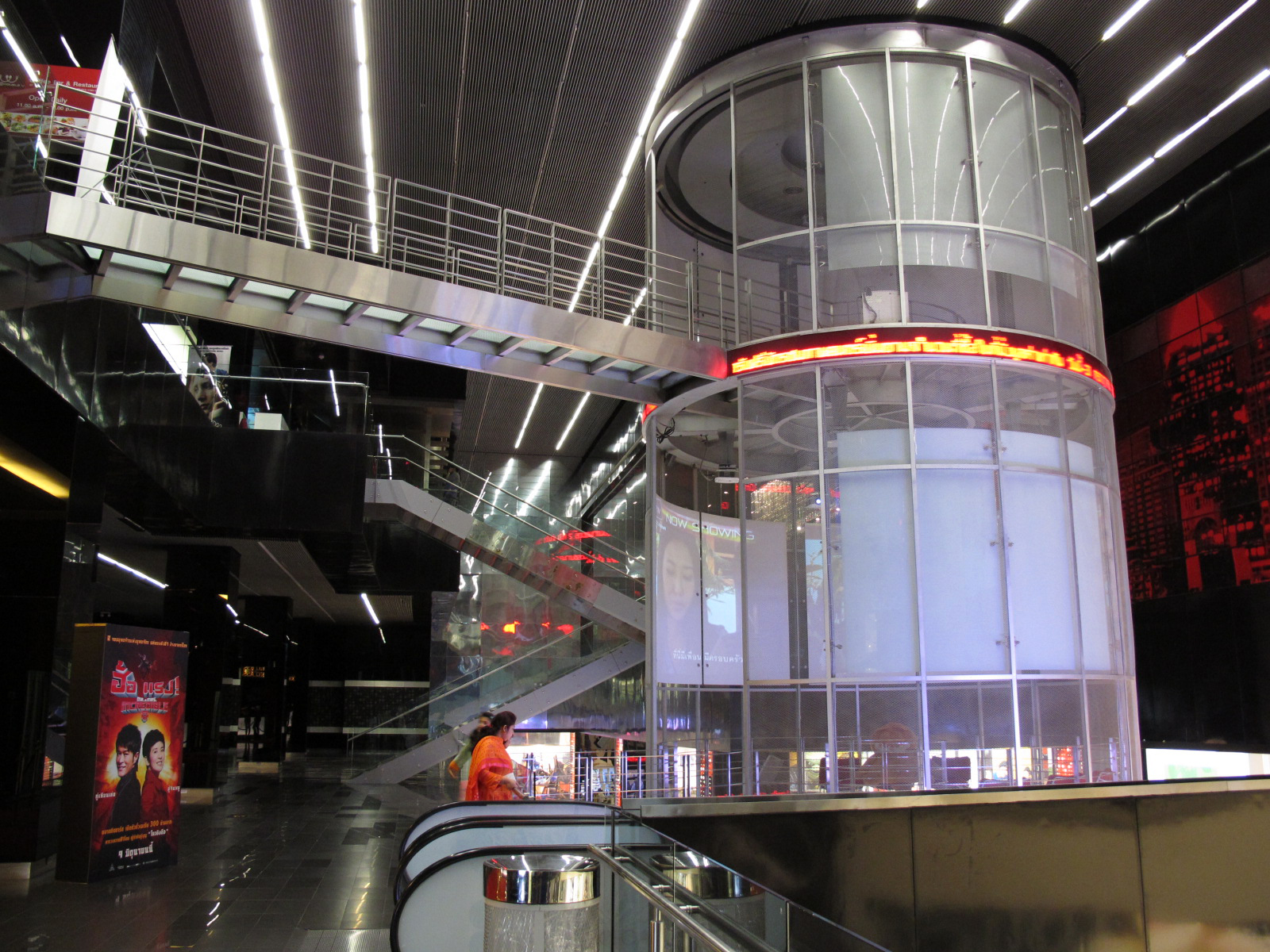
Level 7 SF World Cinema

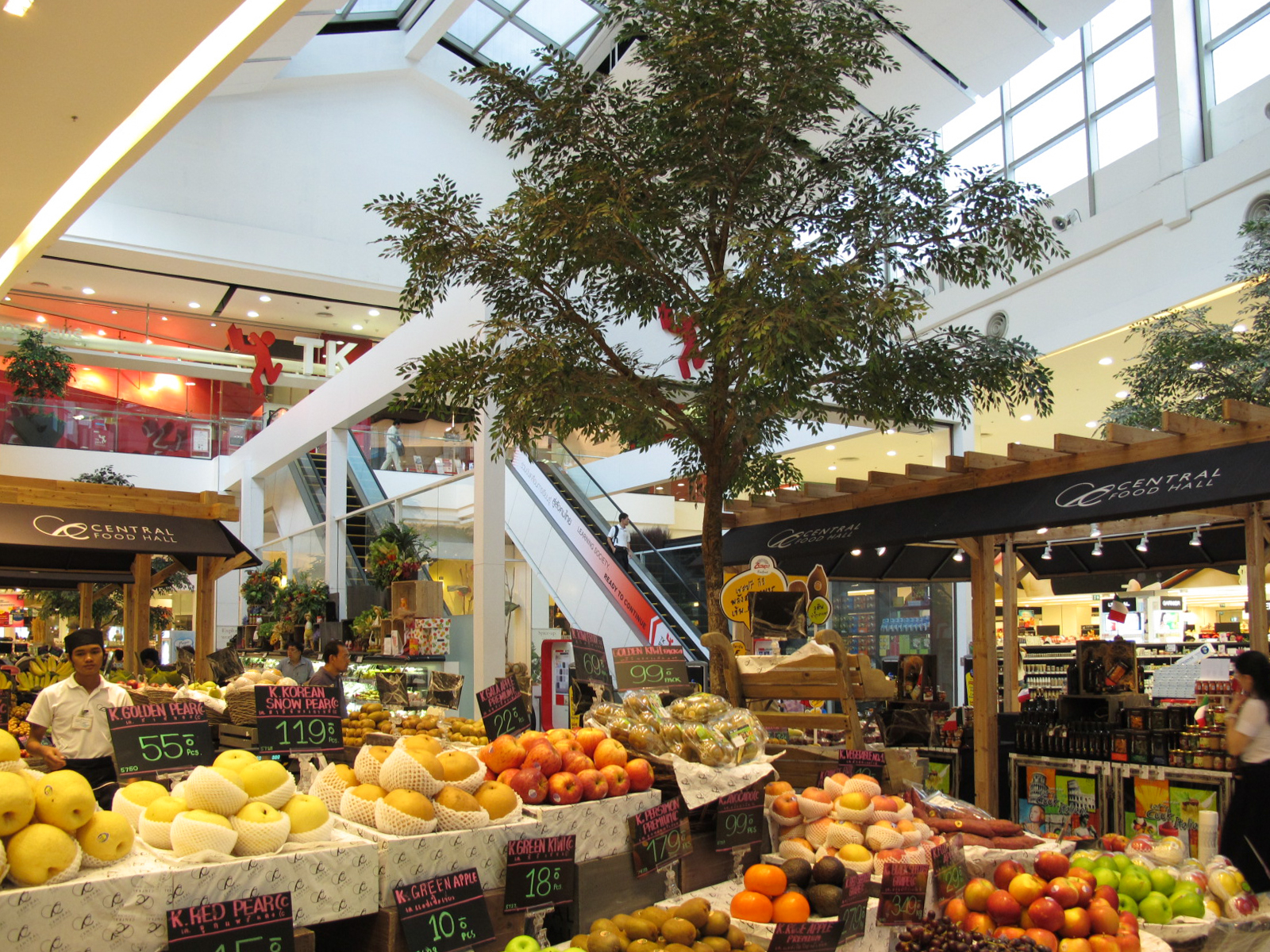
Level 7 Central Food Hall

=== Former tenants ===
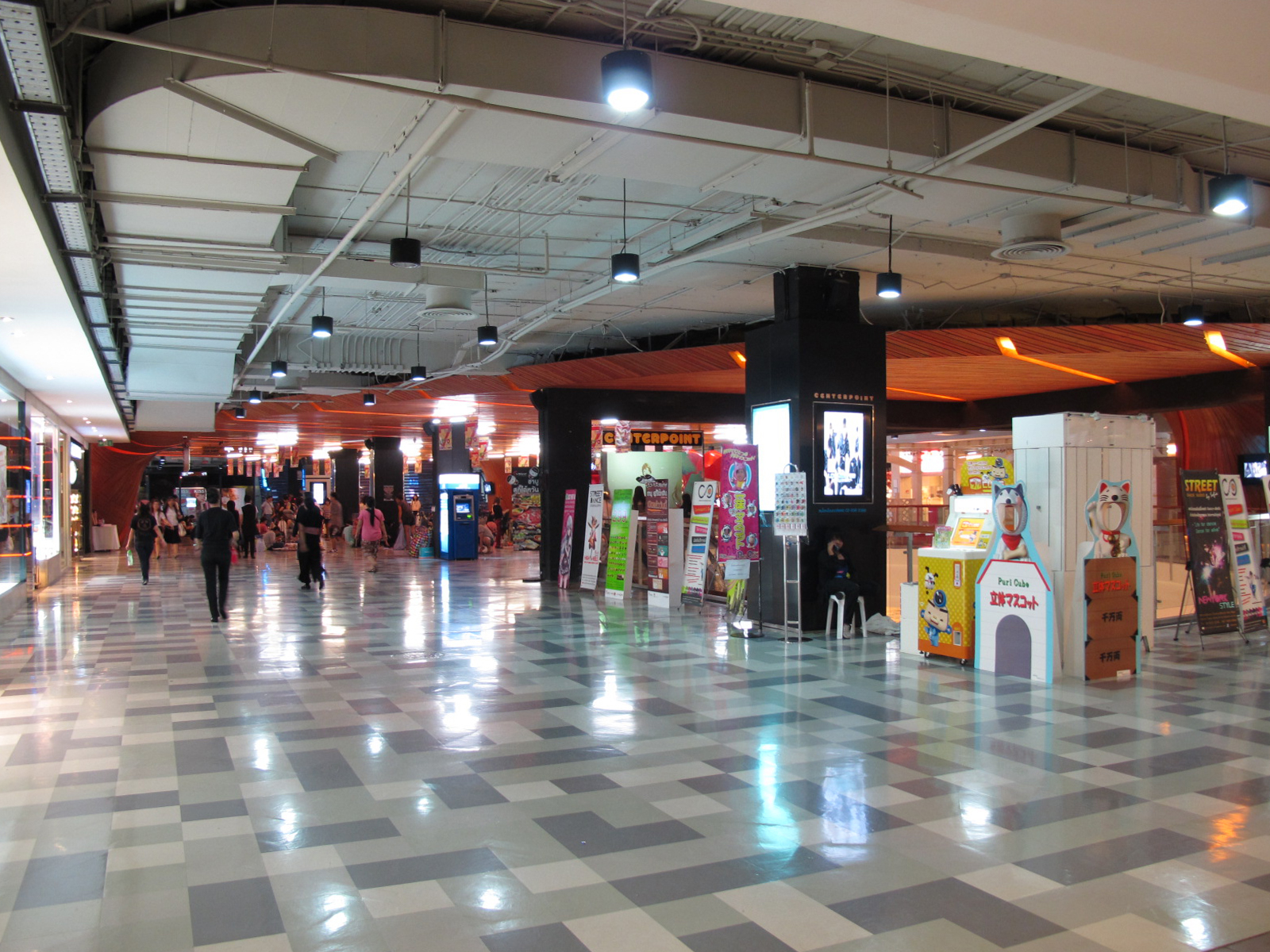
Centerpoint at CentralWorld

- King Power – Thai duty-free store that used to operate on the sixth floor of Zone A. It closed in June 2006 to make way for the expansion of the ZEN department store (now Central Department Store).
- Major Cineplex – former cineplex boasting six screens and 24 bowling lanes. It closed after SF World Cinema opened, in January 2008.
- Centerpoint at CentralWorld – complex of shops, restaurants, game zones, and entertainment venues on level 7. It closed in August 2012 to make way for the Edutainment Zone.
- Isetan – only branch of the Japanese department store chain in Thailand. It has six stories, with items ranging from apparel to domestic goods. It closed in August 2020.

== See also ==
- List of shopping malls in Bangkok
- List of shopping malls in Thailand
- List of largest shopping malls in Thailand
- List of the world's largest shopping malls
