= Washington Square (Bangkok) =

Area in Bangkok, Thailand

Coordinates: 13°43′55″N 100°33′58″E

Washington Square was an entertainment area in Bangkok, Thailand, located for many years at Sukhumvit Soi 22, near the Phrom Phong skytrain station. It contained bars, restaurants, massage parlors and a katoey theatre. Popular mainly with Bangkok expatriates, Middle East oil field workers and older, male, white Americans including many Vietnam War veterans, Bourbon Street was well known for serving Cajun and Creole food and was written up by the Bangkok Post in 2005.

The area features in Christopher G. Moore's series of crime novels about private eye Vincent Calvino, and the Texas Lone Staar bar was often mentioned in the mystery novels of Dean Barrett, who once rented an apartment in the Square.

Washington Square was completely demolished in 2013, pending the construction of a shopping mall and several high rise buildings. The restaurants and a few of the bars have relocated elsewhere on Sukhumvit Road, but most have simply closed. The Mall Group planned to build a shopping mall on the site. A dinosaur theme park was established on the site in 2016. The theme park closed in April 2018 and construction of the mall, now known as EmSphere, was completed in December 2023.

Notable bars in Washington Square included Texas Lone Staar, Silver Dollar, Cheers, The Green Room, Hare & Hound, The Prince of Wales, Happy Pub, Wild Country Bar, Taffy's Hairy Pie Club, Denny's Corner, Flyers, The Dubliner and Easy Pub. The original version of the Sportsman Bar opened in the basement of the old theatre before relocating to Sukhumvit Soi 13.
