= Supaluck Umpujh =

Thai business executive

- ศุภลักษณ์ อัมพุช
- Born: January 20, 1955 (age 71); Bangkok, Thailand
- Education: Mahidol University (BPharm); Purdue University (MPharm)
- Occupation: Businesswoman
- Title: Chairwoman of The Mall Group

Supaluck Umpujh (Thai: ศุภลักษณ์ อัมพุช; born January 20, 1955) is a Thai billionaire real estate developer and chairwoman of The Mall Group, one of Thailand's largest operators of malls and department stores. She is the daughter of Supachai Umpujh, who founded The Mall Group. Supaluck directly oversees the design of The Mall Group properties, including EmSphere.
