= Gourmet market =

Gourmet market may refer to:

- Gourmet market, associated with gourmet food
- Gourmet Market, Thai supermarket chain in The Mall Group
