= List of indoor arenas by capacity =

The following is a list of arenas ordered by seating capacity, which is the maximum number of seated spectators the arena can accommodate for a sports event. Only the capacity for indoor sports, such as basketball, ice hockey, and volleyball, are included. Currently all arenas with a capacity of 15,000 or more are included.

Venues are only included if they are designed primarily for sports traditionally held indoors. Venues built for field sports that also host indoor events are not included. Examples of such unincluded venues are:

- AT&T Stadium (Arlington, Texas, US), a retractable-roof venue built for the Dallas Cowboys (American football).
- Caesars Superdome (New Orleans, Louisiana, US), a domed venue built for the New Orleans Saints (American football).
- Decathlon Arena – Stade Pierre-Mauroy (Lille, France), a retractable-roof venue built for Lille OSC (association football).
- JMA Wireless Dome (Syracuse, New York, US), a domed venue built for multiple sports teams at Syracuse University.
- Paris La Défense Arena (Nanterre, France), a domed venue built for Racing 92 (rugby union).

Some of the above venues have hosted some of the largest crowds in history for indoor sports. The Caesars Superdome, for example, regularly seats more than 70,000 for basketball games (NCAA and NBA). The largest confirmed attendance for a basketball game (108,713) was at AT&T Stadium (then known as Cowboys Stadium) for the 2010 NBA All-Star Game.

By contrast, Saitama Super Arena in the Japanese city of the same name is included because it was built primarily for indoor sports, although it can be configured to host field sports. (Both it and Paris La Défense Arena have movable seating blocks that can adapt to either an arena or field configuration.)

== Current arenas ==
Arena	Capacity	City	Country	Image
KJC King Dome	75,000	Davao City	Philippines	
Philippine Arena	55,000	Bocaue	Philippines	
Mineirinho	25,000	Belo Horizonte	Brazil	
Co-op Live	23,500	Manchester	United Kingdom	
Manchester Arena	23,000	Manchester	United Kingdom	
Saitama Super Arena	22,500	Saitama	Japan	
SKA Arena	22,500	Saint Petersburg	Russia	
Arena Ciudad de México	22,300	Mexico City	Mexico	
Bell Centre	22,114	Montreal	Canada	
KFC Yum! Center	22,090	Louisville, Kentucky	United States	
Greensboro Coliseum	22,000	Greensboro, North Carolina	United States	
Dean Smith Center	21,750	Chapel Hill, North Carolina	United States	
Thompson–Boling Arena	21,678	Knoxville, Tennessee	United States	
United Center	20,917	Chicago	United States	
Amerant Bank Arena	20,737	Sunrise, Florida	United States	
Tacoma Dome	20,722	Tacoma, Washington	United States	
Benchmark International Arena	20,500	Tampa, Florida	United States	
Canadian Tire Centre	20,500	Ottawa	Canada	
Rupp Arena	20,500	Lexington, Kentucky	United States	
Xfinity Mobile Arena	20,478	Philadelphia	United States	
Capital One Arena	20,356	Washington, D.C.	United States	
Little Caesars Arena	20,335	Detroit	United States	
Pyongyang Gymnasium	20,100	Pyongyang	North Korea	
Beach City International Stadium	20,053	Jakarta	Indonesia	
MVM Dome	20,028	Budapest	Hungary	
Roig Arena	20,000	Valencia	Spain	
Arena Guadalajara	20,000	Guadalajara	Mexico	
Arena Potosí	20,000	San Luis Potosí	Mexico	
Coliseo Amauta	20,000	Lima	Peru	
Giti Pasand Arena	20,000	Isfahan	Iran	
Palacio de los Deportes	20,000	Mexico City	Mexico	
Poliedro de Caracas	20,000	Caracas	Venezuela	
The O_{2} Arena	20,000	London	United Kingdom	
Madison Square Garden	19,812	New York City	United States	
Scotiabank Arena	19,800	Toronto	Canada	
Rogers Arena	19,700	Vancouver	Canada	
Kaseya Center	19,600	Miami	United States	
Oakland Arena	19,596	Oakland, California	United States	
Ball Arena	19,520	Denver	United States	
Coliseo de Puerto Rico	19,500	San Juan	Puerto Rico (U.S.)	
Lanxess Arena	19,500	Cologne	Germany	
Lenovo Center	19,500	Raleigh, North Carolina	United States	
Nationwide Arena	19,500	Columbus, Ohio	United States	
Rogers Place	19,500	Edmonton	Canada	
Rocket Arena	19,432	Cleveland	United States	
Bridgestone Arena	19,395	Nashville, Tennessee	United States	
Moda Center	19,393	Portland, Oregon	United States	
Bud Walton Arena	19,368	Fayetteville, Arkansas	United States	
Scotiabank Saddledome	19,289	Calgary	Canada	
American Airlines Center	19,200	Dallas	United States	
KeyBank Center	19,200	Buffalo, New York	United States	
TD Garden	19,156	Boston	United States	
Spectrum Center	19,077	Charlotte, North Carolina	United States	
Crypto.com Arena	19,076	Los Angeles, California	United States	
Value City Arena at the Jerome Schottenstein Center	19,049	Columbus, Ohio	United States	
PPG Paints Arena	19,000	Pittsburgh	United States	
Cadillac Arena	19,000	Beijing	China	
T-Mobile Center	18,972	Kansas City, Missouri	United States	
Freedom Hall	18,865	Louisville, Kentucky	United States	
Kia Center	18,846	Orlando, Florida	United States	
Target Center	18,798	Minneapolis	United States	
Prudential Center	18,711	Newark, New Jersey	United States	
Sportpaleis	23,000	Antwerp	Belgium	
SAP Center at San Jose	18,543	San Jose, California	United States	
Smoothie King Center	18,500	New Orleans	United States	
Frost Bank Center	18,418	San Antonio	United States	
Belgrade Arena	18,386	Belgrade	Serbia	
Gainbridge Fieldhouse	18,345	Indianapolis	United States	
Honda Center	18,336	Anaheim, California	United States	
CHI Health Center Omaha	18,320	Omaha, Nebraska	United States	
Delta Center	18,306	Salt Lake City	United States	
Nikos Galis Olympic Indoor Hall	18,300	Athens	Greece	
Climate Pledge Arena	18,300	Seattle	United States	
Videotron Centre	18,259	Quebec City, Quebec	Canada	
Allstate Arena	18,211	Rosemont, Illinois	United States	
Paycom Center	18,203	Oklahoma City	United States	
FedExForum	18,119	Memphis, Tennessee	United States	
Toyota Center	18,104	Houston	United States	
Enterprise Center	18,096	St. Louis, Missouri	United States	
Chase Center	18,064	San Francisco	United States	
Afterpay Arena	21,000	Sydney	Australia	
T-Mobile Arena	18,000	Paradise, Nevada	United States	
Damai Center	18,000	Dalian	China	
Beijing National Indoor Stadium	18,000	Beijing	China	
Mercedes-Benz Arena	18,000	Shanghai	China	
New Shenzhen Arena	18,000	Shenzhen	China	
Shanghai Oriental Sports Center	18,000	Shanghai	China	
Guangzhou International Sports Arena	18,000	Guangzhou	China	
Simmons Bank Arena	18,000	North Little Rock, Arkansas	United States	
Colonial Life Arena	18,000	Columbia, South Carolina	United States	
Etihad Arena	18,000	Abu Dhabi	United Arab Emirates	
Marriott Center	17,978	Provo, Utah	United States	
Palau Sant Jordi	17,960	Barcelona	Spain	
Grand Casino Arena	17,954	Saint Paul, Minnesota	United States	
Xfinity Center	17,950	College Park, Maryland	United States	
Intuit Dome	17,927	Inglewood, California	United States	
Thomas & Mack Center	17,923	Paradise, Nevada	United States	
BOK Center	17,839	Tulsa, Oklahoma	United States	
Barclays Center	17,732	Brooklyn, New York	United States	
Legacy Arena	17,654	Birmingham, Alabama	United States	
Golden 1 Center	17,608	Sacramento, California	United States	
Arena Monterrey	17,599	Monterrey	Mexico	
Kia Forum	17,500	Inglewood, California	United States	
Movistar Arena	17,453	Madrid	Spain	
Fiserv Forum	17,385	Milwaukee	United States	
FirstOntario Centre	17,383	Hamilton, Ontario	Canada	
O_{2} Arena	17,383	Prague	Czech Republic	
Capital Indoor Stadium	17,345	Beijing	China	
Kohl Center	17,287	Madison, Wisconsin	United States	
Simon Skjodt Assembly Hall	17,222	Bloomington, Indiana	United States	
MGM Grand Garden Arena	17,157	Paradise, Nevada	United States	
Desert Diamond Arena	17,125	Glendale, Arizona	United States	
Footprint Center	17,071	Phoenix, Arizona	United States	
Heritage Bank Center	17,000	Cincinnati	United States	
Salle Omnisport de Radès	17,000	Radès	Tunisia	
Ziggo Dome	17,000	Amsterdam	Netherlands	
Coca-Cola Arena	17,000	Dubai	United Arab Emirates	
Cairo Stadium Indoor Halls Complex (Main Hall)	16,900	Cairo, Egypt	Egypt	
State Farm Arena	16,600	Atlanta	United States	
Pala Alpitour	16,600	Turin	Italy	
Frank C. Erwin Jr. Center	16,540	Austin, Texas	United States	
Indonesia Arena	16,500	Jakarta	Indonesia	
Arena México	16,500	Mexico City	Mexico	
Arena Zagreb	16,500	Zagreb, Croatia	Croatia	
Rotterdam Ahoy	16,500	Rotterdam	Netherlands	
Sinan Erdem Dome	16,457	Istanbul	Turkey	
Pacific Coliseum	16,281	Vancouver	Canada	
Casey's Center	16,110	Des Moines, Iowa	United States	
Axiata Arena	16,000	Kuala Lumpur	Malaysia	
Coliseo General Rumiñahui	16,000	Quito	Ecuador	
Osaka-jo Hall	16,000	Osaka	Japan	
SM Arena Seaside Cebu	16,000	Cebu City	Philippines	
Arena Birmingham	15,800	Birmingham	United Kingdom	
Fernando Buesa Arena	15,716	Vitoria-Gasteiz	Spain	
Resorts World Arena	15,685	Birmingham	United Kingdom	
Accor Arena	15,609	Paris	France	
Roig Arena	15,600	Valencia	Spain	
Save Mart Center at Fresno State	15,596	Fresno, California	United States	
PeoplesBank Arena	15,564	Hartford, Connecticut	United States	
State Farm Center	15,544	Champaign, Illinois	United States	
Pinnacle Bank Arena	15,500	Lincoln, Nebraska	United States	
Perth Arena	15,500	Perth	Australia	
Olympiahalle	15,500	Munich	Germany	
Aspire Dome	15,500	Doha	Qatar	
Farmasi Arena	15,430	Rio de Janeiro	Brazil	
Žalgiris Arena	15,415	Kaunas	Lithuania	
Bizkaia Arena	15,414	Barakaldo	Spain	
The Pit	15,411	Albuquerque, New Mexico	United States	
Rod Laver Arena	15,400	Melbourne	Australia	
Coleman Coliseum	15,383	Tuscaloosa, Alabama	United States	
Westfalenhalle	15,380	Dortmund	Germany	
Arena Sofia	15,373	Sofia	Bulgaria	
Canada Life Centre	15,321	Winnipeg	Canada	
Allen Fieldhouse	15,300	Lawrence, Kansas	United States	
Lusail Sports Arena	15,300	Lusail	Qatar	
Bryce Jordan Center	15,261	University Park, Pennsylvania	United States	
MVP Arena	15,229	Albany, New York	United States	
SaskTel Centre	15,100	Saskatoon	Canada	
United Supermarkets Arena	15,098	Lubbock, Texas	United States	
Minsk-Arena	15,086	Minsk	Belarus	
Taipei Arena	15,085	Taipei	Taiwan	
Mizzou Arena	15,061	Columbia, Missouri	United States	
Tauron Arena Kraków	15,030	Kraków	Poland	
Intrust Bank Arena	15,004	Wichita, Kansas	United States	
ING Arena	15,000	Brussels	Belgium	
Olympic Gymnastics Arena	15,000	Seoul	South Korea	
SM Arena Mall of Asia	15,000	Pasay	Philippines	
Jon M. Huntsman Center	15,000	Salt Lake City	United States	
Marine Messe Fukuoka	15,000	Fukuoka	Japan	
Arena Jaraguá	15,000	Jaraguá do Sul	Brazil	
Ginásio de Esportes Geraldo Magalhães	15,000	Recife	Brazil	
Cotai Arena	15,000	Macau	Macau	
Coliseo de la Ciudad Deportiva	15,000	Havana	Cuba	
Helliniko Olympic Arena	15,000	Elliniko	Greece	
Taoyuan Arena	15,000	Taoyuan	Taiwan	
Kaohsiung Arena	15,000	Kaohsiung	Taiwan	
Hamdan Sports Complex	15,000	Dubai	United Arab Emirates	
VFG Arena	15,000	Guadalajara	Mexico	
Movistar Arena	15,000	Buenos Aires	Argentina	
Romexpo Dome	15,000	Bucharest	Romania	
Dakar Arena	15,000	Dakar	Senegal	
Meo Arena	15,000	Lisbon	Portugal	

== Arenas under construction ==
Arena	Capacity	City	Country	Opening
Taichung Dome	30,000- 50,000	Taichung	Taiwan	2030
DD Arena	22,296	Pardubice	Czechia	2027
Arena Polivalentă	20,000	Bucharest	Romania	Unknown
Madrid Arena	20,000	Madrid	Spain	2030
Bangkok Arena (Bang Na)	15,000	Bangkok	Thailand	2026

== See also ==
- List of indoor arenas
- List of stadiums by capacity
