= EmQuartier =

Shopping mall in Bangkok, Thailand

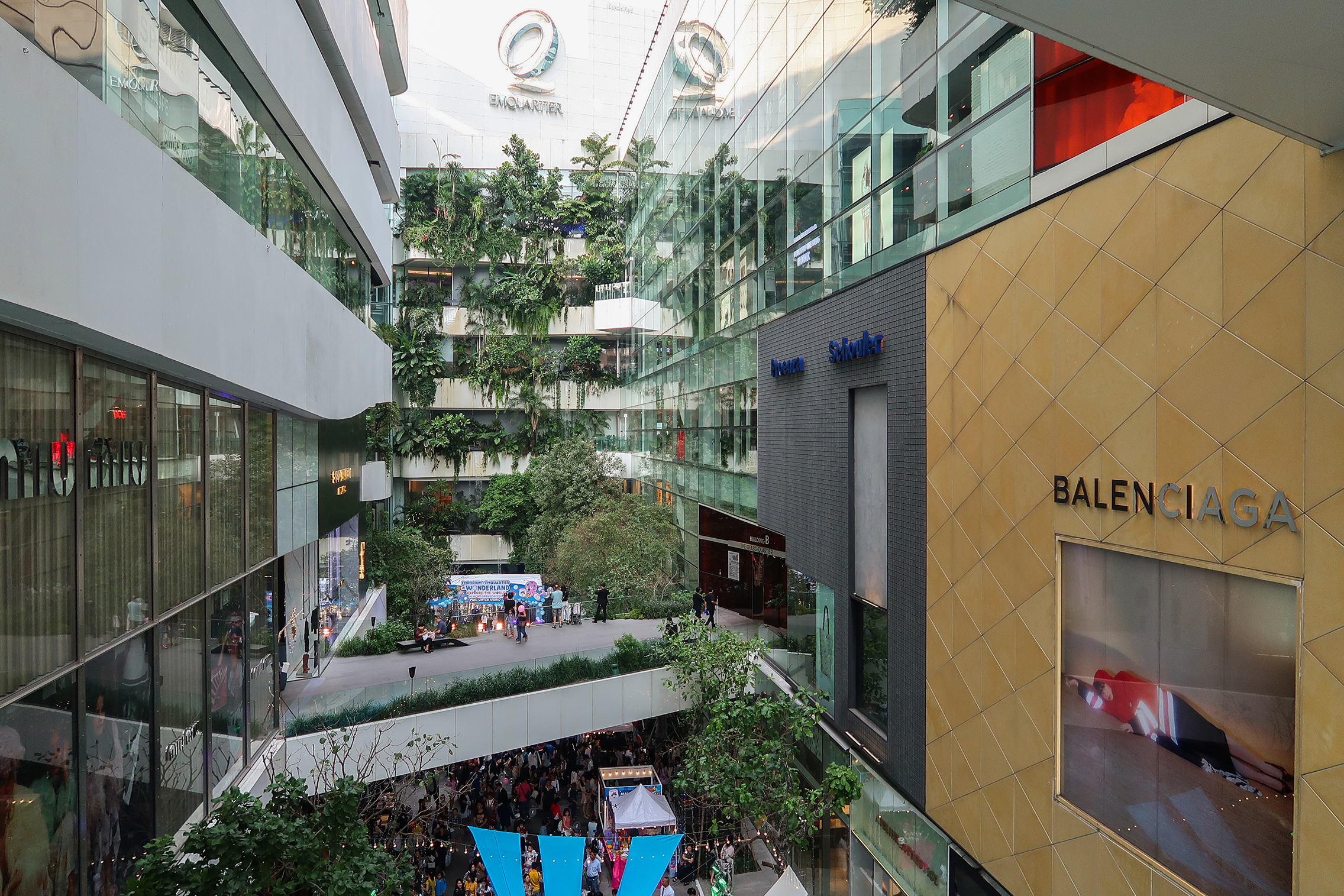
- EmQuartier in 2018

- Location within Thailand

General information
- Status: Completed
- Type: Mixed use
- Location: Bangkok, Thailand, 689, 693 and 695 Sukhumvit Road, Watthana, Bangkok, Thailand
- Coordinates: 13.7315°N 100.5692°E
- Opened: May 2015
- Cost: $800 million
- Client: The Mall Group - Bhiraj Buri

Technical details
- Floor area: 2,700,000 sq ft (250,000 m^{2})

Design and construction
- Architects: Thomas Leeser - BOIFFILS Architecture - [au]workshop - DBALP - D103; Interior Design = BOIFFILS Architectures

Other information
- Parking: underground automated parking and parking tower

Website
- www.emquartier.co.th

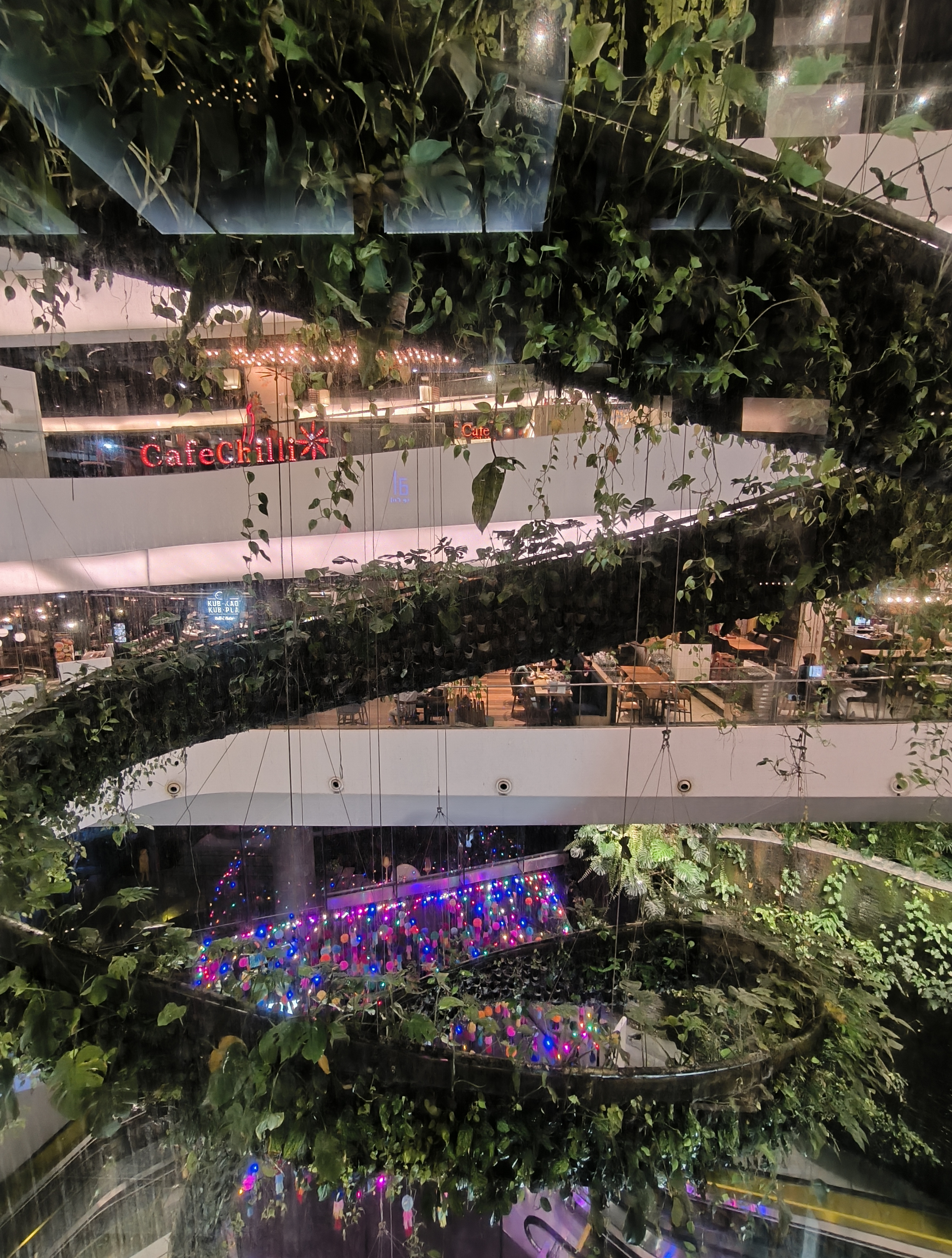
Emquartier Water Garden

The EmQuartier is a large shopping mall in Bangkok, Thailand opened in May 2015. The mall is connected to Phrom Phong BTS Station on the Sukhumvit Line of the BTS Skytrain.

It is one of three malls in the “EM District”, along with Emporium and EmSphere. All three buildings total an area of 2,500,000 square feet of mixed-use retail space and are located on a 50-rai plot of land adjacent to Benchasiri Park. The mall is operated by The Mall Group.

Designed by the architecture firm Leeser Architecture, the building features a 30-ft open-air garden on the fifth floor, six stories of dining terraces sitting atop a helical floor slab, an eight-theater cinema complex including an IMAX theater as well as a pedestrian street and five-story waterfall, as well as two stories of underground parking. The mall is divided into three sections, named the Helix Quartier, the Waterfall Quartier and the Glass Quartier. The mall won a Prix Versailles 2018 Special Prize in Shopping Center Category of South Asia and Pacific.
