= Emporium (Bangkok) =

Shopping mall in Thailand

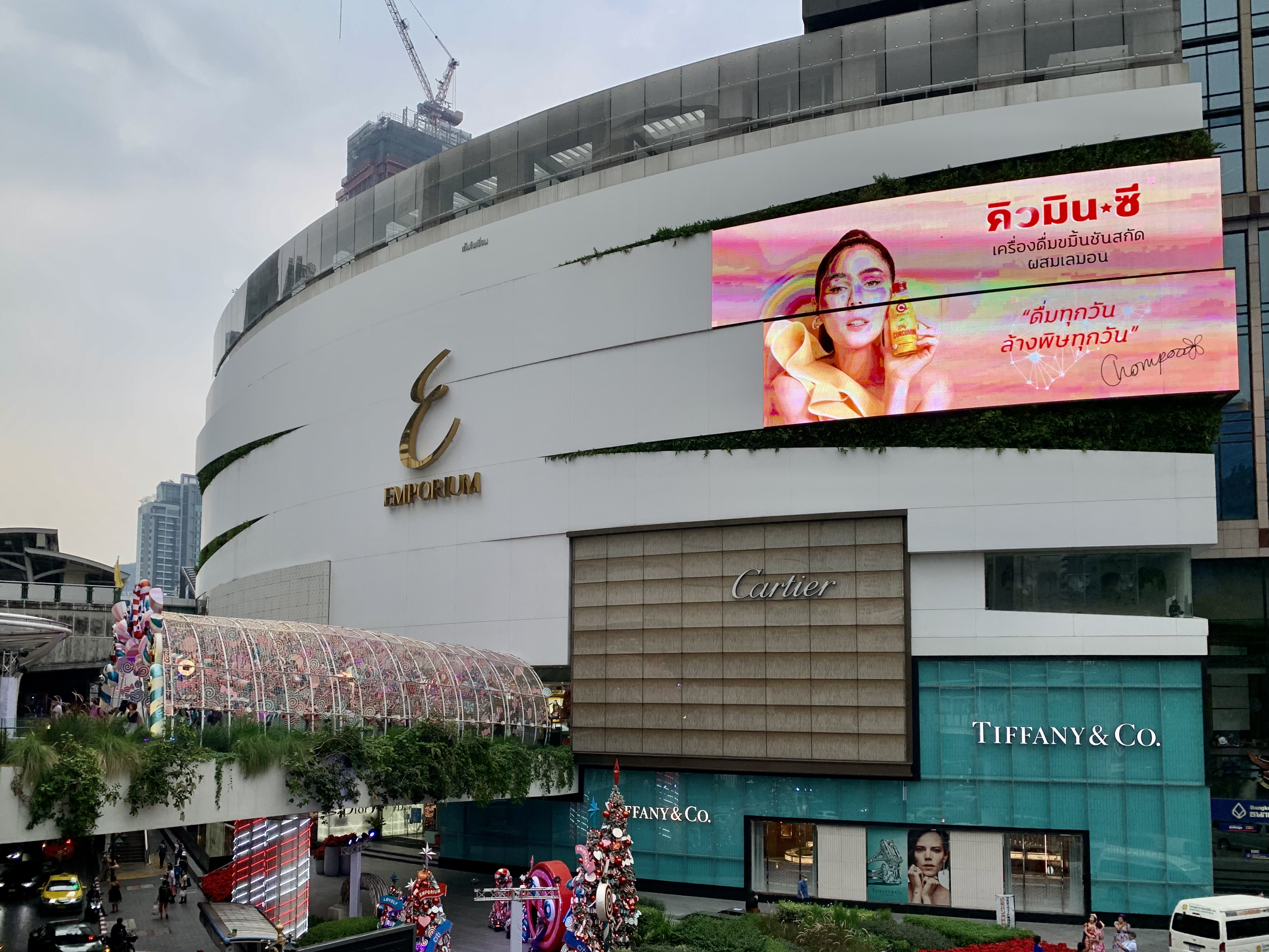
- Emporium in 2020
- Location: Khlong Toei, Bangkok, Thailand
- Coordinates: 13.7307°N 100.5689°E
- Address: 622 Sukhumvit Soi 24
- Opened: 27 July 1997
- Developer: The Mall Group
- Manager: The Mall Group
- Owner: The Mall Group
- Num. of anchor tenants: 7
- Floors: 7 and 1 basement
- Website: theemdistrict.com

Emporium is a luxury shopping mall in Khlong Toei District, Bangkok, Thailand. It opened on 27 July 1997. It is owned and operated by The Mall Group, who also operate the EmQuartier and Siam Paragon malls in Bangkok.

It is on Sukhumvit Road at Sukhumvit Soi 24 beside Benchasiri Park. It is connected directly to the Phrom Phong Station on the Sukhumvit Line of the BTS Skytrain by a footbridge.

Emporium is a major component of the "EM District" and contains a shopping mall, department store, a luxury cinema "Emprivé Cineclub by SF Corporation", a high-end supermarket, food court, office building, exhibition hall, children's play centres and a hotel. Emporium is a popular hub for entertainment, food, and education for local residents and visitors.

== Design ==
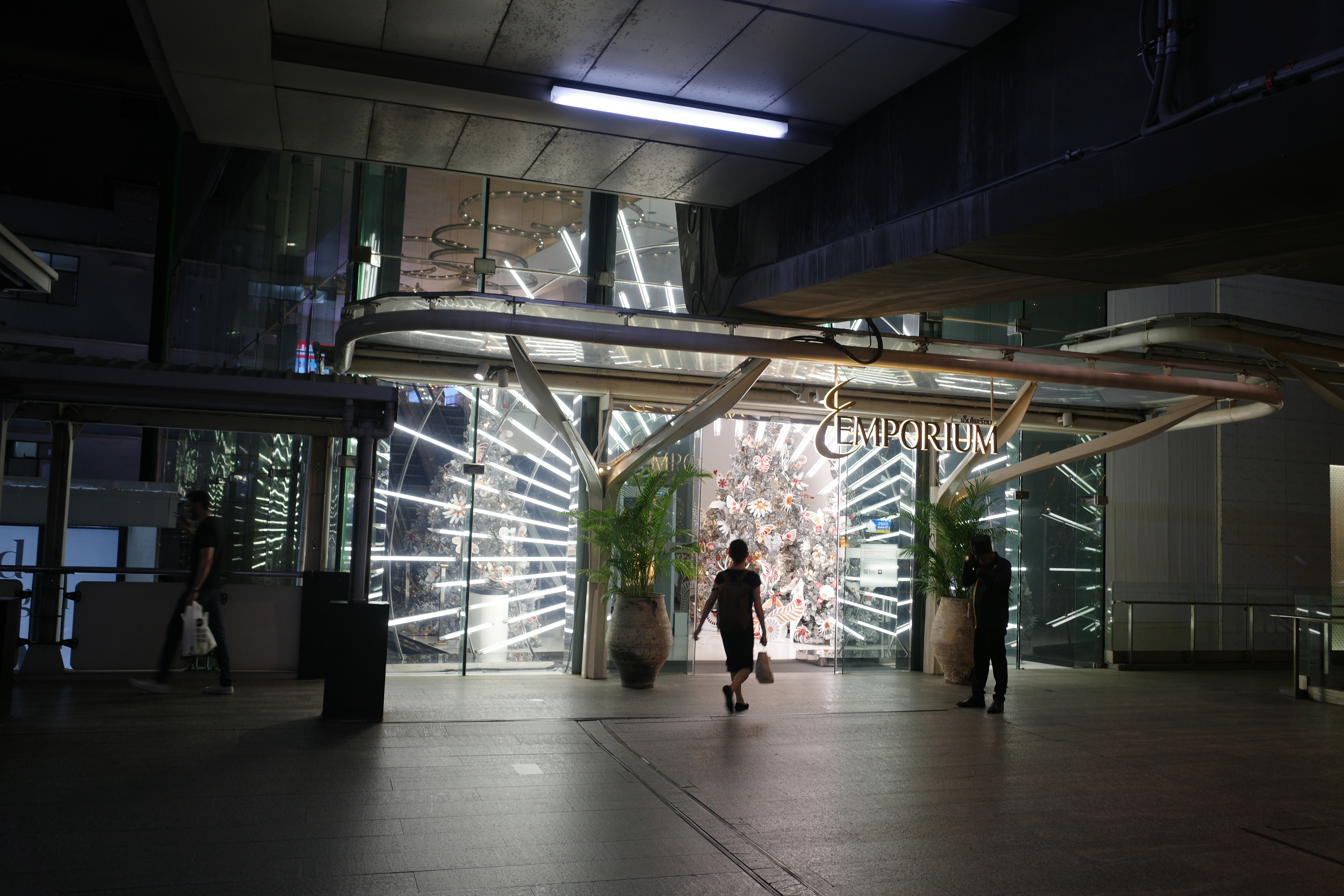
Entrance to Emporium from the BTS Phrom Phong elevated skywalk

Emporium was designed by J+H Boiffils. Emporium was their first shopping mall design project in Thailand. They later designed Siam Paragon, another Bangkok shopping mall, for the same developer. Emporium was Bangkok's first luxury lifestyle mall offering venues for upscale shopping, dining, entertainment, and supermarket in one complex. With the launch of the Bangkok Skytrain system several years later, Emporium was the first mall to allow direct access from the Skytrain station.

== Space allocation ==
Currently, the building has two functional parts.

- Shopping complex – This part of the mall is decorated in the form of a gallery with white and gold. It consists of:
  - The Emporium department store
  - Gourmet Market (supermarket) and Food Hall
  - Emprivé Cineclub by SF Corporation
  - Roller Dome
  - AIS D.C. by TCDC and AIS
- Emporium Tower – A multi-purpose building 41 floors high. It consists of two parts:
  - Emporium office building
  - Emporium Suites serviced apartments

== EM District expansion ==
In 2013, The Mall Group announced six new projects, including the re-announcing of the Emporium Quartier and the Emporium Sphere, and called them as The EM District. The EM District is a group of three Emporium's shopping malls:

- Emporium – The first shopping mall, opened in 1997
- EmQuartier – The second shopping mall, opposite Emporium. Opened in May 2015.
- EmSphere - The third branch of the District EM shopping mall group next to Benchasiri Park. The project was expected to be constructed from in 2015-7 but construction was delayed. Between 2016 and 2018, the land earmarked for Emsphere was occupied by a temporary dinosaur theme park called Dinosaur Planet. It opened in December 2023.
