= Bangkok Arena (Bangkok Mall) =

SPORT ARENA IN BANGKOK MALL COMPLEX

Bangkok Arena แบงค็อก อารีน่า
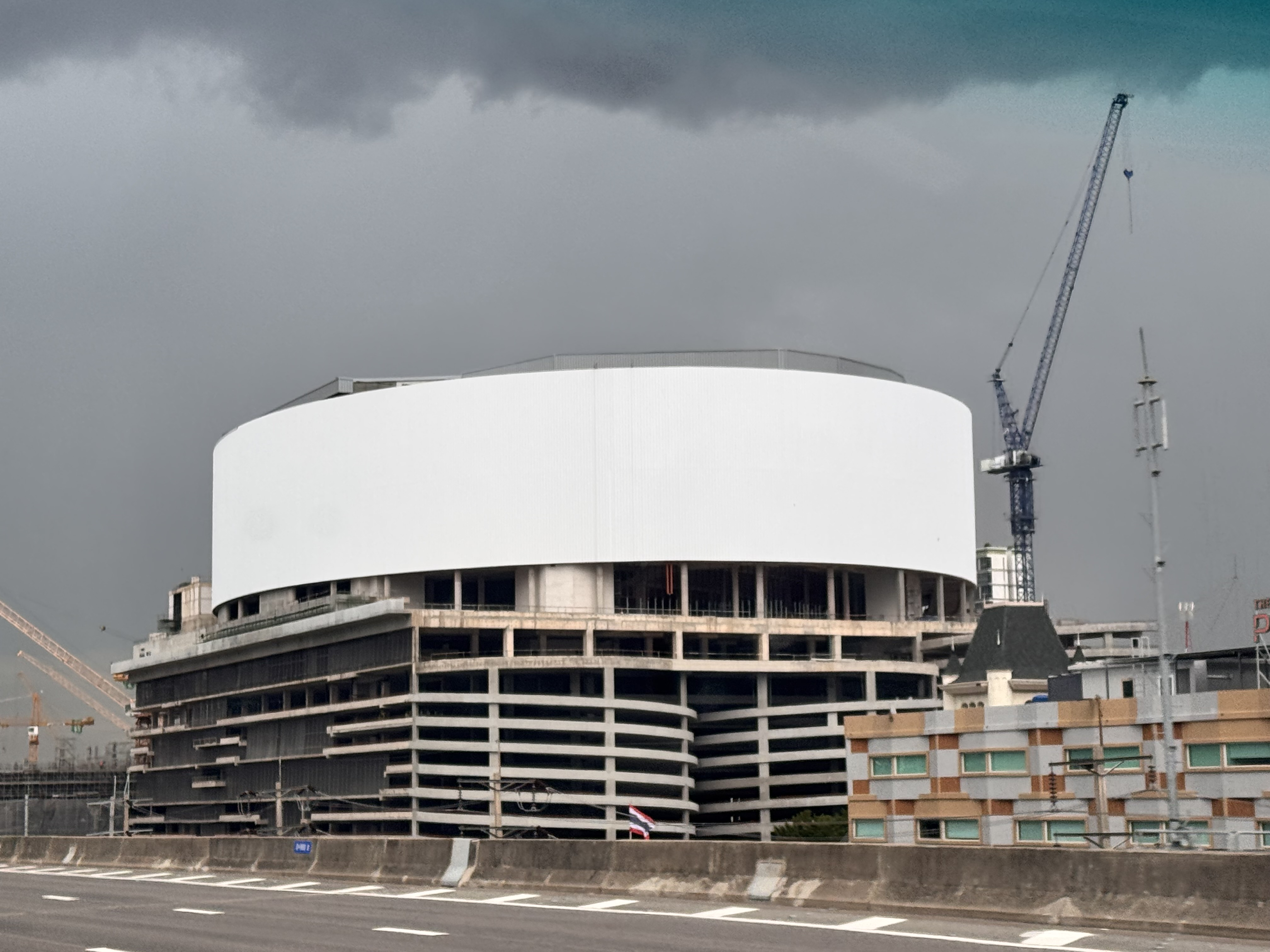
- Under construction in August 2026
- Interactive map of Bangkok Arena แบงค็อก อารีน่า
- Location: Bang Na, Bangkok, Thailand
- Coordinates: 13.67352°N 100.61273°E
- Owner: The Mall Group
- Operator: Anschutz Entertainment Group
- Capacity: 18,000
- Public transit: BTS Udom Suk; BTS Bang Na

Construction
- Groundbreaking: 2018; 8 years ago
- Opened: 2028; 2 years' time

Bangkok Arena (Thai: แบงค็อก อารีน่า) is a multi-purpose indoor arena currently under construction in the Bang Na district of Bangkok, Thailand. It is located within the Bangkok Mall complex, a mixed-use development project valued at approximately 50 billion baht. Once opened, it is expected to be the largest indoor arena in Thailand, with a seating capacity of approximately 18,000.

The arena was said to open in the first quarter of 2023, but will now open in 2028 per AEG, after the Bangkok Mall opens in early 2026. It is owned by The Mall Group and operated by the Anschutz Entertainment Group.

== See also ==
- Em Live
