= Museum of the Moving Image =

Museum and archive in Queens, New York

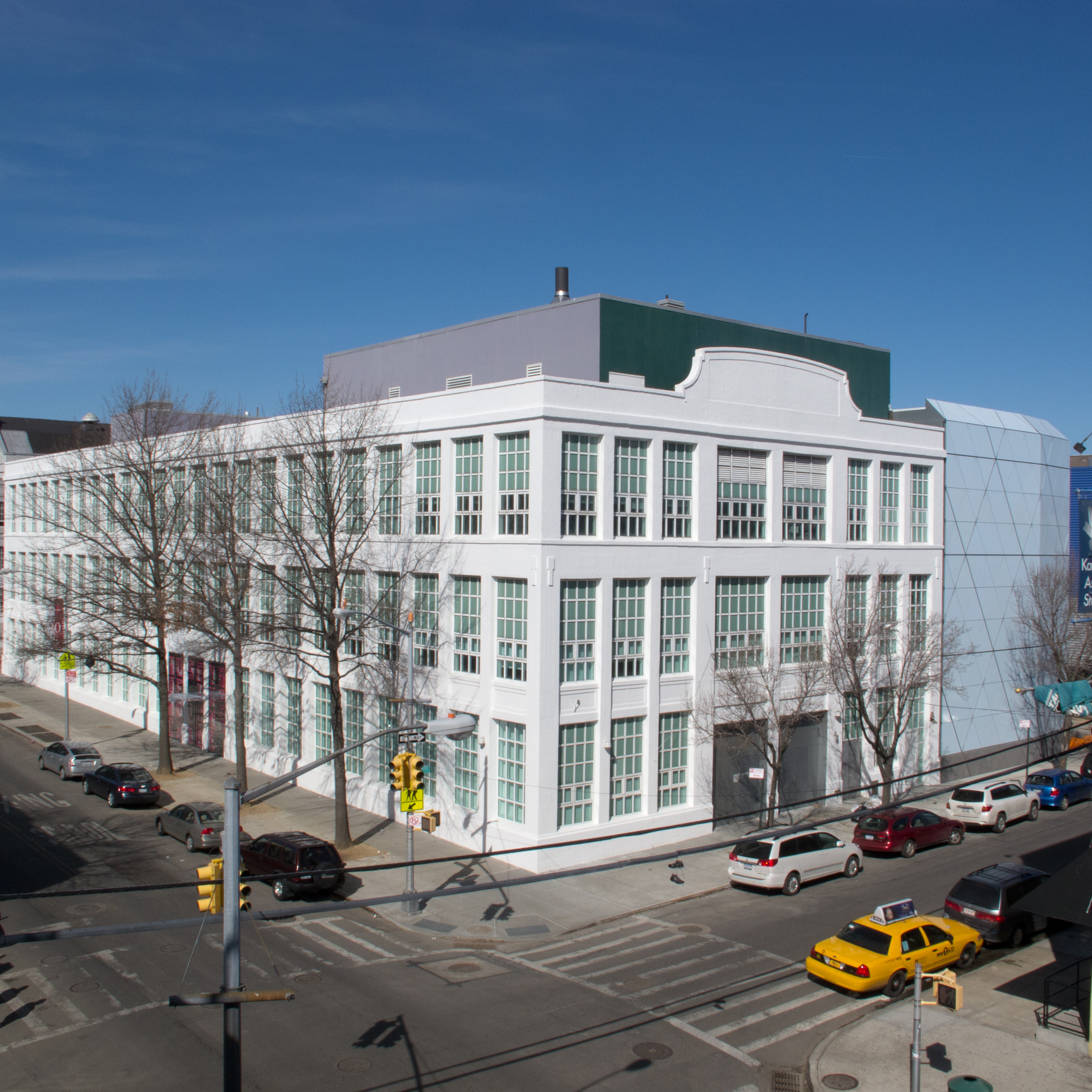
- Museum of the Moving Image exterior in 2011

- Location of the Museum of the Moving Image in New York City
- Established: September 10, 1988
- Location: 35th Avenue and 36th Street, Astoria, Queens, New York City
- Coordinates: 40.756211°N 73.923964°W
- Public transit access: New York City Subway: 36th Avenue; MTA Bus: Q66, Q101
- Website: movingimage.org

The Museum of the Moving Image (MoMI) is a time-based media museum located in a former building of the historic Astoria Studios (now Kaufman Astoria Studios), in the Astoria neighborhood of Queens in New York City. The museum originally opened in 1988 as the American Museum of the Moving Image, and in 1996, opened its permanent exhibition, "Behind the Screen", designed by Ali Höcek of AC Höcek Architecture LLC. The museum began a $67 million expansion in March 2008 and reopened in January 2011. The expansion was designed by architect Thomas Leeser.

== Description ==
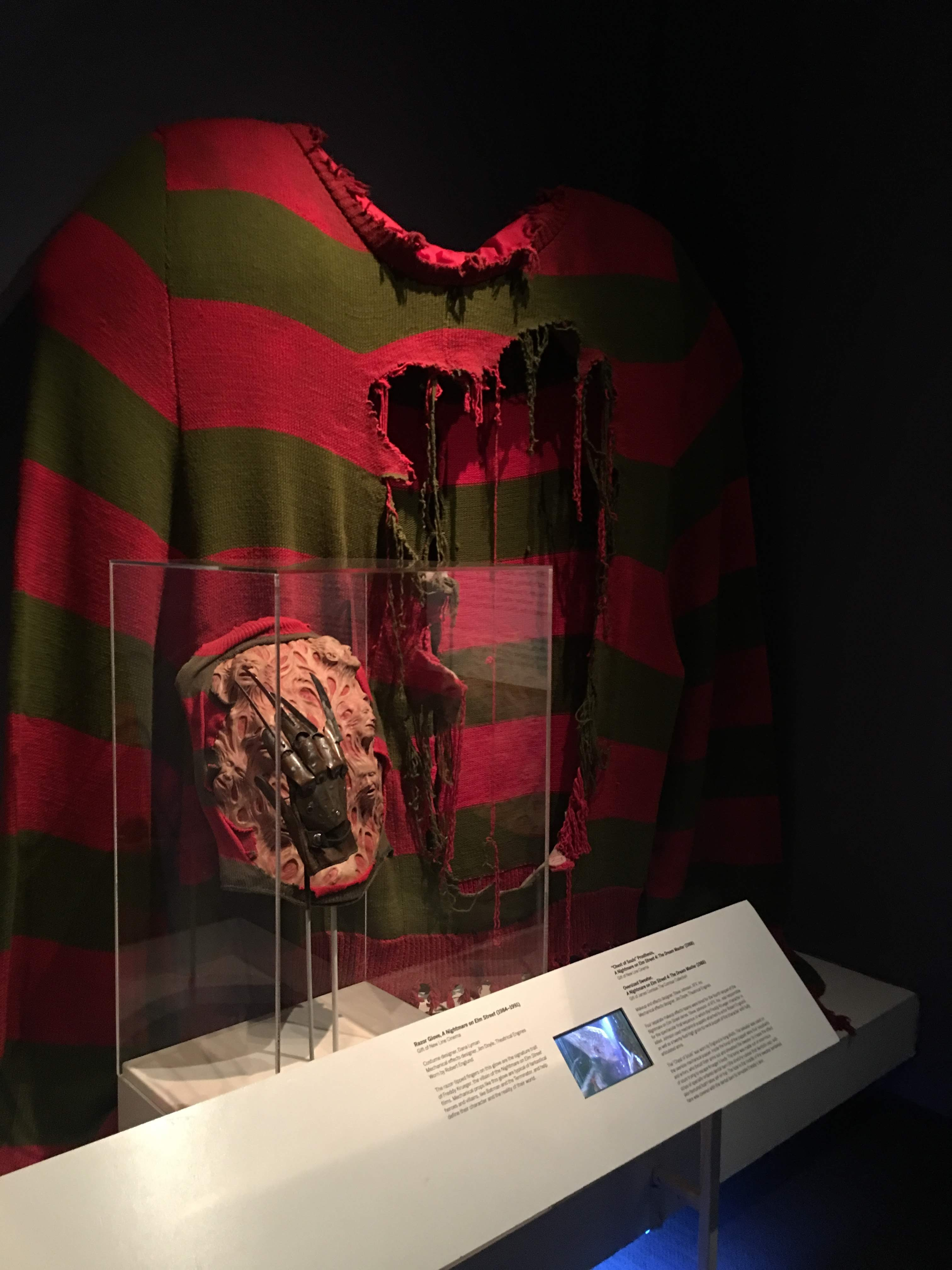
Exhibit in the museum

The Museum of the Moving Image is focused on art, history, technique and technology of film, television, and digital media. It collects, preserves, and provides access to moving-image related artifacts via multimedia exhibitions and educational programming. The exhibits include significant audiovisual components designed to promote an understanding of the history of the industry and an understanding of how it has evolved.

Panel discussions about current movies are frequently held at the museum. The museum hosts regular monthly series in its two premium theaters. These ongoing series include "World of Animation", "The Originals", "Song & Dance", "New York Stories", "Practical Magic," and "Disreputable Cinema". Each of these explore and celebrate many aspects of the art and culture of cinema. It is also home to one of the most significant collections of video games and gaming hardware. The museum's attendance has grown from 60,000 in 2000 to about 300,000 in 2026.

In 2017, the museum opened "the Jim Henson Exhibition", a permanent exhibit honoring the life and ingenuity of Jim Henson and his creations. Further, an exhibit entitled "Envisioning 2001: Stanley Kubrick's Space Odyssey" opened in January 2020.

== History ==
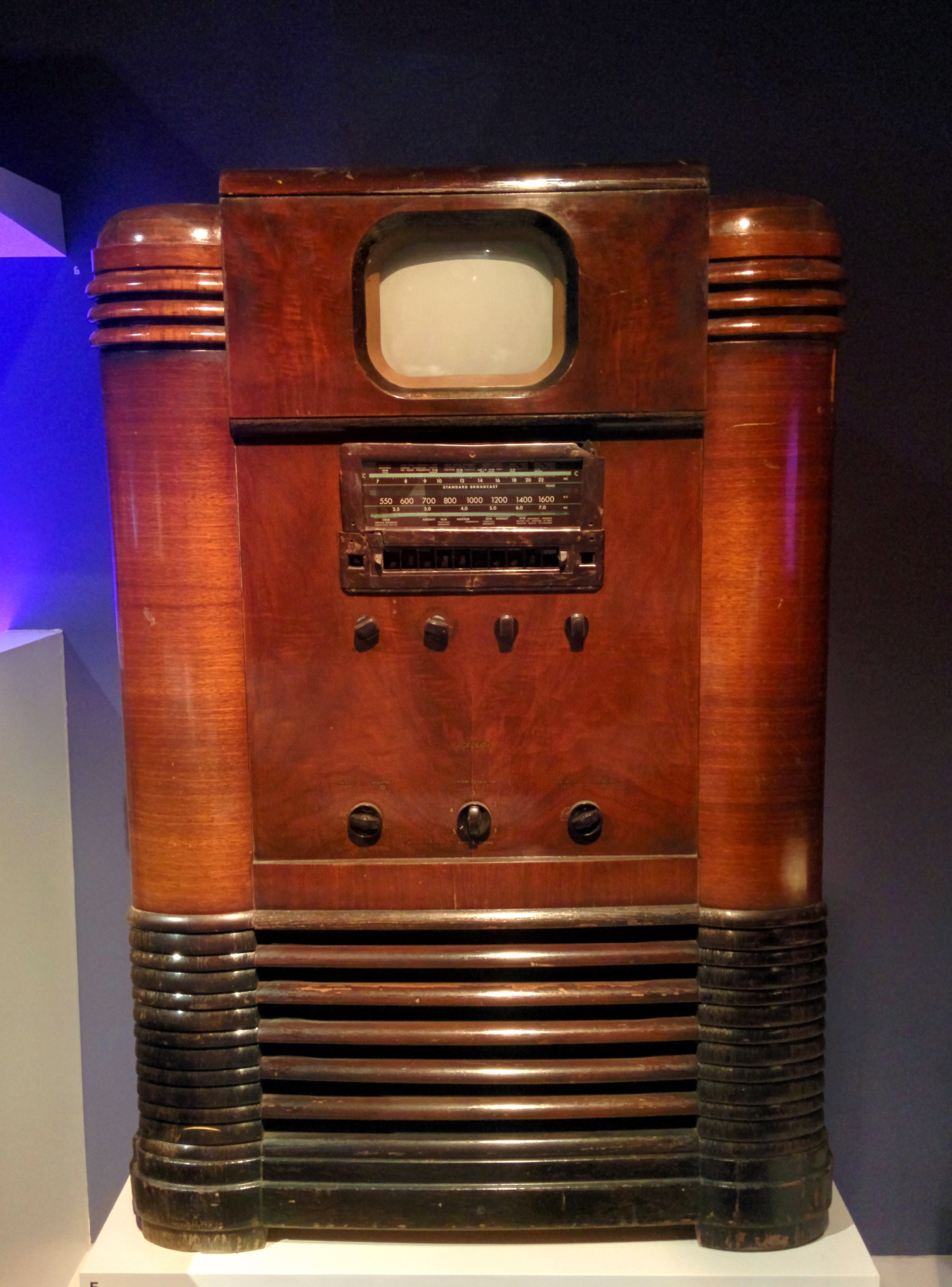
RCA TRK-9 television circa 1939

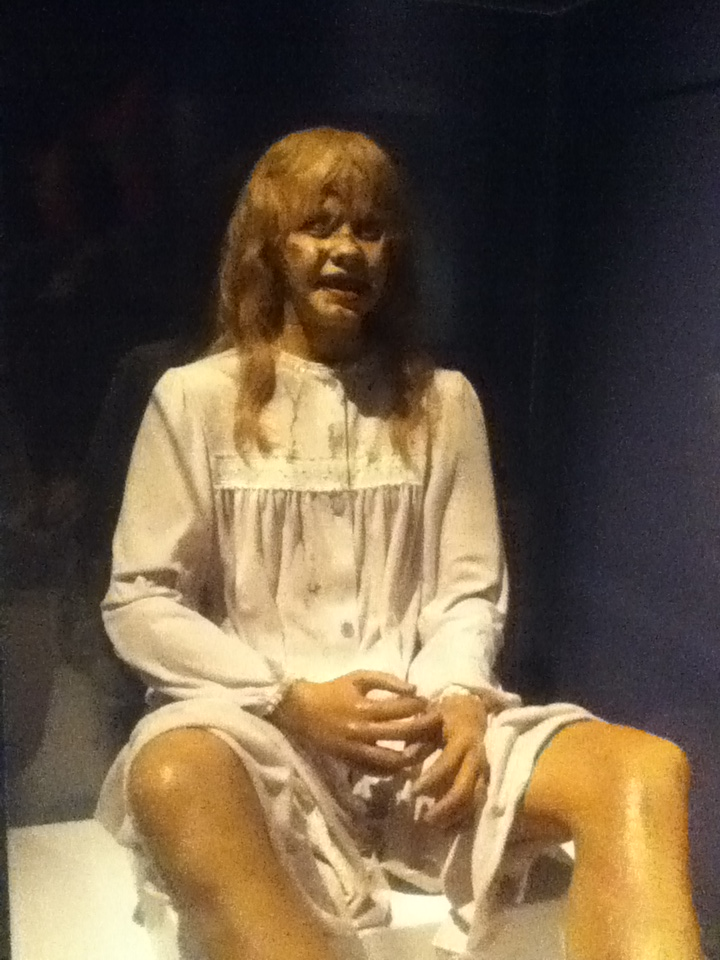
The puppet used in the film The Exorcist (1973)

In 1970, the Astoria Motion Picture and Television Center Foundation took control of the former Astoria Studios in an effort to preserve the now-landmarked building, which was home to a number of significant productions. The foundation's work revitalized the site and consumers' interest in the industry, and plans were made to expand the consumer access to the studio in the form of a museum.

Following seven years of work, and at a cost of $15 million, the American Museum of the Moving Image opened on September 10, 1988, in the former East Coast home of Paramount Pictures as the first museum in the United States that was devoted solely to the art, history and technology of film, television and video. This was followed, days later, by the opening of the British museum of the same name. The New York theater, ultramodern by 1988 standards, was equipped to present 70 mm, 35 mm, and 16 mm film formats and was one of only two sites in New York with the ability to present old nitrate prints. It also re-created moments from television and video history and allowed visitors the opportunity to watch television in a TV lounge from the early days of television.

In 2005, the museum was among 406 New York City arts and social service institutions to receive part of a $20 million grant from the Carnegie Corporation, which was made possible through a donation by New York City mayor Michael Bloomberg.

In March 2008, the museum broke ground for a $65 million expansion that doubled the museum's size and added a new theater and educational space. While the museum remained open during most of the construction period, with its old theater demolished and the new ones yet to be built, screenings series and other events were held off site, although the collection was still available to scholars. The museum opened its redesigned and expanded building, designed by Leeser Architecture, on January 15, 2011. The museum's permanent exhibition, "Behind the Screen", was also redesigned by AC Höcek Architecture LLC at this time.

Beginning in 2011, the museum began hosting the First Look Film Festival, which has since gained acclaim for hosting innovative new international cinema and introducing New York audiences to formally inventive works that seek to redefine the art form of cinema while engaging in a wide range of subjects and styles. The festival is programed by the museum's curator of film, Eric Hynes.

In July 2024, the museum held "100 Years of Parajanov" programming, supported by Armenian Film Society.

== Publication ==
The Museum of the Moving Image has an affiliated magazine, Reverse Shot. The publication, formed in 2003 by independent editors Michael Koresky and Jeff Reichert, offers reviews, interviews, and symposiums on film and time-based media. Koresky and Reichert later partnered with the museum in 2014.

== Community engagement ==
The combination of the COVID-19 pandemic budget cuts and the 2023 Hollywood labor strikes affected the museum’s donor base. With the hiring of the new director, Aziz Isham, in 2023, the museum set forth to revitalize their programming in order to boost community engagement, combat low visitor numbers, and become a staple within the Astoria neighborhood.

Some fixes proposed by Isham resolved issues relating to the museum’s infrastructure, like the modernization of their movie theaters' sound system. They also launched their Open Worlds series, which are free events hosted within their lobby and patio areas. Various events include small business pop-ups, puppet shows, and interactive workshops.

The museum also regularly screens films as well as hosts lectures, performances, and game nights.

== See also ==
- List of museums and cultural institutions in New York City
