= Thomas Leeser =

American architect (born 1952)

- Born: December 12, 1952 (age 73); Frankfurt, West Germany
- Occupation: Architect

Thomas Leeser (born December 12, 1952) is an American architect. He studied at the Technische Hochschule Darmstadt in West Germany where he also got his master's degree in Architecture. He opened his own practice, Leeser Architecture in Brooklyn, New York, in 1989.

Thomas Leeser has been teaching architecture at nine different universities (Columbia University, Cornell University, Harvard University, Pratt Institute, Illinois Institute of Technology, Rensselaer Polytechnic Institute, Parsons School of Design, The Cooper Union, and Princeton University).

His trademark style insists on the design innovation and the integration of new technologies into physical spaces - specially in museums, theaters, educational and broadcast facilities, but also in commercial buildings or even entire city blocks. Some of Leeser's most iconic works are Museum of the Moving Image (New York City).

== Notable projects ==
- Museum of the Moving Image, Queens, New York
- EmQuartier, Bangkok
- BRIC House, Brooklyn, New York
- Mercedes House, New York
- 60 Water Street, Dumbo, Brooklyn, New York
