= Benchasiri Park =

Park in Bangkok, Thailand

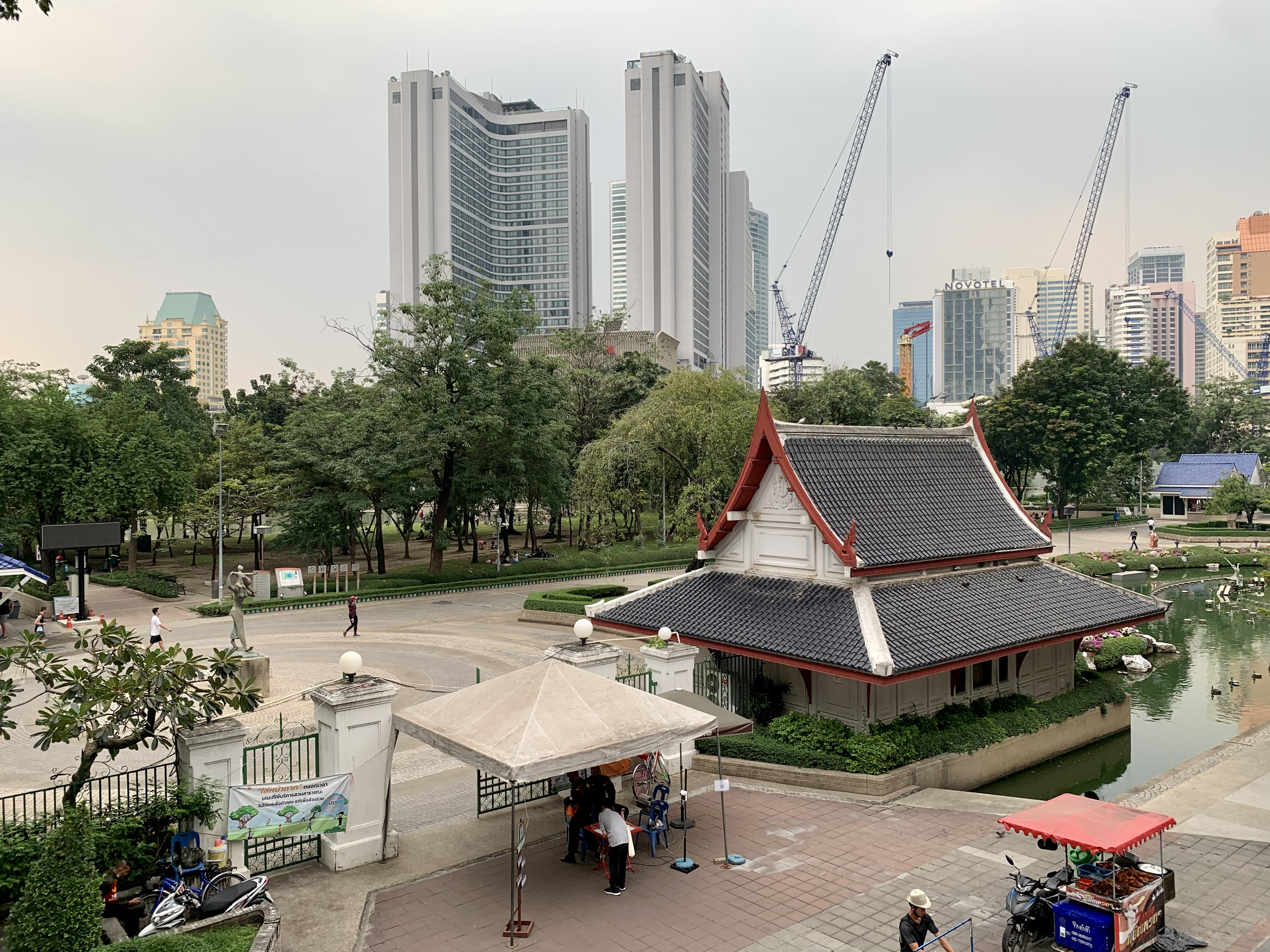
- Benchasiri Park in December 2020 with Bangkok Marriott Marquis Queen's Park in the vicinity
- Interactive map of Benchasiri Park
- Type: Urban Park
- Location: Sukhumvit Road (between Soi 22 and 24), Khlong Toei, Bangkok, Thailand
- Coordinates: 13°43′49.22″N 100°34′2.35″E
- Area: 11.6 acres (4.7 ha)
- Created: 12 August 1992
- Operator: Bangkok Metropolitan Administration
- Status: Open from 5.00 a.m. to 22.00 p.m.
- Public transit: Phrom Phong station BMTA Bus / Affiliated Bus; Taxi / Motorcycle taxi

Benchasiri Park (Thai: สวนเบญจสิริ, RTGS: Suan Benchasiri, pronounced [sǔa̯n bēn.t͡ɕàʔ.sìʔ.rìʔ]; "Park Commemorating the Fifth Cycle Birthday Anniversary") is a garden located on Sukhumvit Road, Khlong Toei District, Bangkok, Thailand.

Built on 11.6 acres (47,000 m^{2}) next door to the Emporium and Emsphere shopping complex, it serves to commemorate the fifth cycle (sixtieth) birthday anniversary of Queen Sirikit on 12 August 1992. Construction began in 1990 on land which originally housed the Bangkok Meteorological Department until its relocation to Bang Na. Built around an ornamental lake, it contains 12 pieces of contemporary sculpture by Thai artists and is often used for open-air events.

It can be reached from Phrom Phong Station (Sukhumvit Line of the BTS Skytrain), and is located between Soi 22 and 24.

This park also allows reclining, unlike other parks.

== Facilities ==
Sports area

This is large area for people who want to go jogging and it has a multi-purpose outdoor court to support volleyball, basketball and skating. This area is surrounded by trees for shade.

Swimming pool

There is a 12.5 x 25 meter swimming pool. This was created as a result of a survey of park users who wanted a place in the area to bring their children to use.

Playground

The playground attracts many children. It is particularly busy on holidays. This area has a large number of items of play equipment.

== Regular Weekly Events ==
=== Dhamma ni suan ===
There is a Buddhist service Sunday from 07.00 – 09.00, aimed to support people who are uncomfortable attending a temple.

=== Dontri ni suan ===
Dontri ni suan occurs on Saturdays and Sundays, to provide relaxing from work and other stresses. There are many songs in Thai and other music from around the world.
