= The Mall Group =

Thai retail company

The Mall Group เดอะมอลล์กรุ๊ป
- Industry: Retailing
- Founded: 25 June 1981
- Founder: Supachai Umpujh; Nongluck Umpujh
- Headquarters: Bang Kapi, Bangkok, Thailand
- Key people: Supaluck Umpujh, chair Lakana Naviroj, managing director
- Products: Shopping centers, department stores
- Revenue: US$1 billion (2016 est.)
- Owner: Umpujh & Phataraprasit families
- Website: themallgroup.com

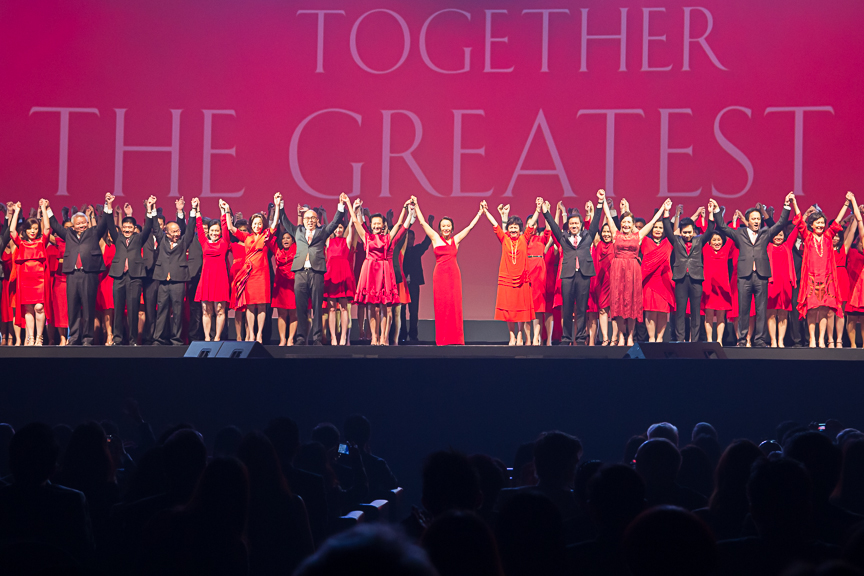
The Mall Group press conference, 2016

The Mall Group (Thai: เดอะมอลล์กรุ๊ป) is one of Thailand’s largest retail conglomerates, known for its portfolio of shopping malls and department stores. It is a private company and a subsidiary of Lukrak Supachai Company Limited. The current chair is Supaluck Umpujh. As of 2018 it had 13,000 employees. The group has been a member of the International Association of Department Stores since 2009.

The company owns The Mall, The Mall Lifestore, Emporium, EmQuartier, Emsphere and Siam Paragon shopping centers. The company also operate Gourmet Market supermarket in those shopping centers as well as those in Terminal 21 Asok, The Promenade [part of Fashion Island (Bangkok)], Lat Phrao MRT station, Design Village Phutthamonthon Sai 3, Design Village Bangna and The Crystal SB Ratchaphruek.

== History ==
The Mall Group opened its first retail store on 25 June 1981 on Ratchadamri Road near Ratchaprasong region in Bangkok. At the time it had 400 employees.

In 2020, the group decided to rebrand for the first time in 39 years, aiming to turn all shopping and retail entertainment complexes to "The Mall Lifestores". According to Chairwoman Supaluck Umpujh, all existing malls should be rebranded by 2023.

In December 2021, the company announced it was teaming up with Bitkub, a cryptocurrency exchange based in Thailand, to form a joint venture aiming to make Thailand a leading hub for digital asset investment.

The company is 65% owned by the Umpujh family and 35% owned by the Phataraprasit family.

As of 2022, The Mall Group owns and manages an estimated 3,000,000 square meters of retail space and generates around $1.2 billion in annual revenue.

== Malls ==
List of The Mall Group's malls
Mall	Opening year	Note
The Mall Ratchadamri (The Mall 1)	1981	The Mall Group's first mall, closed in 1988.
The Mall Ramkamhaeng (The Mall 2, 3 and 4)	1983	Located on Ramkhamhaeng Road, will be served by Ramkhamhaeng 12 MRT station of MRT Orange Line. "The Mall 2" was closed in 2018. "The Mall 4" was closed in 2017. "The Mall 3" Rebranded as 1981 Soul Sold.
The Mall Thapra (The Mall 5)	1989	Located on Ratchadapisek Road, served by Talat Phlu BTS station of Silom Line. Rebranded as The Mall Lifestore Thapra
The Mall Ngamwongwan (The Mall 6)	1991	Located on Ngamwongwan Road, will be served by Ngam Wong Wan 18 (Chulakasem) MRT station of MRT Brown Line. Rebranded as The Mall Lifestore Ngamwongwan.
The Mall Bangkae (The Mall 7)	1994	Located on the intersection where Phet Kasem Road and Kanchanaphisek Road meet, served by Lak Song MRT station of MRT Blue Line. Rebranded as The Mall Lifestore Bangkae.
The Mall Bangkapi (The Mall 8)	1994	Located on Lat Phrao Road, served by Bang Kapi MRT station of MRT Yellow Line. Rebranded as The Mall Lifestore Bangkapi.
Emporium	1997	The Mall Group's first mall to not include "The Mall" in its name. First mall in The Em District, area surrounding Phrom Phong BTS station of Sukhumvit Line.
The Mall Korat (The Mall 9)	2000	The Mall Group's first mall outside Bangkok Metropolitan Region.
Siam Paragon	2005	located in Siam area, directly next to Siam BTS station, an interchange station of Silom and Sukhumvit Lines. It is a joint venture between The Mall Group and Siam Piwat. It is A mass shooting occurred here in 2023.
The Mall SkyPORT	2005	Located inside Terminal 1 of Don Mueang International Airport
BLÚPORT	2014	Located in Hua Hin. It was sold to Proud Real Estate Group in 2021.
EmQuartier	2015	Second mall in The Em District.
EmSphere	2023	Third mall in The Em District.
Bangkok Mall	2030	Currently under construction, will include Bangkok Arena, will be the biggest shopping mall in Southeast Asia by Gross Leasable Area once open.

== See also ==
- List of shopping malls in Thailand
