= Vincent Calvino =

- First appearance: Spirit House
- Last appearance: Dance Me to the End of Time
- Created by: Christopher G. Moore

In-universe information
- Gender: Male
- Occupation: Private detective
- Nationality: American

Vincent Calvino is a fictional Bangkok-based private eye created by Christopher G. Moore in the Vincent Calvino Private Eye series. Vincent Calvino first appeared in 1992 in Spirit House, the first novel in the series. His latest appearance is in Jumpers, the 16th novel in the series published in October 2016. "Hewn from the hard-boiled Dashiell Hammett/Raymond Chandler model, Calvino is a tough, somewhat tarnished hero with a heart of gold."

His final appearance is in Dance Me to the End of Time, the 17th novel in the series published in January 2020. " Christopher Moore transforms his classic noir sensibility with a thrilling warp drive vision of our tomorrow with the timelessness of today. What a great creative work of fiction."."

== Background ==
Moore's protagonist, Vincent Calvino, half-Jewish and half-Italian, is an ex-lawyer from New York, who, under ambiguous circumstances, gave up law practice and became a private eye in Bangkok. Calvino has often been likened to classic hardboiled detective characters like Raymond Chandler's Philip Marlowe, Dashiell Hammett's Sam Spade, and Mickey Spillane's Mike Hammer. "The hard-bitten worldview and the cynical, bruised idealism of his battered hero [Vincent Calvino] is right out of Chandler," wrote Kevin Burton Smith in January Magazine. The Daily Yomiuri called Calvino "a thinking man's Philip Marlowe ... a cynic on the surface but a romantic at heart." The Nation calls Calvino "a worthy successor of Raymond Chandler's Philip Marlowe and Mickey Spillane's Mike Hammer." Some critics see Moore's work a little differently however. Douglas Fetherling said "Moore is a genuine novelist who just happens to employ the conventions of the thriller genre, that his real interests are believable human behavior and way cultures cross-pollinate and sometimes crash. [His work] is real prose, not Raymond Chandler stuff, and his motives are as close to art as they are to entertainment."

== Vincent Calvino Private Eye Series ==
Moore's Vincent Calvino Private Eye series is a hardboiled crime fiction in the Western tradition reinvented in an exotic but realistic Southeast Asia. The series is among the first English-language crime fiction that introduces the element of Noir Fiction into the world of Southeast Asian crime fiction. The Vincent Calvino mysteries are dark and realistic, interwoven with contemporary local and international affairs.

"Moore's work recalls the international 'entertainments' of Graham Greene or John le Carré ... intelligent and articulate, Moore offers a rich, passionate and original take on the private eye game, fans of the genre should definitely investigate, and fans of foreign intrigue will definitely appreciate," (Kevin Burton Smith, January Magazine).

The Thrilling Detective has said of the Calvino series: "A big part of Moore's charm is his unerring eye for the intricacies of not just the Thai culture but also the Thai psyche, and the curious demimonde of the expat community, caught forever in the tug-of-war between East and West .... [H]e captures the sights and sounds and the lights of Bangkok's nightlife particularly well."

Novels from the Vincent Calvino series have been translated or are in the process of being translated into a number of languages, including German, French, Italian, Hebrew, Japanese, Chinese, Spanish, Turkish, Norwegian and Thai.

The third novel in the Vincent Calvino series Zero Hour in Phnom Pehn (originally, Cut Out) won third place in the 2004 "German Critics Award for Crime Fiction" (Deutscher Krimi Preis) in the international crime fiction category. Asia Hand, the second Calvino novel, won the Shamus Award sponsored by the Private Eyes of America in 2011 in the Best Paperback Original category.

Chad A. Evans' Vincent Calvino's World, A Noir Guide to Southeast Asia explores the historical and cultural context of the 15 Calvino novels written over 25 years.

== Novels in the Vincent Calvino series ==
- Spirit House (1992) ISBN 974-8495-58-2
- Asia Hand (1993) ISBN 974-8495-70-1
- Zero Hour in Phnom Penh (original title: Cut Out) (1994) ISBN 974-87116-3-3
- Comfort Zone (1995) ISBN 974-87754-9-6
- The Big Weird (1996) ISBN 974-89677-3-5
- Cold Hit (1999) ISBN 974-92104-1-7
- Minor Wife (2002) ISBN 974-92126-5-7
- Pattaya 24/7 (2004) ISBN 974-92066-6-5
- The Risk of Infidelity Index (2007) ISBN 978-974-88168-7-6
- Paying Back Jack (2009) ISBN 978-974-312-920-9
- The Corruptionist (2010) ISBN 978-616-90393-3-4
- 9 Gold Bullets (2011) ISBN 978-616-90393-7-2
- Missing In Rangoon (2013) ISBN 978-616-7503-17-2
- The Marriage Tree (2014) ISBN 978-616-7503-23-3
- Crackdown (2015) ISBN 978-616-7503-32-5.
- Jumpers (2016) ISBN 978-616-7503-34-9.
- Dance Me to the End of Time (2020) ISBN 978-616-7503-39-4.

== See also ==
- Crime fiction
- List of detective fiction authors
- List of mystery writers
- List of crime writers
- List of Canadian writers
- List of novelists by nationality
