= Christopher G. Moore =

Canadian writer

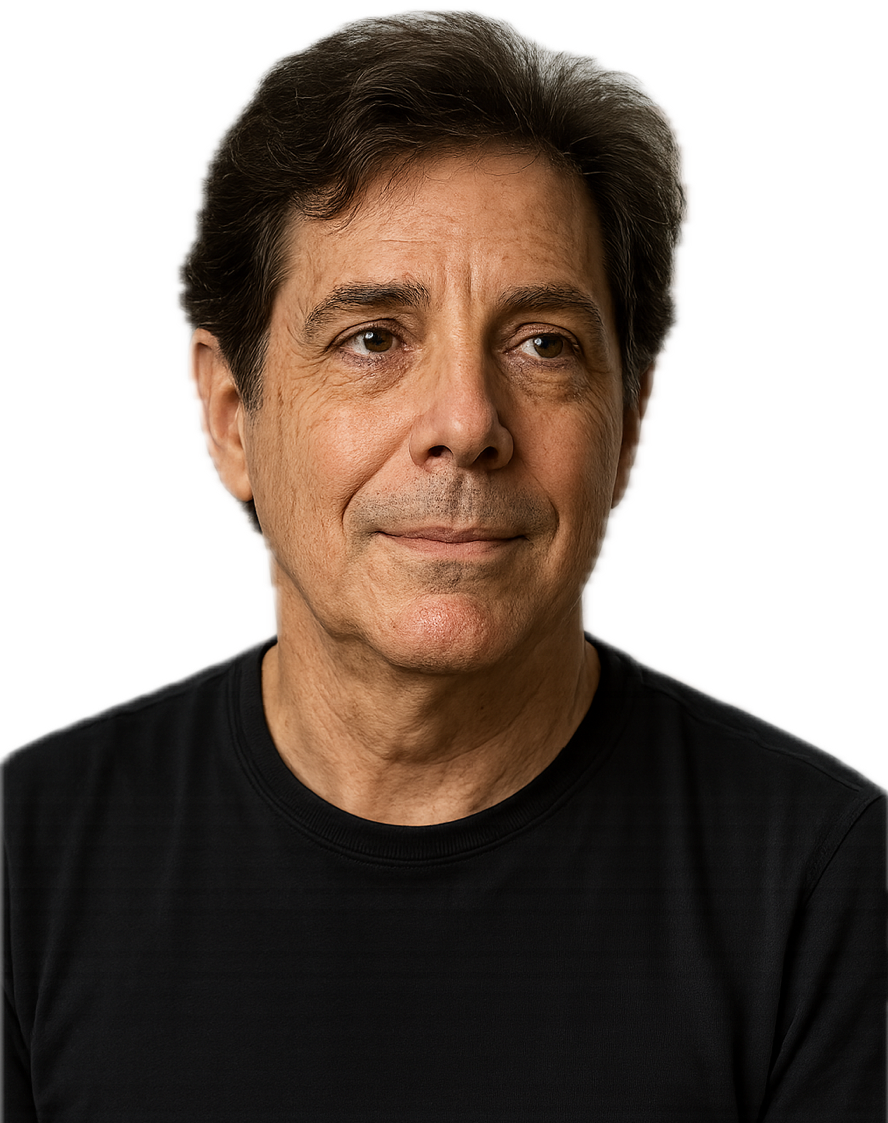
- Moore in 2025
- Education: Oxford University
- Occupations: Novelist; non-fiction writer
- Writing career
- Genre: Crime fiction
- Website: www.christophergmoore.com

Christopher G. Moore is a Canadian writer living in Thailand, best known for his Land of Smiles Trilogy and his Vincent Calvino Private Eye series. Moore is the author of more than thirty novels, six works of non-fiction, four radio dramas, and editor of three anthologies.

Moore moved to Thailand in 1988, settling in Bangkok. He has lived there for nearly four decades, and is well-known amongst its English-speaking expatriate community. His books have been translated into over a dozen languages, and are particularly popular in Thailand and Germany.

== Early life and education ==
Christopher G. Moore is from Vancouver, British Columbia, and spent his early years living in Vancouver and Toronto. He studied law at Oxford University, following which he joined the University of British Columbia (UBC) as a professor. His earliest writing consisted of radio plays, such as View from the Cambie Bridge, on the subject of internment of Japanese Canadians during the Second World War. He travelled to Japan in 1983, and continuing at the invitation of a friend, arrived in Thailand for the first time. From 1985 until 1988, Moore lived in New York City, where his debut novel His Lordship's Arsenal was published. He returned to Thailand in 1988, settling in Bangkok. He is fluent in the Thai language.

== Writing career in Thailand ==
External videos
- "The Big Weird World of Christopher G. Moore" – Heaven Lake Press (27:00 min)

Described as "Thailand's finest expatriate crime-fiction novelist", Moore has lived in Bangkok for nearly four decades. The Vincent Calvino Private Eye series, which began with Spirit House in 1992, is among his most popular works. The Vincent Calvino novels are bestsellers in Germany, and the series was optioned for television. His Land of Smiles Trilogy, comprising A Killing Smile (1991), A Bewitching Smile (1992), and A Haunting Smile (1993), are considered cult classics.

Despite his international acclaim, Moore's novels were not published in Canada until the early 2000s, starting with a 2003 reprint of His Lordship's Arsenal and a 2004 reprint of Waiting for the Lady by Subway Books. George Fetherling, the owner of Subway Books, discovered Moore's novels through his website and began a correspondence with him, eventually offering to bring his books to Canada. This followed Moore turning down several offers from New York-based publishers, which he said "weren't the right ones". Moore gave his first public reading in Vancouver in 2003 at the Vancouver International Writers Festival.

Also a prolific non-fiction writer, Moore has produced a substantial volume of essays on cultural and political topics such as privacy and social justice; at one point, he wrote an essay every week for over five years. His first collection of essays, The Cultural Detective, was published in 2011. The book was soon followed by Faking It in Bangkok (2012), Fear and Loathing in Bangkok (2014), and The Age of Dis-Consent: Essays (2015).

Moore's work has been translated into over a dozen languages including Japanese, German, Thai, Chinese, Hebrew, Turkish, and Russian. His fiction and essays have appeared in the Evergreen Review, The Brooklyn Rail, the Mekong Review, the Bangkok Post, and The Phnom Penh Post, among others. His novels are especially popular in Thailand, where he is well-known among the English-speaking expatriate community.

=== Vincent Calvino series ===
Vincent Calvino is a fictional Bangkok-based private eye created by Moore in the Vincent Calvino Private Eye series. Vincent Calvino first appeared in 1992 in Spirit House, the first novel in the series. Spirit House was included on The top 100 Kindle books of all time. District #3, the 18th novel, was published in November 2024. Moore's protagonist, Vincent Calvino, half-Jewish and half-Italian, is an ex-lawyer from New York, who, under ambiguous circumstances, gave up law practice and became a private eye in Bangkok. "Hewn from the hard-boiled Dashiell Hammett/Raymond Chandler model, Calvino is a tough, somewhat tarnished hero with a heart of gold."—Mark Schreiber, The Japan Times

Chad A. Evans, a Canadian literary critic living in Australia, published a study of Moore's work in 2015 entitled Vincent Calvino's World, A Noir Guide to Southeast Asia. The book explores the historical, social, and cultural context of the 15 Calvino novels written over 25 years.

== Style and themes ==
Moore's writing is characterized by a hard-boiled noir style reminiscent of Raymond Chandler and Ross Macdonald, and he is praised for his "rich, passionate and original take on the private eye game". His novels are written in third-person, and he employs allegory and symbolism to layer his narratives. He has been described as "Dashiell Hammett in Bangkok", "Hemingway in Bangkok", and "W. Somerset Maugham with a bit of Elmore Leonard and Mickey Spillane thrown in for good measure." His works blend genre conventions of crime fiction with literary depth, alternating between entertaining thrillers and more introspective narratives, drawing comparisons to Graham Greene.

According to the Canadian literary critic Douglas Fetherling, "it shows at once that Moore is a genuine novelist who just happens to employ the conventions of the thriller genre, that his real interests are believable human behaviour and way cultures cross-pollinate and sometimes clash." Reviewers have highlighted Moore's knowledge of Southeast Asian history and focus on East-West encounters, portraying them as studies in cultural insight laced with humour and realism. His work addresses the complexities of expatriate perspectives in Southeast Asia, exploring social contradictions, local customs, and the undercurrents of power and corruption in Thai society.

== Philanthropy ==
Moore is the founder of the Christopher G. Moore Foundation, a charitable organization based in London, England. The foundation was established in 2015 to recognize the values of human rights and literary excellence in non-fiction. It confers the Moore Prize, an annual literary award recognizing books that advance awareness of human rights.

He is also the founder of Changing Climate, Changing Lives (CCCL) Film Festival, established in November 2019. The annual film festival features short films by young Thai film makers showcasing ways of using local wisdom and experience to adapt to climate change in Thailand.

== Works ==
=== Novels ===
- His Lordship's Arsenal (1985). Freundlich Books. ISBN 0-8819-1033-3; Critics Choice (1988); Heaven Lake Press (1999); Subway Books (2003).
- Enemies of Memory (1990). White Lotus. ISBN 9-7484-9544-2; reprinted as Tokyo Joe, Heaven Lake Press (2004) ISBN 9-7492-2817-0.
- A Killing Smile (1991). White Lotus. ISBN 9-7484-9548-5, second printing (1992), third and fourth printing BookSiam (1996); fifth and sixth printing Heaven Lake Press (2000); seventh printing (2004); Heaven Lake Press revised edition (2025) ISBN 978-6-1675-0343-1.
- A Bewitching Smile (1992). White Lotus. ISBN 9-7484-9557-4; Heaven Lake Press (2000); Heaven Lake Press revised edition (2025) ISBN 978-6-1675-0346-2.
- Spirit House (1992). White Lotus. ISBN 9-7484-9558-2. Heaven Lake Press (1999) ISBN 9-7484-9558-2, reprinted (2004), Grove Press (2008).
- Asia Hand (1993). White Lotus. ISBN 9-7484-9570-1. Heaven Lake Press (2000), Black Cat (2010).
- A Haunting Smile (1993). White Lotus. ISBN 9-7484-9582-5, Heaven Lake Press (1999) reprinted (2004; Heaven Lake Press revised edition (2025) ISBN 978-6-1675-0349-3.
- Cut Out (1994). White Lotus. ISBN 9-7487-1163-3, Matichon, (1996), Heaven Lake Press (1999). Re-released under the title Zero Hour in Phnom Penh – ISBN 9-7493-0359-8.
- Saint Anne (1994). Asia Books. OCLC 62943699; reprinted as Red Sky Falling in 2005.
- Comfort Zone (1995). White Lotus; pocketbook edition (1997) ISBN 9-7487-7549-6; Heaven Lake Press (2001).
- The Big Weird (1996). bookSiam. Heaven Lake Press (2008) ISBN 978-9-7484-1842-1.
- God of Darkness (1998). Asia Books. ISBN 9-7492-2817-0. Heaven Lake Press (1999) reprinted (2004).
- Cold Hit (1999). Heaven Lake Press. ISBN 9-7492-1041-7; reprinted (2004). The German translation is titled Nana Plaza.
- Chairs (2000). Heaven Lake Press. ISBN 9-7487-6919-4.
- Minor Wife (2002). Heaven Lake Press. ISBN 9-7492-1265-7; reprinted (2004).
- Pattaya 24/7 (2004). Heaven Lake Press. ISBN 9-7492-0666-5.
- Waiting for the Lady (2003). Heaven Lake Press. ISBN 9-7492-1861-2; Subway Books (2004), trade paperback edition Heaven Lake Press (2005).
- Red Sky Falling (2005). Heaven Lake Press. ISBN 9-7492-3857-5; reprint of Saint Anne (1994).
- Gambling on Magic (2005). Heaven Lake Press. ISBN 9-7492-9425-4.
- The Risk of Infidelity Index (2008). Atlantic Monthly Press. ISBN 978-9-7488-1687-6. The Polish translation is titled Ulice Bangkoku.
- Paying Back Jack (2009). Heaven Lake Press. ISBN 978-9-7431-2920-9; Grove Press (2009).
- The Corruptionist (2010). Heaven Lake Press. ISBN 978-6-1690-3933-4.
- 9 Gold Bullets (2011). Heaven Lake Press. ISBN 978-6-1690-3937-2.
- The Wisdom of Beer (2012). Heaven Lake Press. ISBN 978-6-1675-0311-0.
- Missing In Rangoon (2013). Heaven Lake Press. ISBN 978-6-1675-0317-2.
- Reunion (2013). Heaven Lake Press. ISBN 978-6-1675-0319-6.
- The Marriage Tree (2014). Heaven Lake Press. ISBN 978-6-1675-0323-3.
- Crackdown (2015). Heaven Lake Press. ISBN 978-6-1675-0332-5.
- Jumpers (2016). Heaven Lake Press. ISBN 978-6-1675-0334-9.
- Dance Me to the End of Time (2020). Heaven Lake Press. ISBN 978-6-1675-0339-4.
- District #3 (2024). Heaven Lake Press. ISBN 978-6-1675-0341-7.
- The Client That Wasn't There (2026). Heaven Lake Press. ISBN 978-6-1675-0352-3 (paperback). ISBN 978-6-1675-0353-0 (ebook).

=== Non-fiction ===
- Heart Talk (1992). White Lotus. 2nd Ed. Heaven Lake Press (1998), 3rd Ed. Heaven Lake Press (2005) ISBN 9-7492-9425-4.
- The Vincent Calvino Reader's Guide (2010). Heaven Lake Press. ISBN 978-6-1690-3934-1.
- The Cultural Detective (2011). Heaven Lake Press. ISBN 978-6-1690-3938-9.
- Faking It in Bangkok (2012). Heaven Lake Press. ISBN 978-6-1675-0313-4.
- Fear and Loathing in Bangkok (2014). Heaven Lake Press. ISBN 978-6-1675-0324-0.
- The Age of Dis-Consent (2015). Heaven Lake Press. ISBN 978-6-1675-0331-8.
- Memory Manifesto: A Walking Meditation through Cambodia (2017). Heaven Lake Press. ISBN 978-6-1675-0335-6.
- Rooms: On Human Domestication and Submission (2019). Heaven Lake Press. ISBN 978-6-1675-0338-7.

=== Anthology ===
- Bangkok Noir (2011; editor). Heaven Lake Press. ISBN 978-6-1675-0304-2.
- Phnom Penh Noir (2012; editor). Heaven Lake Press. ISBN 978-6-1675-0315-8.
- The Orwell Brigade (2012; editor). Heaven Lake Press. ISBN 978-6-1675-0316-5.

=== Radio drama ===
- Sticks and Pucks (1980). CBC, Canada.
- The Semi-Detached Barrister (1981). CBC, Canada.
- The Bamboo Pillar (1983). CBC, Canada.
- View from Cambie Bridge (1983). NHK, Japan.

=== Documentary ===
- The Impatient Artist (2017).

== Recognition ==
- Premier Special Director Book Award, Semana Negra, Spain (2007), for the German edition of Cut Out, titled Zero Hour in Phnom Penh, the third Calvino novel.
- German Critics Award for International Crime Fiction (2008), for Zero Hour in Phnom Penh.
- Shamus Award, Best Paperback Original (2011), for Asia Hand, the second Calvino novel.
- Arthur Ellis Award, Best Novella Finalist (2013), for Reunion.
