= EmSphere =

Shopping mall in Bangkok, Thailand

EMSPHERE

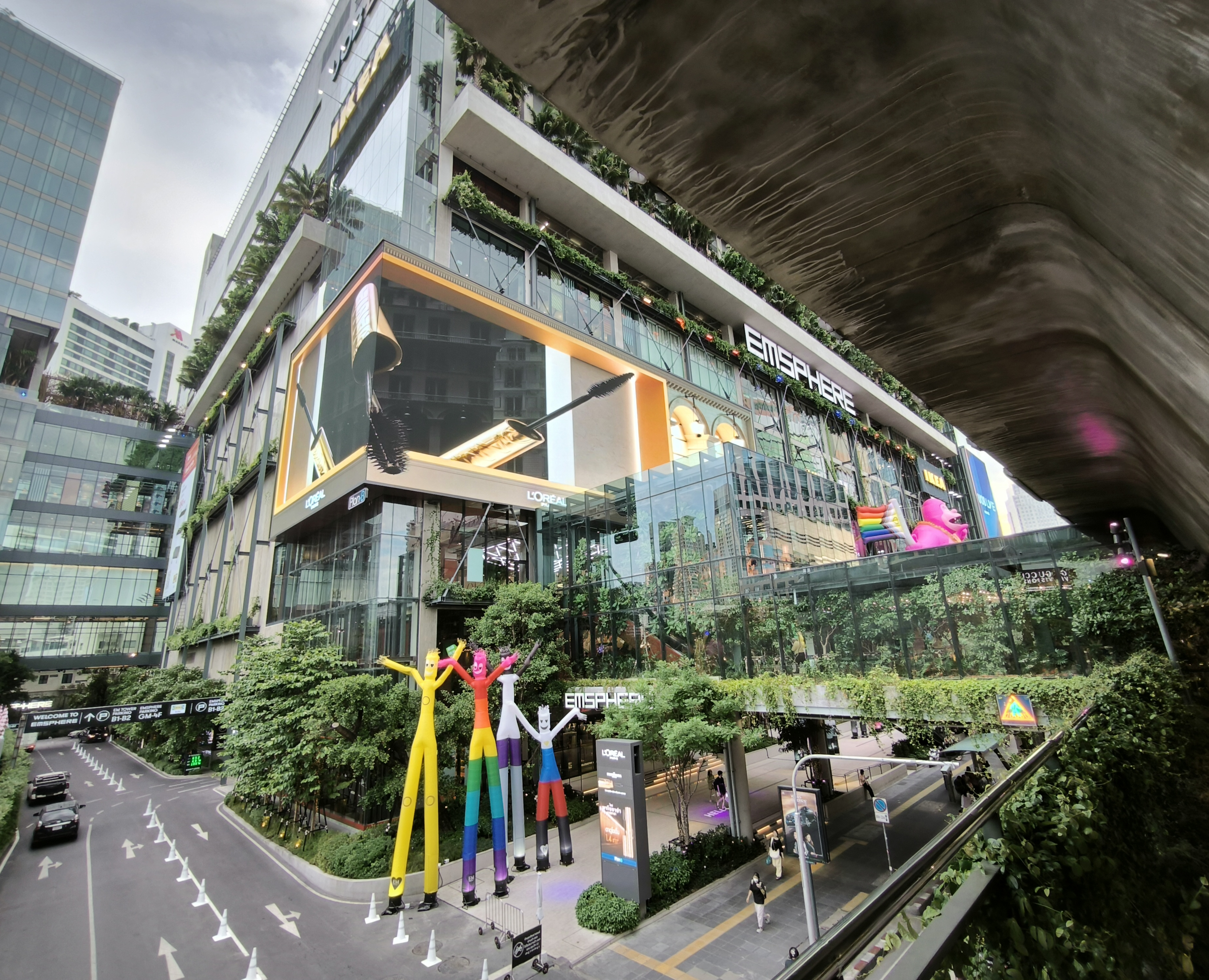
- Emsphere in 2024
- Location: Khlong Toei, Bangkok, Thailand
- Coordinates: 13.73188°N 100.56609°E
- Opened: 1 December 2023
- Developer: The Mall Group
- Manager: The Mall Group
- Owner: The Mall Group
- Floor area: 200,000 m^{2} (2,200,000 sq ft)
- Website: emsphere.co.th

EmSphere is a shopping mall in Bangkok, Thailand. Developed and operated by The Mall Group, it opened on 1 December 2023.

The mall is the third component of the EM District, alongside Emporium and EmQuartier, near Phrom Phong BTS station. Located adjacent to Benchasiri Park, the 200,000 m^{2} (2,200,000 sq ft) development was built at a cost of 15 billion baht.

EmSphere houses IKEA Sukhumvit, the first IKEA city-centre store in Southeast Asia. The mall also contains UOB Live, a live entertainment venue with a capacity of up to 6,000 people. The venue opened on 11 February 2024 with An Evening with Ed Sheeran, a concert by Ed Sheeran.

The site was formerly occupied by an entertainment area known as Washington Square.

== Gallery ==
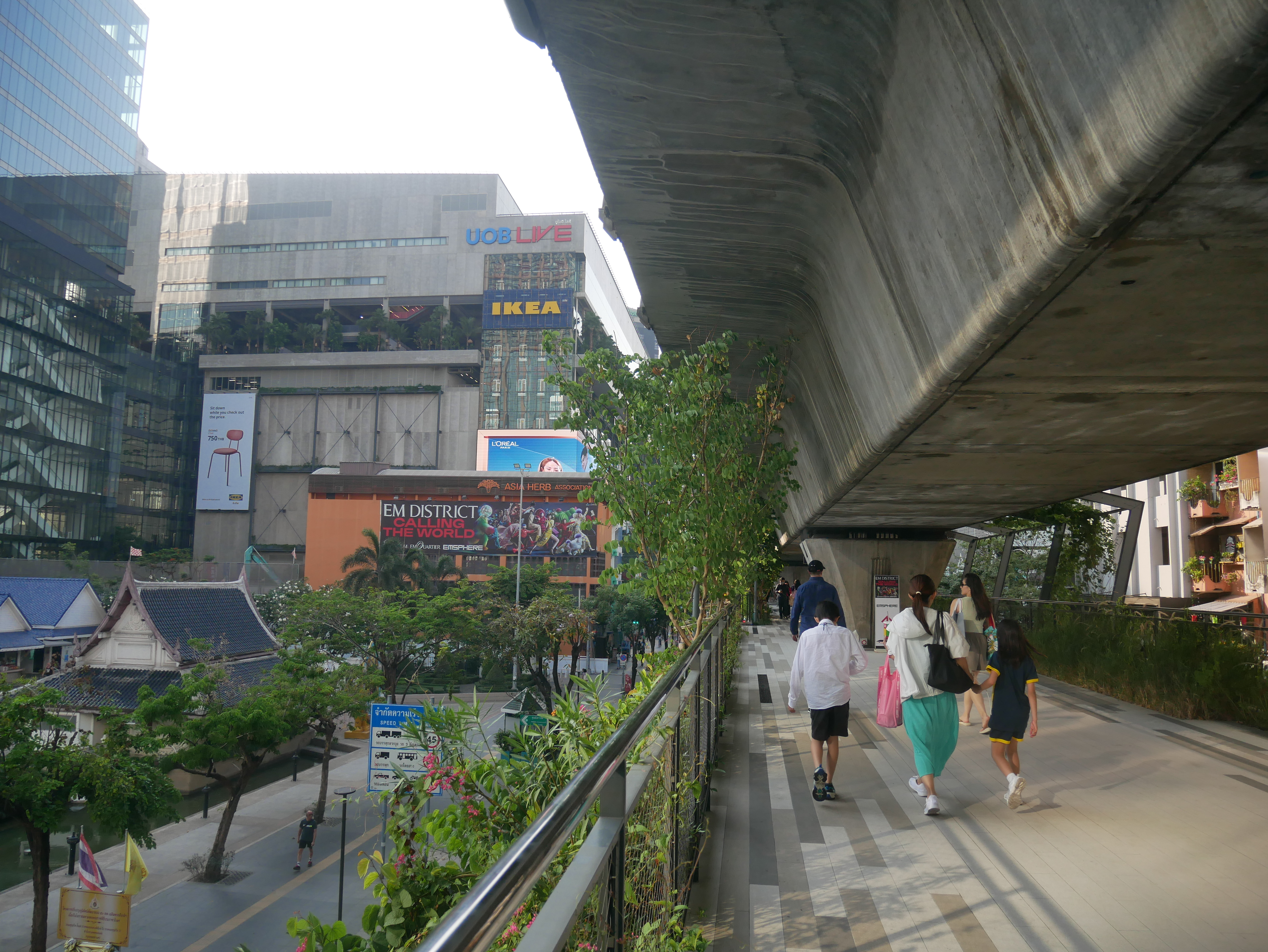
Skywalk linking Phrom Phong BTS station with EmSphere

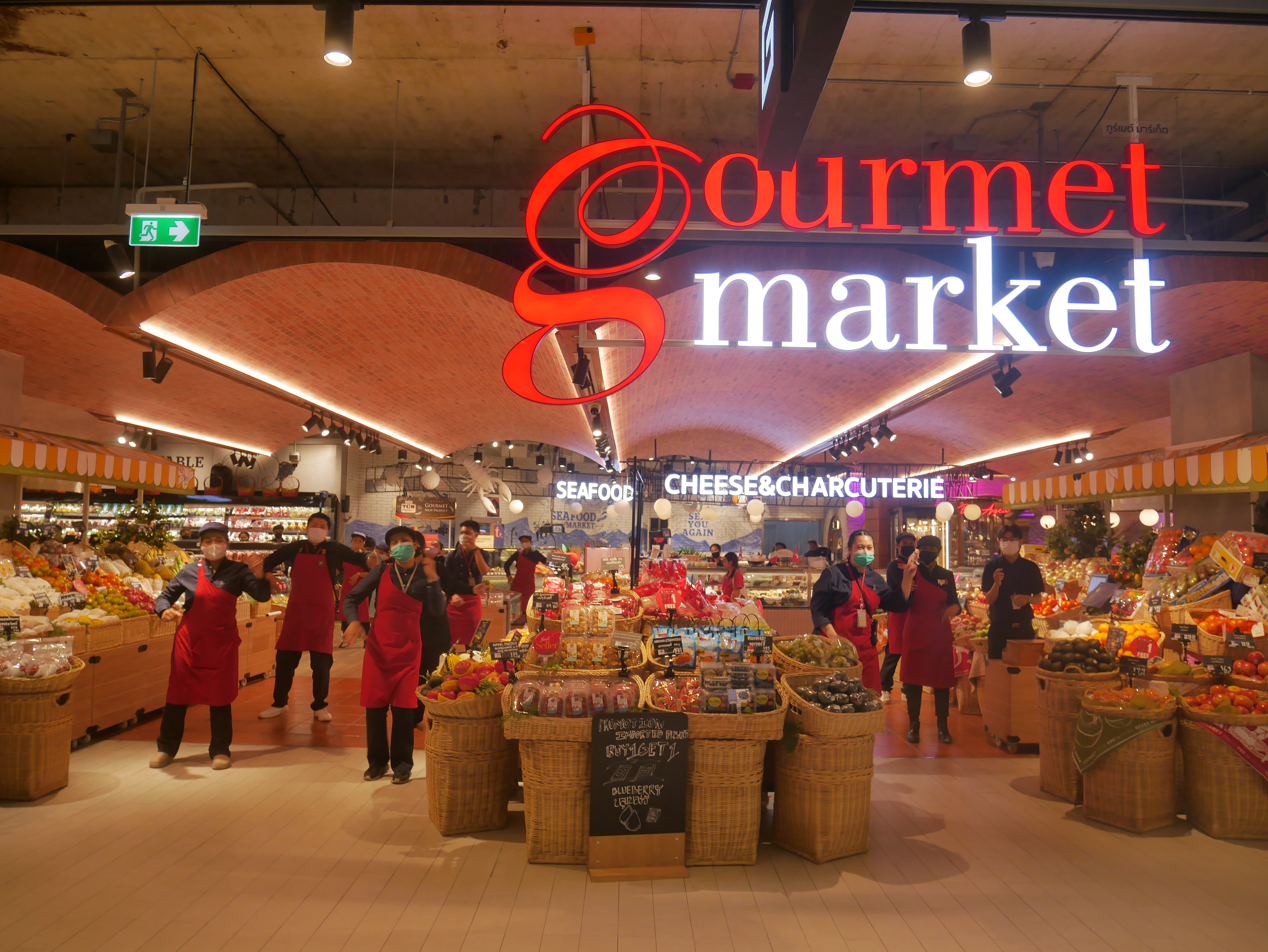
Gourmet Market

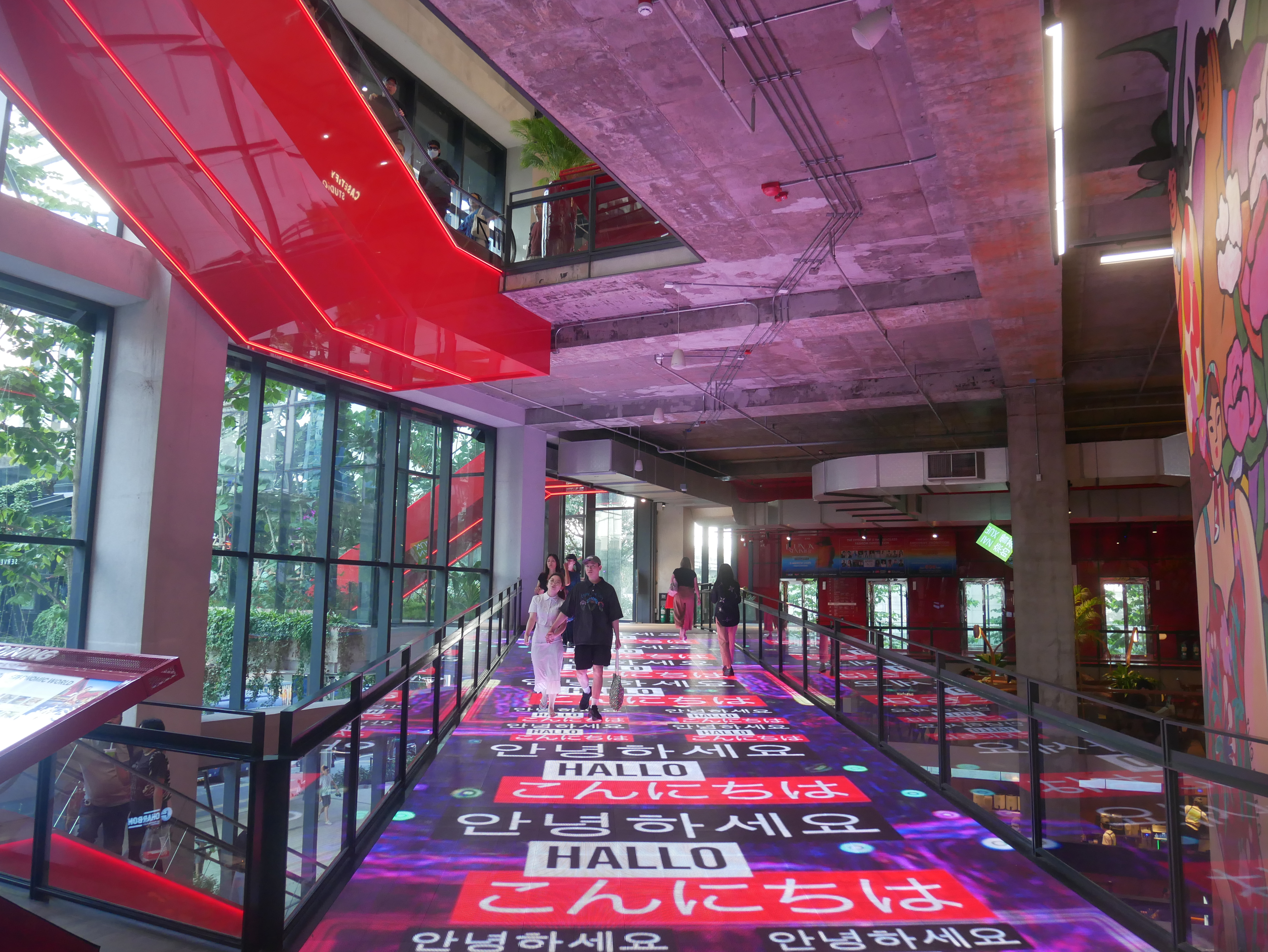
Interior walkway with a digital floor display

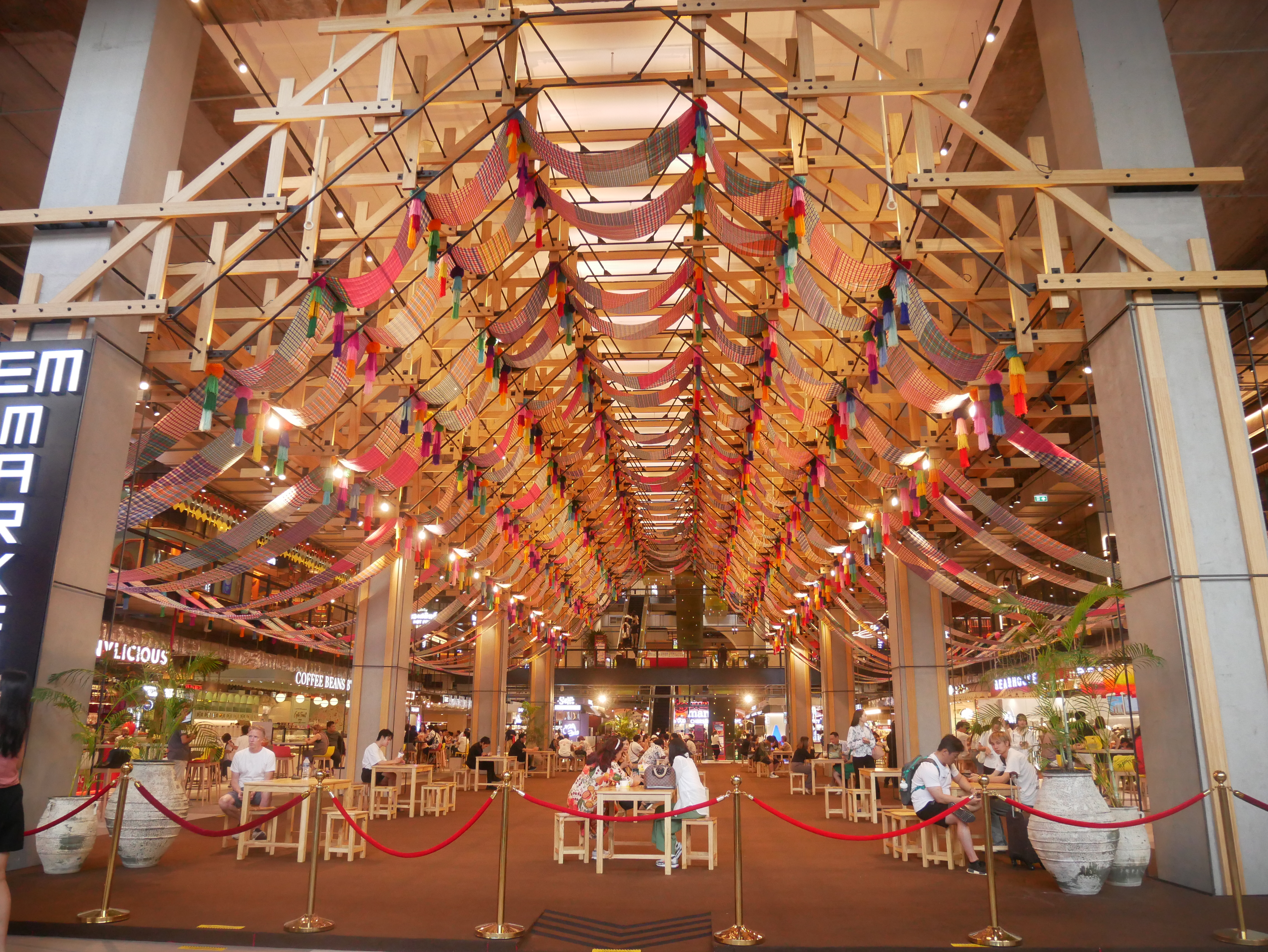
EM Market Hall
