= Phrom Phong BTS station =

Train station in Bangkok, Thailand

Phrom Phong พร้อมพงษ์
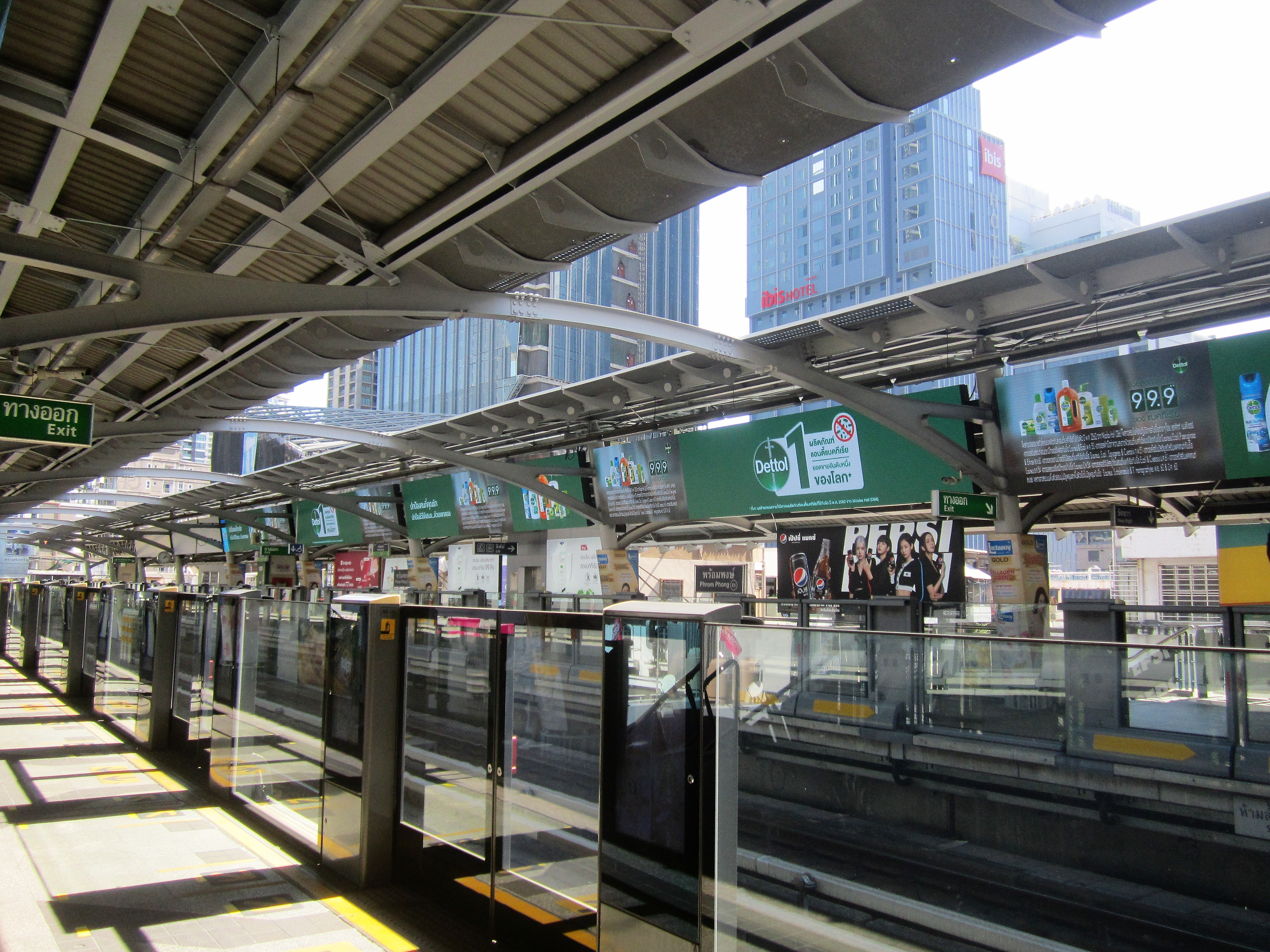
- Phrom Phong station

General information
- Location: Khlong Toei and Watthana; Bangkok; Thailand
- Coordinates: 13°43′49.58″N 100°34′11.03″E
- System: BTS
- Owner: Bangkok Metropolitan Administration (BMA); BTS Rail Mass Transit Growth Infrastructure Fund (BTSGIF)
- Operator: Bangkok Mass Transit System; Public Company Limited (BTSC)
- Line: Sukhumvit Line

Other information
- Station code: E5

History
- Opened: 5 December 1999

Passengers
- 2021: 3,664,227

Services
Preceding station	BTS Skytrain	Following station
Asok towards Khu Khot	Sukhumvit Line	Thong Lo towards Kheha
Location

Phrom Phong Station Traditional sign

Phrom Phong station (Thai: สถานีพร้อมพงษ์, pronounced [sā.tʰǎː.nīː pʰrɔ́ːm pʰōŋ]) is a BTS Skytrain station, on the Sukhumvit Line between Khlong Toei and Watthana Districts, Bangkok, Thailand. The station is on Sukhumvit Road at Soi Phrom Phong (Soi Sukhumvit 39). The area is a popular shopping destination, and the station is linked by skybridge to EmQuartier, Emporium and EmSphere shopping malls with urban green space Benjasiri Park.

== See also ==
- Bangkok Skytrain
